= Tini Tour =

2022–2023 concert tour by Tini

- Tour by Tini
- Promotional poster for the 2022 tour concerts
- Location: South America; Europe; North America
- Associated albums: Tini Tini Tini; Cupido
- Start date: 20 May 2022
- End date: 5 November 2023
- Legs: 7
- No. of shows: 42 in South America; 12 in Europe; 6 in North America; 60 in total
- Attendance: 502,900 (26 shows) (Note: Attendance figures for the Tini Tour 2022 from the first South American and European legs.)

Tini concert chronology
- Quiero Volver Tour (2018–2020); Tini Tour (2022–2023); Futttura World Tour (2025–2027)

The Tini Tour 2022/23 (stylized in all caps) was the third headlining concert tour by Argentine singer Tini, in support of her third and fourth studio albums, Tini Tini Tini (2020) and Cupido (2023), respectively. Consisting of seven legs over the course of 17 months, the tour began on 20 May 2022 in Buenos Aires, Argentina and concluded on 5 November 2023 in Los Angeles, California, United States. It was preceded by several concert festival appearances, the Tini Tini Tini Show, in Argentina, Bolivia and Chile.

The tour was originally set to begin in March 2022, but due to Tini's father's health and hospitalization, the entire tour was postponed until that May. The concerts on 28 May at Hipódromo and 22–23 December 2022, at Campo de Polo, were broadcast live on Star+ (Latin America) and on Disney+ (USA). The initial broadcast was titled TINI Tour 2022: Live from Buenos Aires (Spanish: "TINI Tour 2022: En Vivo desde Buenos Aires"), and the second one as Tini Tour 2022: Farewell of the Year (Spanish: "Tini Tour 2022: La Despedida del Año").

== Background ==
After having two years off, and being forced to cancel much of her Quiero Volver Tour (2018–20) due to the COVID-19 pandemic, Tini was excited to perform once again. On that previously planned tour, she had wanted to present the majority of the tracks from her third album, Tini Tini Tini, but the tour only lasted from 13 December 2018 through March 2020 before quarantine restrictions were enforced.

On 11 November 2021, the same day that her third single from Cupido, "Bar", was released, Tini shared via social media that she would be embarking on her third concert tour, kicking-off on 21 March 2022–in her home country of Argentina, at the Hipódromo de Palermo. The tickets for that show also went on sale the same day she confirmed the tour. Tickets sold out in minutes, prompting Tini to schedule four more shows at the venue for 24, 25, 26 and 27 March 2022. These shows also sold out in minutes. With these concerts, Tini became the first female artist to ever sell out six shows at the Hipódromo de Palermo, as well as becoming the first Argentine artist to sell out a large stadium, at home, in over 20 years.

During January and February 2022, a series of festival shows were given, prior to the official start of the tour. This way, Tini was able to preview the show and songs to fans, giving concerts in Argentina, Bolivia and Chile. On 10 March 2022, Tini announced that the concerts at the Hipódromo had to be postponed until May due to her father's health issues and subsequent hospitalization. After these dates, Tini then announced new tour dates for other countries on the first Latin American leg.

The European leg of the tour, which included eleven shows across Spain, was announced on 15 December 2022. On 5 February 2023, Tini gave a press conference in Miami, Florida, where she confirmed three American cities added to the tour: Miami, New York City, and Los Angeles. It was to be her first time performing as a headliner in the USA. Pre-sale tickets went on sale 3 May, at 7 p.m. local time; regular tickets went on sale two days later, on 5 May.

== Concert synopsis ==
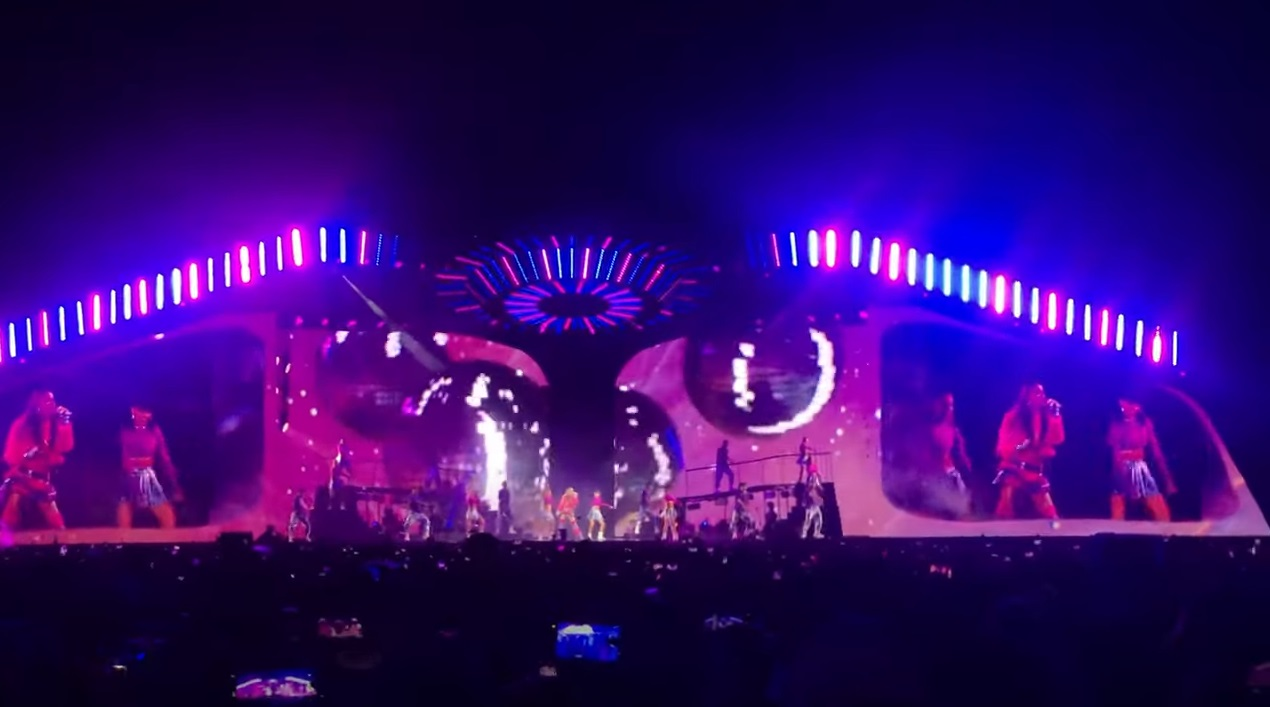
Tini performing in Buenos Aires, Argentina in May 2022

A countdown timer appears on the main video screen, counting down the minutes until the show begins. The stage set was designed in a pink, girly style, with Tini and her dancers all wearing various pink outfits. The live band began playing an extended interlude, until Tini appeared at the top of the stage, where a drummer was waiting for her. She then started playing the drums herself while a platform slowly moved her down to center stage. From there, Tini was joined by her troupe of six to eight dancers and began to perform “Te Quiero Más”. During Nacho's verses, Tini joined her dancers for a dance sequence.

Tini then went on to perform “Quiero Volver”, a song which she had released with her former partner, Colombian singer Sebastián Yatra. This performance was a viral hit on social networks, mainly on TikTok, due to the popular dance they created for the tour. Next came “Suéltate el Pelo”, with the added surprise of pyrotechnics. Tini, as she has been known to do while touring, added a new verse to the song. She continued with “Duele”, and also showcased some sensual steps of Argentine tango with one of her dancers, Camila Lucca.

Tini continued with “Recuerdo”—during the first verse of the song, fireworks were launched from the stage. Unlike other artists, when performing duets or collaborations live and solo, Tini usually does not edit-out the other artists’ verses (or break the song down into only her sections), but rather uses the time for dance breaks, adding further visual appeal. Next, “Maldita Foto” (recorded with Colombian singer Manuel Turizo) and “2:50 Remix” were performed.

Tini then took a brief break and returned with a new costume change, signifying the romantic ballads portion of the show, a part of her shows she says she will "never stop doing". She began with "Por Qué Te Vas" followed by "Oye", during which time stepped in front of the stage and shook hands with people in the front row. More love songs and ballads followed, including "Un Beso en Madrid", "Acércate", "Carne y Hueso" and "Consejo de Amor".

A third costume reveal came next, with the singer and dancers appearing in shiny green suits to match the rhythm of the electronic music. “Ella Dice”, “Playa”, “High Remix” and “Fresa” (with slightly modified live versions) were performed. Next, pink and feminine tones would once again consume the stage, with Tini in a two-piece, diamond-dripping outfit, as she sang “Fantasí”.

In her music videos, Tini had intended to use short and simple choreography that fans could easily watch and learn, and feel they are dancing 'with her' during the concerts (and thus be recorded on TikTok to help her songs go viral); the objective was fulfilled. During “La Triple T”, audience members who knew the moves were encouraged to follow. Next was "Bar" and "22", with colorful effects around the stage. The last song of the concert was her hit duet with María Becerra, “Miénteme”; as the song ends, Tini thanks the audience, as confetti and fireworks rained down from the stage. On the American tour dates (Miami, New York and Los Angeles), Tini ended the shows speaking directly—and emotionally—to the audiences, thanking them for their support, before singing an encore of the Whitney Houston classic “I Will Always Love You” (written by Dolly Parton), much to fans' and critics' enjoyment. Many people were impressed with the quality of Tini's voice and her powerful delivery of the classic love anthem.

== Set list ==
=== 2022 ===
This set list is representative of the concert on 23 December 2022. It does not represent all concerts for the duration of the tour.

Act 1

1. "22"
2. "Quiero Volver"
3. "Suéltate el Pelo"
4. "Duele"
5. "Recuerdo"
6. "El Último Beso"
7. "Maldita Foto"
8. "2:50 (Remix)"

Act 2

9. "Por Que Te Vas"
10. "Oye"
11. "Un Beso en Madrid"
12. "Diciembre"
13. "Carne y Hueso"
14. "Acércate"

Act 3

15. "Ella Dice" (with elements of "Rakata" by Wisin & Yandel and "La Noche de Anoche" by Bad Bunny and Rosalía)
16. "High (Remix)"
17. "Fresa" (with elements of "Faded" by Alan Walker)

Act 4

18. "Fantasi"
19. "La Triple T"
20. "La Loto"
21. "Bar"
22. "Miénteme"

=== 2023 ===
This set list is representative of the concert on 24 June 2023. It does not represent all concerts for the duration of the tour.

Act 1

1. "22"
2. "Quiero Volver"
3. "Las Jordans"
4. "La Niña de la Escuela"
5. "El Último Beso"
6. "Maldita Foto"
7. "2:50 (Remix)"

Act 2

8. "Por Que Te Vas"
9. "Oye"
10. "7 Veces"
11. "Corazón Partío" (Alejandro Sanz cover)
12. "Carne y Hueso"
13. "Te Pido"

Act 3

14. "Ella Dice" (with elements of "Rakata" by Wisin & Yandel and "La Noche de Anoche" by Bad Bunny and Rosalía)
15. "High (Remix)"
16. "Fresa" (with elements of "Faded" by Alan Walker)
17. "Cupido"

Act 4

18. "Fantasi"
19. "La Triple T"
20. "Muñecas"
21. "Bar"
22. "Miénteme"
Notes
- During the first presentation at the Buenos Aires Hipodromo, Tini performed "Recuerdo" together with Mau y Ricky and "2:50 (Remix)" with MYA.
- During the second performance at the Buenos Aires Hipodromo, Tini sang "2:50 (Remix)" with MYA and "Bar" with L-Gante.
- During the third performance at the Buenos Aires Hipodromo, Khea joined Tini on stage to perform "Ella Dice" and, again, together with MYA she performed "2:50 (Remix)".
- During the fourth presentation at the Buenos Aires Hipodromo, Tini repeated the guests from the previous day, although this time John C was added performing "Duele", Lola Índigo performing "High (Remix)", and Beéle with "Fantasi".
- During the fifth presentation at the Buenos Aires Hipodromo, the Star+ broadcast was recorded and several singers were invited to sing along with Tini, among them were John C, Mau y Ricky, Manuel Turizo, MYA, Cami, Morat, María Becerra, Lola Índigo and Beéle.
- During the sixth performance at the Buenos Aires Hipodromo, Tini sang "2:50 (Remix)" with MYA and "Bar" with L-Gante.
- During the first performance at Tucumán, Tini sang for the first time a snippet of her new single, "La Loto".
- During the first performance at Mariano Roque Alonso, Tini removed "Consejo de Amor" from set list, and performed "La Loto".
- During the concerts in Corrientes, Tini invited Elena Rose to perform "Carne y Hueso" with her.
- During the concert in Salta, Tini performed "El Último Beso" for the first time and added it on the set list for future tour dates.
- During the concert in Madrid, Tini invited Becky G to perform "La Loto", and María Becerra to perform "Miénteme" with her.
- During the concerts at Campo Argentino de Polo, Tini sang encore the "Himno Nacional Argentino" with Airbag in honor of Argentina national football team that won 2022 FIFA World Cup.
- During the last concert at Campo Argentino de Polo in 2022, Tini sang encore the "Muchachos, Ahora Nos Volvimos a Ilusionar" (Winner's Version) with Airbag and Argentina's National Team players Rodrigo De Paul and Leandro Paredes on stage.
- During the three concert on Mexico and of performance at Córdoba, Argentina in February 2023, Tini added "Por el Resto de Tu Vida" it on the set list.
- During the performance at Monterrey, Mexico, Tini sang "Hoy Somos Más", a "Violetta" song instead of "Acércate".
- During the performance at Mexico City, Mexico, Tini sang of single, "Siempre Brillarás" instead of "Acércate".
- During the performance at Córdoba, Spain, Tini sang for the first time a snippet of single, "Me Enteré".
- During the performance at Cádiz, Spain, Tini sang a snippet of "Ser Mejor", a "Violetta" song.
- During the performance at Fuengirola, Spain, Tini sang a snippet of "En Mi Mundo", a "Violetta" song.
- During the performance at Murcia, Spain, Tini sang a snippet of "Acércate" and "Te Creo", a "Violetta" song.
- During the performance at Roquetas de Mar, Spain, Tini sang a snippet of "Diciembre" and "Crecimos Juntos", a "Violetta" song.
- During the performance at Murcia, Roquetas de Mar, Sevilla and Madrid, Spain, Tini did not perform "7 Veces".
- During the performance at Sevilla and Madrid, Spain, Tini replace "2:50 (Remix)" from set list with "Me Enteré" (with elements of "Gasolina" by Daddy Yankee).
- During the performance at Madrid, Spain, Tini performed "La Niña de la Escuela" and "El Tonto" with Lola Índigo.
- During the three concert on United States, Tini added "I Will Always Love You" by Dolly Parton and also Whitney Houston it on the set list.

== Tour dates ==
List of concerts, showing date, city, country, venue, opening acts, tickets sold, number of available tickets and amount of gross revenue
Date	City	Country	Venue	Opening acts	Attendance
Tini Tour 2022
South America
20 May 2022 (Note: The concert was previously scheduled for 21 March 2022, marking the beginning of the tour, but was postponed due to her father's health issues and hospitalization, to 20 May from its original March date.)	Buenos Aires	Argentina	Hipódromo de Palermo	—N/a	136,000 / 136,000
21 May 2022 (Note: The concert was previously scheduled for 24 March 2022, but was postponed due to her father's health issues and hospitalization, to 21 May, from its original March date.)	Buenos Aires	Argentina	Hipódromo de Palermo	—N/a	136,000 / 136,000
22 May 2022 (Note: The concert was previously scheduled for 25 March 2022, but was postponed due to her father's health issues and hospitalization, to 22 May, from its original March date.)	Buenos Aires	Argentina	Hipódromo de Palermo	—N/a	136,000 / 136,000
27 May 2022 (Note: The concert was previously scheduled for 26 March 2022, but was postponed due to her father's health issues and hospitalization, to 27 May, from its original March date.)	Buenos Aires	Argentina	Hipódromo de Palermo	—N/a	136,000 / 136,000
28 May 2022 (Note: The concert was previously scheduled for 27 March 2022, but was postponed due to her father's health issues and hospitalization, to 28 May, from its original March date.)	Buenos Aires	Argentina	Hipódromo de Palermo	—N/a	136,000 / 136,000
31 May 2022	Buenos Aires	Argentina	Hipódromo de Palermo	—N/a	136,000 / 136,000
3 June 2022 (Note: The concert is part of the festivities for the 100 years of YPF.)	Villa Martelli	Argentina	Tecnópolis	—N/a	—N/a
5 June 2022 (Note: The concert was previously scheduled for 10 April 2022, but was postponed due to her father's health issues and hospitalization, to 5 June from its original April date.)	Córdoba	Argentina	Quality Estadio	—N/a	4,500 / 4,500
11 June 2022 (Note: The concert was previously scheduled for 9 April and later 4 June 2022, but was finally postponed to 11 June, because of the stage collapse.)	Santa Fe	Argentina	Club Unión	The Sistars	11,000 / 11,000
15 June 2022	Mendoza	Argentina	Arena Maipú	—N/a	15,000 / 15,000
16 June 2022	Mendoza	Argentina	Arena Maipú	—N/a	15,000 / 15,000
17 June 2022	Mendoza	Argentina	Arena Maipú	—N/a	15,000 / 15,000
1 July 2022	Tucumán	Argentina	Central Córdoba	—N/a	14,000 / 14,000
16 July 2022	Mariano Roque Alonso	Paraguay	Ruedo Central de la Expo	Cami Flecha	20,000 / 20,000
5 August 2022	La Rioja	Argentina	Superdomo	—N/a	26,000 / 26,000
6 August 2022	La Rioja	Argentina	Superdomo	—N/a	26,000 / 26,000
25 August 2022	Bogotá	Colombia	Movistar Arena	Ventino	7,553 / 8,500
27 August 2022	Guayaquil	Ecuador	Explanada El Dorado	—N/a	6,960 / 10,040
29 August 2022	Lima	Perú	Esplanada Olguin by Arena Perú	DJ Luigi	13,950 / 13,950
31 August 2022	Quito	Ecuador	Coliseo General Rumiñahui	CNCO	13,724 / 14,729
3 September 2022	Corrientes	Argentina	Anfiteatro Cocomarola	—N/a	30,000 / 30,000
4 September 2022	Corrientes	Argentina	Anfiteatro Cocomarola	—N/a	30,000 / 30,000
9 September 2022	Tucumán	Argentina	Central Córdoba	—N/a	22,000 / 22,000
10 September 2022	Tucumán	Argentina	Central Córdoba	—N/a	22,000 / 22,000
17 September 2022	Salta	Argentina	Estadio Martearena	—N/a	25,000 / 25,000
Europe
25 September 2022	Madrid	Spain	WiZink Center	—N/a	15,000 / 15,000
South America
5 October 2022	Junín	Argentina	Sociedad Rural	—N/a	9,399 / 10,000
7 October 2022	Montevideo	Uruguay	Estadio Centenario	Meri Deal	46,000 / 46,000
8 October 2022	São Paulo	Brazil	Vibra São Paulo	—N/a	6,700 / 7,000
26 October 2022	San Luis	Argentina	Campo de Polo Estancia Grande	—N/a	9,873 / 10,576
28 October 2022	Neuquén	Argentina	Espacio DUAM	—N/a	7,509 / 8,030
30 October 2022	Santiago	Chile	Movistar Arena	Gigi Caro	16,522 / 16,522
31 October 2022	Santiago	Chile	Gran Arena Monticello	—N/a	4,000 / 4,000
5 November 2022	La Plata	Argentina	Estadio UNO	—N/a	31,958 / 32,530
10 November 2022	Córdoba	Argentina	Estadio Mario Alberto Kempes	—N/a	114,000 / 114,000
11 November 2022	Córdoba	Argentina	Estadio Mario Alberto Kempes	—N/a	114,000 / 114,000
15 November 2022	Rosario	Argentina	Hipódromo Municipal Parque Independencia	—N/a	7,822 / 8,072
22 December 2022	Buenos Aires	Argentina	Campo Argentino de Polo	—N/a	60,000 / 60,000
23 December 2022	Buenos Aires	Argentina	Campo Argentino de Polo	—N/a	60,000 / 60,000
Tini Tour 2023
North America
2 February 2023	Guadalajara	Mexico	Auditorio Telmex	—N/a	—N/a
3 February 2023	Monterrey	Mexico	Auditorio Citibanamex	—N/a	6,962 / 8,200
5 February 2023	Mexico City	Mexico	Auditorio Nacional	—N/a	10,000 / 10,000
South America
10 February 2023 (Note: The concert is part of the Festival de Villa María.)	Córdoba	Argentina	Anfiteatro Villa María	—N/a	—N/a
19 February 2023 (Note: The concert is part of the Fiesta Nacional del Lago.)	El Calafate	Argentina	Anfiteatro del Bosque	—N/a	—N/a
20 February 2023 (Note: The concert is part of the Festival Internacional de Viña del Mar.)	Viña del Mar	Chile	Quinta Vergara	—N/a	—N/a
8 April 2023 (Note: The concert was previously scheduled for 22 October 2022 at Estadio Único Madre de Ciudades, but was postponed to 8 April 2023, because of technical reasons.)	Santiago del Estero	Argentina	Estadio Alfredo Terrera	—N/a	—N/a
Europe
24 June 2023	A Coruña	Spain	Coliseum	—N/a	65,000
25 June 2023	Barcelona	Spain	Palau Sant Jordi	—N/a	65,000
28 June 2023	Córdoba	Spain	Plaza de Toros	—N/a	65,000
1 July 2023 (Note: The concert is part of the Concert Music Festival.)	Cádiz	Spain	Poblado de Sancti Petri	—N/a	65,000
2 July 2023	Fuengirola	Spain	Marenostrum	—N/a	65,000
6 July 2023 (Note: The concert is part of the Concerts de Vivers.)	Valencia	Spain	Jardines de Viveros	—N/a	65,000
8 July 2023 (Note: The concert is part of the Granca Live Fest.)	Gran Canaria	Spain	Estadio Gran Canaria	—N/a	65,000
13 July 2023 (Note: The concert is part of the Murcia On Festival.)	Murcia	Spain	Plaza de Toros	—N/a	65,000
14 July 2023	Roquetas de Mar	Spain	Plaza de Toros	—N/a	65,000
14 September 2023 (Note: The concert is part of the Cabaret Festival.)	Sevilla	Spain	Centro Hípico Mariena de Aljarafe	—N/a	65,000
17 September 2023	Madrid	Spain	WiZink Center	—N/a	65,000
North America
2 November 2023	Miami	United States	Kaseya Center	—N/a	—N/a
3 November 2023	New York	United States	The Theater at Madison Square Garden	—N/a	—N/a
5 November 2023 (Note: The concert was previously scheduled for 31 October 2023 at Microsoft Theater, but was postponed to 5 November 2023, because of technical reasons.)	Los Angeles	United States	The Novo	—N/a	—N/a
