= Futttura World Tour =

2025–2027 concert tour by Tini

- Tour by Tini
- Location: Latin America; United States; Spain
- Associated albums: All of Tini's studio albums (Note: In addition to her solo albums, the tour also supports the soundtrack albums and music of the series Violetta, in which Tini played the titular character.)
- Start date: 25 October 2025
- No. of shows: 37
- Website: tinistoessel.com#tour

Tini concert chronology
- Tini Tour (2022–2023); Futttura World Tour (2025–2027)

The Futttura World Tour (also styled as Futttura - Tini World Tour) is the fourth concert tour by Argentine singer Tini. It began in Buenos Aires, Argentina, on October 25, 2025, and is expected to travel throughout the country, as well as to other Latin American countries. Described as "the most ambitious project" of her life, the show was conceived as a retrospective tribute encompassing all of her studio albums, including her beginnings on Violetta to her solo musical career, as correpsonding musical "eras".

== Background ==
During an interview on Susana Giménez show in December 2024, Tini revealed that she would return to the stage in 2025 with an innovative show that would span a full day and combine three stages simultaneously, offering a unique experience that would revisit the highlights of her life and career. Later that month, in an interview on the streaming show Rumis, the singer commented that the show would premiere in the second half of the following year. Meanwhile, her fans began speculating about the possible name of the show, suggesting options such as "Tini's World" or "Tinipalooza," a reference to the Lollapalooza music festival.

On March 27, 2025, billboards appeared on the streets of Buenos Aires with a black background, the phrase "The countdown begins," and the initials "TTT," generating speculation about a possible new project by the artist, related to her next album or a concert tour. During the following days, the singer shared various images of herself in her starring role in Violetta, the character that catapulted her to fame, increasing the anticipation among her fans. She also launched a countdown on her website that would end on April 3. Upon the conclusion of the countdown, Tini announced a free open-air concert in the Palermo Soho neighborhood, which would be streamed live on the La Casa YouTube channel. The event included interviews with music media outlets and an exclusive interview with Lizardo Ponce before the concert, where she sheared details about her upcoming projects and the tour.

The concerts at Tecnópolis, were conceived and created as a her own music festival, that featured the "Futttura Experience" and the "Tini Museum." The event also included themed food, drinks, merchandise, and a variety of bold activities hosted by partner brands such as Mercado Libre, BNA, YPF, Under Armour, Maybelline, and Pantene. These activities took place throughout the day, leading up to the start of the concert itself. On October 27, 2025, during the second show at Tecnópolis, another extra date at the venue, along with tour dates for the first Latin American leg that include stadium shows in Santiago de Chile, Montevideo, Asunción, Córdoba and Tucumán, were annouced and displayed on the large LED screens. The dates for the second Latin American leg were revealed in April 2026, and in the coming days trough her social media accounts. On February 27, 2026, Tini annouced the Spanish dates for the tour, which included performances in Barcelona, Madrid and Valencia. The concerts in Spain marked the tour's only stop in Europe.

== Stage and aesthetic ==
The stage design for the tour was conceived by British production designer Vince Foster of LightDesign.UK, who worked with other international artist such as Pink, Shakira, Janet Jackson, Elton John, Spice Girls, George Michael and others. Foster developed a three-stage configuration (for the stadium shows) and design concept that representing different periods of Tini's musical career: her past that includes her beginnings, and her Violetta era, present her development as contemporary Latin pop artist, and future her Futttura intentiti and futuristic musical direction. The production's creative direction was led by Buenos Aires - based creative studio POGO, which was responsible for the show's creative and scenic direction, lighting, production design, visual content and choreography-related visual elements.

The original production at Tecnópolis and for the stadium shows featured three large-scale stages, mobile scenic structures and an extensive LED display system. The main stage incorporated a circular overhead installation inspired by the UFO imagery associated with the singer's show project. The production utilized approximately 2,000 square metres of LED displays, including a 100-metre-wide main LED screen and side screens measuring 33 by 14 metres. The main-stage displays reached heights of up to 14 metres. Hydraulic platforms were also incorporated into the staging, allowing Tini to perform at elevated positions during the show. The show was divided into three acts, each featuring distinct visual elements, choreography and musical styles. The production included more than 30 songs and over 20 dancers performing simultaneously.

A Spanish stylist Michael Lorigados was in charge of styling the outfits for the tour. The wardrobe featured five specially created looks for Tini, designed to complement the production's futuristic and theatrical aesthetic. The designers and fashion labels involved included Luis De Javier, Dreaming Eli, Dsquared2 and Argentine designer Ricky Sarkany. Additional wardrobe collaborations took place during the tour, including a trench coat designed by Uruguayan fashion student Carmela González, which TINI wore during her February 22, 2026 performance in Montevideo.

== Critical reception ==
Milagros Jarzun, of Clarín, described the show as a production "of international caliber," asserting that "it has nothing to envy from anything abroad" and that Futttura set a precedent that will endure in the history of live music in Argentina. However, in her review, she noted certain negative aspects related to the organization of the pre-concert activities, particularly regarding entry to the venue, which she described as "disorganized." Yanet Ingravallo of Todo Noticias opined that "Futttura's debut was devastating. With a show lasting over three hours, Tini demonstrated the physical preparation she had undergone to give her all in each of the choreographies, skills, and runs down the catwalk." Lupe Torres, of the newspaper La Nación, highlighted that the performance "was characterized by a sweeping presentation, full of energy and talent." She also emphasized "the majesty of the stage design" and Tini's musical evolution, as well as her versatility throughout the concert. Daniela Dominguez of AD Magazine praised the artistic direction and stage production of the show, and described the show as a "milestone for the music industry". She also highlighted its combination of music, fashion, architecture, technology and visual storytelling, arguing that the production redefined the standards of live entertainment and represented a cultural event beyond its musical and commercial success. Lucía Inés López of La Capital pointed out that: [Tini] no longer needs labels: "she has left behind any limiting definition—she is no longer just Violetta or La Triple T—to establish herself as a complete artistic figure, with her own identity and an increasingly deep connection with her audience".

== Disputes ==
In August 2026, reports emerged of a financial dispute between the singer and her father, Alejandro Stoessel, who had managed her career for approximately 15 years. Following the end of their professional relationship, the singer commissioned an audit of the companies responsible for administering the revenues generated by her music, image rights, commercial agreements and live performances. According to the findings reported by Infobae, and the Argentine medias, the audit indicated that Tini had no ownership stake or direct control over several of the companies managing her career-related earnings. According to various reports, it involves her wealth valued at more than 70 million american dollars.

The reports further alleged that her father and brother Francisco Stoessel had retained control over the financial and corporate structures through which her professional income was managed. The findings prompted Tini to seek greater control over her assets, and the businesses associated with her career. In June 2026, she reportedly gained independent access to a bank account in her name through the intervention of her lawyer. The dispute subsequently attracted widespread media attention, with reports describing a deterioration in her relationship with members of her family.

On October 6, 2026, the concert scheduled for October 25 at Arena CDMX in Mexico City that repoortedly selling approximantrly 85 % of its avaliable tickets was cancelled. Organizers Zignia Live, Music Vibe and Arena CDMX announced the cancellation, citing circumstances beyond their control, without providing a specific explanation. On October 18, the tour's scheduled performance at the Kaseya Center in Miami was also cancelled just 25 minutes before its scheduled start. In a subsequent statement, Stoessel's legal representative attributed the cancellation to the local promoter's alleged failure to fulfil contractual technical and safety requirements. The statement explained that incomplete stage installations and unavailable technical equipment had prevented essential safety checks and rehearsals from taking place. Stoessel's legal team subsequently announced that it was evaluating possible legal action concerning the alleged contractual breaches. Besides the tour's production and commecercial arrangments were also linked to the business network supporting Alejandro Stoessel. AKE Music, a production and advertising company owned by Aquiles Rojo, a longtime bussines assoicate of Alejandro, was involved in the production control and advertising commercalization of the tour.

According to various media reports, additional European dates for the tour, beyond the already announced Spanish dates, had been considered, including performances in France, Germany and Italy. However, in August 2026, Tini reportedly decided against expanding the tour amid an financial dispute, and was unwilling to add further international dates until the financial and legal arrangements surrounding her career and the tour had been resolved.

== Set list ==
The following setlist was obtained from the 25 October 2025 concert, held at the Tecnópolis in Buenos Aires, Argentina. It does not represent all concerts for the duration of the tour.

1. "El Cielo" + "Fresa"
2. "La Loto" / "Muñecas"
3. "Las Jordans"
4. "Me Enteré"
5. "En mi Mundo"
6. "Como Quieres"
7. "Te Creo"
8. "Ser Mejor"
9. "Siempre Brillarás"
10. "22"
11. "Suéltate el Pelo"
12. "Cupido"
13. "Miedo"
14. "Pa"
15. "Posta" / "Ni de Ti"
16. "Ángel"
17. "Buenos Aires"
18. "Tinta 90"
19. "Ellas"
20. "Bien"
21. "Me Voy"
22. "Down"
23. "High Remix"
24. "La Original" / "Blackout"
25. "Una noche Más"
26. "Me Gusta"
27. "Buenos Aires"(techno version)
28. "Si tú Te Vas"
29. "Te Pido"
30. "Acércate"
31. "Carne y Hueso"
32. "De Papel"
33. "Por que Te Vas"
34. "Fantasi"
35. "Universidad"
36. "Lágrimas"
37. "Maldita Foto"
38. "36 Vidas"
39. "La Triple T"
40. "Bar"
41. "Miénteme"
42. "Cupido"

== Shows ==
List of 2025 concerts showing date, city, country, venue and opening acts
Date	City	Country	Venue	Opening act(s)
25 October	Buenos Aires	Argentina	Tecnópolis	—N/a
27 October (Note: The concert was previously scheduled for 24 October 2025, marking the beginning of the tour, but was postponed due to the adverse weather alert and conditions, to 27 October from its original date.)	Buenos Aires	Argentina	Tecnópolis	—N/a
31 October	Buenos Aires	Argentina	Tecnópolis	—N/a
1 November	Buenos Aires	Argentina	Tecnópolis	—N/a
2 November	Buenos Aires	Argentina	Tecnópolis	—N/a
7 November	Buenos Aires	Argentina	Tecnópolis	—N/a
8 November	Buenos Aires	Argentina	Tecnópolis	—N/a
15 November	Buenos Aires	Argentina	Tecnópolis	—N/a
16 November	Buenos Aires	Argentina	Tecnópolis	—N/a

List of 2026 concerts showing date, city, country, venue and opening acts
Date	City	Country	Venue	Opening act(s)
12 February	Santiago	Chile	Estadio Nacional	Maya Okey
22 February	Montevideo	Uruguay	Estadio Centenario	—N/a
7 March	Asunción	Paraguay	Jockey Club	Lia Love
20 March	Córdoba	Argentina	Estadio Kempes	Q' Lokura
21 March	Córdoba	Argentina	Estadio Kempes	Q' Lokura
1 April	Tucumán	Argentina	Tucumán Hippodrome	—N/a
18 April	Rosario	Argentina	Estadio Newell's Old Boys	—N/a
16 May	Salta	Argentina	Estadio Martearena	—N/a
30 May	Lima	Peru	Estadio Nacional del Peru	—N/a
2 September	Guadalajara	Mexico	Arena Guadalajara	—N/a
4 September	Mexico City	Mexico	Arena CDMX	—N/a
7 September	Monterrey	Mexico	Arena Monterrey	—N/a
10 September	San José	Costa Rica	Parque Viva	—N/a
13 September (Note: Originally scheduled for 12 September 2026, the show was rescheduled due to adverse weather conditions.)	San Salvador	El Salvador	Estadio Las Delicias	—N/a
15 September	Panama City	Panama	Plaza Amador	—N/a
18 September	Bogotá	Colombia	Movistar Arena	—N/a
20 September	Guayaquil	Ecuador	Estadio Modelo	—N/a
22 September	Quito	Ecuador	Coliseo General Rumiñahui	—N/a
16 October	Guatemala City	Guatemala	Explanada 5	—N/a
21 October	Caracas	Venezuela	Estadio Monumental de Caracas Simón Bolívar	—N/a

List of 2027 concerts showing date, city, country, venue and opening acts
Date	City	Country	Venue	Opening act(s)
19 January	Valencia	Spain	Roig Arena	—N/a
20 January	Valencia	Spain	Roig Arena	—N/a
22 January	Barcelona	Spain	Palau Sant Jordi	—N/a
23 January	Barcelona	Spain	Palau Sant Jordi	—N/a
24 January	Barcelona	Spain	Palau Sant Jordi	—N/a
26 January	Madrid	Spain	Movistar Arena	—N/a
27 January	Madrid	Spain	Movistar Arena	—N/a
28 January	Madrid	Spain	Movistar Arena	—N/a

=== Cancelled shows ===
List of cancelled shows
Date	City	Country	Venue	Reason
25 October, 2026	Mexico City	Mexico	Arena CDMX	Unknown reasons
18 October, 2026	Miami	United States	Kaseya Center	Unfulfilled technical and production requirements
