= List of Billboard Argentina Hot 100 top-ten singles in 2022 =

This is a list of singles that charted in the top ten of the Billboard Argentina Hot 100 chart in 2022.

== Top-ten singles ==
Key

- ◁ – indicates single's top 10 entry was also its Hot 100 debut

List of Billboard Hot 100 top ten singles that peaked in 2022
Top ten entry date	Single	Artist(s)	Peak	Peak date	Weeks in top ten	Ref.
Singles from 2021
December 19	"Tacones Rojos" (Note: The single re-entered the top ten on the week ending February 20, 2022.)	Sebastián Yatra	7	January 9	8	
December 26	"BB"	MYA and Emilia	4	January 2	9	
Singles from 2022
January 9	"Otra Noche" (Note: The single re-entered the top ten on the week ending March 20, 2022.)	Los Ángeles Azules and Nicki Nicole	7	February 20	9	
January 16	"Tiago PZK: Bzrp Music Sessions, Vol. 48" (Note: The single re-entered the top ten on the week ending March 27, 2022.)	Bizarrap and Tiago PZK	3	January 16	11	
January 23	"De Enero a Diciembre" (Note: The single re-entered the top ten on the week ending February 6, 2022.)	Emilia and Rusherking	8	February 6	3	
January 30	"Titan"	Salas	7	January 30	1	
January 30	"Tranquila" (Note: The single re-entered the top ten on the week ending May 15, 2022.) ◁	FMK and María Becerra	3	February 13	15	
February 6	"Desesperados"	Rauw Alejandro and Chencho Corleone	4	March 20	12	
February 6	"Top 5"	Duki	8	February 13	4	
February 27	"La Trampa Es Ley"	Lit Killah	2	February 27	4	
February 27	"Yendo No, Llegando"	Perro Primo, El Noba and R Jota featuring DJ Plaga and DT.Bilardo	9	February 27	1	
March 6	"Universo Paralelo"	La K'onga featuring Nahuel Pennisi	2	March 20	12	
March 6	"Marte" (Note: The single re-entered the top ten on the week ending June 26, 2022.) (Note: The single re-entered the top ten on the week ending July 10, 2022.)	Sofía Reyes and María Becerra	6	March 20	18	
March 6	"Fantasi"	Tini and Beéle	7	March 20	7	
March 13	"Residente: Bzrp Music Sessions, Vol. 49" ◁	Bizarrap and Residente	1	March 13	2	
March 27	"Mamiii" (Note: The single re-entered the top ten on the week ending April 10, 2022.)	Becky G and Karol G	9	March 27	5	
April 3	"Plan A" ◁	Paulo Londra	1	April 3	9	
April 3	"Esto Recién Empieza"	Duki and Emilia	9	April 3	2	
April 10	"Felices x Siempre"	María Becerra	8	April 10	1	
April 17	"Chance" ◁	Paulo Londra	4	April 17	4	
April 17	"Cuatro Veinte"	Emilia	2	May 1	10	
April 24	"Arrancármelo" (Note: The single re-entered the top ten on the week ending January 8, 2023.)	Wos	6	April 24	4	
April 24	"Si Quieren Frontear"	Duki, De La Ghetto and Quevedo	6	May 8	8	
May 1	"As It Was"	Harry Styles	2	May 29	10	
May 8	"Paulo Londra: Bzrp Music Sessions, Vol. 23"	Bizarrap and Paulo Londra	1	May 8	4	
May 22	"La Triple T" (Note: The single re-entered the top ten on the week ending September 11, 2022.) (Note: The single re-entered the top ten on the week ending October 16, 2022.)	Tini	1	May 22	17	
May 22	"Provenza"	Karol G	4	June 19	11	
May 29	"Ojitos Lindos"	Bad Bunny and Bomba Estéreo	5	June 5	10	
May 29	"Moscow Mule" (Note: The single re-entered the top ten on the week ending July 3, 2022.) (Note: The single re-entered the top ten on the week ending July 17, 2022.)	Bad Bunny	8	July 17	5	
June 5	"Te Felicito" (Note: The single re-entered the top ten on the week ending September 18, 2022.)	Shakira and Rauw Alejandro	1	June 26	15	
June 5	"Me Porto Bonito" (Note: The single re-entered the top ten on the week ending October 9, 2022.)	Bad Bunny and Chencho Corleone	4	June 26	17	
June 19	"Ojalá"	María Becerra	2	July 17	19	
June 19	"Tamo Chelo" (Note: The single, which had originally peaked at No. 80, re-entered the chart directly into the top ten on the week ending June 19, 2022 following the singer's death.)	El Noba	8	June 19	1	
June 19	"Tití Me Preguntó" (Note: The single re-entered the top ten on the week ending September 4, 2022.)	Bad Bunny	5	July 17	12	
June 26	"Intoxicao"	Emilia and Nicki Nicole	8	June 26	4	
July 10	"Villano Antillano: Bzrp Music Sessions, Vol. 51"	Bizarrap and Villano Antillano	10	July 10	1	
July 24	"Quevedo: Bzrp Music Sessions, Vol. 52"	Bizarrap and Quevedo	1	July 24	29	
July 24	"La Loto" ◁	Tini, Becky G and Anitta	7	July 24	4	
July 24	"Tu Turrito"	Rei and Callejero Fino	3	August 21	26	
August 7	"Givenchy" (Note: The single re-entered the top ten on the week ending October 23, 2022.)	Duki	2	August 7	10	
August 7	"N5" (Note: The single re-entered the top ten on the week ending August 28, 2022.)	Lali	9	August 7	3	
August 21	"Despechá"	Rosalía	2	August 28	26	
August 21	"La Bachata"	Manuel Turizo	1	September 18	29	
August 21	"Cómo Dormiste?"	Rels B	6	August 28	6	
September 25	"Automático" ◁	María Becerra	3	October 30	14	
September 25	"Mission 10"	Alan Gómez and Callejero Fino	6	October 2	8	
October 2	"El Último Beso" ◁	Tini and Tiago PZK	7	October 2	5	
October 2	"Party en el Barrio"	Paulo Londra and Duki	8	October 2	1	
October 9	"Fernet"	Rei and Quevedo	7	October 30	4	
October 30	"Butakera"	La Joaqui, El Noba and Alan Gómez	9	October 30	4	
October 30	"Perfecta" (Note: The single re-entered the top ten on the week ending December 25, 2022.)	Rusherking and Dread Mar I	6	November 6	8	
November 6	"Monotonía" (Note: The single re-entered the top ten on the week ending December 18, 2022.) ◁	Shakira and Ozuna	7	November 6	5	
November 6	"Besos Moja2"	Wisin & Yandel and Rosalía	6	November 27	12	
November 20	"Dos Besitos"	La Joaqui, Salastkbron and Gusty DJ	4	December 18	11	
November 27	"Cómo Chilla Ella" ◁	Ysy A	5	November 27	4	
December 4	"Duki: Bzrp Music Sessions, Vol. 50"	Bizarrap and Duki	1	December 4	3	

=== 2021 peaks ===
List of Billboard Hot 100 top ten singles in 2022 that peaked in 2021
Top ten entry date	Single	Artist(s)	Peak	Peak date	Weeks in top ten	Ref.
July 25	"Entre Nosotros" (Note: The single re-entered the top ten on the week ending January 16, 2022.)	Tiago PZK, Lit Killah, María Becerra and Nicki Nicole (Note: María Becerra and Nicki Nicole started being credited as co-lead artists from the week ending January 16, 2022.)	1	August 8	37	
August 29	"Pepas"	Farruko	3	October 3	18	
September 12	"Wow Wow"	María Becerra featuring Becky G	2	September 26	15	
September 19	"Turraka (Remix)"	Kaleb di Masi and Blunted Vato featuring Ecko and Papichamp	1	September 26	17	
October 17	"Rápido Lento"	Emilia and Tiago PZK	2	October 31	15	
October 24	"Antes de Ti"	Rusherking and María Becerra	3	November 7	12	
November 7	"Salimo de Noche"	Tiago PZK and Trueno	1	November 14	15	
November 21	"Bar" ◁	Tini and L-Gante	1	November 28	20	
December 5	"Dance Crip"	Trueno	3	December 19	13	

=== 2023 peaks ===
List of Billboard Hot 100 top ten singles in 2022 that peaked in 2023
Top ten entry date	Single	Artist(s)	Peak	Peak date	Weeks in top ten	Ref.
December 25	"Muchachos, Ahora Nos Volvimos a Ilusionar"	La Mosca Tsé - Tsé	1	January 1	2	
December 25	"Turreo Sessions #723"	DJ Tao and Callejero Fino	7	January 1	4	

== See also ==
- List of Billboard Argentina Hot 100 number-one singles of 2022

== Notes ==
Notes for re-entries
