= Hiroquest 2: Double Helix =

Studio album by Steve Aoki
- Released: November 17, 2023
- Length: 70:59
- Label: Dim Mak; DJ Kid Millionaire
- Producer: Steve Aoki (exec.); Alok Petrillo; Andrés Torres; Ariaz en el Area; Aviram Saharai; The Bestsoundz; The Boy Santeh; Carl Ryden; Christian Karlsson; Christopher Lunde; Dardan Aliu; DJ NB; Donny Flores; Elena Rose; Gazü Steve; Jacob Durrett; Joaquinha de la Riva; Jonah Shy; Josh Chergui; Loïs Serre; Martina Stoessel; Matan Kadosh; Max Styler; MGMT; Mick Kastenholt; Mr Whistler; Nikolas Lunde; Osmar Escobar; Philip Leigh; Quinten van den Berg; Sebastian Atas; Sjoerd Janssen; Suave from the 8; Timothy Smith; Tony Claessens; Wouter Janssen; Wouter van de Ridder; Mitchell Vreeswijk

Steve Aoki chronology
Hiroquest: Genesis (2022)	Hiroquest 2: Double Helix (2023)	Paragon (2024)

Singles from Hiroquest: Genesis
- 1. "New York" Released: January 6, 2023; 2. "Muñecas" Released: January 12, 2023; 3. "Diferente" Released: February 3, 2023; 4. "Hungry Heart" Released: March 3, 2023; 5. "Wild" Released: March 24, 2023; 6. "The Show" Released: May 26, 2023; 7. "Invítame A Un Café" Released: June 16, 2023; 8. "Motor" Released: July 7, 2023; 9. "Won't Forget This Time" Released: August 4, 2023; 10. "Locked Up" Released: August 18, 2023; 11. "Kids" Released: September 1, 2023; 12. "Paranoia" Released: September 15, 2023; 13. "Lighter" Released: October 20, 2023; 14. "Us" Released: November 17, 2023; 15. "Cartagena" Released: November 17, 2023

Hiroquest 2: Double Helix is the eighth studio album by American DJ and producer Steve Aoki. Released on November 17, 2023, the album is the second installment in Aoki's Hiroquest series of albums, following Hiroquest: Genesis (2022).

== Background ==
Hiroquest: Double Helix was released on November 17, 2023. It was distributed through Aoki's own label Dim Mak Records, after months of frequent single releases. Though Aoki had planned to expand Hiroquest: Genesis into a series since its original conception, the subtitle of the second album, Double Helix, and its release date, were revealed in August 2023.

Shortly before the album's release, Aoki announced his own fan convention in Los Angeles in support of the release; it took place for four hours on November 19. The convention, doubling as a release party for the album, included cosplayers, free tattoos, and live music by Aoki.

=== Concept ===
Similarly to its predecessor, Double Helix is a concept album, continuing the story of the meta human Hiro, a dramatization of Aoki himself, on his journey to save the world from Hyro, his evil counterpart.

A graphic novel based on the album and written by Jim Krueger will be released in 2024, in addition to more trading cards for his Hiroquest trading card game in collaboration with MetaZoo. Of his Hiroquest album series, Aoki says "I really treat [it] like it's a company in a way that has a lot of branches and different ways to grow the IP. And so I think of [it] as very similar in that approach, because I love creating brands and building stories and building worlds".

== Remix album ==
A completely remixed version of the album, Aoki's fifth remix album Hiroquest: Double Helix Remixed, was released on January 26, 2024.

== Track listing ==
Hiroquest 2: Double Helix track listing
No.	Title	Writer(s)	Producer(s)	Length
1.	"Double Helix"	Steve Aoki	Aoki	3:45
2.	"Prizm" (with Timmy Trumpet featuring Sweet Minxxx)	Aoki; Lindsay Stahl; Ross Aubrey	Aoki; Timothy Smith	2:18
3.	"Paranoia" (with Danna Paola)	Aoki; Osmar Escobar; Paola; Max Styler; The Bestsoundz; Ariaz en el Area	Aoki; Escobar; Styler; The Bestsoundz	3:00
4.	"Lighter" (with Paris Hilton)	Aoki; Hilton; Scott Harris; Emily Warren; Philip Leigh; Jonah Shy	Aoki; Leigh; Shy	2:46
5.	"Hungry Heart" (with Galantis featuring Hayley Kiyoko)	Aoki; Kiyoko; Joe Janiak; Sean Douglas; Mr Whistler; Bloodshy	Aoki; Christian Karlsson; Mr Whistler	3:02
6.	"Us" (featuring Ernest)	Aoki; Jacob Durrett; Ernest Smith; Rhett Akins	Aoki; Durrett	3:16
7.	"Won't Forget This Time" (with Kaaze featuring John Martin)	Aoki; Mick Kastenholt; Daniel Ledinsky; John Martin; Michel Zitron	Aoki; Kastenholt	3:21
8.	"Wild" (with Vini Vici)	Aoki; Mars Bonfire; Aviram Saharai; Nissim Kadosh	Aoki; Matan Kadosh; Aviram Saharai	2:15
9.	"2 Much 2 Handle" (with Alok)	Aoki; Alok Petrillo; Sebastian Atas	Aoki; Petrillo; Atas	3:08
10.	"Brothers" (with Brohug)	Aoki; Christopher Lunde; Nikolas Lunde	Aoki; Christopher Lunde; Nikolas Lunde	2:40
11.	"Invítame A Un Café" (with Ángela Aguilar)	Aoki; Escobar; Rocio Durcal; Aguilar "la pelona"; The Boy Santeh; Ariaz en el Area	Aoki; The Bestsoundz	3:07
12.	"Cartagena" (featuring Greeicy)	Aoki; Greeicy Rendón; Ariaz en el Area; Mike Bahía; Osmar Escobar; The Boy Santeh	Aoki	2:43
13.	"Muñecas" (with Tini and la Joaqui)	Aoki; Escobar; Mauricio Rengifo; Andrés Torres	Aoki; Escobar; Martina Stoessel; Donny Flores; Torres; Joaquinha de la Riva; The Boy Santeh; DJ NB; Elena Rose; Ariaz en el Area; Gazü Steve; Suave from the 8	2:36
14.	"Diferente" (featuring CNCO)	Aoki; Bigram Zayas; Carlos Enrique Briceno; Jose Toussaint Hernandez	Aoki	3:19
15.	"Locked Up" (with Trinix featuring Akon)	Aoki; Aliaune Thiam; Josh Chergui; Loïs Serre; Styler	Aoki; Thiam; Chergui; Serre; Styler	2:27
16.	"The Show" (with JJ Lin)	Aoki; James Daniel Lewis; Carl Ryden	Aoki; Ryden	3:27
17.	"Perfect" (featuring PnB Rock and 24hrs)	Aoki; Rakim Allen; Robert Davis III	Aoki	4:04
18.	"I'll Be Okay" (featuring Global Dan)	Aoki; Daniel McMannis; Dell Ngonga; Imad Royal	Aoki	2:55
19.	"New York" (with Regard featuring Mazie)	Aoki; Carlie Hanson; Dardan Aliu; Grace Christian; Justin Gammella; Micah Premnath; Phil Good	Aoki; Aliu	2:12
20.	"Motor" (with Quintino)	Aoki; Quinten van den Berg; Thomas Helsloot	Aoki; van den Berg	3:02
21.	"Mirror Mirror" (with Showtek and Jem Cooke)	Aoki; Sjoerd Janssen; Wouter Janssen; Jemma Cooke	Aoki; S. Janssen; W. Janssen	4:07
22.	"Kids" (with Tony Junior featuring MGMT)	Aoki; Andrew VanWyngarden; Ben Goldwasser; Dave Fridmann; Tony Claessens	Aoki; Claessens; MGMT; Wouter van de Ridder; Mitchell Vreeswijk	4:08
23.	"Hyro" (featuring Garrett Gunderson)	Aoki	Aoki	3:21
Total length:				70:59

Notes

- "Won't Forget This Time" interpolates "Whole Again" by Steve Aoki and Kaaze featuring John Martin.
- "Wild" samples "Born to Be Wild" by Steppenwolf.
- "Invítame A Un Café" interpolates "La Gata Bajo la Lluvia" by Rocío Dúrcal.
- "Locked Up" is a remix of "Locked Up" by Akon.
- Physical copies exclude "2 Much 2 Handle", "Muñecas", and "Mirror Mirror".
- Physical copies include an extended version of "Motor", which runs for 4:32.
- "Kids" is a remix of "Kids" by MGMT.
