= Cupido (album) =

2023 studio album by Tini

Studio album by Tini
- Released: 16 February 2023
- Recorded: 2021–2023
- Studio: 5020 (Miami, Florida); EastWest (Los Angeles); Eagle Pop (Los Angeles); Sony (Buenos Aires); Sony (Madrid)
- Genre: Latin; Argentine cumbia; urbano
- Length: 39:31
- Language: Spanish
- Label: Hollywood; Sony Latin
- Producer: Andrés Torres; Mauricio Rengifo; Richi López; Fabiana Olive; Steve Aoki; Oplus; Thebestsoundz

Tini chronology
Tini Tini Tini (2020)	Cupido (2023)	Un Mechón de Pelo (2024)

Singles from Cupido
- 1. "Miénteme" Released: 29 April 2021; 2. "Maldita Foto" Released: 19 August 2021; 3. "Bar" Released: 11 November 2021; 4. "Fantasi" Released: 17 February 2022; 5. "La Triple T" Released: 5 May 2022; 6. "Carne y Hueso" Released: 19 May 2022; 7. "La Loto" Released: 6 July 2022; 8. "El Último Beso" Released: 15 September 2022; 9. "Muñecas" Released: 12 January 2023; 10. "Cupido" Released: 14 February 2023

Cupido (Spanish pronunciation: [kuˈpiðo]; transl. Cupid) is the fourth studio album by Argentine singer Tini, released on 16 February 2023 by Hollywood Records and Sony Music Latin. Following the release of her third album Tini Tini Tini (2020), she departed from Universal Music Latino in 2021, three years after signing and releasing two albums with them. Tini then signed with Sony Music Latin shortly after, and started to begin work on the album.

A primarily cumbia and urbano record, Cupido fuses heavy influences of reggaeton with dance-pop and EDM. It features collaborations with María Becerra, Manuel Turizo, L-Gante, Beéle, Becky G, Anitta, Tiago PZK, la Joaqui and Steve Aoki. The album spawned ten singles, including three Billboard Argentina Hot 100 number-ones: "Miénteme", "Bar", and "La Triple T"; and three Billboard US Latin Pop Airplay top 25 entries: "Maldita Foto", "La Loto" and "Cupido". Aided by the album's singles, Tini attained the most top 10 hits of 2022 for any artist in Argentina.

Met with generally positive reception from music critics, Cupido was praised for Stoessel's vocal performance, its songwriting, production, and overall music aesthetic. It reached the top five in Argentina, Spain, and Uruguay. The album also peaked within the top 10 and top 50 on Billboard's US Latin Pop Albums and US Top Latin Albums charts. To support the album and its predecessor, Tini embarked on the Tini Tour, her third headlining concert tour, from May 2022 to November 2023.

== Development ==
=== Background ===
"I think that at some point in my life, Cupido as an album represents a moment in my life. The closing of a great stage, of great moments that I lived, and it's also a new beginning to my career."

—Tini, about Cupido (2023)

In 2020, Tini released her third studio album Tini Tini Tini, ending her promotion with a series of live performances in December of that same year. In 2021, Tini left her distribution contract with Universal Music Latino, and signed another distribution deal with Sony Music Latin. During the rest of 2021 and 2022, Tini released singles and songs under Sony.

During the interview with Billboard, in September 2022, she confirmed that her new album would be released soon, around the beginning of next year, and that [the album] songs tell the stories that shaped her life and career. The album's title and release date officially announced on 26 January 2023, on the Spanish program El Hormiguero, where she also pointed out that "'Cupido' is the end of a very important phase for me and spins a whole story that is part of my life and each song has a special meaning." Tini shared the cover and the release date of the tenth single "Cupido" on her Instagram. Due to popularity of the song "Las Jordans", Tini published a music video for it on 23 June 2023, as a surprise release. The music video features Tini's behind-the-scenes journey of her Tini Tour, in first half of 2023.

=== Production ===
Recording sessions on the album began in 2021 following, the release of Tini's third studio album and the interruption of her second tour due to the COVID-19 pandemic. In early 2021, Tini relocated to Miami, Florida to continue working on the album in a writing camp held by Sony Music Latin. The main part of Sessions were held at 5020 Studios in Miami and EastWest Studios in Los Angeles. Some little part of Sessions were also held in Spain and her native Argentina. Tini enlisted producers Andrés Torres, Mauricio Rengifo, and Richi López to work on the album. The first song she released as the album's lead single was "Miénteme".

== Composition ==
The album's musical direction was to pay tribute to Latin music genres. The genres featured on the album include urbano, EDM and punk rock. It also showcases heavy influences and elements of cumbia, dance-pop, Latin pop and reggaeton. Each of the songs offers a different cupid, from heartbreak to love, from love to music, family, friendships, to self-love, among others. In each of the lyrics of this album, Tini points to emotions and experiences about how to be reborn, discover and live.

== Singles ==
"Miénteme" with María Becerra was released on 29 April 2021, as the lead single from the album. It reached number 1 on the Billboard Argentina Hot 100, becoming both artists' first number-one single on AR Hot 100. The song also peaked at number sixty five on Billboard Global 200, and number forty six on Global Excl. US, making Tini the first female Argentine artists appearing on Global 200 chart.

"Maldita Foto" with Manuel Turizo was released on 19 August 2021, as the second single from the album. The song reached number ten on AR Hot 100, while it also reached number fifteen on US Billboard Latin Pop Airplay.

"Bar" with L-Gante was released on 11 November 2021, as the third album single. It reached number one at AR Hot 100, becoming Tini's second number one single on AR Hot 100 chard. The song also reached number one hundred and twenty five on Global 200.

"Fantasi" with Beéle was released on 17 February 2022, as the fourth single from the album. It reached number six at AR Hot 100.

"La Triple T" was released on 5 May 2022, as the fifth single from the album. It reached number one at AR Hot 100, becoming Tini's third number one single on AR Hot 100 chard. In the United States, the song debuted at one hundred and sixty eight on Global 200.

"Carne y Hueso" was released on 19 May 2022, as the sixth single from the album. The song reached number twelve on the AR Hot 100 chard.

"La Loto" with Becky G and Anitta was released on 6 July 2022, as the album's seventh single. It reached number seven on AR Hot 100, while also reachet at number eight on Billboard's US Latin Pop Airplay and number sixteen on the US Latin Digital Song Sales. On the Global 200 the song peaked at number one hundred and ninety seven.

"El Último Beso" with Tiago PZK was released on 15 September 2022, as the album's eighth single. Like previous single, it also reached number seven on AR Hot 100.

"Muñecas" with La Joaqui and Steve Aoki was released on 12 January 2023, as the album's ninth single. The song reached number three on AR Hot 100, while in the United States it reached number one hundred and seventeen, on Billboard Excl. US.

"Cupido" was released a few days before the album, on 14 February 2023, as the tenth and final single. It reached number 3 on the AR Hot 100, while also peaking at number sixty nine on Global 200, number thirty two on Global Excl US, and number 23 on Billboard's US Latin Pop Airplay.

== Promotion ==
To promote the single "Miénteme", Tini visited various radio stations and shows such as Los Mammones, Los 40, Cuéntamelo Ya! and Radio Disney LA. She also performed the song live at the 18th Premios Juventud awards ceremony. On 9 July 2022, Tini performed "Miénteme" alongside "La Triple T" at the 2022 MTV Millennial Awards.

In July 2022 Tini performed several songs in the Uruguayan show Rojo. In December of the same year, she held an exclusive streaming show for the Pantene company, where she performed several songs that she then released for Cupido, as well as several songs from the previous album Tini Tini Tini.

In August 2022, Tini performed "Carne y Hueso", at the 2022 Premios Gardel. The single was also performed at the 2022 Billboard Latin Music Awards. Tini also performed "Cupido" at the 2023 Billboard Latin Music Awards, that was held on 5 October 2023.

=== Tour ===
In support of the album, Tini embarked on her third solo concert tour titled Tini Tour. It was announced on 11 November 2021, the same day she released single "Bar". The tour started on 20 May 2022, at the Hipódromo de Palermo in Buenos Aires and concluded on 5 November 2023, at The Novo in Los Angeles, California. The tickets for the show went on sale the same day she confirmed the tour and were sold out in minutes, and then she added four more concerts in a row on 24, 25, 26 and 27 March 2022, at the Hipódromo, that also sold out in minutes. The tour visited cities across Latin America, Europe and North America. With this tour, Tini became the first female artist to ever sell out 6 Hipódromo de Palermo concerts, as well as the only Argentine artist to sell out a stadium in 20 years.

== Critical reception ==
Ingrid Farjado from Billboard said that "Tini is more honest and vulnerable than ever with the release of her fourth studio album, Cupido [...] beyond its musical component, Cupido serves as a personal introspection and encompasses the most profound feelings that Tini has gone through in recent years." Valentina Cardona from Fame praised Tini's ability to blend in multiple genres, stating: "In this new era of self-growth, [Tini] fuses her excellent vocal talent and song composition with urban rhythms, pop, cumbia, and electronica, all while showcasing her essence." Pip Ellwood-Hughes from Entertainment Focus pointed out that Cupido "takes listeners on a journey through love and heartbreak and it features [...] songs that showcase Tini's ability to fuse genres as well as showing off her voice."

== Commercial performance ==
Before even it was released, Cupido surpassed more than 4 billion streams globally. Just five days after its release the album entered the ranking of the ten most listened to newly released albums worldwide on top albums debut Spotify Global chart, conquering the 2nd position. Cupido also debuted at number 28 on Promusicae Spanish chart, and three days later climbed at top ten reaching the 5th position.

=== United States ===
In the United States, Cupido debuted at number 8 on US Latin Pop Albums earning 2,000 album-equivalent units in its first week of release. It become her first top 10 and first entry on Billboard albums chart. In addition, the album accumulated a total of 3 million on-demand audio streams for its songs in the tracking week. Cupido also concurrently opens at No. 45 on Top Latin Albums. With this, Tini become the first Argentinian act to debut in the top 10 on Latin Pop Albums chart since Miguel Caló's Siguen Los Exitos de La Orquesta de Miguel Calo in 2016, and first Argentinian woman to claim a top 10 debut since Soledad Pastorutti score entry with the collaborative set Raíz, with Lila Downs and Niña Pastori, in 2014. The album also debuted at number 7 on Spotify Top albums debut USA chart. Billboard reported that Cupido has scored over 157 million streams in the United States, as of September 2023. The album was certified double platinum (Latin) by the Recording Industry Association of America (RIAA) on 26 October 2023, for equivalent units of 0.12 million copies.

== Accolades ==
Awards and nominations for Cupido
Year	Ceremony	Category	Result	Ref.
2023	Premios Juventud	Best Pop/Urban Album	Nominated	
2023	Premios Tu Música Urbano	Album of the Year - Female	Nominated	
2023	Billboard Latin Music Awards	Latin Pop Album of the Year	Nominated	
2024	Lo Nuestro Awards	Urban/Pop Album of the Year	Won	
2024	Latin American Music Awards	Favorite Pop Album	Nominated	
2024	Premios Gardel	Best Urbano/Pop Album	Nominated	

== Track listing ==
Adapted via Apple Music. Credited adapted via Tidal.

Cupido track listing
No.	Title	Writer(s)	Producer(s)	Length
1.	"Cupido"	Martina Stoessel; Elena Rose; Andrés Torres; Mauricio Rengifo	Rengifo; Torres	2:54
2.	"Te Pido"	Stoessel; Rose; Rengifo; Torres	Rengifo; Torres	2:54
3.	"Muñecas" (with la Joaqui and Steve Aoki)	Stoessel; Joaquinha Lerena; Steve Aoki; Rose; Torres; Rengifo	Aoki; Oplus; Rengifo; Torres	2:36
4.	"El Último Beso" (with Tiago PZK)	Stoessel; Tiago Pacheco; Rose; Rengifo; Ricardo López; Torres	López; Rengifo; Torres	3:17
5.	"Carne y Hueso"	Stoessel; Rose; Rengifo; Torres	Rengifo; Torres	2:58
6.	"La Loto" (with Becky G and Anitta)	Stoessel; Rebbeca Gomez; Larissa de Macedo; Rose; Rengifo; Torres	Rengifo; Torres	3:10
7.	"Las Jordans"	Stoessel; Rose; Rengifo; Torres	Rengifo; Torres	2:24
8.	"Beso en las Rocas"	Stoessel; Rose; Rengifo; Torres	Rengifo; Torres	2:24
9.	"7 Veces"	Stoessel; Rose; Rengifo; Torres	Rengifo; Torres	2:54
10.	"Fantasi" (with Beéle)	Stoessel; Brandon López; Diego Vélez; Rengifo; Torres	Rengifo; Torres	2:38
11.	"Miénteme" (with María Becerra)	Stoessel; María Becerra; Rose; Enzo Sauthier; FMK; Rengifo; Torres	Rengifo; Torres	2:45
12.	"Maldita Foto" (with Manuel Turizo)	Stoessel; Manuel Turizo; Julián Turizo; Juan Medina; Rengifo; Torres	Rengifo; Torres	3:10
13.	"Bar" (with L-Gante)	Stoessel; Elián Valenzuela; Rose; Kevin Rivas; Rengifo; Torres	Rengifo; Torres	2:40
14.	"La Triple T"	Stoessel; Rose; Rengifo; Torres	Fabiana Olive; Rengifo; Torres	2:47
Total length:				39:31

== Charts ==
=== Weekly charts ===
Weekly chart performance for Cupido
Chart (2023)	Peak position
Argentine Albums (CAPIF)	3
Spanish Albums (PROMUSICAE)	5
US Latin Pop Albums (Billboard)	8
US Top Latin Albums (Billboard)	45
Uruguayan Albums (CUD)	4

=== Year-end charts ===
2023 year-end chart performance for Cupido
Chart (2023)	Position
Spanish Albums (PROMUSICAE)	20
US Latin Pop Albums (Billboard)	18

== Certifications ==
Certifications for Cupido
Region	Certification	Certified units/sales
Argentina (CAPIF)	5× Platinum	100,000^{^}
Brazil (Pro-Música Brasil)	Gold	20,000^{‡}
Colombia	3× Platinum	
Mexico (AMPROFON)	Platinum	140,000^{‡}
Spain (PROMUSICAE)	Gold	20,000^{‡}
United States (RIAA)	3× Platinum (Latin)	180,000^{‡}
^{^} Shipments figures based on certification alone.^{‡} Sales+streaming figures based on certification alone.

== Release history ==
Release history and formats for Cupido
Region	Date	Format(s)	Label	Ref.
Various	16 February 2023	CD; digital download; streaming	Hollywood; 5020; Sony Latin	
Spain	24 February 2023	CD	Hollywood; 5020; Sony Latin	
