= Cupido (Tini song) =

2023 single by Tini

- Official live performance from Futttura Tour artwork

Single by Tini

from the album Cupido
- Language: Spanish
- English title: "Cupid"
- Released: February 14, 2023
- Genre: Pop
- Length: 2:54
- Label: Hollywood; Sony Latin
- Songwriters: Martina Stoessel; Elena Rose; Andrés Torres; Mauricio Rengifo
- Producers: Rengifo; Torres

Tini singles chronology
"Por el Resto de Tu Vida" (2023)	"Cupido" (2023)	"Me Enteré" (2023)

Music video
- "Cupido" on YouTube

"Cupido" (Spanish pronunciation: [kuˈpiðo]; transl. Cupid) is a song by Argentine singer Tini. It was released on February 14, 2023, through Hollywood Records and Sony Music Latin as the tenth and last single from her fourth studio album of the same name. It was written by Tini, alongside Elena Rose, Andrés Torres and Mauricio Rengifo, and was produced by the former two. The song reached at number 3 on the Billboard Argentina Hot 100, and numbers 69 and 32 on the Billboard Global 200 and Global Excl. US. The song also reached the top 50 of the most listened to songs in the worldwide on Spotify.

== Background ==
In February 2023, Tini published through her social media the cover art, release date and title of her fourth studio album Cupido. Under the post she wrote that the entire album would be released on February 17, 2023, while the song of the same name would be released a few days before the album on February 14, 2023, as the tenth and final single. She released the first teaser of the song on February 12, 2023, hinting part of the song's lyrics, "Q nos pa so". A day before the release, she published the second teaser of the song, and revealed that the song would be released at 7pm Argentina local time. On February 15, 2023, she revealed a photoshoot for the song's music video.

== Composition ==
"Cupido" is a mid temp cumbia song with heavy dembow influences. According to the digital music sheet published at SongData.io, the song is written in the key of A major. The song is set in common time and moves through a moderate tempo, having a tempo of 120 beats per minute. Although the title of the song refers to Cupid, the God of love, the song's lyrics are not about romance, but about how Cupid's love arrow misses the right target and leads to complications in the relationship.

== Music video ==
The music video for "Cupido" was directed by Diego Peskins and was released simultaneously with the song on Tini's YouTube/VEVO channel. The music video for "Cupido" features the singer multiplied on a white stage. In the scenes, there are also seen figures with love bows and arrows, representing the Valentine's Day.

== Charts ==
=== Weekly charts ===
Weekly chart performance for "Cupido"
Chart (2023)	Peak position
Argentina Hot 100 (Billboard)	3
Argentina Airplay (Monitor Latino)	1
Bolivia Songs (Billboard)	11
Bolivia (Monitor Latino)	3
Chile Songs (Billboard)	9
Chile (Monitor Latino)	7
Costa Rica Urbano (Monitor Latino)	10
Ecuador Urbano (Monitor Latino)	13
El Salvador (Monitor Latino)	1
Global 200 (Billboard)	69
Guatemala Pop (Monitor Latino)	11
Mexico Pop (Monitor Latino)	1
Panama (PRODUCE)	37
Panama Airplay (Monitor Latino)	8
Paraguay (Monitor Latino)	13
Peru Songs (Billboard)	9
Peru Airplay (Monitor Latino)	11
Spain (Promusicae)	6
Uruguay (Monitor Latino)	6
US Latin Pop Airplay (Billboard)	23

=== Monthly charts ===
Monthly chart performance for "Cupido"
Chart (2023)	Peak position
Paraguay (SPG)	29
Uruguay (CUD)	6

=== Year-end charts ===
Year-end chart performance for "Cupido"
Chart (2023)	Position
Global Excl. US (Billboard)	192
Spain (PROMUSICAE)	23

== Certifications ==
Certifications for "Cupido"
Region	Certification	Certified units/sales
Colombia	Gold	
Mexico (AMPROFON)	Platinum	140,000^{‡}
Spain (Promusicae)	5× Platinum	300,000^{‡}
United States (RIAA)	4× Platinum (Latin)	240,000^{‡}
^{‡} Sales+streaming figures based on certification alone.
