= List of Billboard Argentina Hot 100 number-one singles of 2022 =

The Billboard Argentina Hot 100 is a chart that ranks the best-performing songs in the Argentina. Its data, published by Billboard Argentina and Billboard magazines and compiled by Nielsen SoundScan and BMAT/Vericast, is based collectively on each song's weekly physical and digital sales, as well as the amount of airplay received on Argentine radio stations and TV and streaming on online digital music outlets.

== Chart history ==
No.	Issue date	Song	Artist(s)	Ref.
32	January 2	"Bar"	Tini and L-Gante	
32	January 9	"Bar"	Tini and L-Gante	
re	January 16	"Entre Nosotros (Remix)"	Tiago PZK, Lit Killah, María Becerra and Nicki Nicole	
re	January 23	"Entre Nosotros (Remix)"	Tiago PZK, Lit Killah, María Becerra and Nicki Nicole	
re	January 30	"Entre Nosotros (Remix)"	Tiago PZK, Lit Killah, María Becerra and Nicki Nicole	
re	February 6	"Entre Nosotros (Remix)"	Tiago PZK, Lit Killah, María Becerra and Nicki Nicole	
re	February 13	"Entre Nosotros (Remix)"	Tiago PZK, Lit Killah, María Becerra and Nicki Nicole	
re	February 20	"Entre Nosotros (Remix)"	Tiago PZK, Lit Killah, María Becerra and Nicki Nicole	
re	February 27	"Entre Nosotros (Remix)"	Tiago PZK, Lit Killah, María Becerra and Nicki Nicole	
re	March 6	"Entre Nosotros (Remix)"	Tiago PZK, Lit Killah, María Becerra and Nicki Nicole	
33	March 13	"Residente: Bzrp Music Sessions, Vol. 49"	Bizarrap and Residente	
re	March 20	"Entre Nosotros (Remix)"	Tiago PZK, Lit Killah, María Becerra and Nicki Nicole	
34	March 27	"Universo Paralelo"	La K'onga and Nahuel Pennisi	
35	April 3	"Plan A"	Paulo Londra	
35	April 10	"Plan A"	Paulo Londra	
35	April 17	"Plan A"	Paulo Londra	
35	April 24	"Plan A"	Paulo Londra	
35	May 1	"Plan A"	Paulo Londra	
36	May 8	"Paulo Londra: Bzrp Music Sessions, Vol. 23"	Bizarrap and Paulo Londra	
36	May 15	"Paulo Londra: Bzrp Music Sessions, Vol. 23"	Bizarrap and Paulo Londra	
37	May 22	"La Triple T"	Tini	
37	May 29	"La Triple T"	Tini	
37	June 5	"La Triple T"	Tini	
37	June 12	"La Triple T"	Tini	
37	June 19	"La Triple T"	Tini	
38	June 26	"Te Felicito"	Shakira and Rauw Alejandro	
38	July 3	"Te Felicito"	Shakira and Rauw Alejandro	
38	July 10	"Te Felicito"	Shakira and Rauw Alejandro	
38	July 17	"Te Felicito"	Shakira and Rauw Alejandro	
39	July 24	"Quevedo: Bzrp Music Sessions, Vol. 52"	Bizarrap and Quevedo	
39	July 31	"Quevedo: Bzrp Music Sessions, Vol. 52"	Bizarrap and Quevedo	
39	August 7	"Quevedo: Bzrp Music Sessions, Vol. 52"	Bizarrap and Quevedo	
39	August 14	"Quevedo: Bzrp Music Sessions, Vol. 52"	Bizarrap and Quevedo	
39	August 21	"Quevedo: Bzrp Music Sessions, Vol. 52"	Bizarrap and Quevedo	
39	August 28	"Quevedo: Bzrp Music Sessions, Vol. 52"	Bizarrap and Quevedo	
39	September 4	"Quevedo: Bzrp Music Sessions, Vol. 52"	Bizarrap and Quevedo	
39	September 11	"Quevedo: Bzrp Music Sessions, Vol. 52"	Bizarrap and Quevedo	
40	September 18	"La Bachata"	Manuel Turizo	
40	September 25	"La Bachata"	Manuel Turizo	
40	October 2	"La Bachata"	Manuel Turizo	
40	October 9	"La Bachata"	Manuel Turizo	
40	October 16	"La Bachata"	Manuel Turizo	
40	October 23	"La Bachata"	Manuel Turizo	
40	October 30	"La Bachata"	Manuel Turizo	
40	November 6	"La Bachata"	Manuel Turizo	
40	November 13	"La Bachata"	Manuel Turizo	
40	November 20	"La Bachata"	Manuel Turizo	
40	November 27	"La Bachata"	Manuel Turizo	
41	December 4	"Duki: Bzrp Music Sessions, Vol. 50"	Bizarrap and Duki	
re	December 11	"La Bachata"	Manuel Turizo	
re	December 18	"La Bachata"	Manuel Turizo	
re	December 25	"La Bachata"	Manuel Turizo	

== See also ==
- List of Billboard Argentina Hot 100 top-ten singles in 2022
