= El Último Beso (Tini song) =

2022 single by Tini featuring Tiago PZK

Single by Tini and Tiago PZK

from the album Cupido
- Language: Spanish
- English title: "The Last Kiss"
- Released: September 15, 2022
- Genre: Urban-pop; punk rock
- Length: 3:17
- Label: Hollywood; Sony Latin
- Songwriters: Martina Stoessel; Tiago PZK; Andrés Torres; Mauricio Rengifo; Elena Rose; Duki; Richi López
- Producers: Torres; Rengifo; López

Tini singles chronology
"La Loto" (2022)	"El Último Beso" (2022)	"La Ducha (Remix)" (2022)

Tiago PZK singles chronology
"Sex & Love" (2022)	"El Último Beso" (2022)	"Hood (Remix)" (2022)

Music video
- "El Último Beso" on YouTube

"El Último Beso" (transl. "The Last Kiss") is a song by Argentine singer Tini and Argentine rapper Tiago PZK. It was released on September 15, 2022, through Hollywood Records and Sony Music Latin as the eight single from Tini's fourth studio album, Cupido (2023). The song was written by two singers alongside Elena Rose, Duki and its producers Richi López, Andrés Torres and Mauricio Rengifo.

== Background and release ==
Tini announced the song at the end of July 2022 through her social networks, and added that she is very excited about this collaboration and can't wait for people to hear this song and watch the music video. Later, both singers published some behind-the-scenes pictures of a video clip via their Instagram stories. Tigao PZK also told that "It was leaked. There’s something Tini coming up with”, a few days before the song came out.

During an interwiev Tini shared: “I love his talent from the first time I heard it, I always wanted to share music with him, so I'm very happy that the time has come and you can finally listen to this song that we have saved for so long. I hope you enjoy it a lot and The day will come soon when we can meet at a show and sing it." Speaking abouth his part Tiago PZK said: “It's a pleasure to make a song with one of the most professional and well-dressed women in my country, the song is from the heart and has a very real message about ties."

== Composition ==
"El Último Beso" is a primary urban-pop song with punk rock influences. The song was written by Tini, Tiago PKZ alongside Elena Rose, Duki, Richi López, Andrés Torres and Mauricio Rengifo, while the later three also produced the song. It lasts for a duration of three minutes and seventeen seconds. The song is written in the key of B♭ major, with a moderately fast tempo of 113 beats per minute.

== Music video ==
The music video was released alongside the song on Tini's YouTube channel. It was directed by Argentine director Diego Peskins. The music video follows the two as they play a couple whose relationship is on the brink of failure. The video begins with the two together with montages of them getting tattoos. The relationship develops throughout the video as the artists bring the lyrics to life with emotionally moving renditions.

== Charts ==
Chart performance for "El Último Beso"
Chart (2022)	Peak position
Argentina Hot 100 (Billboard)	7
Argentina Airplay (Monitor Latino)	7
Paraguay (Monitor Latino)	11
Uruguay (Monitor Latino)	2

== Certifications ==
Region	Certification	Certified units/sales
Argentina (CAPIF)	Platinum	20,000^{‡}
^{‡} Sales+streaming figures based on certification alone.
