= Elena Rose =

American singer (born 1995)

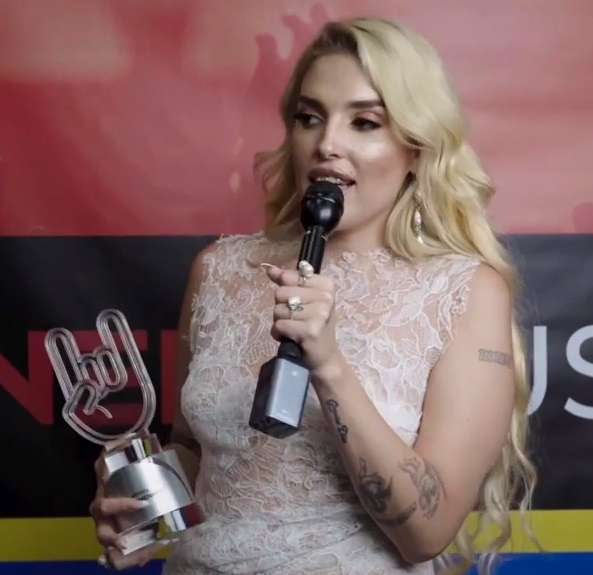
- Elena Rose at Premios Tu Música Urbano (2023)

Background information
- Born: Andrea Elena Mangiamarchi; March 23, 1995 (age 31); Miami, Florida, U.S.
- Genres: Latin pop; urban contemporary
- Occupations: Singer; songwriter
- Instrument: Vocals
- Years active: 2018–present
- Label: Warner Music Latina

Andrea Elena Mangiamarchi, known by her stage name Elena Rose (stylised in all caps), is an American singer and songwriter.

As a collaborator, Rose is perhaps best known for working with American singer Becky G, notably on songs such as "Dollar" (with Myke Towers), "Muchacha" (with Gente de Zona), "No Drama" (with Ozuna), and "Mamiii" (with Karol G). As a songwriter, Rose's credits include numerous collaborations with many international artists, including with Alejandro Sanz, Anitta, Christina Aguilera, CNCO, Emilia Mernes, Jennifer Lopez, Lali, Ludmilla, Luísa Sonza, Maluma, Marc Anthony, María Becerra, Natti Natasha, Piso 21, Rauw Alejandro, Shakira and Tini, among others.

In 2020, Rose released her debut single, "Sandunga".

== Biography ==
Elena Rose was born in Miami to Venezuelan parents. She spent most of her childhood between Puerto Rico and Venezuela, where she studied journalism. Rose has a wide range of musical influences and roots, from Frank Sinatra to Daddy Yankee. She moved to the United States, permanently, when she was 19. Rose's singing career began as she performed in local bars; the first high-caliber artist that Rose worked with was globally famous Puerto Rican singer Ricky Martin. Her breakthrough song was "Dollar", a single released by Mexican American singer Becky G and Puerto Rican artists Myke Towers (2019), leading to her rise in popularity within the industry as a songwriter. Since then, Rose has worked with many prominent English- and Spanish-language artists, such as Rauw Alejandro, Selena Gomez, Tini, Maluma and CNCO, and co-wrote singles for musicians such as reggaetonero Noriel, Chilean-American artist Paloma Mami and Argentine singer Emilia Mernes.

In May 2020, Rose released her debut single, "Sandunga", a reggaeton-pop song written by and co-produced by Rose herself, along with production team The Honeyboos. She released a follow-up track, "Fenomenal", later in the same month, which she co-wrote, Peruvian producer Patrick Romantik and Bad Bunny songwriter Brasa.

== Discography ==
=== Studio album ===
- Bendito Verano (2025)

=== Extended play ===
- En Las Nubes - Con Mis Panas (2024)
- No Quiero Que Se Acabe Este Bendito Verano (2026)

=== Singles ===
List of singles, showing year released and album name
| Title | Year | Album |
|---|---|---|
| "Sandunga" | 2020 | Non-album singles |
| "Fenomenal" | 2020 | Non-album singles |
| "La Ducha" | 2020 | Non-album singles |
| "Coco" | 2020 | Non-album singles |
| "No Voy A Cambiar" | 2020 | Non-album singles |
| "Santa Para Que Porfa" | 2020 | Non-album singles |
| "Pimienta" | 2021 | Non-album singles |
| "Picachu" | 2021 | Non-album singles |
| "Vogue" | 2021 | Non-album singles |
| "La Partiste Con Tu Regalo" | 2021 | Non-album singles |
| "La Ducha (Remix)" (with Greeicy and María Becerra featuring Becky G and Tini) | 2022 | Non-album singles |
| "Bayamón" | 2022 | Non-album singles |
| "Navida" (with Bebo Dumont) | 2022 | Non-album singles |
| "El Hombre" | 2023 | Non-album singles |
| "Disculpa Amiga" | 2023 | Non-album singles |
| "Limonadita Fresca" (with DJ Maff) | 2023 | Non-album singles |
| "Linda Natural" | 2023 | Non-album singles |
| "Caracas en el 2000" (with Danny Ocean and Jerry Di) | 2023 | Non-album singles |
| "Blanco y Negro" (with Lagos) | 2024 | Alta Fidelidad |
| "Me Lo Merezco" | 2024 | En Las Nubes - Con Mis Panas |
| "Caracas en el 2000 (Remix)" (with Servando & Florentino and Rawayana) | 2024 | Non-album singles |
| "Trago al Pecho" | 2024 | Non-album singles |
| "Orión" (with Boza) | 2024 | San Blas |
| "Maldades" (with PJ Sin Suela) | 2024 | Toda Época Tiene Su Encanto |
| "Catira" (with Neutro Shorty) | 2024 | En Las Nubes - Con Mis Panas |
| "A Las 12 Te Olvidé" (with Ha*Ash) | 2024 | HaAshVille |
| "Pa' Qué Volviste?" (with María Becerra) | 2024 | Non-album singles |
| "Un Beso Menos" (with Morat) | 2025 | Non-album singles |
| "Instinto" (with Lil Supa) | 2025 | Non-album singles |
| "Carteras Chinas" (with Camilo and Los Ángeles Azules) | 2025 | Non-album singles |
| "Sintigo" (with Sistek and Mazzarri) | 2025 | Bendito Verano |
| "Cosita Linda" (with Justin Quiles) | 2025 | Bendito Verano |

=== Guest appearances ===
| Title | Year | Other artists | Album |
|---|---|---|---|
| "Somewhere in the Hills" | 2018 | Ricardo Bacelar | Sebastiana |
| "Quererte Bonito" | 2022 | Sebastián Yatra | Dharma |
| "Playa Privada" | 2022 | Mora | Microdosis |
| "Flashback" | 2022 | Becky G | Esquemas |
| "Las estrellas/Si tu me love me" | 2022 | Danny Ocean | @dannocean 2 |
| "Consciencia" | 2023 | Rawayana | Quién trae las cornetas? |
| "No quiero pelear" | 2024 | Young Miko | Att. |
| "Free" | 2024 | Manal | Arabian Heartbreak |
| "1-0" | 2024 | Sech | Tranki, Todo Pasa |
| "Engreído" | 2025 | Cazzu | Latinaje |
| "Me Das Fever" | 2025 | Sergio George, Oscar D'León, Skip Marley | Ataca Sergio! Presents: Urban Salsa Sessions! |
| "Agua" | 2025 | Mau y Ricky | La Llave |

== Songwriting credits ==
| Song | Year | Artist(s) | Album |
|---|---|---|---|
| "Tu Canción" | 2019 | MYA | Hoy |
| "Dollar" | 2019 | Becky G, Myke Towers | Mala Santa |
| "Ya Quisieran" | 2019 | j mena | Non-album single |
| "La Ley" | 2019 | CNCO | Que Quiénes Somos |
| "Mejor Así" | 2019 | Becky G, Darell | Mala Santa |
| "Exclusivos" | 2019 | Periko & Jessi León | Non-album single |
| "Piropo" | 2019 | Noriel | Cerrando Capitulo |
| "Feeling Temporal" | 2019 | Peche | Feeling Temporal |
| "Mami" | 2019 | Paloma Mami | Sueños de Dalí |
| "Policía" | 2020 | Emilia | Non-album singles |
| "Tattoo" | 2020 | Rauw Alejandro | Non-album singles |
| "Party en mi Casa" | 2020 | Boza | Sonrisas Tristes |
| "Boys Ain't Shit" (Estos Chicos No Lo Son remix) | 2020 | Saygrace, Becky G | Boys Ain't Shit |
| "Dumebi" (Becky G remix) | 2020 | Rema, Matoma, Becky G | Non-album single |
| "No vuelvas a mirar atrás" | 2020 | Alaina Castillo | Mensajes de voz |
| "Funk Total: Vai Danada" | 2020 | Pk, Becky G, Gabily | Non-album single |
| "Muchacha" | 2020 | Gente de Zona, Becky G | De Menor a Mayor |
| "My Man" | 2020 | Becky G | Non-album singles |
| "Otro Día Lluvioso" | 2020 | Juhn, Lenny Tavárez, Becky G, Dalex | Non-album singles |
| "Pa' Ti" | 2020 | Jennifer Lopez, Maluma | Marry Me Original Motion Picture Soundtrack |
| "Trío" | 2020 | Nathy Peluso | Calambre |
| "Que Lo Que" | 2020 | Major Lazer, Paloma Mami | Music Is the Weapon |
| "Sucio y Lento" | 2020 | Mariah Angeliq, Lele Pons | Non-album singles |
| "No Drama" | 2020 | Becky G, Ozuna | Non-album singles |
| "Tango" | 2020 | Alaya | Alaya |
| "Ayer Me Llamó Mi Ex" (remix) | 2020 | Khea, Natti Natasha, Prince Royce | Non-album singles |
| "Esta Noche" | 2020 | FMK, Emilia, Estani, Big One | Non-album singles |
| "Enredaos" | 2020 | Lali | Libra |
| "Fue Mejor" | 2020 | Kali Uchis | Sin Miedo (del Amor y Otros Demonios) |
| "De Vuelta Pa' La Vuelta" | 2020 | Daddy Yankee, Marc Anthony | Non-album singles |
| "Qué Maldición" (remix) | 2020 | Banda MS, Snoop Dogg, Becky G | Non-album singles |
| "De Una Vez" | 2021 | Selena Gomez | Revelación |
| "Baila Conmigo" | 2021 | Selena Gomez, Rauw Alejandro | Revelación |
| "Religiosa" | 2021 | Paloma Mami | Sueños de Dalí |
| "Rotate" | 2021 | Becky G, Burna Boy | Non-album single |
| "Te Va Bien" | 2021 | Kevvo, Arcángel, Becky G, Darell | Cotidiano |
| "Buscando Amor" | 2021 | Selena Gomez | Revelación |
| "Dámelo To'" | 2021 | Selena Gomez, Myke Towers | Revelación |
| "Vicio" | 2021 | Selena Gomez | Revelación |
| "Feeling" | 2021 | Dalex | Unisex |
| "Luna" | 2021 | Cami | Non-album single |
| "Ram Pam Pam" | 2021 | Natti Natasha, Becky G | Nattividad and Esquemas |
| "Sorpresa" | 2021 | Lenny Tavárez | Krack |
| "Miénteme" | 2021 | Tini, María Becerra | Cupido |
| "Le Gusta Que La Vean" | 2021 | Lunay | El Niño |
| "Mojito" | 2021 | Thalía | Desamorfosis |
| "Al Lau" | 2021 | Lele Pons | Non-album single |
| "Sal y Perrea" | 2021 | Sech | 42 |
| "Best Life" | 2021 | Lunay | El Niño |
| "Fulanito" | 2021 | Becky G, El Alfa | Esquemas |
| "Only One" | 2021 | Khea, Julia Michaels, Becky G, Di Genius | Non-album single |
| "Maldita Foto" | 2021 | Tini, Manuel Turizo | Cupido |
| "Mal de Amores" | 2021 | Sofía Reyes, Becky G | Mal de Amores |
| "Tarde" | 2021 | Sebastián Yatra | Dharma |
| "Free Hugs" | 2021 | Angel22 | Non-album single |
| "Imposible Amor" | 2021 | Natti Natasha, Maluma | Nattividad |
| "La Sinvergüenza" | 2021 | Christian Nodal, Banda MS | Forajido EP 1 |
| "Bar" | 2021 | Tini, L-Gante | Cupido |
| "Another day in America" | 2021 | Kali Uchis, Ozuna | Non-album singles |
| "Tu Debilidad" | 2021 | Mati Gómez, Emilia | Non-album singles |
| "Gadejo" | 2022 | Angel22 | Non-album singles |
| "Quererte bonito" | 2022 | Sebastián Yatra, Elena Rose | Dharma |
| "Istanbul" | 2022 | Danny Ocean | @dannocean |
| "Mamiii" | 2022 | Becky G, Karol G | Esquemas |
| "Fantasi" | 2022 | Tini, Beéle | Cupido |
| "Yo Le Mentí" | 2022 | Marc Anthony | Pa'llá Voy |
| "El Peor" | 2022 | Cami | Non-album singles |
| "Ya Acabó" | 2022 | Marca MP, Becky G | Non-album singles |
| "Carne y Hueso" | 2022 | Tini | Cupido |
| "La Triple T" | 2022 | Tini | Cupido |
| "Party" | 2022 | Bad Bunny, Rauw Alejandro | Un Verano Sin Ti |
| "Tajin" | 2022 | Becky G, Guaynaa | Esquemas |
| "Flashback" | 2022 | Becky G, Elena Rose | Esquemas |
| "Dolores" | 2022 | Becky G | Esquemas |
| "Borracha" | 2022 | Becky G | Esquemas |
| "Kill Bill" | 2022 | Becky G | Esquemas |
| "Que le Muerda" | 2022 | Becky G | Esquemas |
| "Guapa" | 2022 | Becky G | Esquemas |
| "El Karma" | 2022 | Christian Nodal | Forajido EP 1 |
| "Limón Con Sal" | 2022 | Christian Nodal | Forajido EP 1 |
| "La Balada" | 2022 | Emilia | tú crees en mí? |
| "Mi Otra Mitad" | 2022 | Emilia | tú crees en mí? |
| "Te Deseo lo Mejor" | 2022 | Christina Aguilera | Aguilera |
| "Te Amo y Punto" | 2022 | Chayanne | Non-album singles |
| "LaLaLa" | 2022 | Angel22 | Non-album singles |
| "La Loto" | 2022 | Tini, Becky G, Anitta | Cupido |
| "5 Estrellas" | 2022 | Reik, Sech | Non-album single |
| "La Duda" | 2022 | CNCO | XOXO |
| "El Último Beso" | 2022 | Tini, Tiago PZK | Cupido |
| "Para Ti No" | 2022 | Angel22 | Non-album singles |
| "Victory" | 2022 | Mar Mejía | Non-album singles |
| "Underground" | 2022 | Emilia | Non-album single |
| "Muñecas" | 2023 | Tini, la Joaqui, Steve Aoki | Cupido |
| "La Gira" | 2023 | FMK, Reik | Non-album singles |
| "Por el Resto de Tu Vida" | 2023 | Christian Nodal, Tini | Non-album singles |
| "Cupido" | 2023 | Tini | Cupido |
| "Te Pido" | 2023 | Tini | Cupido |
| "Las Jordans" | 2023 | Tini | Cupido |
| "Beso En Las Rocas" | 2023 | Tini | Cupido |
| "Arranca" | 2023 | Becky G, Omega | Non-album singles |
| "1Trago" | 2023 | Danna Paola | Non-album singles |
| "People (Remix)" | 2023 | Libianca, Becky G | Non-album singles |
| "I Ain't Worried (Latin Version)" | 2023 | OneRepublic, Becky G | Non-album singles |
| "Como Yo :(" | 2023 | Marshmello, Tiago PZK | Non-album singles |
| "Cuídala" | 2023 | Grupo Frontera | El Comienzo |
| "Soy Tu Papá" | 2023 | Rawayana, Spreadlof, Fernando Palomo | ¿Quién Trae Las Cornetas? |
| "Nada Malo" | 2023 | Rawayana, Bebo Dumont | ¿Quién Trae Las Cornetas? |
| "Brindo" | 2023 | Rawayana | ¿Quién Trae Las Cornetas? |
| "Parece" | 2023 | Rawayana | ¿Quién Trae Las Cornetas? |
| "Consciencia" | 2023 | Rawayana, Elena Rose | ¿Quién Trae Las Cornetas? |
| "Cabarete" | 2023 | Rawayana, Xhess | ¿Quién Trae Las Cornetas? |
| "Cries in Spanish" | 2023 | Becky G, DannyLux | Esquinas |
| "Bien Canijo" | 2023 | Becky G | Esquinas |
| "Patras" | 2023 | Becky G, Yahritza y su Esencia | Esquinas |
| "Por el Contrario" | 2023 | Becky G, Ángela Aguilar, Leonardo Aguilar | Esquinas |
| "Vallenato" | 2023 | Piso 21, Elena Rose | Non-album singles |
| "La Muerte" | 2023 | Luísa Sonza, Tokischa | Non-album singles |
| "Amigos" | 2023 | Bibi, Becky G | Non-album singles |
| "RDC" | 2023 | Myke Towers | LVEU: Viva la Tuya...No la Mía |
| "Te Conozco" | 2023 | Myke Towers | LVEU: Viva la Tuya...No la Mía |
| "Nada Que Decir" | 2024 | Blessd | Si Sabe |
| "The One (Pero No Como Yo)" | 2024 | Carín León, Kane Brown | Non-album single |
| "Tiempo Sin Verte" | 2024 | Shakira | Las Mujeres Ya No Lloran |
| "Favorite" | 2024 | Isabel LaRosa | Raven |
| "Pa" | 2024 | Tini | Un Mechón de Pelo |
| "Piña Colada" | 2024 | Ludmilla, Ryan Castro | Non-album single |
| "Otro Capítulo" | 2024 | Becky G | Encuentros |

== Awards and nominations ==
| Award | Year | Recipient(s) and nominee(s) | Category | Result | Ref. |
|---|---|---|---|---|---|
| BMI Latin Awards | 2023 | "Baila Conmigo" | Winning Songs (Note: Awards and nominations Rose has received as songwriter.) | Won | |
| BMI Latin Awards | 2023 | "De Vuelta Pa' La Vuelta" | Winning Songs | Won | |
| BMI Latin Awards | 2023 | "La Sinvergüenza" | Winning Songs | Won | |
| BMI Latin Awards | 2023 | "Mamiii" | Winning Songs | Won | |
| Heat Latin Music Awards | 2023 | Elena Rose | Musical Promise | Nominated | |
| Latin Grammy Awards | 2020 | "Muchacha" | Best Urban Song | Nominated | |
| Latin Grammy Awards | 2022 | Aguilera (Note: For her work as the songwriter on "Te Deseo lo Mejor".) | Album of the Year | Nominated | |
| Latin Grammy Awards | 2022 | Pa'llá Voy (Note: For her work as the songwriter on "Yo Le Mentí".) | Album of the Year | Nominated | |
| Latin Grammy Awards | 2022 | Un Verano Sin Ti (Note: For her work as the songwriter on "Party".) | Album of the Year | Nominated | |
| Latin Grammy Awards | 2022 | Dharma (Note: For her work as the songwriter on "Quererte Bonito" and "Tarde".) | Album of the Year | Nominated | |
| Latin Grammy Awards | 2022 | "Mamiii" | Best Urban Song | Nominated | |
| Latin Grammy Awards | 2023 | Elena Rose | Songwriter of the Year | Nominated | |
| Latin Grammy Awards | 2024 | "Por el Contrario" | Best Regional Mexican Song | Nominated | |
| Latin Grammy Awards | 2024 | "Blanco y Negro" | Best Pop/Rock Song | Nominated | |
| Latin Grammy Awards | 2024 | "Caracas en el 2000" | Song of the Year | Nominated | |
| Latin Grammy Awards | 2025 | En las Nubes - Con Mis Panas | Album of the Year | Pending | |
| Latin Grammy Awards | 2025 | En las Nubes - Con Mis Panas | Best Contemporary Pop Album | Pending | |
| Latin Grammy Awards | 2025 | "Palmeras en el Jardín" | Song of the Year | Pending | |
| Latin Grammy Awards | 2025 | "Orión" (Sistek Remix) | Best Latin Electronic Music Performance | Pending | |
| Lo Nuestro Awards | 2022 | Elena Rose | New Artist – Female | Nominated | |
| Lo Nuestro Awards | 2023 | Elena Rose | Female Urban Artist of the Year | Nominated | |
| Lo Nuestro Awards | 2023 | "La Ducha (Remix)" | Remix of the Year | Nominated | |
| La Musa Awards | 2022 | Elena Rose | La Musa Elena Casals Award | Won | |
| Premios Tu Música Urbano | 2022 | Elena Rose | Composer of the Year | Nominated | |
| Premios Tu Música Urbano | 2023 | Elena Rose | Top New Artist — Female | Won | |
