= Muñecas (song) =

2023 single by Tini, la Joaqui and Steve Aoki

Single by Tini, La Joaqui and Steve Aoki

from the album Cupido and Hiroquest 2: Double Helix
- Language: Spanish
- Released: 12 January 2023
- Recorded: 2022
- Genre: Cumbia; electro house
- Length: 2:36
- Label: Hollywood; 5020
- Songwriters: Martina Stoessel; Steve Aoki; Joaquinha Lerena de la Riva; Andrés Torres; Mauricio Rengifo; Osmar Escobar; Elena Rose; Rafael Rodríguez; Steve Salazar; David Orea; Juan José Arias; Santiago Naranjo Lopez; Juan David Correa Cardona; Donny Flores
- Producers: Aoki; Thebestsoundz; Torres; Rengifo; Oplus

Tini singles chronology
"La Ducha (Remix)" (2022)	"Muñecas" (2023)	"Por el Resto de Tu Vida" (2023)

La Joaqui singles chronology
"¿Y Pa la Wacha Loca? (Remix)" (2023)	"Muñecas" (2023)	"Algo Anda Mal #5" (2023)

Steve Aoki singles chronology
"New York" (2023)	"Muñecas" (2023)	"The White Lotus Theme (Aloha)" (2023)

Music video
- "Munecas" on YouTube

"Muñecas" (English: "Dolls") is a song by Argentine singer Tini, Argentine rapper La Joaqui, and American music producer Steve Aoki. The song was released on 12 January 2023, through Hollywood Records and 5020 Records as the ninth single from Tini's fourth studio album, Cupido (2023). It is also included on Aoki's eighth studio album Hiroquest 2: Double Helix (2023), serving as the second single from that album.

== Background and release ==
On 29 December 2022, Tini posted on her Instagram reel, a video with a snippet of the song, revealing the name and how it is a collaboration with Joaqui and Aoki. On 9 January 2023, she shared some pictures from the shoot and revealed how the song is coming out on 12 January 2023. A few days before the song's release, Tini shared a #MuñecasChallenge, which quickly went viral on the video sharing platform TikTok. In interview with Rolling Stone, Tini shared that Aoki sent her the song during the pandemic and they decided to save it. Once the track was finalized, she thought her compatriot La Joaqui would be the best person to sing the track with. She also added: “Ever since I heard ‘Muñecas’ for the first time, I always imagined singing it next to a woman. I started listening to music by La Joaqui and instantly thought of her for it.” [...] “She is a woman with so much strength and values, a great artist and person. I hope life unites us many more times for collaborations.” Aoki also spoke up about the collaboration, saying: “It was a great experience working with Tini and La Joaqui because we were able to merge our individual musical styles, and come together for this track.”

== Composition ==
The lyrics fort the song were written by the three singers, alongside Andrés Torres, Mauricio Rengifo, Osmar Escobar, Elena Rose, Rafael Rodríguez, Steve Salazar, David Orea, Juan José Arias, Santiago Naranjo Lopez, Juan David Correa Cardona and Donny Flores, while Aoki, Torres and Rengifo, also served as producers of the song along with The Best Soundz. Musically, the song blended the cumbia beats that Tini is known for with an electronic edge. Aoki also describes “Muñecas” as a song “bursting with flavor and rhythm, mixing tradition with innovation.” The lyrics contain references how girls living their best lives on the dance floor, while also doubles as a fierce club banger and a girl power anthem. The song lasts for a duration of two minutes thirty-six seconds. It is written in the key of A Minor, with a moderately fast tempo of 150 beats per minute.

== Music video ==
The video for "Muñecas" was directed by Tini's long-time collaborator Diego Peskins. In the music video, Tini and la Joaqui are shown living inside a lavish dollhouse, singing from inside different rooms and dancing sensually. Aoki makes a brief appearance.

== Credits and personnel ==
Adapted from Tidal.

- Tini – lead vocals, songwriting
- Steve Aoki – co-lead vocals, songwriting, production
- La Joaqui – co-lead vocals, songwriting
- Andrés Torres – songwriting, production, programming, instruments, engineering
- Mauricio Rengifo – songwriting, production, programming, instruments, engineering
- Osmar Escobar – songwriting
- Elena Rose – songwriting
- Rafael Rodríguez – songwriting
- Steve Salazar – songwriting
- David Orea – songwriting
- Juan José Arias – production, programming, instruments
- Santiago Naranjo Lopez – production, programming, instruments
- Juan David Correa Cardona – songwriting
- Donny Flores – songwriting
- Oplus – production, programming
- Dani Val – engineering
- Luigi Navarro – engineering
- The Elephant – engineering, mixing

== Charts ==
Chart performance for "Muñecas"
Chart (2023)	Peak position
Argentina Hot 100 (Billboard)	3
Argentina (Monitor Latino)	5
Argentina Latin Airplay (Monitor Latino)	4
Argentina National Songs (Monitor Latino)	2
Bolivia (Billboard)	25
Bolivia (Monitor Latino)	14
Global Excl. US (Billboard)	117
Spain (PROMUSICAE)	41
Uruguay (Monitor Latino)	6

=== Monthly charts ===
Monthly chart performance for "Muñecas"
Chart (2022)	Peak position
Paraguay (SGP)	44
Uruguay (CUDISCO)	11

== Certifications ==
Region	Certification	Certified units/sales
Spain (Promusicae)	Platinum	60,000^{‡}
^{‡} Sales+streaming figures based on certification alone.
