= Miénteme =

2021 single by Tini featuring María Becerra

Single by Tini and María Becerra

from the album Cupido
- Language: Spanish
- English title: "Lie to Me"
- Released: April 29, 2021
- Studio: Miami, Florida; Los Angeles, California
- Genre: Cumbia; reggaeton
- Length: 2:45
- Label: Hollywood; Sony Latin
- Songwriters: Martina Stoessel; María Becerra; Elena Rose; Enzo Ezequiel Sauthier; FMK; Andrés Torres; Mauricio Rengifo
- Producers: Rengifo; Torres

Tini singles chronology
"Playa" (2021)	"Miénteme" (2021)	"2:50 (Remix)" (2021)

María Becerra singles chronology
"Si Yo Fuera Tú" (2021)	"Miénteme" (2021)	"Te Necesito" (2021)

Music video
- "Miénteme" on YouTube

"Miénteme" (Spanish pronunciation: [ˈmjenteme]; transl. "Lie to Me") is a song by Argentine singers Tini and María Becerra. It was released on April 29, 2021, through Hollywood Records and Sony Music Latin as the lead single from Tini's fourth studio album, Cupido (2023). The song was written by two singers alongside FMK, Enzo Ezequiel Sauthier, Elena Rose, Andrés Torres and Mauricio Rengifo, and was produced by the latter two. It is Tini's and Becerra's second collaboration, following the "High" remix, released in September 2020.

The song reached number one on the Billboard Argentina Hot 100, becoming both artists first number-one single on Argentina. The song also has reached number one in Uruguay and Costa Rica, as well as the top five in Spain and various Hispanic American countries. The song was a hit since its release and, in June, it reached the top 50 of the most listened to songs in the world on Spotify, making Tini and Becerra the first Argentine artists to ever achieve such success. The song also peaked on Billboard Global 200, and Global Excl. US, making Tini and Beccera the first female Argentine artists appearing on Global 200 chart.

== Background ==
After their successful first collaboration "High Remix", Tini announced that she was preparing a new song with Becerra, and also, in interview for Vanity Teen magazine she revealed: "With Mary [Becerra], we did High, alongside Lola Índigo, and people felt really connected to that single. [...] And, when we introduced this song, I had been in silence for six months. I had not released a song or anything during that time. Thus, I said that I wanted to release a new song with her after the success of High and all the love we received for that song we had sung together".

Speaking on her part on "Miénteme" during an interview with Los 40, Becerra said: "Tini and I have collaborated together before. We love to record songs, plan when to release them, and ‘Mienteme’ was one of them. Tini said ‘look, I have a song that I would like you to be part of, I see you, only you, I want to get it as close to my birthday as possible, it would be a gift for me.’ For reasons that were out of our hands, we could not get it out for her birthday (March 21). But when she sent me the song, I immediately recorded my part and she loved it. [...] It was super long to shoot. It has a lot of choreography, a lot of setups, dancers, everything. An incredible production. You can see in the result the effort that we put into it".

On April 24, the singers shared the first teaser of the new single on their social networks, and revealed that it will be released on April 29. Later, two more teasers followed, then the complete teaser was posted on Tini's official YouTube channel, and it reached number one in the YouTube trends in Argentina and several Latin American countries. After a few hours the song was released, it became a trend reaching the first position in several countries, and Tini launched the #MiéntemeChallenge that went viral on the video-sharing platform TikTok. Tini also revealed during a Billboard Live interview that the "Mienteme Remix" will come."

== Composition ==
"Miénteme" was written by Tini, Becerra, FMK, Enzo Ezequiel Sauthier, Elena Rose, Andrés Torres and Mauricio Rengifo, while the production was handled by Torres and Rengifo. It is described as cumbia song with influences of reggaeton and urban style. The song also have some elements of deambow and a 'touch' of rap from Becerra. The song lasts for a duration of two minutes and forty five seconds. It is written in the key of D Minor, with a moderately fast tempo of 92 beats per minute. Lyrically, the song speaks of about having relationship issues. Specifically, the girls express the confusion of being private with someone but not being in an official relationship.

Tini had already experimented with the cumbia genre on her 2020 third studio album Tini Tini Tini where the cumbian genre stands out most on the song "22". She also added during interview for Vanity Teen:

"I think that the song 22 is like a first cousin of Miénteme. Miénteme is also a fusion of cumbia with reggaeton, just like 22. When I realized people liked that song so much, I felt joyful because, at first, it was a challenge to release it as a single. I mean, 22 sounded like reggaeton, but, at the same time, it was kind of different."

== Music video ==
=== Development ===
The music video was released alongside the song on April 29, 2021, on Tini's YouTube channel. It was directed by Argentine music video director Diego Peskins. The song's video clip, presented as a Thelma & Louise – style road movie, accumulated half a million views within an hour of its release, reaching 1 in trends in Argentina, among other countries. The video includes appearance by Argentine actor Juan Sorini. The music video has received over 700 million views, as of August 2024.

=== Synopsis ===
The video begins with Tini and Becerra as thieves who have been running away; Tini is seen driving in a car next to Becerra who is sitting counting bills. When the song begins they can be seen outside the car, Tini is standing and Becerra is sitting. Tini is wearing a black top with gold necklaces, green pants, and black and white sneakers and Becerra is wearing a white sleeveless shirt with a gold necklace, light blue jeans, white sneakers and a jean jacket with short sleeves that she would wear later.

While they sing, they run out of car fuel and motorcyclists come, one of them played by Juan Sorini that follows Tini. Tini and Becerra arrive at a gas station, enter and sit while watching dancers, then they stand and dance with them. Sorini and the Motorcyclists arrive but ignore them while they dance. Later, Becerra can be seen sitting at a bar counter singing while holding a drink. Sorini and the Motorcyclists play a machine video game, and Tini has drinks in hand for Sorini and the motorcyclists who are having fun next to Tini and Becerra. While being distracted by Tini, María steals Sorini's motorcycle keys that are in his jacket.

During the bridge of song, Tini and Becerra can be seen dancing and singing outside the gas station, while behind they have burning video game machines. Tini is wearing a short green T-shirt with black circles and triangle long sleeves, black and white trainers and white pants with circles and green and black flowers and Becerra is wearing an orange tank top with an orange glove that has stones on it, white pants with black, orange and green stripes and white trainers. Tini and Sorini are having fun, and Becerra waits for Tini on one of the motorcyclists' motorcycles. When Sorini is taking off his shirt, he is trapped and Tini escapes. Finally Tini and Becerra escape on the motorcycle.

== Live performances ==
Tini performed "Miénteme" live for the first time at the Argentine show Los Mammones on May 4, 2021. On June 26, 2021, Becerra also performed the song at the same show. On July 23, 2021, Tini sang the song live at the 18th Premios Juventud ceremony, held in Miami. On July 31, 2021, Tini performed an acoustic version of the song on a Mexican show Cuéntamelo Ya!. On September 3, 2021, Tini sang the song at the Coca-Cola Music Experience festival in Madrid. Tini and Becerra made their duet debut live performance during Becerra's Animal Tour at the Teatro Gran Rivadavia in Buenos Aires, Argentina on November 2, 2021. On October 30, 2021, Tini performed the song at her show in Posadas, Misiones. The song is also included in both Tini's Tini Tour 2022 and Becerra's Animal Tour set list. On July 9, 2022, Tini performed "Miénteme" alongside "La Triple T" at the 2022 MTV Millennial Awards.

== Credits and personnel ==
Credits adapted from Tidal.

- Tini – lead vocals, songwriter
- María Becerra – vocals, songwriter
- Tom Norris – mixing engineer, mastering engineer
- Big One – recording engineer
- Elena Rose – songwriter
- Mauricio Rengifo – producer, songwriter, recording engineer, programming
- Enzo Ezequiel Sauthier – songwriter
- FMK – songwriter
- Andrés Torres – producer, songwriter, recording engineer, programming

== Accolades ==
Year	Organization	Award	Result	Ref.
2021	Quiero Awards	Best Pop Video	Nominated	
2021	Quiero Awards	Video of The Year	Nominated	
2021	Musa Awards	International Collaboration of the Year	Nominated	
2021	Actuality Awards	Best Female Song	Won	
2022	Urban Music Awards	Collaboration of the Year	Nominated	
2022	Urban Music Awards	Video of the Year - New Artist	Nominated	
2022	Lo Mas Premios Escuchado	Song of The Year	Won	
2022	Premios Odeón	Best Latin Song	Nominated	
2022	Gardel Awards	Song of The Year	Won	
2022	Gardel Awards	Record of The Year	Nominated	
2022	Gardel Awards	Best Pop Song	Won	
2022	The PopHub Awards	Best Choreography	Won	

== Charts ==
=== Weekly charts ===
Weekly chart performance for "Miénteme"
Chart (2021–24)	Peak position
Argentina Hot 100 (Billboard)	1
Argentina Airplay (Monitor Latino)	1
Argentina Latin Airplay (Monitor Latino)	1
Argentina National Songs (Monitor Latino)	1
Bolivia Airplay (Monitor Latino)	3
Bolivia Songs (Billboard)	9
Brazil (Top 100 Brasil)	72
Chile (Monitor Latino)	5
Colombia (National-Report)	29
Colombia Airplay (Monitor Latino)	4
Costa Rica (FONOTICA)	1
Costa Rica (Monitor Latino)	1
Ecuador (Monitor Latino)	6
Ecuador (National-Report)	5
El Salvador (Monitor Latino)	2
Global 200 (Billboard)	65
Guatemala Airplay (Monitor Latino)	14
Latin America (Monitor Latino)	1
Mexico Espanol Airplay (Billboard)	18
Panama (PRODUCE)	42
Panama Airplay (Monitor Latino)	2
Paraguay (Monitor Latino)	2
Peru (Monitor Latino)	3
Spain (Promusicae)	3
Uruguay (Monitor Latino)	1
US Latin Rhythm Airplay (Billboard)	25
Venezuela Airplay (Monitor Latino)	8

=== Monthly charts ===
Monthly chart performance for "Miénteme"
Chart (2021)	Peak position
Paraguay (SGP)	3
Uruguay (CUD)	1

=== Year-end charts ===
Year-end chart performance for "Miénteme"
Chart (2021)	Position
Argentina (Monitor Latino)	3
Argentina Latin Airplay (Monitor Latino)	3
Bolivia (Monitor Latino)	4
Chile (Monitor Latino)	27
Colombia Airplay (Monitor Latino)	53
Costa Rica (Monitor Latino)	7
Ecuador (Monitor Latino)	10
El Salvador (Monitor Latino)	36
Global 200 (Billboard)	160
Latin America (Monitor Latino)	3
Panama Airplay (Monitor Latino)	4
Paraguay (Monitor Latino)	6
Peru (Monitor Latino)	27
Spain (PROMUSICAE)	16
Uruguay (Monitor Latino)	2
Venezuela Airplay (Monitor Latino)	14

== Certifications ==
Region	Certification	Certified units/sales
Argentina (CAPIF)	Diamond	135,000^{*}
Brazil (Pro-Música Brasil)	Platinum	40,000^{‡}
Colombia	4× Platinum	
Mexico (AMPROFON)	Diamond+Gold	770,000^{‡}
Peru	Platinum	
Spain (Promusicae)	7× Platinum	420,000^{‡}
Uruguay (CUD)	3× Platinum	12,000^{^}
Streaming
Chile (PROFOVI)	Gold	10,000,000
^{*} Sales figures based on certification alone.^{^} Shipments figures based on certification alone.^{‡} Sales+streaming figures based on certification alone.

== See also ==
- 2021 in Latin music
- List of airplay number-one hits of the 2020s (Argentina)
- List of Billboard Argentina Hot 100 number-one singles of 2021
- List of best-selling singles in Spain
