= La Joaqui =

Argentine singer (born 1994)

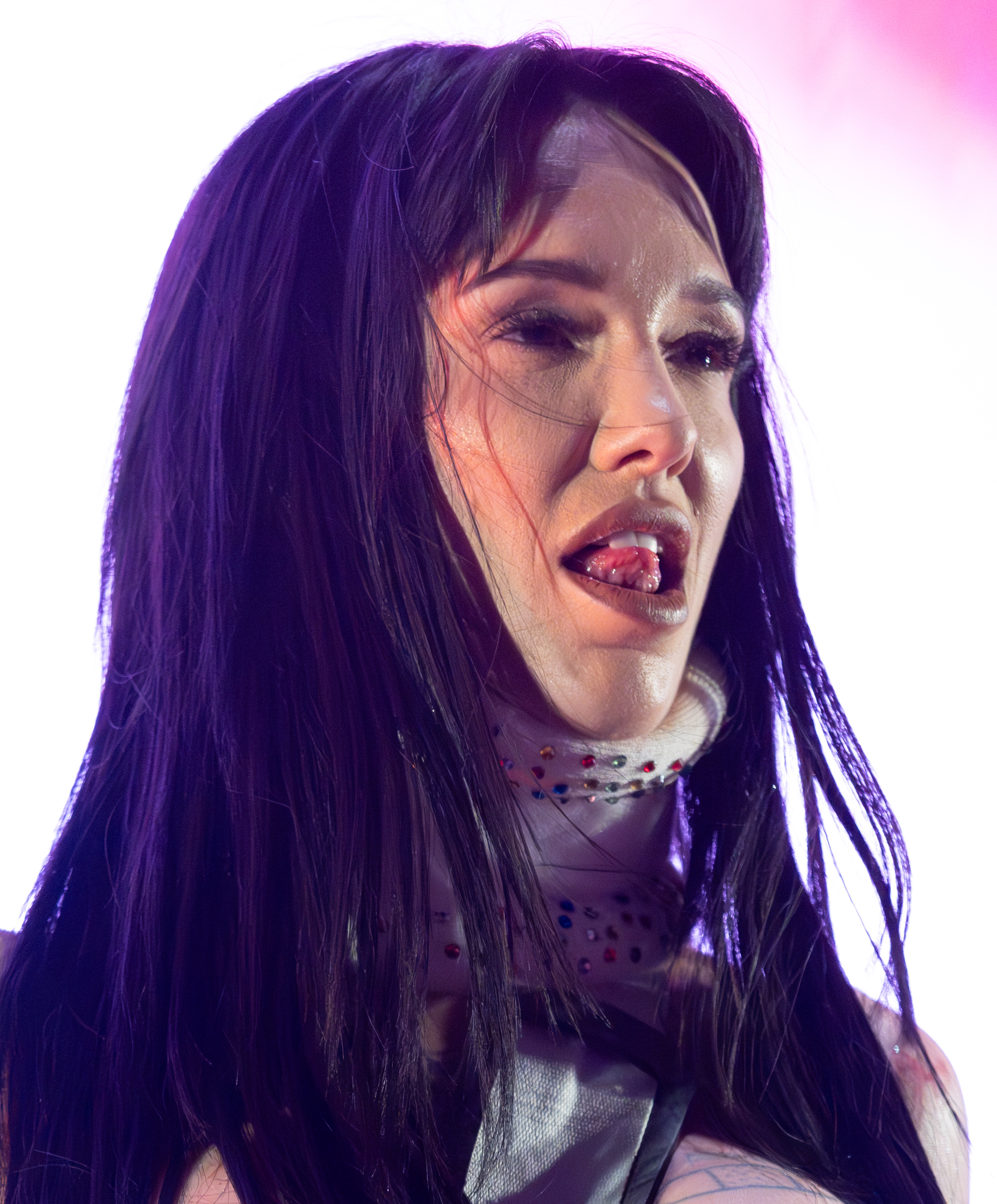
- La Joaqui in 2025
- Born: Joaquinha Lerena de la Riva; 25 October 1994 (age 32)
- Occupations: Singer; songwriter
- Children: 2

Joaquinha Lerena de la Riva (born 25 October 1994), professionally known as la Joaqui, is an Argentinian singer and songwriter. She has released two studio albums. Her 2022 EP Barbie Copiloto featured the hit song "Dos Besitos". In 2023, she released the track "Muñecas" with Tini and Steve Aoki, which boosted her to international popularity.

== Early life ==
Joaquinha Lerena de la Riva was born on 24 October 1994 in Mar del Plata, Buenos Aires. She spent most of her childhood in Tamarindo, Costa Rica, later returning to her hometown in Argentina as a teenager. She became interested in rap music aged 18, participating twice in the Red Bull Batalla de Gallos freestyle battle (in 2014 and 2015). She became the first woman to classify at the event and reach the semi-finals.

== Career ==
La Joaqui gradually transitioned from freestyle battles to focus on a career in music and acting. In 2017, she released the single "Perdón Mamá Por Mi Vida Loca." Her acting debut came in 2019 with a role in the television series El Marginal 2, portraying the girlfriend of the character Diosito Borges. That same year, she released her debut studio album Harakiri, featuring songs such as "Cuántas Veces" and "Rocho."

Prior to the COVID-19 pandemic, La Joaqui was among the first Argentine artists to stage a virtual concert via social media, performing her hits, including "Ay Papi," "Más Mala Yo," and "Violenta" in a livestream titled The White Room. In early 2020, she opened for Karol G in Argentina.

In 2024, she collaborated with Kenia OS on the singles "Kitty" and "San Turrona RMX." In 2025, she collaborated Sevdaliza on the single "Heroína." Her song "Terapia de Choque," a collaboration with Doble P and Gusty DJ, was noted by Pitchfork for its dynamic production and expressive vocals.

== Personal life ==
La Joaqui has two children. From 2024 to July 2026, she was in a relationship with fellow singer Luck Ra.

== Discography ==
Studio albums

- Harakiri (2019)
- Mal Aprendida (2023)
- Tu Patrona De Lujo (2024)

Live albums

- The White Room (Live Session) (2020)

Extended plays

- Barbie Copiloto (2022)
