= La Loto =

2022 single by Tini, Becky G and Anitta

Single by Tini, Becky G and Anitta

from the album Cupido
- Language: Spanish
- English title: "The Lotto"
- Released: July 6, 2022
- Genre: Reggaeton
- Length: 3:10
- Label: Hollywood; Sony Latin
- Composers: Andrés Torres; Mauricio Rengifo
- Lyricists: Martina Stoessel; Elena Rose; Rebbeca Marie Gomez; Larissa de Macedo Machado
- Producers: Andrés Torres; Mauricio Rengifo

Tini singles chronology
"Suéltame" (2022)	"La Loto" (2022)	"El Último Beso" (2022)

Becky G singles chronology
"Bailé Con Mi Ex" (2022)	"La Loto" (2022)	"Amantes" (2022)

Anitta singles chronology
"Tudo Nosso" (2022)	"La Loto" (2022)	"No Más" (2022)

Music video
- "La Loto" on YouTube

"La Loto" (transl. "The Lotto") is a song by Argentine singer Tini, American singer Becky G and Brazilian singer Anitta. It was released on July 6, 2022, through Hollywood Records and Sony Music Latin as the seventh single from Tini's fourth studio album, Cupido (2023). The song was written by the three singers alongside Elena Rose, while Andrés Torres and Mauricio Rengifo handled musical composition and production.

Tini collaborated with both artists for the first time, while Gomez and Anitta previously sang on a remix version of Maluma's "Mala Mía"; Gomez had also featured in a duet with Anitta, on the song "Banana".

"La Loto" is a primary bass-heavy reggaetón party track, with some urbano and modern hip hop influence. The lyrical content focuses on the usual pop themes of self-confidence and heavy partying; overall, the song features a theme of female solidarity and camaraderie. “La Loto” peaked at #6 on Billboard Argentina Hot 100, while also reaching #16 on Billboard's US Latin Digital Song Sales and #8 on US Latin Pop Airplay.

== Background and release ==
Tini, Becky G and Anitta were part of WhatsApp's “Escuchanos, Miranos” campaign in celebration of Women's History Month. Soon after, rumors started to surface that the three were working on a song together, and in an interview with Billboard, Anitta confirmed and revealed that a “super cool” collaboration with Tini and Gomez was in the works.

In an interview, Tini said about the collaboration: “The truth is that both of them have been great references throughout my musical growth, as women in the industry and as artists, I have to say that I have always dreamt of doing something with one of them. And now having them, together in a song of mine, recording this powerful video – I feel that the truth is, it is a dream come true and I am happy to share this with them.” Gomez also spoke about the collaboration in an Instagram video, saying: “How empowering it is to see three women hustlers coming together for a bop. Anitta swung by and so did Tini, and we were all hanging out and we were talking about girl power. We got to do something together!” [...] We're a force to reckon with now in the music industry. The way I walk into a room, when I see my female counterparts, it's different. Instead of trying to make headlines about who is fighting about what, it's about our record-breaking numbers.”

On June 27, Tini announced via her social media, that a song was coming with the Brazilian and American singers. On July 4, Tini announced the release date of the song with a fragment of the video. On July 6, the song was released, along with its music video on Tini's YouTube channel.

== Composition ==
"La Loto" was written by Tini, Becky G, Anitta, and Elena Rose; Andrés Torres and Mauricio "El Dandee" Rengifo composed and produced the song. The song is written in the key of D♭ major, with a moderately fast tempo of 90 beats per minute. It is a reggaeton song that lasts for a duration of three minutes and ten seconds. The song also has a Latin rhythm, and is described by Tini as exploring more urban nuances rarely heard in her music.

Lyrically, the song revolves around sex, or "sinning" as the girls call it in the chorus, with themes of female empowerment. Tini opens the song by singing about being in a party, saying: "Today we're sweating off all the makeup [...] This now looks like our runway". Anitta takes the second verse: "I fly directly from Miami to Rio [...] I brought Tini, we're gonna make a tremendous mess" before stating "Diamonds shining from head to toe/ The one that's with me won the lotto". Finally, Gomez sings the third verse: "We got all the drip, drip, all of Gucci-cci", and referencing the couple Lele Pons and Guaynaa, followed by "Short dress with nothing under/ This is what I work for". In the chorus, the girls state that they don't care about other people's opinions, and that "Tonight it seems we're sinning/ Tomorrow we go confess". The line "The baby with me won the lotto" expresses female empowerment, with the girls alluding to being the biggest and best prize their partners could have.

== Music video ==
The music video for "La Loto" was shot in Los Angeles. It was co-directed by Argentine director Diego Peskins and Venezuelan Daniel Duran, both having worked with the singers on their previous songs. Rather than the typically-modern nightclub scenes of many music videos, “La Loto” takes place in a 1920s-style “speakeasy” setting, with rather dark, subdued lighting, along with jewels, diamonds and gold elements. The three singers are all wearing diamond-studded, shiny and revealing outfits, while the background dancers are simply in all-black clothing. Overall, the video’s style and feeling can best be described as sexy, with some Burlesque elements, as well as early-Hollywood, somewhat “vintage” looks influenced by 1920s, 1930s, and 1940s actresses. The visual appeal is offset with the pulsating rhythms of Urbano Latino music.

In an interview with Rolling Stone, Tini herself described the video as a “burlesque”-style visual and added that “…This video has an aesthetic that is quite vintage, like a burlesque, like Moulin Rouge, as in the old times. The song makes you feel powerful and I think that's what each of us wants to convey on the set.”

Meanwhile, Gomez commented “This video is so fire… The concept, the visuals, the outfits, the hair, the looks, the makeup; it's serving, for sure.”

=== Synopsis ===
The video opens with Tini seated at a vanity in a dressing room as she finishes applying her makeup. The camera begins by briefly filming her reflection, while she says to herself, “Un poquitito; un poquitito te podés emborrachar. Dos copas de vino…” (trans: “You can get a little bit drunk, a little bit; Two glasses of wine…”). At this point, Tini puts her makeup brush down, and the camera pans to the right as she begins singing directly to it. She is wearing a gold sequined dress with her hair in a long ponytail. She then stands up, and in the room with her are Becky G and Anitta, both dressed similarly and getting ready.

Next, Tini is entering a crowded bar, in a jewel-studded black catsuit and stilettos, wearing gold sunglasses and a large, pink faux-fur coat. Her dancers approach her and take her coat, while she confidently walks around the bar, greeting the patrons and other dancers. She then is on a darkened stage, and the group of male and female dancers join Tini in executing the choreography. Parts of the dance routine feature the use of chairs and seated moves.

On the second verse, Anitta is at the bar then turns around to face the camera and begins dancing on and around the bar. She is wearing stilettos with a typically burlesque-style outfit. Becky G is seen sitting on a sofa, in an all-black ensemble, surrounded by opulent pearls and vintage jewelry, with the male dancers wearing masquerade ball masks. The three singers are finally shown seated together, in their original looks, copying each other as they cross and un-cross their legs on the couch. The trio is finally shown dancing on a stage.

== Accolades ==
Awards and nominations for "La Loto"
Organization	Year	Category	Result	Ref.
Premios Gardel	2023	Best Urban Collaboration	Nominated	
Premios Juventud	2023	Girl Power	Nominated	
Premios Juventud	2023	Hottest Choreo	Nominated	
Premios Tu Música Urbano	2023	Video of the Year	Nominated	
Top 50 Music Awards	2023	Best Collaboration	Nominated	
Lo Nuestro Awards	2024	Urban/Pop Collaboration of the Year	Nominated	

== Personnel ==
Credits adapted from Tidal.

- Tini – lead vocals, songwriter
- Becky G – vocals, songwriter
- Anitta – vocals, songwriter
- Carlos A. Molina – recording engineer
- Tom Norris – mixing engineer, mastering engineer
- Mauricio Rengifo – producer, songwriter, recording engineer, programming
- Elena Rose – songwriter
- Andrés Torres – producer, songwriter, recording engineer, programming

== Charts ==
Chart performance for "La Loto"
Chart (2022)	Peak position
Argentina Hot 100 (Billboard)	7
Argentina Airplay (Monitor Latino)	5
Bolivia Airplay (Monitor Latino)	4
Brazil (Top 100 Brasil)	63
Costa Rica Urbano (Monitor Latino)	14
Ecuador Urbano (Monitor Latino)	14
El Salvador Pop (Monitor Latino)	6
Global 200 (Billboard)	197
Global Excl. US (Billboard)	114
Guatemala Pop (Monitor Latino)	16
Mexico (Billboard Mexican Airplay)	23
Mexico (Billboard Mexico Espanol Airplay)	11
Panama (PRODUCE)	24
Panama Urbano (Monitor Latino)	6
Paraguay (SGP)	30
Paraguay Urbano (Monitor Latino)	7
Portugal (AFP)	151
Puerto Rico Urbano (Monitor Latino)	8
Spain (PROMUSICAE)	78
Uruguay (CUD)	10
Uruguay (Monitor Latino)	1
US Latin Digital Song Sales (Billboard)	16
US Latin Pop Airplay (Billboard)	8

=== Year-end charts ===
2022 year-end chart performance for "La Loto"
Chart (2022)	Position
Argentina (Monitor Latino)	61
Bolivia (Monitor Latino)	47
Ecuador (Monitor Latino)	94
Uruguay (Monitor Latino)	40

== Certifications ==
Region	Certification	Certified units/sales
Argentina (CAPIF)	Platinum	20,000^{*}
Brazil (Pro-Música Brasil)	Platinum	40,000^{‡}
Mexico (AMPROFON)	Gold	70,000^{‡}
Peru	Gold	
Spain (Promusicae)	Gold	30,000^{‡}
^{*} Sales figures based on certification alone.^{‡} Sales+streaming figures based on certification alone.
