= Maldita Foto =

2021 single by Tini featuring Manuel Turizo

Single by Tini and Manuel Turizo

from the album Cupido
- Released: August 19, 2021
- Recorded: 2021
- Studio: Miami, Florida
- Genre: Latin pop; reggaeton
- Length: 3:10
- Label: Hollywood; Sony Latin
- Songwriters: Martina Stoessel; Manuel Turizo; Mauricio Rengifo; Andrés Torres; Julián Turizo Zapata; Juan Diego Medina Vélez
- Producers: Rengifo; Torres

Tini singles chronology
"La Niña de la Escuela" (2021)	"Maldita Foto" (2021)	"Tú No Me Conoces" (2021)

Manuel Turizo singles chronology
"Amor en Coma" (2021)	"Maldita Foto" (2021)	"Una Vaina Loca" (2021)

Music video
- "Maldita Foto" on YouTube

"Maldita Foto" (transl. "Damn Photo") is a song by Argentine singer Tini and Colombian singer Manuel Turizo. It was released on August 19, 2021, through Hollywood Records and Sony Music Latin as the second single from Tini's fourth studio album, Cupido (2023), along with its accompanied music video.

It was written by Tini and Turizo, alongside songwriters Julián Turizo, Juan Diego Medina and its producers Mauricio Rengifo and Andrés Torres. This is the first collaboration between Tini and Turizo on a Latin pop song, that features sounds of reggaeton and some sounds of electric guitar for a few seconds at the beginning and the end. Lyrically, the song talks about a breakup in a relationship, a two exes who are noticed each other in a photo taken at the right moment, and then on its a trip down memory lane reminiscing on their time together.

== Background ==
"Maldita Foto" was written by Tini and Turizo, together with the songwriters Mauricio Rengifo, Andrés Torres, Juan Diego Medina and Julián Turizo, while the song's production was handled by Rengifo and Torres. Tini has been talking about the song since May, 2021, where she pointed out that it is a song with a beautiful melody, and that she is very satisfied with the new collaboration. Later was revealed that the artist she collaborate with is Manuel Turizo.

With images that Tini and Turizo shared on their respective social networks, both artists released previews of this collaboration days before the song was released. On August 16, 2021, they released the verse of the song and revealed how the song will come out on August 19, 2021. Material that dialogues with a music video in which they appear very united. Speaking about the song concept, in an interview with the media "You online", Tini and Turizo said:

"Maldita Foto" sings about the breakdown of a relationship. They are going to feel very identified with the letter, and the music makes you dance and smile, despite the fact that at the same time it is, telling a not-so-good story. It's like processing pain through beautiful music.

== Composition ==
"Maldita Foto" is primary latin pop song with some elements of reggaeton, which Tini and Turizo often perform in their latest songs. Also this style represents Latin American music. In addition to the elements of regguaeton, an electric guitar is also present for a few seconds at the beginning and end of the song.

Turizo added during an interview for magazine "Hola".

"I wake up thinking about music, it's part of my conversations, my hobbies. In my free time, I like to study the business of music, to see and know what's going on, who is coming out, what is the new sound everyone wants to hear."

== Music video ==
Filming for the song's music video took place in Miami, on 18–19 May 2021. A teaser video was posted on both artists social networks on August 17, 2021. The official music video was released on August 19, 2021, on Tini's official YouTube channel. The music video had half a million views in the first minutes of its release.

Tini and Turizo play ex-lovers in music video. The music video begins as Tini and her boyfriend enter a restaurant on a date. Tini pulls out her cell phone and her boyfriend takes a picture of her. Across, at the other table is Turizo with his girlfriend. Turizo's girlfriend also takes a picture of him. Two exes who, in true serendipitous fashion, spot each other in a photo taken at the right moment and the right place. From then on, it's a trip down memory lane reminiscing on their time together.

== Credits and personnel ==
Credits adapted from Tidal.

- Tini – vocals, songwriter
- Manuel Turizo – vocals, songwriter
- Juan Diego Medina Vélez – songwriter
- Laura Mercedez – recording engineer
- Tom Norris – mixing engineer, mastering engineer
- Mauricio Rengifo – producer, songwriter, recording engineer, programing
- Andrés Torres – producer, songwriter, recording engineer, programing
- Julián Turizo Zapata – songwriter
- Sebastián Chicchón - graphic designer

== Accolades ==
Year	Organization	Award	Result	Ref.
2021	Quiero Awards	Best Female Video	Nominated	
2021	Quiero Awards	Best Extraordinarye Meeting	Nominated	

== Release history ==
Release history for "Maldita Foto"
Region	Date	Format	Label	Ref.
Various	August 19, 2021	Digital download; Streaming	Sony Latin	

== Charts ==
=== Weekly charts ===
Weekly chart performance for "Maldita Foto"
Chart (2021)	Peak position
Argentina Hot 100 (Billboard)	11
Argentina Airplay (Monitor Latino)	1
Argentina National Songs (Monitor Latino)	1
Costa Rica Urbano (Monitor Latino)	5
Ecuador Urban (Monitor Latino)	11
El Salvador (Monitor Latino)	13
Mexico Airplay (Billboard)	46
Mexico Espanol Airplay (Billboard)	17
Paraguay (SGP)	19
Spain (PROMUSICAE)	87
US Latin Pop Airplay (Billboard)	15
Uruguay (Monitor Latino)	3

=== Year-end charts ===
Year-end chart performance for "Maldita Foto"
Chart (2021)	Position
Argentina (Monitor Latino)	40
Argentina Latin Airplay (Monitor Latino)	30

== Certifications ==
Region	Certification	Certified units/sales
Argentina (CAPIF)	Platinum	20,000^{‡}
Uruguay (CUD)	Platinum	4,000^{^}
Peru	Platinum	
Spain (Promusicae)	Gold	30,000^{‡}
^{^} Shipments figures based on certification alone.^{‡} Sales+streaming figures based on certification alone.

== See also ==
- List of airplay number-one hits of the 2010s (Argentina)
