= Bar (song) =

2021 single by Tini featuring L-Gante

Single by Tini and L-Gante

from the album Cupido
- Language: Spanish
- Released: November 11, 2021
- Recorded: 2021
- Genre: Reggaeton; cumbia
- Length: 2:40
- Label: Hollywood; Sony Latin
- Songwriters: Martina Stoessel; L-Gante; Elena Rose; Kevin Rivas; Andrés Torres; Mauricio Rengifo
- Producers: Rengifo; Torres

Tini singles chronology
"Tú No Me Conoces" (2021)	"Bar" (2021)	"Fantasi" (2021)

L-Gante singles chronology
"Bandera" (2021)	"Bar" (2021)	"La Mano de Dios" (2021)

Music video
- "Bar" on YouTube

"Bar" is a song by Argentine singer Tini and Argentine rapper L-Gante. It was released on November 11, 2021, through Hollywood Records and Sony Music Latin as the third single from Tini's fourth studio album, Cupido (2023), along with its accompanied music video. It was written by the two singers, alongside Elena Rose, Kevin Rivas and its producers Mauricio Rengifo and Andrés Torres. The track was described as a "highly danceable and playful song", which combines reggaeton and cumbia genres.

== Background and composition ==
Tini and L-Gante collaborate for the first time on "Bar". The artists announced the launch from their social networks. On November 8, 2021, Tini released the first teaser for the song, and revealed that it will be a collaboration with singer of cumbia L-Gante, and how the song coming out on November 11, 2021. Later, both artists also posted two more teasers on their social media accounts. "One day and this summer bomb comes out," wrote L-Gante on his social networks 24 hours before the premiere of the song. For her part, Tini wrote on Twitter a part of the chorus of the song, "Porque otra boca voy a besar" witch means "Because I'm going to kiss another mouth." On November 11, the song was released on Tini's YouTube channel. The song is about how girl left her boyfriend at the bar, and he suffers for her, while she lives the best years of her life. The song is combination of reggaeton and cumbia better known as cachengue sound, that these two artists often perform in their latest songs and which is a typical music genre that representing Latin American music.

== Music video ==
The shoot of the music video took place in Argentina. It was Directed by Argentine director Diego Peskins, who was also in charge of the video for "Miénteme", the video for "Bar" shows a party atmosphere, where luxury cars and lots of nighttime fun appear. In the video clip we see the Argentine duo arriving at a mansion where they are greeted by a luxurious party. Neon lights, elegant clothes and bottles of champagne are part of the visual elements of the video. Suddenly, the aesthetic changes completely. We see Tini in a much more casual outfit in what looks like a "popular bowling alley." Accompanied by some dancers, she begins a coordinated choreography.

== Credits and personnel ==
Credits adapted from Genius.

- Tini – lead vocals, songwriter
- L-Gante – vocals, songwriter
- Tom Norris – mixing engineer, mastering engineer
- Elena Rose – songwriter
- Kevin Rivas – songwriter
- Mauricio Rengifo – producer, songwriter, recording engineer, programming
- Sergio Rivas – recording engineer
- Andrés Torres – producer, songwriter, recording engineer, programming

== Charts ==
=== Weekly charts ===
Weekly chart performance for "Bar"
Chart (2021–22)	Peak position
Argentina Hot 100 (Billboard)	1
Argentina Airplay (Monitor Latino)	4
Argentina Latin Airplay (Monitor Latino)	4
Argentina National Songs (Monitor Latino)	1
Bolivia Airplay (Monitor Latino)	5
Bolivia Songs (Billboard)	3
Costa Rica Urban (Monitor Latino)	9
Ecuador Urban (Monitor Latino)	12
El Salvador (Monitor Latino)	12
Global 200 (Billboard)	125
Paraguay (Monitor Latino)	1
Peru Urban (Monitor Latino)	3
Spain (PROMUSICAE)	78
Uruguay (Monitor Latino)	5
Uruguay Latin Airplay (Monitor Latino)	5

=== Monthly charts ===
Monthly chart performance for "Bar"
Chart (2021)	Peak position
Paraguay (SGP)	7
Uruguay (CUD)	1

=== Year-end charts ===
Year-end chart performance for "Bar"
Chart (2022)	Peak position
Argentina (Monitor Latino)	58
Bolivia (Monitor Latino)	30
Ecuador Urbano (Monitor Latino)	90
Paraguay (Monitor Latino)	11
Uruguay (Monitor Latino)	37

== Certifications ==
Region	Certification	Certified units/sales
Argentina (CAPIF)	3× Platinum	60,000^{‡}
Uruguay (CUD)	3× Platinum	12,000^{^}
Spain (Promusicae)	Platinum	60,000^{‡}
Streaming
Chile (PROFOVI)	Gold	17,373,244
^{^} Shipments figures based on certification alone.^{‡} Sales+streaming figures based on certification alone.

== See also ==
- List of airplay number-one hits of the 2010s (Argentina)
- List of Billboard Argentina Hot 100 number-one singles of 2021
- List of Billboard Argentina Hot 100 number-one singles of 2022
