= La Triple T =

2022 single by Tini

Single by Tini

from the album Cupido
- Language: Spanish
- English title: "The Triple T"
- Released: May 5, 2022
- Recorded: 2022
- Genre: Latin pop; cumbia; urban
- Length: 2:47
- Label: Hollywood; Sony Latin
- Songwriters: Martina Stoessel; Elena Rose; Andrés Torres; Mauricio Rengifo
- Producers: Fabiana Olive; Rengifo; Torres

Tini singles chronology
"Fantasi" (2022)	"La Triple T" (2022)	"Carne y Hueso" (2022)

Music video
- "La Triple T" on YouTube

"La Triple T" is a song by Argentine singer Tini. It was released on May 5, 2022, through Hollywood Records and Sony Music Latin as the fifth single from her fourth studio album, Cupido (2023). The song was written by Tini, Elena Rose, and its producers Andrés Torres and Mauricio Rengifo. It is her first solo song after a while and several successful collaborations throughout her career. The song debuted at number one on the Billboard Argentina Hot 100, becoming Tini's third number-one single on the chart following "Miénteme" and "Bar" in 2021.

== Background and composition ==
In early April 2022, Tini announced that she was recording a new song. She published part of the song on April 24, 2022, through her social media. On April 30, she released the second teaser for the song, where she revealed that the song is coming out on May 5. "La Triple T" takes us back to her already catchphrase "Tini Tini Tini". The song follows the same vein as some of her previous hits.

Tini expressed about this new release adding: "This single is a reminder to enjoy life and not take yourself too seriously. I hope the music and lyrics can take you to your happy place, whether it's a club or a bar with your friends. Ultimately, I want people to have fun while listening 'La Triple T'". The song is combination of latin pop, cumbia and urban pop, with mix of reggaeton sound, and was written by Tini, Elena Rose, Andres Torres and Mauricio Rengifo.

== Music video ==
The shoot of the music video took place in Buenos Aires, Argentina. It was directed by Argentine director Diego Peskins, who also produced some of her previous hits like "Miénteme" and "Bar", and was produced by Fabiana Olive.

In the music video, Tini dances a choreography for the song accompanied by a group of dancers and is seen her jumping on an inflatable. Three Drag queens can also be seen who are dressed in outfits that reference Stoessel's who parade, she and other people score them with posters of the number 10. The first is dressed in one of the outfits that Tini wore in the "22" video, the second is dressed in one of the outfits from the "Recuerdo" video clip, and the third is dressed in one of the outfits from the Quiero Volver Tour.

== Critical reception ==
"La Triple T" received mainly positive reviews, writing: "'La Triple T’ is a hymn of joy and celebration, ideal to portray this moment of the artist. Tini's talent and the festive images of the video combine perfectly". J.R. of Billboard said: "Tini has discovered a sound she can call her own, fusing cumbia with urban pop sounds. Her new single, 'La Triple T,' continues to thread that innovative line, becoming an anthem for celebrating life and enjoying the moment".

== Charts ==
Chart performance for "La Triple T"
Chart (2022)	Peak position
Argentina Hot 100 (Billboard)	1
Argentina National Songs (Monitor Latino)	1
Bolivia Airplay (Monitor Latino)	8
Bolivia (Billboard)	24
Chile (Monitor Latino)	34
Chile Urbano (Monitor Latino)	12
Ecuador Urbano (Monitor Latino)	7
Global 200 (Billboard)	168
Panama (PRODUCE)	37
Panama Urbano (Monitor Latino)	14
Paraguay (SGP)	5
Paraguay (Monitor Latino)	3
Paraguay Urbano (Monitor Latino)	3
Peru Urbano (Monitor Latino)	3
Uruguay (CUD)	3
Uruguay (Monitor Latino)	1
Uruguay Latin Airplay (Monitor Latino)	2

== Certifications ==
Region	Certification	Certified units/sales
Argentina (CAPIF)	2× Platinum	40,000^{*}
Brazil (Pro-Música Brasil)	Gold	20,000^{‡}
Mexico (AMPROFON)	Gold	70,000^{‡}
Peru	Gold	
Spain (Promusicae)	Platinum	60,000^{‡}
Streaming
Ecuador	Gold	15,000,000
^{*} Sales figures based on certification alone.^{‡} Sales+streaming figures based on certification alone.
