= Andrés Torres (producer) =

Colombian record producer and musician (born 1987)

- Born: Bogotá, Colombia
- Education: Pontifical Xavierian University; Musicians Institute
- Occupations: Record producer; musician
- Musical career
- Instruments: Drums; piano; guitar
- Years active: 2012–present

Andrés Torres is a Colombian record producer, musician, and multi-instrumentalist, best known for his work in Latin music, including producing the 2017 single "Despacito" by Luis Fonsi featuring Daddy Yankee, in addition to a remix with Justin Bieber. It was the first Latin song to top the Billboard Hot 100 for 16 weeks. It also reached number 1 on Hot Latin Songs. Torres has won 3 Latin Grammy Awards and been nominated for an additional 24, and is also a Grammy Award nominee.

== Career ==
Torres and his frequent producing partner Mauricio Rengifo were listed at #27 on the Billboard list of the 50 Greatest Producers of the 21st Century. As a duo, they are known for their work in Latin pop, mixing live instruments with technology. They won the 2020 Latin Grammy Award for Producer of the Year, and have been nominated in that category two other times. They have been working together since 2015, on music for artists including Luis Fonsi, Sebastian Yatra, Morat, Thalía, Demi Lovato, Tini, Christina Aguilera, and OneRepublic.

== Personal life ==
Torres was born and raised in Colombia. He graduated from the Musicians Institute in Los Angeles, where he is currently based.

== Discography ==
=== Albums ===
Main personnel

Year	Title	Artist	Producer	Engineer	Songwriter	Musician
2014	Verte Nacer	Noel Schajris	Co-producer	No	No	No
2014	Tú y Yo	David Bisbal	No	Yes	No	Drums
2014	Al Son De Mi Corazón	Gusi	No	Yes	No	Drums
2015	Sirope	Alejandro Sanz	No	Yes	No	Drums
2015	Welcome to Babylon	Disciples of Babylon	Yes	No	No	Drums
2016	Buenaventura	La Santa Cecilia	No	Yes	Yes	Drums
2017	Extended Play Yatra	Sebastián Yatra	Yes	No	Yes	No
2017	The Rise and Fall of Babylon	Disciples of Babylon	Yes	No	No	No
2018	Rosa	Cami	No	No	No	Drums
2018	Quiero Volver	Tini	Yes	Yes	Yes	Guitar; Ukulele
2018	Balas Perdidas	Morat	Yes	Yes	Yes	Drums; Guitar; Keyboard
2019	Vida	Luis Fonsi	Yes	Yes	Yes	Guitar
2019	Fantasía	Sebastián Yatra	Yes	Yes	Yes	Drums; Guitar; Keyboard
2020	Tini Tini Tini	Tini	Yes	Yes	Yes	Guitar; Programming
2023	Alpha	Aitana	Yes	Yes	Yes	Guitar; Keyboards
2023	Cupido	Tini	Yes	Yes	Yes	No
2024	Un Mechón de Pelo	Tini	Yes	Yes	Yes	Guitar; Keyboards; Harmonica

Other

Year	Title	Artist	Producer	Engineer	Songwriter	Musician
2015	Manuel Medrano	Manuel Medrano	No	No	No	Drums
2016	Inesperado	Anahí	Yes	Yes	Yes	Drums; Piano; Synthesizer
2017	Mantra	Sebastián Yatra	Yes	No	Yes	No
2018	Agustín	Fonseca	Yes	Yes	Yes	Guitar; Ukulele; Keyboard
2019	¿Dónde Bailarán Las Niñas?	Ximena Sariñana	Yes	Yes	Yes	Guitar
2022	Aguilera	Christina Aguilera	Yes	Yes	Yes	Keyboards

=== Singles ===
Year	Title	Artist(s)	Producer	Engineer	Songwriter	Musician
2015	"Un Zombie a la Intemperie"	Alejandro Sanz	No	Yes	No	Drums
2017	"Despacito"	Luis Fonsi featuring Daddy Yankee	Yes	Yes	No	Guitar
2017	"Robarte un Beso"	Carlos Vives and Sebastián Yatra	Yes	Yes	Yes	Guitar; Ukulele
2017	"Échame La Culpa"	Luis Fonsi and Demi Lovato	Yes	Yes	Yes	Guitar
2017	"Cásate Conmigo"	Silvestre Dangond with Nicky Jam	Yes	Unknown	Yes	Unknown
2018	"Calypso"	Luis Fonsi and Stefflon Don	Yes	Yes	Yes	Guitar
2018	"Imposible"	Luis Fonsi and Ozuna	Yes	Yes	Yes	Guitar
2019	"Runaway"	Sebastián Yatra, Daddy Yankee and Natti Natasha featuring Jonas Brothers	Yes	Unknown	Yes	No
2019	"Un Año"	Sebastián Yatra with Reik	Yes	Unknown	Yes	Unknown
2020	"Siempre He Estado Aquí"	RBD	Yes	No	Yes	No
2021	"Canción Bonita"	Carlos Vives and Ricky Martin	Yes	Yes	Yes	Guitar; Keyboards
2021	"Miénteme"	Tini and María Becerra	Yes	Yes	Yes	No
2021	"Bar"	Tini and L-Gante	Yes	Yes	Yes	Guitar; Keyboards
2022	"La Triple T"	Tini	Yes	Yes	Yes	No
2022	"Suéltame"	Christina Aguilera and Tini	Yes	Yes	Yes	Keyboards
2024	"Gala y Dalí"	Nelly Furtado and Juanes	Yes	Yes	Yes	Guitar; Keyboards
2024	"We Pray"	Coldplay featuring Burna Boy, Little Simz, Elyanna and Tini	No	No	Yes	No
2024	"Pa"	Tini	Yes	Yes	Yes	Keyboards
2024	"Posta"	Tini	Yes	Yes	Yes	Keyboards
2024	"Buenos Aires"	Tini	Yes	Yes	Yes	Keyboards

== Awards and nominations ==
Latin Grammy Awards

Year	Nominated work	Category	Result	Ref.
2015	Sirope (by Alejandro Sanz)	Best Contemporary Pop Vocal Album	Won	
2015	Sirope (by Alejandro Sanz)	Album of the Year	Nominated	
2015	"Un Zombie a la Intemperie" (by Alejandro Sanz)	Record of the Year	Nominated	
2017	"Despacito" (by Luis Fonsi featuring Daddy Yankee)	Record of the Year	Won	
2018	Andrés Torres & Mauricio Rengifo	Producer of the Year	Nominated	
2018	"Robarte Un Beso" (by Carlos Vives featuring Sebastián Yatra)	Song of the Year	Nominated	
2018	"Cásate Conmigo" (by Silvestre Dangond featuring Nicky Jam)	Best Tropical Song	Nominated	
2018	"Simples Corazones" (by Fonseca)	Best Tropical Song	Nominated	
2019	Andrés Torres & Mauricio Rengifo	Producer of the Year	Nominated	
2019	Vida (by Luis Fonsi)	Album of the Year	Nominated	
2019	Fantasía (by Sebastián Yatra)	Album of the Year	Nominated	
2019	"La Plata" (by Juanes featuring Lalo Ebratt)	Record of the Year	Nominated	
2019	"Cobarde" (by Ximena Sariñana)	Record of the Year	Nominated	
2019	"Un Año" (by Sebastián Yatra featuring Reik)	Song of the Year	Nominated	
2020	Andrés Torres	Producer of the Year	Won	
2020	"Bonita" (by Juanes & Sebastián Yatra)	Best Pop Song	Nominated	
2020	"Bonita" (by Juanes & Sebastián Yatra)	Song of the Year	Nominated	
2021	"Canción Bonita" (by Carlos Vives and Ricky Martin)	Song of the Year	Nominated	
2021	"Canción Bonita" (by Carlos Vives and Ricky Martin)	Best Pop Song	Nominated	
2022	"A Veces Bien y a Veces Mal" (by Ricky Martin and Reik)	Song of the Year	Nominated	
2022	Viajante (by Fonseca)	Album of the Year	Nominated	
2022	Dharma (by Sebastián Yatra)	Album of the Year	Nominated	
2022	Aguilera (by Christina Aguilera)	Album of the Year	Nominated	
2023	"Contigo" (by Sebastián Yatra)	Best Pop Song	Nominated	
2023	Décimo Cuarto (by Andrés Cepeda)	Album of the Year	Nominated	

Grammy Awards

Year	Nominated work	Category	Result	Ref.
2018	"Despacito" (by Luis Fonsi and Daddy Yankee featuring Justin Bieber)	Record of the Year	Nominated	
