= Quiero Volver =

Studio album by Tini
- Released: 12 October 2018
- Recorded: 2017–2018
- Studio: Los Angeles
- Genre: Latin pop; reggaeton; reggae
- Length: 35:19
- Language: Spanish; English
- Label: Hollywood; Universal Latin
- Producer: Mauricio Rengifo; Andrés Torres; Pablo Benito; Alberto Hernández; Felipe Mejia; Josh Murty

Tini chronology
Tini (Martina Stoessel) (2016)	Quiero Volver (2018)	Tini Tini Tini (2020)

Singles from Quiero Volver
- 1. "Te Quiero Más" Released: 12 October 2017; 2. "Princesa" Released: 5 April 2018; 3. "Consejo de Amor" Released: 21 June 2018; 4. "Quiero Volver" Released: 2 August 2018; 5. "Por Que Te Vas" Released: 1 November 2018

Quiero Volver (English: I Want to Come Back) is the second solo album by Argentine singer Tini. It was released by Hollywood Records and Universal Music Latin on 12 October 2018. The album features guest appearances from Nacho, Karol G, Sebastian Yatra, Morat and Cali y El Dandee. The album comprises pop, Latin pop alongside ballads.

Five singles were released from the album: "Te Quiero Más" – the lead single from the album, "Princea", "Consejo de Amor", "Quiero Volver" and "Por Que te Vas". The album was available for pre-order. The album topped the charts in Argentina, becoming Tini's second number one album in the country as a solo artist. Outside of Argentina, the album met with moderate success in various European countries.

== Background and production ==
Quiero Volver contains 11 songs, mixed songs in Spanish and English. After launching her debut studio album Tini (Martina Stoessel), Tini began her world tour, at the end of which she declared that she had already started work on her second album. Andrés Torres, former producer of Luis Fonsi's hit song Despacito, produced the album. To recording the album, in November 2017, Tini went to Los Angeles, California, place in which Tini also recorded her debut album. Abandoning the character of Violetta and her more pop side to look towards the Latin genere and reggaeton, but there are ballads, as well as songs in English.

Together with Andrés Torres and other composers, Tini herself participated in the release and writing of the same. The whole album is very personal with Tini's personal stamp. Although the "Quiero Volver" song was written for her boyfriend Pepe, with whom she broke up, the video and the song itself were made in duet with her then current boyfriend Sebastian Yatra, which is special for her. Each poem except 'Consejo De Amor' is written in person by Tini. The album also has different genres, most of which are Latin rhythms, but there are ballads as well as songs in English.

== Promotion ==
Just after the release of Quiero Volver album, Tini did a promotion of the same. The first promotion was made on 12 October 2018, in Buenos Aires, in one shopping mall. There were a lot of fans, who were waiting patiently to take a picture with their idol. Tini singled out songs that were playing non stop at the mall. Tini also made an various appearances on the Argentine show Susana Gimenéz. Also in support of the album, Tini embarked on her second solo tour Quiero Volver Tour. Tini has represented songs in various Argentinian shows and radios, also appearing at various festivals.

== Singles ==
"Te Quiero Más" the album's lead single, was released on 12 October 2017, it was collaboration with Nacho.

"Princesa" was released on 5 April 2018, as the second single from the album and it was performed together by Stoessel and Karol G.

"Consejo de Amor" was released on 21 June 2018, as the third single from the album, it was collaboration with Morat.

"Quiero Volver" was released on 2 August 2018, as the fourth and single from the album, featuring Colombian singer Sebastian Yatra.

"Por Que Te Vas" was released on 1 November 2018, as the fifth and final single from album, featuring Cali y El Dandee.

=== Music videos ===
The music video for the first single from the album,"Te Quiero Más" was released on 13 November 2017.

On 6 April 2018, the music video for "Princesa", performed together by Stoessel and Karol G, was released.

On 22 June 2018, the music video for "Consejo de Amor" was released, performed by Stoessel and Morat.

On 3 August 2018, the music video for song with same name as album "Quiero Volver" was released, featuring Sebastian Yatra.

On 2 November 2018, the music video for "Por Que Te Vas" was released, featuring Cali y El Dandee.

== Track listing ==
No.	Title	Writer(s)	Producer(s)	Length
1.	"Quiero Volver" (with Sebastián Yatra)	Martina Stoessel; Mauricio Rengifo; Andrés Torres; Sebastián Obando; Daniela Blau; Alberto Hernández; Felipe Mejia	Mauricio Rengifo; Andrés Torres; Pablo Benito; Alberto Hernández; Felipe Mejia	3:04
2.	"Flores"	Stoessel; M. Rengifo; Torres	M. Rengifo; Torres; Benito	3:21
3.	"Princesa" (with Karol G)	Stoessel; M. Rengifo; Torres; Carolina Giraldo	M. Rengifo; Torres	3:23
4.	"Like That"	Stoessel; M. Rengifo; Torres; Jason Evigan	M. Rengifo; Torres; Benito	2:54
5.	"Por Que Te Vas" (with Cali y El Dandee)	Stoessel; M. Rengifo; Torres; Alejandro Rengifo	M. Rengifo; Torres; Benito; Josh Murty	3:27
6.	"Waves"	Stoessel; M. Rengifo; Torres; Evigan	M. Rengifo; Torres; Benito; Hernández; Mejia	3:10
7.	"Consejo de Amor" (featuring Morat)	M. Rengifo; Torres; Juan Pablo Isaza; Juan Pablo Villamil; Felipe Gonzalez Abad; Germán Duque; Sebastián Yepes	M. Rengifo; Torres	3:19
8.	"Never Ready"	Stoessel; M. Rengifo; Torres; Ross Golan	M. Rengifo; Torres; Benito	3:30
9.	"Love Is Love"	Stoessel; M. Rengifo; Torres; Leah Haywood; Daniel James	M. Rengifo; Torres; Benito	2:57
10.	"Te Quiero Más" (with Nacho)	Stoessel; M. Rengifo; Torres; Ignacio Mendoza	M. Rengifo; Torres	3:25
11.	"Respirar"	Stoessel; M. Rengifo; Torres	M. Rengifo; Torres; Benito	3:05
Total length:				35:19

== Charts ==
Chart (2018)	Peak position
Argentine Albums (CAPIF)	1
Austrian Albums (Ö3 Austria)	22
Belgian Albums (Ultratop Flanders)	138
Belgian Albums (Ultratop Wallonia)	132
French Albums (SNEP)	106
German Albums (Offizielle Top 100)	26
Italian Albums (FIMI)	77
Polish Albums (ZPAV)	49
Portuguese Albums (AFP)	34
Spanish Albums (Promusicae)	11
Swiss Albums (Schweizer Hitparade)	40

== Release history ==
Region	Date	Format(s)	Label
Various	12 October 2018	Digital download	Hollywood Records Universal Music
Argentina	12 October 2018	CD	Hollywood Records Universal Music
Holland	2018	CD	Hollywood Records

== See also ==
- Quiero Volver Tour
- 2018 in Latin music
