= Tini (singer) =

Argentine singer and actress (born 1997)

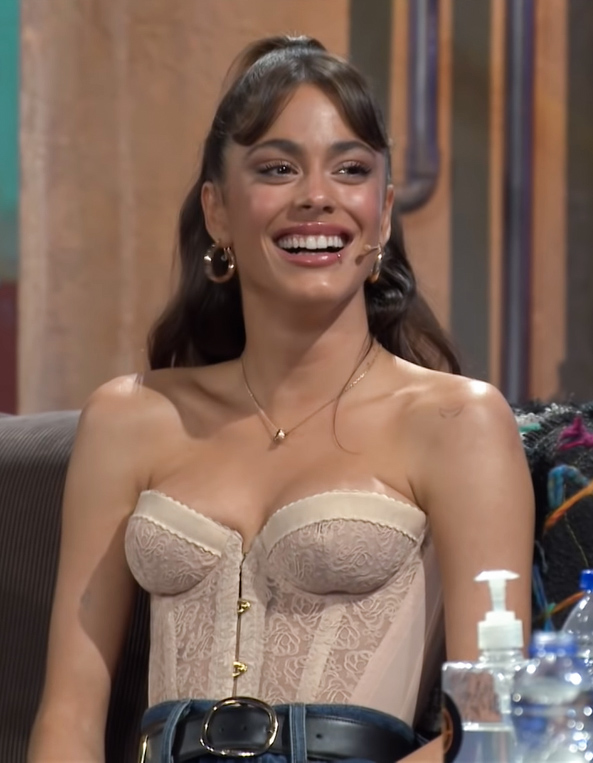
- Tini in 2021
- Born: Martina Stoessel; 21 March 1997 (age 29); Buenos Aires, Argentina
- Other name: La Triple T
- Occupations: Singer; actress
- Years active: 2007–present
- Works: Discography
- Partner: Rodrigo De Paul (2021–2023; 2025–present: engaged)
- Awards: Full list
- Musical career
- Genres: Urbano; cumbia; reggaeton; Latin pop; pop
- Instruments: Vocals
- Labels: Hollywood; Universal Latino; 5020; Sony Latin
- Website: tinistoessel.com

Signature
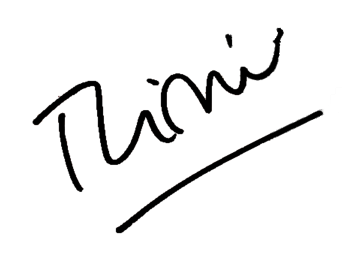

Martina Stoessel (Spanish: [maɾˈtina estoˈesel]; born 21 March 1997), known professionally as Tini, is an Argentine singer and actress. She began her career as a child actress, by appearing on the Argentine children's television series Patito Feo (2007). Tini rose to fame for her title role in the Disney Channel Latin America telenovela Violetta (2012–2015), which became an international success and established her as a teen idol. She achieved success on Latin American and European charts with multiple soundtracks, and reprised the character in the series' sequel film Tini: The Movie (2016).

In 2015, Tini became the first Argentine act to sign with Hollywood Records. She adopted her stage name and released her bilingual pop self-titled debut studio album (2016). The album debuted at number one in Argentina and reached the top ten in various European countries. After signing with Universal Music Latino, she explored Latin pop and reggae on Quiero Volver (2018), her second chart-topping album in Argentina. Tini re-calibrated her image from pop to reggaeton with the Latin trap-infused Tini Tini Tini (2020), which became the best-selling album by a woman in Argentina and the highest-certified female album, at double diamond, by the CAPIF. Shifting to Sony Music Latin and 5020 Records in 2021, she blended urbano and cumbia styles on Cupido (2023), which featured her first three Billboard Argentina Hot 100 number-ones: "Miénteme", "Bar", and "La Triple T". Certified diamond by the CAPIF, and double platinum (Latin) by the RIAA, the album was the first by an Argentine act in the 2020s decade to reach the top ten on the Billboard US Latin Pop Albums and top 50 on the US Top Latin Albums charts. It also made Tini the first Argentine woman to chart on the Billboard Global 200 and Global Excl. US. Themes of personal struggles and media scrutiny inspired the alternative pop album Un Mechón de Pelo (2024), which yielded the number-one single "Pa". Her guest appearance on "We Pray" in 2024 made her the first Argentine woman to appear on the US Billboard Hot 100.

Outside of music, Tini has played voice roles in dubbed versions of the animated films Monsters University (2013) and UglyDolls (2019). On television, she served as a judge and advisor on the Argentine (2018) and Spanish (2020) versions of The Voice, and lead the drama miniseries Breakdown (2025).

One of the best-selling Argentine music artists, Tini is among the highest-grossing Argentine touring acts, and is the second-most-streamed Argentine female act. Her accolades include five Gardel Awards, one Lo Nuestro Award, three Bravo Otto Awards, two Martín Fierro Awards, two Los 40 Music Awards, three MTV Millennial Awards, and two MTV Europe Music Awards. In 2016, Tini was named among The Hollywood Reporter's 25 Most Powerful Women in Global Television. From 2018 to 2020, she was named Billboard Argentina's "Artist of The Year" and was the most-streamed Argentine woman on Spotify for each year, consecutively. She was the first artist to sell out nine consecutive concerts at the Estadio Luna Park and six consecutive concerts at the Hipódromo Argentino de Palermo. In 2021, Tini was included in ¡Hola!'s list of Top 100 Latina Powerhouse women; from 2019 to 2022, she was named as one of the ten most influential women from Argentina. In 2025, she made it to the Madame Tussauds Hot 100 list, recognizing her as a Latin pop innovator.

== Early life and career beginnings ==
Stoessel was born in Buenos Aires, the daughter of Mariana Muzlera and television director and producer Alejandro Stoessel. She has a brother, Francisco, who is one year older than her. Stoessel began her artistic training at a young age studying singing, piano, musical comedy, musical theater, and dance in her native Buenos Aires. Stoessel was educated at two private bilingual schools: Colegio San Marcos and Colegio Martín y Omar de San Isidro.

In 2007, Stoessel had a role in the first season of the popular Argentine children's telenovela, Patito Feo, as "Martina", one of Fito Bernardi's assistants. She also played the role of "Anna" in a flashback episode in the same series. In 2011, Stoessel recorded the Spanish version of the Shannon Saunders' song, "The Glow", called "Tu Resplandor"; the song was included on the album, Disney Princess: Fairy Tale Songs. She performed the song at an event for Disney Channel Latin America called Celebratón on 31 December 2011. The song was later released on an album for the series in March 2012.

== Career ==
=== 2012–2014: Breakthrough with Violetta ===
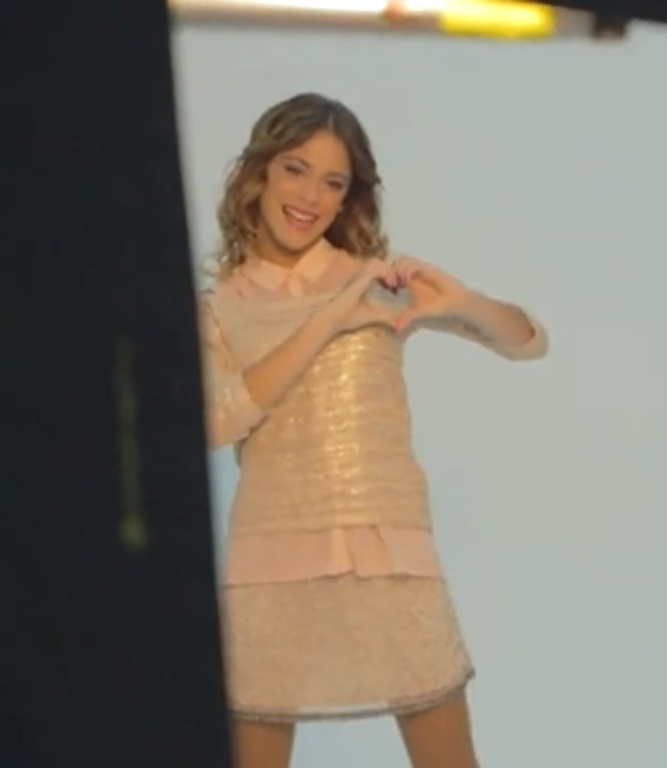
Stoessel at a photoshoot for Violetta season 2 in 2013

Stoessel's father presented an unrelated project to Disney Channel producers, who later informed him about auditions for the lead role for the network's upcoming television series, Violetta. In late 2011, after an intense casting process, Stoessel obtained the principal role in the series, a tween-oriented musical series developed as a co-production between Disney Channel Latin America, Europe, Middle East and Africa. The show's first season began production in Buenos Aires in 2012. Stoessel played the titular character, Violetta Castillo, during all three seasons of the show. She sang the series' theme song, "En Mi Mundo", which was later released as a single on 5 April 2012 to promote the show. The song appeared on the first Violetta soundtrack album, which was released in June 2012. Subsequently, she recorded the Italian version, "Nel Mio Mondo" and the English version, "In My Own World". For the role, Stoessel won an award for "Female Newcomer" in the 2012 edition of the Kids' Choice Awards Argentina and was also nominated for the U.S. version, the Nickelodeon Kids' Choice Awards, in the category "Favorite Latin Artist".

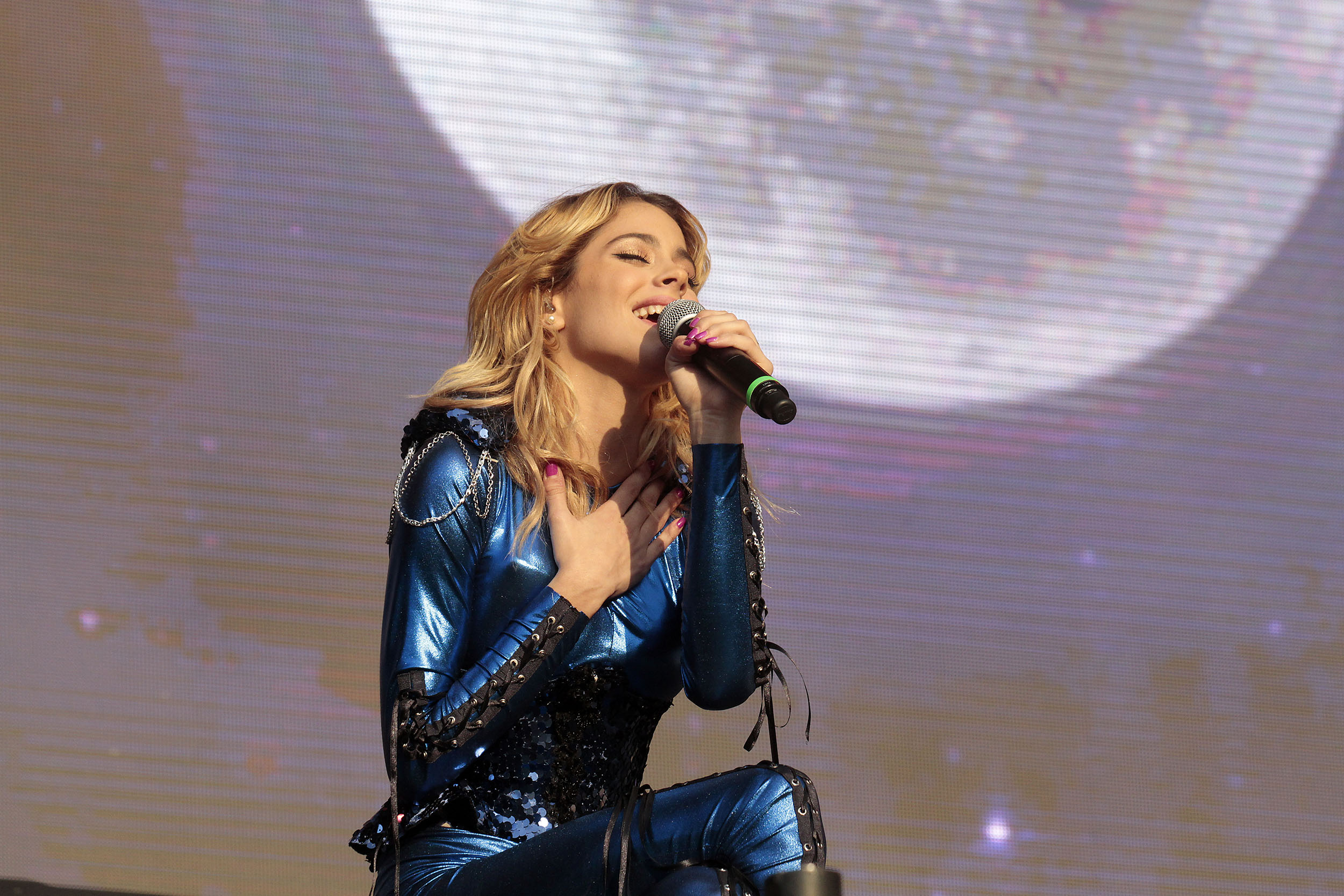
Stoessel performing at the Juntada Tinista event in Buenos Aires, in May 2014

From July 2013 to March 2014, Stoessel and the cast of Violetta embarked on their first concert tour, Violetta en Vivo, visiting Latin America and Europe, in support of the series and its albums. It became one of the highest-grossing concert tours among South American acts and in 2014, grossing over US$17.5 million and selling over 1.7 million tickets across 50 reported shows of 200 shows. Stoessel appeared on the third Violetta soundtrack album, Hoy somos más, released in June 2013. On 10 August 2013, she performed, along with the cast of Violetta, at the UNICEF television charity event Un sol para los chicos, where she sang the songs, "Ser Mejor" and "En Mi Mundo". In 2013, she recorded "Libre Soy" and "All'Alba Sorgerò", the Latin American Spanish and Italian versions of the pop version of "Let It Go", the closing credits song from the Disney animated film Frozen. These versions of the song were used in the film's ending credits in US. In November 2013, Stoessel was included in the fourth Violetta soundtrack, Violetta en Vivo. It features songs from the first two seasons of Violetta, and songs from the Violetta en Vivo tour.

Stoessel also participated in the television programs The U-Mix Show and Disney Planet for Disney Channel Latin America. In 2014, she voiced a brief role for the Italian dubbed version of the Disney animated film Monsters University. In May 2014, Stoessel released her first book, a co-authored biography called "Simplemente Tini", about her upbringing and eventual rise to international popularity. That same month, she held a free musical concert near the Monument to the Carta Magna and Four Regions of Argentina, organised by the city government of Buenos Aires, under the slogan "Cuidemos el planeta". The fifth Violetta soundtrack, Gira mi canción was released on 18 July 2014, featuring Stoessel on several tracks. All Violetta soundtrack albums went platinum or higher; Mashable called them "the brightest and bubbliest pop [soundtracks] you'll ever hear". In September 2014, Stoessel performed at a charity football match Partido Interreligioso por la Paz, convened by Pope Francis at the Stadio Olimpico in Rome where she sang "Nel Mio Mondo" and the cover version of John Lennon's song "Imagine".

Violetta became one of the most successful non-American and non-English-language Disney projects. It was broadcast across over 140 countries and dubbed in 15 languages. Having expanded to music, touring, and merchandising, over 3 million soundtrack albums, 3 million books, and 1 million diaries were sold globally. According to Disney, Violetta was one of its five most successful franchises in Europe at the time. Financial Times stated that it had become a "significant franchise in the intellectual property portfolio [owned by Disney]" and a "global property" despite not airing on linear television in the United States. Variety cited the series and its success as one of the factors for turning TV "into the company's most powerful brand ambassador". Mashable named it one of the best Disney programs by Latino creators.

=== 2015–2017: Tini: The Movie and musical solo debut ===
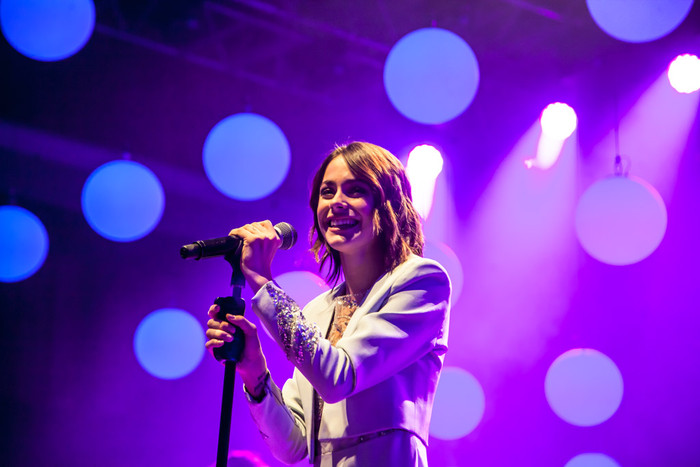
Stoessel performing at La Usina in 2016

Stoessel reprised her titular role and co-starred with some of the Violetta cast members in the film Tini: The Movie (also known as Tini: The New Life of Violetta), the sequel to the series. Production began in October 2015 and ended in mid-December 2015, where the movie filmed in various international locations, including Sicily, Cádiz, Madrid, and Buenos Aires. A teaser trailer featuring scenes from the movie was released in late December 2015. Billboard described the film as "a fictionalised portrayal of Stoessel's real life Disney-assisted coming of age story". It had its world premiere in late April in Paris and was theatrically released in May and June in various Latin American and European countries. It was to be released in Argentina on 14 July 2016, but was released earlier on 2 June 2016. Tini: The Movie grossed over US$17 million worldwide, debuted in fourth place at the box office in Spain, and was released on Netflix in February 2017. The film was released to Disney+ in the United States in February 2023. It was filmed in between concert stops for the television series' final international tour called Violetta Live, which ran from 3 January to 1 November 2015. With 145 shows across Latin America and Europe, it grossed over US$76.8 million and sold nearly 1.5 million tickets, based on 50 reported dates. Violetta Live became the world's 15th-highest-grossing tour, the highest-grossing-tour by a Latin act, and the highest-grossing tour by a non-English-language act in 2015. As of 2024, it is one of the highest-grossing Latin tours of all time. On 21 August 2015, it was announced that Stoessel had signed a recording deal with Hollywood Records to release her own solo material under the newly adopted stage name "Tini", (stylised in all caps). She became the first Argentine act in history to sign with the label.

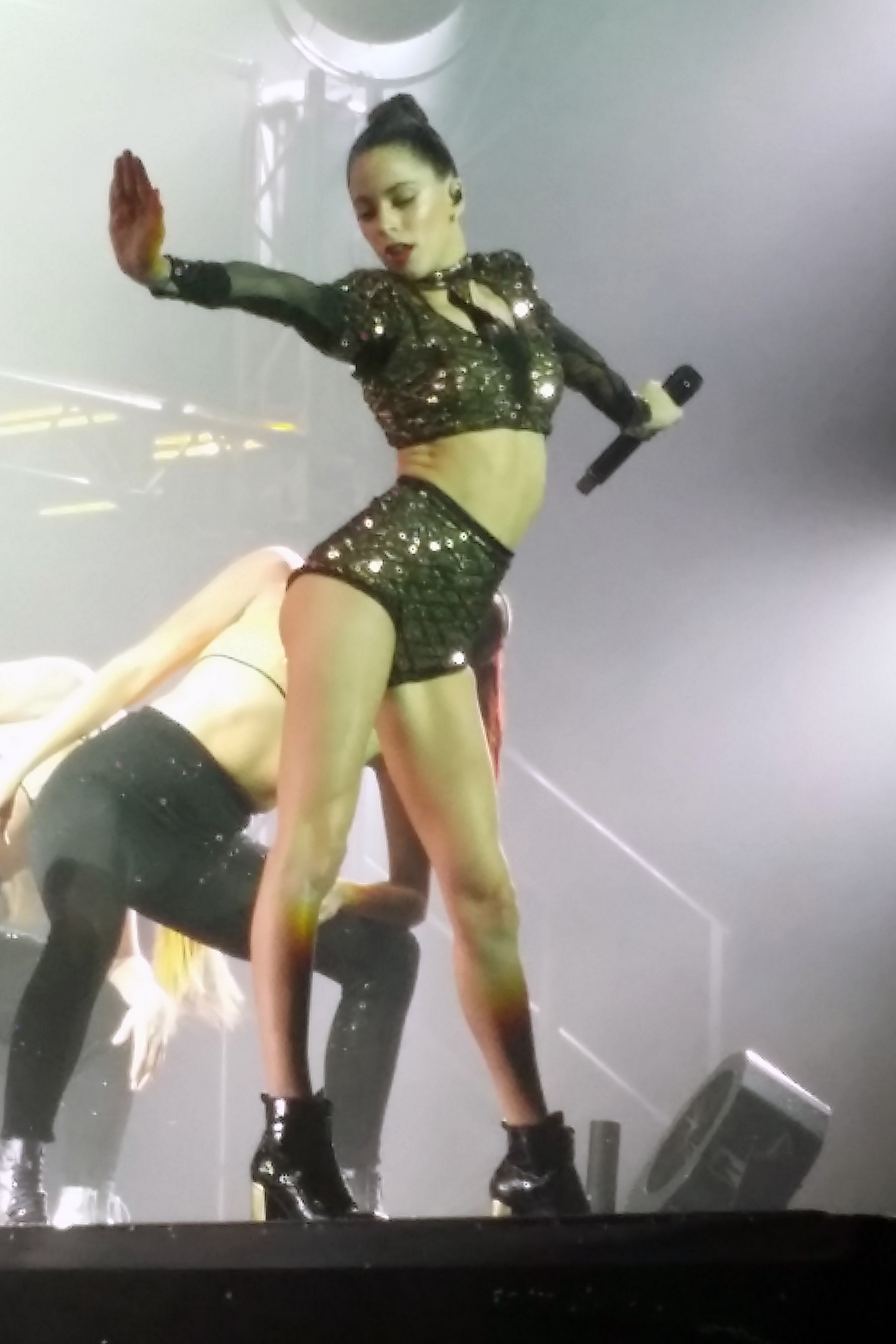
Stoessel performing on her Got Me Started Tour in 2017

From January 2016 to early March 2016 she recorded her debut album in Los Angeles, California. Her debut studio album, Tini (Martina Stoessel), was released worldwide on digital and physical formats on 29 April 2016. The record is a double album: one disc serves as the soundtrack for Tini: The Movie whilst the other is Stoessel's solo album of Spanish and English-language pop songs. "Siempre Brillarás" was released on 25 March, with the pre-order purchase of her debut album, as the lead single to promote the release of Tini: The Movie. The song was also recorded in English and was released under the title, "Born to Shine". The music video for "Siempre Brillarás", featuring scenes from Tini: The Movie, was released on 25 March 2016. The music video for the soundtrack's second promotional single, "Losing the Love", was released on 6 May 2016, and its music video included clips from the film. Stoessel performed songs from her debut album at her first showcase as a solo artist at La Usina del Arte in Buenos Aires on 12 June 2016. The showcase was filmed and broadcast on her official YouTube channel from 22 to 28 August 2016. On 24 June 2016, Stoessel released her second solo single, "Great Escape", along with the Spanish-language version of the song, "Yo Me Escaparé". The music video for "Great Escape" was filmed in Buenos Aires and later released on 8 July 2016. On 14 October 2016, Stoessel released the deluxe edition of her debut album, which includes "Yo Me Escaparé" and the Spanish-language version of the song "Got Me Started", "Ya No Hay Nadie Que Nos Pare", with vocals from Colombian singer Sebastián Yatra. Stoessel released "Got Me Started", along with "Ya No Hay Nadie Que Nos Pare", as her third solo single to coincide with the release of the deluxe edition of her album. The music video for "Got Me Started" was released on 8 December 2016, while the video for "Ya No Hay Nadie Que Nos Pare" was released on 19 January 2017. Stoessel's fourth solo single, "Si Tu Te Vas", was released on 4 May 2017, alongside the music video for the song. On 18 March 2017, Stoessel began her first solo concert tour, Got Me Started Tour, starting from Europe and then heading on to Latin America. The tour was listed as the highest-grossing tour of 2017 in Argentina, and on Pollstar's "2017 Mid-Top 100 Worldwide Tours" list. In the summer of 2017, Stoessel guest starred as herself in two episodes of the second season of Disney Channel Latin America telenovela series, Soy Luna. In June, Stoessel was featured on "Todo Es Posible", a collaboration with Spanish singer David Bisbal for the Tad Jones: The Hero Returns movie soundtrack. In July, she was featured on "It's a Lie", a track from The Vamps's third studio album Night & Day, and she also appeared alongside fellow artist and the Voz Por La Paz foundation patron Odino Faccia on the world peace anthem, "Somos El Cambio", which was written by the former President of the United States, Barack Obama; the song was first performed at the Red Voz Por La Paz ceremony the previous year.

=== 2018–2020: Quiero Volver and Tini Tini Tini ===
The collaboration between Stoessel and Venezuelan singer Nacho titled "Te Quiero Más" was released on 13 October 2017 as the lead single from her second album. In December 2017, Stoessel made a guest appearance as herself in an episode of the telenovela Las Estrellas, and she was featured in a remix of "Lights Down Low" by MAX, titled "Latin Mix". On 6 April 2018, Stoessel released "Princesa", a duet with Karol G, as the second single from her second album. The single became Stoessel's first single to top the national chart in Argentina. Also, the single reached US Latin Airplay and US Latin Pop charts. On 22 June 2018, Stoessel released "Consejo de Amor", featuring Colombian folk-rock band Morat, as the third single from her second album. On 26 July 2018, Stoessel was featured alongside Flo Rida on a remix of Álvaro Soler's hit single "La Cintura". In August 2018, it was announced that Stoessel had joined La Voz... Argentina as a coach for the reality competition show's second season; Stoessel is the youngest judge on any incarnation of The Voice franchise. On 3 August 2018, Stoessel released "Quiero Volver", a duet with Sebastián Yatra, as the fourth single from her second album. On 24 August 2018, Stoessel was featured alongside Colombian singer Greeicy in a remix of the song "Lo malo" by Spanish singers Aitana and Ana Guerra.

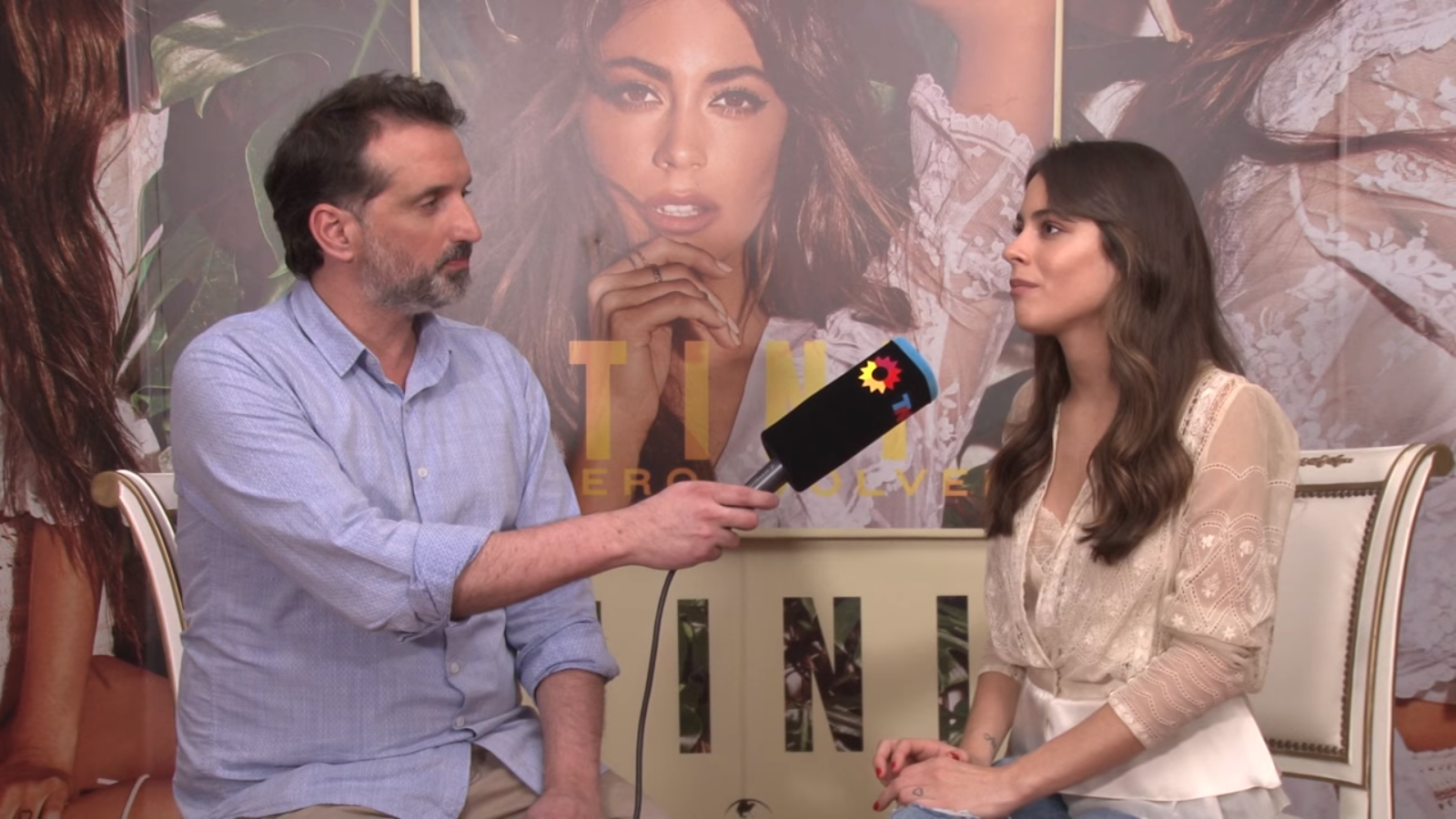
Stoessel in interview for Todo Noticias in 2018

In September 2018, Stoessel announced her second concert tour, Quiero Volver Tour, that began on 13 December 2018 at Estadio Luna Park in Buenos Aires. Stoessel's second album titled Quiero Volver was released on 12 October 2018. On 2 November 2018, Stoessel released "Por Que Te Vas", a collaboration with Cali y El Dandee, as the fifth single from her second album. In the same month, she was featured alongside Chelcee Grimes and Jhay Cortez on "Wild", the song from Jonas Blue's debut album Blue, released as a single in February 2019. Stoessel voiced Moxy in the Spanish dubbed version of the animated musical comedy film UglyDolls, released in May 2019.

In May 2019, it was announced that Stoessel had joined the reality talent show Pequeños Gigantes Argentina as a judge. The collaboration between Stoessel and Greeicy titled "22" was released on 3 May 2019 as the first single from Stoessel's third album. The song peaked at number eight on Argentina Hot 100 and became Stoessel's first top-ten single on the chart. On 14 June 2019, Stoessel was featured on "Sad Song", a collaboration with Swedish DJ Alesso. On 26 July 2019, Stoessel released "Suéltate el Pelo" as the second single from her third album, as well as part of promotion for Pantene. On 6 September 2019, Stoessel released "Fresa", a collaboration with Colombian singer Lalo Ebratt, as the third single from her third album. The song peaked at number three on Argentina Hot 100, becoming Stoessel's first top-five single on the chart. On 11 October 2019, Stoessel released "Oye", a duet with Sebastián Yatra, as the fourth single from her third album. The song debuted at number three on Argentina Hot 100, becoming Stoessel's second top-five single on the chart in a row. The single became the third song in the history of the chart to achieve a debut at No. 3, and made Stoessel the only female to debut two songs in the top-5 on the AR Hot chart. On 10 January 2020, Stoessel released "Recuerdo", a collaboration with Venezuelan duo Mau y Ricky, as the fifth single from her third album.

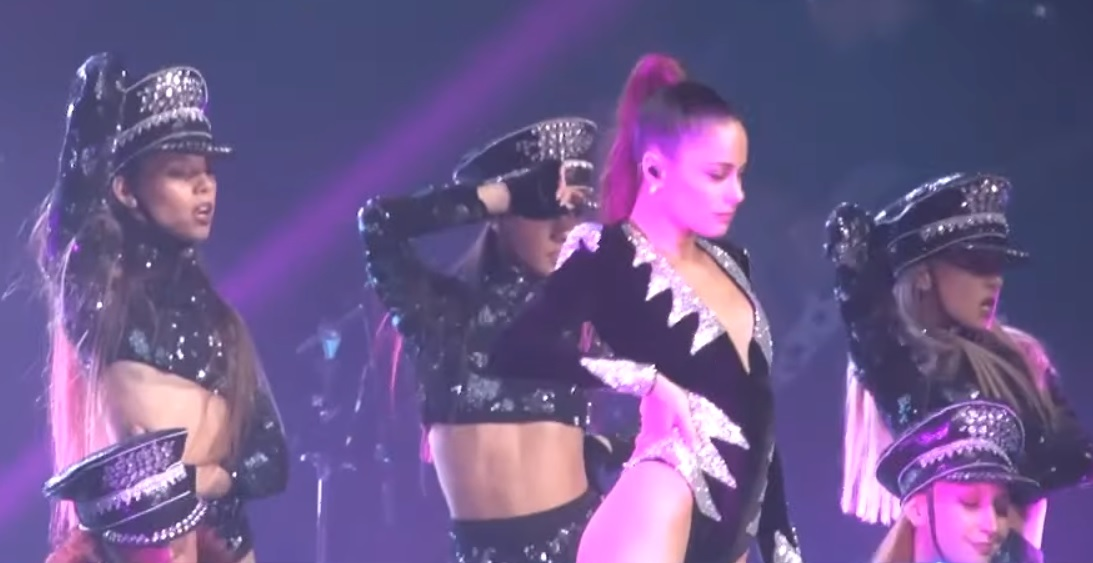
Stoessel performing on her Quiero Volver Tour in Punta del Este

The collaboration between Stoessel and Colombian producer Ovy on the Drums titled "Ya No Me Llames" was released on 25 March 2020. In May 2020, Stoessel released, in collaboration with YouTube, a two-part docuseries titled Tini Quiero Volver Tour. It shows behind the scenes and concert footage from Stoessel's Quiero Volver Tour, and follows her professional life during the tour. The series debuted on 22 May 2020. Stoessel appeared alongside Dutch DJ and producer R3hab and Mexican pop rock band Reik in a song titled "Bésame (I Need You)", released on 5 June 2020. On 15 July 2020, Stoessel appeared alongside fellow trap artist Khea on "Ella Dice", the sixth single from her third album. The song peaked at number four on Argentina Hot 100, becoming Stoessel's third top-five single on the chart. On 3 September 2020, Stoessel appeared alongside Lola Índigo on the remix of María Becerra's song titled "High". The remix peaked at number two on Argentina Hot 100, becoming Stoessel's fourth top-five single on the chart.

On 24 September 2020, Stoessel released "Duele", featuring trap artist John C, as the seventh single from her third album. The song peaked at number ten on Argentina Hot 100, becoming Stoessel's sixth top-ten single on the chart. In October 2020, Stoessel served as a key advisor on the Spanish version of The Voice for its seventh season. On 29 October 2020, Stoessel appeared alongside Alejandro Sanz on "Un Beso en Madrid", the eighth single from her third album. On 16 November 2020, Stoessel announced that her third album would be titled Tini Tini Tini and it would be released on 3 December 2020. Stoessel made history, having received a double diamond certification for the album. The album was also listed at Top 5 Most Listened To Albums Worldwide on Spotify Charts. The day of the album's release, Stoessel released "Te Olvidaré" as the ninth single. On 6 December 2020, Stoessel performed in a livestream concert titled "Tini Tini Tini Live", in collaboration with Claro, where she sang various songs from her third album. It was also reported that Stoessel would star alongside Sebastián Yatra in a Disney+ streaming television series titled It Was Always Me. On 24 December 2020, it was announced that Stoessel and Yatra have left the series pre-production, with their respective roles being taken over by Karol Sevilla and Pipe Bueno.

=== 2021–2023: Cupido ===
In early 2021, Tini signed with Sony Music Latin. "Miénteme", a collaboration with María Becerra, was released on 29 April 2021 as the lead single from Tini's fourth studio album. The second collaboration between both artists, following the remix of Becerra's single "High", it debuted at number 75 on the Argentina Hot 100. The song went viral on streaming services and reached the summit the following week, marking the biggest jump to the top spot in the chart's history. It became Tini's first number-one in Argentina and spent six consecutive weeks atop the chart. "Miénteme" also debuted on the Billboard Global 200 and Global Excl. US charts at numbers 65 and 62, making her and Becerra the first Argentine female artists to appear on both charts. The song was eventually certified diamond in Argentina, seven-times platinum in Spain, and quadruple platinum in Colombia and Mexico. It became 2021's most-streamed song in Argentina, most-consumed song in the country by a native artist, and fourth-most-watched music video by an Argentine act; Tini was the fifth-most-streamed Argentine artist that year. In June 2021, she appeared alongside rapper Duki on the remix of musical duo MYA's song "2:50"; it peaked at number three on the Argentina Hot 100. Tini teamed up with Spanish singers Lola Índigo and Belinda on "La Niña de la Escuela", released on 2 July 2021 as the seventh single from the Índigo's album La Niña. The song reached number nine in Spain. Her next collaboration was "Maldita Foto" with Colombian singer Manuel Turizo, released in August as the second single from her fourth album. The song peaked within the top 15 in Argentina and on the US Latin Pop Airplay chart. On 1 October 2021, Tini and Venezuelan singer Danny Ocean released the song "Tú No Me Conoces". On 30 October 2021, she held a one-off concert at the Costanera de Posadas in Posadas, with Lola Índigo and rapper Khea as guests; it was attended by over 100,000 people, breaking the record for the biggest audience for a ticketed concert by a woman in Argentina. It bolstered an economic movement of over 34 million Argentine pesos for the province. On 11 November 2021, Tini released "Bar", a collaboration with rapper L-Gante, as the third single from her fourth album.

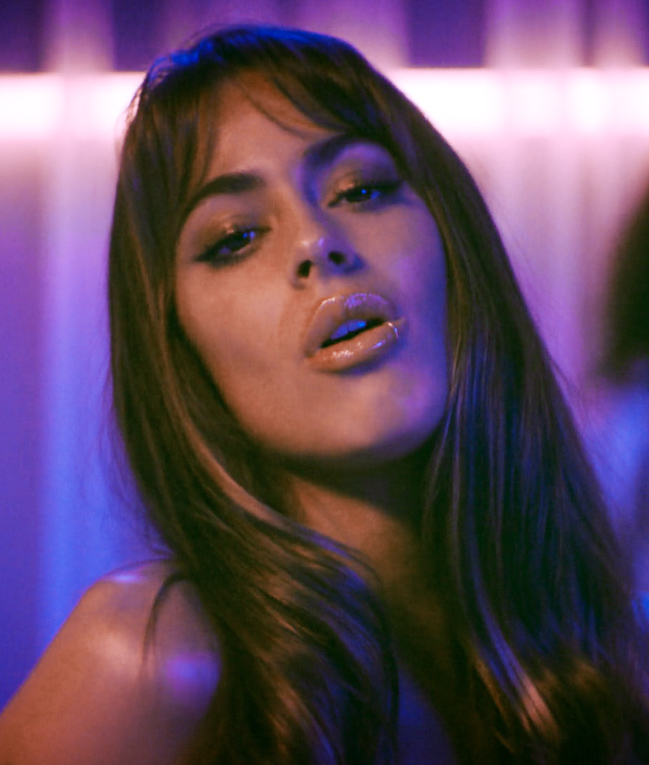
Stoessel in the "Bar" music video

"Bar" reached number one on the Argentina Hot 100 and spent seven consecutive weeks atop the chart, becoming her second and longest-running number-one in Argentina. Tini contributed to the soundtrack of the animated film Koati with a song titled "Vueltas en Tu Mente", released on 26 November 2021. She told Glamour Mexico that her fourth studio effort would comprise several collaborations, and experiment with various musical genres and elements. She also revealed that she had filmed a Chinese period drama film titled The Diary, directed by Jackie Chan, and that its release was delayed due to the COVID-19 pandemic. Production for The Diary concluded in 2018; the release was previously slated for 2020. On 9 December 2021, Tini released the song "Aquí Estoy" as a collaboration with Pantene; its music video featured the winners of an online challenge titled after the single and coincided with her promotional livestream concert, the Aquí Estoy Show.

On 17 February 2022, she released "Fantasi", a collaboration with singer Beéle, as the fourth single from her fourth album. The song peaked at number six in Argentina. On 5 May 2022, Tini released "La Triple T", the fifth single off her fourth album. The song reached number one on the Argentine Hot 100, following its debut at number 53—logging the second-biggest jump to the top spot in chart history, after her own "Miénteme". Topping the chart for five consecutive weeks, it became her third number-one single in Argentina and her first as a solo act. On 19 May, Tini released "Carne y Hueso" as the sixth single from her upcoming album. The song reached the top 15 in Argentina. In support of Tini Tini Tini and her forthcoming album, she embarked on the Tini Tour, which started on 20 May 2022 in Buenos Aires, Argentina, and ended on 5 November 2023 in Los Angeles, California. It was Tini's first tour to visit the United States. The tour helped her become the first female act in history to sell out and perform six shows at the Hipódromo Argentino. The tour was preceded by a series of music festival concerts by Tini in Argentina, Chile, and Bolivia. Two shows from the concert cycle—the 28 May and 23 December 2022 shows at Hipódromo Argentino de Palermo and Campo Argentino de Polo in Buenos Aires—were broadcast and released as concert films on Star+ in Latin America and Disney+ in other regions. The former marked the first-ever performance to be aired live by Disney for Latin America and the United States simultaneously. Tini collaborated with Christina Aguilera on the song "Suéltame", released on 30 May 2022 as the lead single from the latter's EP La Tormenta and the fourth single from the album Aguilera. It peaked at number 23 on the US Latin Pop Airplay chart. In July and September, Tini released "La Loto" with Becky G and Anitta, and "El Último Beso" with Tiago PZK as the seventh and eighth singles from her fourth album. Both songs debuted and peaked at number seven in Argentina. "La Loto" became Tini's first top-ten entry on the US Latin Pop Airplay chart, peaking at number eight. She was featured on the song "Un Reel" from Ozuna's album Ozutochi, released on 7 October 2022. On 14 October 2022, Tini appeared alongside María Becerra, Greeicy, and Becky G on a remix of Elena Rose's song "La Ducha". She appeared alongside some of the cast members of Violetta in a Disney+ special celebrating the show's tenth anniversary, Solo Amor y mil Canciones (English: Just Love and a Thousand Songs), released on 8 December 2022.

On 12 January 2023, Tini released "Muñecas", a collaboration with rapper La Joaqui and American DJ Steve Aoki, as the ninth single from her fourth album. Peaking at number three in Argentina, the song was also featured on Aoki's album Hiroquest 2: Double Helix (2023). On 26 January, she announced her fourth studio album, and first with Sony Music Latin, Cupido, on the Spanish talk show El Hormiguero. The day after, Mexican singer Christian Nodal's "Por el Resto de Tu Vida" featuring Tini, the lead single of his EP Forajido 2, was released. It peaked within the top 15 on Billboard Latin Pop Airplay. On 14 February, Tini released Cupido's title track as the tenth and final single off the parent album. The song reached number three in Argentina. It also became her best-performing song on the Billboard Global 200 Excl. US chart, peaking at number thirty-two; and reached the top seventy of the Global 200. Cupido was released on 16 February 2023. Primarily a cumbia and urbano record, it fuses elements of reggaeton and electronica. The album was well received by critics; Valentina Cardo of Fame wrote that "Tini fuses her excellent vocal talent and song composition [...] all while showcasing her essence" and "[with each track] shares her heart". Cupido debuted at number three on the Argentine Albums chart, becoming Tini's fourth consecutive top-five entry in Argentina. Additionally, it debuted at number eight and forty-five on the Billboard Latin Pop Albums and Top Latin Albums charts in the US, with 2,000 album-equivalent units. This feat made Tini the first Argentine act since Miguel Caló in 2016; and the first Argentine woman since Soledad Pastorutti in 2014 to debut an album in the top ten of the former chart. The tracks "Te Pido" and "Las Jordans" charted within the top 60 in Argentina. Cupido and its title track were certified triple and quadruple platinum (Latin) in the US by the RIAA in August 2025. The album was certified diamond in Argentina, triple-platinum in Colombia and Peru, and platinum in Chile, Mexico, and Spain in 2024.

Following the release of Cupido, Tini released a string of collaborations throughout 2023. The first of these, "Me Enteré" with Tiago PZK, was released on 18 May 2023. Their second collaboration, after "El Último Beso" (2022), it reached number six in Argentina. On 8 September 2023, Tini appeared as a guest performer during Lola Índigo's concert at Plaza Mayor in Valladolid, Spain. She then appeared alongside rapper BM in producer Big One's "Lágrimas", released on 10 October. Peaking at number six, it marked her 17th top-ten in Argentina. Tini's final release of 2023 was "La Original" with Emilia, released on 2 November as the fifth single from the latter's second studio album, .MP3. The song debuted at number one on the Argentina Hot 100 and topped the chart for seven weeks, marking Tini's fourth leader and tying "Bar" as her longest-running chart-topper. "La Original" peaked at number three on the Billboard US Latin Pop Airplay, becoming her highest-peaking song on the chart.

=== 2024–present: Un Mechón de Pelo, Breakdown, and sixth studio album ===
In April 2023, Tini revealed via her social media that she had begun work on her next studio album with longtime producers Andrés Torres and Mauricio Rengifo. She told El Diario La Prensa in November 2023 that the new material was "different" from her past work and originated from her personal struggles, delivering the message that "it is never too late to speak". Tini's fifth studio album, Un Mechón de Pelo, was released on 11 April 2024. It is her first album with no collaborations. Described by Billboard as her "most personal project yet", it is a concept album whose subject matter details her struggles with mental health, family, media scrutiny, child stardom, and her celebrity. Primarily an alternative pop and spoken word record, the album experiments with minimal music, pop rock, contemporary R&B, and electronica, featuring elements of storytelling; it is a sonic departure from the urbano and cumbia-dominated sound of its predecessor Cupido. Tini had another album "almost ready" but shelved it in late 2023 in favour of Un Mechón de Pelo, which she majorly conceived during the Tini Tour. Developed and recorded within six months, it was described as the "quickest album of her career". The opening track "Pa" was released on 1 April 2024 as the album's lead single and peaked at number one in Argentina, marking Tini's fifth chart-topper. It was followed by "Posta" and "Buenos Aires" as subsequent singles on 4 and 9 April; the latter reached number eight in Argentina. Four tracks from the album charted on the Argentina Hot 100, of which two appeared in the top 40.

Tini joined Emilia onstage on 19 April and 13 October at the Movistar Arena and José Amalfitani Stadium shows of her .MP3 Tour to perform "La Original". She conducted a series of five concerts from 27 April to 3 May, to promote Un Mechón de Pelo, at the Hurlingham Club in Buenos Aires. Two specials based on the concerts and the album were released; one aired on Flow—and was released via its streaming service—on 6 May, while the other was released on Disney+ and Star+ on 10 May. On 30 May, "Agua" featuring Tini was released as the final single from the duo Ca7riel & Paco Amoroso's album Baño María; the song won them Collaboration of the Year at the 27th Annual Gardel Awards. On 31 July, Tini released the live album Un Mechón de Pelo (En Vivo), recorded during her Hurlingham Club concerts. On 23 August, "We Pray" featuring Little Simz, Burna Boy, Elyanna, and Tini was released as the second single from the Coldplay album Moon Music (2024); an alternative version featuring her vocals in Spanish was released on 6 September. On 29 August, she and the song's other featured artists joined Coldplay onstage at their Croke Park show in Dublin to perform the track. A special based on the performance and focused on Tini and Coldplay as collaborators was released on 11 September on Flow. "We Pray" marked Tini's first appearance on multiple international charts; it reached the top 40 in various European regions, and the top 20 on the UK singles chart and Billboard's US Adult Pop Airplay and Hot Rock & Alternative Songs charts. It became her highest-charting song on the Global 200, peaking at number 50, and her first chart entry on the US Billboard Hot 100 and Canadian Hot 100, reaching numbers 87 and 92, respectively. She became the first Argentine female artist to appear on the Hot 100 in the chart's history. Tini performed the song with Coldplay and Elyanna on the 5 October 2024 episode of Saturday Night Live, on Today, and at an exclusive SiriusXM concert, becoming the first Argentine female musician to perform on mainstream American television and radio. On 9 October, she made a surprise appearance during Colombian band Morat's concert at José Amalfitani Stadium to perform their 2018 collaboration "Consejo de Amor".

Tini's first release of 2025 was "Lo Que Me Causa" with Milo J. The two debuted the track on 19 January at his Movistar Arena show in Madrid; it was released on 23 January and reached the top 40 in Argentina. In March, she appeared alongside Emilia and Nicki Nicole on "Blackout", which topped the Argentina Hot 100 for two weeks as her sixth number-one. On 6 May 2025, Tini appeared alongside electropop band Miranda! on "Me Gusta", the final single from their album Nuevo Hotel Miranda!., it debuted at number eight in Argentina. On 16 May, she was featured on Canadian musician JP Saxe's "Strangers", the lead single from his extended play Make Yourself At Home. Tini made a surprise appearance at Lola Índigo's Metropolitano Stadium concert in Madrid on 14 June. On 26 and 27 July, she appeared as a guest and performed "We Pray" alongside Coldplay—at Hard Rock Stadium—on the Miami shows of their tour.

Tini starred in the leading role in the mystery drama miniseries Breakdown, opposite Jorge López and Martín Barba, which premiered on 15 August 2025 on Disney+. She played Miranda Senguinetti, a pianist who, in an attempt to trace and learn about her biological family and background, infiltrates a criminal organization. The Argentine-Mexican production marked her first live-action acting role in over nine years. Tini's performance earned her a nomination for Best Lead Actress in a Series at the 2025 Martín Fierro Awards. In September, she appeared on "Hasta Que Me Enamoro" with María Becerra, their third collaboration, which reached number three in Argentina. Tini conducted her own nine-date music festival Futttura, from 25 October to 16 November, at Tecnópolis in Buenos Aires. It was preceded by a free open-air concert in Buenos Aires on 3 April 2025. The show on 8 November 2025 was livestreamed and later released on Disney+ as the concert film Tini en Vivo: Futttura. The festival was succeeded by the Futttura World Tour, comprising 30 arena and stadium shows across Latin America, the US, and Spain from February 2026 to January 2027. In November and December 2025, Tini appeared at Tiago PZK, Becerra's and Miranda!'s concerts at the Movistar Arena, Estadio Monumental and the Estadio Ferro Carril Oeste, in Buenos Aires, and performed her collaborations with them. In March 2026, Tini appeared alongside the Mexican musical group Los Ángeles Azules on the reworked version of Ricky Martin's 1998 song "Vuelve". On 5 May 2026, she appeared at the Jonas Brothers' Movistar Arena show in Buenos Aires and performed "This is Me" and "Cupido" with the band. On 20 August 2026, Tini released her second collaboration with Los Ángeles Azules titled "Pa' Él".

Her sixth studio album is slated for release later this year. The lead single, "El Cielo", was released on 5 December 2024, debuting at number five on the Argentina Hot 100. Tini and Beéle released "Universidad", their second collaboration and the second single from the album, on 19 June 2025; it also reached the top five. The subsequent singles followed through the rest of 2025: "De Papel" in August, "Una Noche Más" and "Down" in October, and "36 Vidas" in December. On 19 March 2026, Tini released the album's seventh single "Dos Amantes", a collaboration with Ulises Bueno. The song's music video featured cameos from Lionel Messi, Susana Giménez, Rubén Deicas, and Rodrigo De Paul.

== Artistry ==
=== Musical style ===
While working on Violetta, Stoessel met with pop music and Latin music. She later transferred the pop sound to her first solo album Tini (Martina Stoessel). As Stoessel matured, her follow-up record, Quiero Volver, was described as an evolution to a new sound exploring the more serious sound of Latin music. Stoessel expanded with genres that are common to her home country such as reggaeton, cumbia, urban and trap sound, on her third studio album Tini Tini Tini, which she praised for having "a lot of variety and all kinds of sounds". The Latin music elements are also present, as well as integrates elements and heavy influences of electronica, in her fourth studio album Cupido, which she described as "An era full of growth and personal discovery." In addition, Stoessel is also recognizable by her romantic ballads and said, "I don't wake up every day feeling any one way. I don't want to do the same thing every day. I don't listen to the same kind of music, or even the same kind of genre, every day. So when it comes to recording music, I do different things. I'm always changing, evolving. Some days I want to write a ballad, others I want to work on a reggaeton song. I wanted to break apart these ideas that if you write and sing ballads, you can't do much else."

Stoessel has also been influenced by her Argentine heritage, which was a major inspiration to her, for use in the poem with tango, on her third album and explained, "In Argentina we listen to cumbia a lot, and on "22" we did a fusion of cumbia and reggaeton, and it was the very first song I released from this album. And, "Duele" is very similar because tango is something that represents Argentina and all Argentines. The song is a fusion of tango and trap, which I had not done before. Those two songs represent the Argentine heritage."

=== Influences ===
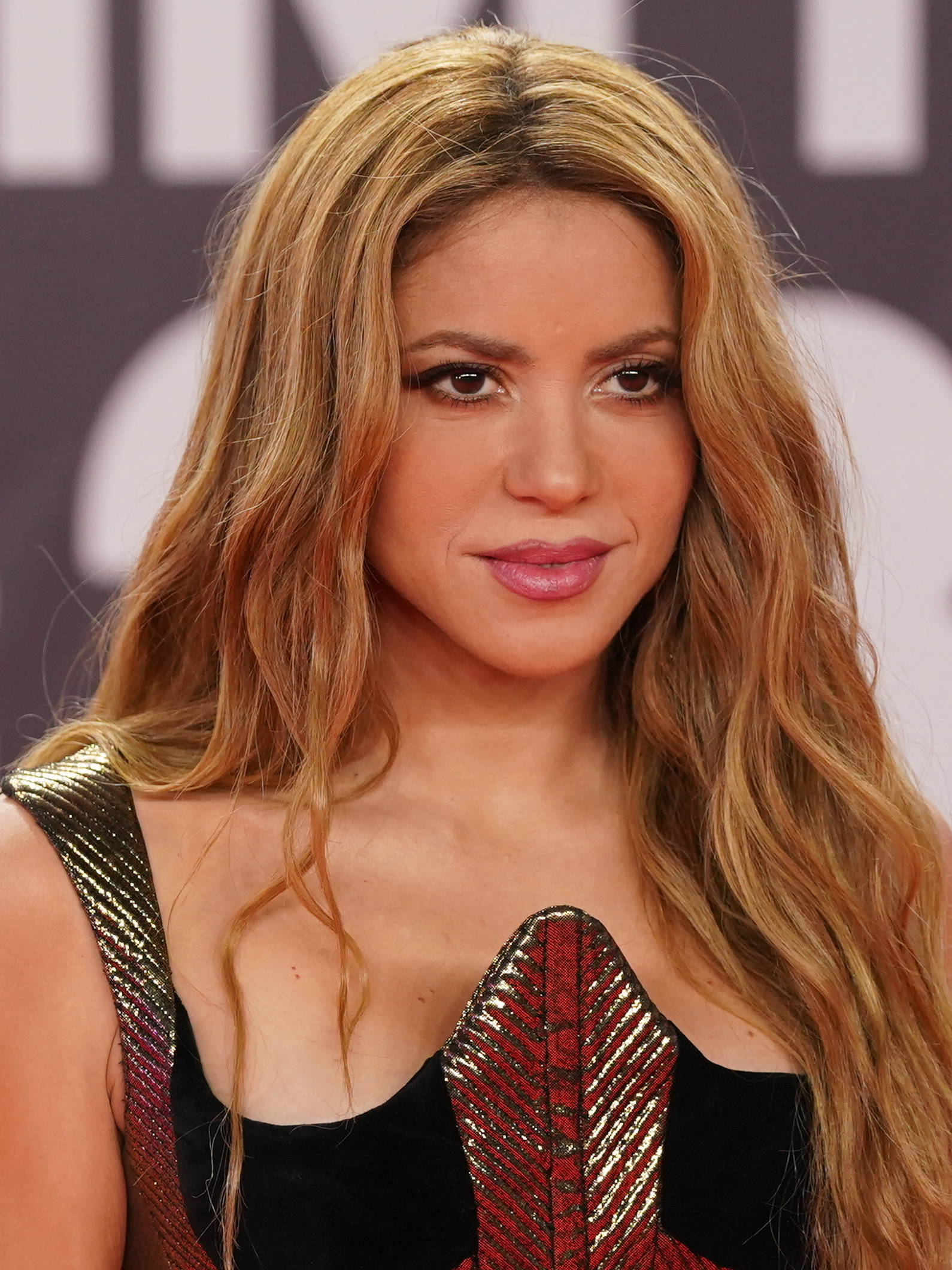
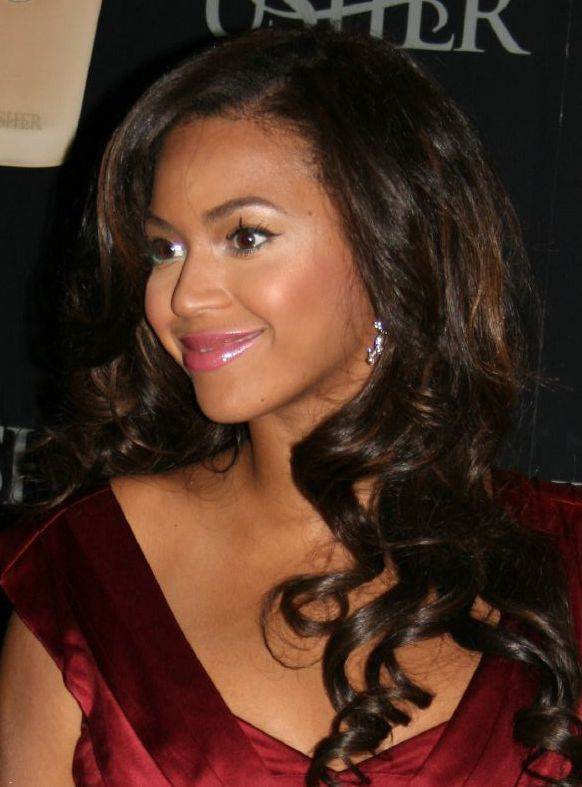
Shakira (left) and Beyoncé (right) are two of Stoessel's biggest influences in music.

Even before her career was launched by Disney, and even more because of that, Stoessel was already a fan and was inspired throughout her career by Miley Cyrus, Demi Lovato and Selena Gomez, who, like her, were successful protagonists on Disney Channel and later forayed into the music industry. She was also questioned by the media if she would follow the same path – sometimes controversial – as some of them, to which she stated that each one does what they like and follows their own road; she would not follow the same path as other Disney stars.

As Stoessel grew in her profession as a singer, she also found other inspirations. Her biggest influences according to Billboard are Beyoncé, Justin Bieber and Shakira. In 2019, in a cover story for the Mexican edition of Seventeen, when asked which was the biggest of them, Stoessel replied: "Beyoncé! She's awesome, I love her. I love everything she does, her music, her shows are amazing, how she dances [...] I like that you can see how she is present in the smallest details." This was already confirmed in previous years through her visual style (she worked with stylist Paula Selby Avellaneda, who had worked with Beyoncé), live performances and choreographies. Stoessel further cited Beyoncé as the person who she would like to collaborate with the most and also called the singer her "favourite artist": "She has inspired my career." Stoessel has praised Spanish musician Alejandro Sanz, with whom she collaborated on the 2020 pop ballad "Un Beso en Madrid", which she described as a "dream come true", and Puerto Rican musician Daddy Yankee, who she cited as a "teacher", stating that collaborating with him would be a "dream"; she grew up listening to both artists and stated them as her influences in hispanic music.

== Personal life ==
Tini resides in San Isidro, Buenos Aires. Due to the expansion of her music career and work commitments, she also often resides in Los Angeles, California, and in Miami, Florida, where she owns apartments. She speaks Spanish (her native language), Italian, and English.

Tini has said she struggled with both anxiety and panic attacks, and that it was very difficult for her to return to the stage. She has also said she has been in therapy, and when she goes on tour, she usually takes her therapist with her. Tini owns six dogs, some of which she adopted from a dog shelter.

=== Relationships ===
In 2013, Tini started dating fellow Argentine actor Peter Lanzani. After two years of dating, they ended their relationship in April 2015. They got back together a month later, but split again in December 2015.

In September 2016, Tini announced that she had started dating Spanish model Pepe Barroso Silva, who was her co-actor in the music video for "Great Escape". In February 2018, Tini announced that she and Silva are no longer dating, but they got back together in May 2018. On 22 December 2018, Tini announced that she and Silva had split.

On 10 June 2019, Tini had confirmed that she and Colombian singer and frequent collaborator Sebastián Yatra were dating. In May 2020, both announced that they had ended their relationship.

Tini dated Argentine footballer Rodrigo De Paul from 2021 to 2023. They got back together in 2025. The following year, they became engaged.

== Other activities ==
=== Products and endorsements ===
In 2015, Tini became the face of L'Oréal's Miss Manga mascara line in Latin America. In 2016, she became the face of the clothing brand Cher. In 2017, Tini launched her clothing line called Tini by Martina Stoessel.

In 2018, she partnered with Ágatha Ruiz de la Prada and launched two fragrances: Rebel Love and Wow Girl. In May that year, Tini was announced as the brand ambassador for Great Wall Motor's automobile brand, Haval. Since August 2018, she has served as Pantene's ambassador in Argentina and Latin America, a partnership initially coined "PanTini". She became the brand's first Spanish-speaking US ambassador in November 2023. In November 2019, the singer became the face of Index, a clothing label by Ripley Peru. In 2020, she was the face of jewelry brand Pandora in Latin America, alongside her then-boyfriend Sebastián Yatra. In February 2020, Tini was named an ambassador for Adidas in Argentina.

In 2022, along with Anitta and Becky G, Tini was the spokesperson for WhatsApp's "Gender Equality in Music & Beyond" campaign. She collaborated with Pull&Bear on two clothing lines—a party-themed range and a summer collection—which were released in November 2022 and May 2023. In June 2023, she became an ambassador for sunglasses brand Hawkers; a collaborative collection was released in September. Since July 2023, Tini has served as one of the global ambassadors for Maybelline. In 2025, she fronted El Corte Inglés's spring-summer campaign alongside Quevedo, and was the face of Mercado Libre in Argentina and Chile. Later that year, she was announced as sportswear brand Under Armour's new global ambassador. In February 2026, Tini rejoined Pandora as its ambassador across Latin America. The following month, she became the face of Ripley in Chile and Peru.

=== Activism and philanthropy ===
On 10 August 2013, Tini performed, along with the cast of Violetta, at the UNICEF television charity event Un sol para los chicos, where she sang the songs, "Ser Mejor" and "En Mi Mundo". On 17 November 2016, she was named an honorary ambassador of the world peace by fellow human rights activist Adolfo Pérez Esquivel and Guatemalan political activist Rigoberta Menchú, at the Red voz por la paz ceremony in Buenos Aires. She is also a philanthropist and uses her fame as a platform to positively influence the lives of people around her.

In August 2018 and 2019, Tini participated again in Un sol para los chicos, a solidarity campaign for the benefit of UNICEF. Stoessel became a part of UNICEF's protect #GeneracionUnica for the rights of every child.

== Filmography ==
†	Denotes works that have not yet been released

Film roles
Year	Title	Role	Notes
2013	Monsters University	Carrie Williams	Voice role; Italian dub
2014	Violetta: La Emoción del Concierto	Herself / Violetta	Concert film
2014	Violetta: En Vivo en Buenos Aires	Herself / Violetta	Concert film
2015	Violetta: The Journey	Herself / Violetta	Television film; documentary
2016	Tini: The Movie	Tini	Sequel film to Violetta
2019	UglyDolls	Moxy	Voice role; Spanish dub
2022	Tini Tour 2022: En Vivo desde Buenos Aires	Herself	Concert film
2022	Tini Tour 2022: La Despedida del Año	Herself	Concert film
TBA	The Diary†	TBA	Completed; shelved

Television roles
Year	Title	Role	Notes
2007	Patito Feo	Martina / Young Anna (flashbacks)	Season 1; guest role
2012–15	Violetta	Violetta Castillo	Lead role; telenovela
2017	Soy Luna	Herself	Guest role
2017	Las Estrellas	Herself	Guest role
2018	La Voz Argentina	Herself (judge)	Season 2
2019	Pequeños Gigantes Argentina	Herself (judge)	
2020	Tini: Quiero Volver Tour	Herself	Web docuseries
2020	La Voz	Herself (advisor)	Season 7
2022	Solo Amor y Mil Canciones	Herself	Streaming special / concert film
2024	Tini presenta "Un Mechón de Pelo"	Herself	Streaming special / concert film
2024	Tini: Un Mechón de Pelo en Buenos Aires	Herself	Concert film
2024	Coldplay X Tini: Una Conexión Argentina	Herself	Streaming special / concert film
2024	Saturday Night Live	Herself (guest)	Special guest at Coldplay's show (episode: "Nate Bargatze / Coldplay")
2025	Breakdown	Miranda Senguinetti	Lead role; streaming television series

== Discography ==
- Tini (Martina Stoessel) (2016)
- Quiero Volver (2018)
- Tini Tini Tini (2020)
- Cupido (2023)
- Un Mechón de Pelo (2024)

== Tours ==
=== Headlining ===
- Got Me Started Tour (2017–2018)
- Quiero Volver Tour (2018–2020)
- Tini Tour (2022–2023)
- Futttura World Tour (2025–2027)

=== Co-headlining ===
- Violetta en Vivo (2013–2014)
- Violetta Live 2015 International Tour (2015)

== Awards and nominations ==
Actuality Awards
Year	Category	Nominee / work	Result	Ref.
2021	Best Female Song	"Miénteme"	Won	
2021	Best Collaboration	"La Niña de la Escuela" (with Lola Índigo and Belinda)	Won	

Billboard Argentina Awards
Year	Category	Nominee / work	Result	Ref.
2018	Artist of The Year	Herself	Won	
2019	Artist of The Year	Herself	Won	
2020	Artist of The Year	Herself	Won	

Billboard Latin Music Awards
Year	Category	Nominee / work	Result	Ref.
2023	Latin Pop Album of the Year	Cupido	Nominated	

Bravo Otto
Year	Category	Nominee / work	Result	Ref.
2015	Super Female TV Star	Herself	Gold	
2016	Super Female Singer	Herself	Gold	
2018	Super Female Singer	Herself	Nominated	

Gardel Awards
Year	Category	Nominee / work	Result	Ref.
2013	Best Movie or Television Soundtrack Album	Violetta	Won	
2019	Best Female Pop Album	Quiero Volver	Nominated	
2021	Best Pop Album	Tini Tini Tini	Nominated	
2021	Best Urbano/Trap Song or Album	"High (Remix)" (with María Becerra and Lola Índigo)	Nominated	
2021	Song of the Year	"Ella Dice"	Nominated	
2021	Collaboration of the Year	"Un Beso en Madrid" (with Alejandro Sanz)	Nominated	
2022	Song of the Year	"Miénteme" (with María Becerra)	Won	
2022	Record of the Year	"Miénteme" (with María Becerra)	Nominated	
2022	Best Pop Song	"Miénteme" (with María Becerra)	Won	
2022	Best Urbano Song	"Bar" (with L-Gante)	Nominated	
2022	Best Urbano Music Collaboration	"Bar" (with L-Gante)	Nominated	
2023	Song of the Year	"La Triple T"	Won	
2023	Record of the Year	"La Triple T"	Nominated	
2023	Best Pop Song	"La Triple T"	Nominated	
2023	Best Music Video: Short Form	"La Triple T"	Nominated	
2023	Best Urbano Music Collaboration	"La Loto" (with Becky G and Anitta)	Nominated	
2024	Record of the Year	"La Original" (with Emilia)	Nominated	
2024	Song of the Year	"La Original" (with Emilia)	Nominated	
2024	Collaboration of the Year	"La Original" (with Emilia)	Nominated	
2024	Best Music Video: Short Form	"La Original" (with Emilia)	Nominated	
2024	Best Urbano Pop Song	"La Original" (with Emilia)	Nominated	
2024	Best Urbano Pop Album	Cupido	Nominated	
2025	Collaboration of the Year	"Agua" (with Ca7riel & Paco Amoroso)	Won	

Heat Latin Music Awards
Year	Category	Nominee / work	Result	Ref.
2017	Best South Region Artist	Herself	Nominated	
2020	Best South Region Artist	Herself	Nominated	
2023	Best Female Artist	Herself	Nominated	
2024	Best South Region Artist	Herself	Nominated	

Kids' Choice Awards
Year	Category	Nominee / work	Result	Ref.
2013	Favorite Latin Artist	Violetta	Nominated	
2024	Favorite Artist (Latin America) (Note: Regional category for Nickelodeon Latin America; part of the international categories of the 2024 ceremony.)	Herself	Nominated	

Kids' Choice Awards Argentina
Year	Category	Nominee / work	Result	Ref.
2012	Female Newcomer	Violetta	Won	
2013	Favorite TV Actress	Violetta	Nominated	

Kids' Choice Awards Colombia
Year	Category	Nominee / work	Result	Ref.
2014	Female Newcomer	Violetta	Won	

Kids' Choice Awards Mexico
Year	Category	Nominee / work	Result	Ref.
2014	Favorite TV Actress	Violetta	Nominated	
2015	Favorite TV Actress	Violetta	Nominated	
2023	Favorite Latin Artist	Herself	Nominated	
2023	Master Fandom	Tinistas	Nominated	

Latin American Music Awards
Year	Category	Nominee / work	Result	Ref.
2022	Social Artist of the Year	Herself	Nominated	
2024	Favorite Pop Album	Cupido	Nominated	

Premios Los Más Clickeados
Year	Category	Nominee / work	Result	Ref.
2013	Celebrities with Highest Internet Rating	Herself	Won	
2015	Celebrities with Highest Internet Rating	Herself	Won	
2019	Celebrities with Highest Internet Rating	Herself	Won	

Los 40 Music Awards
Year	Category	Nominee / work	Result	Ref.
2021	Best Latin Act	Herself	Nominated	
2021	Best Spanish Video	"La Niña de la Escuela" (with Lola Índigo and Belinda)	Won	
2023	Best Latin Song	"Cupido"	Nominated	
2023	Best Latin Live Act	Herself	Nominated	
2024	Best Latin Song	"La Original"(with Emilia)	Won	

Lo Nuestro Awards
Year	Category	Nominee / work	Result	Ref.
2019	Revelation Artist of the Year	Herself	Nominated	
2022	Pop — Song of the Year	"Un Beso en Madrid"	Nominated	
2023	Remix of the Year	"La Ducha (Remix)" (with Elena Rose, María Becerra, Greeicy, and Becky G)	Nominated	
2024	Pop — Female Artist of the Year	Herself	Nominated	
2024	Pop/Urban — Album of the Year	Cupido	Won	
2024	Pop/Urban — Collaboration of the Year	"La Loto" (with Anitta and Becky G)	Nominated	

Lo Mas Premios Escuchado
Year	Category	Nominee / work	Result	Ref.
2019	Artist of The Year	Herself	Won	
2019	The Most Listened Song	"22"	Nominated	
2019	Trend Song	"Fresa"	Won	
2020	Latin Pop Record of The Year	"Tini Tini Tini"	Won	
2021	Latin Fandom	Tinistas	Won	
2022	Best Female Pop Artist of The Year	Herself	Won	
2022	Song of The Year	"Miénteme"	Won	
2022	Feat. of The Year	"2:50 Remix"	Won	

Latin Music Italian Awards
Year	Category	Nominee / work	Result	Ref.
2014	Best Look	Herself	Won	
2014	Best Fandom	Tinistas	Won	
2015	Best Look	Herself	Won	
2015	Best Fandom	Tinistas	Won	
2016	Best Latin Female Artist of The Year	Herself	Nominated	
2016	Best Latin Female Video of The Year	"Great Escape"	Nominated	
2016	Best Latin Female Album of The Year	"Tini (Martina Stoessel)"	Won	
2017	Best Latin Fandom	Tinistas	Nominated	
2017	Best Latin Female Artist of The Year	Herself	Nominated	
2018	Best Latin Female Artist of The Year	Herself	Nominated	
2018	Best Latin Album of The Year	"Quiero Volver"	Nominated	
2018	My Favorite Lyrics	"Quiero Volver"	Nominated	
2019	Best Latin Female Artist of The Year	Herself	Won	
2019	Best Latin Female Video of The Year	"22"	Nominated	

Latino Show Music Awards
Year	Category	Nominee / work	Result	Ref.
2021	Best Pop Song	"Un Beso en Madrid"	Won	
2022	Best Female Artist — Pop Urbano	Herself	Nominated	
2022	Best Female Artist — Pop	Herself	Nominated	
2023	Best Female Artist — Pop	Herself	Nominated	
2023	Best Pop Urbano Song	"La Triple T"	Won	

Martín Fierro Awards
Year	Category	Nominee / work	Result	Ref.
2013	Female Newcomer	Violetta	Won	

Martín Fierro Digital Awards
Year	Category	Nominee / work	Result	Ref.
2018	Best Musical Artist	Herself	Won	

Martín Fierro Fashion Awards
Year	Category	Nominee / work	Result	Ref.
2019	Best Style — Female Singer	Herself	Nominated	
2023	Best Style — Musical Artist	Herself	Nominated	

MTV Europe Music Awards
Year	Category	Nominee / work	Result	Ref.
2016	Best Latin America South Act	Herself	Nominated	
2018	Best Latin America South Act	Herself	Nominated	
2019	Best Latin America South Act	Herself	Nominated	
2021	Best Latin America South Act	Herself	Won	
2022	Best Latin America South Act	Herself	Won	

MTV MIAW Awards
Year	Category	Nominee	Result	Ref.
2018	Argentine Artist	Herself	Won	
2021	Argentine Artist	Herself	Won	
2022	Argentine Artist	Herself	Won	
2023	Video of the Year	"Muñecas" (with La Joaqui and Steve Aoki)	Nominated	
2023	Choreo Crack	Herself	Nominated	
2023	Fandom of the Year	Tinistas	Nominated	
2024	Pop Explosion of the Year	Herself	Nominated	
2024	Styler GRWM	Herself	Nominated	

MTV MIAW Awards Brazil
Year	Category	Nominee	Result	Ref.
2022	¡Me Gusta!	Herself	Won	

Musa Awards
Year	Category	Nominee	Result	Ref.
2021	International Collaboration of the Year	"Miénteme"	Nominated	

Premios Juventud
Year	Category	Nominee / work	Result	Ref.
2019	Best New Artist	Herself	Nominated	
2022	Girl Power	"La Niña de La Escuela" (with Lola Índigo and Belinda)	Nominated	
2022	Female Artist – On The Rise	Herself	Nominated	
2022	Best Fandom	Tinistas	Nominated	
2023	Artist of the Youth — Female	Herself	Nominated	
2023	Best Song For My Ex	"Cupido"	Nominated	
2023	Girl Power	"La Loto" (with Becky G and Anitta)	Nominated	
2023	Best Pop/Urban Song	"Cupido"	Nominated	
2023	Best Pop/Urban Collaboration	"Muñecas" (with La Joaqui and Steve Aoki)	Nominated	
2023	Best Pop/Urban Album	Cupido	Nominated	
2023	Best Regional Mexican Fusion	"Por El Resto De Tu Vida" (with Christian Nodal)	Nominated	
2023	Hottest Choreo	"La Loto" (with Becky G and Anitta)	Nominated	
2023	I Want More	Herself	Nominated	
2024	My Favorite Dance Track	"La Original" (with Emilia)	Nominated	
2024	Girl Power	"La Original" (with Emilia)	Nominated	

Premios Odeón
Year	Category	Nominee	Result	Ref.
2022	Song of the Year	"La Niña de la Escuela" (with Lola Índigo and Belinda)	Nominated	
2022	Video of the Year	"La Niña de la Escuela" (with Lola Índigo and Belinda)	Nominated	
2022	Best Urban Song	"La Niña de la Escuela" (with Lola Índigo and Belinda)	Nominated	
2022	Best Latin Song	"Miénteme"	Nominated	

Premios Tu Música Urbano
Year	Category	Nominee	Result	Ref.
2019	Best New Artist	Herself	Nominated	
2019	Best Video	"22"	Nominated	
2022	Top Rising Star — Female	Herself	Nominated	
2022	Collaboration of the Year	"Miénteme"	Nominated	
2022	Video of the Year — New Artist	"Miénteme"	Nominated	
2023	Top Artist — Female	Herself	Nominated	
2023	Top Social Artist	Herself	Nominated	
2023	Top Artist — Pop Urban	Herself	Nominated	
2023	Top Song — Pop Urban	"La Triple T"	Nominated	
2023	Video of the Year	"La Loto" (with Becky G and Anitta)	Nominated	
2023	Album of the Year – Female Artist	Cupido	Nominated	

Premios Quiero
Year	Category	Nominee	Result	Ref.
2016	Best Female Video	"Siempre Brillaras"	Nominated	
2016	Best Instagram Musician	Herself	Won	
2017	Best Female Video	"Si Tu te Vas"	Won	
2017	Best Pop Video	"Ya no Hay Nadie Que Nos Pare"	Nominated	
2017	Best Director Video	"Si Tu te Vas"	Nominated	
2017	Best YouTube Channel	Herself	Won	
2018	Best Female Video	"Princesa"	Nominated	
2018	Best Choreography Video	"Princesa"	Won	
2018	Best Melodic Video	"Consejo de Amor"	Nominated	
2018	Best YouTube Channel	Herself	Nominated	
2019	Best Female Video	"22"	Won	
2019	Best Extraordinary Encounter	"Por qué Te Vas"	Nominated	
2019	Best YouTube Channel	Herself	Nominated	
2019	Best Video Of The Year	"22"	Won	
2020	Best Video Of The Year	"Ella Dice"	Won	
2020	Best Extraordinary Encounter	"Ella Dice"	Nominated	
2020	Best Choreography Video	"Duele"	Nominated	
2020	Best Video — Female	"Oye"	Nominated	
2020	Best Pop Video	"Ya No Me Llames"	Nominated	
2020	Best Video — Female Artist	"High (Remix)"	Won	
2021	Best Extraordinarye Meeting	"Maldita Foto"	Nominated	
2021	Best Musician Influencer	Herself	Nominated	
2021	Best Video — Female	"Maldita Foto"	Nominated	
2021	Best Melodic Video	"Un Beso en Madrid"	Nominated	
2021	Best Pop Video	"Miénteme"	Nominated	
2021	Best Pop Video	"2:50 Remix"	Nominated	
2021	Video of the Year	"2:50 Remix"	Nominated	
2021	Video of the Year	"Miénteme"	Nominated	
2021	Song of the Year	"Miénteme"	Nominated	

Starlight Cinema Awards
Year	Category	Nominee	Result	Ref.
2016	Social Trend Topic	Tini: The Movie	Won	
