= Ella Dice =

2020 single by Tini and Khea

Single by Tini and Khea

from the album Tini Tini Tini
- Released: July 15, 2020
- Genre: Latin trap; Reggaetón
- Length: 2:42
- Label: Hollywood
- Songwriters: Martina Stoessel; Ivo Alfredo Thomas Serue; Andrés Torres; Mauricio Rengifo
- Producers: Torres; Rengifo

Tini singles chronology
"Bésame (I Need You)" (2020)	"Ella Dice" (2020)	"High (Remix)" (2020)

Khea singles chronology
"Dónde Estas (Remix)" (2020)	"Ella Dice" (2020)	"Ayer Me Llamó Mi Ex" (2020)

Music video
- "Ella Dice" on YouTube

"Ella Dice" (Spanish: "She Says") is a song by Argentine artists Tini and Khea. It was released on July 15, 2020 by Hollywood Records, as the sixth single from Tini's third studio album Tini Tini Tini. The song was written by two singers alongside Ivo Alfredo, Thomas Seruue, Andrés Torres and Mauricio Rengifo. The song was nominated in 2020 for the Gardel Awards in the category "Song of the Year".

== Background ==
The song was produced by Andrés Torres and Mauricio Rengifo, the video for the song was directed by Diego Peskins and Nuno Gomes. The song was a trend in various parts of Latin America. It reached the charts of Argentina, Ecuador, Mexico and Uruguay.

== Personnel ==
Credits adapted from Tidal.

- Tini – lead vocals, songwriter
- Khea – vocals, songwriter
- Andrés Torres – producer, songwriter, programming
- Mauricio Rengifo – producer, songwriter, programming
- DJ Riggins – assistant recording engineer
- Will Quinnell – assistant recording engineer
- Mike Seaberg – assistant recording engineer
- Jacob Richards – assistant recording engineer
- Marcelo Mato – recording engineer

== Charts ==
=== Weekly charts ===
Chart (2020)	Peak position
Argentina (Argentina Hot 100)	4
Argentina Airplay (Monitor Latino)	1
Argentina Latin Airplay (Monitor Latino)	1
Argentina National Songs (Monitor Latino)	1
Ecuador (Monitor Latino)	8
Ecuador Pop Songs (Monitor Latino)	6
Mexico (Monitor Latino)	3
Paraguay (SGP)	41
Uruguay (Monitor Latino)	8

=== Year-end charts ===
Chart (2020)	Position
Argentina Airplay (Monitor Latino)	26

== Certifications ==
Region	Certification	Certified units/sales
Argentina (CAPIF)	Gold	10,000^{*}
^{*} Sales figures based on certification alone.

== Awards and nominations ==
Year	Award	Category	Result	Ref.
2020	Quiero Awards	Best Video Of The Year	Won	
2020	Quiero Awards	Best Extraordinary Encounter	Nominated	
2021	Gardel Awards	Song of the Year	Nominated	

== See also ==
- List of Billboard Argentina Hot 100 top-ten singles in 2020
