= Tini (album) =

2016 studio album by Tini

Tini (Martina Stoessel)

Studio album by Tini
- Released: 29 April 2016
- Recorded: January–March 2016
- Studio: Los Angeles
- Genre: Pop
- Length: 71:36
- Language: English; Spanish
- Label: Hollywood
- Producer: Jason Evigan; Dreamlab; The Monsters & Strangerz; Chris DeStefano; Christoffer Lauridsen; Tommy Brown; Travis Sayles; Victoria Monet McCants; Gladius; Green; German; David Gamson; Jo. Alexander; Claudia Brant; Grades; Count Justice; Jordan Mohilowski

Tini chronology
Tini (Martina Stoessel) (2016)	Quiero Volver (2018)

Singles from Tini (Martina Stoessel)
- 1. "Siempre Brillarás" / "Born to Shine" Released: 25 March 2016; 2. "Great Escape" / "Yo Me Escaparé" Released: 24 June 2016; 3. "Got Me Started" / "Ya No Hay Nadie Que Nos Pare" Released: 14 October 2016; 4. "Si Tu Te Vas" Released: 4 May 2017

Tini (Martina Stoessel) (stylized as TINI (Martina Stoessel)) was the debut solo album by Argentine singer Tini, which also included music from Tini: The Movie. The lead single from the album, "Siempre Brillarás", and its English version, "Born to Shine", were released on 25 March 2016. The album was available for pre-order from that date. It was released by Hollywood Records on 29 April 2016.

The album received Gold certification in Argentina and sold over 100,000 copies worldwide in less than two months. The album reached number one in Argentina, as well as the top 10 in Italy, Germany, Austria and Poland.

== Background and production ==
Due to the worldwide success of the Argentine Disney Channel series Violetta, on 21 August 2015, it was revealed that Tini signed a recording contract with Hollywood Records to begin work on her first solo album. Following the conclusion of the international Violetta Live musical tour after the show's final season, Tini briefly relocated to Los Angeles to record her album with producers and songwriters over the course of three months, from January to March 2016.

On 17 June 2016, a version of the album containing the Spanish songs from the two discs and an additional track, a bilingual Spanish and English version of "Siempre Brillarás", was released.

On 14 October 2016, a deluxe edition of the album containing the songs from the first disc and two additional tracks, the Spanish versions of the respective songs "Great Escape" and "Got Me Started", "Yo Me Escaparé" (which had been already released as a single earlier) and "Ya No Hay Nadie Que Nos Pare" (featuring Colombian singer Sebastian Yatra), was released.

== Promotion ==
Two months after the album's release, on 12 June 2016, Tini performed songs from the album at her first showcase as a solo artist at La Usina del Arte in Buenos Aires. The showcase was filmed and broadcast on Stoessel's official YouTube channel from 22 August till 28 August. On 24 July, Stoessel made an appearance on the Argentine show Susana Gimenéz where she performed "Great Escape" and "Siempre Brillarás" and was interviewed by Gimenéz. On 17 August, Stoessel was interviewed for the Argentine radio station Radio La Red. On 20 August, Stoessel did a charity concert for children to celebrate the Children's Day at Teatro Tango Porteño in Buenos Aires where she performed several songs from the album, as well as songs from Violetta. Italian singer, actor and Violetta co-star Ruggero made a special guest appearance during the concert. Stoessel was also set to do a second charity concert for children to celebrate Children's Day at Barrio 31 on 21 August, but this was rescheduled to 28 August. During the concert, Stoessel performed several songs from the album and Violetta soundtracks, with Pasquarelli again making an appearance. The concert was broadcast live. On 25 June 2017, Stoessel appeared on Susana Gimenéz where she performed "Ya No Hay Nadie Que Nos Pare" alongside Colombian singer Sebastian Yatra. They also performed Yatra's hit single "Traicionera". In August 2017, Stoessel made a guest appearance in an episode of Disney Channel telenovela Soy Luna and performed the solo version of "Ya No Hay Nadie Que Nos Pare".

=== Singles ===
"Siempre Brillarás" and its English version, "Born to Shine", were both released as the album's lead singles on 25 March 2016.

"Great Escape", as well as its Spanish version, "Yo Me Escaparé", was released on 24 June 2016 as the second single from the album and Stoessel's first solo single.

"Got Me Started", as well as its Spanish version, "Ya No Hay Nadie Que Nos Pare" featuring Sebastian Yatra, was released on 14 October 2016, as the third single from the album to coincide with the release of the deluxe edition of the album.

The Spanish-language version of the song "My Stupid Heart", "Si Tu Te Vas", was released on 4 May 2017 as the fourth and final single from the album.

=== Music videos ===
The music video for the first single from the album, "Siempre Brillarás", was released on 25 March 2016. The English version, "Born to Shine", was released two weeks later, on 8 April 2016.

On 22 April 2016, a week before the album's release, the music video for "Light Your Heart", performed by Mexican singer and Violetta co-star Jorge Blanco, was released.

On 29 April 2016, the day of the album's release, the music video for "Yo Te Amo a Ti", performed together by Tini and Jorge Blanco, was released.

On 6 May 2016, the music video for "Losing the Love" was released.

On 8 July 2016, the music video for "Great Escape" was released, featuring Spanish model Pepe Barroso Silva.

On 8 December 2016, the music video for "Got Me Started" was released. The Spanish version, "Ya No Hay Nadie Que Nos Pare" featuring Sebastian Yatra, was released on 19 January 2017.

On 4 May 2017, the music video for "Si Tu Te Vas" was released.

== Track listing ==
Disc 1
No.	Title	Writer(s)	Producer(s)	Length
1.	"All You Gotta Do"	Haley Reinhart; Justin Johnson; Candy Shields; James "Gladius" Wong	Count Justice; Gladius; Dreamlab^{[a]}	3:22
2.	"Great Escape"	Marcus Lomax; Stefan Johnson; Jennifer Decilveo; Wensday S; Jordan K. Johnson; Oliver Peterhof	The Monsters & Strangerz; German; Dreamlab^{[a]}	4:07
3.	"Still Standing"	Lindy Robbins; Jason Evigan; Maureen "Mozella" McDonald	Evigan; Dreamlab^{[a]}	3:20
4.	"Got Me Started"	Evigan; Noonie Bao; Daniel Traynor	Evigan; Grades	3:31
5.	"My Stupid Heart"	Billy Steinberg; Evigan; Josh Alexander	Jo. Alexander; Steinberg; Dreamlab^{[a]}	3:38
6.	"Don't Cry for Me"	Evigan; Ross Golan; Ammar Malik; Kevin Snevely	Evigan; Dreamlab^{[a]}; Snevely^{[b]}	4:02
7.	"Finders Keepers"	Anne Preven; Wong; Michael Joseph Green	Green; Gladius; Dreamlab^{[a]}	3:12
8.	"Handwritten"	Shelly Peiken; Julia Michaels; David Gamson	Gamson; Dreamlab^{[a]}	3:55
9.	"Sólo Dime Tu"	Reinhart; Justin Johnson; Shields; Wong; Claudia Brant^{[c]}	Count Justice; Gladius; Brant^{[a]}; Dreamlab^{[a]}	3:22
10.	"Sigo Adelante"	Robbins; Evigan; McDonald; Brant^{[c]}	Evigan; Brant^{[a]}; Dreamlab^{[a]}	3:20
11.	"Si Tu Te Vas"	Steinberg; Evigan; Jo. Alexander; Brant^{[c]}	Jo. Alexander; Steinberg; Brant^{[a]}; Dreamlab^{[a]}	3:38
12.	"Lo Que Tu Alma Escribe"	Peiken; Michaels; Gamson; Brant^{[c]}	Gamson; Brant^{[a]}; Dreamlab^{[a]}	3:55
Total length:				43:22

Disc 2
No.	Title	Writer(s)	Producer(s)	Length
1.	"Siempre Brillarás"	Chris DeStefano; James T. Slater; Jessi Alexander; Brant^{[c]}	DeStefano; Brant^{[a]}	3:00
2.	"Se Escapa Tu Amor"	Richey McCourt; Nick Jarl; Christoffer Lauridsen; Lina Hansson; Brant^{[c]}	Lauridsen; Brant^{[a]}	3:40
3.	"Yo Te Amo a Ti" (with Jorge Blanco)	Shane Stevens; Thomas Brown; Travis Sayles; Victoria Monet McCants; Brant^{[c]}	Brown; Sayles; Brant^{[a]}	3:39
4.	"Confía en Mí"	Daniel James; Leah Haywood; Golan; Grant^{[c]}	Dreamlab; Brant^{[a]}	2:28
5.	"Born to Shine"	DeStefano; Slater; Je. Alexander	DeStefano; Brant^{[a]}	3:00
6.	"I Want You" (with Jorge Blanco)	Stevens; Brown; Sayles; McCants	Brown; Sayles; Brant^{[a]}	3:39
7.	"Light Your Heart" (Jorge Blanco solo)	Jess Cates; Jordan Mohilowski; Dan Ostebo	Mohilowski; Leyla Hoyle-Guerrero^{[a]}	3:33
8.	"Losing the Love"	McCourt; Jarl; Lauridsen; Hansson	Lauridsen; Brant^{[a]}	3:41
9.	"Siempre Brillarás" (Acoustic version)	DeStefano; Slater; Je. Alexander; Brant^{[c]}	Francisco Cia; Brant^{[a]}	1:34
Total length:				28:14

Spanish version
No.	Title	Writer(s)	Length
1.	"Sólo Dime Tú"	Reinhart; Justin Johnson; Shields; Wong	3:22
2.	"Sigo Adelante"	Robbins; Evigan; McDonald	3:20
3.	"Si Tu Te Vas"	Steinberg; Evigan; Josh Alexander	3:38
4.	"Lo Que Tu Alma Escribe"	Peiken; Michaels; Gamson	3:55
5.	"Siempre Brillarás"	DeStefano; Slater; Jessi Alexander	3:00
6.	"Se Escapa Tu Amor"	McCourt; Jarl; Lauridsen; Hansson	3:40
7.	"Yo Te Amo a Ti" (with Jorge Blanco)	Stevens; Brown; Sayles; McCants	3:39
8.	"Confía en Mí"	James; Haywood; Golan	2:28
9.	"Siempre Brillarás" (Acoustic version)	DeStefano; Slater; Jessi Alexander	1:34
10.	"Siempre Brillarás" (Spanish/English version)	DeStefano; Slater; Jessi Alexander	3:00
Total length:			31:36

Re-Release
No.	Title	Writer(s)	Length
1.	"All You Gotta Do"	Reinhart; Justin Johnson; Candy Shields; James Wong	3:22
2.	"Great Escape"	Lomax; Stefan Johnson; Decilveo; Wensday S; Jordan K. Johnson; Peterhof	4:07
3.	"Still Standing"	Robbins; Evigan; McDonald	3:20
4.	"Got Me Started"	Evigan; Bao; Traynor	3:31
5.	"My Stupid Heart"	Steinberg; Evigan; Josh Alexander	3:38
6.	"Don't Cry for Me"	Evigan; Golan; Malik; Snevely	4:02
7.	"Finders Keepers"	Preven; Wong; Green	3:12
8.	"Handwritten"	Peiken; Michaels; Gamson	3:55
9.	"Sólo Dime Tú"	Reinhart; Justin Johnson; Shields; Wong	3:22
10.	"Sigo Adelante"	Robbins; Evigan; McDonald	3:20
11.	"Si Tu Te Vas"	Steinberg; Evigan; Josh Alexander	3:38
12.	"Lo Que Tu Alma Escribe"	Peiken; Michaels; Gamson	3:55
13.	"Yo Me Escaparé"	Lomax; Stefan Johnson; Decilveo; Wensday S; Jordan K. Johnson; Peterhof	4:07
14.	"Ya No Hay Nadie Que Nos Pare" (featuring Sebastian Yatra)	Evigan; Bao; Traynor	3:31
Total length:			51:00

Notes

- ^{^[a]} signifies a vocal producer
- ^{^[b]} signifies an additional producer
- ^{^[c]} signifies a Spanish lyric translator

== Charts and certifications ==
=== Weekly charts ===
Chart (2016)	Peak position
Argentine Albums (CAPIF)	1
Austrian Albums (Ö3 Austria)	3
Belgian Albums (Ultratop Flanders)	17
Belgian Albums (Ultratop Wallonia)	25
Dutch Albums (Album Top 100)	44
French Albums (SNEP)	13
German Albums (Offizielle Top 100)	6
Hungarian Albums (MAHASZ)	11
Italian Albums (FIMI)	6
Polish Albums (ZPAV)	9
Portuguese Albums (AFP)	21
Spanish Albums (PROMUSICAE)	12
Swiss Albums (Schweizer Hitparade)	37

=== Year-end charts ===
Chart (2016)	Position
Austrian Albums (Ö3 Austria)	30
Belgian Albums (Ultratop Wallonia)	149
French Albums (SNEP)	175
German Albums (Offizielle Top 100)	84

=== Certifications ===
Region	Certification	Certified units/sales
Argentina (CAPIF)	Gold	20,000^{^}
Austria (IFPI Austria)	Gold	7,500^{*}
Poland (ZPAV)	Gold	10,000^{‡}
^{*} Sales figures based on certification alone.^{^} Shipments figures based on certification alone.^{‡} Sales+streaming figures based on certification alone.

== See also ==
- Got Me Started Tour
- 2016 in Latin music
- List of number-one albums in Argentina
