= Tini Tini Tini =

Studio album by Tini
- Released: 3 December 2020
- Recorded: 2019–2020
- Studio: Various: EastWest Studios (Los Angeles, California); Llano Grande (Colombia); Tini's home (Buenos Aires, Argentina)
- Genre: Latin pop; reggaeton; cumbia; trap
- Length: 36:48
- Language: Spanish
- Label: Hollywood; Universal Latin
- Producer: Alfonso Pérez; Andrés Torres; Chris Hierro; Mauricio Rengifo; Martin Martinez

Tini chronology
| Quiero Volver (2018) | Tini Tini Tini (2020) | Cupido (2023) |

Singles from Tini Tini Tini
- 1. "22" Released: 3 May 2019; 2. "Suéltate el Pelo" Released: 26 July 2019; 3. "Fresa" Released: 6 September 2019; 4. "Oye" Released: 11 October 2019; 5. "Recuerdo" Released: 10 January 2020; 6. "Ella Dice" Released: 15 July 2020; 7. "Duele" Released: 24 September 2020; 8. "Un Beso en Madrid" Released: 29 October 2020; 9. "Te Olvidaré" Released: 3 December 2020; 10. "Playa" Released: January 2021

Tini Tini Tini (stylized in all caps) is the third studio album by Argentine singer Tini, released on 3 December 2020, by Hollywood Records and Universal Music Latin. The album spawned eleven singles: "22" with Greeicy, "Suéltate el Pelo", "Fresa" with Lalo Ebratt, "Recuerdo" with Mau y Ricky, "Ella Dice" with Khea, "Duele" featuring John C, "Un Beso en Madrid" with Alejandro Sanz, "Te Olvidaré" and "Playa".

Tini experimented with new musical styles, primarily expanding the latin pop sounds of her predecessor Quiero Volver (2018), and approaching to new latin genres like trap, urban, reggaeton and cumbia.

Upon its release, the album reached at the second place in Argentina, and received a double diamond certification for having sold over 500,000 digital copies. Tini Tini Tini and its songs received three nominations for 23rd Annual Gardel Awards.

== Background ==
"Truth is, this album took a long time. For over a year and a half so many things happened in my life. It was a time of immense growth, both personal and professional. A lot of these songs were born in the midst of all this craziness, so I really think of the album as literally tracking all of that growth."

— Tini, for the album.

After releasing her second studio album, Quiero Volver, in October 2018, Tini began her Quiero Volver Tour of Latin America and Europe in December 2018, until March 2020, when the tour was stopped due to the COVID-19 pandemic. While she was still on tour, Tini stated that she had begun writing and working on her third studio album, and kicked off her third music era when she released a lead single "22" on 3 May 2019, with Colombian singer Greeicy.

Together with Andrés Torres, Mauricio Rengifo and other songwriters, Tini contributed to the composition of the songs of the album. Tini Tini Tini is the result of two years of work, and she said that the album has been one of the best things that has happened to her career and added that she "has grown as an artist" thanks to each of the songs that were made for the album. She also said that she could not pick her favourite song, because it depended on her mood, which also dictates how she makes music, allowing her to experiment with different genres.

With many planned 2020 releases, Tini's third album was pushed back when worldwide COVID-19 pandemic-related lockdowns affected the record's launch. On 16 November 2020, she revealed the title, cover and release date of Tini Tini Tini via her official social media accounts. On 3 December 2020, the album was presented after her single "Te Olvidare".

== Promotion ==
During the Quiero Volver Tour, Tini performed songs from Quiero Volver, but also the singles that she began releasing from Tini Tini Tini. It was scheduled that Tini embarked on a brand new tour for the album's promotion, but she could not do it due to the COVID-19 pandemic. Instead, Tini held a virtual live concert titled "Tini Tini Tini Live", which was broadcast by Claro video platform. In November 2022, she anaccued her third concert tour Tini Tour 2022, where she continued with the promotion of Tini Tini Tini album, but also promoted her fourth studio album. During the months of January and February 2022, a series of concerts were held prior to the official start of the tour, as the part of "Tini Tini Tini Show". In these, Tini toured various festivals im South America and gave concerts in Argentina, Chile and Bolivia.

== Music ==
From this album, Tini says that there are two genres very representative of Argentina as a country. Cumbia is a prominent genre in Argentina, and on "22" Tini did a fusion of cumbia and reggaeton, and it was the very first song she released from this album. And, "Duele" is very similar because tango is something that represents Argentina and all Argentines. The song is a fusion of tango and trap, which Tini had not done before. Those two songs represent the Argentine heritage, and emphasizes Tini's patriotism of which she is proud.

Tini also told in an interview for ET magazine: "The album has a lot of variety and all kinds of sounds. You know, I don’t wake up every day feeling any one way. I don’t want to do the same thing every day. I don’t listen to the same kind of music, or even the same kind of genre, every day. So when it comes to recording music, I do different things. I’m always changing, evolving. Some days I want to write a ballad, others I want to work on a reggaeton song. I wanted to break apart these ideas that if you write and sing ballads, you can’t do much else".

== Singles ==
The first single from the album "22", along with its music video was released on 3 May 2019. It was collaboration with Colombian singer Greeicy. The single was a big success. It debuted at No. 8 at the AR Billboard Hot 100, becoming Tini's first AR Hot 100 top-10 single. The single was certified platinum in Argentina by CAPIF.

The second single, "Suéltate el Pelo", was released on 18 July 2019. It was also used in a commercial and to promote Pantene hair products for Latin America.

The third single, "Fresa", featuring the vocals from Lalo Ebratt, was released on 6 September 2019. It peaked at No. 3 on AR Hot 100, becoming Tini's second top-5 single on the chard. The single was certified double platinum in Argentina by CAPIF.

The fourth single, "Oye", featuring Sebastián Yatra, was released on 11 October 2019. The song debuted at number 3 on the AR Hot 100 chart, making the third song in the history of the chart to achieve a debut at No. 3, and making Tini the only woman to debut two songs in the top-5 on the AR Hot chard. It was certified platinum in Argentina by CAPIF.

The fifth single, "Recuerdo", featuring Mau y Ricky, was released on 10 January 2020. It peaked at number 12 on AR Hot 200, making Tini's third top-20 on the chard.

The sixth single, "Ella Dice", featuring Khea, was released on 15 July 2020. The song debuted at number 4 on AR Hot 100, making Tini's third top 5 on the chard. The song was certified gold in Argentina by CAPIF.

The seventh single, "Duele", featuring rapper John C, was released on 24 September 2020. The song debuted at the AR Billboard Hot 100 at number 10.

The eighth single, "Un Beso en Madrid", featuring Alejandro Sanz, was released on 29 October 2020. It debuted at number 19 on AR Hot 100 chard. It also debuted at number forty nine on the Spanish Chard, making Tini's second song appears on the Spanish charts.

The ninth single, "Te Olvidaré" was released on 3 December 2020. The single was released the same day as the album. It peaked at number 70 on the Billboard Argentina Hot 100.

The tenth and final single, "Playa", was released in January 2021 as a limited Argentine radio release. Like the previous single, it also peaked at number 70 on the Billboard Argentina Hot 100.

=== Promotional single ===
"Diciembre", was released on 19 December 2019, as a promotional single after Tini presented the song for the first time on her Quiero Volver Tour.

== Reception ==
In a positive review, the Idolator website named the album as one of the "70 Best Pop Albums Of 2020", listed it on 25th place.

=== Commercial performance ===
Tini Tini Tini album debuted at second place in Argentina, with over 500,000 digital album units, and at top-40 on the PROMUSICAE Spanish chard.

The album entered the ranking of the ten most listened to albums worldwide on Spotify just three days after its release, according to the official Spotify Charts profile, conquering the fourth position.

== Track listing ==
Tini Tini Tini track listing
| No. | Title | Writer(s) | Producer(s) | Length |
|---|---|---|---|---|
| 1. | "Un Beso en Madrid" (with Alejandro Sanz) | Martina Stoessel; Alejandro Sanz; Andrés Torres; Mauricio Rengifo | Alfonso Pérez; Chris Hierro; Rengifo; Torres | 3:01 |
| 2. | "Fresa" (with Lalo Ebratt) | Stoessel; Rengifo; Torres; Lalo Ebratt | Rengifo; Torres | 2:45 |
| 3. | "Si Tú Supieras" | Stoessel; Rengifo; Torres | Rengifo; Torres | 2:36 |
| 4. | "Tuyo" | Stoessel; Rengifo; Torres; Francisco Cia | Rengifo; Torres | 1:59 |
| 5. | "Te Olvidaré" | Stoessel; Rengifo; Torres | Rengifo; Torres | 3:29 |
| 6. | "Acércate" | Stoessel; Rengifo; Torres | Rengifo; Torres | 3:10 |
| 7. | "Playa" | Stoessel; Rengifo; Torres | Rengifo; Torres | 2:28 |
| 8. | "Ella Dice" (with Khea) | Stoessel; Rengifo; Torres; Khea | Rengifo; Torres | 2:59 |
| 9. | "Duele" (with John C) | Stoessel; Rengifo; Torres; Geradro H. Matos Rodriguez; Enrique Maroni; Pascual Contursi; John C | Rengifo; Torres | 2:20 |
| 10. | "Recuerdo" (with Mau y Ricky) | Stoessel; Rengifo; Torres; Ricky & Mau Montaner | Rengifo; Torres | 3:30 |
| 11. | "Oye" (with Sebastián Yatra) | Stoessel; Rengifo; Torres; Sebastián Yatra | Rengifo; Torres | 3:05 |
| 12. | "Diciembre" | Stoessel; Rengifo; Torres; Francisco Cia | Rengifo; Torres | 3:09 |
| 13. | "Suéltate el Pelo" | Stoessel; Rengifo; Torres | Rengifo; Torres | 2:21 |
| 14. | "22" (with Greeicy) | Stoessel; Rengifo; Torres; Greeicy Rendón | Rengifo; Torres | 3:06 |
| Total length: | | | | 36:48 |

== Charts ==
| Chart (2020) | Peak position |
|---|---|
| Argentine Albums (CAPIF) | 2 |
| Spanish Albums (Promusicae) | 40 |
| Belgian Albums (Ultratop Flanders) | 184 |

== Certifications ==
| Region | Certification | Certified units/sales |
|---|---|---|
| Argentina (CAPIF) | 2× Diamond | 500,000 |
| Chile | 9× Platinum | |
| Central America (CFC) | Gold | |
