= Quiero Volver Tour =

2018–20 concert tour by Tini

- Tour by Tini
- Associated albums: Quiero Volver; Tini Tini Tini
- Start date: 13 December 2018
- End date: 9 March 2020
- Legs: 2
- No. of shows: 12 in Europe; 42 in Latin America; 54 in total
- Box office: $11 million

Tini concert chronology
- Got Me Started Tour (2017–2018); Quiero Volver Tour (2018–2020); Tini Tour (2022–2023)

The Quiero Volver Tour (lit. "I want to come back") was the second headlining concert tour by Argentine singer and songwriter Tini, in support of her second and third studio albums, Quiero Volver (2018) and Tini Tini Tini (2020), respectively. The tour was originally planned kick-off on 13 December 2018, at Estadio Luna Park, Buenos Aires, and ending on 18 September 2020, back in Buenos Aires at the Movistar Arena; however, due to the COVID-19 pandemic, it was interrupted six months earlier, ending on 9 March 2020, in Utrecht, Netherlands.

== Background ==
In August 2018, during her set at the charity show Un Sol Para los Chicos, the singer announced that the start of the tour would be in Buenos Aires on 1 December 2018, at Estadio Luna Park; days before the scheduled date, the show had to be pushed-back to 13 December, due to the G20 event. The initial show sold-out quickly, and included special guest appearances from artists such as Aitana, Ruggero Pasquarelli, and her frequent collaborators Cali y El Dandee.

Shortly after rescheduled the concert, further dates were announced for other regions in Argentina, as well as Chile, Colombia, México, Paraguay, Perú and Uruguay. At the end of 2019, a European leg of the tour was announced, visiting Belgium, France, Germany, Italy, the Netherlands, Spain, and Switzerland, starting at the beginning of 2020.

== Commercial performance ==
On 27 June 2020, the official figures for the tour were released through Hollywood Records, which also includes information on ticket sales as well as the general collection of the tour. It is estimated that more than 525,000 tickets have been sold, of which approximately 126,000 belong to festivals and free events. On the collection side, it is estimated at a total of more than $11,000,000.

Tini achieved a record as the Argentine artist with the most sold-out tickets at Estadio Luna Park, performing a total of nine concerts, 8 of which were completely sold out. The Argentine artist not only sold out the tickets for her presentations in Buenos Aires, but also had a great success in the rest of Latin America and Europe, with most of her concerts in the last destination completely sold out, with more than 22,000 sold out tickets in just one month.

== Setlist ==
This set list is from the concert on 4 March 2020, in Paris, France. It is not intended to represent all tour dates.

Act 1

1. "Princesa"
2. "Ya no hay nadie que nos pare"
3. "Fresa"
4. "Respirar"

Act 2

1. "Lights Down Low" (Latin Mix) — Interlude
2. "Finders Keepers"
3. "Si tú te vas"
4. "Great Escape"

Act 3

1. "Lucha por tus sueños"
2. "Diciembre"
3. "Cristina"
4. "Oye"
5. "Consejo de amor"
6. "Por qué te vas"

Act 4

1. "La Cintura" (Remix / Interlude)
2. "Suéltate el pelo"
3. "Quiero volver"
4. "Recuerdo"
5. "22"
6. "Te quiero más"
Notes
- 13 December 2018 - Buenos Aires: "Lo Malo (Remix)" with Aitana; "Consejo de Amor" with MYA and Ruggero; "Por Que Te Vas" with Cali y El Dandee.
- 9 February 2019 - Villa María: "Quiero Volver" with Sebastián Yatra.
- 25 May 2019 - Corrientes: "Lo Malo (Remix)" with Juliana Gallipoliti.
- 23 June 2019 - Santiago: "Lo Malo (Remix)" and "22" with Greeicy; "Si Tu Te Vas and "Pa Callar Tus Penas" with Cami; "Consejo de Amor" with MYA.
- 7 September 2019 - Montevideo: "Lo Malo (Remix)" with Meri Deal; "Yo Te Amo a Ti" and "Consejo de Amor" with Jorge Blanco.
- 18 October 2019 - Buenos Aires: "Fresa" with Lalo Ebratt; "Si Tu Te Vas" with Cami; "Cristina", "Oye" and "Quiero Volver" with Sebastián Yatra; "Por Que Te Vas" with Cali y El Dandee; "22" with Pablo Lescano.
- 26 October 2019 - Buenos Aires: "Me Rehúso" with Danny Ocean, "22" with Greeicy.
- 1 November 2019 - Buenos Aires: "Corazon Mentiroso" with Karina; "Échame la Culpa" and "No Me Doy por Vencido" with Luis Fonsi.
- 8 November 2019 - Lima: "Si Tu Te Vas" with Cami.
- 10 November 2019 - Mexico City: "Cristina", "Oye", "Un Año" and "Quiero Volver" with Sebastián Yatra.
- 16 November 2019 - Bogotá: "Fresa" with Lalo Ebratt; "Cristina", "Oye", "Un Año" and "Quiero Volver" with Sebastián Yatra.
- 28 November 2019 - Buenos Aires: Cristina, Oye and Quiero Volver with Sebastián Yatra.
- 3 December 2019 - Buenos Aires: "Tren del Cielo " with Soledad.
- 5 December 2019 - Buenos Aires: "22" and "Me Vas a Extrañar" with Pablo Lescano.
- 11 January 2020 - Mar del Plata: "Cristina", "Oye" and "Quiero Volver" with Sebastián Yatra.
- 12 January 2020 - Punta del Este: "Cristina", "Oye" and "Quiero Volver" with Sebastián Yatra.

== Tour dates ==
List of concerts, showing date, city, country, venue
Date	City	Country	Venue
Leg 1 - Latin America
13 December 2018	Buenos Aires	Argentina	Luna Park Stadium
12 January 2019	Pinamar	Argentina	Manzana de la Quintana
25 January 2019	Mar del Plata	Argentina	Radio City Theater
9 February 2019	Villa María	Argentina	Villa María Anfiteatro
13 April 2019	Buenos Aires	Argentina	Olympic Park
25 May 2019	Corrientes	Argentina	Paseo Hangar
1 June 2019	Villa Mercedes	Argentina	La Pedrera Arena
2 June 2019	Villa Mercedes	Argentina	La Pedrera Arena
14 June 2019	Rosario	Argentina	Metropolitano
15 June 2019	Córdoba	Argentina	Complejo Forja
23 June 2019	Santiago	Chile	Movistar Arena
7 September 2019	Montevideo	Uruguay	Antel Arena
25 September 2019	San Salvador de Jujuy	Argentina	La Tablada Stadium
26 September 2019	Tucumán Province	Argentina	Teatro Mercedes Sosa
27 September 2019	Tucumán Province	Argentina	Teatro Mercedes Sosa
28 September 2019	Salta	Argentina	Provincial Theater
11 October 2019	San Francisco	Argentina	Howard Johnson
12 October 2019	Rio Cuarto	Argentina	Costanera Opus
18 October 2019	Buenos Aires	Argentina	Luna Park Stadium
26 October 2019	Buenos Aires	Argentina	Luna Park Stadium
1 November 2019	Buenos Aires	Argentina	Movistar Arena
2 November 2019	Neuquén	Argentina	Ruca Che Stadium
8 November 2019	Lima	Peru	Plaza Arena Jockey
10 November 2019	Mexico City	México	Pepsi Center
16 November 2019	Bogotá	Colombia	North Highway Events Center
28 November 2019	Buenos Aires	Argentina	Luna Park Stadium
29 November 2019	Buenos Aires	Argentina	Luna Park Stadium
30 November 2019	San Nicolás	Argentina	Planta General Savio
3 December 2019	Buenos Aires	Argentina	Luna Park Stadium
5 December 2019	Buenos Aires	Argentina	Luna Park Stadium
6 December 2019	Formosa	Argentina	Juventud Anfitheater
8 December 2019	Resistencia, Chaco	Argentina	Sarmiento Athletic Club
10 December 2019	Asunción	Paraguay	SND Arena
12 December 2019	Santiago del Estero	Argentina	Forum
11 January 2020	Mar del Plata	Argentina	Polideportivo Islas Malvinas
12 January 2020	Punta del Este	Uruguay	Punta del Este Convention Center
7 February 2020	Mendoza	Argentina	Complejo Deportivo Munical
9 February 2020	General Roca, Río Negro	Argentina	Predio Fiesta Nacional de la Manzana
Leg 2 - Europe
20 February 2020	Milan	Italy	Fabrique
22 February 2020	Bassano del Grappa	Italy	Paladue
23 February 2020	Rome	Italy	Auditorium Parco della Musica
25 February 2020	Berlin	Germany	Huxley's Neue Welt
26 February 2020	Hamburg	Germany	Docks Club
28 February 2020	Zürich	Switzerland	X-TRA
29 February 2020	Munich	Germany	TonHalle
1 March 2020	Stuttgart	Germany	LKA Longhorn
3 March 2020	Frankfurt	Germany	Batschkapp
4 March 2020	Paris	France	Salle Pleyel
6 March 2020	Cologne	Germany	Calswerk Victoria
9 March 2020	Utrecht	Netherlands	Tivoli

== Cancelled shows ==
List of cancelled concerts, showing date, city, country, venue and reason
Date	City	Country	Venue	Reason
10 March 2020	Lisbon	Portugal	Capitólio	COVID-19 pandemic
11 March 2020	Barcelona	Spain	Razzmatazz	COVID-19 pandemic
12 March 2020	Madrid	Spain	Joy Eslava	COVID-19 pandemic
19 September 2020	Buenos Aires	Argentina	Movistar Arena	COVID-19 pandemic
