= Got Me Started Tour =

2017–18 concert tour by Tini

- Tour by Tini
- Associated album: Tini (Martina Stoessel)
- Start date: 18 March 2017
- End date: 15 January 2018
- Legs: 2
- No. of shows: 23 in Europe; 9 in South America; 32 in total
- Box office: $8.7 million (23 shows)

Tini concert chronology
- Got Me Started Tour (2017–2018); Quiero Volver Tour (2018–2020)

The Got Me Started Tour was the first headlining concert tour by Argentine singer Tini, in support of her debut studio album, Tini (Martina Stoessel) (2016). The tour began on 18 March 2017 in Madrid, Spain, at Palacio Vistalegre, and concluded on 15 January 2018 in Mar del Plata, Argentina, at Parque Camet.

It was the highest-grossing tour of 2017 by an Argentine artist. Additionally, at the end of 2017, the tour was placed on Pollstar's list of "Top 100 Worldwide Tours" for that year, grossing US$8.7 million from 23 shows.

== Background ==
On 6 October 2016, Tini announced via social media that she would be embarking upon a debut concert tour, beginning several months later in March 2017. The tour was titled after her hit single "Got Me Started". European tour dates were announced for Spain, Switzerland, Germany and Austria, followed by Italy, Hungary, Poland, France and Belgium. After the European leg, Tini intended to close-out the tour in Latin America, ending at-home, in Argentina.

== Set list ==
This set list is representative of the show on 25 March 2017 in Stuttgart, Germany. It is not representative of all concerts for the duration of the tour.

Act 1

1. "Got Me Started"
2. "Don't Cry for Me"
3. "Finders Keepers"
4. "Si Tú Te Vas"
5. "Sigo Adelante"

Act 2

1. "Veo Veo"
2. "Te Creo"

Act 3

1. "Cómo Quieres"
2. "Crecimos Juntos"

Act 4

1. "Lucha Por Tus Sueños" (Interlude)
2. "Ser Mejor"
3. "Se Escapa Tu Amor"
4. "Yo Te Amo a Ti"
5. "Lo Que Tu Alma Escribe"
6. "Libre Soy"

Act 5

1. "Hoy Somos Más"

Act 6

1. "All You Gotta Do"
2. "Sorry" (Justin Bieber cover) / "Crazy in Love" (Beyoncé Break Dance)
3. "Confía en Mí"

Act 7

1. "En Mi Mundo"

Encore

1. "Great Escape"
2. "Siempre Brillarás"
Notes
- During the shows in Madrid, Buenos Aires, São Paulo, Lima, Santiago, Córdoba and Mar del Plata, Stoessel sang "Ya No Hay Nadie Que Nos Pare" instead of "Got Me Started".
- During the shows in Milan and Rome, Stoessel sang "All'Alba Sorgerò" instead of "Libre Soy", and "Nel Mio Mondo" instead of "En Mi Mundo".
- During the show in Milan, Stoessel was joined onstage by two fans to sing the a capella version of "Siempre Brillarás".
- Starting from the shows in Buenos Aires, "Confía en Mí" is performed in place of "Ya No Hay Nadie Que Nos Pare" as the opening song, while "Ya No Hay Nadie Que Nos Pare" is performed in place of "Confía en Mí". "Si Tu Te Vas" is performed in place of "Sigo Adelante", while the latter song is performed in place of the former song. "Hoy Somos Más" was removed from the set list.
- During the shows in Buenos Aires, Stoessel was joined onstage by Colombian singer Sebastian Yatra to perform "Ya No Hay Nadie Que Nos Pare". They also performed Yatra's single "Traicionera".
- During the show in Santiago, Stoessel performed "Lucha Por Tus Sueños" before "Ser Mejor".
- Starting from the October 14 show in Buenos Aires, Stoessel's recent single "Te Quiero Más" is included in the set list.
- During the October 14 show in Buenos Aires, Stoessel was joined onstage by Spanish singer India Martínez to perform "Yo Te Amo a Tí". They also performed Martinez's song "Corazón Hambriento".
- During the show in Mar del Plata, Stoessel sang "Sólo Dime Tu" instead of "All You Gotta Do".

== Tour dates ==
List of concerts, showing date, city, country, venue, opening acts, tickets sold, amount of available tickets, and number of shows
Date	City	Country	Venue	Opening acts	Attendance	Revenue
Leg 1 - Europe
18 March 2017	Madrid	Spain	Palacio Vistalegre	—N/a	15,000 / 15,000	—N/a
25 March 2017	Stuttgart	Germany	Hanns-Martin-Schleyer-Halle	New Hope Club	—N/a	—N/a
26 March 2017	Stuttgart	Germany	Hanns-Martin-Schleyer-Halle	New Hope Club	—N/a	—N/a
28 March 2017	Milan	Italy	Mediolanum Forum	Greta Menchi	—N/a	—N/a
30 March 2017	Rome	Italy	PalaLottomatica	Greta Menchi	—N/a	—N/a
2 April 2017	Budapest	Hungary	Budapest Arena	—N/a	10,615 / 12,500	—N/a
3 April 2017	Kraków	Poland	Tauron Arena	—N/a	—N/a	—N/a
6 April 2017	Łódź	Poland	Atlas Arena	—N/a	—N/a	—N/a
9 April 2017	Vienna	Austria	Stadthalle D	—N/a	—N/a	—N/a
11 April 2017	Munich	Germany	Olympiahalle	New Hope Club	—N/a	—N/a
12 April 2017	Zürich	Switzerland	Hallenstadion	—N/a	6,343 / 9,500	$761,374
16 April 2017 (Note: The 16 April 2017 show at Lanxess Arena in Cologne includes a matinee and evening show.)	Cologne	Germany	Lanxess Arena	New Hope Club; Mike Singer	—N/a	—N/a
17 April 2017 (Note: The 17 April 2017 show at Barclaycard Arena in Hamburg includes a matinee and evening show.)	Hamburg	Germany	Barclaycard Arena	New Hope Club	11,350 / 21,886	$776,314
18 April 2017	Berlin	Germany	Mercedes-Benz Arena	New Hope Club	8,835 / 11,020	$634,665
20 April 2017	Oberhausen	Germany	König Pilsener Arena	New Hope Club	—N/a	—N/a
21 April 2017	Oberhausen	Germany	König Pilsener Arena	New Hope Club	—N/a	—N/a
23 April 2017 (Note: The 23 April 2017 show at Zénith Paris in Paris was originally scheduled to take place on 30 April 2017, but was rescheduled due to "scheduling changes".)	Paris	France	Zénith Paris	—N/a	—N/a	—N/a
3 May 2017	Brussels	Belgium	Palais 12	Just Like Me! cast	—N/a	—N/a
6 May 2017 (Note: The 6 May 2017 show at Lanxess Arena in Frankfurt includes a matinee and evening show. The evening show was broadcast live on Stoessel's Facebook page.)	Frankfurt	Germany	Festhalle Frankfurt	—N/a	—N/a	—N/a
Leg 2 - South America
30 June 2017	Buenos Aires	Argentina	Teatro Gran Rex	—N/a	—N/a	—N/a
1 July 2017 (Note: The 1 July 2017 show at Teatro Gran Rex in Buenos Aires includes a matinee and evening show.)	Buenos Aires	Argentina	Teatro Gran Rex	—N/a	—N/a	—N/a
15 July 2017	São Paulo	Brazil	Citibank Hall	—N/a	1,946 / 4,170	$142,105
8 September 2017	Lima	Peru	Park of the Exposition Amphitheater	—N/a	—N/a	—N/a
10 September 2017	Santiago	Chile	Movistar Arena	—N/a	—N/a	—N/a
14 October 2017	Buenos Aires	Argentina	Teatro Gran Rex	—N/a	3,262 / 3,300	—N/a
21 October 2017	Córdoba	Argentina	Plaza de la Música	—N/a	—N/a	—N/a
15 January 2018 (Note: The concert of 15 January 2018 in Mar del Plata was part of the 2018 Acercarte Festival: a series of free events organized by the government of Buenos Aires Province.)	Mar del Plata	Argentina	Parque Camet	—N/a	40,000 / 40,000	—N/a
Total					117,037 / 253,374 (46.2%)	$8,842,105

== Cancelled shows ==
List of cancelled concerts, showing date, city, country, venue and reason for cancellation
Date	City	Country	Venue	Reason/Additional Info
5 April 2017	Porto	Portugal	Super Bock Arena	Logistical issues
25 April 2017	Lille	France	Zénith de Lille	Logistical issues
26 April 2017	Strasbourg	France	Zénith de Strasbourg	Logistical issues
28 April 2017	Montpellier	France	Zénith Sud	Logistical issues
29 April 2017	Lyon	France	Halle Tony Garnier	Logistical issues

== Change of venue ==
List of changes of venue, showing date, city, country, former venue, new venue and reason
Date	City	Country	Former venue	New venue	Reason/Additional Info
7 October 2017	Córdoba	Argentina	Orfeo Superdomo	Plaza de la Música	Low number of tickets sold.
