= Ayer Me Llamó Mi Ex =

2020 single by Khea featuring Lenny Santos

Single by Khea featuring Lenny Santos
- Released: August 20, 2020
- Genre: Latin trap; Bachata
- Length: 3:27
- Label: Young Flex; Interscope
- Songwriters: Ivo Alfredo Thomas Serue; Christian José Restrepo Herrera; Patis Eteine LaMotte
- Producer: Nobeat

Khea singles chronology
"Ella Dice" (2020)	"Ayer Me Llamó Mi Ex" (2020)	"Khea: Bzrp Music Sessions Vol. 34" (2020)

Music video
- "Ayer Me Llamó Mi Ex" on YouTube

"Ayer Me Llamó Mi Ex" (transl. "Yesterday My Ex Called Me") is a song by Argentine latin trap singer Khea featuring American bachata guitarist Lenny Santos. It was released on August 20, 2020. The music video for the song has more than 125 million views on YouTube. The song has over 115 million plays on Spotify.

== Background ==
The song was produced by Nobeat, the video for the song was directed by Ballve. The song talks about a guy who gets a call from his ex-girlfriend just to see each other again. The song includes the collaboration of the former guitarist of the bachata group Aventura, Lenny Santos, merging bachata with trap.

The song was a trend in several countries, ranking at the top of the charts in Argentina and Spain, and it also obtained a gold record in Spain in three weeks.

== Remix ==
On November 5, 2020, Khea released the remix of the song together with Dominican singer Natti Natasha and American singer Prince Royce. The song reached 2 million views on YouTube in just one day and made it to the top 10 in global trends on YouTube and Spotify.

== Personnel ==
Credits adapted from Tidal.

- Khea – vocals
- Lenny Santos – guitar
- Nobeat – producer
- Paris Eteine LaMotte – songwriter
- Mike Fuller – engineer
- Marcelo Mato – studio personnel
- Natti Natasha – vocals (remix)
- Prince Royce – vocals (remix)
- D'Lesly "Dice" Lora – songwriter (remix)
- Rafael A. Pina Nieves – songwriter (remix)
- Yonathan Then – songwriter (remix)
- Ronald López – songwriter (remix)
- Andrea Mangiamarchi – songwriter (remix)
- Antonio Oliver – studio personnel (remix)
- Joel White – studio personnel (remix)

== Charts ==
=== Weekly charts ===
Chart (2020–2021)	Peak position
Argentina (Argentina Hot 100)	6
Argentina (Argentina Hot 100) Remix version	5
Argentina Airplay (Monitor Latino)	13
Argentina Latin Airplay (Monitor Latino)	9
Argentina National Songs (Monitor Latino)	2
Global 200 (Billboard)	121
Global 200 (Billboard) Remix version	77
Spain (PROMUSICAE)	2
US Hot Latin Songs (Billboard) Remix version	33
US Latin Airplay (Billboard) Remix version	28
US Latin Rhythm Airplay (Billboard) Remix version	17
US Tropical Airplay (Billboard) Remix version	4

=== Monthly charts ===
Chart (2020-2021)	Peak position
Argentina Digital Songs (CAPIF)	3
Paraguay (SGP)	27
Paraguay (SGP) Remix Versión	94

=== Year-End charts ===
Chart (2020)	Peak position
Spain (PROMUSICAE)	45

== Certifications ==
Region	Certification	Certified units/sales
Spain (PROMUSICAE)	3× Platinum	180,000^{‡}
United States (RIAA)	3× Platinum (Latin)	180,000^{‡}
^{‡} Sales+streaming figures based on certification alone.

== See also ==
- List of Billboard Argentina Hot 100 top-ten singles in 2020
