= List of Violetta characters =

This is a list of characters appearing in the Disney Channel series Violetta. The characters are all fictional, except for celebrity guests who appear as themselves.

== Casting ==
Martina Stoessel was cast in the show at the age of 14, and changed schools to accommodate the show's shooting schedule. The actor Diego Ramos was cast as Violetta's father following an audition in Europe. The actress Lodovica Comello, who plays Francesca, was attending school in Milan when she decided to participate.

In the second season, the show brought back most of its cast, with the exception of Simone Lijoi, Rodrigo Velilla, Artur Logunov and lead actor Pablo Espinosa. Diego Domínguez was brought on to play León's new romantic rival, Diego. In addition, the show held casting sessions for fans of the series in Milan, Naples, and Rome for videos that appeared on Disney Channel Italy

In its third season, the show added French actor Damien Lauretta and Mexican actress Macarena Miguel to the cast.

== Main characters ==
=== Violetta Castillo ===
The title character (portrayed by Martina Stoessel) is a talented girl and the protagonist of the original television series. She is intelligent and vivacious with an overprotective father. She is a spontaneous and honest girl. She has a beautifully unique voice that she inherited from her mother, who died in a car crash when Violetta was 5 years old. Violetta just wants to find her own place in the world and to learn more about it. When she returns to Buenos Aires, Violetta discovers her passion for music and starts attending Studio 21 (now On Beat Studio) behind her father's back. There, she makes her first friends and learns more about herself. She also meets two very different boys, Tomás and León, who both fall for her. Soon, she finds herself in a love triangle and has trouble deciding who she truly loves. Violetta realizes that music means everything to her and that singing is what she wants to do for the rest of her life. But she knows that her father wouldn't accept it and, out of fear, hides everything from him, complicating their lives even more, until the final episode of season 1, when he hears Violetta singing.

=== Germán Castillo ===
Germán Castillo (portrayed by Diego Ramos) is Violetta Castillo's overprotective father. He is a brilliant engineer, owner of a construction company that does international public and private works of great caliber. He is strict and demanding. Since the death of his wife, Maria, he has overprotected his daughter Violetta, but beneath his rigidity lies a big heart. He had a girlfriend, Jade, whom he considered a good influence on her. But the arrival of Angie, Violetta's tutor completely disturbs him, but not wanting to admit it, ends up falling in love with her while engaged to Jade.

=== Tomás Heredia ===
Tomás Heredia (portrayed by Pablo Espinosa) is a very talented guy and one of Violetta's two love interests. He can play the guitar and the piano and attends Studio 21 with a grant from Beto, who hired him as his assistant. Born in Spain, he moved to Buenos Aires with his mother to take care of his grandmother. Tomás falls for Violetta despite her father's attempts. At the end of the first season, Tomás moved back to Spain permanently: so he does not appear for the second and third series.

=== León Vargas ===
León Vargas (portrayed by Jorge Blanco) is Violetta's love interest. León attends On Beat Studio and has a big artistic potential. He used to be a part of the "cool crowd" and was Ludmila's boyfriend. But when he discovered that Ludmila liked Tomás, he broke up with her. To get even, he decides to win Violetta over as she was Tomás' crush but he soon falls in love with her against his will, but Due to his newfound love, he changes his ways and transforms into a kind, supportive and outgoing friend to all the other students in the studio. In Season 2, his new hobby is motocross, and his new rival is Diego.

=== Diego Hernández ===
Diego Casal Hernández is the second male protagonist in the second and third season of the Disney Channel Latin America's original show, Violetta. He's the typical 'bad boy' of the school who came from Madrid to Buenos Aires to look for his father, and was willing to go to great lengths to find him.

=== Ludmila Ferro ===
Ludmila Ferro (portrayed by Mercedes Lambre) is a glamorous, beautiful talented girl from On Beat Studio, and her only friend is Natalia, but unfortunately, she thinks she's better than any other student. Ludmila was never really in love until she began to have feelings for Federico. That's when love started to change her attitude a bit. But, she kept going on back and forth with her snappy attitude. During the last few episodes of Season 3, Ludmila's attitude was changed forever and was even being nice to Naty.

=== Francesca Caviglia ===
Francesca Caviglia (portrayed by Lodovica Comello) is a smart, caring, and determined girl born in Italy along with her older brother Luca, who ran the family business, Resto Band. Despite her brother's opinions about wasting their father's money by attending On Beat Studio, Francesca believes she can develop into a successful music artist in the music industry, due to the studio's reputation of being the place where a lot of famous people have studied.

=== Camila Torres ===
Camila Tores (portrayed by Candelaria Molfese) is a fun, upbeat, and outgoing girl. Maxi, Violetta and Francesca are her best friends. Camila dreams of becoming a successful and recognized singer. She is no doubt played by her friends and defended by them. She's talented but knows she has not yet achieved artistic maturity necessary to make the leap to success which is the reason why she dresses different a lot.

=== Maximiliano "Maxi" Ponte ===
Maxi Ponte (portrayed by Facundo Gambandé) is one of the many students at Studio 21. His best friends are Francesca and Camila, and later, becomes close friends with Violetta. He is especially good at dancing and hip-hop music.

=== Natalia "Naty" ===
Naty (portrayed by Alba Rico) is a student at On Beat Studio and is Ludmila's sidekick. However, she is more Ludmila's servant than her friend: She knows Ludmila would betray her if there was something in it for her, but she stays with her anyway, hoping that it would help her become a diva as well.

=== Andrés ===
Andrés (portrayed by Nicolás Garnier) is a clumsy guy with a very sympathetic and caring personality. He's always trying to get girls to ask him out, as he falls in love easily. At the beginning, he was part of the in-crowd, because he used to hang out with Ludmila, Naty, and León, but as the series progresses, he becomes more independent, while remaining Leon's friend. He eventually gets forced to work for Gregorio as his sidekick after being caught being the one behind Ludmila's attacks.

He is very ambitious and knows that he can take advantage of the talent of the guys from Studio 21 to attract customers to the Restó Bar. He converts his restaurant into a Restó Band to present live shows and, if possible, sing his own songs. Luca is interested in becoming an artist, like his sister.

=== Federico ===
Federico (portrayed by Ruggero Pasquarelli) He is a former Italian YouMix star and a student at the Studio. He is generally a nice and helpful person, but he can sometimes be slightly arrogant and stubborn. He cares a lot about his fans, and he would do anything to make them happy.

=== Broduey ===
Broduey (portrayed by Samuel Nascimento) is a student at On Beat Studio. From São Paulo, he is an excellent dancer. Gregorio asked him to attend the Studio because of his dancing skills and hopes that he will make the Studio better and encourage the other students to work harder. At first, he had a crush on Violetta, but she just saw him as a friend. For a while, Tomas and Leon were jealous of him but Violetta soon made it clear that she and Broduey were just friends. He dates Camila Torres.

=== Ángeles "Angie" Carrara ===
Ángeles "Angie" Carrara (portrayed by Clara Alonso) is Violetta's tutor and aunt, the sister of Violetta's late mother, María. She works at Studio 21 as the singing teacher, and she has a brilliant voice but doesn't show it that she hides something from Violetta. But later on, Ludmila reveals to Violetta that Angie is her aunt. Violetta was happy but mad that she never told her. But after all that happened, Gérman and Angie get married in the last episode of Season 3.

=== Olga Patricia Peña ===
Olga Patricia Peña (portrayed by Mirta Wons) is the Castillo family housemaid. She loves and takes care of Violetta like her own daughter.

=== Lisandro Ramallo ===
Lisandro Ramallo (portrayed by Alfredo Allende), often called "Ramallo," is Germán's personal assistant and best friend. Olga is in love with him. In nearly every episode, he has to mention "personal space" to her. He is initially afraid of Olga's new romantic companion, Oscar Cardozo. However, in Season 3, Olga and Ramallo fall in love. Olga tries to make him understand she would like him to propose to her. She becomes jealous after Ramallo befriends the new housekeeper, Castillo Noélia. Eventually he and Olga form a group called "Personal Space."

=== Jade La Fontaine ===
Jade LaFontaine (portrayed by Florencia Benítez) is Germán's girlfriend. She is extremely superficial and obsessed with her image. She is selfish and manipulative. She is a charming villain, to her brother Matías's real villain. She comes from a very wealthy family. Born rich and never having worked, she and her brother decide that the only way to maintain their standard of living is for her to marry Germán. Jade hates Violetta because she steals Germán's attention. She also hates Angie, her rival for Germán's heart. In the second season, Jade hires a young woman named Esmeralda to separate Germán and Angie. Jade tries to fall out of love, but is unable to do so. She talks to Matías and tells him she will become rich. We learn that Jade can sing opera. In the last episode of Season 2, the police arrest Matías.

=== Matías La Fontaine ===
Matías La Fontaine (portrayed by Joaquín Berthold) is Jade's brother. Violetta learns that he is under house arrest. At the beginning of Season 1, Maty lives in his car, then he is secretly under house arrest in Castillo. Jade becomes aware of his arrest after questioning why Maty will not leave the house. He disguises himself as the ghost of Germán's deceased wife Maria. In Season 2, Jade and Matías hire an actress to steal money from Germán and break his heart so that he will falls back into Jade's arms. On multiple occasions, Matías prevents his sister from revealing their plan to Germán. At the end of Season 2, he is arrested by the police in his sister's company.

=== Gregorio Casal ===
Gregorio Casal (portrayed by Rodrigo Pedreira) is Studio 21's narcissistic choreography teacher. He eventually becomes the director of the studio. He absolutely hates Tomas, and sends Andre to sneak around Tomas, looking for an excuse to kick him out of the studio. In the second season, he tells Diego that he is Diego's father.

=== Roberto "Beto" Benvenuto ===
Beto Benvenuto (portrayed by Pablo Sultani) is Studio 21's absentminded, clumsy music composition teacher. He is loved by all students, and is especially close with Tomás, who works for him. Beto often guides Tomás through his love life.

=== Pablo Galindo ===
Pablo Galindo (portrayed by Ezequiel Rodríguez) is Studio 21's temporary director. After the show he directed fails, he resigns from Studio 21. He then accepts a job at the Resto Band.

=== Antonio Fernández Méndez ===
Antonio (portrayed by Alberto Fernández de Rosa) is the owner of Studio 21 and a close friend of Violetta's grandmother. In his absence, Pablo is appointed as the acting director. He is saddened when Pablo resigns and appoints Gregorio as the director. |2=

== Recurring characters ==
=== Luca Caviglia ===
Luca Caviglia (portrayed by Simone Lijoi) is Francesca's brother and manager of the Restó Bar, a bar next to Studio 21 where the guys usually hang out. Initially, his imposing physical stature and strong personality make everyone think that he has a bad temper. However, in time, they realize that he has a good heart.

=== Napoleón "Napo" ===
Napoleón (portrayed by Rodrigo Velilla), as his name suggests, has a "Napoleonic" personality. In the beginning he wants to hang out with his cousin Ludmila and be part of the in-crowd. Over time, he drifts apart from the group. He takes the access exam with Violetta and passes thanks to his singing and dancing talent.

=== Braco ===
Braco (portrayed by Artur Logunov) is intelligent and a bit wild. He is a fantastic popping-and-locking, Hip Hop dancer. His appearance and his accent reveal that he is foreign, but he never says where he comes from. Braco speaks several languages and, when he gets upset or nervous, he starts speaking Russian or Ukrainian. He has a proverb or piece of advice from his country for every occasion and is always ready to help his friends. Although he never mentions it, Braco has a secret crush on Violetta.

=== Helena "Lena" ===
Helena "Lena" (portrayed by Lucía Gil) is Naty's younger sister. She has a v-log where she uploads videos of her singing her own songs and some of Ludmila's songs. Gregorio listened to her songs and he chose her to be the new face of On Beat Studio.

=== Clement/Alex ===
Clement Cortés, also known as Alexandre Alex Benoit.

=== Angélica Carrara ===
Angélica Carrara (portrayed by Nilda Raggi) is mother of Angie Carrará and María Saramego. After the death of her daughter María Saramego, she tried to find a way to communicate with her granddaughter, Violetta Castillo.

=== Rafael "Rafa" Palmer ===
Rafael "Rafa" Palmer (portrayed by German Tripel) is a famous international rock star who was a student at Studio 21 when he was young. He was the special guest invited to the Studio to watch the students perform the song "Always Dancing".

=== Laura ===
Laura (portrayed by Nicole Luis) is Andres' sister. She is innocent and angelic, but not very intelligent. Maxi has romantic feelings for her, but she ultimately calls things off with him. Laura is Andres's younger sister. She is a little clumsy, like her brother Andres. Maxi has a crush on her, but she doesn't know it. Andres is very overprotective of her. He didn't let her go out with boys, especially Maxi. Andres and Maxi went to a boxing centre and they fought. Maxi won and Andres let him go out with Laura. When Andrea, a girl that is deeply in love with Maxi, made a blog about him, Laura discovered the blog and she broke up with him.

=== Marotti ===
Marotti (portrayed by Diego Álcala) is the executive producer of YouMix. He comes to On Beat Studio to organize the reality show "Talents 21" because Gregorio needed to promote the Studio and get more money so that it wouldn't be forced to close. As he is Gregorio's sidekick, and has the same personality as Gregorio, he could be considered an antagonist.

=== Andréa ===
Andréa (portrayed by Nikole Castillo) is one of the students at Studio 21. She loves playing the cello, and she even has a name for her cello, Igor. She is deeply in love with Maxi, even though he doesn't feel anything for her. It all started when she saw Maxi walking and she dropped her cello and Maxi caught it. Andrea fell in love with him and she imagined that he's a prince. She will do anything to win Maxi's heart, but Maxi doesn't accept it. She has an Emo style, but later she changes her look and this time, Maxi falls in love with her. She pretended to like Andres to make Maxi jealous, so Andres broke up with her.

=== María Saramego ===
María Saramego, or Maria Saramago (portrayed by Florencia Erdozain) (only mentioned) is Violetta's late mother and Herman's late wife. As stated by Angie and Violetta, Maria was a wonderful, talented and dedicated woman who had a huge passion for music. She was a very successful singer, but with Violetta's birth, she decided to dedicate more time to her daughter. María was a singer and Violetta inherited her musical talent from her. María died when Violetta was 4 years old.

=== Agustina ===
Agustina Heredia (portrayed by Iara Muñoz) is Tomas' little cousin that resides in Buenos Aires, Argentina. She supports Tomas to stay with Violetta.

=== Maestro Zambrano ===
Maestro Zambrano (portrayed by Pedro Maurizi) is a young boy that has a great musical talent. He comes to Studio 21 because Antonio invited him to visit the Studio. He has a crush on Agustina, Tomas's cousin, but she only sees him as a friend. It's mentioned that he has his first concert when he was 7 and he can play all the instrument that exist. He is probably 12 years old, because he looks around the same age as Agustina and Agustina is 12. His full name is never revealed during the series Violetta

=== Luis ===
Luis (portrayed by Joaquin Mendez) is the first guy that Violetta met in the airplane. He tried to flirt with her, but he stopped after Herman tells him that Violetta is dangerous and that he shouldn't talk to her.

=== Dufré ===
Dufré (portrayed by Martín Pavlovsky) is Gregorio's psychologist and a friend of Antonio's.

=== Lombardo ===
Lombardo (portrayed by Mariano Musimeci) is the officer in charge of the custody of Matias and legal matters.

=== Améndola ===
Amendola (portrayed by Francisco Benvenuti) is the art director who Pablo hired for the Studio's show in the theater.

=== Gustavo ===
Gustavo (portrayed by Thiago Batistuta) is a guy from Studio 21. Naty was in love with him, but he was just using her to get closer to Ludmila.

=== Charly ===
Charly (portrayed by Jesús Villegas) is the producer of an animal food corporation. He needed to find someone to be the image of his new product, FatPig pig food. At first, he tried to make Camila sign the contract, but later he failed because she discovered that the contract is a trap. Right after that, Ludmila comes but she doesn't listen to Maxi and Camila when they try to tell her that the contract is a trap and she signs it.

=== Mara ===
Mara (portrayed by Sumi Justo) is the new chef of the Resto Band. Maxi is in love with her, but she revealed that she's his cousin. Andres and Braco are in love with her too. Maxi and Mara nearly started dating when Mara told him that they weren't actually related, but she said that she couldn't date someone who had a crush on someone they thought they were related to.

=== Valeria ===
Valeria (portrayed by Yasmim Manaia) is Broduey's cousin from Brazil who came to visit him while her stay in Argentina for a dance contest. Camila and Naty quickly became jealous because they thought Maxi and Broduey were using her to make them jealous, but actually she was using them, with permission, to make her boyfriend jealous.

=== Oscar Cardozo ===
Oscar Cardozo is a bodyguard who's in love with Olga Peña. Oscar is portrayed by Luis Sabatini. Oscar seems to have a two-sided personality. He acts very sweet and caring towards the people he likes, such as Emma and Olga, but he's hostile and cold towards those he dislikes, such as Andres and Ramallo.

=== Ámbar ===
Ámbar (portrayed by Agustina Cabo) is Esmeralda's daughter. She's intelligent and kind, but she can also be very manipulative and cunning.

=== Ingrid ===
Ingrid is Violetta's new governess. She replaces Angie after she moved to France. Olga is jealous of her, as she liked Ramallo.

== Special Guest stars ==
- College 11 and Rock Bones were the first celebrities to guest star as themselves. They appeared in Episode 34 of Season 1. Rock Bones became recurring characters throughout the show, with band member Sebas serving as Camila's love interest during the show's second season. College 11 made one repeat appearance, participating in a YouMix contest during Season 2.
- Bridgit Mendler had a cameo performing "Hurricane" with the guys of Studio 21.
- R5 guest starred as themselves on the 70th episode of Season 3, singing "Heart Made Up On You." Band member Ross Lynch appeared as himself on the prior episode.

== English voice cast ==
English voice cast
Character	Voice actor	Vocals
Violetta	Cristina Valenzeula	Maggie McClure (Season 1) Clara Rugaard-Larsen (Season 2 and 3)
Leon	Sam Riegel (Season 1) Michael Sinterniklaas (Season 2 and 3)	Sam Riegel (Season 1) Tue Sander Sørensen (Season 2 and 3)
Herman	Geoffrey Chalmers	Kasper Leisner (Season 2) Claus Storgaard (Season 3)
Angie	Wendee Lee	Annevig Schelde Ebbe (Season 2 and 3)
Ludmila	Joie Marlowe	Kate Higgins (Season 1) Katrine Falkenberg (Season 2 and 3)
Diego	Tony Azzolino	Mads Enggaard
Francesca	Johanna Luis	Jessica Rau (Season 1) Clara Oxholm (Season 2 and 3)
Camila	Cindy O'Conner	Colleen Villard (Season 1) Mette Dahl Trudslev (Season 2 and 3)
Maxi	Bryce Papenbrook	Shane Henry (Season 1 - singing); Bryce Papenbrook (Season 1 - rapping) Simon Nøiers (Season 2 and 3)
Broduey	Chris Jai Alex (Season 1 and Season 2) Marcus Griffith (Season 3)	Simon Stenspil (Season 2 and 3)
Naty	Christine Marie Cabanos	Gry Trampedach (Season 2 and 3)
Federico	Todd Haberkorn	Todd Haberkorn (Season 1); Claus Storgaard (Season 2 and 3)
Andres	Michael Chapman	Shane Henry (Season 1) Rasmus Cundell (Season 2 and 3)
Marco	Bradley Gamble	Allan Hyde
Pablo	Fred McDougal	
Jade	Erin Fitzgerald	Sara Ekander Poulsen (Season 2 and 3)
Matias	Spike Spencer	
Ramallo	Dave Mallow	Michael Elo
Olga	Jane Carroll	Pauline Rehné (Season 2) Ann Hjort (Season 3)
Gregorio	Keith Silverstein	Thomas Mørk (Season 2)
Beto	Buba Kachow	Mads Knarreborg (Season 2 and 3)
Antonio	Joey Lotsko	
Marotti	Matthew Mercer	
Priscilla	Anne Yatco	Vibeke Dueholm
Gery	Erika Harlacher	Kit Flensted
Clement	Brian Beacock	Claus Storgaard
Milton	Martin Bilany	
Lara	Sarah Anne Williams	Kit Flensted
Esmeralda	Karen Strassman	Karoline Munksnæs
Jackie	Laura Post	
Doctor Dufre	Steve Kramer	Lars Thiesgaard
Cardoso	Miguelito Sorichio	
Emma	Reba Buhr	
DJ	Ben Pronsky	Claus Storgaard
Tomas	Lucien Dodge	Johnny Yong Bosch
Napoleon	Johnny Yong Bosch	Lucien Dodge
Braco	Michael Sinterniklass	Ben Caron
Luca	Grant George	
Agus	Cindy O'Conner	
Rafa Palmer	Mike Davis	
Laura	Cherami Leigh	
Gustavo	Ben Diskin	
Mara	Cherami Leigh	
Andrea	Cindy Robinson	
