= Bizarrap discography =

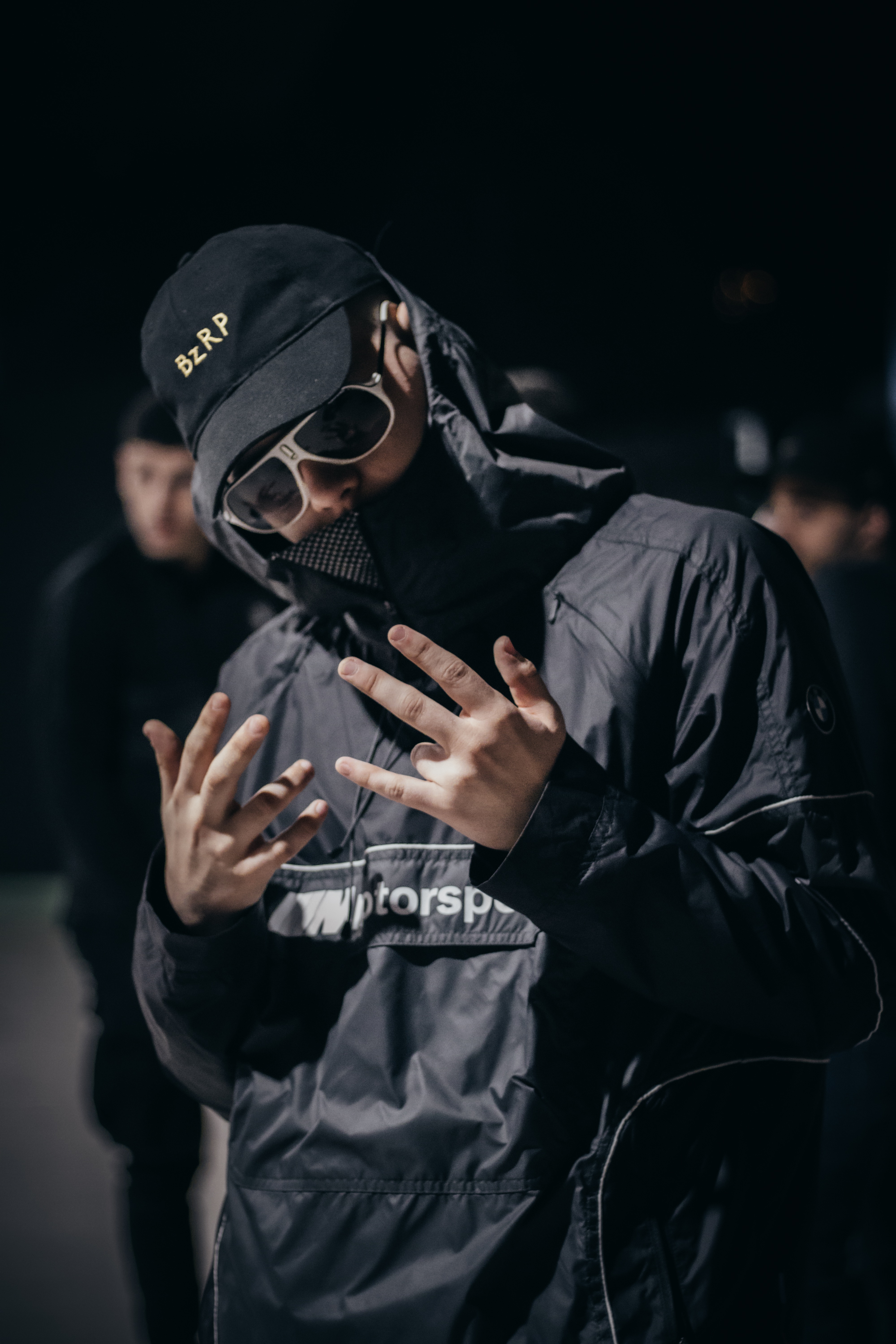
- Bizarrap in 2019
- EPs: 1
- Singles: 73
- Promotional singles: 3

This is the discography of Argentine DJ and record producer Bizarrap, which consists of one extended play, seventy-three singles and three promotional singles. Bizarrap is known for his "Music Sessions" in which he produces tracks featuring vocals by other artists. Some of the most popular Sessions contain vocals by Nathy Peluso, Tiago PZK, Villano Antillano, Quevedo, Shakira, Anuel AA, Peso Pluma and Nicky Jam.

== Extended plays ==
List of EPs, with selected details
Title	Extended play details	Peaks		Certifications
Title	Extended play details	SPA	US Latin	Certifications
En Dormir sin Madrid (with Milo J)	Released: 4 October 2023; Label: Dale Play; Format: Digital download, streaming	3	46	PROMUSICAE: Gold

== Music Sessions ==
=== 2019 ===
List of music sessions of 2019 with chart positions
Vol.	Collaborator	Peak chart positions		Certifications
Vol.	Collaborator	ARG	SPA	Certifications
1	Bhavi	—	—	
2	Ecko	—	—	
3	Paco Amoroso	—	—	
4	Blunted Vato	—	—	
5	Pekeño 77	—	—	
6	Kódigo	—	—	
7	DrefQuila	—	—	
8	Zanto	—	—	
9	Dillom	—	—	AMPROFON: Gold
10	Frijo	89	—	AMPROFON: Gold
11	Kiddo Toto	—	—	
12	Mesita	—	—	
13	Nicki Nicole	3	—	PROFOVI: Gold; AMPROFON: 4× Platinum+Gold; PROMUSICAE: Platinum
14	Ca7riel	—	—	
15	Alemán	46	—	AMPROFON: Diamond+2× Platinum+Gold; PROMUSICAE: Gold
16	Trueno	13	99	AMPROFON: Platinum; PROMUSICAE: Gold
17A	Kinder Malo	—	—	
17B	Kinder Malo	—	—	
18	John C	17	—	
19	Polimá Westcoast	—	—	
20	Louta	—	—	
"—" denotes a recording that did not chart or was not released in that territory.

=== 2020 ===
List of music sessions of 2020 with selected chart position and certifications
Vol.	Collaborator	Peak chart positions						Certifications
Vol.	Collaborator	ARG	CHL	PAR	SPA	URU	WW	Certifications
21	Neutro Shorty	—	—	—	—	—	—	
22	Lalo Ebratt	—	—	—	—	—	—	
24	Dani Ribba	49	—	—	—	—	—	PROMUSICAE: Gold
25	Don Patricio	55	—	—	—	—	—	PROMUSICAE: Gold
26	Lucho SSJ	60	—	—	—	—	—	
27	Bejo	—	—	—	—	—	—	
28	Big Soto	81	—	—	—	—	—	
29	C.R.O	18	—	—	—	—	—	
30	Homer el Mero Mero	57	—	—	—	—	—	
31	Zaramay	12	—	—	—	—	—	AMPROFON: Platinum; PROMUSICAE: Gold
32	Cazzu	16	—	—	—	—	—	AMPROFON: Platinum+Gold
33	Seven Kayne	63	—	—	—	—	—	
34	Khea	24	—	—	48	—	—	AMPROFON: Platinum
35	Asan	80	—	—	—	—	—	
36	Nathy Peluso	4	14	24	11	9	121	PROFOVI: Gold; PROMUSICAE: 3× Platinum
"—" denotes a recording that did not chart or was not released in that territory.

=== 2021 ===
List of music sessions of 2021 with selected chart positions and certifications
Vol.	Collaborator	Peak chart positions										Certifications
Vol.	Collaborator	ARG	CHL	COL	MEX	PAR	PER	SPA	URU	US Latin	WW	Certifications
37	Ysy A	13	—	—	—	—	—	—	—	—	—	
38	L-Gante	1	—	—	—	88	—	43	—	—	171	PROFOVI: Gold; AMPROFON: 2× Platinum; PROMUSICAE: Platinum
39	Snow Tha Product	20	—	—	—	—	—	15	—	— (Note: "Snow Tha Product: Bzrp Music Sessions, Vol. 39" did not enter the Billboard Hot Latin Songs chart, but peaked at number 14 on the Billboard Latin Digital Songs Sales chart.)	— (Note: "Snow Tha Product: Bzrp Music Sessions, Vol. 39" did not enter the Billboard Global 200 chart, but peaked at number 147 on the Global Excl. US chart.)	AMPROFON: Gold; PROMUSICAE: Platinum; RIAA: Platinum (Latin)
40	Eladio Carrión	10	—	—	—	—	—	15	—	—	162	AMPROFON: Platinum+Gold; PROMUSICAE: 2× Platinum
41	Nicky Jam	1	2	16	9	12	—	3	— (Note: "Nicky Jam: Bzrp Music Sessions, Vol. 41" did not enter on the Uruguay Top 20 singles chart, but peaked at number 10 on the Monitor Latino Uruguay Top 20 Airplay chart.)	38	26	AMPROFON: Gold; PROMUSICAE: 2× Platinum
43	Chucky73	34	—	—	—	—	—	31	—	—	—	PROMUSICAE: Platinum
44	MHD	43	—	—	—	—	—	45	—	—	—	
45	Ptazeta	21	—	—	—	100	—	11	—	—	— (Note: "Ptazeta: Bzrp Music Sessions, Vol. 45" did not enter the Billboard Billboard Global 200 chart, but peaked at number 154 on the Global Excl. US.)	AMPROFON: Gold; PROMUSICAE: 2× Platinum
46	Anuel AA	7	—	—	—	—	—	3	—	38	122	PROMUSICAE: Platinum
47	Morad	81	—	—	—	—	—	1	—	—	— (Note: "Morad : Bzrp Music Sessions, Vol. 47" did not enter the Billboard Billboard Global 200 chart, but peaked at number 173 on the Global Excl. US.)	PROMUSICAE: 3× Platinum
48	Tiago PZK	3	18	—	—	1	10	3	3	—	58	AMPROFON: Platinum; PROMUSICAE: 6× Platinum; RIAA: Gold (Latin)
"—" denotes a recording that did not chart or was not released in that territory.

=== 2022 ===
List of music sessions of 2022 with selected chart positions and certifications
Vol.	Collaborator	Peak chart positions										Certifications
Vol.	Collaborator	ARG	CHL	COL	ITA	MEX	PER	SPA	URU	US	US Latin	Certifications
49	Residente	1	12	6	—	4	6	3	—	—	22	AMPROFON: Platinum; PROMUSICAE: Platinum
23	Paulo Londra	1	10	15	—	13	8	1	1	—	—	PROFOVI: Gold; AMPROFON: Gold; PROMUSICAE: 2× Platinum
51	Villano Antillano	10	—	23	—	25	18	5	8	—	—	PROFOVI: Gold; AMPROFON: 2× Platinum+Gold; PROMUSICAE: 3× Platinum
52	Quevedo	1	1	1	1	1	1	1	1	79	9	FIMI: 8× Platinum; PROFOVI: 2× Diamond; AMPROFON: 2× Diamond+Platinum; PROMUSICAE: 17× Platinum; RIAA: 15× Platinum (Latin)
50	Duki	1	10	23	—	24	15	1	12	—	—	AMPROFON: Gold; PROMUSICAE: 2× Platinum
"—" denotes a recording that did not chart or was not released in that territory.

=== 2023 ===
List of music sessions of 2023 with selected chart positions and certifications
Vol.	Collaborator	Peak chart positions										Certifications	Album
Vol.	Collaborator	ARG	CHL	COL	ITA	MEX	PER	SPA	URU	US	US Latin	Certifications	Album
53	Shakira	1	1	1	1	1	1	1	1	9	1	PROFOVI: Gold; AMPROFON: Diamond+Platinum+Gold; FIMI: 3× Platinum; PROMUSICAE: 7× Platinum; RIAA: Gold	Las Mujeres Ya No Lloran
54	Arcángel	9	11	6	—	—	11	3	—	—	34	AMPROFON: Gold; PROMUSICAE: Platinum	Non-album singles
55	Peso Pluma	3	2	9	—	1	5	3	6	31	5	PROFOVI: Gold; PROMUSICAE: Platinum	Non-album singles
56	Rauw Alejandro	10	23	—	—	—	12	1	18	—	36	AMPROFON: Platinum; PROMUSICAE: 2× Platinum	Non-album singles
57	Milo J	1	5	9	—	—	3	2	3	—	—	PROFOVI: Gold; AMPROFON: Platinum; PROMUSICAE: Platinum	En Dormir sin Madrid
"—" denotes a recording that did not chart or was not released in that territory.

=== 2024 ===
List of music sessions of 2024 with selected chart positions and certifications
Vol.	Collaborator	Peak chart positions										Certifications
Vol.	Collaborator	ARG	CHL	COL	MEX	PER	SPA	URU	US Bub.	US Latin	WW	Certifications
58	Young Miko	3	7	12	22	4	1	3	9	20	14	PROFOVI: Gold; AMPROFON: Platinum+Gold; PROMUSICAE: 2× Platinum
59	Natanael Cano	40	—	—	2	—	42	—	—	20	26	AMPROFON: 3× Platinum+Gold
60	Lismar	— (Note: "Lismar: Bzrp Music Sessions, Vol. 60" did not enter the Billboard Argentina Hot 100 but peaked at number 15 on the Monitor Latino Argentina National Songs chart.)	—	—	—	—	—	—	—	—	—	
61	Luck Ra	2	— (Note: "Luck Ra: Bzrp Music Sessions, Vol. 61" did not enter the Billboard Chile Songs chart, but peaked at number four on the Monitor Latino Chile Airplay chart.)	—	—	—	25	4	—	—	—	PROMUSICAE: Platinum
"—" denotes a recording that did not chart or was not released in that territory.

=== 2025–2026 ===
List of music sessions of 2025 and 2026 with selected chart positions and certifications
Vol.	Collaborator	Year	Peak chart positions										Certifications
Vol.	Collaborator	Year	ARG	CHL	COL	MEX	PER	SPA	URU	US Bub.	US Latin	WW	Certifications
0	Daddy Yankee	2025	1	2	9	9	1	2	2	14	11	8	PROMUSICAE: 2× Platinum
62	J Balvin	2025	9	—	51	—	—	26	—	—	—	—	
42	Myke Towers	2026	62	—	—	—	—	20	—	—	—	—	
"—" denotes a recording that did not chart or was not released in that territory.

== Other singles ==
List of singles as lead artist, showing selected chart positions, certifications, and associated albums
Title	Year	Peak chart positions										Certifications	Album
Title	Year	ARG	BOL	CHL	ECU	PAR	PER	SPA	URU	US Latin	WW	Certifications	Album
"Like Boss" (with Frijo featuring Moonkey, Polimá Westcoast, Akapellah, Duki, Santos and Zanto)	2019	92	—	—	—	—	—	—	—	—	—		Non-album singles
"Flexin'" (with Lit Killah)	2020	11	—	—	—	—	—	—	—	—	—	CAPIF: Platinum; AMPROFON: Gold; PROMUSICAE: Gold	Non-album singles
"Mamichula" (with Trueno and Nicki Nicole)	2020	1	8	14	6	79	4	1	—	—	100	CAPIF: 3× Platinum; AMPROFON: 2× Platinum; CUD: 2× Platinum; IFPI CHL: Platinum; PROMUSICAE: 5× Platinum	Atrevido
"Verte" (with Nicki Nicole and Dread Mar I)	2020	14	—	—	—	—	—	—	—	—	—	RIAA: Gold (Latin)	Parte de Mí
"Ya Me Fui" (with Duki and Nicki Nicole)	2021	8	—	—	—	59	—	19	5	—	181	AMPROFON: Gold; PROMUSICAE: Platinum	Non-album single
"Unfollow" (with Duki and Justin Quiles)	2021	19	—	—	—	—	—	17	—	—	— (Note: "Unfollow" did not enter the Billboard Billboard Global 200 chart, but peaked at number 131 on the Global Excl. US.)	PROMUSICAE: Platinum	Temporada de Reggaetón
"Sin Frenos" (with Eladio Carrión and Duki)	2021	—	—	—	—	—	—	52	—	—	—	AMPROFON: Gold; PROMUSICAE: 2× Platinum	Sauce Boyz 2
"Pinta" (with L-Gante featuring Pablo Lescano)	2022	66	—	—	—	—	—	—	—	—	—		Non-album single
"Dangerous" (with Nicki Nicole and Trueno)	2022	83	—	—	—	—	—	—	—	—	—		Parte de Mí
"Jungle" (with Trueno and Randy)	2022	67	—	—	—	—	—	—	—	—	—		Bien o Mal
"Puff" (with Bhavi)	2022	—	—	—	—	—	—	—	—	—	—		Pochoclos
"3 Estrellas en el Conjunto" (with Duki and la T y la M)	2022	39	—	—	—	—	—	—	—	—	—		Non-album single
"Baby Hello" (with Rauw Alejandro)	2023	29	—	— (Note: "Baby Hello" did not enter the Billboard Chile Songs chart, but peaked at number six on the Monitor Latino Chile Top 20 Airplay chart.)	—	11	—	2	9	32	99	AMPROFON: Gold; FIMI: Gold; PROMUSICAE: 5× Platinum; RIAA: 3× Platinum (Latin)	Playa Saturno
"Remember Me" (with Duki and Khea)	2023	22	—	—	—	—	—	49	—	—	—		Antes de Ameri
"Fruto" (with Milo J)	2023	10	7	11	13	—	7	22	6	—	106	PROFOVI: Gold; PROMUSICAE: Gold	En Dormir sin Madrid
"Entre las de 20" (with Natanael Cano)	2024	—	—	—	—	—	—	—	—	26	51	AMPROFON: 3× Platinum+Gold	Non-album single
"—" denotes a recording that did not chart or was not released in that territory.

== Freestyle Sessions ==
2018:

- "Bzrp Freestyle Sessions, Vol. 1" (with Kódigo)
- "Bzrp Freestyle Sessions, Vol. 2" (with Sony)

2019:

- "Bzrp Freestyle Sessions, Vol. 3" (with Lit Killah)
- "Bzrp Freestyle Sessions, Vol. 4" (with Acru)
- "Bzrp Freestyle Sessions, Vol. 5" (with Ecko)
- "Bzrp Freestyle Sessions, Vol. 6" (with Trueno)
- "Bzrp Freestyle Sessions, Vol. 7" (with Dani Ribba)
- "Bzrp Freestyle Sessions, Vol. 8" (with Aczino)

== Promotional singles ==
List of promotional singles
Title	Year	Album
"Se Te Da Bien" (with Estani)	2018	Non-album promotional singles
"Lil Baby" (with Pekeño 77)	2020	Non-album promotional singles
"Jugador del Año" (with Trueno and Acru)	2020	Non-album promotional singles
"Subió La Temperatura" (with Lismar)	2024	Non-album promotional singles

== Other charted and certified songs ==
List of other charted songs
Title	Year	Peak chart positions							Certifications	Album
Title	Year	ARG	BOL	PAR	PER	SPA	URU	WW Excl. US	Certifications	Album
"Bzrp Freestyle Sessions, Vol. 6" (with Trueno)	2021	—	—	—	—	—	—	—	PROMUSICAE: Platinum	Non-album song
"Malbec" (Duki with Bizarrap)	2021	17	—	56	—	29	—	—	AMPROFON: Gold; PROMUSICAE: 3× Platinum	Desde el Fin del Mundo
"Bottas" (with Arcángel and Duki)	2022	80	—	—	—	79	—	—		Sr. Santos
"Toy en el Mic" (with Milo J)	2023	15	24	—	24	40	14	127	PROFOVI: Gold; AMPROFON: Gold	En Dormir sin Madrid
"No Soy Eterno" (with Milo J)	2023	21	18	—	22	46	—	128	PROFOVI: Gold; AMPROFON: Gold	En Dormir sin Madrid
"Penas de Antaño" (with Milo J)	2023	31	—	—	—	63	—	—		En Dormir sin Madrid
"La Fuerte" (with Shakira)	2024	95	—	—	—	67	—	—	RIAA: Gold (Latin)	Las Mujeres Ya No Lloran
"Buscarte Lejos" (with Duki)	2024	17	—	—	—	24	—	—		Ameri
"Boobytrap" (with Myke Towers)	2026	—	—	—	—	88	—	—		Non-album single
"—" denotes a recording that did not chart or was not released in that territory.

== Remixes ==
2017

- "No Vendo Trap (Bizarrap remix)"
- "21334 (Bizarrap remix)"
- "Legend (Bizarrap remix)"
- "Escalera Real (Bizarrap remix)" (with Kódigo)
- "Tetrix (Bizarrap remix)" (with Jeeiph)

2018

- "Buho (Bizarrap remix)"
- "Amorfoda (remix)" (with Xovox)
- "Loca (Bizarrap remix)"
- "Wanda Nara (Bizarrap remix)"
- "Antes Que Sea Tarde (Bizarrap remix)" (with Estani)
- "S.A.D. (remix)"
- "Fvck Luv (Bizarrap remix)"

2019

- "Aturdido (remix)" (with Zanto and Halpe)
- "My Own (Bzrp remix)" (with Kyotto featuring Coscu)

== Other songs produced ==
List of other songs produced, with performing artists, showing year released, certifications and album name
Title	Year	Other artist(s)	Album
"Plegarias"	2019	Nicki Nicole	Recuerdos
"Colocao"	2020	Nicki Nicole	Parte de Mí
"Yankee"	2020	Smokk featuring Joaqo, Lit Killah and Big Deiv	Non-album singles
"Un Flow de Infarto"	2020	Ysy A	Non-album singles
"Pantera"	2020	Kódigo	Non-album singles
"Malbec"	2021	Duki	Desde el Fin del Mundo
"La Fuerte"	2024	Shakira	Las Mujeres Ya No Lloran
"The Moon Cave"	2026	Gorillaz featuring Asha Puthli, Bobby Womack, Dave Jolicoeur, Jalen Ngonda, and Black Thought	The Mountain
"Orange County"	2026	Gorillaz featuring Bizarrap, Kara Jackson & Anoushka Shankar	The Mountain

== Footnotes ==
Notes for peak chart positions
