= 27th Annual Premios Gardel =

2025 edition of Argentine award ceremony

- Date: 18 June 2025
- Location: Teatro Coliseo; Buenos Aires, Argentina
- Hosted by: Gabriela Radice

Highlights
- Most awards: Ca7riel & Paco Amoroso (4)
- Most nominations: Luck Ra (9)
- Website: premiosgardel.org.ar

Television/radio coverage
- Network: TNT Latam; HBO Max

The 27th Annual Premios Gardel honored the best recordings, compositions, and artists from 1 January to 31 December 2024, as chosen by the members of Argentine Chamber of Phonograms and Videograms Producers, on 18 June 2025, at the Teatro Coliseo in Buenos Aires, Argentina. The ceremony was hosted by Argentine journalist Gabriela Radice and was broadcast on the television channels TNT Latam and HBO Max.

Nominations were announced on 24 April 2025. Singer Luck Ra led the nominations with nine, followed by Milo J and Bizarrap, both with eight each; Trueno and Airbag, each with seven, and Nicki Nicole with six. Ca7riel & Paco Amoroso were the most awarded artist of the ceremony with four awards, followed by Trueno and Lali with three wins each.

== Background ==
=== Category changes ===
Three new categories were introduced: Best Pop/Rock Album, Best Pop/Rock Song, and Best RKT Song. The categories for Best Cuarteto Group Album and Best Chamamé Album were not presented, with Chamamé albums being included in the Folk categories. The exclusion of the latter category was met with negative critiques, with musician Chango Spasiuk calling the decision "worrying".

== Winners and nominees ==
The nominations were announced on 24 April 2025.

=== General Field ===
General Field
Album of the Year: Baño María – Ca7riel & Paco Amoroso; 166 – Milo J; El Último Baile – Trueno; Por cesárea – Dillom; La Lógica del Escorpión – Charly García
Song of the Year: "Fanático" – Lali; Mariana Espósito, Mauro De Tommaso, Federico Barreto, Isabela Teran Lieban, Juan Giménez Kuj & Martín D'Agosto, songwriters; "En Otra Vida" – Yami Safdie & Lasso; Yamila Safdie, Andres Vicente Lazo Uslar & Gonzalo Ferreyra, songwriters; "Imán (Two of Us)" – María Becerra; María de los Ángeles Becerra, Elvira Anderfjärd, Richard Zastenker & Xavier Rossero, songwriters; "Hola Perdida" – Luck Ra & Khea; Facundo Almenara Ordóñez, Ivo Alfredo Thomas Serue, Javier Sanglerman & Renzo Luca Chiumiento, songwriters; "Luck Ra: Bzrp Music Sessions, Vol. 61" – Bizarrap & Luck Ra; Gonzalo Julián Conde, Facundo Almenara Ordóñez, Paulo Ezequiel Dybala, Renzo Luca Chiumiento & Santiago Alvarado, songwriters; "Verte de Cerca" – Airbag; Gastón Faustino Sardelli, Guido Armido Sardelli & Patricio Máximo Sardelli, songwriters; "Cirugía" – Dillom; "3 Pecados Después..." – Milo J; Camilo Joaquin Villaruel, Francisco Zecca & Lisandro Casquero, songwriters; "Real Gangsta Love" – Trueno; Mateo Palacios Corazzina, Luis Federico Vindver Arosa & Santiago Gabriel Ruiz, songwriters; "Ojos Verdes" – Nicki Nicole; Nicole Denise Cucco, Édgar Barrera, Julia Lewis, Daniel Melero, Santiago Ruiz & Sara Schell, songwriters; "Mi Primer Amor" – Luciano Pereyra; Luciano Pereyra, Andrés Castro & Patrick Ingunza, songwriters
Record of the Year: "Real Gangsta Love" – Trueno; Tatool & Federico Vindver, producers; Tatool, Lewis Pickett, Dave Kutch, Salvador Majail, Santiago Alvarado, Brian Taylor, Big One & Federico Vindver, recording engineers; "Ojos Verdes" – Nicki Nicole; Tatool, producer; Tatool, Luis Barrera Jr. & Dave Kutch, recording engineers; "Arruinarse" – Tan Biónica featuring Airbag; Bambi, producer; Eduardo Pereyra & Daniel Ovie, recording engineers; "Luck Ra: Bzrp Music Sessions, Vol. 61" – Bizarrap & Luck Ra; Bizarrap, producer; Gonzalo Julian Conde, Renzo Luca Chiumiento & Luca Fortu, recording engineers)
| Best New Artist: Olivia Wald; K40S; Dum Chica; Margarita; Juana Rozas | Collaboration of the Year: "Agua" – Ca7riel & Paco Amoroso & Tini; "Es Ahora" – Abel Pintos & Luciano Pereyra; "Hola Perdida" – Luck Ra & Khea; "Arruinarse" – Tan Biónica featuring Airbag; "Luck Ra: Bzrp Music Sessions, Vol. 61" – Bizarrap & Luck Ra; "Ahí Ahí (Remix)" – El Negro Tecla, DJ Tao, Pablo Lescano, L-Gante & La T y La M; "En Otra Vida" – Yami Safdie & Lasso |

=== Pop ===
Pop
| Best Pop Album: Momentos – Nahuel Pennisi; Mejor Que Ayer – Diego Torres; Vuelve – Axel; Un Mechón de Pelo – Tini | Best Pop Song: "Fanático" – Lali; "Pa" – Tini; "Imán (Two of Us)" – María Becerra; "En Otra Vida" – Yami Safdie & Lasso; "Es Ahora" – Abel Pintos & Luciano Pereyra; "La_Playlist.mpeg" – Emilia |
| Best Pop Group Album: Muchachos – La Mosca Tsé - Tsé; Hipnótica – Hipnótica; Arco y Flecha – Mi Amigo Invencible | Best Traditional Pop Album: As de Corazones – Eddie Sierra; Laura Esquivel – Laura Esquivel; Acércate Más – Dany Martin |
| Best Urban Pop Album: Baño María – Ca7riel & Paco Amoroso; Modales – Yami Safdie; Gotti A – Tiago PZK | Best Urban Pop Song: "Agora" – María Becerra; "Aprender a Amar" – Nathy Peluso; "noviogangsta <3" – Emilia; "La Cueva" – Cazzu; "A Vos" – Milo J |

=== Rock ===
Rock
| Best Rock Album: La Lógica del Escorpión – Charly García; Herencia Lebón – David Lebón; Hija de Ruta – Lucy Patane | Best Rock Song: "Yo Ya Sé" – Charly García; "Buenos Tiempos" – Dillom; "Lío" – Eruca Sativa; "Anarquía en Buenos Aires" – Airbag; "Pasos al Costado" – Turf & Milo J |
| Best Rock Group Album: Nueve – Massacre; Cocoliche Life – Bersuit Vergarabat; Esencia – Cruzando el Charco | Best Hard Rock Album: Pase Lo Que Pase – Arde la Sangre; Súper Premium Ultra – Dum Chica; El Diablo – Horcas |
| Best Pop/Rock Album: Jet Love – Conociendo Rusia; Salvando las Distancias – Benjamín Amadeo; Marttein – Marttein; Un Verano – Un Verano | Best Pop/Rock Song: "Arruinarse" – Tan Biónica featuring Airbag; "La Renta" – SER & Paty Cantú; "Cristal" – Indios; "De Abajo para Arriba" – Un Verano; "Verte de Cerca" – Airbag; "No Entiendo Si es Amor" – El Zar |

=== Urban & Reggae ===
Urban & Reggae
| Best Urban Album: El Último Baile – Trueno; Ameri – Duki; Naiki – Nicki Nicole; 166 – Milo J; En Dormir sin Madrid (Deluxe) – Bizarrap & Milo J | Best Urban Song: "Real Gangsta Love" – Trueno; "3 Pecados Después..." – Milo J; "Young Miko: Bzrp Music Sessions, Vol. 58" – Bizarrap & Young Miko; "Cuando Te Vi" – Big One, María Becerra & Trueno; "Mascara" – Nicki Nicole & Duki |
| Best Urban Collaboration: "Todo Roto" – Nathy Peluso & Ca7riel & Paco Amoroso; "We Love That Shit" – Nicki Nicole & Khea; "Alegría" – Tiago PZK, Anitta & Emilia; "Young Miko: Bzrp Music Sessions, Vol. 58" – Bizarrap & Young Miko; "Cuando Te Vi" – Big One, María Becerra & Trueno | Best Reggae/Ska Album: Hecho en Jamaica – Nonpalidece; Tuli – Señor Flavio; Forever – Dancing Mood; Rocker – Riddim |

=== Tango, Jazz, Classical & Instrumental ===
Tango, Jazz, Classical & Instrumental
| Best Tango Album: Pratanguero: 3° Esquina, La Que Se Alumbra – Ariel Prat; Contrapunto: Tangos de Eladia Blázquez y Astor Piazzolla – Mariana Quinteros; ¿Y el Fin del Amor? – Mariana Mazú | Best Tango Song: "Tormenta" – Lidia Borda & Daniel Godfrid; "Pesar" – Melingo & Pity Álvarez; "La Vida del Brujo" – Sexteto Fantasma |
| Best Instrumental Tango Orchestra/Group Album: Costero Criollo – Noelia Sinkunas, Milagros Caliva; La Marca – Orquesta de Tango del Falla; Neotípico – Ramiro Boero | Best Instrumental/Fusion/World Music Album: Yvy Purahéi – Los Nuñez; Diez Piezas Breves para Armónica Cromática – Franco Luciani; La Noche – Lidia Borda & Daniel Godfrid |
| Best Jazz Album: Gardel – Hernán Jacinto; Becoming Human – Roxana Amed; Volumen 2 – Ligia Piro | Best Classical Album: Parotti, Obras para Violín Solo Vol. 2 – Elías Gurevich; Ámbar Púrpura - Música Sinfónica, de Cámara y Para Solistas Vol III – Guillo Espel; Escrito sobre Escrito sobre Escrito – Compañía Oblicua y Marcelo Delgado |

=== Folk ===
Folk
| Best Folklore Album: Legado Popular I y II – Peteco Carabajal; Soy Milonga, Romance de la Llanura – Casiana Torres; Que Sea con Suerte – Soledad; Mil Noches – Juan Fuentes | Best Folklore Song: "Siempre a la Misma Hora" – Teresa Parodi; "Como un Tren" – Juan Fuentes & León Gieco; "Mi Última Carta" – Los Nocheros & Chaqueño Palavecino; "De la Forestal" – Patricia Gómez Grupo; "Raza Morena" – Flor Paz |
Best Folklore Group Album: A los Amores - El Folklórico Vol. 1 – Duratierra; Sinfónico – Destino San Javier; Nocheros en la Mesa – Los Nocheros

=== Tropical & Cuarteto ===
Tropical & Cuarteto
| Best Tropical/Cumbia Album: Tu Patrona de Lujo – La Joaqui; Celda 4 – L-Gante; Conmigo Te Gustó – Nico Mattioli | Best Cuarteto Album: Que Nos Falte Todo – Luck Ra; Pisando Firme – Ulises Bueno; Serie Favorita – La K'onga; De Córdoba Pal Mundo – Eugenia Quevedo; BXXI: Fiesta Cuartetera en el Luna Park – Banda XXI |
| Best Tropical/Cumbia Song: "Perdonarte, ¿Para Qué?" – Los Ángeles Azules & Emilia; "Dice Que No Le Importa" – La Delio Valdez & Los Palmeras; "Piel" – Tiago PZK & Ke Personajes; "Amor de Vago" – La T y La M & Malandro; "Hoy" – Valentino Merlo & The La Planta; "Si un Día Estás Sola" – Emanero, Valentino Merlo & Big One; "Te Amo" – Fer Vázquez & Flor Alvarez; "Ojos Verdes" – Nicki Nicole | Best Cuarteto Song: "Hola Perdida" – Luck Ra & Khea; "Mil Preguntas" – Q'Lokura & Luck Ra; "Luck Ra: Bzrp Music Sessions, Vol. 61" – Bizarrap & Luck Ra; "Fama de Diabla" – La K'onga, David Bisbal & Emanero; "No Podrás - En Vivo" – Eugenia Quevedo |
| Best Tropical/Cumbia Group Album: Messirve Mix 9 – La T y La M; Uriel Lozano: Sin Miedo Session #44 (Lado S) – Sin Miedo, Uriel Lozano; Aprendí – Lemonchamp | Best RKT Song: "San Turrona" – La Joaqui; "Gitano" – Ponte Perro & Doble P; "Tal Para Cual" – Salastkbron & Omar Varela; "Suelta" – Callejero Fino; "Antes Que Me Vaya" – L-Gante |

=== Alternative & Dance/Electronic ===
Alternative & Dance/Electronic
| Best Alternative Pop Album: Maquillada en la Cama – Juliana Gattas; Grasa – Nathy Peluso; Cursi – Zoe Gotusso | Best Alternative Rock Album: Por cesárea – Dillom; Correntada – El Plan de la Mariposa; De Fábrica (Versión Extendida) – Florian; Ultracromático – Daniel Melero; No Hagas Que Me Arrepienta – Winona Riders |
| Best Alternative Folklore Album: 11Puerta3 – Abi González; Pu Ko/Aguas – Anahi Rayen Mariluan; Alterego – Franco Ramírez | Best Electronic Music Album: Artificial – Peces Raros; Dualidad – Malena Narvay; R333MIX – Evlay; Satisfire – Six Sex |

=== Live, Music Video, Visual Media & Children's ===
Live, Music Video, Visual Media & Children's
Best Live Album: La Última Noche Mágica en Vivo - Estadio River Plate – Tan Biónica; Q'LOKURA / Zapada EN VIVO en UN POCO DE RUIDO! – Pinky SD, Un Poco de Ruido, Q'Lokura; 18 (En Vivo Estadio de Morón) – Milo J; Airbag - En Vivo Estadio Vélez – Airbag; BAÑO MARÍA (En Vivo - Buenos Aires) – Ca7riel & Paco Amoroso
| Best Music Video: "Fanático" – Lautaro Espósito & Lali, directors (Lali); "MVP" – Agustín Portela & Manuel Pons, directors (L-Gante); "Pa" – Barbara Ferré, director (Tini); "Arruinarse (En Vivo en River Plate)" – Andrea Ussher, director (Tan Biónica featuring Airbag) | Best Long Form Music Video: Baño María – Brian Kazez, director (Ca7riel & Paco Amoroso); "Intro" + "3 Pecados" + "Ni Carlos Ni José" – Santiago Perfetto, director (Milo J); Mercedes Sosa en New York, 1974 – Martín Benchimol, director (Mercedes Sosa); La Última Noche Mágica en Vivo - Estadio River Plate – Andrea Ussher & Agustin Svarz, directors (Tan Biónica); Luna en Obras – Hernan Marino, director (Marilina Bertoldi); Un Mechón de Pelo – Terrivle & Bàrbara Farré, directors (Tini) |
| Best Cinema/Television/Audiovisual Production Soundtrack Album: Pedro Páramo (Banda Sonora de la Serie de Netflix) – Gustavo Santaolalla; Cromañón (Música de la Serie Original de Amazon Prime) – Gabriel Pedernera, Santiago Motorizado, Lucy Patane, Mujer Cebra, Olivia Nuss, Santiago Rovito, Alan Madanes, Lautaro LR; El Encargado 3 – Alejandro Kauderer, Ignacio Gabriel; Margarita, Que Tu Cuente Valga la Pena – Margarita | Best Children's Music Album: Margarita, Que Tu Cuento Valga la Pena – Margarita; Cumpleaños – Pim Pau; Buscapie – Luis Pescetti, Juan Quintero |

=== Package, Concept, Historical & Singer-Songwriter ===
Package, Concept, Historical & Singer-Songwriter
| Best Cover Design: Baño María – Terrivle, Iván Resnik, Valentina Luppino & El Ovbio, designers (Ca7riel & Paco Amoroso); Quiero Mejor – Omar Souto & Nora Lozano, designers (Kevin Johansen); La Lógica del Escorpión – Renata Schussheim & Martín Gorricho, designers (Charly García); Súper Premium Ultra – Nano Benayon, designer (Dum Chica) | Best Concept Album: Atahualpa Yupanqui en Michigan – Atahualpa Yupanqui; Hilda Canta Charly – Hilda Lizarazu & Lito Vitale; Éxtasis Total - Las Canciones de los Abuelos de la Nada – Cachorro López; Por cesárea – Dillom |
| Best Catallog Collection Album: Mercedes Sosa en New York, 1974 – Mercedes Sosa; Canciones para Cantar en el Cordón de la Vereda – Miguel Abuelo; Música del Alma – Charly García | Best Singer-Songwriter Album: Quiero Mejor – Kevin Johansen; Ese Fuego – Luna Sujatovich; REC or Dando – María Pien |

=== Production & Engineering ===
Production & Engineering
| Producer of the Year: Gustavo Santaolalla; Bizarrap; Nico Cotton; Gonzalo Moreno Charpentier (Bambi) | Best Recording Engineering: Baño María – Federico Vindver, Pipe Bernal, Sean Jones, Lewis Pickett, Sir Nolan, XAY, Maxi Espíndola, CA7RIEL, SlowMike, Casta, Camilo Zea & Manuel Gattoni, recording engineers (Ca7riel & Paco Amoroso); Por cesárea – Santiago De Simone, Ruben Ordoñez, Fermín Ugarte & Luis Tomás La Madrid, recording engineers (Dillom); Hecho en Jamaica – Adrian Alberto Pagliano, recording engineer (Nonpalidece); Quiero Mejor – Panda Elliot, Marcelo "Coca" Monte, Augusto Flores, Manuel Gattoni, Matías Scheinkman, Josep Castelló & Carlos Laurenz, recording engineers (Kevin Johansen); Maquillada en la Cama – Alex Anwandter & Guillermo Mandrafina, recording engineers (Juliana Gattas); De Fábrica (Versión Extendida) – Augusto Flores, Manuel Gattoni, Gustavo Borner, Thea Prevalsky, Riley Finkle, Mateo Rodó, Sebastián Bergallo, Martín Bergallo, recording engineers (Florian) |

== Multiple nominations and awards ==
The following received multiple nominations:

Nine

- Luck Ra

Eight

- Milo J
- Bizarrap

Seven

- Trueno
- Airbag

Six

- Nicki Nicole

Five

- Dillom
- Ca7riel & Paco Amoroso
- María Becerra

Four

- Charly García
- Yami Safdie
- Khea
- Big One
- Tan Biónica
- Emilia

Three

- Nathy Peluso
- Lasso
- Lali
- Luciano Pereyra
- L-Gante
- Tini
- Margarita
- Tiago PZK
