= List of Billboard Argentina Hot 100 top-ten singles in 2021 =

This is a list of singles that charted in the top ten of the Billboard Argentina Hot 100 chart in 2021.

== Top-ten singles ==
Key

- ◁ – indicates single's top 10 entry was also its Hot 100 debut

List of Billboard Hot 100 top ten singles that peaked in 2021
Top ten entry date	Single	Artist(s)	Peak	Peak date	Weeks in top ten	Ref.
Singles from 2020
December 6	"Si Me Tomo Una Cerveza"	Migrantes, Oscu and Rombai featuring Agapornis and Alico (Note: Oscu, Rombai and Agapornis started being credited as a co-lead or featured artists from the week ending January 24, 2021.)	1	January 24	18	
December 27	"Bebé" (Note: The single re-entered the top ten on the week ending April 11, 2021.)	Camilo and El Alfa	4	January 24	13	
Singles from 2021
January 3	"L-Gante Rkt" (Note: The single re-entered the top ten on the week ending February 14, 2021.)	Papu DJ and L-Gante	2	January 10	16	
January 24	"Bandido"	Myke Towers and Juhn	1	January 31	16	
January 31	"Animal"	María Becerra and Cazzu	5	February 14	10	
February 7	"Ropa Cara"	Camilo	4	February 14	6	
February 28	"La Noche de Anoche"	Bad Bunny and Rosalía	3	March 7	9	
March 7	"Ella No Es Tuya (Remix)"	Rochy RD, Myke Towers and Nicki Nicole	2	March 14	9	
March 14	"Además de Mí (Remix)"	Rusherking, Khea and Duki featuring Tiago PZK, María Becerra and Lit Killah	1	March 21	15	
March 21	"Confiésalo"	María Becerra and Rusherking	7	March 21	1	
March 28	"L-Gante: Bzrp Music Sessions, Vol. 38"	Bizarrap and L-Gante	1	March 28	11	
March 28	"Acaramelao"	María Becerra	4	April 18	13	
April 11	"911"	Sech	7	April 11	5	
April 11	"Baila Conmigo"	Selena Gomez and Rauw Alejandro	8	May 2	4	
April 18	"Wacha"	Khea and Duki	3	April 18	6	
May 2	"Pistola (Remix)"	L-Gante, DT Bilardo and El Más Ladrón featuring Damas Gratis	2	May 9	5	
May 2	"Fiel" (Note: The single re-entered the top ten on the week ending June 27, 2021.)	Los Legendarios, Wisin and Jhay Cortez	8	May 9	6	
May 9	"Pareja del Año"	Sebastián Yatra and Myke Towers	2	May 16	14	
May 9	"Perrito Malvado"	Damas Gratis featuring L-Gante and Marita	6	June 6	6	
May 16	"Miénteme"	Tini and María Becerra	1	May 16	22	
May 16	"AM" (Note: The single re-entered the top ten on the week ending July 4, 2021.)	Nio Garcia, Bad Bunny and J Balvin (Note: Bad Bunny and J Balvin started being credited as co-lead artists from the week ending July 4, 2021.)	6	May 23	11	
May 30	"Te Necesito"	Khea and María Becerra	3	May 30	5	
June 6	"Butter"	BTS	7	June 6	1	
June 6	"Ram Pam Pam"	Natti Natasha and Becky G	6	June 13	5	
June 13	"Todo de Ti"	Rauw Alejandro	1	June 27	18	
June 13	"Qué Más Pues?" ◁	J Balvin and María Becerra	1	June 20	20	
June 20	"Yonaguni" ◁	Bad Bunny	5	June 27	6	
June 20	"El Makinon"	Karol G and Mariah Angeliq	9	June 20	1	
June 27	"Cazame" (Note: The single re-entered the top ten on the week ending July 18, 2021.)	Maria Becerra and Tiago PZK	6	June 27	3	
June 27	"Eladio Carrión: Bzrp Music Sessions, Vol. 40"	Bizarrap and Eladio Carrión	10	June 27	1	
July 4	"No Me Conocen (Remix)"	Bandido, Duki and Rei featuring Tiago PZK	1	July 25	18	
July 4	"2:50 (Remix)"	MYA, Tini and Duki	3	July 11	13	
July 11	"Nicky Jam: Bzrp Music Sessions, Vol. 41" ◁	Bizarrap and Nicky Jam	1	July 18	6	
July 11	"Save Your Tears"	The Weeknd and Ariana Grande	8	July 11	1	
July 25	"Entre Nosotros" (Note: The single re-entered the top ten on the week ending January 16, 2022.)	Tiago PZK and Lit Killah (Note: María Becerra and Nicki Nicole started being credited as co-lead artists from the week ending January 16, 2022.)	1	August 8	37	
August 1	"Como Si No Importara"	Emilia and Duki	3	August 8	12	
August 15	"Mi Debilidad"	María Becerra	8	August 22	5	
August 15	"YaMeFui"	Bizarrap, Duki and Nicki Nicole	9	August 15	4	
August 22	"Malianteo 420 (Volumen 2)" ◁	L-Gante and DT.Bilardo	10	August 22	1	
August 29	"Pepas" (Note: The single re-entered the top ten on the week ending December 5, 2021.) (Note: The single re-entered the top ten on the week ending December 19, 2021.) (Note: The single re-entered the top ten on the week ending January 2, 2022.)	Farruko	3	October 3	17	
September 12	"Wow Wow" (Note: The single re-entered the top ten on the week ending January 2, 2022.)	María Becerra featuring Becky G	2	September 26	15	
September 19	"Turraka (Remix)"	Kaleb di Masi and Blunted Vato featuring Ecko and Papichamp	1	September 26	17	
October 3	"Mal Acostumbrao" (Note: The single re-entered the top ten on the week ending November 28, 2021.) (Note: The single re-entered the top ten on the week ending December 12, 2021.)	Mau y Ricky and María Becerra	5	October 10	9	
October 17	"Rápido Lento"	Emilia and Tiago PZK	2	October 31	15	
October 17	"Ya No Llora"	Maluma	8	October 17	2	
October 24	"Antes de Ti"	Rusherking and María Becerra	3	November 7	12	
October 31	"Índigo"	Camilo and Evaluna Montaner	5	November 14	9	
October 31	"Turreo Sessions #5"	DJ Tao and Kaleb di Masi	6	November 7	7	
November 7	"Salimo de Noche"	Tiago PZK and Trueno	1	November 14	15	
November 14	"Anuel AA: Bzrp Music Sessions, Vol. 46" ◁	Bizarrap and Anuel AA	7	November 14	1	
November 21	"Bar" ◁	Tini and L-Gante	1	November 28	20	
December 5	"Dance Crip"	Trueno	3	December 19	13	

=== 2020 peaks ===
List of Billboard Hot 100 top ten singles in 2021 that peaked in 2020
Top ten entry date	Single	Artist(s)	Peak	Peak date	Weeks in top ten	Ref.
August 30	"Hawái" (Note: The single re-entered the top ten on the week ending March 21, 2021.)	Maluma and The Weeknd (Note: The Weeknd started being credited as a co-lead artist from the week ending November 15, 2020.)	1	September 6	29	
October 11	"Vida de Rico"	Camilo	1	November 8	20	
November 8	"Bésame"	El Reja and Lira	3	November 15	12	
November 22	"Dákiti"	Bad Bunny and Jhay Cortez	1	December 6	15	
November 29	"Bichota"	Karol G	1	December 20	19	
December 6	"Chica Ideal"	Sebastián Yatra and Guaynaa	8	December 13	7	
December 13	"Nathy Peluso: Bzrp Music Sessions, Vol. 36"	Bizarrap and Nathy Peluso	4	December 13	9	

=== 2022 peaks ===
List of Billboard Hot 100 top ten singles in 2021 that peaked in 2022
Top ten entry date	Single	Artist(s)	Peak	Peak date	Weeks in top ten	Ref.
December 19	"Tacones Rojos" (Note: The single re-entered the top ten on the week ending February 20, 2022.)	Sebastián Yatra	7	January 9	8	
December 26	"BB"	MYA and Emilia	4	January 2	9	

== See also ==
- List of Billboard Argentina Hot 100 number-one singles of 2021

== Notes ==
Notes for re-entries
