= List of Billboard Argentina Hot 100 number-one singles of 2021 =

The Billboard Argentina Hot 100 is a chart that ranks the best-performing songs in the Argentina. Its data, published by Billboard Argentina and Billboard magazines and compiled by Nielsen SoundScan and BMAT/Vericast, is based collectively on each song's weekly physical and digital sales, as well as the amount of airplay received on Argentine radio stations and TV and streaming on online digital music outlets.

== Chart history ==
No.	Issue date	Song	Artist(s)	Ref.
19	January 3	"Bichota"	Karol G	
19	January 10	"Bichota"	Karol G	
19	January 17	"Bichota"	Karol G	
20	January 24	"Si Me Tomo Una Cerveza"	Migrantes, Oscu and Rombai featuring Agapornis and Alico	
21	January 31	"Bandido"	Myke Towers and Juhn	
21	February 7	"Bandido"	Myke Towers and Juhn	
21	February 14	"Bandido"	Myke Towers and Juhn	
21	February 21	"Bandido"	Myke Towers and Juhn	
21	February 28	"Bandido"	Myke Towers and Juhn	
21	March 7	"Bandido"	Myke Towers and Juhn	
21	March 14	"Bandido"	Myke Towers and Juhn	
22	March 21	"Además de Mi (Remix)"	Rusherking, Duki and Khea featuring María Becerra, Lit Killah and Tiago PZK	
23	March 28	"L-Gante: Bzrp Music Sessions, Vol. 38"	Bizarrap and L-Gante	
23	April 4	"L-Gante: Bzrp Music Sessions, Vol. 38"	Bizarrap and L-Gante	
23	April 11	"L-Gante: Bzrp Music Sessions, Vol. 38"	Bizarrap and L-Gante	
23	April 18	"L-Gante: Bzrp Music Sessions, Vol. 38"	Bizarrap and L-Gante	
23	April 25	"L-Gante: Bzrp Music Sessions, Vol. 38"	Bizarrap and L-Gante	
23	May 2	"L-Gante: Bzrp Music Sessions, Vol. 38"	Bizarrap and L-Gante	
23	May 9	"L-Gante: Bzrp Music Sessions, Vol. 38"	Bizarrap and L-Gante	
24	May 16	"Miénteme"	Tini and María Becerra	
24	May 23	"Miénteme"	Tini and María Becerra	
24	May 30	"Miénteme"	Tini and María Becerra	
24	June 6	"Miénteme"	Tini and María Becerra	
24	June 13	"Miénteme"	Tini and María Becerra	
24	June 20	"Miénteme"	Tini and María Becerra	
25	June 27	"Todo de Ti"	Rauw Alejandro	
26	July 4	"¿Qué Más, Pues?"	J Balvin and María Becerra	
26	July 11	"¿Qué Más, Pues?"	J Balvin and María Becerra	
27	July 18	"Nicky Jam: Bzrp Music Sessions, Vol. 41"	Bizarrap and Nicky Jam	
28	July 25	"No Me Conocen (Remix)"	Bandido, Duki and Rei featuring Tiago PZK	
28	August 1	"No Me Conocen (Remix)"	Bandido, Duki and Rei featuring Tiago PZK	
29	August 8	"Entre nosotros"	Tiago PZK and Lit Killah	
29	August 15	"Entre nosotros"	Tiago PZK and Lit Killah	
29	August 22	"Entre nosotros"	Tiago PZK and Lit Killah	
29	August 29	"Entre nosotros"	Tiago PZK and Lit Killah	
29	September 5	"Entre nosotros"	Tiago PZK and Lit Killah	
29	September 12	"Entre nosotros"	Tiago PZK and Lit Killah	
29	September 19	"Entre nosotros"	Tiago PZK and Lit Killah	
30	September 26	"Turraka (Remix)"	Kaleb di Masi and Blunted Vato featuring Ecko and Papichamp	
30	October 3	"Turraka (Remix)"	Kaleb di Masi and Blunted Vato featuring Ecko and Papichamp	
30	October 10	"Turraka (Remix)"	Kaleb di Masi and Blunted Vato featuring Ecko and Papichamp	
30	October 17	"Turraka (Remix)"	Kaleb di Masi and Blunted Vato featuring Ecko and Papichamp	
30	October 24	"Turraka (Remix)"	Kaleb di Masi and Blunted Vato featuring Ecko and Papichamp	
30	October 31	"Turraka (Remix)"	Kaleb di Masi and Blunted Vato featuring Ecko and Papichamp	
30	November 7	"Turraka (Remix)"	Kaleb di Masi and Blunted Vato featuring Ecko and Papichamp	
30	November 14	"Turraka (Remix)"	Kaleb di Masi and Blunted Vato featuring Ecko and Papichamp	
31	November 21	"Salimo de Noche"	Tiago PZK and Trueno	
32	November 28	"Bar"	Tini and L-Gante	
32	December 5	"Bar"	Tini and L-Gante	
32	December 12	"Bar"	Tini and L-Gante	
32	December 19	"Bar"	Tini and L-Gante	
32	December 26	"Bar"	Tini and L-Gante	

== See also ==
- List of Billboard Argentina Hot 100 top-ten singles in 2021
