= Natanael Cano: Bzrp Music Sessions, Vol. 59 =

Single by Bizarrap and Natanael Cano
- Language: Spanish
- B-side: "Entre Las de 20"
- Released: 3 April 2024
- Recorded: 2021–2023
- Studio: Bzrp Studio (Argentina)
- Genre: Latin trap
- Length: 2:35
- Label: Dale Play
- Composers: Gonzalo Julián Conde; Natanael Rubén Cano Monge; Santiago Álvarado; Renzo Luca; Alexis Fierro; Daniel Sánchez; Ángel Alejandro Almaguer
- Producer: Bizarrap

Bizarrap singles chronology
"Young Miko: Bzrp Music Sessions, Vol. 58" (2024)	"Natanael Cano: Bzrp Music Sessions, Vol. 59" / "Entre las de 20" (2024)	"Lismar: Bzrp Music Sessions, Vol. 60" (2024)

Natanael Cano singles chronology
"El Boss" (2024)	"Natanael Cano: Bzrp Music Sessions, Vol. 59" / "Entre las de 20" (2024)	"300 Noches" (2024)

Music video
- "Natanael Cano: Bzrp Music Sessions, Vol. 59 on YouTube

"Natanael Cano: Bzrp Music Sessions, Vol. 59" (also titled "Endiamantado") is a song by Argentine DJ Bizarrap and Mexican singer Natanael Cano. It was released on 3 April 2023 through Dale Play, as part of the former's "Bzrp Music Sessions" series. The session was released along with another song titled "Entre las de 20".

== Background and release ==
In 2021, prior to the release of his 47th music session with Spanish rapper Morad, Bizarrap said in an interview with Billboard that he wanted to collaborate with Natanael Cano on a music session and had already spoken to him. After both of them met, they began recording the music session in 2021, but it had multiple changes by 2022 and therefore was not released after. During an Instagram live video, Bizarrap said that there were "a thousand" versions of the session, where some lyrics had to be changed.

Following his 58th session with Young Miko, as well as several leaks, he would announce his 59th music session where Natanael Cano would be featured. Prior to the announcement, it was speculated that both would collaborate since Bizarrap congratulated Cano on his 23rd birthday and Cano shared a photo with him on the same day. The session was released on 3 April 2024, along with a surprise track titled "Entre las de 20"; both tracks were released as separate singles, and were also formed as a 2-track EP.

== Composition ==
The music session is a Latin trap song, with elements of acoustic guitar. Lyrically, Cano calls out the Mexican government for the criticism of corridos tumbados, saying that if they have a problem, he would "leave in his jet." Cano also makes references to Mexican drug lord Rafael Caro Quintero. The song also contains vocals by Alexis Fierro, a songwriter in the genre well known as El Chachito, who also co-wrote the music session.

== Music video ==
Its music video was released on the same day of the single's release. The video is split in two chapters; "Endiamantado" is the music session and "Entre las de 20" is a surprise track.

== Charts ==
Chart performance for "Natanael Cano: Bzrp Music Sessions, Vol. 59"
Chart (2024)	Peak position
Argentina Hot 100 (Billboard)	40
Global 200 (Billboard)	26
Mexico (Billboard)	2
Spain (PROMUSICAE)	42
US Hot Latin Songs (Billboard)	20
