= Entre las de 20 =

Single by Bizarrap and Natanael Cano
- Language: Spanish
- Released: 3 April 2024
- Genre: Regional Mexican
- Length: 2:48
- Label: Dale Play
- Composers: Gonzalo Julián Conde; Natanael Rubén Cano Monge; Santiago Álvarado; Ángel Alejandro Almaguer
- Producer: Bizarrap

Bizarrap singles chronology
"Young Miko: Bzrp Music Sessions, Vol. 58" (2024)	"Natanael Cano: Bzrp Music Sessions, Vol. 59" / "Entre las de 20" (2024)	"Lismar: Bzrp Music Sessions, Vol. 60" (2024)

Natanael Cano singles chronology
"El Boss" (2024)	"Natanael Cano: Bzrp Music Sessions, Vol. 59" / "Entre las de 20" (2024)	"300 Noches" (2024)

Music video
- "Entre las de 20" on YouTube

"Entre las de 20" (transl. "Among those of 20") is a song by Argentine DJ Bizarrap and Mexican singer Natanael Cano. It was released on 3 April 2024 through Dale Play, along with "Natanael Cano: Bzrp Music Sessions, Vol. 59" as its surprise track.

== Background and release ==
Following Bizarrap's 58th session with Young Miko, he would announce his 59th music session where Natanael Cano would be featured; it was already speculated through Bizarrap congratulating Cano on his 23rd birthday and Cano sharing a photo with him on the same day. Before the session was officially released, both artists confirmed that another song would be released simultaneously. The music session was released on 3 April 2024, along with the confirmed surprise track "Entre las de 20"; both tracks were released as separate singles and were also formed as a 2-track EP. The song was also featured in the soundtrack of EA Sports FC 25.

== Music video ==
Its music video was released on the same day of the single's release, with it being split in two chapters; "Endiamantado" is the first chapter and the music session, while "Entre las de 20" is the second chapter and surprise track. In the second chapter, which features Argentinian actor Diego Cremonesi, it shows both artists riding horses, with Bizarrap getting shot by Cremonesi and Cano shooting back.

== Charts ==
Chart performance for "Entre las de 20"
Chart (2024)	Peak position
Global 200 (Billboard)	51
Mexico (Billboard)	3
US Hot Latin Songs (Billboard)	26
