= Residente: Bzrp Music Sessions, Vol. 49 =

Single by Bizarrap and Residente
- Language: Spanish
- Released: 2 March 2022
- Studio: Bzrp Studio (Argentina)
- Genre: Latin hip hop
- Length: 8:39
- Label: Dale Play
- Songwriter: René Pérez Joglar
- Producer: Bizarrap

Bizarrap singles chronology
"Tiago PZK: Bzrp Music Sessions, Vol. 48" (2021)	"Residente: Bzrp Music Sessions, Vol. 49" (2022)	"Paulo Londra: Bzrp Music Sessions, Vol. 23" (2022)

Residente singles chronology
"Flow HP" (2021)	"Residente: Bzrp Music Sessions, Vol. 49" (2022)	"This Is Not America" (2022)

Music video
- "Residente: Bzrp Music Sessions, Vol. 49" on YouTube

"Residente: Bzrp Music Sessions, Vol. 49" is a diss track produced by Argentine producer Bizarrap and written by Puerto Rican rapper Residente. It was released on 2 March 2022, through Dale Play, amidst the latter's feud with Colombian singer J Balvin.

Within the track's three extensive verses, Residente criticizes Balvin, without mentioning him, by calling him an industry plant and accuses him of racism. Its accompanying music video attained two million views within an hour of release, while the song peaked atop the Argentina Hot 100 and the top 10 in six other countries. Additionally, it received a Gold certification in Spain.

== Background and release ==
A feud between Residente and J Balvin began when the latter boycotted the Latin Grammy Awards, stating that the awards "don’t value [Latin musicians]", leading the former into sending a response to Balvin with a video calling him out. In the video, Residente compares Balvin's music to hot dogs, metaphorically stating that "everyone likes [hot dogs], but when people want to eat well they go to a restaurant, which are the ones that win the Michelin stars". About an hour after the video was posted, Balvin responded with an Instagram post which shows him standing near a hot dog stand, while promoting the remix version of "Sal y Perrea" with Sech and Daddy Yankee.

Months later, Residente released a video where he states that he had a song ready for release, which has lyrics directed to a specific person in the Latin urban genre, further explaining that someone heard about the track and received lawsuit threats because of it. Though it was speculated that the track was directed to Balvin, Residente added that it was not about him. After Bizarrap released his 48th music session with Argentine rapper Tiago PZK, he announced at the beginning of February 2022 that he would release his 49th music session with Residente. After the announcement, Residente also encouraged his fans to watch its accompanying music video once it was released, stating that donations would go to the mental health organizations Silence the Shame and Taller Salud for each view it received.

== Composition and music video ==
Running at a length of eight minutes and 39 seconds, it is Bizarrap's longest music session. The Latin hip hop song is compromised into three parts, while its accompanying music video is split in three chapters, "En Un Lugar de la Mancha" (In a Village in La Mancha, the opening line of Don Quixote), "Mis Armas Son las Letras" (My Weapons Are the Lyrics), and "El Caballero de los Espejos" (The Knight of Mirrors); it is a diss track directed to Colombian singer J Balvin. Its video attained over two million views within its first hour.

Commencing the track, and the first chapter in the music video, Residente states that he feels unsettled as he watches over the Latin urban genre and compares himself to "a crocodile who creeps out of the Nile River." Residente describes Balvin's songs as hot dogs, relating them to junk food; it was previously said by the former where he metaphorically states that "everyone likes [hot dogs], but when people want to eat well they go to a restaurant, which are the ones that win the Michelin stars." Transitioning into the music video's second chapter, he continues by criticizing singers who only lip sync in live performances and the trend of adding a vast amount of songwriters for song of short duration. For the latter, Residente claims that Balvin barely contributed to any songwriting for his album Colores (2019), and that he only wrote "Amarillo". He also sees the Colombian singer as an industry plant, lyrically stating that although he is famous, he doesn't consider him a musical artist.

In the track's third part, Residente directly mentions Balvin; he criticizes the Colombian singer (whilst calling him a bobolon) for his appearances on the soundtrack for The SpongeBob Movie: Sponge on the Run and the compilation Pokémon 25: The Album, the release of the "Perra" music video which featured two black women in dog chains, and Balvin's controversial acceptance of the award for Best Afro-Latino Artist of the Year, while also referring him as the "Logan Paul of reggaeton". Throughout the chapter, he mentions other reggaeton artists who he thinks Balvin "erases from reggaeton history"; Myke Towers, Sech, ChocQuibTown, Rafa Pabön, Don Omar, Ozuna, Arcángel, and Tego Calderón are mentioned in order. Referring to Balvin's past multi-colored hair, he also says that the color brown is not seen and calls him a racist.

== Charts ==
Chart performance for "Residente: Bzrp Music Sessions, Vol. 49"
Chart (2022)	Peak position
Argentina Hot 100 (Billboard)	1
Bolivia (Billboard)	3
Chile (Billboard)	12
Colombia (Billboard)	6
Ecuador (Billboard)	4
Global 200 (Billboard)	20
Mexico (Billboard)	4
Peru (Billboard)	6
Spain (Promusicae)	3
US Hot Latin Songs (Billboard)	22

== Certifications ==
Certifications for "Residente: Bzrp Music Sessions, Vol. 49"
Region	Certification	Certified units/sales
Spain (Promusicae)	Gold	30,000^{‡}
^{‡} Sales+streaming figures based on certification alone.
