= Snow Tha Product: Bzrp Music Sessions, Vol. 39 =

2021 single by Bizarrap and Snow Tha Product

Single by Bizarrap and Snow Tha Product
- Released: April 28, 2021
- Recorded: 2021
- Studio: BZRP Studio, Ramos Mejía, Buenos Aires province, Argentina
- Genre: Rap
- Length: 2:57
- Label: Warner Music Latina; Dale Play Records
- Songwriter(s): Claudia Alexandra Madriz Meza: Gonzalo Julián Conde
- Producer(s): Bizarrap

Bizarrap singles chronology
"L-Gante: Bzrp Music Sessions, Vol. 38" (2021)	"Snow Tha Product: Bzrp Music Sessions, Vol. 39" (2021)	"Eladio Carrión: Bzrp Music Sessions, Vol. 40" (2021)

Snow Tha Product singles chronology
"Never Be Me" (2021)	"Snow Tha Product: Bzrp Music Sessions, Vol. 39" (2021)	"Get Money" (2021)

Music video
- "Snow Tha Product: Bzrp Music Sessions, Vol. 39" on YouTube

"Snow Tha Product: Bzrp Music Sessions, Vol. 39" is a song by Argentine record producer Bizarrap and American rapper Snow Tha Product. It was released on April 28, 2021, through Warner Music Latina and Dale Play Records. The music video for the song has more than 212 million views on YouTube. The song reached the top 20 of the Billboard Argentina Hot 100 chart. The song was nominated for the 22nd Annual Latin Grammy Awards for "Best Rap/Hip-Hop Song".

== Background and composition ==
The song was announced by producer Bizarrap through a preview shown on his Instagram. The song combines English and Spanish, which is traditional in Snow's songs. In the lyrics, Snow brags about being "on the throne", and takes shots at enemies and "wannabe rappers".She also references Mexican-American norteño group Los Tigres del Norte, and Mexican singer Beatriz Adriana.

== Personnel ==
Credits adapted from Genius.

- Snow Tha Product – vocals
- Bizarrap – producer, recording engineer
- Evlay – mixing
- Javier Fracchia – mastering
- GFX Yisus – artwork
- Salvi Díaz – videographer
- Agustín Sartori – video vfx

== Charts ==
Chart performance for "Snow Tha Product: Bzrp Music Sessions, Vol. 39"
Chart (2021)	Peak position
Argentina (Argentina Hot 100)	20
Global Excl. US (Billboard)	147
Spain (PROMUSICAE)	15
US Latin Digital Songs Sales (Billboard)	14

== Certifications ==
Certifications for "Snow Tha Product: Bzrp Music Sessions, Vol. 39"
Region	Certification	Certified units/sales
United States (RIAA)	Platinum (Latin)	60,000^{‡}
^{‡} Sales+streaming figures based on certification alone.
