= Playa Saturno =

Studio album by Rauw Alejandro
- Released: July 7, 2023
- Genre: Reggaeton
- Length: 45:54
- Language: Spanish
- Label: Sony Latin; Duars
- Producer: El Zorro; Julia Lewis; Mr. NaisGai; Dímelo Ninow; Kenobi; Bizarrap; Jorge Milliano; Cauty; Dulce Como Candy; DJ Luian; Mambo Kingz; Krizous; Jowny Boom Boom; Rvssian; Kenobi Sensei

Rauw Alejandro chronology
RR (2023)	Playa Saturno (2023)	Cosa Nuestra (2024)

Singles from Playa Saturno
- 1. "Baby Hello" Released: June 23, 2023; 2. "Si Te Pegas" Released: July 7, 2023; 3. "Diluvio" Released: November 7, 2023

Professional ratings
Review scores
Source	Rating
Pitchfork	6.5/10

Playa Saturno (English: Saturn Beach) is the fourth studio album by Puerto Rican singer Rauw Alejandro, released on July 7, 2023, by Sony Music Latin and Duars Entertainment. It was introduced as a spin-off, and released nearly 7 months after his third studio album Saturno (2022). Alejandro began working on the album during his Saturno World Tour, immersing himself from the studio into the cosmic world he created, resulting in this 14-track project. While taking on a different sonic approach from its prequel, the record covers a variety of topics from love and heartbreak, to having fun and partying.

Playa Saturno debuted at number 29 on the US Billboard 200, including number 3 on the Latin Rhythm Albums and number 4 on the Top Latin Albums chart with over 21,000 album-equivalent units.

== Background and release ==
Following the release of his third studio album Saturno and his 3-track EP RR with then fiancé Rosalía, Alejandro confirmed that his next album would likely be released in the summer of 2023.

On July 4, 2023, he announced the album's release date and revealed the cover art. With plans to rest following the release of this album, Alejandro told fans to enjoy for a while because he did not know when he'd plan to record another. On July 6, 2023, Alejandro revealed the tracklist with features from Ñejo & Dalmata, Junior H, Jowell & Randy, Ivy Queen, and Bizarrap.

== Singles ==
The first single of the album was "Baby Hello", a collaboration with Bizarrap released on June 23, 2023.

The second single "Si Te Pegas", is a collaboration with Spanish singer Miguel Bosé, which was released as a single alongside the album.

== Track listing ==
Playa Saturno track listing
No.	Title	Writer(s)	Producer(s)	Length
1.	"Playa Saturno Intro"	Raúl Alejandro Ocasio Ruiz; Aneurys Armando Sanchez	Julia Lewis; Mr. Naisgai; El Zorro; Dímelo Ninow; Kenobi; Jorge Milliano	1:15
2.	"Cuando Baje el Sol"	Raúl Alejandro Ocasio Ruiz; Aneurys Armando Sanchez; Christian Mojica Blanco	Mr. NaisGai; El Zorro; Dímelo Ninow; Kenobi; Jorge Milliano	2:46
3.	"Al Callao'"	Raúl Alejandro Ocasio Ruiz; Christian Mojica Blanco	El Zorro; Dímelo Ninow; Cauty; Kenobi; Dulce Como Candy	4:02
4.	"Cuki"	Raúl Alejandro Ocasio Ruiz; Christian Mojica Blanco; Joshua Omar Medina Cortés	El Zorro; Dímelo Ninow; Kenobi; Dulce Como Candy	2:45
5.	"No Me la Molestes" (with Ñejo & Dalmata)	Raúl Alejandro Ocasio Ruiz; Carlos Crespo Planas; Fernando Vázquez	El Zorro; Dímelo Ninow; Kenobi; Dulce Como Candy	3:41
6.	"Picardía" (with Junior H)	Raúl Alejandro Ocasio Ruiz; Antonio Herrera Pérez	El Zorro; DJ Luian; Mambo Kingz; Jowny Boom Boom; Dímelo Ninow; Kenobi; Krizous	3:35
7.	"Ponte Nasty" (with Jowell & Randy)	Raúl Alejandro Ocasio Ruiz; Joel Muñoz; Randy Ortiz	Mr. NaisGai; El Zorro; Dímelo Ninow; Kenobi; Julia Lewis	4:02
8.	"Inquieto"	Raúl Alejandro Ocasio Ruiz	Mr. Naisgai; El Zorro; Dímelo Ninow; Kenobi; Dulce Como Candy	3:42
9.	"Hoy Aqui"	Raúl Alejandro Ocasio Ruiz; Aneurys Armando Sanchez	Mr. NaisGai; El Zorro; Dímelo Ninow; Kenobi; Jorge Milliano	3:07
10.	"Celebrando" (featuring Ivy Queen)	Raúl Alejandro Ocasio Ruiz; Martha Pesante Rodríguez	El Zorro; Dímelo Ninow; Kenobi; Dulce Como Candy	3:27
11.	"No Me Soprende"	Raúl Alejandro Ocasio Ruiz; Christian Mojica Blanco	El Zorro; Rvssian; Dímelo Ninow; Kenobi	3:30
12.	"Diluvio"	Raúl Alejandro Ocasio Ruiz; Christian Mojica Blanco	El Zorro; Cauty; Dímelo Ninow; Kenobi	3:17
13.	"Si Te Pegas" (with Miguel Bosé)	Miguel Dominguín Bosé; Raúl Alejandro Ocasio Ruiz; Christian Mojica Blanco	El Zorro; Dímelo Ninow; Kenobi	3:03
14.	"Baby Hello" (with Bizarrap)	Raúl Alejandro Ocasio Ruiz; Christian Daniel Mojica; Gonzalo Julián Conde; Jorge Cedeño; Jorge Pizarro Ruiz; Nino Karlo Segarra	Bizarrap; El Zorro; Kenobi Sensei; Cauty; Dímelo Ninow; Dulce Como Candy	3:42
Total length:				45:54

== Charts ==
=== Weekly charts ===
Weekly chart performance for Playa Saturno
Chart (2023)	Peak position
Spanish Albums (PROMUSICAE)	4
US Billboard 200	29
US Latin Rhythm Albums (Billboard)	3
US Top Latin Albums (Billboard)	4

=== Year-end charts ===
Year-end chart performance for Playa Saturno
Chart (2023)	Position
Spanish Albums (PROMUSICAE)	49

== Certifications ==
Certifications for Playa Saturno
Region	Certification	Certified units/sales
Mexico (AMPROFON)	Platinum	140,000^{‡}
Spain (PROMUSICAE)	Gold	20,000^{‡}
United States (RIAA)	2× Platinum (Latin)	120,000^{‡}
^{‡} Sales+streaming figures based on certification alone.
