= Si Te Pegas =

Single by Rauw Alejandro and Miguel Bosé

from the album Playa Saturno
- Language: Spanish
- English title: "If You Stick"
- Released: July 7, 2023
- Genre: Reggaeton
- Length: 3:04
- Label: Sony Music Latin • Duars Entertainment
- Producer: El Zorro • Dímelo Ninow • Kenobi • Dulce Como Candy

Rauw Alejandro singles chronology
"Baby Hello" (2023)	"Si Te Pegas" (2023)	"Diluvio" (2023)

Miguel Bosé singles chronology
"Nada Particular" (2021)	"Si Te Pegas" (2023)

Music video
- "Si Te Pegas" on YouTube

Visualizer
- "Si Te Pegas" on YouTube

"Si Te Pegas" (English: "If You Stick") is a song by Puerto Rican singer Rauw Alejandro and Spanish singer Miguel Bosé, released as the second single from the former's fourth studio album, Playa Saturno (2023). A few hours after the album was released, the single was released the same day the album came out, July 7, 2023 through Sony Music Latin and Duars Entertainment.

== Background ==
Miguel Bosé had voice problems for several years. Later, in an interview, he announced that the problem was one of his teeth. When he got a wrong implant, over time it had turned into an infection that infected his entire face and went down to his intestines. They removed his tooth and his voice returned, after several years.

At the beginning of July 2023, Rauw Alejandro announced his fourth studio album "Playa Saturno" with collaborations with several singers, and among them, "Si Te Pegas" it was included as the thirteenth (penultimate) track on the album, a collaboration with Miguel Bosé.

== Promotion ==
=== Audio visualizer ===
An audio visualizer video for the song was released on July 7, 2023 along with other audio visualizer videos that premiered simultaneously with the release of the "Playa Saturno" album.

=== Music video ===
The music video premiered hours after the album was released, on July 7, 2023 on Rauw Alejandro's official YouTube's channel. At the beginning, Alejandro is seen singing in a luxurious place. Throughout the video, Alejandro and Miguel are seen in a car with other people driving by, while Bosé sings and the others dance. Finally, Alejandro, Miguel and everyone are seen dancing and perreando in a luxurious room.
