= Néstor en Bloque =

Argentine cumbia villera singer (born 1984)

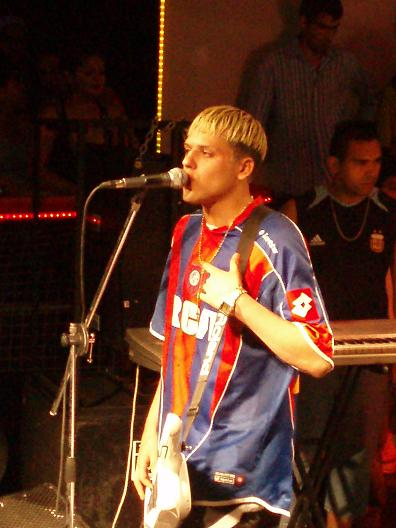
Néstor en Bloque in spring 2006

Néstor Bordiola (born 26 November 1984), better known by his stage name Néstor en Bloque, is an Argentine cumbia villera singer. He rose to fame with the release of his debut album Mi Único Amor (2005), featuring the hit single "Una calle nos separa". Following a two-year hiatus, he began performing again in 2019. Until 2023, he was based in Greater Buenos Aires, but since has resided in Miami, Florida.

== Biography ==
On 26 November 1984, Bordiola was born in Buenos Aires. His family then sequentially moved to Lanús and Canning. At the age of seven, he developed a deeper connection to music.

When 17-years-old, he began his music career as a keyboardist for Grupo Red. In 2002, he became a singer for La Base Musical. He worked with the group for three years until his manager suggested the formation of another for his solo career. Bordiola himself also wanted to produce more romantic music, deviating from established cumbia villera groups. For example, Pablo Lescano of Damas Gratis stated in 2006 he did not listen to Néstor en Bloque or El Polaco, which Página 12 attributed to his preference for "raw [sound]" over "love letters". In a 2024 interview with Sebastián Wainraich, Bordiola recalled the name "en Bloque" was inspired by the hope for a group that was "homogen[ous], all united, [and] pulling in the same direction". The same year, he released his debut album Mi Único Amor, in which the single "Una calle nos separa" became a hit. The album was nominated for best male tropical album at the 8th Annual Premios Gardel. By August 2007, he lived in Monte Grande with his wife Vanesa and 3-year-old daughter. That year, he had performed at the Teatro Gran Rex and in the United States, Spain, and Mexico.

In 2015, he briefly suffered from tachycardia related to work stress. In 2017, he began suffering from panic attacks and following an uncompleted show in Palermo due to them, he went on a two-year hiatus, during which he rarely left the house. In 2019, he began performing again, including his new album En el Gran Rex (En Vivo) (2018), which won best male tropical album at the 21st Annual Premios Gardel. In 2023, he moved to Miami, Florida, citing concerns for his family's safety after his wife experienced an armed robbery.

== Discography ==
- Mi Único Amor (2005)
- Rompiendo el Silencio (2006)
- Por Siempre Agredecido (2008)
- Inalcanzable (2009)
- 5ta Edición Combination (2011)
- En el Gran Rex (En Vivo) (2018)
