= Lismar: Bzrp Music Sessions, Vol. 60 =

Single by Bizarrap and Lismar
- Language: Spanish
- B-side: "Subió La Temperatura"
- Released: May 22, 2024
- Length: 2:52
- Label: Dale Play Records
- Songwriters: Gonzalo Julián Conde; Patricia Lismary Fernández Soto; Santiago Álvarado
- Producer: Bizarrap

Bizarrap singles chronology
"Natanael Cano: Bzrp Music Sessions, Vol. 59" (2024)	"Lismar: Bzrp Music Sessions, Vol. 60" (2024)	"Luck Ra: Bzrp Music Sessions, Vol. 61" (2024)

Lismar singles chronology
"4tg Funk" (2024)	"Lismar: Bzrp Music Sessions, Vol. 60" (2024)	"Subió La Temperatura" (2024)

Music video
- "Lismar: Bzrp Music Sessions, Vol. 60" on YouTube

"Lismar: Bzrp Music Sessions, Vol. 60" (Note: Alternatively known as "Yo Soy La Moda".) is a song by Argentine produce Bizarrap and Dominican rapper Lismar. It was released on May 22, 2024, through Dale Play Records.

== Background and release ==
On May 18, 2024, Bizarrap published a video on YouTube and its other networks criticizing the use of artificial intelligence. In it, Bizarrap is seen in an office and a worker who was apparently recently fired and leaving the place with a box. The man claims that he wants to show Bizarrap something and that he has been designing for a long time, and that he already recognizes who the next "60" session would be with. When she moves one of her Latin Grammy awards on her shelf, a secret door opens that leads to a room with screens, cables and virtual reality glasses, and there, the man shows her what he has done with the use of artificial intelligence sessions of Bizarrap with artists like Taylor Swift, Justin Bieber and Dua Lipa, and Bizarrap votes to hear Dua Lipa's and then he is surprised and wonders who made the beat and the man tells him that everything was done with artificial intelligence, which angers Bizarrap and causes a fight between the two, and then the place ends up burning and Bizarrap manages to escape. At the end of the video, Bizarrap puts on his broken glasses and in them he sees the Dominican rapper Lismar appear and perform a fragment of the song, where he confirms the release date of session 60 and the artist Lismar participating in it, scheduled for on May 22. Simultaneously, that same day the other collaboration between the two was also published, titled "Subió La Temperatura".
