= Rauw Alejandro: Bzrp Music Sessions, Vol. 56 =

Single by Bizarrap and Rauw Alejandro
- Language: Spanish
- Released: June 21, 2023
- Recorded: 2023
- Studio: BZRP Studio (Argentina)
- Genre: Latin house; dance-pop
- Length: 3:11
- Label: Dale Play
- Producer: Bizarrap

Bizarrap singles chronology
"Peso Pluma: Bzrp Music Sessions, Vol. 55" (2023)	"Rauw Alejandro: Bzrp Music Sessions, Vol. 56" (2023)	"Baby Hello" (2023)

Rauw Alejandro singles chronology
"Beso" (2023)	"Rauw Alejandro: Bzrp Music Sessions, Vol. 56" (2023)	"Baby Hello" (2023)

Music video
- "Rauw Alejandro: Bzrp Music Sessions, Vol. 56" on YouTube

"Rauw Alejandro: Bzrp Music Sessions, Vol. 56" is a song by the Argentine producer Bizarrap and Puerto Rican singer Rauw Alejandro, belonging to the Bzrp Music Sessions. It was released on June 21, 2023, through Dale Play Records.

== Background and release ==
Three weeks after the release of his previous "Bzrp Music Sessions #55" with Peso Pluma, Bizarrap announced "Bzrp Music Sessions #56" with Rauw Alejandro in a video on his Instagram account, for release the following day, June 21, 2023. In the video, several young people are shown in a clothing store where they are invited to a "special fitting room", which also turns out to be a booth to listen to the song. The track samples Shakira's wailing breaths from her 2009 single "She Wolf". The song was officially released on June 21, 2023.

== Music video ==
The official music video was released alongside the single on June 21, 2023, which begins showing Alejandro wearing a helmet and a thick sweater.

During the video, Alejandro can be seen performing the song with headphones on while behind him, Bizarrap is seated while also wearing headphones and a blue sweater, producing the song at a computer. Afterwards, Alejandro is shown wearing the helmet again.

At the end of the video it is announced that another collaboration between Bizarrap and Alejandro titled "Baby Hello" would be released on June 23, 2023.

== Charts ==
=== Weekly charts ===
Chart performance for "Rauw Alejandro: Bzrp Music Sessions, Vol. 56"
Chart (2023)	Peak position
Argentina Hot 100 (Billboard)	12
Argentina (Monitor Latino)	19
Bolivia (Billboard)	15
Chile (Billboard)	23
Chile (Monitor Latino)	10
Dominican Republic (SODINPRO)	21
Ecuador (Billboard)	20
El Salvador (Monitor Latino)	9
Global 200 (Billboard)	32
Honduras (Monitor Latino)	3
Panama (Monitor Latino)	13
Paraguay (Monitor Latino)	12
Peru (Billboard)	12
Portugal (AFP)	192
Spain (PROMUSICAE)	1
Uruguay (Monitor Latino)	12
US Hot Dance/Electronic Songs (Billboard)	5
US Hot Latin Songs (Billboard)	36
US Latin Pop Airplay (Billboard)	13

=== Monthly charts ===
Monthly chart performance for "Rauw Alejandro: Bzrp Music Sessions, Vol. 56"
Chart (2023)	Peak position
Paraguay (SGP)	11
Uruguay (CUD)	18

=== Year-end charts ===
2023 year-end chart performance for "Rauw Alejandro: Bzrp Music Sessions, Vol. 56"
Chart (2023)	Position
US Hot Dance/Electronic Songs (Billboard)	37

== Certifications ==
Certifications for "Rauw Alejandro: Bzrp Music Sessions, Vol. 56"
Region	Certification	Certified units/sales
Mexico (AMPROFON)	Platinum	140,000^{‡}
Spain (PROMUSICAE)	3× Platinum	180,000^{‡}
^{‡} Sales+streaming figures based on certification alone.
