= Luck Ra: Bzrp Music Sessions, Vol. 61 =

Single by Bizarrap and Luck Ra
- Language: Spanish
- Released: December 27, 2024
- Studio: BZRP Studio (Argentina)
- Genre: Cuarteto
- Length: 2:51
- Label: Dale Play Records
- Songwriters: Gonzalo Julián Conde; Juan Facundo Almenara Ordóñez; Renzo Luca; Santiago Álvarado; Paulo Ezequiel Dybala
- Producer: Bizarrap

Bizarrap singles chronology
"Lismar: Bzrp Music Sessions, Vol. 60" (2024)	"Luck Ra: Bzrp Music Sessions, Vol. 61" (2024)	"Daddy Yankee: Bzrp Music Sessions, Vol. 0/66" (2025)

Luck Ra singles chronology
"Suavemente" (2024)	"Luck Ra: Bzrp Music Sessions, Vol. 61" (2024)	"A 200 Remix" (2025)

Music video
- "Luck Ra: Bzrp Music Sessions, Vol. 61" on YouTube

"Luck Ra: Bzrp Music Sessions, Vol. 61" is a song by Argentine producer Bizarrap and compatriot singer Luck Ra. It was released on December 27, 2024, through Dale Play Records.

== Background and release ==
Following the release of his 60th session and the song "Subió la Temperatura" with Dominican rapper Lismar, several months began to pass without the producer releasing new music. Some people began to speculate that perhaps this was the end of the BZRP Music Sessions, while others believed that the producer was preparing something much better.

On December 26, 2024, the producer revealed a hint from his upcoming 61st session by dropping a preview of the song, where Luck Ra can be heard singing, increasing speculation that the session will be with him. Hours later, Bizarrap confirmed that the session would be with Luck Ra and it was released the following day.

== Music video ==
The music video was released simultaneously with the single on December 27, 2024.

== Charts ==
=== Weekly charts ===
Weekly chart performance for "Bzrp Music Sessions, Vol. 61"
Chart (2025)	Peak position
Argentina (Argentina Hot 100)	2
Argentina (CAPIF)	2
Argentina Airplay (Monitor Latino)	3
Argentina National Songs (Monitor Latino)	2
Bolivia (Monitor Latino)	1
Chile (Monitor Latino)	4
Paraguay (Monitor Latino)	1
Spain (PROMUSICAE)	25
Uruguay (Monitor Latino)	1

=== Monthly charts ===
Monthly chart performance
Chart (2025)	Peak position
Parauguay (SGP)	5

=== Year-end charts ===
Year-end chart performance
Chart (2025)	Position
Argentina Airplay (Monitor Latino)	5
Bolivia Airplay (Monitor Latino)	9
