= Tan Biónica =

Argentine pop rock band

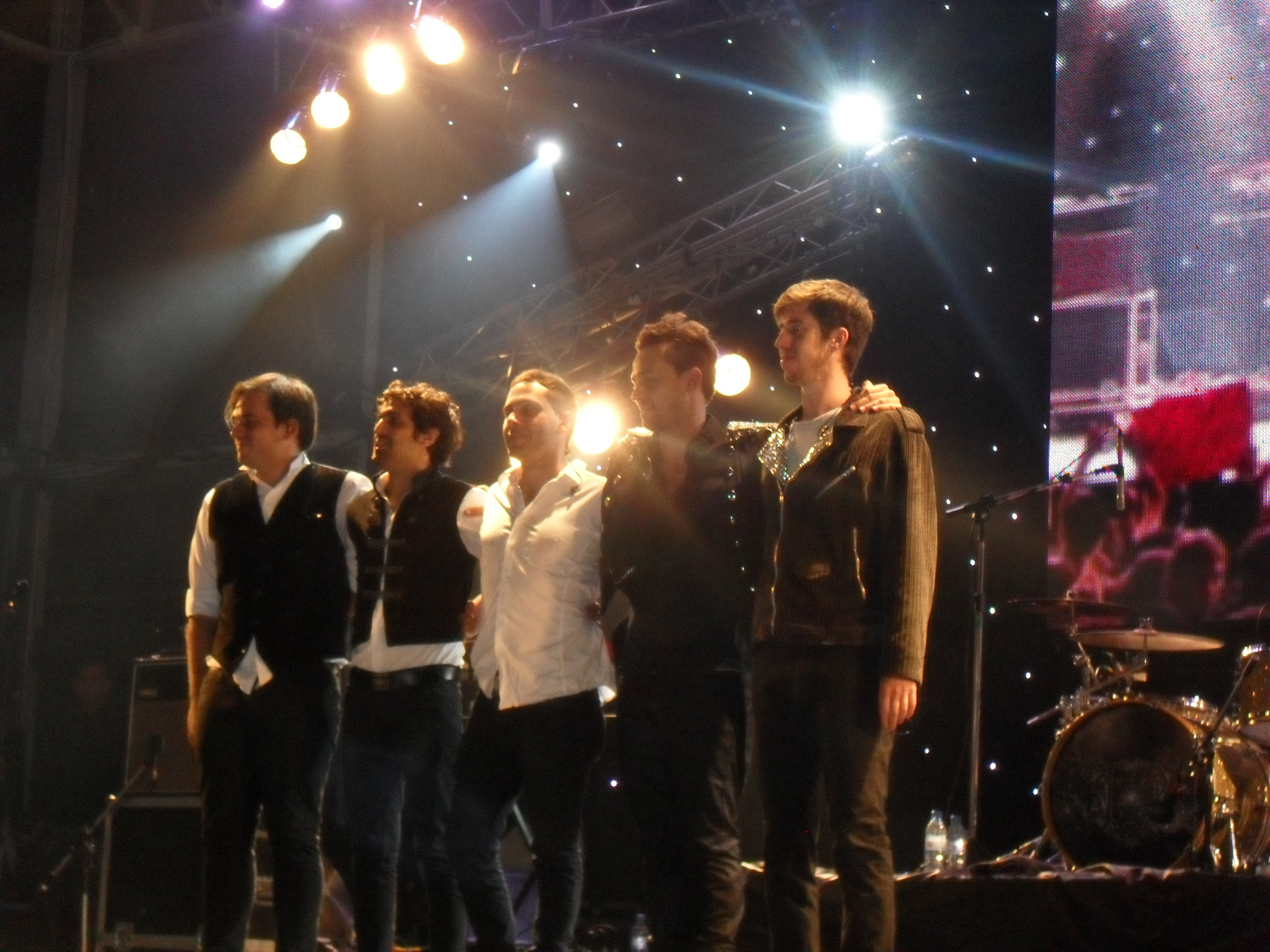
- Tan Biónica in 2012

Background information
- Origin: Buenos Aires, Argentina
- Genres: Pop, electropop, Electronic rock
- Years active: 2002–2016, 2023–present
- Labels: Pirca Records; EMI; Virgin Records; Universal Music
- Past members: Santiago Moreno Charpentier; Gonzalo Moreno Charpentier; Diego Lichtenstein; Sebastián Seoane
- Website: www.tanbionica.com

Tan Biónica is a pop rock band from Argentina. The group was formed in 2002 in Buenos Aires by vocalist Santiago "Chano" Moreno Charpentier, his younger brother Gonzalo "Bambi" Moreno Charpentier, Sebastián Seoane (guitar), and Diego Lichtenstein (drums). Tan Biónica worked on the soundtracks for the telenovelas Graduados and Viudas e hijos del Rock and Roll.

Tan Biónica enjoyed significant radio airplay and fame after the release of their second studio album, Obsesionario, in 2010. Their next album, Destinología in 2013, contained the single Ciudad Mágica, which reached the Number 1 spot on the Argentina Top 20 chart. Destinología also featured the band's second Number 1 hit single, La Melodía de Dios. The band broke up in 2016 but their lead vocalist Chano announced on 17 March 2023 that all the original members would be returning for a second term.

== Members ==
- Bambi Moreno Charpentier: bass and synth
- Chano Moreno Charpentier: singer
- Diego Lichtenstein: drums
- Sebastián Seoane: guitars

== Awards ==
- 2013: Winner of "Best Latin Song" during the Kids Choice Awards Argentina awards
- 2013: Winner of "Best Argentine artist" during E! Awards
- 2014: Winner of "Best Album - Pop Groups" during Premios Gardel awards
- 2012: Nominee of "Best South Latin American Act" during MTV EMA
- 2013: Nominee of "Best South Latin American Act" during MTV EMA
- 2014: Nominee of "Best South Latin American Act" during MTV EMA
- 2015: Nominee of "Best South Latin American Act" during MTV EMA
- 2025 – Winner: Best Live Album for *La Última Noche Mágica en Vivo – Estadio River Plate* (Premios Gardel)
- 2025 – Winner: Best Pop Rock Song for “Arruinarse” (collaboration with Airbag) (Premios Gardel)

== Discography ==
=== Albums ===
- 2001: Tapa de Moda (demo)
- 2007: Canciones del Huracán
- 2010: Obsesionario
- 2013: Destinología
- 2015: Hola Mundo
- 2025: El regreso

Special releases

- 2014: Obsesionario (Black edition)
- 2014: Destinologia (Black Edition)

Live albums

- 2014: Vivo Usina del Arte

Remix albums

- 2015: Hola Mi Vida (The Remixes)
- 2016: Buenas Noches Otra Vez (The Remixes)

=== EP ===
- 2003: Wonderful Noches

=== Singles ===
| Year | Song | Máxima position | Album |
| Year | Song | ARG | Album |
|---|---|---|---|
| 2007 | "Veneno" | — | Wonderful Noches |
| 2007 | "Wonderful Noches" | — | Wonderful Noches |
| 2007 | "Arruinarse" | — | Canciones del Huracán |
| 2008 | "Chica Biónica" | — | Canciones del Huracán |
| 2009 | "Lunita de Tucumán" | — | Canciones del Huracán |
| 2010 | "Ella" | — | Obsesionario |
| 2011 | "Beautiful" | 5 | Obsesionario |
| 2011 | "El Duelo" | — | Obsesionario |
| 2011 | "Obsesionario en La Mayor" | — | Obsesionario |
| 2011 | "Loca" | — | Obsesionario |
| 2012 | "La Comunidad" | 3 | Obsesionario |
| 2012 | "La Suerte Está Echada" | — | Obsesionario |
| 2012 | "Pétalos" | — | Obsesionario |
| 2012 | "Ciudad Mágica" | 1 | Destinología |
| 2013 | "La Melodía de Dios" | 1 | Destinología |
| 2013 | "Música" | 5 | Destinología |
| 2014 | "Vámonos" | 6 | Destinología |
| 2014 | "Mis Noches de Enero" | 13 | Destinología |
| 2014 | "Hola Mi Vida" | 8 | Hola Mundo |
| 2015 | "Las Cosas Que Pasan" | 11 | Hola Mundo |
| 2015 | "Un Poco Perdido" | 13 | Hola Mundo |
| 2016 | "Buenas Noches Otra Vez" | — | |
