= Baby Hello =

Single by Rauw Alejandro and Bizarrap

from the album Playa Saturno
- Language: Spanish
- Released: June 23, 2023
- Recorded: 2023
- Genre: Electropop • Latin house • EDM
- Length: 3:42
- Label: Duars Entertainment; Sony Music Latin
- Composers: Christian Daniel Mojica; Gonzalo Julián Conde; Jorge Cedeño; Jorge Pizarro Ruiz; Nino Karlo Segarra; Raúl Alejandro Ocasio Ruiz
- Producers: Bizarrap; El Zorro; Kenobi Sensei; Cauty; Dímelo Ninow; Dulce Como Candy

Rauw Alejandro singles chronology
"Rauw Alejandro: Bzrp Music Sessions, Vol. 56" (2023)	"Baby Hello" (2023)	"Si Te Pegas" (2023)

Bizarrap singles chronology
"Rauw Alejandro: Bzrp Music Sessions, Vol. 56" (2023)	"Baby Hello" (2023)	"Remember Me" (2023)

Music video
- "Baby Hello" on YouTube

"Baby Hello" is a song by Puerto Rican singer Rauw Alejandro and Argentine producer Bizarrap. It was released on June 23, 2023 through Duars Entertainment and Sony Music Latin as the first single from Alejandro's fourth studio album, Playa Saturno.

== Background ==
After Rauw Alejandro released "Bzrp Music Sessions #56" with Bizarrap, at the end of the video for that song it was shown that their second collaboration, "Baby Hello", would be released on June 23, 2023.

== Music video ==
The music video was published simultaneously with the song at dawn on June 23, 2023, on Rauw Alejandro's YouTube channel. The visual piece is set in a kind of beach on the lunar surface and shows the union of earthlings and aliens in the midst of emotion and euphoria, which reflects the energy of the song. It was directed by Martín Seipel and Rauw Alejandro "el Zorro" and recorded in the city of Miami.

== Critical reception ==
Various outlets highlight the mix of electronic and urban rhythms in the song, which "manages to transport us to the origin of EDM music and the legendary 'raves' of the 90s sic", in addition to calling it the "perfect counterpart" from "Bzrp Music Sessions, Vol. 56".

The Spanish newspaper El Mundo described it as "another attempt to have one of the hits of the summer in 2023" and, similarly, Cinthya Castaño of the Colombian television channel Red+ claimed that "it promises to become a hit for this semester of 2023".

== Charts ==
=== Weekly charts ===
Weekly chart performance for "Baby Hello"
Chart (2023)	Peak position
Argentina Hot 100 (Billboard)	10
Argentina (Monitor Latino)	4
Central America (Monitor Latino)	15
Chile (Monitor Latino)	6
Colombia (Monitor Latino)	11
Colombia (National-Report)	11
Dominican Republic (SODINPRO)	38
El Salvador (Monitor Latino)	17
Global 200 (Billboard)	99
Honduras (Monitor Latino)	9
Latin America (Monitor Latino)	11
Mexico (National-Report)	3
Panama (Monitor Latino)	12
Paraguay (Monitor Latino)	7
Uruguay (Monitor Latino)	5
Spain (PROMUSICAE)	2
US Hot Dance/Electronic Songs (Billboard)	4
US Hot Latin Songs (Billboard)	32
US Latin Rhythm Airplay (Billboard)	17
Venezuela (National-Report)	14

=== Monthly charts ===
Monthly chart performance for "Baby Hello"
Chart (2023)	Peak position
Paraguay (SPG)	11

=== Year-end charts ===
Year-end chart performance for "Baby Hello"
Chart (2023)	Position
US Hot Dance/Electronic Songs (Billboard)	24

== Certifications ==
Certifications for "Baby Hello"
Region	Certification	Certified units/sales
Italy (FIMI)	Gold	50,000^{‡}
Mexico (AMPROFON)	Platinum+Gold	210,000^{‡}
Spain (PROMUSICAE)	6× Platinum	600,000^{‡}
United States (RIAA)	3× Platinum (Latin)	180,000^{‡}
^{‡} Sales+streaming figures based on certification alone.
