= Gabriela Radice =

Argentine journalist

Gabriela Radice (born 1968) is an Argentine journalist.

== Awards ==
=== Nominations ===
- 2013 Martín Fierro Awards
  - Best female journalist
