= Young Miko: Bzrp Music Sessions, Vol. 58 =

Single by Bizarrap and Young Miko
- Language: Spanish
- Released: January 10, 2024
- Genre: Reggaeton; trap; R&B
- Length: 3:07
- Label: Dale Play
- Songwriters: Gonzalo Julián Conde; María Victoria Ramírez; Santiago Álvarado; Diego Amaury López; Joan Manuel Ubiñas; Dominik Eulberg
- Producer: Bizarrap

Bizarrap singles chronology
"Milo J: Bzrp Music Sessions, Vol. 57" (2023)	"Young Miko: Bzrp Music Sessions, Vol. 58" (2024)	"Natanael Cano: Bzrp Music Sessions, Vol. 59" / "Entre las de 20" (2024)

Young Miko singles chronology
"Señorita" (2023)	"Young Miko: Bzrp Music Sessions, Vol. 58" (2024)	"En Esta Boca" (2024)

Music video
- "Young Miko: Bzrp Music Sessions, Vol. 58" on YouTube

"Young Miko: Bzrp Music Sessions, Vol. 58" is a song by Argentine producer Bizarrap and Puerto Rican rapper and singer Young Miko. It was released on January 10, 2024, through Dale Play Records, as part of their Bzrp Music Sessions series.

== Background and release ==
Rumors of a possible collaboration between Young Miko and Bizarrap began when in some comments on music videos of Young Miko's songs people wrote that a session with the Puerto Rican singer could be a success, and that Bizarrap would add her to part of their Bzrp Music Sessions series. In December 2023, it was speculated that Colombian singer-songwriter Feid could be the participant in Bzrp Music Sessions #58. Young Miko was later confirmed to be the performer for Bzrp Music Sessions #58, when Bizarrap announced on their Instagram their collaboration with the singer on January 8, 2024, and scheduled for release on January 10.

== Composition ==
The song combines reggaeton, trap, certain touches of R&B and use of synthesizers.

== Music video ==
The music video was released simultaneously with the single on January 10, 2024. In the video, Young Miko is seen with headphones wearing a long-sleeved shirt with the slogan "Safe sex forever", an old-school tattoo, and a black beanie. Meanwhile, Bizarrap can be seen behind Miko dressed in a dark blue Adidas sweater along with a patrol mark and also with headphones on a table where he has his computer.

== Charts ==
=== Weekly charts ===
Chart performance for "Young Miko: Bzrp Music Sessions, Vol. 58"
Chart (2024)	Peak position
Argentina (Argentina Hot 100)	3
Argentina Airplay (Monitor Latino)	15
Bolivia (Billboard)	6
Central America (Monitor Latino)	9
Chile (Billboard)	7
Colombia (Billboard)	12
Costa Rica (FONOTICA)	1
Costa Rica (Monitor Latino)	11
Ecuador (Billboard)	7
Ecuador (Monitor Latino)	15
El Salvador (Monitor Latino)	5
Global 200 (Billboard)	14
Honduras (Monitor Latino)	7
Latin America (Monitor Latino)	2
Mexico (Billboard)	22
Nicaragua (Monitor Latino)	17
Panama (Monitor Latino)	8
Panama (PRODUCE)	7
Paraguay (Monitor Latino)	15
Peru (Billboard)	4
Puerto Rico (Monitor Latino)	5
Spain (PROMUSICAE)	1
Uruguay (Monitor Latino)	10
US Bubbling Under Hot 100 (Billboard)	9
US Hot Latin Songs (Billboard)	20
US Latin Rhythm Airplay (Billboard)	22
Venezuela (Monitor Latino)	18

=== Monthly charts ===
Chart (2024)	Peak position
Paraguay (SGP)	35
Uruguay (CUD)	15

== Certifications ==
Certifications for "Young Miko: Bzrp Music Sessions, Vol. 58"
Region	Certification	Certified units/sales
Spain (Promusicae)	Platinum	60,000^{‡}
^{‡} Sales+streaming figures based on certification alone.
