= L-Gante =

Argentine singer and songwriter (born 2000)

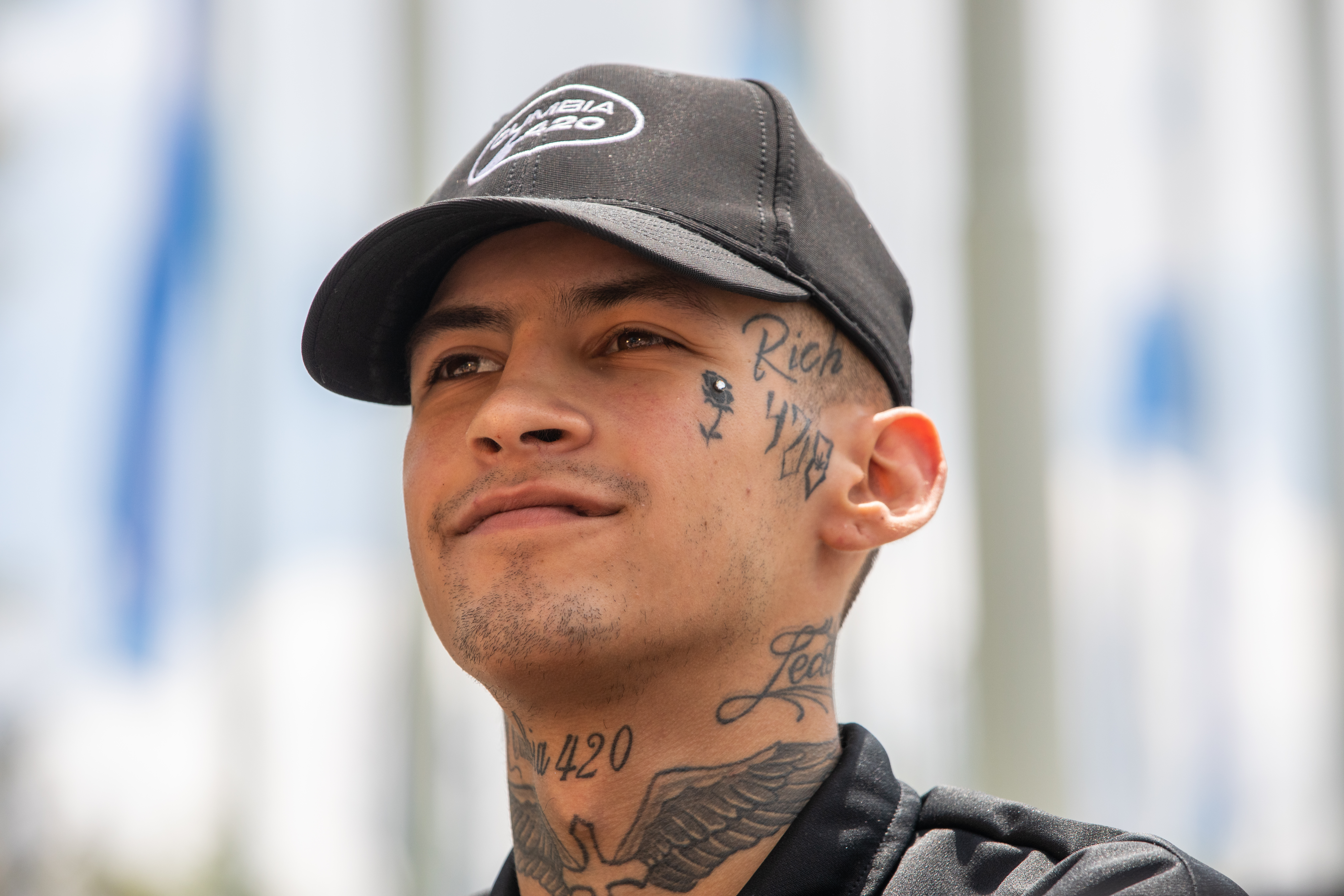
- L-Gante in 2022

Background information
- Born: Elian Ángel Valenzuela; 5 April 2000 (age 25); General Rodríguez, Buenos Aires Province, Argentina
- Genres: Cumbia
- Occupations: Rapper; singer; songwriter
- Years active: 2017–present
- Labels: Kriterio Music

Elian Ángel Valenzuela (born 5 April 2000), better known as L-Gante, is an Argentine rapper, singer, and songwriter.

He rose to fame in 2021 following the release of his collaboration with Papu DJ, "L-Gante Rkt", and later gained mainstream popularity with the release of "Bzrp Music Sessions, Vol. 38", in collaboration with producer Bizarrap, which topped the Argentine Billboard Hot 100 chart.

== Background ==
Valenzuela was born on 5 April 2000 in General Rodríguez, in the Greater Buenos Aires metropolitan area. He was raised by a single mother; he doesn't have any relationship with his father. He began to produce music at 15. His first songs were co-produced with close collaborator DT. Bilardo.

Before reaching success, Valenzuela worked at a plastic factory.

== Musical career ==
=== Beginnings ===
Valenzuela's first release was uploaded to YouTube in 2017, but he wouldn't find much success until the following year, when his single "Uno más uno" attained over 2 million streams on Spotify. In December 2020, his collaboration with producer Papu DJ, "L-Gante RKT", debuted at 52 in the Argentine Billboard Hot 100, and peaked at second place in January 2021. The song is a mix of Argentine cumbia and reggaeton, and its lyrics detail clandestine parties in working-class barrios in times of COVID-19 restrictions.

In November 2020, he released "Pistola" alongside El Más Ladrón, produced by DT. Bilardo.

=== BZRP Music Session and widespread success ===
In early March 2021, producer Bizarrap announced L-Gante would be the next featured artist in his Music Sessions series. The release of the session was scheduled for 9 March, but in the early hours of that day, Valenzuela was detained in Rawson, San Juan Province under charges of causing public disturbances, and the release was delayed until Valenzuela could be cleared and released from custody. "L-Gante: Bzrp Music Sessions, Vol. 38" was released on Bizarrap's YouTube channel the following day, garnering over 3 million views in under 24 hours and trending at number 2. The collaboration topped the Billboard Hot 100, and remained at number 1 for seven consecutive weeks. On 30 March, L-Gante and La Joaqui released the single "Lassie".

In April 2021, Valenzuela released a remix of "Pistola" featuring cumbia band Damas Gratis. In May, he released two further singles: "Visionario" and "Internacional Love 420", featuring reggae singer Fidel Nadal. The same month, L-Gante was named "Artist of the Month" by Billboard Argentina, starring in the cover of the magazine's digital and physical editions.

In 2021, he collaborated with Dillom in his single "Tinty Nasty", and later featured in Dillom's debut album, Post Mortem.

== Style and influences ==
Valenzuela has stated that he considers himself primarily a cumbia artist, with his particular style and brand being "Cumbia 420"; a mixture of cumbia and reggaeton, with marihuana playing a prominent role in the music's lyrics and themes. According to Valenzuela himself, his early incursions in music were motivated by his desire to make music in a style that was "more [Argentine]" and less influenced by foreign genres and trends. His music is also influenced by Latin trap.

== Personal life ==
In 2022, Valenzuela became engaged to his girlfriend, Tamara Báez. In 2021, Valenzuela and Báez had a daughter, whom they named Jamaica.

From 2024 to 2025, Valenzuela was in a relationship with Wanda Nara.

== Discography ==
=== Singles ===
List of singles with selected chart positions
Year	Title	Peak chart positions		
Year	Title	ARG	SPA	US
2018	"Uno más uno"	—	—	—
2018	"Gucci" (featuring DT. Bilardo)	—	—	—
2018	"Uno más uno (Remix)" (featuring Seba TC and DT.Bilardo)	—	—	—
2018	"Pinto el calor" (featuring Luam)	—	—	—
2019	"Tik tok" (featuring El Amante and DT.Bilardo)	—	—	—
2019	"Choke choke" (featuring DT.Bilardo, Perro Primo and Seba TC)	—	—	—
2019	"Mary (Remix)" (featuring Zato DJ, Perro Primo, DT.Bilardo, Zurdo and Luchiboy)	—	—	—
2019	"Que lo wa (Remix)" (featuring Ray Menace)	—	—	—
2019	"Que choque el culo" (featuring Ale Oviedo)	—	—	—
2019	"Pal piso" (featuring DT.Bilardo)	—	—	—
2019	"Alerta alarma" (featuring DT.Bilardo, El Amante and Ale Oviedo)	—	—	—
2019	"Whisky cola" (featuring DT.Bilardo and Perro Primo)	—	—	—
2019	"Rich" (featuring Perro Primo and DT.Bilardo)	—	—	—
2020	"Aleteo 420" (featuring DT.Bilardo)	—	—	—
2020	"Pitbull terrier biry" (featuring Perro Primo and DT.Bilardo)	—	—	—
2020	"Tik tok (Remix)" (featuring DT.Bilardo, El Amante, Perro Primo and Nio García)	—	—	—
2020	"Aleteo 420 - Remix" (featuring DJ Barott)	—	—	—
2020	"L-Gante RKT" (featuring Papu DJ)	—	—	—
2020	"R.a.M" (featuring DT.Bilardo and Perro Primo)	—	—	—
2020	"Pistola" (featuring El Más Ladrón and DT.Bilardo)	—	—	—
2020	"Enrolo y quemo" (featuring El Más Berrako and DT.Bilardo)	—	—	—
2020	"Malianteo 420" (featuring DT.Bilardo)	—	—	—
2020	"Malianteo 420 - Remix" (featuring DJ Alex)	—	—	—
2020	"El barrio" (featuring Perro Primo, El Mas Berrako and DT.Bilardo)	—	—	—
2020	"Vino y pomelo" (featuring DT.Bilardo)	—	—	—
2020	"Pompa pa tra - Remix" (featuring Kaleb Di Masi, DT.Bilardo and Bruno LC)	—	—	—
2021	"Pandillero" (featuring Blunted Vato and DT.Bilardo)	—	—	—
2021	"Clandestina 420" (featuring DJ Alex and DT.Bilardo)	—	—	—
2021	"Dentro del Party" (featuring DT.Bilardo)	—	—	—
2021	"Pistola (Remix)" (featuring DJ Pirata, DT.Bilardo, El Kaio and Maxi Gen)	—	—	—
2021	"Titubeo" (featuring Homer El Mero Mero and DT.Bilardo)	—	—	—
2021	"Pasame el blunt" (featuring El Mas Ladrón and DT.Bilardo)	—	—	—
2021	"Chapa y carbón" (featuring DT.Bilardo and Malandro)	—	—	—
2021	"Combi nueva" (featuring Papichamp, Blunted Vato and Ecko)	96	—	—
2021	"#XDTRA" (featuring Roman El Original and Perro Primo)	—	—	—
2021	"Mi banda encendida" (featuring Frijo and DT.Bilardo)	—	—	—
2021	"Barra libre" (featuring DT.Bilardo and Gonzalo Nawel)	—	—	—
2021	"Detrás del hit" (featuring Franklin West and DT.Bilardo)	—	—	—
2021	"PPT (Patita pa tra)" (featuring Perro Primo and DT.Bilardo)	—	—	—
2021	"Tinty nasty" (featuring DT.Bilardo, Omar Varela and Dillom)	—	—	—
2021	"L-Gante: Bzrp Music Sessions, Vol. 38" (featuring Bizarrap)	1	43	—
2021	"Lassie" (featuring La Joaqui)	—	—	—
2021	"Pistola (Remix)" (featuring DT.Bilardo and El Más Ladrón)	2	—	—
2021	"Lassie (DJ Alex Remix)» (featuring DJ Alex and La Joaqui)	—	—	—
2021	"Visionario" (featuring DT.Bilardo)	56	—	—
2021	"Internacional Love 420" (featuring DT.Bilardo and Fidel Nadal)	—	—	—
2021	«Donde Están Los Guachos» (featuring DT.Bilardo and Me Dicen Fideo)	63	—	—
2021	«Remake» (featuring John C, Néstor en Bloque, Perro Primo and Papichamp)	44	—	—
2021	«Vivimos Como Capos» (featuring Homer El Mero Mero and Yubeili)	—	—	—
2021	«TU REO» (featuring DT.Bilardo)	42	—	—
2021	«Turrosmánticos» (featuring Frijo and DT.Bilardo)	97	—	—
2021	«Alta Data» (featuring DT.Bilardo and Eric Santana)	76	—	—
2021	«Por Tu Lengua (Remix)» (featuring Bulin 47, El Experimento, Kevvo, Ceky, Viciny, El Mayor Quimico and Ultramega)	—	—	—
2021	«LOGI» (featuring DT.Bilardo, Perro Primo and Homer El Mero Mero)	57	—	—
2021	«Cucurucho» (featuring Lérica)	—	—	—
2021	«Malianteo 420 (Volumen 2)» (featuring DT.Bilardo)	10	—	—
2021	«Las Guaguas Van» (featuring Miky Woodz, Alemán, Omy de Oro, Neutro Shorty, Chucky73, Nino Freestyle, Hozwal, Totoy El Frío and Pablo Chill-E)	—	—	—
2021	«C Piko La Clandestina» (featuring Damas Gratis and Marita)	—	—	—
2021	"Bar" (with Tini)	1	78	—
"—" denotes a record that did not chart or was not released in that country.

=== Studio albums ===
- Celda 4 (2024)
