= Nicky Jam: Bzrp Music Sessions, Vol. 41 =

2021 single by Bizarrap and Nicky Jam

Single by Bizarrap and Nicky Jam
- Released: June 30, 2021
- Recorded: 2021
- Studio: BZRP Studio, Ramos Mejía, Buenos Aires province, Argentina
- Length: 2:38
- Label: Dale Play
- Songwriters: Nick Rivera; Gonzalo Julián Conde; Reggi "El Auténtico"
- Producer: Bizarrap

Bizarrap singles chronology
| "Eladio Carrión: Bzrp Music Sessions, Vol. 40" (2021) | "Nicky Jam: Bzrp Music Sessions, Vol. 41" (2021) | "YaMeFui" (2021) |

Nicky Jam singles chronology
| "Poblado (Remix)" (2021) | "Nicky Jam: Bzrp Music Sessions, Vol. 41" (2021) | "Triste" (2021) |

Music video
- "Nicky Jam: Bzrp Music Sessions, Vol. 41" on YouTube

"Nicky Jam: Bzrp Music Sessions, Vol. 41" is a song by Argentine record producer Bizarrap and American singer and rapper Nicky Jam. It was released on June 30, 2021, through Dale Play Records, the music video was released on Bizarrap's YouTube channel. This is the second Bzrp Music Sessions to feature an artist of Puerto Rican descent and was released two weeks after "Eladio Carrión: Bzrp Music Sessions, Vol. 40" with Eladio Carrión, who was the first Puerto Rican artist to record with Bizarrap. This song is Music Sessions number 41. The song reached number 1 on the Billboard Argentina Hot 100 chart and has more than 30 million streams on Spotify within weeks of its release.

== Background ==
The Bzrp Music Sessions had been leaked three days before its release when Bizarrap was at the airport and a fan recorded a video behind his back showing Bizarrap seeing a photo of him and Nicky Jam letting it be known that the next Bzrp Music Sessions would be from said artist. On June 29, 2021, when the promotion of the last Bzrp Music Sessions with the Puerto Rican rapper Eladio Carrión had not finished, Bizarrap announced the Bzrp Music Sessions with Nicky Jam which was published the following day.

== Composition and lyric ==
The lyrics of the song were written by Nicky Jam and Reggi "El Auténtico", in the song it refers to the deceased former Argentine footballer Diego Maradona and to the 1986 FIFA World Cup in Mexico since in that tournament Maradona became champion with the Argentina national football team.

== Music video ==
The music video for the song was published on the same day as the single's release on Bizarrap's YouTube channel and reached number 1 in trends in several countries where Bizarrap had never reached like the United States. In just one day, the song reached 12 million views on YouTube and became the Latin song that got a million likes in less than 24 hours, a place occupied by the song "Yonaguni" by Bad Bunny. Currently the music video has more than 90 million views on YouTube.

== Personnel ==
Credits adapted from Tidal.

- Nicky Jam – vocals
- Bizarrap – producer
- Reggi "El Auténtico" – songwriter
- Evlay – mixing
- Javier Fracchia – mastering
- Salvi Díaz – videographer
- Agustín Sartori – video vfx

== Charts ==
Chart performance for "Nicky Jam: Bzrp Music Sessions, Vol. 41"
| Chart (2021) | Peak position |
|---|---|
| Argentina Hot 100 (Billboard) | 1 |
| Chile Airplay (Los 40) | 2 |
| Colombia (Promúsica) | 16 |
| Global 200 (Billboard) | 26 |
| Honduras (Monitor Latino) | 16 |
| Mexico Streaming (AMPROFON) | 9 |
| Paraguay (SGP) | 12 |
| Spain (PROMUSICAE) | 3 |
| Uruguay (Monitor Latino) | 10 |
| US Hot Latin Songs (Billboard) | 38 |

== Certifications ==
Certifications for "Nicky Jam: Bzrp Music Sessions, Vol. 41"
| Region | Certification | Certified units/sales |
|---|---|---|
| Mexico (AMPROFON) | Gold | 70,000^{‡} |
| Spain (Promusicae) | 2× Platinum | 80,000^{‡} |
^{‡} Sales+streaming figures based on certification alone.
