= L-Gante: Bzrp Music Sessions, Vol. 38 =

2021 single by Bizarrap and L-Gante

Single by Bizarrap and L-Gante
- Released: March 10, 2021
- Recorded: 2021
- Studio: BZRP Studio, Ramos Mejía, Buenos Aires province, Argentina
- Genre: Cumbiatón; Cumbia 420; Reggaeton
- Length: 3:12
- Label: Dale Play
- Songwriters: Elián Ángel Valenzuela; Gonzalo Julián Conde
- Producer: Bizarrap

Bizarrap singles chronology
"Ysy A: Bzrp Music Sessions, Vol. 37" (2021)	"L-Gante: Bzrp Music Sessions, Vol. 38" (2021)	"Snow Tha Product: Bzrp Music Sessions, Vol. 39" (2021)

L-Gante singles chronology
"Tinty Nasty" (2021)	"L-Gante: Bzrp Music Sessions, Vol. 38" (2021)	"Lassie" (2021)

Music video
- "L-Gante: Bzrp Music Sessions, Vol. 38" on YouTube

"L-Gante: Bzrp Music Sessions, Vol. 38" is a song by Argentine record producer Bizarrap and Argentine rapper L-Gante. It was released on March 10, 2021, through Dale Play Records. The song has more than 80 million streams on Spotify. The song reached number 1 on the Billboard Argentina Hot 100 being the first Bzrp Music Sessions to reach the top.

== Background ==
The session was announced by Bizarrap through a small trailer published on the producer's networks, in the video Bizarrap can be shown as a hotel worker, when he receives a letter and goes up in the elevator to the hotel rooms, in which You can show some previous Music Sessions until you reach the indicated room and the one that will open the door is L-Gante, thus confirming the Music Sessions of him.

L-Gante is an artist who is characterized by making Cumbias with a more modern sound either with trap or reggaeton, that characteristic sound is called Cumbia 420, something that lately sounds a lot in Argentina. The music video has more than 150 million views on YouTube.

== Lyric ==
The lyrics of the song were written by L-Gante himself, many Argentines have assured that capturing the catchy rhythm of the lyrics can confuse many foreigners since their lyrics are "very Argentine" due to their use of turras or neighborhood Argentinian words.

== Controversies ==
On March 9, 2021, a day before the session left, the singer L-Gante was arrested in San Juan, Argentina for alleged riots and breaking health regulations since he was taking photos with fans without wearing the face-masks due to the COVID-19 pandemic, he was arrested along with five other people, including a child under 15 years of age. L-Gante was able to get out of prison on bail.

== Personnel ==
Credits adapted from Genius.

- L-Gante – vocals
- Bizarrap – producer
- Evlay – mixing
- GFX Yisus – artwork
- GianLyfe – videographer

== Charts ==
Chart performance for "L-Gante: Bzrp Music Sessions, Vol. 38"
Chart (2021)	Peak position
Argentina (Argentina Hot 100)	1
Argentina National Songs (Monitor Latino)	17
Global 200 (Billboard)	171
Paraguay (SGP)	88
Spain (PROMUSICAE)	43

== Certifications ==
Certifications for "L-Gante: Bzrp Music Sessions, Vol. 38"
Region	Certification	Certified units/sales
Spain (PROMUSICAE)	Gold	20,000^{‡}
^{‡} Sales+streaming figures based on certification alone.
