= Bizarrap =

Argentine record producer (born 1998)

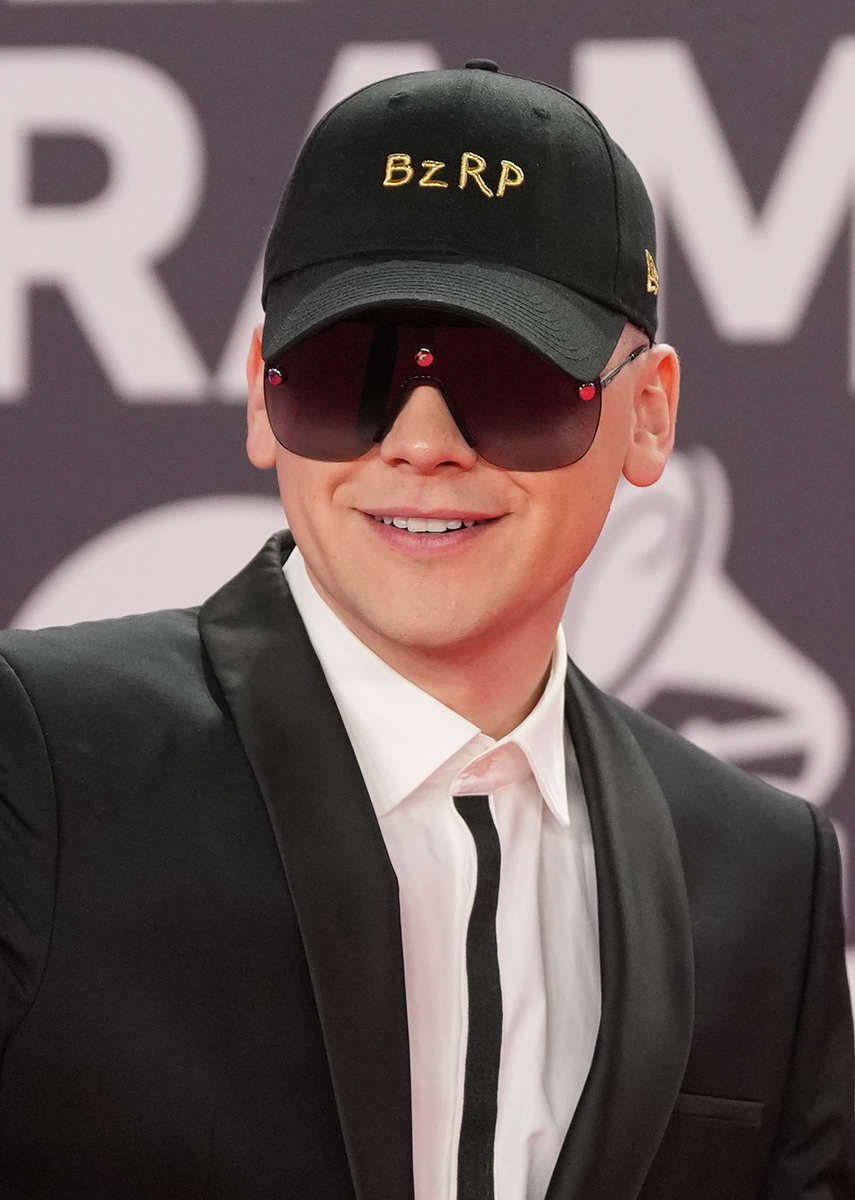
- Bizarrap at the 24th Annual Latin Grammy Awards in 2023

Background information
- Also known as: BZRP
- Born: Gonzalo Julián Conde; 29 August 1998 (age 28); Ramos Mejía, Argentina
- Genres: Latin trap; Latin hip-hop; urban pop; EDM; reggaeton; future bass
- Occupations: Record producer; songwriter; DJ
- Years active: 2017–present
- Labels: Warner Latina; Dale Play

Gonzalo Julián Conde (Latin American Spanish pronunciation: [ɡonˈsalo xuˈljan ˈkonde]; born 29 August 1998), known professionally as Bizarrap (pronounced [bisaˈrap]) or BZRP, is an Argentine record producer, songwriter and DJ. He specializes in EDM, Latin trap and Latin hip-hop. He is known for his BZRP Music Sessions, a series of independent tracks which he records with a wide variety of artists. He was nominated for a Latin Grammy Award for Producer of the Year in 2021 and 2023.

== Early life ==
Conde was born on 29 August 1998, in Ramos Mejía, Argentina. He was interested in music from a young age and had an interest in electronic music and DJs, rather than singing. His main influences were Skrillex, David Guetta, and Martin Garrix. At the age of 14, Conde began studying music theory, enrolled in piano classes, and began to produce his first songs.

== Career ==
Conde's career started in 2017 with the "Combos Locos" that he put together with highlights from local freestyle battles. That environment led him to become friends with figures like Lit Killah, Kodigo, Ecko, with whom he began remixing in parallel. His first hit came from Duki and the BZRP version of "No Vendo Trap". From there, other artists opened their doors for him to remix their songs, including Dani, Ecko, Paulo Londra and Khea. The first Freestyle Session was released on 17 November 2018 and starred Kodigo. Little by little, other referents such as G Sony and Acru joined in, and by the following February the Music Sessions arrived with Bhavi as inaugurator. Through 2019 he continued collaborating with various artists for his sessions, including both Argentine like Nicki Nicole and Trueno, and from other countries of Latin America such as Mexican rapper Alemán and Chilean singer Polimá Westcoast.

In 2020, Conde collaborated with Argentine singer Nathy Peluso for the session 36. The song was a commercial success peaking at number 4 and 121 at the Argentina Hot 100 and Billboard Global 200 charts, respectively, being his first song to appear in an American chart. Additionally, it was certified platinum in Spain. In December 2020, Bizarrap became the most listened-to Argentine artist and producer in the world with more than 11 million monthly listeners on Spotify, entering the 300 most listened to artists in the world.

The following year, Conde continued his commercial success with various collaborations. The session 38 with L-Gante topped the Argentina Hot 100 chart, being his first number-one single in the country, while the session 41 with Nicky Jam peaked at number 38 at the Hot Latin Songs, being his first entry in the chart. In 2021, Bizarrap began receiving recognition from different award groups. At the 22nd Annual Latin Grammy Awards, he received five nominations including both Best New Artist and Producer of the Year, while in his native country, he received six nominations at the 23rd Annual Gardel Awards, winning two: Best Urban/Trap Song or Album for the session with Nathy Peluso and Best Urban/Trap Collaboration for "Mamichula" with Trueno and Nicki Nicole.

In 2022, Conde achieved bigger commercial success charting in various countries from both Latin America and Europe, as well as in the United States. In July 2022, he released the session 52 with Spanish rapper Quevedo. The song topped the charts in various countries including Argentina and Spain, marking a breakthrough in Quevedo's career. It also topped the Billboard Global 200 chart and peaked at number 98 on the Billboard Hot 100 chart, being Bizarrap's first appearance in the latter. The same month, the session 39 with Snow Tha Product was certified platinum in the United States, being his first single to be certified by the RIAA. Later in the year, he released the session 53 with Colombian singer Shakira. Similar to the session with Quevedo, the song was highly commercially successful, also topping the charts in various countries and peaking at number 9 on the Billboard Hot 100 chart, being Bizarrap's highest appearance on the chart to date as well as his first top-ten single and Shakira's first top-ten single since "Beautiful Liar" (with Beyoncé) in 2007. Furthermore, the song broke several Guinness World Records for a Latin song in terms of views on YouTube and streams on Spotify.

In 2026, Conde closed the opening night at main stage at Ultra Music Festival in Miami, becoming the first Latin American DJ to do so. His set fused elements of EDM and classic techno while paying tribute to Skrillex, who had hinted to a surprise appearance. The set included some of Bizarrap’s most notable collaborations, including those with Shakira, Gorillaz, Young Miko, Peso Pluma, and Daddy Yankee, the latter of whom made a surprise live appearance. He concluded the performance with a remix of Quevedo: Bzrp Music Sessions, Vol. 52, blended with One More Time by Daft Punk. Following the set, Skrillex made a surprise appearance, and the two performed a 30-minute back-to-back (b2b) set.

== Awards and nominations ==
| Award | Year | Category | Nominated work | Result | Ref. |
|---|---|---|---|---|---|
| Billboard Music Awards | 2023 | Top Dance/Electronic Song | Shakira: Bzrp Music Sessions, Vol. 53 (with Shakira) | Nominated | |
| Billboard Latin Music Awards | 2023 | New Artist of the Year | Himself | Nominated | |
| Billboard Latin Music Awards | 2023 | Sales Song of the Year | "Shakira: Bzrp Music Sessions, Vol. 53" (with Shakira) | Nominated | |
| Billboard Latin Music Awards | 2023 | Airplay Song of the Year | "Shakira: Bzrp Music Sessions, Vol. 53" (with Shakira) | Nominated | |
| Billboard Latin Music Awards | 2023 | Latin Pop Song of the Year | "Shakira: Bzrp Music Sessions, Vol. 53" (with Shakira) | Won | |
| Billboard Latin Music Awards | 2023 | Global 200 Latin Song of the Year | "Quevedo: Bzrp Music Sessions, Vol. 52" (with Quevedo) | Nominated | |
| Billboard Latin Music Awards | 2023 | Latin Rhythm Song of the Year | "Quevedo: Bzrp Music Sessions, Vol. 52" (with Quevedo) | Nominated | |
| Heat Latin Music Awards | 2022 | Best New Artist | Himself | Nominated | |
| Heat Latin Music Awards | 2022 | Best Artist South Region | Himself | Nominated | |
| Heat Latin Music Awards | 2023 | Best Artist South Region | Himself | Won | |
| Heat Latin Music Awards | 2023 | DJ of the Year | Himself | Nominated | |
| Heat Latin Music Awards | 2023 | Song of the Year | "Shakira: Bzrp Music Sessions, Vol. 53" (with Shakira) | Nominated | |
| Heat Latin Music Awards | 2023 | Song of the Year | "Quevedo: Bzrp Music Sessions, Vol. 52" (with Quevedo) | Nominated | |
| Heat Latin Music Awards | 2024 | Producer of the Year | Bizarrap | Nominated | |
| Heat Latin Music Awards | 2024 | Best Collaboration | "Young Miko: Bzrp Music Sessions, Vol. 58" (with Young Miko) | Nominated | |
| iHeartRadio Music Awards | 2024 | Latin Pop/Reggaeton Song of the Year | "Shakira: Bzrp Music Sessions, Vol. 53" (with Shakira) | Won | |
| Guinness World Records | 2023 | Most viewed Latin track on YouTube in 24 hours (63,000,000 views) | "Shakira: Bzrp Music Sessions, Vol. 53" (with Shakira) | Won | |
| Guinness World Records | 2023 | Fastest Latin track to reach 100 million views on YouTube (70 hours) | "Shakira: Bzrp Music Sessions, Vol. 53" (with Shakira) | Won | |
| Guinness World Records | 2023 | Most streamed Latin track on Spotify in 24 hours (14,393,342 streams) | "Shakira: Bzrp Music Sessions, Vol. 53" (with Shakira) | Won | |
| Guinness World Records | 2023 | Most streamed Latin track on Spotify in one week (80,646,962 streams) | "Shakira: Bzrp Music Sessions, Vol. 53" (with Shakira) | Won | |
| Latin American Music Awards | 2023 | New Artist of the Year | Himself | Won | |
| Latin American Music Awards | 2023 | Song of the Year | "Quevedo: Bzrp Music Sessions, Vol. 52" (with Quevedo) | Nominated | |
| Latin American Music Awards | 2023 | Collaboration of the Year | "Quevedo: Bzrp Music Sessions, Vol. 52" (with Quevedo) | Nominated | |
| Latin American Music Awards | 2023 | Best Collaboration - Pop/Urban | "Quevedo: Bzrp Music Sessions, Vol. 52" (with Quevedo) | Nominated | |
| Latin American Music Awards | 2024 | Favorite Pop Artist | Himself | Nominated | |
| Latin American Music Awards | 2024 | Song of the Year | "Shakira: Bzrp Music Sessions, Vol. 53" (with Shakira) | Nominated | |
| Latin American Music Awards | 2024 | Collaboration of the Year | "Shakira: Bzrp Music Sessions, Vol. 53" (with Shakira) | Nominated | |
| Latin American Music Awards | 2024 | Global Latin Song of the Year | "Shakira: Bzrp Music Sessions, Vol. 53" (with Shakira) | Nominated | |
| Latin Grammy Awards | 2021 | Best New Artist | Himself | Nominated | |
| Latin Grammy Awards | 2021 | Producer of the Year | Himself | Nominated | |
| Latin Grammy Awards | 2021 | Best Urban Fusion/Performance | "Nathy Peluso: Bzrp Music Sessions, Vol. 36" (with Nathy Peluso) | Nominated | |
| Latin Grammy Awards | 2021 | Best Rap/Hip Hop Song | "Snow Tha Product: Bzrp Music Sessions, Vol. 39" (with Snow Tha Product) | Nominated | |
| Latin Grammy Awards | 2022 | Best Reggaeton Performance | "Nicky Jam: Bzrp Music Sessions, Vol. 41" (with Nicky Jam) | Nominated | |
| Latin Grammy Awards | 2023 | Record of the Year | "Shakira: Bzrp Music Sessions, Vol. 53" (with Shakira) | Nominated | |
| Latin Grammy Awards | 2023 | Song of the Year | "Shakira: Bzrp Music Sessions, Vol. 53" (with Shakira) | Won | |
| Latin Grammy Awards | 2023 | Best Pop Song | "Shakira: Bzrp Music Sessions, Vol. 53" (with Shakira) | Won | |
| Latin Grammy Awards | 2023 | Best Urban Fusion/Performance | "Quevedo: Bzrp Music Sessions, Vol. 52" (with Quevedo) | Nominated | |
| Latin Grammy Awards | 2023 | Best Urban Song | "Quevedo: Bzrp Music Sessions, Vol. 52" (with Quevedo) | Won | |
| Latin Grammy Awards | 2023 | Producer of the Year | Himself | Nominated | |
| Latin Grammy Awards | 2024 | Best Latin Electronic Music Performance | "Shakira: Bzrp Music Sessions, Vol. 53 (Tiësto Remix)" (with Shakira and Tiesto) | Won | |
| Latin Grammy Awards | 2024 | Best Urban Fusion/Performance | "Young Miko: Bzrp Music Sessions, Vol. 58" (with Young Miko) | Nominated | |
| Latin Grammy Awards | 2025 | Best Pop Song | "Soltera" | Nominated | |
| Los 40 Music Awards | 2022 | Best Latin Urban Act or Producer | Himself | Won | |
| Los 40 Music Awards | 2022 | Best Latin Song | "Quevedo: Bzrp Music Sessions, Vol. 52" (with Quevedo) | Nominated | |
| Los 40 Music Awards | 2022 | Best Latin Collaboration | "Quevedo: Bzrp Music Sessions, Vol. 52" (with Quevedo) | Nominated | |
| Los 40 Music Awards | 2023 | Best Latin Urban Act or Producer | Himself | Nominated | |
| Los 40 Music Awards | 2023 | Best Latin Video | "Shakira: Bzrp Music Sessions, Vol. 53" (with Shakira) | Nominated | |
| Los 40 Music Awards | 2023 | Best Latin Urban Collaboration | "Shakira: Bzrp Music Sessions, Vol. 53" (with Shakira) | Nominated | |
| MTV Europe Music Awards | 2022 | Best Latin America South Act | Himself | Nominated | |
| MTV Europe Music Awards | 2023 | Best Latin America South Act | Himself | Nominated | |
| MTV Millennial Awards | 2021 | Argentine Artist | Himself | Nominated | |
| MTV Millennial Awards | 2021 | Viral Anthem | "Nathy Peluso: Bzrp Music Sessions, Vol. 36" (with Nathy Peluso) | Nominated | |
| MTV Millennial Awards | 2022 | Argentine Artist | Himself | Nominated | |
| MTV Millennial Awards | 2022 | Music Ship of the Year | "Residente: Bzrp Music Sessions, Vol. 49" (with Residente) | Nominated | |
| MTV Millennial Awards | 2023 | Music Ship of the Year | "Shakira: Bzrp Music Sessions, Vol. 53" (with Shakira) | Nominated | |
| MTV Millennial Awards | 2023 | Viral Anthem | "Shakira: Bzrp Music Sessions, Vol. 53" (with Shakira) | Nominated | |
| MTV Millennial Awards | 2024 | MIAW Artist | Bizarrap | Nominated | |
| MTV Millennial Awards | 2024 | Collaboration of the Year | "Young Miko: Bzrp Music Sessions, Vol. 58" (with Young Miko) | Nominated | |
| Premios Gardel | 2021 | Song of the Year | "Nathy Peluso: Bzrp Music Sessions, Vol. 36" (with Nathy Peluso) | Nominated | |
| Premios Gardel | 2021 | Best Music Video | "Nathy Peluso: Bzrp Music Sessions, Vol. 36" (with Nathy Peluso) | Nominated | |
| Premios Gardel | 2021 | Best Urban/Trap Song or Album | "Nathy Peluso: Bzrp Music Sessions, Vol. 36" (with Nathy Peluso) | Won | |
| Premios Gardel | 2021 | Best Urban/Trap Song or Album | "Mamichula" (with Trueno and Nicki Nicole) | Nominated | |
| Premios Gardel | 2021 | Best Urban/Trap Collaboration | "Mamichula" (with Trueno and Nicki Nicole) | Won | |
| Premios Gardel | 2021 | Best Urban/Trap Collaboration | "Verte" (with Nicki Nicole and Dread Mar I) | Nominated | |
| Premios Gardel | 2022 | Producer of the Year | Himself | Nominated | |
| Premios Gardel | 2022 | Best Urban Music Song | "Tiago PZK: Bzrp Music Sessions Vol. 48" (with Tiago PZK) | Nominated | |
| Premios Gardel | 2022 | Best Urban Music Collaboration | "L-Gante: Bzrp Music Sessions, Vol. 38" (with L-Gante) | Nominated | |
| Premios Gardel | 2023 | Song of the Year | "Quevedo: Bzrp Music Sessions, Vol. 52" (with Quevedo) | Nominated | |
| Premios Gardel | 2023 | Record of the Year | "Quevedo: Bzrp Music Sessions, Vol. 52" (with Quevedo) | Nominated | |
| Premios Gardel | 2023 | Best Urban Music Song | "Quevedo: Bzrp Music Sessions, Vol. 52" (with Quevedo) | Won | |
| Premios Gardel | 2023 | Best Urban Music Collaboration | "Duki: Bzrp Music Sessions, Vol. 50" (with Duki) | Nominated | |
| Premios Gardel | 2024 | Song of the Year | "Shakira: Bzrp Music Sessions, Vol. 53" (with Shakira) | Nominated | |
| Premios Gardel | 2024 | Record of the Year | "Shakira: Bzrp Music Sessions, Vol. 53" (with Shakira) | Nominated | |
| Premios Gardel | 2024 | Collaboration of the Year | "Shakira: Bzrp Music Sessions, Vol. 53" (with Shakira) | Won | |
| Premios Gardel | 2024 | Best Urban Pop Song | "Shakira: Bzrp Music Sessions, Vol. 53" (with Shakira) | Won | |
| Premios Gardel | 2024 | Best Urban Album | En Dormir Sin Madrid (with Milo J) | Nominated | |
| Premios Gardel | 2024 | Best Long Form Music Video | En Dormir Sin Madrid (with Milo J) | Nominated | |
| Premios Gardel | 2024 | Best Urban Song | "Fruto" (wirh Milo J) | Won | |
| Premios Gardel | 2024 | Best Urban Song | "Remember Me" (with Duki & Khea) | Nominated | |
| Premios Gardel | 2024 | Best Urban Collaboration | "Remember Me" (with Duki & Khea) | Nominated | |
| Premios Gardel | 2024 | Best Urban Collaboration | "Milo J: Bzrp Music Sessions, Vol. 57" (with Milo J) | Nominated | |
| Premios Juventud | 2023 | The New Generation – Male | Himself | Won | |
| Premios Juventud | 2023 | My Favorite Streaming Artist | Himself | Nominated | |
| Premios Juventud | 2023 | The Best Beatmakers | Himself | Won | |
| Premios Juventud | 2023 | Best Song for My Ex | "Shakira: Bzrp Music Sessions, Vol. 53" (with Shakira) | Won | |
| Premios Juventud | 2023 | Best Pop/Urban Song | "Shakira: Bzrp Music Sessions, Vol. 53" (with Shakira) | Won | |
| Premios Juventud | 2023 | Best Pop/Urban Collaboration | "Quevedo: Bzrp Music Sessions, Vol. 52" (with Quevedo) | Nominated | |
| Premios Juventud | 2024 | The Best Beatmakers | Himself | Won | |
| Premios Juventud | 2024 | Favorite Dance Track | "Rauw Alejandro: Bzrp Music Sessions, Vol. 56" (with Rauw Alejandro) | Nominated | |
| Premios Juventud | 2024 | Best Pop/Urban Collaboration | "Baby Hello" (with Rauw Alejandro) | Nominated | |
| Premios Juventud | 2024 | Best Regional Mexican Fusion | "Peso Pluma: Bzrp Music Sessions, Vol. 55" (with Peso Pluma) | Nominated | |
| Premio Lo Nuestro | 2023 | New Artist – Male | Himself | Won | |
| Premio Lo Nuestro | 2023 | DJ of the Year | Himself | Won | |
| Premio Lo Nuestro | 2023 | Urban Dance/Pop Song of the Year | "Quevedo: Bzrp Music Sessions, Vol. 52" (with Quevedo) | Won | |
| Premio Lo Nuestro | 2024 | Song of the Year | "Shakira: Bzrp Music Sessions, Vol. 53" (with Shakira) | Won | |
| Premio Lo Nuestro | 2024 | Urban/Pop Collaboration of the Year | "Shakira: Bzrp Music Sessions, Vol. 53" (with Shakira) | Won | |
| Premio Lo Nuestro | 2024 | The Perfect Mix of the Year | "Peso Pluma: Bzrp Music Sessions, Vol. 55" (with Peso Pluma) | Nominated | |
| Premio Lo Nuestro | 2024 | Remix of the Year | "Quédate Tiësto Remix" (with Tiësto) | Nominated | |
| Premios Nuestra Tierra | 2024 | Song of the Year | "Shakira: Bzrp Music Sessions, Vol. 53" (with Shakira) | Nominated | |
| Premios Nuestra Tierra | 2024 | Best Urban Collaboration | "Shakira: Bzrp Music Sessions, Vol. 53" (with Shakira) | Nominated | |
| Premios Nuestra Tierra | 2024 | Best Dance-Electronic Song | "Shakira: Bzrp Music Sessions, Vol. 53" (with Shakira) | Won | |
| Premios Odeón | 2022 | Breakthrough Artist - International | Himself | Nominated | |
| Premios Odeón | 2023 | Song of the Year | "Quevedo: Bzrp Music Sessions, Vol. 52" (with Quevedo) | Won | |
| Premios Odeón | 2023 | Video of the Year | "Quevedo: Bzrp Music Sessions, Vol. 52" (with Quevedo) | Won | |
| Premios Odeón | 2024 | Best Latin Song | "Shakira: Bzrp Music Sessions, Vol. 53" (with Shakira) | Won | |
| Premios Tu Música Urbano | 2022 | Top Music Producer | Himself | Won | |
| Premios Tu Música Urbano | 2022 | Top Song — Trap | "Eladio Carrión: Bzrp Music Sessions, Vol.40" (with Eladio Carrión) | Nominated | |
| Premios Tu Música Urbano | 2023 | Top Music Producer | Himself | Won | |
| Premios Tu Música Urbano | 2023 | Song of the Year | "Quevedo: Bzrp Music Sessions, Vol. 52" (with Quevedo) | Nominated | |
| Premios Tu Música Urbano | 2023 | Top Song – Pop Urban | "Shakira: Bzrp Music Sessions, Vol. 53" (with Shakira) | Nominated | |
| Rolling Stone en Español Awards | 2023 | Artist of the Year | Himself | Nominated | |
| Rolling Stone en Español Awards | 2023 | Music Producer of the Year | Himself | Nominated | |
| Rolling Stone en Español Awards | 2023 | Song of the Year | "Villano Antillano: Bzrp Music Sessions, Vol. 51" (with Villano Antillano) | Won | |
