= Tini discography =

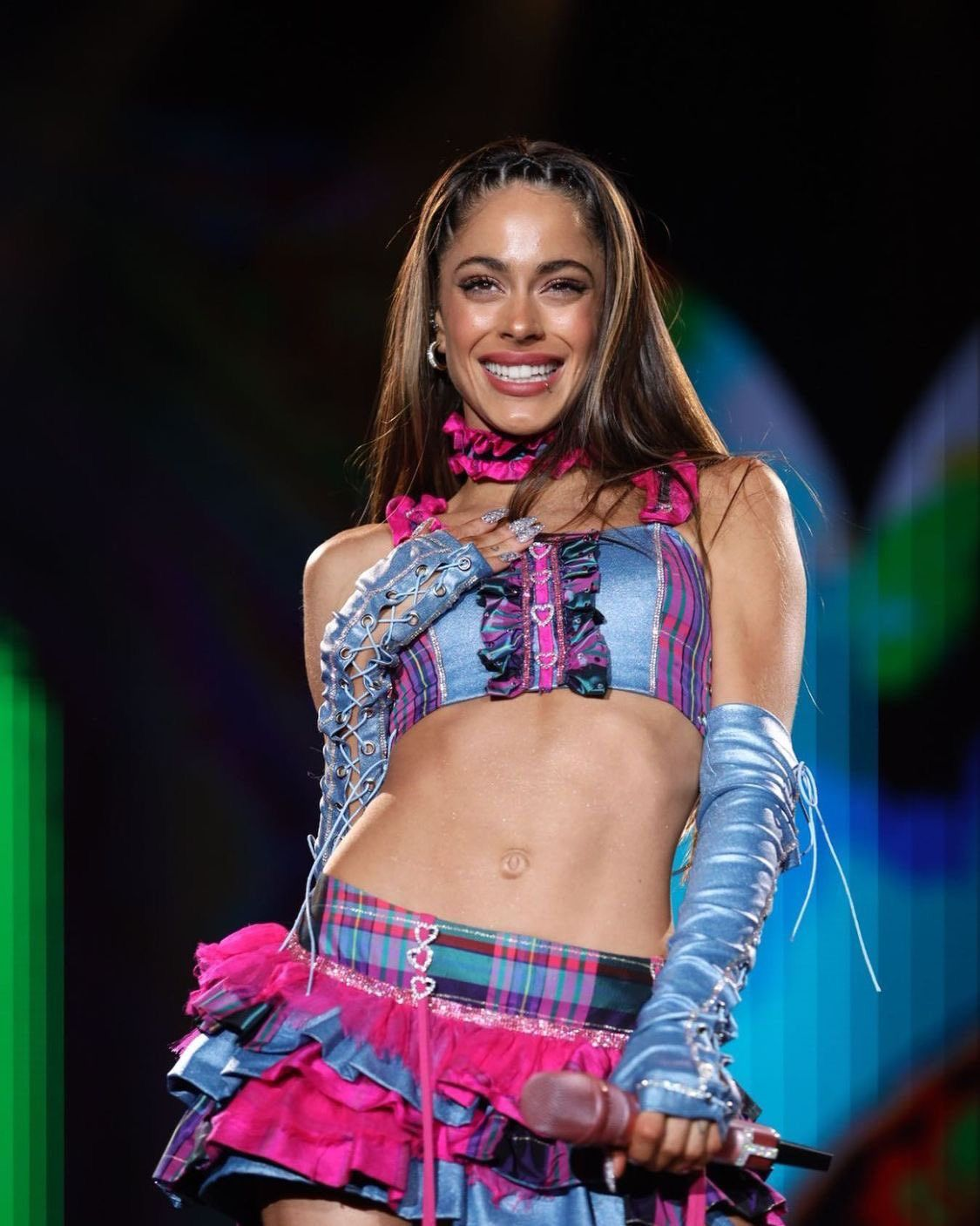
- Tini performing during Tini Tour in 2022
- Studio albums: 5
- Soundtrack albums: 6
- Live albums: 2
- Singles: 55
- Promotional singles: 10

Argentine singer Tini has released five studio albums, two live albums, six soundtrack albums, fifty-five singles (including nine as a featured artist) and ten promotional singles. Tini has over 10 billion combined audio and video streams, and is one of the most influential Latin singers-songwriters worldwide.

She first appeared in multiple tracks from the soundtracks of 2012 Disney's Violetta. The albums received multiple gold and platinum certifications in Argentina and various European countries. She became the first Latin act to sign with Hollywood Records. After signing with them she released her bilingual pop self-titled debut album Tini (Martina Stoessel) (2016). The album also included the soundtrack for Tini: The Movie. It debuted at No. 1 in Argentina, as well as the top 10 in various charts in European countries. Upon its release, the album has selling over 100,000 copies worldwide in less than two months, and received Gold certification by the Argentine Chamber of Phonograms and Videograms Producers (CAPIF). After signing with Universal Music Latino, she explored Latin pop and reggae on Quiero Volver (2018), her second chart-topping album in Argentina. Tini recalibrated her image to reggaeton with the Latin trap-infused Tini Tini Tini (2020), which became the best-selling album by a woman in Argentina and the only female album to be certified double diamond by the CAPIF.

Shifting to Sony Music Latin and 5020 Records in 2021, she embraced urbano and cumbia styles on her third album Cupido (2023), which featured her first three Billboard Argentina Hot 100 number-ones: "Miénteme", "Bar", and "La Triple T", and her three Billboard US Latin Pop Airplay top 25 entries: "Maldita Foto", "La Loto" and "Cupido". Certified diamond by CAPIF, and double platinum (Latin) in the US by the Recording Industry Association of America (RIAA), the album was the first by an Argentine act this decade to reach the top ten on the Billboard US Latin Pop Albums and top 50 on the Billboard Top Latin Albums charts. It also made Tini the first Argentine woman to chart on the Billboard Global 200 and Global Excl. US. Tini achieved her fourth number-one Argentina Hot 100 with the collaboration "La Original" with Emilia. Personal struggles influenced the alternative Un Mechón de Pelo (2024), which yielded her fifth Argentina Hot 100 number-one "Pa". In August 2024, she made her first chart entry on the US Billboard Hot 100 and Canadian Hot 100.

== Albums ==
=== Studio albums ===
List of studio albums, with selected details, chart positions, sales, and certifications
Title	Album details	Peak chart positions										Certifications
Title	Album details	ARG	AUT	BEL (FL)	FRA	GER	ITA	POL	SPA	SWI	US Latin	Certifications
Tini (Martina Stoessel)	Released: April 29, 2016; Label: Hollywood; Formats: CD, digital download, streaming	1	3	17	13	6	6	9	12	37	—	CAPIF: Gold; IFPI AUT: Gold; ZPAV: Gold
Quiero Volver	Released: October 12, 2018; Label: Hollywood, Universal Latin; Formats: CD, digital download, streaming	1	22	138	106	26	77	49	11	40	—	
Tini Tini Tini	Released: December 3, 2020; Label: Hollywood, Universal Latin; Formats: CD, digital download, streaming	2	—	184	—	—	—	—	40	—	—	CAPIF: 2× Diamond (Digital)
Cupido	Released: February 16, 2023; Label: Hollywood, Sony Latin; Formats: CD, digital download, streaming	3	—	—	—	—	—	—	5	—	45	AMPROFON: Gold; CAPIF: 5× Platinum; PROMUSICAE: Gold; RIAA: 3× Platinum (Latin)
Un Mechón de Pelo	Released: April 11, 2024; Label: Hollywood, 5020, Sony Latin; Formats: Digital download, streaming	—	—	—	—	—	—	—	14	—	—	
"—" denotes a recording that did not chart or was not released in that territory.

=== Live albums ===
List of live albums with selected details
Title	Details
Un Mechón de Pelo (En Vivo)	Released: 31 July 2024; Label: Hollywood, 5020, Sony Latin; Formats: Digital download, streaming
Futttura Live	Released: 22 October 2026; Label: Hollywood, Sony Latin; Formats: Digital download, streaming

== Singles ==
=== As lead artist ===
List of singles as lead artist, showing year released, with selected chart positions, certifications and album name
Title	Year	Peak chart positions										Certifications	Album
Title	Year	ARG	BOL	ECU	MEX	PAR	SPA	URU	US Latin	US Latin Pop	WW	Certifications	Album
"Libre Soy"	2013	—	—	—	—	—	29	—	—	—	—		Frozen
"Siempre Brillarás" (Note: "Siempre Brillarás" as also released in English as "Born to Shine".)	2016	— (Note: "Siempre Brillarás" did not enter the Billboard Argentina Hot 100, but peaked at number 8 on the Monitor Latino Argentina National Songs chart.)	—	—	—	—	—	—	—	—	—		Tini (Martina Stoessel)
"Great Escape" (Note: "Great Escape" was also released in Spanish as "Yo Me Escaparé".)	2016	— (Note: "Yo Me Escaparé" did not enter the Billboard Argentina Hot 100, but peaked at number 12 on the Monitor Latino Argentina National Songs chart.)	—	—	—	—	—	—	—	—	—		Tini (Martina Stoessel)
"Got Me Started" (Note: "Got Me Started" was also released in Spanish as "Ya No Hay Nadie Que Nos Pare" featuring Sebastián Yatra. The English-language version did not feature Yatra.) (solo or featuring Sebastián Yatra)	2016	— (Note: "Ya No Hay Nadie que Nos Pare" did not enter the Billboard Argentina Hot 100, but peaked at number 6 on the Monitor Latino Argentina National Songs chart.)	—	—	—	—	—	—	—	—	—		Tini (Martina Stoessel)
"Si Tu Te Vas"	2017	—	—	—	—	—	—	—	—	—	—		Tini (Martina Stoessel)
"Te Quiero Más" (with Nacho)	2017	13	—	16	— (Note: "Te Quiero Más" did not enter the Billboard Mexico Airplay chart, but peaked at number 37 on the Mexico Espanol Airplay chart.)	—	—	7	—	—	—	CAPIF: Platinum; CUD: Gold	Quiero Volver
"Princesa" (with Karol G)	2018	69	—	14	8	—	—	—	— (Note: "Princesa" did not enter the Billboard Hot Latin Songs chart, but it peaked at number 49 on the Billboard Latin Airplay chart.)	17	—	CAPIF: Gold	Quiero Volver
"Consejo de Amor" (featuring Morat)	2018	33	—	65	—	—	—	—	—	—	—	CUD: Gold; PROMUSICAE: Platinum	Quiero Volver
"Quiero Volver" (with Sebastián Yatra)	2018	21	—	49	41	—	—	— (Note: "Quiero Volver" did not enter the Monitor Latino Uruguayan Airplay chart, but peaked at number 16 on the Uruguayan Latin Airplay chart.)	—	—	—	CUD: Platinum	Quiero Volver
"Por Que Te Vas" (with Cali y El Dandee)	2018	17	—	—	—	—	—	—	—	—	—	CUD: Gold	Quiero Volver
"22" (with Greeicy)	2019	8	—	5	—	70	—	5	—	—	—	CAPIF: Platinum; CUD: Gold	Tini Tini Tini
"Suéltate el Pelo"	2019	46	—	—	—	88	—	—	—	—	—		Tini Tini Tini
"Fresa" (with Lalo Ebratt)	2019	3	—	78	—	63	—	4	—	—	—	CAPIF: 2× Platinum; ASINCOL: Gold; PROMUSICAE: Gold	Tini Tini Tini
"Oye" (with Sebastián Yatra)	2019	3	—	1	—	41	72	8	— (Note: "Oye" did not enter the Billboard Hot Latin Songs chart, but it peaked at number 22 on the Billboard Latin Digital Song Sales chart.)	—	—	AMPROFON: Gold; ASINCOL: Platinum; CAPIF: Platinum; IFPI ECU: Platinum; PROMUSICAE: Gold	Tini Tini Tini
"Recuerdo" (with Mau y Ricky)	2020	12	—	15	—	75	—	9	—	—	—		Tini Tini Tini
"Ya No Me Llames" (with Ovy on the Drums)	2020	15	—	14	—	78	—	—	—	—	—		Non-album singles
"Bésame (I Need You)" (with R3hab and Reik)	2020	— (Note: "Bésame (I Need You)" did not enter the Billboard Argentina Hot 100, but peaked at number nine on the Monitor Latino Argentina Anglo Songs chart.)	—	—	—	—	—	— (Note: "Bésame (I Need You)" did not enter the Monitor Latino Uruguayan Airplay chart, but peaked at number five on the Monitor Latino Uruguayan Anglo Songs chart.)	—	—	—		Non-album singles
"Ella Dice" (with Khea)	2020	4	—	8	— (Note: "Ella Dice" did not enter the Billboard Mexico Airplay chart, but peaked at number one on Monitor Latino's Mexico Airplay Top 20 chart.)	41	—	8	—	—	—	CAPIF: Gold	Tini Tini Tini
"High" (Remix) (with María Becerra and Lola Índigo)	2020	2	—	—	—	76	62	—	—	—	—		Non-album single
"Duele" (featuring John C)	2020	10	—	— (Note: "Duele" did not enter the Monitor Latino Ecuatorian Airplay chart, but peaked at number 16 on the Monitor Latino Ecuatorian Pop Songs chart.)	—	—	—	13	—	—	—		Tini Tini Tini
"Un Beso en Madrid" (with Alejandro Sanz)	2020	19	—	— (Note: "Un Beso en Madrid" did not enter the Monitor Latino Ecuatorian Airplay chart, but peaked at number eight on the Monitor Latino Ecuatorian Pop Songs chart.)	11	78	49	8	—	—	—	PROMUSICAE: Platinum	Tini Tini Tini
"Te Olvidaré"	2020	70	—	—	—	—	—	—	—	—	—		Tini Tini Tini
"Playa" (Note: Limited Argentine radio release.)	2021	70	—	—	—	—	—	—	—	—	—		Tini Tini Tini
"Miénteme" (with María Becerra)	2021	1	9	7	— (Note: "Miénteme" did not enter the Billboard Mexico Airplay chart, but peaked at number 18 on the Mexico Espanol Airplay chart.)	2	3	1	— (Note: "Miénteme" did not enter the Billboard Hot Latin Songs chart, but it peaked at number 20 on the Billboard Latin Rhythm Airplay chart.)	—	65	AMPROFON: Diamond; ASINCOL: Gold; CAPIF: Diamond; CUD: 3× Platinum; PMB: Gold; PROMUSICAE: 7× Platinum	Cupido
"2:50" (Remix) (with MYA and Duki)	2021	3	—	—	—	17	41	9	—	—	136	CAPIF: 2× Platinum; CUD: 2× Platinum; PROMUSICAE: Platinum	Suena MYA!
"La Niña de la Escuela" (with Lola Índigo and Belinda)	2021	37	—	11	—	39	9	9	—	—	—	PROMUSICAE: 5× Platinum	La Niña
"Maldita Foto" (with Manuel Turizo)	2021	11	—	—	17	19	87	3	—	15	—	CAPIF: Platinum; CUD: Platinum; PROMUSICAE: Gold	Cupido
"Tú No Me Conoces" (with Danny Ocean)	2021	29	—	—	—	99	—	—	—	—	—		@dannocean
"Bar" (with L-Gante)	2021	1	3	—	—	3	78	2	—	—	125	CAPIF: 3× Platinum; CUD: 3× Platinum; PROMUSICAE: Platinum	Cupido
"Fantasi" (with Beéle)	2022	6	24	—	—	91	94	11	—	—	—	CAPIF: 2× Platinum; CUD: Gold; PROMUSICAE: Gold	Cupido
"La Triple T"	2022	1	22	—	—	5	—	1	—	—	— (Note: "La Triple T" did not enter the Billboard Global 200 chart, but it peaked at number 159 on the Billboard Global Excl. US chart.)	AMPROFON: Gold; CAPIF: 2× Platinum; IFPI ECU: Gold; PROMUSICAE: Platinum	Cupido
"Carne y Hueso"	2022	12	—	—	—	—	—	—	—	—	—	CAPIF: Platinum	Cupido
"Suéltame" (with Christina Aguilera)	2022	—	—	—	— (Note: "Suéltame" did not enter the Billboard Mexico Airplay chart, but peaked at number 19 on the Mexico Espanol Airplay chart.)	—	—	—	—	23	—		La Tormenta and Aguilera
"La Loto" (with Becky G and Anitta)	2022	7	—	—	23	—	78	9	— (Note: "La Loto" did not enter the Billboard Hot Latin Songs chart, but it peaked at number 16 on the Billboard Latin Digital Song Sales chart.)	8	197	AMPROFON: Gold; CAPIF: Platinum; PMB: Gold; PROMUSICAE: Gold	Cupido
"El Último Beso" (with Tiago PZK)	2022	7	—	—	—	11	—	2	—	—	—	CAPIF: Platinum	Cupido
"Muñecas" (Note: "Muñecas" is also included on Steve Aoki eighth studio album Hiroquest 2: Double Helix.) (with La Joaqui and Steve Aoki)	2023	3	25	—	—	—	41	13	—	—	— (Note: "Muñecas" did not enter the Billboard Global 200 chart, but it peaked at number 117 on the Billboard Global Excl. US chart.)	PROMUSICAE: Platinum	Cupido
"Por el Resto de Tu Vida" (with Christian Nodal)	2023	63	—	—	—	—	—	—	— (Note: "Por el Resto de Tu Vida" did not enter the Billboard Hot Latin Songs chart, but it peaked at number ten on the Billboard Latin Digital Song Sales chart.)	14	—	AMPROFON: 3× Platinum+Gold; PROMUSICAE: Platinum	Forajido 2
"Cupido"	2023	3	11	—	—	13	6	6	—	23	69	AMPROFON: Platinum; PROMUSICAE: 5× Platinum; RIAA: 4× Platinum (Latin)	Cupido
"Me Enteré" (with Tiago PZK)	2023	6	—	—	—	70	77	13	—	—	— (Note: "Me Enteré" did not enter the Billboard Global 200 chart, but it peaked at number 193 on the Billboard Global Excl. US chart.)	PROMUSICAE: Gold	Non-album singles
"Lágrimas" (Note: Subtitled "Crossover #4".) (with Big One and BM)	2023	6	—	—	—	—	—	15	—	—	—		Non-album singles
"La Original" (Note: Stylized as "La_Original.mp3".) (with Emilia)	2023	1	—	—	—	—	8	—	— (Note: "La Original" did not enter the Billboard Hot Latin Songs chart, but it peaked at number 26 on the Billboard Latin Airplay chart.)	3	170	AMPROFON: Gold; PROMUSICAE: 4× Platinum; RIAA: Gold (Latin)	.MP3
"Pa"	2024	1	—	—	—	—	52	—	—	—	— (Note: "Pa" did not enter the Billboard Global 200 chart, but it peaked at number 180 on the Billboard Global Excl. US chart.)	PROMUSICAE: Gold	Un Mechón de Pelo
"Posta"	2024	24	—	—	—	—	—	—	—	—	—		Un Mechón de Pelo
"Buenos Aires"	2024	12	—	—	—	—	—	16	—	—	—		Un Mechón de Pelo
"Agua" (with Ca7riel & Paco Amoroso)	2024	96	—	—	—	—	—	—	—	—	—		Baño María
"El Cielo"	2024	5	—	—	—	—	—	—	—	—	—		TBA
"Lo Que Me Causa" (with Milo J)	2025	35	—	—	—	—	—	—	—	—	—		166 (Deluxe) Retirada
"Blackout" (with Emilia and Nicki Nicole)	2025	1	—	—	—	—	8	5	— (Note: "Blackout" did not enter the Billboard Hot Latin Songs chart, but it peaked at number 24 on the Billboard Latin Rhythm Airplay chart.)	21	— (Note: "Blackout" did not enter the Billboard Global 200 chart, but it peaked at number 119 on the Billboard Global Excl. US chart.)	PROMUSICAE: Platinum; RIAA: Gold (Latin)	Perfectas
"Me Gusta" (with Miranda!)	2025	8	—	—	—	80	—	—	—	—	—		Nuevo Hotel Miranda!
"Universidad" (with Beéle)	2025	4	—	—	—	10	—	2	—	—	—	PROMUSICAE: Gold	TBA
"De Papel"	2025	25	—	—	—	—	—	—	—	—	—		TBA
"Hasta Que Me Enamoro" (with María Becerra)	2025	3	—	—	—	— (Note: "Hasta Que Me Enamoro" did not enter the SGP Paraguay Airplay chart, but it peaked at number 11 on the Monitor Latino Paraguay Airplay chart.)	95	3	—	—	—		Quimera
"Una Noche Más"	2025	19	—	—	—	56	—	12	—	—	—		TBA
"Down"	2025	28	—	—	—	—	—	—	—	—	—		TBA
"36 Vidas"	2025	23	—	—	—	98	—	— (Note: "36 Vidas" did not enter the Monitor Latino Uruguay Airplay chart, but it peaked at number seven on the Monitor Latino Uruguay Tropical Airplay chart.)	—	—	—		TBA
"Dos Amantes" (with Ulises Bueno)	2026	4	—	— (Note: "Dos Amantes" peaked at number 17 on the Monitor Latino Ecuador Pop Airplay chart.)	—	— (Note: "Dos Amantes" peaked at number ten on the Monitor Latino Paraguay Pop Airplay chart.)	—	1	—	—	—		TBA
"Vuelve" (with Ricky Martin and Los Ángeles Azules)	2026	3	— (Note: "Vuelve" did not enter the Billboard Bolivia Songs chart, but it peaked at number one on the Monitor Latino Bolivia Airplay chart.)	— (Note: "Vuelve" peaked at number 17 on the Monitor Latino Ecuador Tropical Airplay chart.)	— (Note: "Vuelve" peaked at number seven on the Monitor Latino Mexico Pop Airplay chart.)	39	—	3	43	20	—		Non-album singles
"Pa' Él" (with Los Ángeles Azules)	2026	75	— (Note: "Pa' Él" did not enter the Billboard Bolivia Songs chart, but it peaked at number two on the Monitor Latino Bolivia Airplay chart.)	—	7	12	—	2	34	—	—		Non-album singles
"—" denotes a recording that did not chart or was not released in that territory.

=== As a featured artist ===
List of singles as a featured artist released, showing year released, selected chart positions and originating album
Title	Year	Peak chart positions										Certifications	Album
Title	Year	ARG	AUT	FRA	GER	NZ Hot	SPA	SWE	SWI	UK	US	Certifications	Album
"Todo es Posible" (Note: "Todo es Posible" was released as a standalone single for the movie Tadeo Jones 2: El secreto del Rey Midas.) (David Bisbal featuring Tini)	2017	—	—	—	—	—	—	—	—	—	—		20 Años Contigo
"Y Apareciste Tu" (Cacho Castaña featuring Tini)	2017	—	—	—	—	—	—	—	—	—	—		Cacho y Sus Amigos: Concierto Inolvidable (Live in Buenos Aires / 2016)
"Lights Down Low" (Latin Mix or Urban) (MAX featuring Tini and Daneon)	2017	—	—	—	—	—	—	—	—	—	—		Hell's Kitchen Angel
"La Cintura" (Remix) (Alvaro Soler featuring Flo Rida and Tini)	2018	72	—	—	—	—	—	—	—	—	—	BVMI: Platinum; IFPI AUT: Platinum	Mar de Colores
"Lo Malo" (Remix) (Aitana and Ana Guerra featuring Greeicy and Tini)	2018	—	—	—	—	—	—	—	—	—	—		Reflexión
"Wild" (Jonas Blue featuring Chelcee Grimes, Tini and Jhay Cortez)	2019	—	—	—	—	—	—	—	—	—	—		Blue
"Sad Song" (Alesso featuring Tini)	2019	—	—	—	—	27	—	88	—	—	—		Non-album singles
"La Ducha" (Remix) (Elena Rose, María Becerra and Greeicy featuring Becky G and Tini)	2022	—	—	—	—	—	—	—	—	—	—		Non-album singles
"We Pray" (Coldplay featuring Little Simz, Burna Boy, Elyanna and Tini)	2024	36	28	45	40	7	53	79	32	20	87	BPI: Silver; IFPI AUT: Gold; PROMUSICAE: Platinum; RMNZ: Gold; SNEP: Platinum	Moon Music
"Strangers" (JP Saxe featuring Tini)	2025	—	—	—	—	—	—	—	—	—	—		Make Yourself At Home
"—" denotes a recording that did not chart or was not released in that territory.

=== Promotional singles ===
List of promotional singles, showing year released and album name
Title	Year	Album
"En Mi Mundo" / "Nel Mio Mondo"	2012	Violetta
"Hoy Somos Más"	2013	Hoy Somos Más
"In My Own World"	2013	Disney Channel Play It Loud
"En Gira" (with Violetta cast)	2014	Gira Mi Canción
"Yo Te Amo a Ti" (with Jorge Blanco)	2016	Tini (Martina Stoessel)
"Losing the Love"	2016	Tini (Martina Stoessel)
"Somos el Cambio" (with Odino Faccia)	2017	Non-album promotional single
"La Reina de La Bailanta" (Bis) (Cacho Castaña featuring various artists (Note: The list of artists included Tini, Raúl Lavié, Marcela Morelo, Alejandro Lerner, Adriana Varela, Palito Ortega, Sandra Mihanovich, Daniel Agostini, Ariel Pucheta, Gladys Quiroz, Rocío Quiroz and Valeria Lynch.))	2017	Cacho y Sus Amigos: Concierto Inolvidable (Live in Buenos Aires / 2016)
"Diciembre"	2019	Tini Tini Tini
"Aquí Estoy"	2021	Non-album promotional single

== Other charted songs ==
List of other charted songs, showing year released, with selected chart positions and album name
Title	Year	Peak positions	Album
Title	Year	ARG	Album
"Te Pido"	2023	58	Cupido
"Las Jordans"	2023	53	Cupido
"Miedo"	2024	100	Un Mechón de Pelo
"Ni de Ti"	2024	38	Un Mechón de Pelo
"Ángel"	2024	37	Un Mechón de Pelo
"Tinta 90"	2024	53	Un Mechón de Pelo

== Guest appearances ==
List of other appearances, showing year released, other artist(s) credited and album name
Title	Year	Other artist(s)	Album
"Tu Resplandor"	2012	—N/a	Disney Princesas: Canciones de las Princesas
"It's a Lie"	2017	The Vamps	Night & Day
"Vueltas en Tu Mente"	2021	—N/a	Koati
"Un Reel"	2022	Ozuna	Ozutochi
"Muñecas (Steve Aoki Remix)"	2024	Steve Aoki, La Joaqui	Hiroquest 2: Double Helix Remixed

== Music videos ==
Title	Year	Directed by	Description
"Tu Resplandor"	2011	—N/a	Spanish version of Shannon Saunders' song "The Glow"
"Entre Tú y Yo" (with Pablo Espinosa)	2012	Jorge Nisco; Martín Saban	Violetta season 1, episode 11
"En Mi Mundo"	2012	Jorge Nisco; Martín Saban	Violetta season 1, episode 15; promo video for season 1
"Tienes Todo" (with Pablo Espinosa)	2012	Jorge Nisco; Martín Saban	Violetta season 1, episode 23
"Te Creo"	2012	Jorge Nisco; Martín Saban	Violetta season 1, episode 40
"Habla Si Puedes"	2012	Jorge Nisco; Martín Saban	Violetta season 1, episode 43
"Junto a Ti" (with Lodovica Comello)	2012	Jorge Nisco; Martín Saban	Violetta season 1, episode 68
"Ven y Canta" (with Violetta cast)	2012	Jorge Nisco; Martín Saban	Violetta season 1, episode 70
"Ser Mejor" (with Violetta cast)	2012	Jorge Nisco; Martín Saban	Violetta season 1, episode 80
"Nel Mio Mondo"	2012	Jorge Nisco; Martín Saban	Italian version of "En Mi Mundo"; premiered exclusively on Disney Channel Italy
"Hoy Somos Más"	2013	Jorge Nisco; Martín Saban	Promo video for Violetta season 2
"Euforia" (with Violetta cast)	2013	Jorge Nisco; Martín Saban	Violetta season 2, episode 20
"Codigo Amistad" (with Lodovica Comello and Candelaria Molfese)	2013	Jorge Nisco; Martín Saban	Violetta season 2, episode 33
"On Beat" (with Violetta cast)	2013	Jorge Nisco; Martín Saban	Violetta season 2, episode 40
"Como Quieres"	2013	Jorge Nisco; Martín Saban	Violetta season 2, episode 40
"Algo Se Enciende" (with Violetta cast)	2013	Jorge Nisco; Martín Saban	Violetta season 2, episode 66
"Nuestro Camino" (with Jorge Blanco)	2013	Jorge Nisco; Martín Saban	Violetta season 2, episode 67
"Si es Por Amor" (with Mercedes Lambre)	2013	Jorge Nisco; Martín Saban	Violetta season 2, episode 78
"Soy Mi Mejor Momento"	2013	Jorge Nisco; Martín Saban	Violetta season 2, episode 80
"Esto No Puede Terminar" (with Violetta cast)	2013	Jorge Nisco; Martín Saban	Violetta season 2, episode 80
"Libre Soy"	2013	—N/a	Spanish version of Idina Menzel's song "Let It Go"
"All'alba Sorgerò"	2013	—N/a	Italian version of Idina Menzel's song "Let It Go"
"Il Mio Migliore Momento"	2014	Jorge Nisco; Martín Saban	Italian version of "Soy Mi Mejor Momento"; premiered only on Disney Channel Italy
"En Gira" (with Violetta cast)	2014	Jorge Nisco; Martín Saban	Violetta season 3, episode 1; promo video for season 3
"Supercreativa"	2014	Jorge Nisco; Martín Saban	Violetta season 3, episode 20
"Friends 'till the End" (with Violetta cast)	2014	Jorge Nisco; Martín Saban	Violetta season 3, episode 53
"Abrázame y Verás" (with Jorge Blanco)	2015	Jorge Nisco; Martín Saban	Violetta season 3, episode 80
"Crecimos Juntos" (with Violetta cast)	2015	Jorge Nisco; Martín Saban	Violetta season 3, episode 80
"Siempre Brillarás"	2016	Phil Andelman	Features scenes from Tini: The Movie
"Born to Shine"	2016	Phil Andelman	English version of "Siempre Brillarás"
"Yo Te Amo a Ti" (with Jorge Blanco)	2016	Phil Andelman	Scene from Tini: The Movie
"Losing the Love"	2016	Phil Andelman	Features scenes from Tini: The Movie
"Great Escape"	2016	Phil Andelman	Features guest appearance by Spanish model Pepe Barroso Silva
"Yo Me Escaparé" (Lyric video)	2016	Eric Hurley	Spanish version of "Great Escape"
"Yo Me Escaparé" (Dance video)	2016	—N/a	Released on Stoessel's official YouTube channel
"Got Me Started"	2016	Fatima Robinson	Excerpts of the video were used in the teaser of Stoessel's Got Me Started Tour before its official premiere
"Ya No Hay Nadie Que Nos Pare" (featuring Sebastián Yatra)	2017	Fatima Robinson	Spanish version of "Got Me Started"
"Finders Keepers" (Dance video)	2017	—N/a	Released on Stoessel's official YouTube channel
"Si Tú Te Vas"	2017	Joaquin Combre	Excerpts of the video were previously used in the backdrop video for the song's performance during the Got Me Started Tour
"Todo es Posible" (David Bisbal featuring Tini)	2017	Mediaset España	Features scenes from Tad the Lost Explorer and the Secret of King Midas
"All You Gotta Do" (Live video)	2017	—N/a	Live performance from the Got Me Started Tour show in Berlin; released on Stoessel's official YouTube channel
"Somos el Cambio" (with Odino Faccia)	2017	—N/a	Live performance from the Red Voz por la Paz ceremony; intercut with rehearsal and behind-the-scenes footage
"Ya No Hay Nadie Que Nos Pare"	2017	Jorge Nisco; Martín Saban	Soy Luna season 2, episode 41; solo performance
"Te Quiero Más" (with Nacho)	2017	Cavia & Cornas	
"Te Quiero Más" (Lyric video) (with Nacho)	2017	—N/a	Released on Stoessel's official YouTube channel; features guest appearances by Stoessel's fans, as well as crew members
"Princesa" (with Karol G)	2018	Agus & Santi	
"Consejo de Amor" (featuring Morat)	2018	—N/a	
"La Cintura (Remix)" (Alvaro Soler featuring Flo Rida and Tini)	2018	—N/a	Remixed version of Soler's hit single "La Cintura"
"Quiero Volver" (with Sebastián Yatra)	2018	David Bohorquez & Diego Peskins	
"Lo Malo (Remix)" (Aitana and Ana Guerra featuring Greeicy and Tini)	2018	—N/a	Remixed version of Aitana and Ana Guerra's single "Lo Malo"
"Por Que Te Vas" (with Cali y El Dandee)	2018	—N/a	Features guest appearances by actors Celeste Cid and Juan Minujín
"Flores" (Live video)	2019	—N/a	Live performance from the Quiero Volver Tour show in Buenos Aires
"Wild" (Jonas Blue featuring Chelcee Grimes, Tini and Jhay Cortez)	2019	—N/a	
"Cristina" (performed by Sebastián Yatra)	2019	Joaquín Cambre; Nuno Gomes	Stoessel guest stars in the video as the title character and sings the first lines of the song in the end; the video features footage from the Quiero Volver Tour
"22" (with Greeicy)	2019	—N/a	Features guest appearances by footballer Sergio Agüero and musician Pablo Lescano
"Sad Song" (Lyric video) (Alesso featuring Tini)	2019	—N/a	
"Sad Song" (Alesso featuring Tini)	2019	Rudy Mancuso	
"Suéltate el Pelo"	2019	Nuno Gomes	Features guest appearances by actress Camila Sodi and model Luna Loaiza
"Fresa" (with Lalo Ebratt)	2019	Daniel Durán	
"Oye" (with Sebastián Yatra)	2019	Daniel Durán	Sequel to the "Cristina" video
"Diciembre" (Live video)	2019	—N/a	Live performance from the Quiero Volver Tour show in Buenos Aires
"Recuerdo" (with Mau y Ricky)	2020	David Bohórquez	
"Ya No Me Llames" (with Ovy on the Drums)	2020	Diego Peskins; Facu Ballve	
"Bésame (I Need You)" (with R3HAB and Reik)	2020	Diego Peskins	
"Ella Dice" (with Khea)	2020	Diego Peskins; Nuno Gomes	
"High (Remix)" (with María Becerra and Lola Índigo)	2020	Julián Levy	Remixed version of María Becerra's single "High"
"Duele" (featuring John C)	2020	Eduardo Casanova	
"Un Beso en Madrid" (with Alejandro Sanz)	2020	Nuno	
"Te Olvidaré"	2020	Tini; Diego Peskins	Stoessel's directorial debut
"Playa" (Lyric video)	2020	—N/a	
"Tuyo" (Lyric video)	2020	—N/a	
"Miénteme" (with María Becerra)	2021	Diego Peskins	Features guest appearance by actor Juan Sorini
"2:50 (Remix)" (with MYA and Duki)	2021	Martin Siepel	Remixed version of MYA's single "2:50"
"La Niña de la Escuela" (with Lola Índigo and Belinda)	2021	—N/a	
"Maldita Foto" (with Manuel Turizo)	2021	Nuno	
"Tú No Me Conoces" (with Danny Ocean)	2021	Diego Peskins	
"Bar" (with L-Gante)	2021	Diego Peskins	
"Aquí Estoy"	2021	—N/a	Features guest appearances by the winners of the Aquí Estoy Challenge
"Fantasi" (with Beéle)	2022	Diego Peskins	
"La Triple T"	2022	Diego Peskins	Drag queens featured in the video are dressed in outfits referencing Stoessel's looks from her previous music videos and live performances
"Carne y Hueso"	2022	Diego Peskins	
"La Loto" (with Becky G and Anitta)	2022	Diego Peskins; Daniel Duran	
"Suéltame" (with Christina Aguilera)	2022	Ana Lily Amirpour	The video was originally set to be released in June, but it was delayed due to a series of shootings in the United States at the time
"El Último Beso" (with Tiago PZK)	2022	Diego Peskins	
"Muñecas" (with La Joaqui and Steve Aoki)	2023	Diego Peskins	
"Por el Resto de Tu Vida" (with Christian Nodal)	2023	Facundo Ballve	
"Cupido"	2023	Diego Peskins	
"La Loto" (Alternative video) (with Becky G and Anitta)	2023	—N/a	Alternative version of the "La Loto" music video
"Me Enteré" (with Tiago PZK)	2023	Laura Vifer	
"Las Jordans"	2023	—N/a	Features guest appearance by footballer Rodrigo De Paul
"Lágrimas" (with Big One and BM)	2023	Lemuel Righi	
"La Original" (with Emilia)	2023	Francisco Ballve	
"Pa"	2024	Bàrbara Farré	Features guest appearance by Stoessel's father Alejandro Stoessel
"Posta"	2024	Bàrbara Farré	
"Buenos Aires"	2024	Bàrbara Farré	
"We Pray (Little Simz Version)" (Coldplay featuring Little Simz, Burna Boy, Elyanna and Tini)	2024	James Zwadlo	
"We Pray (Tini Version)" (Coldplay featuring Little Simz, Burna Boy, Elyanna and Tini)	2024	—N/a	
"We Pray (Elyanna Version)" (Coldplay featuring Little Simz, Burna Boy, Elyanna and Tini)	2024	—N/a	Live performance by the artists during the Music of the Spheres World Tour first show at Dublin's Croke Park
"El Cielo"	2024	Malu Boruchowicz	
"Lo Que Me Causa" (with Milo J)	2025	Poul Nissen	Includes footage of the artists' performance at Madrid's Movistar Arena
"Blackout" (with Emilia and Nicki Nicole)	2025	Lea Esmaili	
"Me Gusta" (with Miranda!)	2025	Melanie Antón Defelippis; Bruno Adamovsky; Nicolás Sedano	
"Strangers" (JP Saxe featuring Tini)	2025	Diego Tucci & Richard Mountainous	
"Universidad" (with Beéle)	2025	Martín Rietti	
"Universidad" (Lyric video) (with Beéle)	2025	—N/a	Includes footage of the music video, as well as uncut scenes and photos from the set
"De Papel"	2025	AMPM; Mateo Caride	
"De Papel" (Lyric video)	2025	—N/a	Includes footage of the music video, as well as uncut scenes
"Hasta Que Me Enamoro" (with María Becerra)	2025	Diego Peskins	
"Una Noche Más"	2025	Martín Rietti	Features guest appearance by Chilean actor and Breakdown co-star Jorge López
"Una Noche Más" (Lyric video)	2025	—N/a	Includes footage of the music video, as well as uncut scenes
"Down"	2025	Martín Rietti & Luca Dobry	
"Down" (Lyric video)	2025	—N/a	Includes footage of the music video, as well as uncut scenes
"36 Vidas" (Lyric video)	2025	—N/a	
"Dos Amantes" (with Ulises Bueno)	2026	Martín Seipel	Features guest appearances by Rodrigo De Paul, Lionel Messi, Susana Giménez, Beto Montenegro and Rubén Deicas
"Vuelve" (with Ricky Martin and Los Ángeles Azules)	2026	Andres Ibañez Diaz Infante	
"Pa' Él" (with Los Ángeles Azules)	2026	—N/a	

== Footnotes ==
Notes for peak chart positions
