= List of Billboard Regional Mexican Albums number ones of 2018 =

The Regional Mexican Albums, published in Billboard magazine, is a record chart that features Latin music sales information for regional styles of Mexican music. This data are compiled by Nielsen SoundScan from a sample that includes music stores, music departments at department stores, verifiable sales from concert venues and track equivalent album units and streaming equivalent album units in the United States.

== Chart history ==
Key
†	Indicates best performing regional mexican album of 2018

Issue date	Album	Artist(s)	Ref.
January 3	El Hijo del Desierto...	El Dasa	
January 6	Me Dejé Llevar †	Christian Nodal	
January 13	Me Dejé Llevar †	Christian Nodal	
January 20	Me Dejé Llevar †	Christian Nodal	
January 27	Me Dejé Llevar †	Christian Nodal	
February 3	Me Dejé Llevar †	Christian Nodal	
February 10	Me Dejé Llevar †	Christian Nodal	
February 17	Me Dejé Llevar †	Christian Nodal	
February 24	Me Dejé Llevar †	Christian Nodal	
March 3	Me Dejé Llevar †	Christian Nodal	
March 10	Me Dejé Llevar †	Christian Nodal	
March 17	Me Dejé Llevar †	Christian Nodal	
March 24	Me Dejé Llevar †	Christian Nodal	
March 31	Entre Botellas	Chiquis Rivera	
April 7	Me Dejé Llevar †	Christian Nodal	
April 14	Me Dejé Llevar †	Christian Nodal	
April 21	Me Dejé Llevar †	Christian Nodal	
April 28	Me Dejé Llevar †	Christian Nodal	
May 5	Pura Lumbre	Legado 7	
May 12	Comeré Callado, Vol. 2: Con Banda	Gerardo Ortiz	
May 19	Me Dejé Llevar †	Christian Nodal	
May 26	Me Dejé Llevar †	Christian Nodal	
June 2	Me Dejé Llevar †	Christian Nodal	
June 9	Me Dejé Llevar †	Christian Nodal	
June 16	Me Dejé Llevar †	Christian Nodal	
June 23	Me Dejé Llevar †	Christian Nodal	
June 30	Me Dejé Llevar †	Christian Nodal	
July 7	Me Dejé Llevar †	Christian Nodal	
July 14	Me Dejé Llevar †	Christian Nodal	
July 21	Me Dejé Llevar †	Christian Nodal	
July 28	Me Dejé Llevar †	Christian Nodal	
August 4	Mitad y Mitad	Calibre 50	
August 11	Me Dejé Llevar †	Christian Nodal	
August 18	Me Dejé Llevar †	Christian Nodal	
August 25	Me Dejé Llevar †	Christian Nodal	
September 1	Me Dejé Llevar †	Christian Nodal	
September 8	Me Dejé Llevar †	Christian Nodal	
September 15	Me Dejé Llevar †	Christian Nodal	
September 22	Me Dejé Llevar †	Christian Nodal	
September 29	Con Todas Las Fuerzas	Banda MS	
October 6	Con Todas Las Fuerzas	Banda MS	
October 13	Con Todas Las Fuerzas	Banda MS	
October 20	Me Dejé Llevar †	Christian Nodal	
October 27	Me Dejé Llevar †	Christian Nodal	
November 3	Me Dejé Llevar †	Christian Nodal	
November 10	Me Dejé Llevar †	Christian Nodal	
November 17	Me Dejé Llevar †	Christian Nodal	
November 24	Me Dejé Llevar †	Christian Nodal	
December 1	The Green Trip	T3r Elemento	
December 8	The Green Trip	T3r Elemento	
December 15	The Green Trip	T3r Elemento	
December 22	The Green Trip	T3r Elemento	
December 29	Me Dejé Llevar †	Christian Nodal	
