= List of Billboard Regional Mexican Albums number ones of 2019 =

The Regional Mexican Albums, published in Billboard magazine, is a record chart that features Latin music sales information for regional styles of Mexican music. This data are compiled by Nielsen SoundScan from a sample that includes music stores, music departments at department stores, verifiable sales from concert venues and track equivalent album units and streaming equivalent album units in the United States.

== Chart history ==
Issue date	Album	Artist(s)	Ref.
January 5	Me Dejé Llevar	Christian Nodal	
January 12	Me Dejé Llevar	Christian Nodal	
January 19	Me Dejé Llevar	Christian Nodal	
January 26	Me Dejé Llevar	Christian Nodal	
February 2	Me Dejé Llevar	Christian Nodal	
February 9	Me Dejé Llevar	Christian Nodal	
February 16	Me Dejé Llevar	Christian Nodal	
February 23	Me Dejé Llevar	Christian Nodal	
March 2	Me Dejé Llevar	Christian Nodal	
March 9	Me Dejé Llevar	Christian Nodal	
March 16	Me Dejé Llevar	Christian Nodal	
March 23	Me Dejé Llevar	Christian Nodal	
March 30	Me Dejé Llevar	Christian Nodal	
April 6	Me Dejé Llevar	Christian Nodal	
April 13	Me Dejé Llevar	Christian Nodal	
April 20	Me Dejé Llevar	Christian Nodal	
April 27	Me Dejé Llevar	Christian Nodal	
May 4	Me Dejé Llevar	Christian Nodal	
May 11	Me Dejé Llevar	Christian Nodal	
May 18	Me Dejé Llevar	Christian Nodal	
May 25	Ahora	Christian Nodal	
June 1	Ahora	Christian Nodal	
June 8	Ahora	Christian Nodal	
June 15	Pa Las Vibras	Herencia de Patrones	
June 22	Pa Las Vibras	Herencia de Patrones	
June 29	Pa Las Vibras	Herencia de Patrones	
July 6	Pa Las Vibras	Herencia de Patrones	
July 13	Del Barrio Hasta Aqui	Fuerza Regida	
July 20	Del Barrio Hasta Aqui	Fuerza Regida	
July 27	Del Barrio Hasta Aqui	Fuerza Regida	
August 3	Del Barrio Hasta Aqui	Fuerza Regida	
August 10	Del Barrio Hasta Aqui	Fuerza Regida	
August 17	Del Barrio Hasta Aqui	Fuerza Regida	
August 24	Del Barrio Hasta Aqui	Fuerza Regida	
August 31	Del Barrio Hasta Aqui	Fuerza Regida	
September 7	Del Barrio Hasta Aqui	Fuerza Regida	
September 14	Del Barrio Hasta Aqui	Fuerza Regida	
September 21	Del Barrio Hasta Aqui	Fuerza Regida	
September 28	Del Barrio Hasta Aqui	Fuerza Regida	
October 5	Del Barrio Hasta Aqui	Fuerza Regida	
October 12	Del Barrio Hasta Aqui	Fuerza Regida	
October 19	Del Barrio Hasta Aqui	Fuerza Regida	
October 26	Del Barrio Hasta Aqui	Fuerza Regida	
November 2	Del Barrio Hasta Aqui	Fuerza Regida	
November 9	Del Barrio Hasta Aqui	Fuerza Regida	
November 16	Corridos Tumbados	Natanael Cano	
November 23	Corridos Tumbados	Natanael Cano	
November 30	Corridos Tumbados	Natanael Cano	
December 7	Corridos Tumbados	Natanael Cano	
December 14	Corridos Tumbados	Natanael Cano	
December 21	Corridos Tumbados	Natanael Cano	
December 28	Corridos Tumbados	Natanael Cano	
