= List of number-one Billboard Regional Mexican Songs of 2018 =

The Billboard Regional Mexican Songs chart ranks the best-performing Regional Mexican singles in the United States. Published weekly by Billboard magazine, it ranks the "most popular regional Mexican songs, ranked by radio airplay audience impressions as measured by Nielsen Music."

== Chart history ==
Key
†	Indicates best-performing song of 2018

Issue date	Song	Artist(s)	Ref.
January 3	"Cómo no adorarla"	Banda Carnaval	
January 6	"Cómo no adorarla"	Banda Carnaval	
January 13	"Entre beso y beso"	La Arrolladora Banda El Limón de René Camacho	
January 20	"Entre beso y beso"	La Arrolladora Banda El Limón de René Camacho	
January 27	"Entre beso y beso"	La Arrolladora Banda El Limón de René Camacho	
February 3	"Entre beso y beso"	La Arrolladora Banda El Limón de René Camacho	
February 10	"Entre beso y beso"	La Arrolladora Banda El Limón de René Camacho	
February 17	"Entre beso y beso"	La Arrolladora Banda El Limón de René Camacho	
February 24	"Entre beso y beso"	La Arrolladora Banda El Limón de René Camacho	
March 3	"Entre beso y beso"	La Arrolladora Banda El Limón de René Camacho	
March 10	"Me dejé llevar"	Christian Nodal	
March 17	"Me dejé llevar"	Christian Nodal	
March 24	"El problema"	Alfredo Olivas	
March 31	"Esta es tu canción"	La Adictiva Banda San José de Mesillas	
April 7	"¿Cómo vuelvo a enamorarte?"	Regulo Caro	
April 14	"Tiempo"	Banda Los Recoditos	
April 21	"Mitad y mitad"	Calibre 50	
April 28	"Tiempo"	Banda Los Recoditos	
May 5	"Oye Mujer" †	Raymix	
May 12	"Oye Mujer" †	Raymix	
May 19	"Oye Mujer" †	Raymix	
May 26	"Oye Mujer" †	Raymix	
June 2	"Oye Mujer" †	Raymix	
June 9	"Tiempo"	Banda Los Recoditos	
June 16	"Tiempo"	Banda Los Recoditos	
June 23	"Tiempo"	Banda Los Recoditos	
June 30	"Qué bonito es querer"	Ulises Chaidez y sus Plebes	
July 7	"Qué bonito es querer"	Ulises Chaidez y sus Plebes	
July 14	"Qué bonito es querer"	Ulises Chaidez y sus Plebes	
July 21	"Qué bonito es querer"	Ulises Chaidez y sus Plebes	
July 28	"Qué bonito es querer"	Ulises Chaidez y sus Plebes	
August 4	"Qué bonito es querer"	Ulises Chaidez y sus Plebes	
August 11	"Te fallé"	Christian Nodal	
August 18	"Te fallé"	Christian Nodal	
August 25	"En peligro de extinción"	La Adictiva Banda San José de Mesillas	
September 1	"Mi sorpresa fuiste tú"	Calibre 50	
September 8	"Mi sorpresa fuiste tú"	Calibre 50	
September 15	"Mi sorpresa fuiste tú"	Calibre 50	
September 22	"Egoísta"	Gerardo Ortiz	
September 29	"Mi sorpresa fuiste tú"	Calibre 50	
October 6	"Mejor me alejo"	Banda Sinaloense MS de Sergio Lizárraga	
October 13	"Mi sorpresa fuiste tú"	Calibre 50	
October 19	"Mejor me alejo"	Banda Sinaloense MS de Sergio Lizárraga	
October 26	"Mejor me alejo"	Banda Sinaloense MS de Sergio Lizárraga	
November 3	"Mejor me alejo"	Banda Sinaloense MS de Sergio Lizárraga	
November 10	"Mejor me alejo"	Banda Sinaloense MS de Sergio Lizárraga	
November 17	"Mejor me alejo"	Banda Sinaloense MS de Sergio Lizárraga	
November 24	"Mejor me alejo"	Banda Sinaloense MS de Sergio Lizárraga	
December 1	"Mejor me alejo"	Banda Sinaloense MS de Sergio Lizárraga	
December 8	"Mejor me alejo"	Banda Sinaloense MS de Sergio Lizárraga	
December 15	"Mejor me alejo"	Banda Sinaloense MS de Sergio Lizárraga	
December 22	"No te contaron mal"	Christian Nodal	
December 29	"No te contaron mal"	Christian Nodal	
