= Forajido =

EP by Christian Nodal
- Released: May 27, 2022
- Genre: Mariachi; norteño
- Length: 17:28
- Language: Spanish
- Label: Sony Latin
- Producer: Jaime González

Christian Nodal chronology
| Recordando A Una Leyenda (2021) | Forajido (2022) | Forajido 2 (2023) |

Singles from Forajido
- 1. "La Sinvergüenza" Released: September 23, 2021; 2. "Ya No Somos Ni Seremos" Released: February 18, 2022; 3. "Vivo en el 6" Released: May 6, 2022

Forajido, also titled Forajido EP1 is the second extended play by Mexican musician, singer and songwriter Christian Nodal, released on May 27, 2022, through Sony Music Latin. It was produced by Jaime González and features a collaboration with Banda MS de Sergio Lizárraga. The EP, spawned three singles: "La Sinvergüenza", "Ya No Somos Ni Seremos" and "Vivo en el 6".

The EP debuted at number 28 on the US Billboard Top Latin Albums and number 2 on the Regional Mexican Albums charts with 3,000 album-equivalent units. It was certified platinum in the United States. The first two singles were also certified platinum in the country while the latter was certified gold.

At the 23rd Annual Latin Grammy Awards, it won Best Ranchero/Mariachi Album (Nodal's second win in the category) while the single "Vivo en el 6" was nominated for Best Regional Mexican Song. The EP was also nominated for Best Regional Mexican Music Album (including Tejano) at the 65th Annual Grammy Awards, being his third Grammy Award nomination.

== Background ==
Following the release of Recordando a Una Leyenda (2021), a collaborative album with Los Plebes del Rancho de Ariel Camacho, Nodal sued his then record label Fonovisa for breach of contract, ultimately ending his contract with the label; he had previously released all of his albums through said label. The same year he signed with Sony Music Latin, with Forajido being his first project with the label as well as his second extended play overall after Lo Más Nuevo (2018), which consisted in versions of songs from his debut album Me Dejé Llevar (2017).

Forajido was produced by Nodal's frequent collaborator Jaime González as well as songwriting from Edgar Barrera, Elena Rose, Edén Muñoz, Horacio Placencia, Andrés Acosta and Santiago Munera. About the project, Nodal said "these songs are made with all my love for my fans around the world that have made me the musician I am today. Every single one of the songs has a message that you can dedicate to whoever you like".

== Promotion ==
On September 23, 2021, "La Sinvergüenza" featuring Banda MS was released as the first single from Forajido. The second single, "Ya No Somos Ni Seremos", was released on February 18, 2022. The single became Nodal's fifth top-ten entry on the Hot Latin Songs in the United States, and his fourth and highest-peaking entry on the Bubbling Under Hot 100 chart, peaking at number three. The third and final single, "Vivo en el 6", was released on May 16, 2022, two weeks before the release of Forajido. Both "La Sinvergüenza" and "Vivo en el 6" topped the Regional Mexican Songs chart, being Nodal's thirteenth and fourteenth number-one songs on the chart respectively.

In the United States, "La Sinvergüenza" and "Ya No Somos Ni Seremos" were certified platinum by the Recording Industry Association of America, with the latter being certified seven times platinum with over 400,000 certification units. The tracks "Vivo en el 6", "Aguardiente" and "Limón con Sal" were additionally certified gold. In Mexico, "La Sinvergüenza" and "Ya No Somos Ni Seremos" were certified platinum and diamond by AMPROFON respectively. The latter became Nodal's first song as a solo act to be certified diamond since his debut single "Adiós Amor" in 2018. In promotion of the EP, Nodal began the Forajido Tour in 2022. Spanning 22 shows, the tour grossed about $14.5 million USD.

== Track listing ==
All tracks were produced by Jaime González.

Forajido track listing
| No. | Title | Writer(s) | Length |
|---|---|---|---|
| 1. | "La Sirvengüenza" (featuring Banda MS de Sergio Lizárraga) | Christian Nodal; Edgar Barrera; Elena Rose; Horacio Palencia | 3:18 |
| 2. | "Ya No Somos Ni Seremos" | Nodal; Barrera | 3:05 |
| 3. | "Vivo en el 6" | Nodal; Barrera; Edén Muñoz | 3:12 |
| 4. | "Limón con Sal" | Nodal; Barrera; Rose | 2:54 |
| 5. | "Aguardiente" | Nodal; Barrera; Andrés Acosta; Santiago Munera | 2:22 |
| 6. | "El Karma" | Nodal; Barrera; Rose | 2:34 |
| Total length: | | | 17:28 |

== Charts ==
Weekly chart performance for Forajido
| Chart (2022) | Peak position |
|---|---|
| US Top Latin Albums (Billboard) | 28 |
| US Regional Mexican Albums (Billboard) | 6 |

== Certifications ==
Certifications for Forajido
| Region | Certification | Certified units/sales |
|---|---|---|
| Mexico (AMPROFON) | 3× Platinum | 420,000^{‡} |
| United States (RIAA) | Platinum (Latin) | 60,000^{‡} |
^{‡} Sales+streaming figures based on certification alone.
