= Buenos Aires (Tini song) =

2024 single by Tini

Single by Tini

from the album Un Mechón de Pelo
- Language: Spanish
- Released: 9 April 2024
- Length: 3:23
- Label: 5020; Sony Latin; Hollywood
- Songwriters: Martina Stoessel; Andrés Torres; Mauricio Rengifo
- Producers: Andrés Torres; Mauricio Rengifo

Tini singles chronology
"Posta" (2024)	"Buenos Aires" (2024)	"Agua" (2024)

Music video
- "Buenos Aires" on YouTube

"Buenos Aires" is a song by Argentine singer Tini and the sixth track of her fifth studio album, Un Mechón de Pelo (2024). She wrote the song along with its producers Andrés Torres and Mauricio Rengifo. It was released on 9 April 2024 as the third single from the album through 5020 Records, Sony Music Latin and Hollywood Records. An accompanying music video was released simultaneously.

== Background ==
In March 2024, Tini blanked out her social media accounts and removed her profile picture hinting at an announcement. On 26 March, she announced her fifth full-length album, Un Mechón de Pelo, while revealing its title and release date, 11 April 2024. On the following day, she shared the cover artwork of the album and its track listing, in which "Buenos Aires" appears as the sixth song. On 31 March, the artist confirmed the release of "Pa", the opening track dedicated to her father, as the lead single from the record. "Posta" followed as the second single on 4 April, a song with lyrics about the criticism she has received for her appearance and her private life.

On 8 April, a countdown of the official video for "Buenos Aires" was launched on Tini's YouTube channel. She later confirmed the release of the song as the third single on social media. In a statement about "Buenos Aires", while she thanked her fans for the support she received with the previous songs, Tini confirmed that it was one of her favorites on the album, but one of the ones that hurt her the most to verbalize. The song was promoted with a fragment of the video clip in which a man is heard saying: "Calm down, my love. Give yourself time," while caressing her.

== Composition ==
"Buenos Aires" was labeled by Infobae as a "melancholic ballad". According to TN, on the song, Tini "opens her heart and shows her most vulnerable side, referring to the complex stages of depression she went through" with connections to her breakup with Argentine footballer Rodrigo De Paul. The lyrics of the song, in which she brings up her psychological problems, including fears, crisis and heartbreak, are "on the surface"; it expresses: "Closing and opening wounds / That's what life is about / That love exists after love / Even though it hurts you". "Today Buenos Aires hurts," says Tini in the song, after she "always referred to how much she loves the city and how good it made her to be in it", after months of touring with Argentine telenovela Violetta or in her solo career.

== Critical reception ==
El Canal de la Musica for Crónica TV claimed that on the song, Tini "continues to demonstrate her versatility and talent as an artist, conquering hearts [...] and leaving an indelible mark in the music industry".

== Music video ==
A music video for "Buenos Aires" was released in parallel to the song. It features her dressed in a hoodie and a cap, looking at the city, Buenos Aires, from a dome. Below, the singer appears in a more confident attitude. It sees a comparison between Tini and Martina (her birth name), as the "person behind her", following the concept of her previous video, for the song "Posta", released five days earlier.

== Charts ==
Chart performance for "Buenos Aires"
Chart (2024)	Peak position
Argentina (Argentina Hot 100)	8
Argentina Airplay (Monitor Latino)	3
Uruguay (Monitor Latino)	13
