= Te Fallé =

2017 song by Christian Nodal

"Te fallé"

Single by Christian Nodal

from the album Me Dejé Llevar
- Released: June 30, 2017
- Genre: Mariachi bolero
- Length: 3:51
- Label: Universal Latin; Fonovisa
- Songwriter: Christian Nodal

Christian Nodal singles chronology
| "Me Dejé Llevar" (2017) | "Te fallé" (2017) | "No Te Contaron Mal" (2018) |

"Te Fallé" (transl. "I Failed You") is a song by Mexican singer-songwriter Christian Nodal. Written by Nodal and produced by Jaime González, it was released on June 30, 2017 as the final single from Nodal's debut studio album, Me Dejé Llevar (2017).

The song was a commercial success in Mexico and the United States, peaking at number two on the Monitor Latino Top 20 General Mexican Songs chart and number 24 on the Hot Latin Songs chart Billboard's Regional Mexican Airplay chart in the United States.

== Music video ==
The music video for the song was directed by Fernando Lugo. It has over 103 million views as of July 2018.

== Charts ==
=== Weekly charts ===
| Chart | Peak position |
|---|---|
| Mexico Top 20 General (Monitor Latino) | 1 |
| Mexico Top 20 Popular (Monitor Latino) | 1 |
| US Hot Latin Songs (Billboard) | 24 |
| US Latin Airplay (Billboard) | 10 |
| US Regional Mexican Airplay (Billboard) | 1 |

=== Year-end charts ===
| Chart (2018) | Position |
|---|---|
| Mexico (Monitor Latino) | 16 |
| US Hot Latin Songs (Billboard) | 74 |

== Certifications ==
| Region | Certification | Certified units/sales |
|---|---|---|
| Mexico (AMPROFON) | Gold | 30,000^{‡} |
| United States (RIAA) | 2× Platinum (Latin) | 120,000^{‡} |
^{‡} Sales+streaming figures based on certification alone.

== Release history ==
| Region | Date | Format | Label |
|---|---|---|---|
| Worldwide | June 30, 2017 | Digital download; streaming | Universal Latin; Fonovisa |

== See also ==
- List of number-one songs of 2018 (Mexico)
- List of number-one Billboard Regional Mexican Songs of 2018
