= Ya No Somos Ni Seremos =

2022 single by Christian Nodal

Single by Christian Nodal

from the EP Forajido
- Language: Spanish
- Released: February 18, 2022
- Genre: Mariachi; norteño
- Label: Sony Latin
- Songwriters: Christian Nodal; Édgar Barrera; Anthony López
- Producer: Jesus Jaime Gonzales Terrazas

Christian Nodal singles chronology
"Te Marqué Pedo (Remix)" (2022)	"Ya No Somos Ni Seremos" (2022)	"Te Lloré un Rio" (2022)

"Ya No Somos Ni Seremos" (English: "Now We Aren't or Will Ever Be") is a song by Mexican musician Christian Nodal. Written by Nodal, Anthony López and Édgar Barrera, it was released on February 18, 2022 via Sony Music Latin as the second single from Nodal's second extended play, Forajido (2022). The track peaked at number one on the Hits of the World Mexico Songs chart and debuted at number eight on the Hot Latin Songs chart.

== Background ==
Following the release of his third studio album, Ayayay! (2020), Christian Nodal and his parents were sued by his then-record label, Universal Music Latin Entertainment for accounts of fraud. He later announced on social media that he was dropping Universal Music Latin as his record label, stating, "Many fans are worried with what's happening with me and my career these past few days... I don't have a contract with Universal. Universal didn't want me to leave but I've given them five years of my work and I did what I was supposed to do. I worked hard giving my 100%". Nodal thereafter signed to Sony Music Latin, with "Ya No Somos Ni Seremos" being his first release via the label.

== Reception ==
The song received mainly positive reception upon release. Griselda Flores of Billboard described Nodal's performance as "sorrowing over his heartbreak", stating, "penned by Nodal and his go-to songwriter Anthony López and Edgar Barrera finds the 23-year-old artist narrating the ultimate end of a love story. 'I wanted to cover my face with tattoos to cover up the kisses you left behind,' he sings with pathos." El Universal referred to the track as "[something] that many fans of Nodal assure fits like a glove".

The song was nominated for three awards; it was nominated for both Best Regional Mexican Song at the 2022 Premios Juventud, and was nominated for Regional Mexican Song of the Year and for Mariachi/Ranchera Song of the Year at the Premio Lo Nuestro 2023, with it winning the latter.

== Commercial performance ==
The song was a commercial success, entering the Hits of the World charts in multiple Latin American countries and becoming Nodal's first, and currently only, number-one entry on the Billboard Mexico Songs chart. It debuted at number four on the Latin Digital Song Sales chart after receiving about 1,000 streaming downloads upon release. The song also notably became Nodal's highest debuting single on the Billboard Hot Latin Songs chart as a solo act, peaking at number eight. It also became Nodal's fourth entry on the Bubbling Under Hot 100 chart, peaking at number three.

== Accolades ==
Award	Year	Category	Result	Ref.
Premios Juventud	2022	Best Regional Mexican Song	Nominated	
Premio Lo Nuestro	2023	Regional Mexican Song of the Year	Nominated	
Premio Lo Nuestro	2023	Mariachi/Ranchera Song of the Year	Won	

== Charts ==
=== Weekly charts ===
Chart (2022)	Peak position
Bolivia Songs (Billboard)	6
Colombia Songs (Billboard)	20
Ecuador Songs (Billboard)	25
Global 200 (Billboard)	36
Mexico Songs (Billboard)	1
US Bubbling Under Hot 100 (Billboard)	3
US Hot Latin Songs (Billboard)	8

=== Year-end charts ===
Chart (2022)	Peak position
US Hot Latin Songs (Billboard)	49

== Certifications ==
Region	Certification	Certified units/sales
Mexico (AMPROFON)	2× Diamond+4× Platinum	1,960,000^{‡}
United States (RIAA)	7× Platinum (Latin)	420,000^{‡}
^{‡} Sales+streaming figures based on certification alone.
