= Por el Resto de Tu Vida =

2023 single by Christian Nodal and Tini

Single by Christian Nodal and Tini

from the EP Forajido 2
- Language: Spanish
- Released: January 26, 2023
- Genre: Latin pop; bolero; Latin trap
- Length: 3:17
- Label: Sony Music Latin
- Songwriters: Christian Nodal; Édgar Barrera; Elena Rose
- Producers: Christian Nodal; Jaime González; Lucas Otero

Christian Nodal singles chronology
"La Siguiente" (2022)	"Por el Resto de Tu Vida" (2023)	"Un Cumbión Dolido" (2023)

Tini singles chronology
"Muñecas" (2023)	"Por el Resto de Tu Vida" (2023)	"Cupido" (2023)

Music video
- "Por el Resto de Tu Vida" on YouTube

"Por el Resto de Tu Vida" (transl. "For the Rest of Your Life") is a song by Mexican musician and singer-songwriter Christian Nodal, featuring Argentinian singer and songwriter Tini. Written by Nodal, Édgar Barrera and Elena Rose, it was released on January 26, 2023 via Sony Music Latin as the lead single from Nodal's second extended play, Forajido 2 (2023).

== Background and promotion ==
In August 2021, Christian Nodal began a relationship with Spanish-Mexican singer Belinda, whom he had previously met on the program La Voz México. During this period of time, Nodal co-wrote the song "Por el Resto de Tu Vida" with Édgar Barrera and Elena Rose in dedication to Belinda, though it ended up not being officially released; the two would later separate in February 2022.

In July 2022, Christian Nodal announced a sequel to his extended play Forajido (2022), sharing snippets of songs from the EP. Speculation arose that "Por el Resto de Tu Vida" would be released with Argentinian rapper Cazzu, Nodal's current partner; Nodal later confirmed that the official release would instead feature Tini. The song was released on January 26, 2023 as the lead single from the EP, though it was originally meant to be released on Valentine's Day. In an interview with ¡Hola!, Nodal stated "It’s a very special song for me, that I composed with Édgar Barrera and Elena Rose, in honor of love".

== Reception ==
The song received mainly positive reception from music critics. Isabela Raygoza of Billboard described Nodal and Tini as a "dazziling duet", further stating, "the mariacheño trailblazer and Argentine pop singer match hearts as their voices collide to make one of the sweetest of love songs of the year so far". Jeanette Hernandez of Remezcla praised the song's composition, stating, "with guitar-forward and light trap-pop elements, the two created a track that properly introduced their diverse audiences to each other". Shirley Gómez of ¡Hola! stated the song "bombard[s] listeners with a potent dose of love, sensuality, and romanticism", and that Tini was "the perfect singer to join him [Nodal] in this musical adventure".

== Accolades ==
Award	Year	Category	Result	Ref.
Premios Juventud	2023	Best Regional Mexican Fusion	Nominated	

== Charts ==
Chart performance for "Por el Resto de Tu Vida"
Chart (2022)	Peak position
Argentina Hot 100 (Billboard)	63
US Latin Pop Airplay (Billboard)	14

== Certifications ==
Certifications for "Por el Resto de Tu Vida"
Region	Certification	Certified units/sales
Mexico (AMPROFON)	3× Platinum+Gold	490,000^{‡}
^{‡} Sales+streaming figures based on certification alone.
