= Probablemente =

2017 single by Christian Nodal

Single by Christian Nodal featuring David Bisbal

from the album Me Dejé Llevar
- Released: June 9, 2017
- Recorded: 2017
- Genre: Mariachi bolero
- Length: 3:53
- Label: Universal Latin; Fonovisa
- Songwriter: Christian Nodal

Christian Nodal singles chronology
"Adiós Amor" (2017)	"Probablemente" (2017)	"Me Dejé Llevar" (2017)

David Bisbal singles chronology
"Fiebre" (2016)	"Probablemente" (2017)	"A Partir de Hoy" (2018)

Music video
- "Probablemente" on YouTube

"Probablemente" (English: "Probably") is a song by Mexican singer Christian Nodal featuring vocals from Spanish singer David Bisbal. The song was released on June 9, 2017, as the third single from his debut album, Me Dejé Llevar. "Probablemente" reached number two on the Monitor Latino Top 20 General Mexican Songs chart and number twenty on the Billboard Top Latin Songs chart in the United States.

== Promotion ==
To promote the release of the song and his album Me Dejé Llevar, Nodal sang "Adiós Amor" and "Probablemente" at the 6th Your World Awards.

== Chart performance ==
In Mexico, "Probablemente" reached number two on the Mexico Top 20 General chart. In the United States, the single entered Billboard's Hot Latin Songs and peaked at number 31, while the song peaked at number 12 on Billboard's Regional Mexican Songs in 2017.

== Charts ==
Chart (2017)	Peak position
Guatemala (Monitor Latino)	20
Mexico Top 20 General (Monitor Latino)	2
US Hot Latin Songs (Billboard)	15
US Latin Airplay (Billboard)	3
US Regional Mexican Airplay (Billboard)	1

=== Year-end charts ===
Chart (2017)	Position
El Salvador (Monitor Latino)	70
Mexico Top 20 General (Monitor Latino)	9
US Hot Latin Songs (Billboard)	36
Chart (2018)	Position
Guatemala (Monitor Latino)	93

== Certifications ==
Region	Certification	Certified units/sales
Mexico (AMPROFON)	Platinum+Gold	90,000^{‡}
United States (RIAA)	5× Platinum (Latin)	300,000^{‡}
^{‡} Sales+streaming figures based on certification alone.

== Release history ==
Region	Date	Format	Label
Worldwide	June 9, 2017	Digital download; streaming	Universal Latin; Fonovisa

== Solo version ==
"Probablemente"

Song by Christian Nodal

from the album Me Dejé Llevar
- Released: June 9, 2017
- Recorded: 2017
- Genre: Ranchera
- Length: 3:53
- Label: Universal Latin; Fonovisa
- Songwriter: Christian Nodal
