= Entre beso y beso =

Single by La Arrolladora Banda El Limón
- Language: Spanish
- English title: "Between Kiss and Kiss"
- Released: October 28, 2017
- Genre: Banda
- Length: 3:01
- Label: Universal Music Group
- Songwriter: Aarón "La Pantera" Martínez
- Producer: Fernando Camacho

"Entre beso y beso" (English: "Between kiss and kiss") is a Banda song recorded by Mexican ensemble La Arrolladora Banda El Limón de René Camacho. Written by Aarón "La Pantera" Martínez and produced by Fernando Camacho, the song was released on October 28, 2017 as the lead single from the eponymous album.

Josi Cuen provides vocals for the song. "Entre beso y beso" is the first single released by La Arrolladora after the departure of their previous lead singer, Jorge Medina, who had been with the ensemble for 20 years. The single topped the Mexican charts, and it also charted in Guatemala and the United States.

== Charts ==
Chart	Peak position
Guatemala Top 20 Regional Mexicano (Monitor Latino)	14
El Salvador Top 20 General (Monitor Latino)	9
Mexico Top 20 General (Monitor Latino)	1
Mexico Top 20 Popular (Monitor Latino)	1
US Hot Latin Songs (Billboard)	24
US Regional Mexican Songs (Billboard)	1

== Release history ==
Region	Date	Format	Label
Worldwide	October 28, 2017	Digital download	Universal Music Group

== See also ==
- List of number-one songs of 2018 (Mexico)
- List of number-one Billboard Regional Mexican Songs of 2018
