= Un Mechón de Pelo =

2024 studio album by Tini

Studio album by Tini
- Released: 11 April 2024
- Recorded: 2023–2024
- Studio: 5020 (Miami); EastWest (Los Angeles); Eagle Pop (Los Angeles)
- Genre: Spoken word; alternative pop
- Length: 28:00
- Language: Spanish
- Label: 5020; Sony Latin; Hollywood
- Producer: Andrés Torres; Mauricio Rengifo; Felipe Contreras; Zecca

Tini chronology
Cupido (2023)	Un Mechón de Pelo (2024)	Un Mechón de Pelo (En Vivo) (2024)

Singles from Un Mechón de Pelo
- 1. "Pa" Released: 1 April 2024; 2. "Posta" Released: 4 April 2024; 3. "Buenos Aires" Released: 9 April 2024

Un Mechón de Pelo (transl. A Lock of Hair) is the fifth studio album by Argentine singer Tini, released on 11 April 2024, by 5020 Records, Sony Music Latin and Hollywood Records. Tini co-wrote all the songs on the album, and its production was mostly handled by her longtime collaborators Andrés Torres and Mauricio Rengifo, along with Felipe Contreras and Zecca. It is her first album to contain no guest features or collaborations.

Tini conceived the album shortly after finishing work on Cupido (2023) and continued developing it during her third concert tour, Tini Tour (2022–2023). Primarily a spoken word and alternative pop record, Un Mechón de Pelo experiments with minimal music, electronica, Latin rock, and Latin R&B; it heavily features elements of storytelling, mainly consisting of uptempo tunes and downtempo ballads. Inspired by her personal struggles, it was described as Tini's most personal record up to that point, with its lyrical content reflecting on vulnerability, pain, resilience, renewal and growth.

Three singles were released from Un Mechón de Pelo. "Pa" was released on 1 April 2024 as the album's lead single, and peaked at number one on the Argentina Hot 100, marking Tini's fifth chart-topper. "Posta" and "Buenos Aires" were released as the second and third singles from the album, respectively; the latter song peaked at number eight in Argentina. Upon its release, Un Mechón de Pelo received generally positive reviews. It was included in Billboard and Rolling Stone's year-end Latin music lists. Tini ventured on a five-show promotional concert series at the Hurlingham Club in Buenos Aires, after the album's release. Two specials recorded at the shows and based on the album were released on Flow, Disney+, and Star+ in May 2024.

== Background ==
Tini's fourth studio album, Cupido, was released on 16 February 2023. The album was a commercial success and was met with a generally positive critical response. The record yielded multiple singles including the Argentina Hot 100 number-ones "Miénteme", "Bar", and "La Triple T". It made Stoessel the first Argentine act since Miguel Caló in 2016 to debut in the top ten of Billboard's Latin Pop Albums chart. Cupido was certified double platinum (Latin) in the United States by the RIAA. Tini embarked on the Tini Tour in support of the album and its predecessor Tini Tini Tini (2020), which included 60 shows across South America, North America, and Europe, from May 2022 to November 2023.

In March 2023, Tini revealed that she was working on new music. Recording sessions began that month with Tini working with longtime producers Andrés Torres and Mauricio Rengifo. In an interview with El Diaro in November 2023, Tini revealed that personal struggles that she had over the past few years had predominantly influenced her new album. She stated that she wanted to "open up" to the public via the album, which she revealed would sonically mark a departure from the sound of her previous music. In February 2024, Tini won the Premio Lo Nuestro award for Urban/Pop Album of the Year for Cupido; in her acceptance speech, she revealed that her next musical project was imminent which she "never imagined" she "would [have dared]" to make.

In anticipation of new music, Tini blanked out her social media on 15 March 2024 and shared a picture of a floor full of strands of cut hair to her Instagram Stories. Over the next few days, she posted images from a photoshoot set against a bathroom backdrop; they depicted the procedure of her hair makeover to blonde. On 23 March, she previewed new music. On 26 March 2024, Tini announced her fifth studio album, titled Un Mechón de Pelo, and its release date via her social media. The announcement was accompanied with a promotional image of her looking into the mirror.

== Composition ==
=== Music and lyrics ===
Un Mechón de Pelo is a spoken word and alternative pop album. It explores a diversity of other music genres, including electronica music, latin pop, latin rock latin R&B, with heavily features elements of storytelling; it is a sonic departure from the urbano and reggaeton-dominated sound of its predecessor Cupido. The album also include uptempo songs and ballads. Rolling Stone stated that the "Un Mechón de Pelo presents a straightforward look at Tini grappling with the complexities of being in the limelight from an early age, dealing with crippling mental health issues, and, by the end, convincing herself that she'll be alright". Griselda Flores from Billboard noted that it is Tini's "most personal project yet", and described it as a concept album whose subject matter details her struggles with mental health, media scrutiny, child stardom, professional disillusionment, and her celebrity.

=== Songs ===
The album begins with its lead singe "Pa", thrilling and emotional ballad, where she shares the fear she felt after nearly losing her father. In the song, she pleads for "un ratito más," or a little while longer with her dad. The next track "Posta" is a electronica song with elements of latin R&B, where she clarifies who she is and isn't. In this track, Tini spoke about her struggles with balancing her artistic persona and her own identity, on which she repeats the assumptions people "have thrown at me for years." The third track "Miedo", begins with choral singing with a lot of echo and, when Tini's voice emerges, with the epistolary format of the song. The theme is a letter in which she reflects on holding on to a memory and not letting it go. The lyrics expose Tini's feelings: "I escaped from my reality, I locked myself in my loneliness." The last verse, capturing the "fear of not finding the words" and of a calm that did not return. The fourth track "Ni de Ti" is the album's standout. It's a scathing track aimed at her detractors. The song evokes chaos with the musical base, and refers to the lies that were invented about it and although, without giving names, about what was her relationship with Rodrigo De Paul, involving Cami Homs. This frenetic tempo contrasts with different audios of her grandmother throughout the song. It also includes an extensive dialogue from the artist. On controversial fifth track "Ángel", she returns to healing that inner child, and interrupts a piano ballad with a rap to share her family's side of the headline-making rupture and legal battle between her father Alejandro Stoessel and famed TV host Marcelo Tinelli over the intellectual property of Disney Channel show Patito Feo, the series Tini got her start in back in 2008. In the song, she claims Tinelli lied about her father and instead of his status helping her get her breakthrough role on Violetta, as many assumed, Disney "didn't even want to hire" her because of it.

The six track of the album "Buenos Aires" is a ballad, backed by acoustic guitar, that has managed to capture the feeling of pain in its music video clip. At the beginning of the video we see Tini looking out the window, with her lost gaze. At her feet, in the city, we see Tini with a new 'look' doing activities with a more confident attitude and, despite being alone down there, she keeps going. Album's eight track "Ellas" was the very first song she released, even if it was a fragment of it. When Tini deleted all of her Instagram posts and ushered in her new album era, her first 'post', in which she made reference to her new project, included the beginning of 'ellas'. It is a short song, but it says a lot. The beginning is a succession of audios of close women, hence the title of the song, supporting the artist in her toughest moments mentally. The song is a token of gratitude for putting yourself in her shoes and understanding the bad mental state she was going through. The album's seventh track "Tinta 90", a reference to her signature hair color, Tini sings about dealing with her mental health in private and how those around her didn't even realize she was suffering. "Only the two of us know what we went through," she sings using female pronouns in Spanish. She stated that "that's me speaking to myself and my brain".

An upbeat ninth album's track "Bien" hears Tini exit a stormy mindset. The song includes the phrase "Un Mechón de Pelo" that appears in the album title. Here Tini shows us her personal improvement and that "not everything has to be fine" and "that it is fine if you are not fine." A lesson of learning and growth that, at marked rhythms, puts an end to that story that began tragically. The tenth track "Me Voy" closes the album and the whole story that Tini wanted to show with the album Un Mechón de Pelo. This theme refers to the key point in which Tini leaves past events behind and "leaves": "I have time to change my destiny and although I am afraid of love, now I feel better." On this track, the singer leaves the old Tini behind. She's no longer letting anyone tell her who she noting: "It used to cause me so much panic to not say some things. Sometimes, to build the courage to speak, you need time. You need to process," she says. "The album explains every point I'm trying to get at… And whoever wants to understand it, will. Whoever doesn't, won't."

== Release and promotion ==
Un Mechón de Pelo was released on 11 April 2024 via 5020 Records and Sony Music Latin. The album was issued via digital download and streaming. It was promoted by digital service providers such as Apple Music, Spotify and YouTube. Following its announcement, a trailer for the album was released to Tini's social media and YouTube channel on 27 March 2024. It features Tini quietly sobbing while she cuts her hair, with a voiceover by her of her thoughts on themes of mental health. The cover artwork and tracklist of the album were unveiled the day after. The same day the album was available for preorder. A series of five concerts was conducted from 27 April to 3 May at Hurlingham Club in Buenos Aires wherein Tini performed music from the album. The third show was filmed and will air on Flow and be released as a concert film on its streaming service on 6 May.

=== Singles ===
"Pa" was released on 1 April 2024 as the lead single from the album. The song's accompanying music video, directed by Bàrbara Farré, features guest appearance by Tini's father Alejandro Stoessel was released on the same day via Tini's Vevo channel on YouTube. "Pa" peaked atop the Argentina Hot 100, marking Tini's fifth number-one single in the country.

"Posta" was released on 4 April 2024 as the second single. The song debuted at number 28 on the Argentina Hot 100.

"Buenos Aires" was released on 9 April 2024, as the third single. It debuted at number 8 on the Argentina Hot 100.

== Critical reception ==
Un Mechón de Pelo received mostly positive reviews from music critics. Thania Garcia from Variety stated that it is "a concept album that touches on topics ranging from mental health to the evolution of her career as an actor and singer-songwriter. [...] Tini opens the pages of her diary to tell a story about resilience and renewal and also serves as a tribute to her love and admiration for her father". Melanie Cordero of Los 40 notes that "In this piece the artist explores the pain, anguish, fear and shock she felt in one of the most difficult moments of her life. Her showing the most vulnerable side of her by allowing her fans to immerse themselves in the introspective path of her art [...] each topic represents a chapter of resilience and evolution. That immerses listeners in a universe of emotions and culminates on their path to peace". Rolling Stone noted that "[The album] is a catharsis, and a far cry from the profit-pulling project some critics made it out to be". Celeste Sawczuk from Infobae stated that the album "is a melodic letter about her own healing process". Diario Río Negro called the album a "perfect project" and added that it's "very well articulated, to usher in a new era, in which [Tini] makes a clean slate, opening the doors to her best version".

Year-end lists
Publication	List	Rank	Ref.
Billboard	The 25 Best Latin Albums of 2024	20	
Rolling Stone	The 100 Best Albums of 2024	12	

== Track listing ==
All tracks' lyrics written by Martina Stoessel and all music is composed by Andrés Torres and Mauricio Rengifo, and produced by the latter two, except where noted.

Un Mechón de Pelo track listing
No.	Title	Lyrics	Music	Producer(s)	Length
1.	"Pa"	Martina Stoessel; Elena Rose	Andrés Torres; Mauricio Rengifo		3:10
2.	"Posta"				2:01
3.	"Miedo"				3:05
4.	"Ni de Ti"				2:34
5.	"Ángel"				3:46
6.	"Buenos Aires"				3:23
7.	"Tinta 90"				2:46
8.	"Ellas"			Torres; Rengifo; Felipe Contreras	1:47
9.	"Bien"				2:52
10.	"Me Voy"	Stoessel; Tiago Uriel Pacheco Lezcano	Francisco Zecca	Zecca	2:20
Total length:					28:00

== Personnel ==
- Martina Stoessel – lead vocals, background vocals
- Andrés Torres – keyboards, guitar, programming, engineering
- Mauricio Rengifo – background vocals, keyboards, programming, engineering
- Tom Norris – mixing
- Lewis Pickett – mixing
- Francisco Zecca – engineering
- Camilo Zeea – engineering

== Charts ==
Weekly chart performance for Un Mechón de Pelo
Chart (2024)	Peak position
Spanish Albums (Promusicae)	14

== Release history ==
Release history and formats for Un Mechón de Pelo
Region	Date	Format(s)	Label	Ref.
Various	11 April 2024	Digital download; streaming	5020; Sony Latin; Hollywood	
