= Posta (song) =

2024 single by Tini

Single by Tini

from the album Un Mechón de Pelo
- Language: Spanish
- Released: 4 April 2024
- Length: 2:01
- Label: 5020; Sony Latin; Hollywood
- Songwriters: Martina Stoessel; Andrés Torres; Mauricio Rengifo
- Producers: Andrés Torres; Mauricio Rengifo

Tini singles chronology
"Pa" (2024)	"Posta" (2024)	"Buenos Aires" (2024)

Music video
- "Posta" on YouTube

"Posta" is a song by Argentine singer Tini and the second track of her fifth studio album, Un Mechón de Pelo (2024). It was released on 4 April 2024, through 5020 Records, Sony Music Latin and Hollywood Records, as the second single from the album. Tini wrote the song with its producers Andrés Torres and Mauricio Rengifo. An accompanying music video was released simultaneously.

== Background ==
In 2023, Tini had given some signs of the song and the album, revealing some parts of its production. In the platform X (formerly Twitter), she shared a part of the song's lyrics in response to a fan.

After blanking out her social media accounts and removing her profile picture, Tini announced her fifth full-length album, Un Mechón de Pelo on 26 March 2024; she revealed its title and release date, 11 April 2024. On 27 March, she shared the cover artwork of the album and its track listing, in which "Posta" appears as the second song. The singer confirmed the release of "Posta" as a single on 3 April 2024, one day before its release. Parallel to the announcement, she stated: "After a long time, when I realized that I had believed many labels and comments about myself, I was already completely drowned. I started to talk about them and recognize them, I didn't want them to be part of my life anymore".

== Composition and theme ==
The self-referential song addresses topics such as the "cost of fame" and the criticism that those who work in the entertainment industry are exposed to, and the criticism she receives through social networks. According to La Voz del Interior newspaper, the singer "invites [the listeners] to reflect on the media pressure and social expectations that surround certain artists".

== Music video ==
A music video for "Posta" was released alongside the song on 4 April 2024. It features a comparison between Tini, the singer, and Martina (her birth name), as the "person behind her". She is seen walking across a bridge, which symbolizes the passage from one stage to another, while spiritually the fact of being able to cross a bridge symbolizes "will and determination to achieve a final goal".

== Charts ==
Chart performance for "Posta"
Chart (2024)	Peak position
Argentina (Argentina Hot 100)	24
