= Forajido 2 =

EP by Christian Nodal
- Released: May 29, 2023
- Genre: Regional Mexican
- Length: 20:57
- Language: Spanish
- Label: Sony Latin
- Producer: Jaime González; Christian Nodal; Lucas Otero

Christian Nodal chronology
Forajido (2022)	Forajido 2 (2023)

Singles from Forajido 2
- 1. "Por el Resto de Tu Vida" Released: January 26, 2023; 2. "Un Cumbión Dolido" Released: February 20, 2023; 3. "Quédate" Released: May 1, 2023

Forajido 2, also titled Forajido EP2 is the third extended play by Mexican musician, singer and songwriter Christian Nodal, released on May 29, 2023, through Sony Music Latin. It was produced by Jaime González, Lucas Otero and Nodal himself, and features a collaboration with Argentine singer Tini.

The EP is a continuation of Nodal's previous EP Forajido, released in 2022. Also a six-song project, Forajido 2 was supported by three singles: "Por el Resto de Tu Vida" with Tini, "Un Cumbión Dolido" and "Quédate", all released through 2023.

== Background ==
Forajido 2, a follow-up to Nodal's 2022 EP Forajido, was first announced in July 2022 by Nodal via his Instagram account, where he shared snippets of songs from the project. Similar to his previous project, the EP consists of six songs, all produced by Nodal himself alongside his manager and frequent collaborator Jaime Gonzalez and Lucas Otero. Additionally, it features songwriting from Edgar Barrera and Elena Rose, who had previously worked in Forajido, and Mexican singer Joss Favela, who wrote the final track "Poquito a Poquito". According to Nodal, the songs are "six different stories that talk about love, heartbreak, spite and illusion". Namely, the opening track "Cazzualidades", is dedicated to Nodal's girlfriend, Argentine rapper Cazzu.

== Promotion ==
=== Singles ===
The EP was supported by three singles. "Por el Resto de Tu Vida", with Argentine singer Tini, was released as the first single on January 26, 2023. Despite not entering the Hot Latin Songs chart, the single peaked at number 14 at the Latin Pop Songs chart, being Nodal's second highest appearance in the chart after "Te Lloré un Río", a collaboration with Mexican band Maná, which peaked at number four. The second single was "Un Cumbión Dolido", released on February 20, 2023. The single topped the Regional Mexican Songs chart, being Nodal's eighteenth number-one song in the chart. The single was certified gold in Mexico in July 2023. The third and final single "Quédate", was released on May 1, 2023.

=== Touring ===
On May 20, 2023, Nodal performed at the Wizink Center in Madrid, Spain. The concert was highly successful, making Nodal the first Regional Mexican artist to fill said venue. Its success led him to announce a tour through Spain in 2024. The same week of the EP's release, on May 26, he performed at the Foro Sol in Mexico City, Mexico.

To promote the EP, Nodal also announced a tour through United States titled Foraji2 Tour, set to begin on August 25, 2023, at Honda Center in Anaheim, California, and end on November 12, at Santander Arena, in Reading, Pennsylvania. Nodal's had toured the country the previous year with the Forajido Tour, which after 22 shows, grossed 14,5 million dollars and sold 147,000 tickets.

== Track listing ==
All tracks were produced by Jaime González, Christian Nodal and Lucas Otero.

Forajido 2 track listing
No.	Title	Writer(s)	Length
1.	"Cazzualidades"	Christian Nodal; Lucas Otero; Chechu Aurrecoechea; Piero	3:08
2.	"Por el Resto de Tu Vida" (with Tini)	Nodal; Edgar Barrera; Elena Rose	3:17
3.	"Quédate"	Nodal	4:07
4.	"Un Cumbión Dolido"	Nodal; Barrera; Johan Arjona; Lucas Otero	3:55
5.	"La Despedida"	Nodal; Barrera; Rose; Johan Arjona	3:30
6.	"Poquito a Poquito"	José Inzunza Favela	3:00
Total length:			20:57

== Charts ==
Weekly chart performance for Forajido 2
Chart (2023)	Peak position
US Top Latin Albums (Billboard)	42
US Regional Mexican Albums (Billboard)	11

== Certifications ==
Certifications for Forajido 2
Region	Certification	Certified units/sales
United States (RIAA)	Platinum (Latin)	60,000^{‡}
^{‡} Sales+streaming figures based on certification alone.
