= Adiós Mi Amor =

Song popularized by Christian Nodal

Single by Los Dareyes de la Sierra
- Released: 2008
- Genre: Banda ballad
- Length: 3:21
- Label: Universal
- Songwriter: Salvador Garza
- Producer: Darey Castro

"Adiós Mi Amor" (transl. "Goodbye My Love") is a song originally composed by Salvador Garza, and it was first recorded and released as a banda ballad by Los Dareyes de la Sierra in 2008. In 2017, Christian Nodal recorded the song with mariachi. In May 2018, Bolivian group Orquesta Internacional Guachambe released a tropical version of the song. Their version had airplay success in their native country. In May 2018, Chilean group Noche de Brujas released a cumbia version cover the song. In September 2018, Peruvian singer Daniela Darcourt released a salsa version cover the song. Her cover reached the number four position in Perú. In October 2018, American duo Ha*Ash recorded a cover version for their Spotify Singles release.

== Christian Nodal version ==
"Adiós Amor"

Single by Christian Nodal

from the album Me Dejé Llevar
- Released: April 14, 2016
- Genre: Mariachi bolero
- Length: 3:22
- Label: Universal Latin; Fonovisa
- Songwriter: Salvador Garza

Christian Nodal singles chronology
"Adiós Amor" (2016)	"Probablemente" (2017)

Mexican singer Christian Nodal released the song, retitled "Adiós Amor", as his debut single. "Adiós Amor" reached number one on the Monitor Latino Top 20 General Mexican Songs chart and number two on the Billboard Top Latin Songs chart in the United States. It also won Regional Mexican Song of the Year at the 2018 Billboard Latin Music Awards.

=== Promotion ===
To promote the release of the song, Mexican singer Julión Álvarez invited Nodal to sing on stage at a sold-out concert in Guadalajara, Mexico in December 2016.

=== Chart performance ===
In the United States, the single entered Billboard's Hot Latin Songs and peaked at number four, while the song peaked at number one on Billboard's Regional Mexican Songs in 2017. The song became the first regional Mexican song to garner a top five spot of the Hot Latin Songs since 2016. In Mexico, the song peaked at number one on the Mexico Top 20 General Monitor Latino chart.

=== Charts ===
==== Weekly charts ====
Chart (2017–18)	Peak position
El Salvador (Monitor Latino)	7
Guatemala (Monitor Latino)	7
Mexico Top 20 General (Monitor Latino)	1
| US Bubbling Under Hot 100 (Billboard)	5
US Hot Latin Songs (Billboard)	4
US Latin Airplay (Billboard)	5
US Regional Mexican Airplay (Billboard)	1

==== Year-end charts ====
Chart (2017)	Position
El Salvador (Monitor Latino)	15
Guatemala (Monitor Latino)	19
Mexico Top 20 General (Monitor Latino)	2
Nicaragua (Monitor Latino)	39
US Hot Latin Songs (Billboard)	9
Chart (2018)	Position
El Salvador (Monitor Latino)	13
Guatemala (Monitor Latino)	28
Chart (2019)	Position
Columbia (Monitor Latino)	65
El Salvador (Monitor Latino)	92

=== Certifications ===
Region	Certification	Certified units/sales
Mexico (AMPROFON)	Diamond+Gold	330,000^{‡}
United States (RIAA)	21× Platinum (Latin)	1,260,000^{‡}
^{‡} Sales+streaming figures based on certification alone.

=== Release history ===
Region	Date	Format	Label
Worldwide	April 14, 2016	Digital download; streaming	Universal Latin; Fonovisa

== See also ==
- List of number-one songs of 2017 (Mexico)
- List of best-selling Latin singles in the United States
