= Pa (song) =

2024 single by Tini

Single by Tini

from the album Un Mechón de Pelo
- Language: Spanish
- Released: 1 April 2024
- Length: 3:10
- Label: 5020; Sony Latin; Hollywood
- Songwriters: Martina Stoessel; Andrés Torres; Mauricio Rengifo; Elena Rose
- Producers: Andrés Torres; Mauricio Rengifo

Tini singles chronology
| "La Original" (2023) | "Pa" (2024) | "Posta" (2024) |

Music video
- "Pa" on YouTube

"Pa" is a song by Argentine singer Tini and the opening track of her fifth studio album, Un Mechón de Pelo (2024). It was released on 1 April 2024, through 5020 Records, Sony Music Latin and Hollywood Records, as the lead single from the album. Tini wrote the song along with Elena Rose and its producers Andrés Torres and Mauricio Rengifo. Lyrically, the song is dedicated to her father, who was in serious health in 2023. "Pa" marked her first solo musical release in over a year, after her fourth album, Cupido (2023).

A Bàrbara Farré-directed music video for "Pa" accompanied its release. The song peaked atop the Argentina Hot 100, published by the Argentinian edition of Billboard, marking Tini's second solo chart topper in the region. It also reached the top 20 in Uruguay and on the airplay chart in her native country, and charted within the top 60 in Spain.

== Background ==
After blanking out her social media accounts and removing her profile picture, on 27 March 2024, Tini announced her fifth studio album, entitled Un Mechón de Pelo, and shared its release date, 11 April 2024. She described it as a personal and introspective album where the singer talks about her mental health and personal struggles. On the following day, she announced the cover artwork and the track listing, in which "Pa" appears as the first track of Un Mechón de Pelo.

The singer also announced that there would be more pre-release singles from the album. On 31 March, she revealed the release date of the song, 1 April, along with a promotional video, while also confirming "Pa" was the lead single from the album. While releasing the song, the singer stated: "It is out, first song on this album, from the depths of my heart".

== Composition ==
"Pa" is a song dedicated to her father, Alejandro Stoessel, who was in serious health in 2023; he had to be transferred to intensive care in serious condition after a complication he had due to a surgery scheduled in 2022 at the La Trinidad Sanatorium in the Buenos Aires neighborhood of Palermo. Tini was focused on accompanying her father and her family at this time which led to postponing her Tini Tour, which was originally planned for March 2022, until the end of May. "Pa" was described as a thrilling and emotional ballad by Los 40 and La Nación, respectively.

== Critical reception ==
Cristina Zavala from Los 40 stated that "there are no metaphorical letters to which we must find the symbology and hidden meaning. On the contrary, she has opted for the most direct simplicity that leaves a record of what she has felt and experienced in a raw and direct way". Writers from Quiero Música said that "it's clear that it was born from a deeply personal experience [...] And that this single is also a testament to Tini's continuous evolution, revealing a new facet of her art and opening the doors of her world to listeners". Infobae described it as "moving and heartbreaking".

== Music video ==
A preview of the music video for "Pa" was shared by Tini on 31 March 2024, while announcing the release of the song as a single. Directed by Bàrbara Farré and produced by Canada, it was released alongside the track. It was filmed in Madrid, and the creative direction was in charge of Terrivle. Upon its release, the music video reached the first position of trends on YouTube in various Latin American countries.

The video is recorded in a hospital waiting room in a false sequence shot, where she sees her life go by accompanied by her father. They are shown from her childhood, professional beginnings and important moments in their life. Meanwhile, she says: "I'm not going to be able to, I'm not going to be able to do the shows, I'm not going to be able to get on stage. Yes, the shows will have to be suspended, thank you". It also contains references to the Argentine telenovela Violetta, broadcast from 2012 to 2015, starring Tini, and to the singer's last concert before her father get sicken.

== Live performances ==
In a series of concerts in promotion of Un Mechón de Pelo starting on 20 April 2024, Tini performed live "Pa" at the Asociación Civil Hurlingham Club in Buenos Aires.

== Charts ==
Chart performance for "Pa"
| Chart (2024) | Peak position |
|---|---|
| Argentina (Argentina Hot 100) | 1 |
| Argentina National Songs (Monitor Latino) | 13 |
| Spain (PROMUSICAE) | 52 |
| Uruguay (CUD) | 16 |
