= Me Dejé Llevar =

Studio album by Christian Nodal
- Released: August 25, 2017
- Genre: Mariachi
- Length: 42:52
- Language: Spanish
- Label: Fonovisa; Universal México
- Producer: Jaime González

Christian Nodal chronology
Me Dejé Llevar (2017)	Ahora (2019)

Singles from Me Dejé Llevar
- 1. "Adiós Amor" Released: April 14, 2016; 2. "Probablemente" Released: June 9, 2017; 3. "Me Dejé Llevar" Released: October 27, 2017; 4. "Te Fallé" Released: May 18, 2018

Me Dejé Llevar (transl. I Got Carried Away) is the debut studio album by Mexican musician and singer-songwriter Christian Nodal, released on August 25, 2017. Produced by Jaime González, it sees Nodal experiment with "mariacheño", a fusion of mariachi and norteño.

Me Dejé Llevar reached number two on the Billboard Top Latin Albums chart in the United States and number seven on the Mexican Albums Chart. Four singles were released from the album: "Adiós Amor", "Probablemente", "Me Dejé Llevar", and "Te Fallé". Thom Jurek of AllMusic gave the album a positive review and called it, "lush and elegant". The album garnered a Latin Grammy nomination for Best Ranchero Album at the 19th Annual Latin Grammy Awards in 2018, while "Probablemente", was awarded a Latin Grammy Award for Best Regional Mexican Song.

== Commercial performance ==
In Mexico, the album peaked at number seven on the Top 100 Mexico albums chart. In the United States, it peaked at number two on the Billboard Top Latin Albums and number one on the Billboard Regional Mexican Albums charts. The album was certified triple-platinum (Latin field) by the Recording Industry Association of America (RIAA).

== Promotion ==
"Adiós Amor" was released as the lead single from the album on January 13, 2017. It topped the charts in El Salvador, Guatemala, Mexico, and the United States. In the United States, it was certified 21× Platinum (Latin) by the Recording Industry Association of America (RIAA) for shipments of 1,260,000 copies. "Probablemente" was the second single released on June 9, 2017. In the United States, it was certified 5× Platinum (Latin) by the Recording Industry Association of America (RIAA) for shipments of 300,000 copies. "Adiós Amor" and "Probablemente" were both nominated for Regional Mexican Song of the Year, with the former taking the recognition at the 2018 Billboard Latin Music Awards. "Me Dejé Llevar" was the third track released on October 27, 2017. "Te Fallé" was the fourth song released on May 18, 2018. In the United States, it was certified double platinum (Latin) by the Recording Industry Association of America (RIAA) for shipments of 120,000 copies.

== Reception and accolades ==
Professional ratings
Review scores
Source	Rating
AllMusic	4/5 stars

Thom Jurek of AllMusic gave the album four out of five stars, calling the mariachi-inspired arrangements "lush and elegant". Jurek further stated Nodal "evokes traces of the great romantic singers like Vincente Fernandez, and Luis Miguel."

Me Dejé Llevar earned a Latin Grammy nomination for Best Ranchero Album at the 19th Annual Latin Grammy Awards in 2018, which went to Luis Miguel for ¡México Por Siempre!. It was nominated for Regional Mexican Album of the Year at the 2018 Billboard Latin Music Awards, while Nodal was awarded Regional Mexican Artist of the Year and New Artist of the Year.

== Track listing ==
No.	Title	Writer(s)	Length
1.	"Adiós Amor"	Salvador Garza	3:19
2.	"Probablemente"	Christian Nodal	3:53
3.	"Te Voy A Olvidar"	Manuel Monterrosas	3:02
4.	"Eres"	Adriel Favela	2:57
5.	"Me Dejé Llevar"	Christian Nodal	3:01
6.	"Te Fallé"	Christian Nodal	3:51
7.	"Vas A Querer Regresar"	Cuitla Vega	3:10
8.	"Yo No Sé Mañana"	Jorge Luis Piloto; Jorge Villamizar	3:26
9.	"Se Me Olvidaba"	Luis Gonzalo Lomelí	3:03
10.	"Es Mentira"	Christian Nodal	2:52
11.	"Probablemente" (featuring David Bisbal)	Christian Nodal	3:53
12.	"La Venia Bendita" (featuring Benito Camacho)	Marco Antonio Solís	3:01
Total length:			42:52

== Chart performance ==
=== Weekly charts ===
Chart (2017)	Peak position
Mexico (Top 100 Mexico)	7
US Billboard 200	69
US Top Latin Albums (Billboard)	2
US Regional Mexican Albums (Billboard)	1

=== Year-end charts ===
Chart (2017)	Position
US Top Latin Albums (Billboard)	31
Chart (2018)	Position
US Top Latin Albums (Billboard)	8
Chart (2019)	Position
US Top Latin Albums (Billboard)	18
Chart (2020)	Position
US Top Latin Albums (Billboard)	33
Chart (2021)	Position
US Top Latin Albums (Billboard)	35

== Certifications ==
Region	Certification	Certified units/sales
Mexico (AMPROFON)	2× Platinum+Gold	150,000^{‡}
United States (RIAA)	3× Platinum (Latin)	180,000^{‡}
^{‡} Sales+streaming figures based on certification alone.

== See also ==
- 2017 in Latin music
