= Christian Nodal =

Mexican singer and songwriter (born 1999)

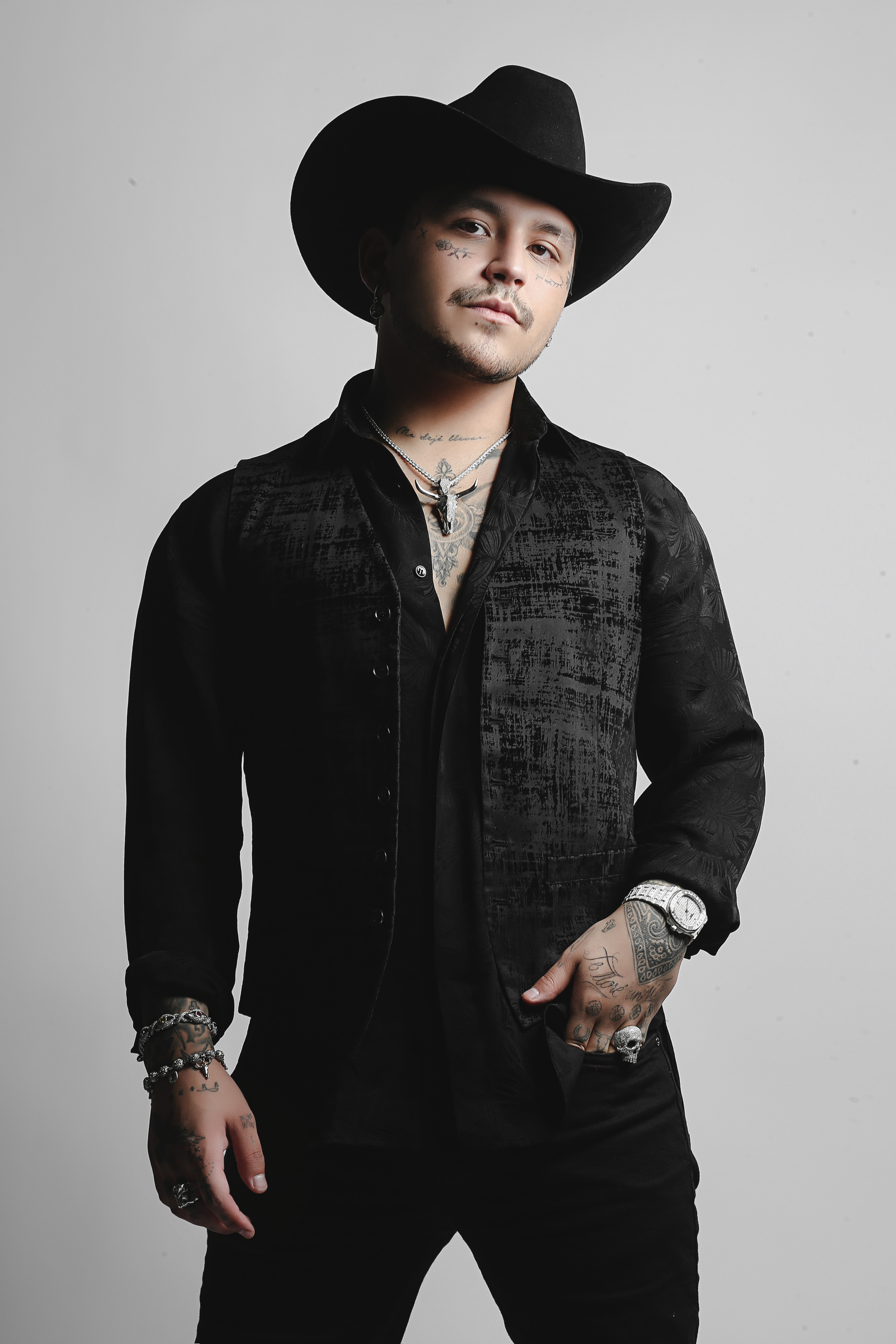
- Nodal in 2022
- Born: Christian Jesús González Nodal; 11 January 1999 (age 27); Caborca, Sonora, Mexico
- Occupations: Singer; songwriter
- Years active: 2016–present
- Spouse: Ángela Aguilar (m. 2024)
- Children: 1
- Musical career
- Genres: Regional Mexican; Latin pop
- Instruments: Vocals; guitar; piano
- Labels: Sony Mexico; Universal Latin; Fonovisa
- Website: shop.christiannodal.com

Christian Jesús González Nodal (born 11 January 1999) is a Mexican singer and songwriter. Born and raised in Sonora, he is mainly known for popularizing "mariacheño", a fusion genre between mariachi and norteño music. Nodal has won six Latin Grammy Awards, a Lo Nuestro Award, two Billboard Latin Music Awards, and a Latin American Music Award.

Nodal began his musical career at the age of seventeen when he signed with Universal Music Latin in 2016. He released his debut studio album, Me Dejé Llevar, in February 2017. The album was met with critical and commercial success, becoming Nodal's first and only top-ten entry on the AMPROFON Top 100 Mexico chart, peaking at number seven. The singles "Adiós Amor" and "Te Fallé" peaked at number one on the Monitor Latino Top 20 General Mexican Songs chart, while the singles "Probablemente" and "Me Dejé Llevar" peaked at number two and three respectively. He released his second studio album, Ahora, in 2019. It peaked at number nineteen on the Top 100 Mexico and scored three top-ten hits with the singles "No Te Contaron Mal", 'Nada Nuevo", and "De Los Besos Que Te Di".

In 2021, the single "Botella Tras Botella" with rapper Gera MX became the first regional Mexican song to enter the Billboard Hot 100, peaking at number 60. As of September 2023, the song is currently Nodal's most streamed song on Spotify. In February 2022, Nodal signed with Sony Music Mexico after being sued by Universal Music Latin; three months later, Nodal released the extended play Forajido, which peaked at number 28 on the Billboard Top Latin Albums chart. The EP spawned the single "Ya No Somos Ni Seremos", which topped the Billboard Mexico Songs chart. Over a year later in May 2023, Nodal released a follow-up EP, Forajido 2, which contained the top-ten singles "Quédate" and "Un Cumbión Dolido".

== Early life ==
Christian Nodal was born and raised in Caborca, Sonora, Mexico, to musicians Cristina Silvia Nodal and Jaime González. According to Nodal in an interview with El País, his grandfather Ramón would teach him how to write rhyme poems on a napkin at a young age, stating, "he taught me to write rhymes. We read them out loud and then, when I started to understand, he said, 'Try to make sure that what you write is always as honest and pure as possible'".

Nodal started creating music at the age of four and later learned how to play the piano and guitar on his own by age thirteen. At the same age, he wrote his first song for a crush he had in middle school. In an interview with Rolling Stone, Nodal stated that "there was always music in my house... my neighbors, they took me house to house and taught me a little bit about how to play the guitar and the trumpet".

== Career ==
=== 2016–2017: Early beginnings and Me Dejé Llevar ===
Before signing to a record label, Nodal would post videos on Facebook, which garnered him internet virality. In April 2016, Nodal signed to Universal Music Latin and released a cover of the song "Adiós Amor" as his debut single. The song quickly became a success in Mexico and the United States; it topped the Monitor Latino Top 20 General Mexican Songs chart and peaked at number four on the Billboard Hot Latin Songs, becoming the first regional Mexican song to enter the top five since "Solo Con Verte" by Banda Sinaloense MS de Sergio Lizárraga. In June 2017, Nodal collaborated with Spanish singer David Bisbal on the single "Probablemente", which peaked at number two on the Monitor Latino charts. In an interview with Billboard, Bisbal said, "...not only is he [Nodal] a great interpreter but also a songwriter. I love what he's doing and it's an honor to be a part of the early stages in his career".

In August 2017, Nodal released his debut studio album, Me Dejé Llevar. It peaked at number seven on the Top 100 Mexico chart and the Billboard Top Latin Albums in the United States. Thom Jurek, a music critic for AllMusic, gave high praise for the album, particularly referring to the mariachi instrumentals as "lush and elegant". He further stated, "Nodal wrote seven of these 13 songs, but given his performances, he may as well have penned them all... in these songs and others, Nodal evokes traces of the great romantic singers like Vicente Fernandez, and Luis Miguel". In 2018, the album was nominated for the Latin Grammy Award for Best Ranchero Album at the 19th Annual Latin Grammy Awards, which ultimately went to Miguel's ¡Mexico Por Siempre!, while "Probablemente" won Best Regional Mexican Song. Nodal was also nominated for Best New Artist but lost to Colombian reggaeton singer and rapper Karol G. Me Dejé Llevar was certified three times platinum by the Recording Industry Association of America's (RIAA) Latin field in May 2018 and diamond by the Asociación Mexicana de Productores de Fonogramas y Videogramas (AMPROFON) in July.

=== 2018–2020: Ahora, Ayayay!, and La Voz Mexico ===
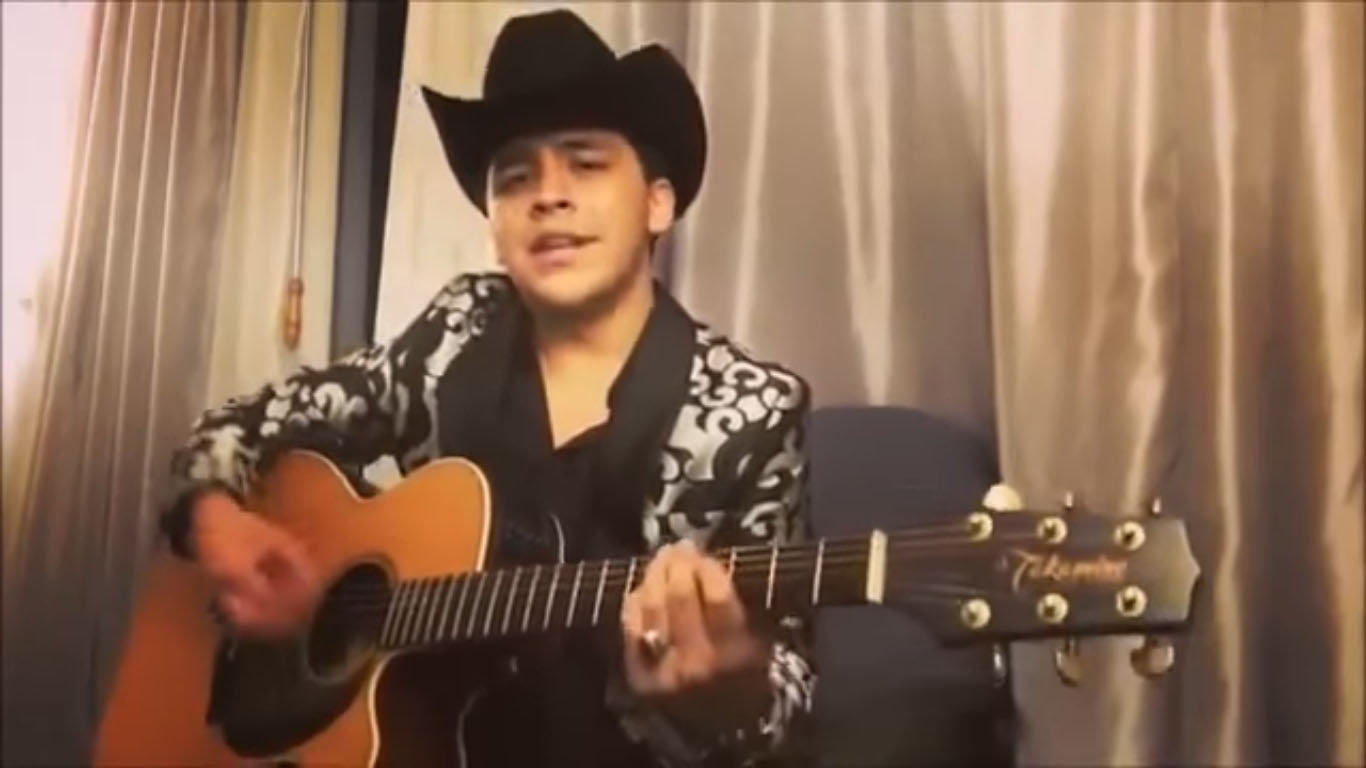
Nodal performing in 2018

In 2018, Nodal accompanied Mexican performer Pepe Aguilar, his brother Antonio Aguilar Jr., his daughter Ángela Aguilar and his son Leonardo Aguilar on their Jaripeo tour, dubbed Jaripeo Sin Fronteras. According to Ángela, Nodal was invited by Pepe to open the concert.

In May 2019, Nodal released his second studio album, Ahora. The album was a commercial success, although less so than Me Deje Llevar, peaking at number nineteen on the Top 100 Mexico chart and at number seven on the Billboard Top Latin Albums chart in the United States. Sami Drasin of Billboard gave the album a positive review, stating "Despite having similar ranchera melodies and mariachi tunes throughout the production, each track tells its own heartfelt story and demonstrates Nodal's mature sound". The lead single "No Te Contaron Mal", which peaked at number four on the Monitor Latino charts, won Regional Mexican Song of the Year at the 2021 BMI Latin Awards. The singles "Nada Nuevo" and "De Los Besos Que Te Di" peaked at number eight and number three respectively. Nodal initiated the Ahora Tour in 2019 to promote the album, which terminated in Miami prematurely due to the COVID-19 pandemic.

In May 2020, Nodal released his debut (Note: Technically, Nodal's first EP was Lo Más Nuevo (2018), which was only available in select countries.) extended play (EP), Ayayay!, which peaked at number eight on the Top Latin Albums chart. In November, Nodal released the single "Dime Cómo Quieres", a duet with Ángela Aguilar. According to Ángela, Nodal had previously sent the song to her father Pepe Aguilar, stating that "something was missing from his [Nodal] album and that he believed that something was me". The song peaked at number one on the Monitor Latino charts. Full-length deluxe and super deluxe versions of Ayayay! were released in September and November respectively. The EP was nominated for Best Ranchero/Mariachi Album at the 21st Annual Latin Grammy Awards and later nominated for the same award as the super deluxe edition. The EP and super deluxe versions were also nominated for the Grammy Award for Best Regional Mexican Music Album (including Tejano) at the 63rd and 64th Annual Grammy Awards, becoming Nodal's first Grammy Award nominations. The single "Aquí Abajo" won the award for Best Regional Mexican Song at the Latin Grammys.

From June to September 2020, Nodal was featured as a coach on the ninth season of La Voz Mexico. His final contestant, Fernando Sujo, won the season making Nodal the winning coach.

=== 2021–2023: "Botella Tras Botella" and Forajido EPs ===
In April 2021, Nodal released the single "Botella Tras Botella", in collaboration with Mexican rapper Gera MX. The song peaked at number 60 on the Billboard Hot 100 and made history as being the first regional Mexican song to enter the chart. It also became Nodal's highest-peaking entry on the Hot Latin Songs and the Billboard Global 200, peaking at number three and nine respectively.

In May 2021, Nodal recorded a version of José Alfredo Jiménez's "Si Nos Dejan" with singer Belinda, to whom he would later be engaged to. Nodal's version of the song was later used as the main theme for the telenovela of the same name. In September 2021, Nodal released the single "La Sinvergüenza", featuring regional Mexican banda group Banda Sinaloense MS de Sergio Lizárraga, which peaked at number two on the Monitor Latino charts and at 20 on the Billboard Mexico Songs chart, part of the Hits of the World series. In January 2022, he released a re-recording of the single "Te Lloré un Río" with Mexican rock band Maná, which became his eighth entry to top the Monitor Latino charts. In the following month, he released the single "Ya No Somos Ni Seremos". Although the single did not enter the Monitor Latino charts, it became Nodal's first number-one entry on the Mexico Songs chart.

In May 2022, Nodal released his second EP, Forajido, which peaked at number 28 on the Billboard Top Latin Albums chart. It consisted of six songs, with "Ya No Somos Ni Seremos", "La Sinvergüenza" and "Vivo en el 6" being released as singles. Over a year later in May 2023, a follow-up EP, Forajido 2, was released and peaked at number forty-two on the Top Latin Albums. The EP spawned the singles "Por el Resto de Tu Vida" with Argentine singer Tini, "Un Cumbión Dolido" and "Quédate". In September 2023, Nodal released his fourth EP, México en Mi Voz. Consisting of five popular regional Mexican songs, it was released in celebration of the Grito de Dolores. In an interview with Billboard Argentina, Nodal stated "This EP means a lot to me. I am from Sonora, and on the 16th of September, in every house, you listen to Mexican music".

== Artistry and public image ==
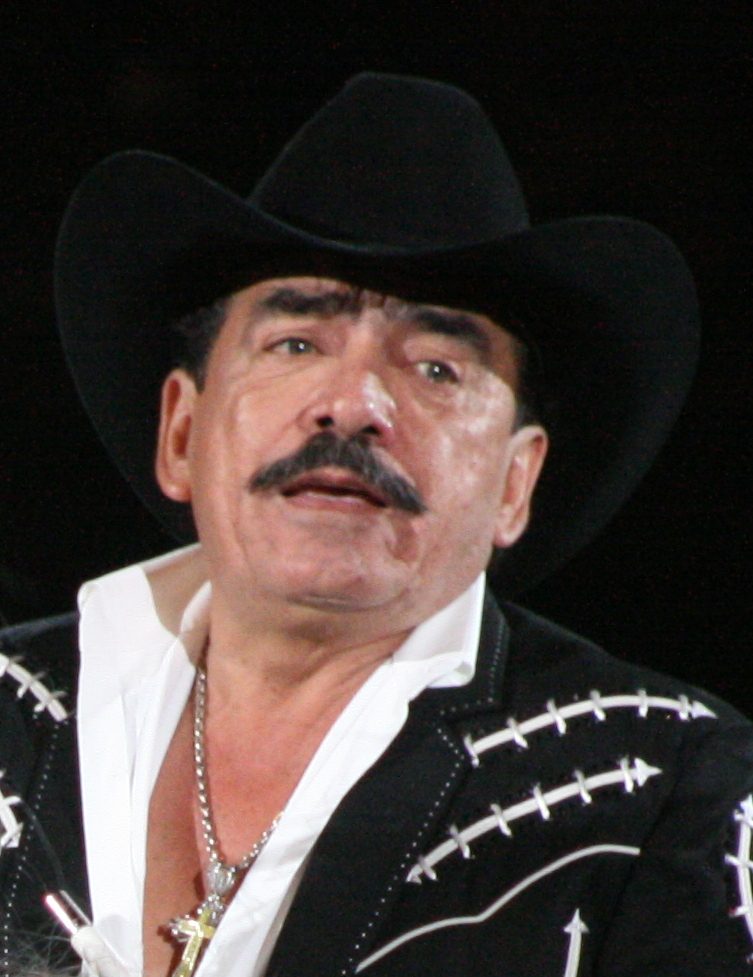
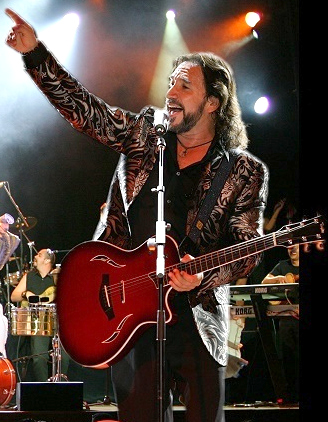
Nodal cites Joan Sebastian (left) and Marco Antonio Solís (right) as influences in his songwriting.

Nodal is often recognized for his unique blend of mariachi and norteño music, dubbed "mariacheño". In a YouTube interview with Amazon Music, Nodal cited Ariel Camacho – whose band, Los Plebes del Rancho, would later collaborate with Nodal – as one of the main influences in his musical style: "I was inspired, from the beginning of my career, by Ariel Camacho [...] He was at the top of regional Mexican music, because he was very young, and went through the same thing I went through". In a Rolling Stone interview, he cited Joan Sebastian and Marco Antonio Solís as inspirations in his music.

=== Feud with J Balvin ===
In June 2022, Colombian singer and rapper J Balvin posted a photograph on Instagram, which showed himself and Nodal both with their hair bleached blond and wearing sunglasses, captioned "find the differences." Nodal would repost the image with the caption "[The difference is] that I have actual talent and can proudly sing my compositions, how I want to, [and] wherever with pride"; Balvin would later post a video apologizing but controversially filtered the word "Belinda" on his post.

Days after the Instagram posts, Nodal released the diss track "Girasol" aimed at Balvin. Nodal would, however, later retract his statements by stating that he "forgave him for his lack of consciousness", stating further, "maybe if they would've asked me if I was ok with him posting that photo to his 50 million followers it would have been different. But on the contrary, I was hurt by the taunts and being exposed". Balvin would as well post to Instagram, acknowledging that Nodal was undergoing a difficult period of time and that they had privately come to a settlement. In an interview with ¡Hola!, Nodal clarified that he was at a difficult stage of his life, further stating, "there was a more private context in the messages, so I think he probably wanted to make a duet or something, and it was the way. I was coming from 'I will not be anyone's meme,' and especially not with someone with millions [of followers]".

=== Legal dispute with Universal Music ===
Under Universal Music Latino and its Fonovisa imprint, Nodal released his first major-label recordings: Me Dejé Llevar (2017), Ahora (2019), and Ayayay! (2020). He later stated that he had been a minor when his parents signed the contract with Universal and argued that the agreement failed to respect his author's rights. Universal rejected those assertions, maintaining that the contract was valid and that the company had fulfilled its obligations related to payment and promotion.

The dispute became public in November 2021, when Nodal announced via Instagram Live that he no longer considered himself bound by the Universal contract and criticized what he described as a "veto" by the label that restricted collaborations and promotion. Around the same time, industry reports indicated that Universal had notified third parties not to market or distribute his recordings. Nodal and his parents subsequently filed a civil suit seeking recognition of ownership over his catalog, while Universal initiated its own legal actions to block those claims and affirm its rights to the recordings.

The dispute escalated after Nodal signed with Sony Music Mexico and Sony Music Latin in February 2022. Between 2022 and 2024, Universal expanded its litigation, alleging that certain documents submitted by Nodal and his parents in the civil case contained irregularities or forged signatures. The company further claimed that his parents had undertaken these actions to illegitimately transfer ownership of the music to Nodal.

A hearing related to the forgery allegations was held on 18 November 2025, at the Reclusorio Oriente prison complex in Mexico City. The judge determined not to bring Nodal to trial at that time, concluding that the Attorney General's Office (FGR) and Universal had not presented sufficient evidence. Nodal publicly claimed that he and his family had been exonerated, calling the outcome a "victory". The FGR, however, issued a statement disputing that characterization, noting that the decision was provisional, the investigation remained open, and that the agency intended to appeal.

== Personal life ==
In May 2021, Nodal announced his engagement with singer and actress Belinda, whom he met on the set of the reality television series La Voz. The two would later separate in February 2022 as announced on social media, with Nodal stating, "I want to share that we've decided to end our engagement and our relationship as a couple, taking with us the best of each other... I ask that the decision we've taken is met with respect, where each of us will live the separation process in their own way, always wishing the best to the other for the happy times together as well as the trying times. All speculation is false. To the media, with much respect, I will not be speaking about this topic anymore".

Shortly after ending his relationship with Belinda, Nodal began dating Argentine singer and rapper Cazzu. However, the two kept their relationship private until sometime during 2023. Their reveal followed Cazzu confirming rumors that Nodal had moved to Argentina, which circulated after it was discovered that he had purchased a lot in Buenos Aires. In April 2023, she confirmed her pregnancy during one of her concerts, with Nodal disclosing the due date to be sometime in September. He later mentioned the sex of the baby to be female. Two months later, Nodal and Cazzu went to France for unknown reasons, starting online speculation of a proposal. The baby, named Inti, was born on 14 September 2023, in Argentina; Nodal and Cazzu officially announced her birth on social media the next day. Nodal's relationship with Cazzu ended in May of 2024.

Nodal began a relationship with Angela Aguilar a week after breaking up with Cazzu in May of 2024. The two previously worked together on the show "El Show de el Piolín" in 2018. The pair married just 2 months after split with Cazzu in a private ceremony on a ranch in Morelos, Mexico in July 2024.

=== Tattoos ===
Over the course of his career, Nodal had accumulated a number of tattoos on his arms, hands, body, and face, with Nodal referring to himself as "addicted". Though he has never explicitly stated how many tattoos he has, some fans estimate that Nodal had around 30 in total. Some of the tattoos, mainly his facial tattoos, have had their meanings revealed: notably, Nodal has a flower, representing love; a cross, representing his faith; the moon, representing inspiration; a moneybag, which represents the Forajido EP; and a cactus, which represents his hometown of Caborca, Sonora.

Nodal previously had several tattoos for his ex-girlfriend Belinda, including her eyes on his chest, a heart with the words "utopia" written aside it, and the words "Beli" written next to his right ear. Following his break-up with Belinda, Nodal removed some of his tattoos, and apparently modified the "Beli" tattoo into the four playing card suits. In 2023, Nodal revealed that he would have his facial tattoos removed, stating, "I want my daughter to meet me... I want her to see my face without them". Nodal later stated that he would not be removing all of his tattoos, stating "It's a very painful and tiring process... It's complicated because you have to put on creams and you need to be careful with the sun, and I'm not the type of person who takes care of their face".

== Discography ==
=== Studio albums ===
List of studio albums, with selected details, chart positions
Title	Album details	Peak chart positions				Certifications
Title	Album details	MEX	US	US Latin	MEX Reg.	Certifications
Me Dejé Llevar	Release date: August 25, 2017; Label: Universal Music Latin Entertainment, Fonovisa; Format: CD, digital download, streaming	7	69	2	1	AMPROFON: 2× Platinum+Gold; RIAA: 3× Platinum (Latin)
Ahora	Release date: May 10, 2019; Label: Universal Music Latin Entertainment, Fonovisa; Format: CD, digital download, streaming	19	—	7	1	RIAA: Platinum (Latin)
Ayayay!	Released: May 29, 2020; Label: Universal Music Latin Entertainment, Fonovisa; Format: CD, digital download, streaming	—	—	8	1	AMPROFON: Gold; RIAA: Gold (Latin)
¿Quién + Como Yo?	Released: May 22, 2025; Label: Sony Music Mexico; Format: Digital download, streaming	—	—	—	—	
Bandera Blanca	Released: May 21, 2026; Label: Sony Music Mexico; Format: Digital download, streaming	—	—	—	—	
"—" denotes a recording that did not chart.

=== Compilations ===
List of compilation albums
Title	Details
Amor de Invierno	Released: December 4, 2020; Label: Universal Music Latin; Format: Digital download, streaming
Nodal	Released: December 1, 2020; Label: Universal Music Latin; Format: Digital download, streaming
Mamacita	Released: December 18, 2020; Label: Universal Music Latin; Format: Digital download, streaming

=== Collaborative albums ===
List of collaborative studio albums
Title	Details
Recordando a Una Leyenda (with Los Plebes del Rancho de Ariel Camacho)	Released: May 21, 2021; Label: JG Music, Universal Music Latin Entertainment; Format: Digital download, streaming

=== Extended plays ===
List of extended plays, with selected details, chart positions
Title	Album details	Peak chart positions		Certifications
Title	Album details	US Latin	MEX Reg.	Certifications
Lo Más Nuevo (Note: Lo Más Nuevo was only available in various countries)	Released: May 28, 2018; Label: Universal Music Latin Entertainment; Fonovisa; Formats: Digital download	–	–	
Forajido	Released: May 27, 2022; Label: Sony Music Mexico; Formats: Digital download, streaming	28	6	AMPROFON: 3× Platinum; RIAA: Platinum (Latin)
Forajido 2	Released: May 29, 2023; Label: Sony Music Mexico; Formats: Digital download, streaming	42	11	RIAA: Platinum (Latin)
México En Mi Voz	Released: September 14, 2023; Label: Sony Music Mexico; Formats: Digital download, streaming	—	—	
Pa'l Cora, EP 01	Released: August 29, 2024; Label: Sony Music Mexico; Formats: Digital download, streaming	—	—	RIAA: Gold (Latin)
Pa'l Cora, EP 02	Released: January 30, 2025; Label: Sony Music Mexico; Formats: Digital download, streaming	—	—	

=== Singles ===
==== As lead artist ====
Title	Year	Peak chart positions						Certifications	Album
Title	Year	MEX	ARG	US	US Latin	US Reg. Mex	WW	Certifications	Album
"Adiós Amor"	2017	1	—	— (Note: "Adiós Amor" did not enter the Billboard Hot 100, but peaked at number five on the Bubbling Under Hot 100 chart.)	4	1	—	AMPROFON: Diamond + Gold; RIAA: 21× Platinum (Latin)	Me Dejé Llevar
"Te Fallé"	2017	1	—	—	24	1	—	AMPROFON: Gold; RIAA: 2× Platinum (Latin)	Me Dejé Llevar
"Probablemente" (solo or featuring David Bisbal)	2017	2	—	—	15	1	—	AMPROFON: Platinum + Gold; RIAA: 5× Platinum (Latin)	Me Dejé Llevar
"Me Dejé Llevar"	2017	3	—	—	23	1	—	AMPROFON: Gold; RIAA: Platinum (Latin)	Me Dejé Llevar
"No Te Contaron Mal"	2018	4	—	— (Note: "No Te Contaron Mal" did not enter the Billboard Hot 100, but peaked at number 18 on the Bubbling Under Hot 100 chart.)	10	1	—	RIAA: 8× Platinum (Latin)	Ahora
"Nada Nuevo"	2019	8	—	—	19	1	—	RIAA: Platinum (Latin)	Ahora
"De Los Besos Que Te Di"	2019	3	—	—	12	1	—	RIAA: Gold (Latin)	Ahora
"Pa' Olvidarme De Ella" (with Piso 21)	2019	—	—	—	—	—	—	RIAA: 4× Platinum (Latin)	El Amor en los Tiempos del Perreo
"Se Me Olvidó"	2020	1	—	—	16	1	—	RIAA: 2× Platinum (Latin)	Ayayay!
"Ayayay!"	2020	—	—	—	—	—	—	RIAA: Gold (Latin)	Ayayay!
"Aquí Abajo"	2020	2	—	—	14	1	—		Ayayay!
"Dime Cómo Quieres" (with Ángela Aguilar)	2020	1	—	— (Note: "Dime Cómo Quieres" did not enter the Billboard Hot 100, but peaked at number 22 on the Bubbling Under Hot 100 chart.)	8	1	89	RIAA: 7× Platinum (Latin); AMPROFON: Diamond	Ayayay!
"Poco" (with Reik)	2020	3	—	—	— (Note: "Poco" did not enter the Billboard Hot Latin Songs chart, but peaked at number 16 on the Billboard Latin Digital Song Sales chart.)	38	—		Non-album singles
"Duele" (with Alejandro Fernández)	2021	1	—	—	25	1	—		Non-album singles
"2 Veces" (with Los Plebes del Rancho de Ariel Camacho)	2021	4	—	—	24	1	—		Recordando a Una Leyenda
"Botella Tras Botella" (with Gera MX)	2021	1	—	60	3	6	9	RIAA: 14× Platinum (Latin); AMPROFON: Diamond+Platinum+Gold	Non-album single
"La Sinvergüenza" (with Banda MS)	2021	2	—	—	20	1	—	RIAA: 4× Platinum (Latin); AMPROFON: 3× Platinum	Forajido
"Ya No Somos Ni Seremos"	2022	1	—	— (Note: "Ya No Somos Ni Seremos" did not enter the Billboard Hot 100, but peaked at number three on the Bubbling Under Hot 100 chart.)	8	3	36	RIAA: 7× Platinum (Latin); AMPROFON: Diamond+3× Platinum	Forajido
"Te Llore Un Río" (with Maná)	2022	1	—	—	47	3	—		Noches de Cantina
"Aguardiente"	2022	—	—	—	—	—	—	RIAA: Gold (Latin); AMPROFON: Gold	Forajido
"Vivo en el 6"	2022	3	—	—	44	1	—	RIAA: Gold (Latin)	Forajido
"Por el Resto de Tu Vida" (with Tini)	2023	—	63	—	—	—	—	AMPROFON: 2× Platinum	Forajido 2
"Un Cumbión Dolido"	2023	2	—	—	—	1	—	AMPROFON: Gold	Forajido 2
"Quédate"	2023	7	—	—	—	—	—		Forajido 2
"Fuego de Noche, Nieve de Día" (with Ricky Martin)	2023	—	93	—	—	—	—		Non-album single
"La Intención" (with Peso Pluma)	2024	9	—	92	13	1	96	AMPROFON: Platinum+Gold; RIAA: Platinum (Latin)	Pa'l Cora, EP 01
"Ya Pedo Quién Sabe" (with Grupo Frontera)	2024	—	—	—	29	6	—		Jugando a Que No Pasa Nada
"Kbron y Medio"	2024	—	—	—	—	—	—		Pa'l Cora, EP 01
"No Me 100to Bien"	2024	—	—	—	—	—	—		Pa'l Cora, EP 01
"El Amigo"	2025	—	—	—	—	—	—		¿Quién + Como Yo?
"Ame"	2025	—	—	—	—	—	—		¿Quién + Como Yo?
"X Perro"	2025	—	—	—	—	—	—		¿Quién + Como Yo?
"La Que Se Fue, Se Fue"	2025	—	—	—	—	—	—		Non-album singles
"Sabina"	2025	—	—	—	—	—	—		Non-album singles
"Incompatibles"	2026	—	—	—	—	—	—		Bandera Blanca
"Un Vals"	2026	—	—	—	—	—	—		Bandera Blanca
"Miel Con Licor"	2026	—	—	—	—	—	—		Bandera Blanca

==== As featured artist ====
Title	Year	Peak chart positions	Album
Title	Year	US Regional MEX	Album
"Solos" (Ana Bárbara featuring Christian Nodal)	2019	11	Non-album single

=== Promotional singles ===
Title	Year	Peak chart positions	Certifications	Album
Title	Year	US Latin	Certifications	Album
"Yo No Sé Mañana"	2017	—	RIAA: Gold (Latin)	Me Dejé Llevar
"Eres"	2017	48	RIAA: Platinum (Latin)	Me Dejé Llevar
"Nace Un Borracho"	2020	46		Ayayay!
"Solo Un Sueño"	2021	—		Non-album single
"Por No Perderte Te Perdí" (with Los Plebes del Rancho de Ariel Camacho)	2021	—		Recordando A Una Leyenda
"Vida Truncada" (with Los Plebes del Rancho de Ariel Camacho)	2021	—		Recordando A Una Leyenda
"Ya Lo Superé" (with Los Plebes del Rancho de Ariel Camacho)	2021	—		Recordando A Una Leyenda
"Amarga Derrota" (with Los Plebes del Rancho de Ariel Camacho)	2021	—		Recordando A Una Leyenda
"Si Nos Dejan" (with Belinda)	2021	—		Non-album single
"—" denotes a recording that did not chart.

=== Other charted songs and certifications ===
List of other charted songs and certifications, with selected chart positions
Title	Year	Peaks	Certifications	Album
Title	Year	MEX	Certifications	Album
"Tequila" (with Juanes)	2019	1	RIAA: Gold (Latin)	Más Futuro Que Pasado
"La Mitad" (with Camilo)	2020	18	AMPROFON: Platinum	Por Primera Vez
"—" denotes a recording that did not chart or was not released in that territory.

=== Guest appearances ===
List of other album appearances
Title	Year	Other artist(s)	Album
"No Pasa de Moda"	2017	Los Plebes del Rancho de Ariel Camacho	Lo Más Nuevo
"Te Marqué Pedo (Remix)"	2022	Alex Luna and DAAZ	Non-album single
"Cuando Me Dé la Gana"	2022	Christina Aguilera	Aguilera
"Me Extraño"	2022	Romeo Santos	Fórmula, Vol. 3

== Tours ==
- Ahora Tour (2019–2020)
- Ayayay! Tour (2021)
- Botella Tras Botella Tour (2021)
- Forajido Tour (2022)
- Foraji2 Tour (2023–2024)

== Awards and nominations ==
Christian Nodal has won ten Lo Nuestro Awards, ten Latin American Music Awards, seven Billboard Latin Music Awards, five iHeartRadio Music Awards, seven Latin Grammy Awards, three Premios Juventud, two Heat Latin Music Awards, and a Premio Tu Música Urbano.
