= 2023 in Latin music =

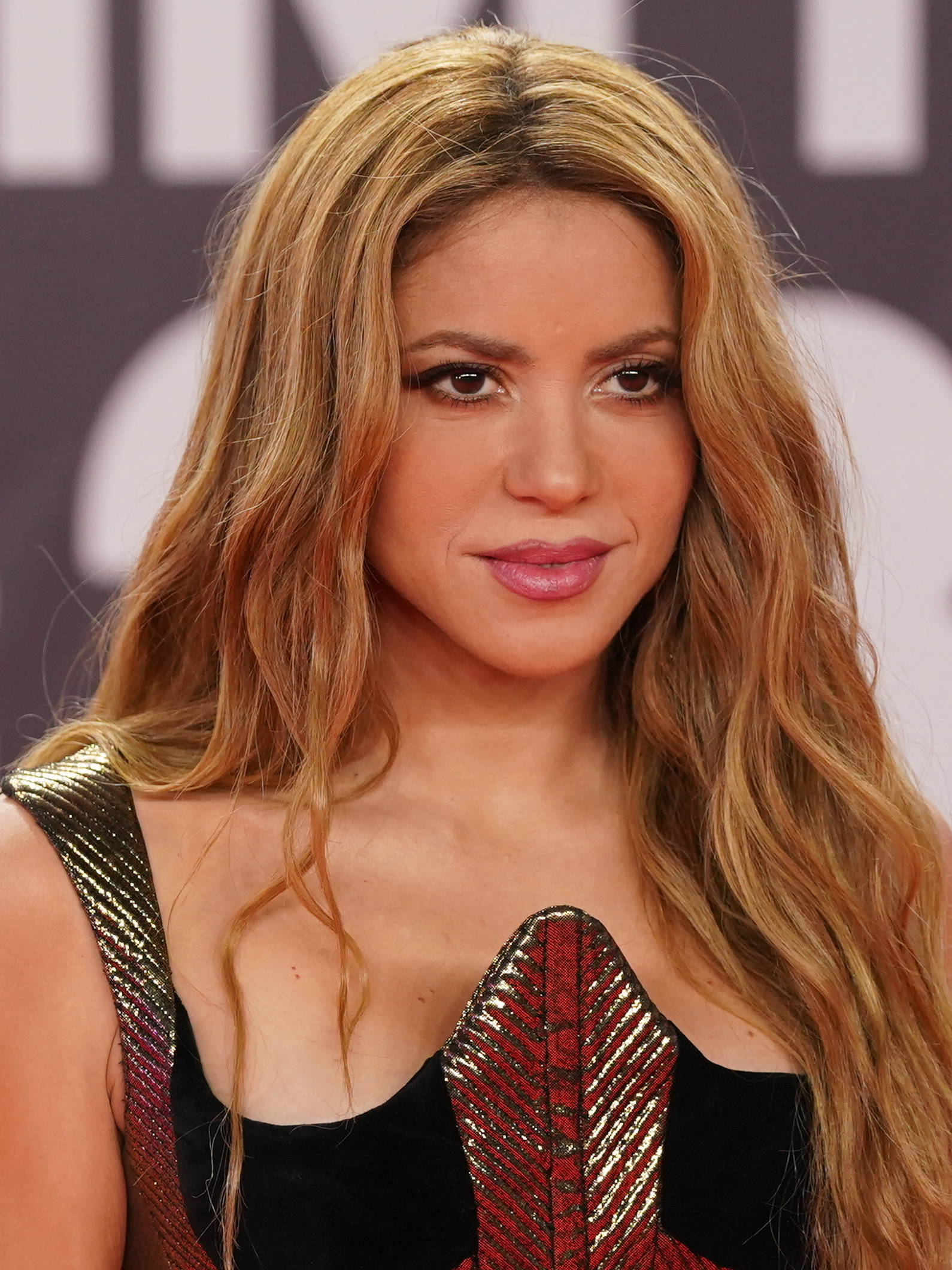
Shakira breaks multiple records with her latest recording.

The following is a list of events and new Spanish and Portuguese-language music that happened in 2023 in the Latin music industry, namely music released in Ibero-America. Ibero-America encompasses Latin America, Spain, Portugal, and the Latino population in Canada and the United States.

== Events ==
=== January–March ===
- January 8 – Daddy Yankee makes his final concert after performing for 32 years. It was held at Hiram Bithorn Stadium in San Juan, Puerto Rico.
- January 12 – After just nine hours, "Shakira: Bzrp Music Sessions, Vol. 53", performed by Bizarrap and Shakira, breaks the record of the most streamed Spanish-language song on YouTube in a single day. It was previously held by "Despacito (remix)", performed by Luis Fonsi and Daddy Yankee featuring Justin Bieber.
- January 16 – "Shakira: Bzrp Music Sessions, Vol. 53" becomes the song with the best debut performance in Spain of the 21st century, debuting atop the chart with just one day of tracking.
- January 22 – For the first time in Spotify history, the Latin artist with the most monthly listeners is a woman: Shakira.
- February 4 – "Eaea", written by Álvaro Tato, Blanca Paloma Ramos and Jose Pablo Polo, and performed by Blanca Paloma, wins the second edition of the Benidorm Fest, and will represent Spain in the Eurovision Song Contest in Liverpool.
- February 5 – The 65th Annual Grammy Awards are scheduled to take place at Crypto.com Arena in Los Angeles.
  - Pasieros by Rubén Blades and Boca Livre wins Best Latin Pop Album.
  - Motomami by Rosalía wins Best Latin Rock or Alternative Album
  - Un Canto por México - El Musical by Natalia Lafourcade wins Best Regional Mexican Music Album.
  - Un Verano Sin Ti by Bad Bunny wins Best Música Urbana Album
  - Pa'llá Voy by Marc Anthony wins Best Tropical Latin Album.
  - Fandango at the Wall in New York by Arturo O'Farrill and The Afro Latin Jazz Orchestra featuring The Congra Patria Son Jarocho Collective wins Best Latin Jazz Album.
- February 11 – "Sintiéndolo Mucho", performed by Joaquín Sabina and Leiva, wins the Goya Award for Best Original Song.
- February 19 – The Viña del Mar International Song Festival makes its comeback after being canceled for three years due to the COVID-19 pandemic.
- February 22 – Juan Manuel Moreno, President of the Regional Government of Andalusia announces that the 24th Annual Latin Grammy Awards will take place in Seville, marking the first time the event is celebrated outside the United States.
- February 23 – The 35th Premios lo Nuestro awards ceremony takes place at the Dade Arena in Miami, United States.
  - Un Verano Sin Ti by Bad Bunny wins Album of the Year.
  - "Mamiii" by Becky G and Karol G wins Song of the Year.
  - Karol G wins Artist of the Year.
  - Bizarrap wins Best New Male Artist.
  - Kim Loaiza wins Best New Female Artist.
- February 25 – Mañana Será Bonito by Karol G breaks the record for the most-streamed female Spanish-language album in a single day with 32 million streams.
- March 1 – Becky G is awarded with the Impact Award at Billboard Women in Music, Ivy Queen is presented the Icon Award, while Rosalía receives the first-ever Producer of the Year award.
- March 4 – "TQG", performed by Karol G and Shakira, tops the Spotify Global chart, marking the second time a Latin song tops the list after "Envolver".
- March 5 – Mañana Será Bonito by Karol G becomes the first ever female Spanish-language album to debut atop the Billboard 200.
- March 11 – "Ai coração", performed by Mimicat, wins the 57th Festival da Canção, determining Portugal's entry for the Eurovision Song Contest.
- March 24 – Spanish musician Rosalía announces her engagement with Puerto Rican singer Rauw Alejandro on the music video for "Beso.

=== April–June ===
- April 6 – Billboard and Telemundo announce its inaugural Billboard Latin Women in Music event.
- April 14 – Bad Bunny headlines the twenty second edition of Coachella, becoming the first Latino artist to headline the festival. Other performers include Becky G, Rosalía, Eladio Carrión and Los Fabulosos Cadillacs.
- April 15 – Five Peso Pluma songs simultaneously chart on the Billboard Hot 100 in the United States, breaking the record as the Mexican artist with the most entries on the list, surpassing Paulina Rubio. His song "Ella Baila Sola" reaches the seventeenth spot, becoming the highest position for any Mexican in the United States, beating Thalía's "I Want You", released in 2003.
- April 17 – "Ella Baila Sola", performed by Eslabon Armado and Peso Pluma, tops the Spotify Global chart, becoming the first Regional Mexican song to do so.
- April 20 – The 8th Annual Latin American Music Awards take place at the MGM Grand Garden Arena in Las Vegas.
  - Un Verano Sin Ti by Bad Bunny wins Album of the Year.
  - "Mamiii" by Becky G and Karol G wins Song of the Year.
  - Karol G wins Artist of the Year.
  - Bizarrap wins New Artist of the Year.
- April 21 – Brazilian singer Anitta departs from Warner Music citing frustrations with the record label and signs with Universal Music.
- April 27 – The 4th Annual Premios Odeón take place in Madrid to celebrate the best in Spanish music.
  - Motomami by Rosalía wins Album of the Year.
  - "Quevedo: Bzrp Music Sessions, Vol. 52", by Bizarrap and Quevedo wins Song of the Year.
  - "Quevedo: Bzrp Music Sessions, Vol. 52", by Bizarrap and Quevedo wins Video of the Year.
  - Álvaro de Luna wins Best New Artist.
- May 7 – Shakira is awarded Woman of the Year at the inaugural edition of the Billboard Latin Women in Music. Other winners include Ana Gabriel, Emilia, María Becerra, Evaluna, Goyo, and Thalía.
- May 13 – Spain places seventeenth at the 67th edition of the Eurovision Song Contest with the song "Eaea", performed by Blanca Paloma. Portugal ends twenty-third.
- May 16 – The 25th Annual Premios Gardel take place at the Movistar Arena in Buenos Aires to celebrate the best in Argentinian music.
  - Bien o Mal by Trueno wins Album of the Year.
  - "La Triple T" by Tini wins Song of the Year.
  - "Argentina" by Trueno and Nathy Peluso wins Record of the Year.
  - Noelia Recalde wins Best New Artist.
- May 17 – The 15th Premios MIN take place at the Auditorium in Palma de Mallorca to celebrate the best in Spanish independent music.
  - Burbuja Cómoda y Elefante Inesperado by Los Estanques y Anni B Sweet win Album of the Year.
  - "Brillabas", by los Estanques y Anni B Sweet win Song of the Year.
  - Los Estanques y Anni B Sweet win Artist of the Year.
  - Los Estanques y Anni B Sweet win Best New Artist.
  - "Ay Mamá" by Rigoberta Bandini wins Video of the Year.
- May 17 – The 12th Premios Nuestra Tierra take place at the Jorge Eliecer Gaitán Theater in Bogotá to recognize the best in Colombian music.
  - "La Bachata" by Manuel Turizo wins Song of the Year.
  - Feliz Cumpleaños Ferxxo by Feid wins Album of the Year.
  - Feid wins Artist of the Year,
  - Luis Alfonso wins Best New Artist.
- May 31 – The Latin Recording Academy announces names Italian singer Laura Pausini as the Person of the Year, becoming the first musician of non Iberian-American descent to receive the honor.
- June 4 – The 9th Pulsar Awards take place in Santiago live from a TVN studio, to recognize the best in Chilean music.
  - Luzdeflash by Congreso wins Album of the Year.
  - "Chao" by Yorka wins Record of the Year.
  - "Ultra Solo" by Polimá Westcoast and Pailita wins Song of the Year.
  - "Aunque Te Mueras Por Volver" by Mon Laferte wins Video of the Year.
- June 8 – 8th Heat Latin Music Awards take place at Margaritaville Reserve Cap Cana in Punta Cana, Dominican Republic.
  - "Provenza" by Karol G wins Song of the Year.
  - Feid wins Best Male Artist.
  - Greeicy wins Best Female Artist.
  - Lit Killah wins Best New Artist.
- June 15 – The 4th Premios Tu Música Urbano take place at the Coliseo José Miguel Agrelot in San Juan, Puerto Rico.
  - Karol G wins Artist of the Year.
  - "Provenza" by Karol G wins Song of the Year.
- June 14 – Spanish singer Alejandro Sanz departs from Universal Music Group and signs on with Sony Music.
- June 15 – Puerto Rican rapper Vico C releases Pánico, his first album in fourteen years.

=== July–September ===
- July 20 – The 20th Premios Juventud take place at José Miguel Agrelot Coliseum in San Juan, Puerto Rico.
- August 4 – The 10th MTV MIAW Awards take place at Pepsi Center WTC in Mexico City, Mexico.
- September 12 - The 40th MTV Videos Music Awards take place at Prudential Center in Newark, New Jersey.
  - Anitta, Karol G, Peso Pluma & Shakira all took the stage to perform with Peso Pluma being the first regional Mexican artist to perform at the VMA's.
  - Shakira was honored with the Michael Jackson Video Vanguard Award, being presented by Wyclef Jean.
  - Karol G & Shakira took home the award for Best Collaboration for "TQG" and Anitta took home the award for Best Latin for "Funk Rave".

=== October–December ===
- October 5 – The 30th Billboard Latin Music Awards take place at Watsco Center in Coral Gables.
  - Bad Bunny wins Artist of the Year.
  - "Ella Baila Sola", performed by Eslabon Armado and Peso Pluma wins Hot Latin Song of the Year.
  - Peso Pluma wins New Artist of the Year.
- October 17 – Nicky Jam announces his retirement at age 42, after twenty years in the industry.
- October 21 – The 43rd Tejano Music Awards took place at the Boeing Center at Tech Port in San Antonio, Texas. At the event, Siggno's Jesse Turner and Mike Gonzalez & The Iconiczz were the night's biggest winners with two wins each, while Monica Saldivar received the most nominations at five. Beto Ramon was the sole honoree for the Lifetime Achievement Award after the organization rescinded Joe Lopez following backlash from fans following his 2006 conviction for multiple sex offenses.
- October 23 – "Si No Estás" by Íñigo Quintero tops the Spotify Global chart, making him the first solo Spanish singer to do so.
- October 26 – The inaugural edition of the Premios Rolling Stone en Español Awards are scheduled to take place at The Fillmore in Miami Beach.
- November 3 – The 18th edition of LOS40 Music Awards take place at the WiZink Center, in Madrid.
  - Ana Mena wins Best Spanish Act.
  - Alpha by Aitana wins Best Spanish Album.
  - "Todo Contigo" by Álvaro de Luna wins Best Spanish Song.
  - "Las Babys" by Aitana wins Best Spanish Video.
- November 5 – The 30th MTV Europe Music Awards air on MTV live from Paris.
  - Anitta wins Best Latin.
  - Mauté wins Best Brazilian Act.
  - Kenia Os wins Best Latin America North Act.
  - Feid wins Best Latin America Central Act.
  - Lali wins Best Latin America South Act.
  - Bispo wins Best Portuguese Act.
  - Samantha Hudson wins Best Spanish Act.
- November 16 – The 24th Annual Latin Grammy Awards are held at FIBES Conference and Exhibition Centre in Seville, Spain, marking the first time the awards are held outside of the United States. Women dominate the general fields for the first time:
  - "De Todas las Flores" by Natalia Lafourcade won Record of the Year.
  - Mañana Será Bonito by Colombian singer Karol G wins Album of the Year.
  - "Shakira: Bzrp Music Sessions, Vol. 53" by Shakira, Bizarrap Santiago Alvarado, Kevyn Mauricio Cruz, and wins Song of the Year
  - Joaquina wins Best New Artist.

== Number-one albums and singles by country ==
- List of Billboard Argentina Hot 100 number-one singles of 2023
- List of number-one albums of 2023 (Portugal)
- List of number-one albums of 2023 (Spain)
- List of number-one singles of 2023 (Brazil)
- List of number-one singles of 2023 (Spain)
- List of number-one Billboard Latin Albums from the 2020s
- List of Billboard Hot Latin Songs and Latin Airplay number ones of 2023

== Awards ==
=== Latin music awards ===
- 35th Lo Nuestro Awards
- 2023 Billboard Latin Music Awards
- 2023 Latin American Music Awards
- 24th Latin Grammy Awards
- 2023 Heat Latin Music Awards
- 2023 MTV MIAW Awards
- 2023 Tejano Music Awards
- 2023 Premios Juventud
- 2023 Premios Tu Música Urbano

=== Awards with Latin categories ===
- 29th Billboard Music Awards
- 64th Annual Grammy Awards
- 9th iHeartRadio Music Awards
- 17th Los40 Music Awards
- 39th MTV Video Music Awards
- 24th Teen Choice Awards
- 3rd Annual Premios Odeón

== Spanish- and Portuguese-language songs on the Billboard Global 200 ==
The Billboard Global 200 is a weekly record chart published by Billboard magazine that ranks the top songs globally based on digital sales and online streaming from over 200 territories worldwide.

An asterisk (*) represents that a single is charting for the current week.

Song	Performer(s)	Entry	Peak	Weeks	Ref.
2020 entries
"Dakiti"	Bad Bunny & Jhay Cortez	November 14, 2020	1	111	
"Feliz Navidad"	José Feliciano	November 28, 2020	5	38	
2021 entries
"Yonaguni"	Bad Bunny	June 19, 2021	3	73	
"Pepas"	Farruko	July 31, 2021	7	87	
2022 entries
"Provenza"	Karol G	May 7, 2022	6	62	
"Te Felicito"	Shakira & Rauw Alejandro	May 7, 2022	11	36	
"Moscow Mule"	Bad Bunny	May 21, 2022	2	52	
"Me Porto Bonito"	Bad Bunny & Chencho Corleone	May 21, 2022	2	79	
"Tití Me Preguntó"	Bad Bunny	May 21, 2022	4	98	
"Ojitos Lindos"	Bad Bunny & Bomba Estéreo	May 21, 2022	4	72	
"Neverita"	Bad Bunny	May 21, 2022	16	42	
"Efecto"	Bad Bunny	May 21, 2022	7	53	
"Bzrp Music Sessions, Vol. 52"	Bizarrap & Quevedo	July 23, 2022	1	60	
"Normal"	Feid	July 23, 2022	75	31	
"La Bachata"	Manuel Turizo	July 23, 2022	6	112	
"Despechá"	Rosalía	August 13, 2022	6	42	
"Lokera"	Rauw Alejandro, Lyanno & Brray	August 27, 2022	55	30	
"Gatúbela"	Karol G x Maldy	September 10, 2022	23	21	
"Feliz Cumpleaños Ferxxo"	Feid	September 17, 2022	61	42	
"Vista Al Mar"	Quevedo	October 1, 2022	114	16	
"No Se Va"	Grupo Frontera	October 8, 2022	31	35	
"Besos Moja2"	Wisin & Yandel + Rosalía	October 15, 2022	102	16	
"Punto 40"	Rauw Alejandro & Baby Rasta	October 22, 2022	72	17	
"Hey Mor"	Ozuna feat. Feid	October 29, 2022	27	42	
"Monotonía"	Shakira & Ozuna	November 5, 2022	18	19	
"Eu Gosto Assim"	Gustavo Mioto & Mari Fernández	November 5, 2022	155	5	
"Cairo"	Karol G & Ovy On The Drums	December 3, 2022	51	19	
"Evoque Prata"	MC Menor HR, MC Menor SG & DJ Escobar	December 3, 2022	147	3	
"Qué Agonía"	Yuridia & Ángela Aguilar	December 10, 2022	95	16	
"La Jumpa"	Arcángel & Bad Bunny	December 17, 2022	14	28	
"Gatita"	Bellakath	December 24, 2022	113	6	
"Marisola"	Cris Mj & Standly	December 31, 2022	70	14	
2023 entries
"Gato de Noche"	Ñengo Flow & Bad Bunny	January 7, 2023	28	14	
"Que Vuelvas"	Carín León X Grupo Frontera	January 7, 2023	34	41	
"Bombonzinho"	Israel & Rodolffo & Ana Castela	January 7, 2023	119	9	
"Bebé Dame"	Fuerza Regida X Grupo Frontera	January 14, 2023	17	29	
"Punto G"	Quevedo	January 14, 2023	66	14	
"Bzrp Music Sessions, Vol. 53"	Bizarrap & Shakira	January 21, 2023	2	29	
"Leão"	Marília Mendonça	January 21, 2023	51	13	
"Yandel 150"	Yandel & Feid	January 21, 2023	13	33	
"AMG"	Gabito Ballesteros, Peso Pluma & Natanael Cano	January 21, 2023	20	26	
"Chorrito Pa Las Ánimas"	Feid	January 21, 2023	82	21	
"Fin de Semana"	Junior H X Óscar Maydon	January 28, 2023	58	24	
"Playa del Inglés"	Quevedo & Myke Towers	January 28, 2023	128	5	
"Billete Grande"	Fuerza Regida X Edgardo Núñez	January 28, 2023	199	1	
"LLYLM"	Rosalía	February 11, 2023	66	2	
"PRC"	Peso Pluma X Natanael Cano	February 11, 2023	15	26	
"X Si Volvemos"	Karol G x Romeo Santos	February 18, 2023	18	16	
"Zona de Perigo"	Léo Santana	February 18, 2023	36	4	
"Ch y la Pizza"	Fuerza Regida X Natanael Cano	February 18, 2023	39	21	
"Mercho"	Lil CaKe & Migrantes feat. Nico Valdi	February 18, 2023	75	12	
"El Gordo Trae el Mando"	Chino Pacas	February 25, 2023	44	21	
"Di Que Sí"	Grupo Marca Registrada X Grupo Frontera	March 4, 2023	152	5	
"Lovezinho"	Treyce	March 4, 2023	160	2	
"Cupido"	Tini	March 4, 2023	69	13	
"TQG"	Karol G x Shakira	March 11, 2023	1	55	
"Tormenta"	Gorillaz feat. Bad Bunny	March 11, 2023	33	4	
"Mientras Me Curo del Cora"	Karol G	March 11, 2023	40	13	
"Pero Tú"	Karol G & Quevedo	March 11, 2023	69	3	
"Tus Gafitas"	Karol G	March 11, 2023	70	2	
"Gucci Los Paños"	Karol G	March 11, 2023	90	1	
"Mañana Será Bonito"	Karol G & Carla Morrison	March 11, 2023	98	3	
"Besties"	Karol G	March 11, 2023	118	1	
"Por Las Noches"	Peso Pluma	March 11, 2023	14	30	
"Ojos Ferrari"	Karol G, Justin Quiles & Ángel Dior	March 11, 2023	156	1	
"Karmika"	Karol G, Bad Gyal & Sean Paul	March 11, 2023	169	1	
"En La Intimidad"	Emilia X Big One X Callejero Fino	March 11, 2023	171	4	
"La Bebé"	Yng Lvcas x Peso Pluma	March 11, 2023	2	62	
"Nosso Quadro"	Ana Castela	March 11, 2023	95	15	
"Shorty Party"	Cartel de Santa feat. La Kelly	March 18, 2023	25	11	
"Más Rica Que Ayer"	Anuel AA, Mambo Kingz and DJ Luian	March 18, 2023	93	4	
"El Merengue"	Marshmello & Manuel Turizo	March 25, 2023	103	26	
"Rara Vez"	Milo J	March 25, 2023	98	9	
"El Azul"	Junior H x Peso Pluma	March 25, 2023	23	30	
"Malas Decisiones"	Kenia Os	March 25, 2023	176	1	
"Ella Baila Sola"	Eslabón Armado X Peso Pluma	April 1, 2023	1	50	
"Coco Chanel"	Eladio Carrión & Bad Bunny	April 1, 2023	22	19	
"Si La Calle Llama"	Eladio Carrión feat. Myke Towers	April 1, 2023	89	1	
"Remix Exclusivo"	Feid	April 1, 2023	102	4	
"Dijeron Que No La Iba Lograr"	Chinito Pacas X Fuerza Regida	April 1, 2023	108	4	
"Mbappé"	Eladio Carrión	April 1, 2023	174	1	
"Beso"	Rosalía & Rauw Alejandro	April 8, 2023	10	26	
"Bzrp Music Sessions, Vol. 54"	Bizarrap & Arcángel	April 8, 2023	30	3	
"Vampiros"	Rosalía & Rauw Alejandro	April 8, 2023	163	1	
"Classy 101"	Feid x Young Miko	April 15, 2023	17	48	
"M.A (Mejores Amigos)"	BM	April 22, 2023	81	8	
"Chanel"	Becky G & Peso Pluma	April 22, 2023	46	11	
"Un Finde Crossover #2"	Ke Personajes X Big One X FMK	April 22, 2023	84	11	
"Un x100to"	Grupo Frontera X Bad Bunny	April 29, 2023	1	46	
"Igualito a Mi Apá"	Fuerza Regida & Peso Pluma	April 29, 2023	118	7	
"Frágil"	Yahritza y Su Esencia x Grupo Frontera	April 29, 2023	37	22	
"El Tsurito"	Junior H x Gabito Ballesteros x Peso Pluma	April 29, 2023	127	3	
"Las Morras"	Peso Pluma & Blessd	May 6, 2023	97	8	
"Rosa Pastel"	Peso Pluma & Jasiel Núñez	May 6, 2023	123	4	
"Niña Bonita"	Feid & Sean Paul	May 6, 2023	136	4	
"Erro Gostoso"	Simone Mendes	May 13, 2023	192	1	
"Mejor Que Yo"	Anuel AA, DJ Luian and Mambo Kingz	May 20, 2023	72	2	
"Acróstico"	Shakira	May 27, 2023	12	8	
"Abcdario"	Edén Muñoz X Junior H	May 27, 2023	84	4	
"Where She Goes"	Bad Bunny	June 3, 2023	1	26	
"TQM"	Fuerza Regida	June 3, 2023	15	21	
"Amargura"	Karol G	June 3, 2023	71	67	
"Cartão Black"	MC Caverinha E KayBlack	June 3, 2023	182	1	
"Danza Kuduro"	Don Omar & Lucenzo	June 3, 2023	75	74*	
"Bye"	Peso Pluma	June 10, 2023	45	10	
"Bzrp Music Sessions, Vol. 55"	Bizarrap & Peso Pluma	June 10, 2023	2	15	
"Los del Espacio"	LIT Killah, María Becerra, FMK, Rusherking, Duki, Emilia, Tiago pzk & Big One	June 17, 2023	38	17	
"Tá OK"	Dennis e Kevin O Chris, Maluma & Karol G	June 17, 2023	38	19	
"El Cielo"	Sky Rompiendo, Feid & Myke Towers	June 17, 2023	47	8	
"Polaris"	Saiko, Feid & Quevedo feat. Mora	June 24, 2023	122	1	
"Plebada"	El Alfa x Peso Pluma	June 24, 2023	129	3	
"Tuya"	Rosalía	June 24, 2023	139	1	
"Yankee 150"	Yandel, Feid & Daddy Yankee	July 1, 2023	177	1	
"Lady Gaga"	Peso Pluma, Gabito Ballesteros & Junior H	July 8, 2023	13	38	
"Sabor Fresa"	Fuerza Regida	July 8, 2023	16	25	
"Luna"	Peso Pluma & Junior H	July 8, 2023	23	5	
"Bzrp Music Sessions, Vol. 56"	Bizarrap & Rauw Alejandro	July 8, 2023	32	3	
"VVS"	Peso Pluma, Edgardo Núñez & Los Dareyes de la Sierra	July 8, 2023	72	1	
"Baby Hello"	Rauw Alejandro X Bizarrap	July 8, 2023	99	5	
"Rubicón"	Peso Pluma	July 8, 2023	114	13	
"Lagunas"	Peso Pluma & Jasiel Núñez	July 8, 2023	109	15	
"Carnal"	Peso Pluma & Natanael Cano	July 8, 2023	157	1	
"Corazón Vacío"	María Becerra	July 8, 2023	111	7	
"Nueva Vida"	Peso Pluma	July 8, 2023	172	1	
"Mojabi Ghost"	Tainy & Bad Bunny	July 15, 2023	23	12	
"Tulum"	Peso Pluma & Grupo Frontera	July 15, 2023	25	19	
"LaLa"	Myke Towers	July 15, 2023	3	38	
"Copa Vacía"	Shakira X Manuel Turizo	July 15, 2023	55	2	
"Mi Bello Ángel"	Natanael Cano	July 15, 2023	100	4	
"Pasiempre"	Tainy, Arcángel & Jhayco feat. Myke Towers, Omar Courtz & Arca	July 15, 2023	122	1	
"Primera Cita"	Carín León	July 15, 2023	28	38	
"Vagabundo"	Sebastián Yatra, Manuel Turizo & Beéle	July 15, 2023	167	7	
"Columbia"	Quevedo	July 22, 2023	17	31	
"S91"	Karol G	July 29, 2023	43	10	
"Quema"	Ryan Castro x Peso Pluma	July 29, 2023	101	3	
"Novidade Na Área"	MC Livinho & DJ Matt D	July 29, 2023	196	1	
"Pacto"	Jay Wheeler x Anuel AA x Hades66 x Dei V x Bryant Myers	August 12, 2023	168	1	
"Chulo pt. 2"	Bad Gyal, Tokischa & Young Miko	August 12, 2023	89	12	
"Halls Na Língua"	Kadu Martins	August 12, 2023	155	3	
"El Amor de Su Vida"	Grupo Frontera & Grupo Firme	August 19, 2023	38	47	
"Faz Um Vuk Vuk (Teto Espelhado)"	Kevin O Chris & DJ Nk Da Serra	August 19, 2023	118	5	
"Mi Ex Tenía Razón"	Karol G	August 26, 2023	13	32	
"Qlona"	Karol G & Peso Pluma	August 26, 2023	7	61	
"Una Noche En Medellín (Remix)"	Karol G, Cris Mj & Ryan Castro	August 26, 2023	68	3	
"Oki Doki"	Karol G	August 26, 2023	131	2	
"Holanda"	Jhayco	August 26, 2023	54	11	
"Dispo"	Karol G & Young Miko	August 26, 2023	174	1	
"Qué Onda"	Calle 24 x Chino Pacas x Fuerza Regida	September 16, 2023	26	36	
"Reina"	Mora & Saiko	September 16, 2023	149	1	
"¿Dónde Se Aprende A Querer?"	Mora	September 16, 2023	156	1	
"Elovrga"	Alex Favela x Grupo Marca Registrada x Joaquín Medina	September 16, 2023	82	14	
"Bipolar"	Peso Pluma x Jasiel Núñez x Junior H	September 23, 2023	86	4	
"Chico"	Luísa Sonza	September 23, 2023	163	1	
"Según Quién"	Maluma & Carín León	September 30, 2023	17	43	
"Let's Go 4"	DJ GBR, MC IG, MC Ryan SP, MC PH, MC Davi, MC Luki, MC Don Juan, MC Kadu, Traplaudo, MC GP & MC GH Do 7	September 30, 2023	158	2	
"CCC"	Michelle Maciel x Edén Muñoz	September 30, 2023	132	5	
"El Jefe"	Shakira X Fuerza Regida	October 7, 2023	24	3	
"Un Preview"	Bad Bunny	October 7, 2023	13	9	
"Buenas"	Quevedo & Saiko	October 7, 2023	163	1	
"Si No Estás"	Iñigo Quintero	October 14, 2023	5	26	
"Luces de Tecno"	Feid	October 14, 2023	199	1	
"Bzrp Music Sessions, Vol. 57"	Bizarrap & Milo J	October 21, 2023	31	4	
"Y Lloro"	Junior H	October 21, 2023	77	37	
"Fruto"	Bizarrap & Milo J	October 21, 2023	106	3	
"$ad Boyz II"	Junior H	October 21, 2023	169	1	
"Lollipop"	Darell	October 21, 2023	34	19	
"Monaco"	Bad Bunny	October 28, 2023	1	27	
"Perro Negro"	Bad Bunny & Feid	October 28, 2023	4	39	
"Fina"	Bad Bunny & Young Miko	October 28, 2023	6	6	
"Hibiki"	Bad Bunny & Mora	October 28, 2023	11	4	
"Nadie Sabe"	Bad Bunny	October 28, 2023	12	2	
"Baby Nueva"	Bad Bunny	October 28, 2023	15	3	
"Seda"	Bad Bunny & Bryant Myers	October 28, 2023	16	3	
"Teléfono Nuevo"	Bad Bunny & Luar La L	October 28, 2023	18	2	
"Mr. October"	Bad Bunny	October 28, 2023	19	2	
"Cybertruck"	Bad Bunny	October 28, 2023	25	2	
"Gracias Por Nada"	Bad Bunny	October 28, 2023	28	2	
"Mercedes Carota"	Bad Bunny & YOVNGCHIMI	October 28, 2023	35	2	
"Vou 787"	Bad Bunny	October 28, 2023	36	1	
"Los Pits"	Bad Bunny	October 28, 2023	41	2	
"Acho PR"	Bad Bunny, Arcángel, De La Ghetto & Ñengo Flow	October 28, 2023	47	1	
"No Me Quiero Casar"	Bad Bunny	October 28, 2023	48	2	
"Thunder y Lightning"	Bad Bunny & Eladio Carrión	October 28, 2023	49	2	
"Vuelve Candy B"	Bad Bunny	October 28, 2023	57	1	
"Baticano"	Bad Bunny	October 28, 2023	59	1	
"Lou Lou"	Gabito Ballesteros X Natanael Cano	November 4, 2023	76	10	
"Harley Quinn"	Fuerza Regida & Marshmello	November 11, 2023	14	24	
"Reggaeton Champagne"	Bellakath & Dani Flow	November 11, 2023	124	11	
"La_Original.Mp3"	Emilia & Tini	November 18, 2023	170	1	
"Daqui Pra Sempre"	Manu & Simone Mendes	November 18, 2023	136	4	
"Diluvio"	Rauw Alejandro	November 25, 2023	95	15	
"La People"	Peso Pluma & Tito Double P	December 2, 2023	164	5	
"Labios Mordidos"	Kali Uchis & Karol G	December 9, 2023	108	1	
"La Víctima"	Xavi	December 16, 2023	10	23	
"La Diabla"	Xavi	December 23, 2023	3	28	
"Luna"	Feid & ATL Jacob	December 23, 2023	12	74	
"Bellakeo"	Peso Pluma & Anitta	December 23, 2023	7	22	
"Ando"	Jere Klein	December 30, 2023	75	14	

== Spanish-language songs on the Billboard Hot 100 ==
The Billboard Hot 100 ranks the most-played songs in the United States based on sales (physical and digital), radio play, and online streaming. Also included are certifications awarded by the Recording Industry Association of America (RIAA) based on digital downloads and on-demand audio and/or video song streams: gold certification is awarded for sales of 500,000 copies, platinum for one million units, and multi-platinum for two million units, and following in increments of one million thereafter. The RIAA also awards Spanish-language songs under the Latin certification: Disco de Oro (Gold) is awarded for sales 30,000 certification copies, Disco de Platino (Platinum) for 60,000 units, and Disco de Multi-Platino (Multi-Platinum) for 120,000 units, and following in increments of 60,000 thereafter.

Song	Performer(s)	Entry	Peak	Weeks	RIAA certification	Ref.
2017 entries
"Feliz Navidad"	José Feliciano	January 7, 2017	6	43		
2022 entries
"La Bachata"	Manuel Turizo	September 3, 2022	67	21	22× Platinum (Latin)	
"Gatúbela"	Karol G X Maldy	September 10, 2022	37	11	13× Platinum (Latin)	
"No Se Va"	Grupo Frontera	October 8, 2022	57	20		
"Monotonía"	Shakira + Ozuna	November 5, 2022	65	3	16× Platinum (Latin)	
"La Jumpa"	Arcángel & Bad Bunny	December 17, 2022	68	10		
2023 entries
"Gato de Noche"	Ñengo Flow & Bad Bunny	January 7, 2023	60	8		
"Que Vuelvas"	Carín León X Grupo Frontera	January 7, 2023	50	20	28× Platinum (Latin)	
"Bebé Dame"	Fuerza Regida X Grupo Frontera	January 7, 2023	25	20		
"Bzrp Music Sessions, Vol. 53"	Bizarrap & Shakira	January 28, 2023	9	15	Gold	
"AMG"	Gabito Ballesteros, Peso Pluma & Natanael Cano	February 4, 2023	37	20	7× Platinum (Latin)	
"Fin de Semana"	Junior H X Óscar Maydon	February 11, 2023	86	2		
"Hey Mor"	Ozuna feat. Feid	February 11, 2023	85	4		
"X Si Volvemos"	Karol G x Romeo Santos	February 18, 2023	48	6	Gold (Latin)	
"PRC"	Peso Pluma X Natanael Cano	February 18, 2023	33	20	4× Platinum (Latin)	
"Yandel 150"	Yandel & Feid	February 18, 2023	71	17	3× Platinum (Latin)	
"TQG"	Karol G x Shakira	March 11, 2023	7	20		
"Mientras Me Curo del Cora"	Karol G	March 11, 2023	68	1		
"Gucci Los Paños"	Karol G	March 11, 2023	71	1		
"Tus Gafitas"	Karol G	March 11, 2023	73	1		
"Cairo"	Karol G & Ovy On The Drums	March 11, 2023	82	1	4× Platinum (Latin)	
"Pero Tú"	Karol G & Quevedo	March 11, 2023	86	1	9× Platinum (Latin)	
"Ojos Ferrari"	Karol G, Justin Quiles & Ángel Dior	March 11, 2023	95	1		
"Besties"	Karol G	March 11, 2023	96	1		
"Mañana Será Bonito"	Karol G & Carla Morrison	March 11, 2023	98	1	9× Platinum (Latin)	
"Por Las Noches"	Peso Pluma	March 25, 2023	28	20		
"Ella Baila Sola"	Eslabón Armado X Peso Pluma	April 1, 2023	4	23	21× Platinum (Latin)	
"La Bebé"	Yng Lvcas x Peso Pluma	April 1, 2023	11	23	13× Platinum (Latin)	
"El Gordo Trae El Mando"	Chino Pacas	April 1, 2023	58	13		
"Coco Chanel"	Eladio Carrión & Bad Bunny	April 1, 2023	87	2		
"Beso"	Rosalía & Rauw Alejandro	April 8, 2023	52	12	Platinum	
"Ch y la Pizza"	Fuerza Regida X Natanael Cano	April 8, 2023	68	9		
"El Azul"	Junior H x Peso Pluma	April 22, 2023	55	16	13× Platinum (Latin)	
"Un x100to"	Grupo Frontera X Bad Bunny	April 29, 2023	5	20		
"Chanel"	Becky G & Peso Pluma	April 29, 2023	55	10	Platinum; 15× Platinum (Latin)	
"Igualito a Mi Apá"	Fuerza Regida & Peso Pluma	April 29, 2023	80	6		
"Di Que Sí"	Grupo Marca Registrada X Grupo Frontera	April 29, 2023	89	3		
"Frágil"	Yahritza y Su Esencia x Grupo Frontera	May 6, 2023	69	16	Platinum (Latin)	
"Mejor Que Yo"	Anuel AA, DJ Luian and Mambo Kingz	May 20, 2023	83	1		
"Acróstico"	Shakira	May 27, 2023	84	1	4× Platinum (Latin)	
"Where She Goes"	Bad Bunny	June 3, 2023	8	20		
"TQM"	Fuerza Regida	June 3, 2023	34	17	37× Platinum (Latin)	
"Bye"	Peso Pluma	June 10, 2023	48	9		
"Bzrp Music Sessions, Vol. 55"	Bizarrap & Peso Pluma	June 17, 2023	31	10	28× Platinum (Latin)	
"Plebada"	El Alfa x Peso Pluma	June 24, 2023	68	2		
"Classy 101"	Feid x Young Miko	July 1, 2023	99	1	19× Platinum (Latin)	
"Sabor Fresa"	Fuerza Regida	July 8, 2023	26	16	37× Platinum (Latin)	
"Luna"	Peso Pluma & Junior H	July 8, 2023	30	5		
"Lady Gaga"	Peso Pluma, Gabito Ballesteros & Junior H	July 8, 2023	35	20	5× Diamond (Latin)	
"VVS"	Peso Pluma, Edgardo Núñez & Los Dareyes de la Sierra	July 8, 2023	54	1		
"Rubicón"	Peso Pluma	July 8, 2023	63	12		
"Nueva Vida"	Peso Pluma	July 8, 2023	86	1		
"Lagunas"	Peso Pluma & Jasiel Núñez	July 8, 2023	77	9	31× Platinum (Latin)	
"Rosa Pastel"	Peso Pluma & Jasiel Núñez	July 8, 2023	93	1	11× Platinum (Latin)	
"Tulum"	Peso Pluma & Grupo Frontera	July 15, 2023	43	14		
"Mojabi Ghost"	Tainy & Bad Bunny	July 15, 2023	57	3		
"LaLa"	Myke Towers	July 22, 2023	43	20	31× Platinum (Latin)	
"S91"	Karol G	July 29, 2023	45	6		
"Quema"	Ryan Castro x Peso Pluma	July 29, 2023	92	1	17×Platinum (Latin)	
"Aquí Te Espero"	Iván Cornejo	August 12, 2023	89	1		
"El Amor de Su Vida"	Grupo Frontera & Grupo Firme	August 19, 2023	67	20		
"Mi Ex Tenía Razón"	Karol G	August 26, 2023	22	16		
"Qlona"	Karol G & Peso Pluma	August 26, 2023	28	21		
"Una Noche En Medellín (Remix)"	Karol G, Cris Mj & Ryan Castro	August 26, 2023	68	1		
"Oki Doki"	Karol G	August 26, 2023	83	1		
"Amargura"	Karol G	August 26, 2023	85	6		
"Primera Cita"	Carín León	September 9, 2023	97	2		
"Qué Onda"	Calle 24 x Chino Pacas x Fuerza Regida	September 16, 2023	61	19	10× Platinum (Latin)	
"Bipolar"	Peso Pluma x Jasiel Núñez x Junior H	September 23, 2023	60	4		
"El Jefe"	Shakira X Fuerza Regida	October 7, 2023	55	1	Platinum (Latin)	
"Un Preview"	Bad Bunny	October 7, 2023	43	7		
"Según Quién"	Maluma & Carín León	October 7, 2023	65	17	13× Platinum (Latin)	
"Y Lloro"	Junior H	October 21, 2023	79	7		
"Monaco"	Bad Bunny	October 28, 2023	5	21		
"Fina"	Bad Bunny & Young Miko	October 28, 2023	14	4		
"Perro Negro"	Bad Bunny & Feid	October 28, 2023	20	20		
"Nadie Sabe"	Bad Bunny	October 28, 2023	22	1		
"Hibiki"	Bad Bunny & Mora	October 28, 2023	24	2		
"Mr. October"	Bad Bunny	October 28, 2023	28	2		
"Cybertruck"	Bad Bunny	October 28, 2023	30	2		
"Teléfono Nuevo"	Bad Bunny & Luar La L	October 28, 2023	32	2		
"Baby Nueva"	Bad Bunny	October 28, 2023	34	2		
"Seda"	Bad Bunny & Bryant Myers	October 28, 2023	38	2		
"Gracias Por Nada"	Bad Bunny	October 28, 2023	52	1		
"Vou 787"	Bad Bunny	October 28, 2023	53	1		
"Mercedes Carota"	Bad Bunny & YOVNGCHIMI	October 28, 2023	57	1		
"Los Pits"	Bad Bunny	October 28, 2023	61	1		
"No Me Quiero Casar"	Bad Bunny	October 28, 2023	65	1		
"Vuelve Candy B"	Bad Bunny	October 28, 2023	70	1		
"Baticano"	Bad Bunny	October 28, 2023	78	1		
"Thunder y Lightning"	Bad Bunny & Eladio Carrión	October 28, 2023	80	1		
"Acho PR"	Bad Bunny, Arcángel, De La Ghetto & Ñengo Flow	October 28, 2023	83	1		
"Harley Quinn"	Fuerza Regida & Marshmello	November 18, 2023	40	20	27× Platinum (Latin)	
"Labios Mordidos"	Kali Uchis & Karol G	December 9, 2023	97	1		
"Bellakeo"	Peso Pluma & Anitta	December 30, 2023	53	14	38× Platinum (Latin)	
"La Diabla"	Xavi	December 30, 2023	20	20	25× Platinum (Latin)	
"La Víctima"	Xavi	December 30, 2023	46	15	18× Platinum (Latin)	

== Albums released ==
The following is a list of notable Latin albums (music performed in Spanish or Portuguese) (Note: In the United States, Billboard and the RIAA recognizes an album as "Latin" if 51% or more of its content is sung in the Spanish language. The Latin Recording Academy extends this definition of "Latin music" to include Portuguese-language records as well as other languages and dialects of Ibero-America such as Catalan, Nahuatl, Quechua, Galician, Valencia, and Mayan. The Latin Recording Academy also includes Latin instrumental recordings performed by Ibero-American musicians. Note that Spain and Portugal are included under this definition of Ibero-America.) that have been released in Latin America, Spain, Portugal, or the United States in 2023.

=== First quarter ===
==== January ====
Day	Title	Artist	Genre(s)	Singles	Label
12	Aquí y Ahora	Delaporte			
13	Resistencia	Yandel	Reggaeton	"Yandel 150"	Sony Music Latin
19	Hombre Absurdo	Gregorio Uribe	Vallenato		Independent
20	Donde Quiero Estar	Quevedo	Reggaeton	"Sin Señal"; "Vista al Mar"; "Punto G"; "Playa del Inglés"	Taste the Floor
30	Não Me Espere na Estação	Lô Borges	Alternative		Deck

==== February ====
Day	Title	Artist	Genre(s)	Singles	Label
3	Afro-Cuban Dances	Kristhyan Benitez	Classical		Steinway & Sons
8	Noitada	Pabllo Vittar	Pop	"Descontrolado"; "Ameianoite"	Sony Music Brazil
9	Nueve	Santiago Cruz	Singer-songwriter		Santiago Cruz
10	Canciones del Corazón	Olga Tañón	Salsa		ONErpm
16	Cupido	Tini	Pop	"Miénteme"; "Maldita Foto"; "Bar"; "Fantasi"; "La Triple T"; "Carne y Hueso"; "La Loto"; "El Último Beso"; "Muñecas"; "Cupido"	Sony Music Latin
16	Esta Vida Que Elegí	St. Pedro			
17	Sincerándome	Carlos Rivera	Latin pop		
24	Mañana Será Bonito	Karol G	Reggaeton	"Provenza"; "Gatúbela"; "Cairo"; "X Si Volvemos"; "TQG"; "Mientras Me Curo del Cora"; "Amargura"	Universal Latino

==== March ====
Day	Title	Artist	Genre(s)	Singles	Label
1	Leche de Tigre	Diamante Eléctrico	Latin rock		Diamante Eléctrico
3	Caribe Caribe	La Vida Bohème	Alternative		Warner Chappell Mexico
3	As Palavras, Vol. 1 & 2	Rubel	Pop		Dorileo E Coala
3	Portuguesa	Carminho	Fado		Warner Music Portugal
7	El Día Antes del Día	Sie7e			
8	Vem Doce	Vanessa da Mata	MPB		VDM
10	Trinchera Pop	Iván Ferreiro	Indie Pop		Warner Music Spain
10	El Vallenato Se Hizo en el Cielo	Gilberto Daza & Sergio Luis Rodríguez	Latin Christian		Creation Music Group
17	3men2 Kbrn	Eladio Carrión	Trap	"Mbappe"; "Air Frace"	Rimas
17	Operation Tango	Quinteto Astor Piazzolla	Tango		E54music
17	Por la Tangente	Diego Guerrero	Flamenco		Diego Guerrero Sánchez
17	2000	Manuel Turizo	Urbano	"La Bachata"	
18	Solar	Vanessa Moreno			Independent
23	La Vida Es Una	Myke Towers	Reggaeton	"Aquardiente"	One World; Warner Latina
24	Bellodrama	Ana Mena	Pop	"Música Ligera"; "Las 12"; "Un Clásico"	Sony Spain
24	RR	Rosalía & Rauw Alejandro	Reggaeton	"Beso"	Columbia; Duars; Sony Latin
24	Vilã	Ludmilla	Pop; trap; funk carioca	"Socadona"; "Nasci pra Vencer" / "Sou Má"	Warner Brazil
24	Niche Sinfónico	Grupo Niche & National Symphony Orchestra of Colombia	Salsa		PPM
30	30 Anos Vol 1	Aline Barros	Latin Christian		Sony Music
30	Raiz	João Gomes	Brazilian roots		Believe Music
31	De La Tierra III	De La Tierra	Rock		Sony Music Latin
31	Hay Niveles	Los Rieleros del Norte	Norteño		Fonovisa

=== Second quarter ===
==== April ====
Day	Title	Artist	Genre(s)	Singles	Label
7	11:11	Paula Fernandes	Sertanejo; Country pop		Universal Music Brazil
7	Preto No Branco Vertical	Preto No Branco	Latin Christian		KMJ Comunicação
11	Novo Tempo	Casa Worship	Latin Christian		Casa Music
13	Lali	Lali	Pop	"Disciplina"; "Diva"; "Como Tú"; "N5"; "2 Son 3"; "Motiveishon"; "Cómprame un Brishito"; "Obsesión"	Sony Music Argentina
13	Cambios	Willy García	Salsa		L Y L
14	El Dragón	Lola Índigo	Pop	"Las Solteras"; "An1mal"; "Discoteka"; "Corazones Rotos"; "La Santa"; "El Tonto"; "Turismo"	Universal Music Spain
14	Flying Chicken	Hamilton de Holanda featuring Thiago Rabello & Salomão Soares	Latin jazz		Sony Music Brasil
14	Único	Fernandinho	Faz Chover		Sony Music Brasil
14	Único	Fernandinho	Faz Chover		Sony Music Brasil
14	Sempiterno	Hozwal	Reggaeton, Trap	"Twerk" "Big Booty"	SJ Records
16	Hazme Caminar	Jesús Israel	Latin Christian		Colibrí Music
18	Escalona Nunca Se Había Grabado Así	Carlos Vives	Vallenato		WK Records, Gaira Musica Local
18	Voy a Ti	Luis Figueroa	Salsa		Sony Music Latin, Magnus Media
19	Hotel Miranda!	Miranda!	Latin pop	""Don"; "Navidad"; "Yo Te Diré"; "Uno los Dos"; "Prisionero"; "Perfecta""	Sony Music Argentina
21	Toda la Vida, un Día	Sílvia Pérez Cruz	Folk	"Toda la vida, un día"; "Nombrar es imposible"; "La flor"; "Sin"	Sony Music Spain
21	Tierra, Songs By Cuban Women	Estrella Acosta	Traditional tropical		eStar
21	Lo Que Vemos	Marcos Vidal	Latin Christian		Heaven Music
22	Catarsis	Daniela Darcourt	Salsa		Independent
25	Sólo D’Lira	Molotov	Rock		Sony Music Spain
25	Emociones 1.5	Jay Wheeler	Urbano		
26	Cuatro26	Manny Cruz	Merengue		La Oreja Media
26	Relicário: João Gilberto (Ao Vivo no Sesc 1998)	João Gilberto	Bossa nova		Selo Sesc
27	Vício Inerente	Marina Sena	Pop	"Tudo Pra Amar Você"; "Olho no Gato"	Sony Music Brazil
27	Desvelado	Eslabon Armado	Regional Mexican	"Ella Baila Sola"; "Quédate Conmigo"	DEL Records
27	Bolero Apocalíptico	Monsieur Periné	Latin alternative		5020, Sony Music Mexico
27	Contigo	Mike Bahía	Contemporary tropical		Warner Music México
27	Nós	Eli Soares	Latin Christian		Universal Music Christian
27	Albéniz & Granados Piano Works	Luis López	Classical		Anaga Classics
27	Selva	Rafa Pabón			
28	Xtassy	Akapellah	Urbano		O.B.G
28	Sólo Muere Si Se Olvida	Adriel Favela	Ranchera, mariachi		Fonovisa
28	El Patrón	Jay Perez	Tejano		M Music
28	Argentinxs	Tanghetto	Tango		Constitution
28	Camino	Niña Pastori	Flamenco		Sony Music España
28	Colcha de Retazos	Maria Mulata	Children's music		Sony Music España
28	Thalia's Mixtape	Thalía	Latin pop	"Para No Verte Más"	Sony Music Latin

==== May ====
Day	Title	Artist	Genre(s)	Singles	Label
5	Bordado a Mano	Ana Bárbara	Ranchera, mariachi		Ana Bárbara
5	Hecho en México...Mágico	Banda El Recodo de Cruz Lizárraga	Ranchera, mariachi		Fonovisa
5	Para Empezar a Amar	Juan Treviño	Tejano		Fonovisa
5	Argentinxs	Tanghetto	Tango		Fonovisa
5	X Mí (Vol. 1)	Gaby Moreno	Latin pop		
5	BOOEEE	Marconi Impara	Reggaeton, Trap		Rimas Entertainment
11	Despídeme de Todxs	Juan Pablo Vega	Pop rock		Warner Music México
11	Fuera de Serie	La Energía Norteña	Norteño		Warner Music México
12	Cowboys de la A3	Arde Bogotá	Rock		Sony Music España
12	Vida	Omara Portuondo	Traditional tropical		One World
12	Negra Ópera	Martinho Da Vila	Samba		Sony Music Brasil
12	Daniel 40 Anos Celebra João Paulo & Daniel	Daniel	Sertanejo		Onerpm
12	Vox Humana	Bobby Sanabria Multiverse Big Band	Latin jazz		
12	Don't Stop The Magic	Grupo Marca Registrada	Regional Mexican		
15	Bembé	Iván "Melon" Lewis & The Cuban Swing Express	Latin jazz		Cezanne
16	El Cielo Aún Espera	Jesús Adrián Romero	Latin Christian		Vástago
18	Alma	Nicki Nicole	Trap	"No Voy a Llorar"; "Qué Le Pasa Conmigo?"; "Dispara ***"; "8 AM"	Dale Play
18	Colmillo de Leche	Carin León	Norteño		Socios Music
19	Vida Cotidiana	Juanes		"Amores prohibidos"; "Gris"; "Ojalá"; "Veneno"; "Cecilia"	Universal Music Latino
19	Los Mejores Años	Joaquina	Singer-songwriter		Universal Music Latino
19	Family & Friends	La Abuela Irma Silva	Norteño		CHR
19	Vida	Alex Campos	Latin Christian		Mv
19	Ao Vivo no Radio City Music Hall Nova Iorque	Chitãozinho & Xororó	Sertanejo		
19	Canto a la Imaginación	Marina Tuset			Independent
19	Amor Como en las Películas de Antes	Lupita Infante	Regional Mexican		
19	Mimy & Tony	Tony Succar, Mimy Succa	Tropical		
21	PRISMARAMA	León Larregui	Rock		Universal Music Mexico
22	¿Y Si Pido Que Me Cuentes?	Veleta Roja	Children's music		Veleta Roja
23	Natural	Soledad			
24	Décimo Cuarto	Andrés Cepeda	Latin pop		Sony Music Latin
24	Mamá Cumbé	Tato Marenco	Folk		Tm Entertainmen
24	La Reina del Sur	La Zowi	Urbano		La Vendicion Records
24	Santurcinos	Gigolo y La Exce	Reggaeton, Trap	"Nocion" "Lo Que Tu Digas"	Rimas Entertainment
25	O Último Romântico Online	Xamã	Trap	"Puto de Luxo"	Sony Music Brazil
25	5:10am	Luis Fernando Borjas	Contemporary tropical		CAE Group
25	Proyecto Insomnio	Super Heroes de Blanco	Tejano		
25	Pura Sangre	Israel Fernández	Flamenco		
25	Decretos Reais	Marília Mendonça	Sertanejo		Som Livre
25	Six Jewels 23	Yng Lvcas	Reggaeton		
26	El Diablo en el Cuerpo	Alex Anwandter	Pop	"Maricoteca"; "Qué piensas hacer sin mi amor?"; "Precipicio"; "Mi vida en llamas"; "Unx de nosotrxs"	5 AM
26	Greta Garbo	Bunbury	Singer-Songwriter	"Invulnerables"; "Alaska"	Warner Music Spain
26	Beautiful Humans, Vol. 1	AleMor	Latin pop		Wizzmor
26	Martínez	Cabra	Latin alternative		La Casa Del Sombrero
26	Tour Sinfónico En Vivo Auditorio Nacional	Sonora Santanera	Traditional tropical		La Casa Del Sombrero
26	En Tiempo de Son... Homenaje a las Canciones de: Jorge Luis Piloto	Septeto Acarey de Reynier Pérez	Traditional tropical		La Casa Del Sombrero
26	1500 Pedas	La Adictiva	Banda		Anval Music
26	Ganas	Vilax	Tejano		Anval Music
26	The Chick Corea Symphony Tribute. Ritmo	ADDA Simfònica, Josep Vicent, and Emilio Solla	Instrumental		Warner Music Spain
26	Romance al Campesino Porteño	Miguel Zenón, José A. Zayas Cabán, Ryan Smith & Casey Rafn	Instrumental		Warner Music Spain
26	Reencuentro	Susana Rinaldi and Osvaldo Piro	Tango		Epsa Music
26	Semblanzas	William Maestre Big Band	Jazz		Universidad El Bosque
26	Ganas	Vilax	Tejano		Fonovisa
28	A Ciegas	Paula Arenas	Pop	"Un Día a la Vez"; "Déjame Llorarte"; "A Ciegas"	Do Re Millions
29	Tripolar	Usted Señálemelo	Rock		Sony Music Chile
29	El Equilibrista	Juan Carlos Pérez Soto	Singer-songwriter		Blue Dog Music
29	Forajido 2	Christian Nodal	Ranchera	"Por el Resto de Tu Vida"; "Un Cumbión Dolido"; "Quédate"	Sony Music Latin
29	Tres	Renesito Avich	Instrumental		My Cuban Music
30	EADDA9223	Fito Páez	Rock	"Brillante Sobre el Mic"	Sony Music
30	A Mi Manera	Sergio Vargas	Merengue		J&N
31	Trópico, Vol. 2	Pavel Núñez	Merengue		La Oreja Media
31	Danzoneando (En vivo desde Matanzas)	Orquesta Failde	Traditional tropical		La Oreja Media
31	Otro Color	Ilegales	Contemporary tropical		Otro Color
31	Aguajes de Mar y Manglar	Cantares del Pacífico	Folk		Chaco World Music

==== June ====
Day	Title	Artist	Genre(s)	Singles	Label
14	Iboru	Marcelo D2	Samba		Pupila Dilatada, Altafonte
16	Forever King	Don Omar	Reggaeton	"Podemos Repetirlo"; "Bandidos"; "Flow HP"; "Sincero"; "Good Girl"; "Soy Yo"; "Se Menea"; "Let's Get Crazy (Mambo Drop)"	Saban Music Latin
16	El Final de las Cosas	Barbi Recanati	Rock	"Fin del Mundo"; "Lo Que Queda"	Goza Records
16	Pánico	Vico C	Hip Hop	"Pregúntale a Tu Papá por Mí"; "Ella Va"	Nain Music
16	Leyenda Viva	6ix9ine	Reggaeton	"Bori"; "Wapae"; "Y Ahora"; "Pa Ti"; "Dueño"	La Corporación
19	Data	Tainy	Reggaeton	"Lo Siento BB:/"; "Sci-Fi"; "Obstáculo"; "Fantasma | AVC"; "La Baby"	NEON16
22	Génesis	Peso Pluma	Corrido	"Rosa Pastel"; "77"; "Bye"	Double P
22	Antes de Ameri	Duki	Trap	"Harakiri"; "Apollo 13"; "Rockstar 2.0"; "Don't Lie"	Dale Play
23	No Tempo da Intolerância	Elza Soares	MPB		Deck
24	Dembow Worldwide Hits Teteo 42	El Alfa	Urbano		
26	Vamos Al Zoo	Danilo & Chapis	Children's music		Moon Moosic
26	Aventuras	Flor Bromley	Children's music		Independent
30	Nata Montana	Natanael Cano	Regional Mexican	"AMG"; "Como Es Arriba Es Abajo"; "Pacas De Billetes"	WEA Latina
30	Misión Cumplida	Jenni Rivera (posthumously)	Banda	"Aparentemente Bien"; "Engañémoslo"; "Quisieran Tener Mi Lugar"; "Motivos"; "Misión Cumplida"	Sony Music Latin

=== Third quarter ===
==== July ====
Day	Title	Artist	Genre(s)	Singles	Label
7	Playa Saturno	Rauw Alejandro	Reggaeton	"Baby Hello"; "Si Te Pegas"	Sony Latin
7	Súper Terror	Él Mató a un Policía Motorizado	Pop	"Tantas Cosas Buenas"; "Medalla de Oro"; "Diamante Rojo"; "El Universo"	El Mató a un Policía Motorizado
14	Searching For a Memory (Busco Tu Recuerdo)	Sammy Figueroa featuring Gonzalo Rubalcaba and Aymée Nuviola	Latin jazz		Ashe
14	No yo, sino Cristo	Majo y Dan	Christian		Ashe
16	Siembra: 45° Aniversario (En Vivo en el Coliseo de Puerto Rico, 14 de Mayo 2022)	Rubén Blades, Roberto Delgado & Orquesta	Tropical		
21	AfroLOVA' 23	Rels B	Rap	"Un Rodeoooo"; "Slita y sueltAAA"	Dale Play
Maverick	Redimi2	Christian		Redimi2	
28	Everybody Go To The Discotek	Darell	Urbano		Dale Play
28	Tu Iglesia	Marcos Witt	Christian		CanZion

==== August ====
Day	Title	Artist	Genre(s)	Singles	Label
3	El Comienzo	Grupo Frontera	Regional Mexican	"No Se Va (En Vivo)"; "Que Vuelvas"; "Un x100to"; "Le Va Doler"; "Ojitos Rojos"; "El Amor de Su Vida"; "De Lunes a Lunes"	VHR Music
3	Afrodhit	Iza	Pop	"Fé nas Malucas"	Warner Music Brazil
4	Corleone	Grupo Marca Registrada	Regional Mexican		
4	Xande Canta Caetano	Xande de Pilares	Samba		Gold Records
11	Mañana Será Bonito (Bichota Season)	Karol G	Latin	"S91"; "Mi Ex Tenía Razón"	Bichota Records
11	El Castillo	Juliito	Reggaeton, Trap		La Familia
14	Super	Jão	Pop	"Me Lambe"; "Alinhamento Milenar"	Universal Music
15	Mi Soundtrack Vol. 1	Gloria Trevi	Latin pop	"Que Se Acabe el Mundo"	Great Talent Records
18	DLUX	DannyLux	Latin	"Te Fallé"; "Te Extraño y Lo Siento..."; "Zafiro"; "Amar Y Perder"; "Mi Hogar"	Warner Music Latina
18	Adentro	Francisca Valenzuela	Pop rock		Frantastic
23	La Sánchez	Lila Downs	Regional Mexican		
25	Don Juan	Maluma	Reggaeton	"Sobrio"; "Mama Tetema"; "Junio"; "La Fórmula"; "La Reina"; "Diablo, Qué Chimba"; "Coco Loco"; "Parcera"; "Según Quién"; "Trofeo"	Sony Latin
25	Cometa	Luciana Souza & Trio Corrente	Latin jazz		
25	El Arte Del Bolero, Vol. 2	Miguel Zenón & Luis Perdomo	Latin jazz		
29	Escândalo Íntimo	Luísa Sonza	Pop	"Campo de Morango"; "Principalmente Me Sinto Arrasada"; "Penhasco2"; "Chico"; "La Muerte"	Sony Music Brasil
31	Coda	Yeruza	Urbano		

Day	Title	Artist	Genre(s)	Singles	Label
1	Estrella	Mora	Reggaeton		Rimas
1	Obras Maestras	Diego El Cigala	Traditional pop		Sony Music Latin
1	Quem É Ela?	Mariana Nolasco			No Santo Som, Universal Music
8	Obsessed Pt. 2	Yahritza y su Esencia	Regional Mexican	"Inseparables"; "Cambiaste"; "No Se Puede Decir Adiós"; "Nuestra Canción"; "Frágil"; "Dos Extraños"	Lumbre Music; Columbia; Sony Music Latin
8	Apiazolado	Diego Schissi Quinteto	Tango		Club Del Disco
8	Ya está en el aire	Ullmann Cuarteto	Tango		Independiente
13	My Heart Speaks	Ivan Lins with the Tbilisi Symphony Orchestra	Latin jazz		
14	Rodando Por El Mundo	José Alberto "El Canario"	Traditional tropical		Los Canarios Music
14	Fandango	Los Angeles Philharmonic	Classical		Los Angeles Philharmonic, Platoon
18	Hiper	Hello Seahorse!	Alternative		
18	Fantasies of Buenos Aires	Lincoln Trio	Classical		Acqua
21	Alpha	Aitana	Dance	"Los Ángeles"; "Las Babys"; "Mi Amor"	Universal Music Spain
21	¿Quién Trae las Cornetas?	Rawayana	Rock		
22	ALTER EGO	Chesca	Reggaeton	"Ella Perrea"; "Blam Blam"; "Pichaera"; "Bicha"; "Carajo Sabes Tu"; "Cupido"; "ACTIVA"	Saban Music Latin
22	Manual de Romería	Rodrigo Cuevas			
28	Esquinas	Becky G	Regional Mexican	"Chanel"; "La Nena"; "Querido Abuelo"	Sony Latin
28	Me Siento Vivo	David Bisbal	Pop Latino	"Ajedrez"; "Ay, Ay, Ay"; "Tengo Roto El Corazón"; "Me Siento Vivo"	Universal Music Spain
28	Mi Soundtrack Vol. 2	Gloria Trevi	Latin pop	"Siempre Yo"	Great Talent Records
29	Mor, No Le Temas a la Oscuridad	Feid	Urbano Latino	"Niña Bonita"; "Vente Conmigo"; "Ferxxo 151"; "Bubalú"; "Ferxxo Edition"; "Privilegios"; "Luces de Tecno"; "Ey Chory"; "Románticos de Lunes"	Universal Latino
29	Timbre	Salvador Sobral	Jazz	"Pedra Quente"	Warner Music
29	MILLAS	Yubeili	Urbano Latino	"Copiloto"; "Nota"; "Traigan Alcohol"; "Sin Ropa"; "PASEITO"; "Kawasaki"; "Desayuno"	Saban Music Latin
29	Subúrbio (Ao Vivo)	Tiee	Samba		Som Livre

=== Fourth quarter ===
==== October ====
Day	Title	Artist	Genre(s)	Singles	Label
3	En Dormir Sin Madrid - EP	Bizarrap & Milo J	Latin	"Milo J: Bzrp Music Sessions, Vol. 57"	Dale Play Records
5	$ad Boyz 4 Life II	Junior H	Música Mexicana	"Y Lloro"	Warner Music Latina
6	PaloSanto	NIA	Pop	"Me Muero de Risa"; "Candela"; "Caminito de Lamento"; "Carrusel"; "Sabor Guajiro"; "PaloSanto"; "Me Sientas Bien"; "Brujería"; "Mucho Con Demasiao"	Must! Producciones
6	Trackhouse	Pitbull	Latin	"Mami"; "Me Pone Mal"; "Jumpin"; "Freak 54 (Freak Out)"; "Let's Take a Shot"; "Suave"; "Lit in the City"; "It Takes 3"	Mr. 305 Records
10	Puti Island	Jamsha	Reggaeton	"Remero"	Trash Toy
12	Raiz Goiânia (Ao Vivo)	Lauana Prado	Sertanejo		Universal Music
13	Nadie Sabe Lo Que Va a Pasar Mañana	Bad Bunny	Latin	"Where She Goes"; "Un Preview"	Rimas
13	Encontro Das Águas	Yamandu Costa and Armandinho Macêdo			Bagual Produções
19	Karma	Diana Burco			Codiscos
20	Pa Las Baby's y Belikeada	Fuerza Regida	Música Mexicana	"TQM"; "Sabor Fresa"	Sony Music Latin
20	Siempre Gabriella	Gabriella	Tejano		GT Digital
20	Vida (Ao Vivo)	Eli Soares	Christian		Universal Music Christian
20	Me Chama de Gato Que Eu Sou Sua	Ana Frango Elétrico	Rock		Universal Music Christian
26	Almas Paralelas	Laura Pausini	Pop Latino	"Un Buen Inicio"; "Durar"; "Frente a Nosotros"	Warner Music Italia
26	Cuando Ella me Besó Probé a Dios	Bruses	Pop rock		Honey
27	Bailemos Otra Vez	Chayanne	Pop Latino	"Bailando Bachata"; "Como Tú y Yo"; "Te Amo y Punto"	Sony Latin
27	Antología 20 Años	Natalia Jiménez	Pop Latino	"El Pobre"; "Creo En Mí (Versión: Antología 20 Años)"	Sony Latin
27	Trappii	Jay Wheeler	Latin	"Trappii"; "Throwback"; "Gangsta Luv"; "Pacto"	Dynamic Records
27	El Exitoso	El Fantasma	Musica Mexicana		Afinarte Music
27	Epílogo: La Clave del Tiempo	Jeremy Bosch	Contemporary tropical		License To Love
27	Alcione 50 Anos (Ao Vivo)	Alcione Nazareth	Samba		Biscoito Fino
27	As I Travel	Donald Vega featuring Lewis Nash, John Patitucci and Luisito Quintero	Latin jazz		
27	The Hunting	Baby Rasta & Gringo	Reggaeton		Wolflow Music

==== November ====
Day	Title	Artist	Genre(s)	Singles	Label
1	Noviembre	Los Bunkers	Pop rock	"Rey"; "Bajo los Árboles"; "Calles de Talcahuano"; "Infiel"; "Ya No Te Esperaré"	OCESA Seitrack
2	Milamores	Sofía Reyes	Latino	"Hoy Me Porto Mal"; "Cobarde"; "Luna"; "Tqum"	Warner Music Latina
2	Mar Adentro	Juliana	Traditional pop		Warner Music Mexico
2	'Ta Malo	Silvestre Dangond	Vallenato		Sony Music Latin
3	.MP3	Emilia	Pop, R&B	"Jagger"; "No Se Ve"; "Guerrero"; "GTA"; "La Original"; "Exclusive"	Sony Music Latin
3	Sugar Papi	Marshmello	Electronic dance music, reggaeton	"El Merengue"; "Esta Vida"; "Como Yo :("; "Tempo"; "Alcohol"	Sony Latin; Joytime Collective
3	Radio Güira	Juan Luis Guerra	Merenche, Bachata	"Mambo 23"; "La Noviecita"	Rimas
3	El Trio: Live in Italy	Horacio "El Negro" Hernández, John Beasley & José Gola	Merenche, Bachata	"Mambo 23"; "La Noviecita"	Rimas
9	Autopoiética	Mon Laferte	Alternative	"Tenochtitlán"; "No+Sad"	Universal Music Mexico
9	Luan City 2.0 (Ao Vivo)	Luan Santana	Sertanejo		Sony Music Brasil
10	20 Años Sin Noticias	Melendi	Pop Latino	"Con La Luna Llena"; "Hablando En Plata"; "Con Solo una Sonrisa"	Sony Music Spain
10	El Rey Del Dembow	El Alfa	Urbano Latino	"Rulay & Pica Pollo"; "Doggy Doggy"; "Moli"; "Rico Feo"; "Plebada"; "La Gringa"; "Paleta Pa To El Mundo"; "El Dueño De Lo Croky"; "Te Llenaste"; "Tekiriki"	El Jefe Records
15	Outros Cantos	Milton Nascimento and Chitãozinho & Xororó	MPB		Onda Musical
16	Scratch de Versos	El Riqué	Singer-songwriter		Palapa
17	Cosmo	Ozuna	Urbano Latino	"El Plan"	Sony Music Latin
17	Sentimiento, Elegancia y Más Maldad	Arcángel	Trap Latino	"La Chamba"; "Plutón"; "Me Gusta Tu Flow"	Rimas Entertainment
17	Presente	Julión Álvarez	Regional Mexican		
24	Cintilante (Ao Vivo)	Simone Mendes	Sertanejo		Universal Music
30	Deixa Vir - Vol II (Ao Vivo)	Thalles Roberto	Christian		Sony Music Brasil
30	Aguidavi do Jêje	Aguidavi Do Jêje & Luizinho Do Jêje	Folk		Rocinante
30	De Norte a Sul	João Gomes	Folk		Jg Shows, Believe

==== December ====
Day	Title	Artist	Genre(s)	Singles	Label
1	Ferxxocalipsis	Feid	Urbano	"Luna"	Universal Music Latino
1	A Mis Ancestros	Yeisy Rojas	Traditional tropical		Yeisy Rojas
1	Mariachi y Tequila	Majo Aguilar	Mariachi		Fonovisa
1	C4 Suena a Navidad	C4 Trío	Folk		C4 Trío
1	Cantemos Juntos	Claraluna	Children's music		2023 Claraluna Taller
1	El Demo	Sanchz	Reggaeton, Trap	"Este Feeling"	Duars Entertainment
4	Navidad de Norte a Sur: Cantoaegre Big Band (En Vivo)	Cantoalegre & Orquesta La Pascasia	Children's music		Cantoalegre
8	A Todo Sí	Malú	Pop	"Ausente"; "Diles"; "Enamorada"; "Ahora Tú"	Sony Music
8	La Sociedad de la Cumbia (Big Band Live)	Puerto Candelaria	Cumbia		Merlín Studios
8	Nasty Singles	Natti Natasha	Reggaeton	"Wow BB" "Mayor Que Usted" "Lokita" "To Esto Es Tuyo" "En Bajita" "Algarete"	Pina Records
8	WLGS	YOVNGCHIMI	Trap	"Tu$$i"	Encore Recordings
14	GRX	Lola Índigo	Pop	"Yo Tengo un Novio"; "Una Bachata"	Universal Music
14	Lagum Ao Vivo	Lagum		Rock	Sony Music Brasil
14	Portas (Ao Vivo)	Marisa Monte	MPB		Phonomotor
15	El Principe 2	Cosculluela	Reggaeton, Trap	"Pa La Proxima"	Rott Boyz Inc
15	Tangos Cruzados	Franco Luciani and Fabrizio Mocata	Tango		Acqua
19	In Concert (Ao Vivo)	Rosa de Saron	Christian		Rosa de Saron
20	El cantor de tangos	Guillermo Fernández featuring Cristian Zarate	Tango		Acqua
24	De Lejitos	Jessi Uribe	Regional Mexican		

== Major tours, concerts, and festivals ==
- Luis Miguel announces self-titled 2023 and is scheduled to start on 3 August 2023.
- Enrique Iglesias, Ricky Martin, and Pitbull announce their Trilogy Tour and are scheduled to start the tour on 14 October 2023.
- Alejandro Sanz will make his first US tour (Sanz En Vivo) since before the COVID-19 pandemic.
- Andres Calamaro launch his Agenda 2023 tour in the US with four confirmed concerts.
- Ángela Aguilar headlines her own solo Piensa En Mi tour for the first time. Her father Pepe Aguilar is also touring through Mexico and the US as well.
- Banda MS begins touring in February 2023 to celebrate their 20th anniversary.
- Becky G tours throughout the US in her Mi Casa, Tu Casa tour, her first headlining tour.
- Blessd commences his Blessd Corner North American Tour on 29 April.
- Boza kicks his first US tour under the Volar Tour which begins on 22 June 2023.
- Carín León launches his Colmillo de Leche tour throughout the US.
- Carlos Rivera announces his Un Tour a Todas Partes beginning on 7 June where he tours throughout Mexico, Costa Rica, the Dominican Republic, the US, and Spain.
- To celebrate his 30 years of music, Carlos Vives launches the El Tour de los 30 which begins in August 2023.
- Christian Nodal tours in the US in his Foraji2 tour beginning on 25 August 2023.
- CNCO will perform their farewell tour titled Última Cita and will tour throughout Latin America, Europe, and the US.
- Danna Paola will tour in the US with heir XT4S1S USA tour for the first time.
- Diego El Cigala will visit several cities throughout his Obras Maestras tour.
- El Alfa will beginning touring his La Leyenda Del Dembow USA Tour beginning in October 2023.
- Fonsceca will tour throughout the US and Europe on his Viajantes tour.
- Grupo Frontera will commemorate their first anniversary with the El Comienzo tour, touring in the US for the first time.
- To further promote their album Clichés, Jesse & Joy will tour throughout the US and Canada beginning on 15 June 2023.
- Jhayco will tour throughout the US on his Vida Rockstar tour.
- Kany García tours throughout the US on her 2023 U.S.A. Tour.
- Laura Pausini will begin her first tour since 2019 throughout Europe, Latin America, and the US.
- Los Fabulosos Cadillacs will perform in five cities in the US.
- Lupita D'Alessio will perform her favor tour titled Gracias U.S. Tour following a five decade stint with her music career.
- To further promote Don Juan, Maluma will tour throughout the US.
- Maná began tour in the US with their México Lindo y Querido tour in February 2023.
- After touring with his former band Los Bukis in 2021 and 2022, Marco Antonio Solís returns to doing a solo tour with his El Buki Tour throughout the US.
- To celebrate her 20 years in music, Natalia Jiménez will tour in Spain, Mexico, and the US titled Antología: 20 Años.
- Peso Pluma will headline his first-ever US tour.
- Piso 21 launches their Los Muchachos Tour to promote the album of the same name.
- RBD members (except for Alfonso Herrera) reunites for the Soy Rebelde Tour and will perform throughout Mexico, Brazil, and the US.
- Ricardo Arjona extends his Blanco y Negro tour with the North American leg being titled Blanco y Negro: Volver.
- To promote Formula, Vol. 3 (2022), Romeo Santos will tour throughout Latin America and the US with his Fórmula, Vol. 3: La Gira.
- Santa Fe Klan will tour the US again with his Todo y Nada tour.
- Santiago Cruz launches his Después de la Tormenta tour on 24 October 2023.
- Siddhartha is touring throughout Mexico and the US.
- Sin Bandera will celebrate their 20-year trajectory with their @Frecuencia Tour throughout the US.
- Tini tours throughout Latin America, Europe, and the US on her self-titled tour.
- Young Miko launches her world tour in Guatemala and will tour throughout Spain, Latin America, and the US.
- The La Línea festival in London, England featuring Jorge Drexler, Susana Baca, and Emicida.
- The Tamarindo Festival in Washington DC highlighting Afro-Latino and Caribbean disapora and featuring artists such as Sech, Tokischa, and Chimbala.
- The Sauce Boyz Fest in Puerto Rico highlighting artists from the urbano field.
- The Reggaetón Lima Festival featuring the genre in Lima, Peru.
- The Sueños will feature its second annual show with artists such as Becky G, Eladio Carrión, Chencho Corleone, Junior H, Gera MX, Ryan Castro, Young Miko, and paopao.
- The My Fest Cantabria Infinita in Spain, a new festival featuring Spanish and Argentinian artists.
- The Milano Latin Festival in Milano, Italy.
- The 2023 Baja Beach Fest in Mexico.
- The second annual Bésame Mucho event featuring Latin rock artists.
- The Lali Tour by Lali throughout Europe, the United Arab Emirates, and Mexico.

== Year-End ==
=== Performance in the United States ===
==== Albums ====
The following is a list of the 10 best-performing Latin albums in the United States according to Billboard and Nielsen SoundScan, which compiles data from traditional sales and album-equivalent units.

Rank	Album	Artist
1	Un Verano Sin Ti	Bad Bunny
2	Mañana Será Bonito	Karol G
3	Génesis	Peso Pluma
4	YHLQMDLG	Bad Bunny
5	Dañado	Iván Cornejo
6	Desvelado	Eslabon Armado
7	Saturno	Rauw Alejandro
8	Pa Que Hablen	Fuerza Regida
9	El Último Tour Del Mundo	Bad Bunny
10	Mañana Será Bonito (Bichota Season)	Karol G

==== Songs ====
The following is a list of the 10 best-performing Latin songs in the United States according to Billboard and Nielsen SoundScan, which compiles data from streaming activity, digital sales and radio airplay.

Rank	Single	Artist
1	"Ella Baila Sola"	Eslabon Armado and Peso Pluma
2	"La Bebé"	Yng Lvcas and Peso Pluma
3	"Un x100to"	Grupo Frontera and Bad Bunny
4	"TQG"	Karol G and Shakira
5	"Bebe Dame"	Fuerza Regida and Grupo Frontera
6	"Where She Goes"	Bad Bunny
7	"Tití Me Preguntó"	Bad Bunny
8	"PRC"	Peso Pluma and Natanael Cano
9	"Por Las Noches"	Peso Pluma
10	"Me Porto Bonito"	Bad Bunny and Chencho Corleone

== Deaths ==
- January 4:
  - Albita Eagan, 69, Cuban-born American public and talent relations executive
  - Walter Ulloa, 74, Mexican American music executive
- January 8 – Eddie Lopez, 66, Salsa music DJ
- January 10 – José Evangelista, 79, Spanish composer.
- January 18 – Victor Rasgado, 63, Mexican pianist and composer.
- January 26 – Héctor Rey, 54, Puerto Rican salsa singer ("Te Propongo")
- February 11 – Tito Fernández, 80, Chilean singer-songwriter.
- February 16 – Marilú, 95, Mexican singer and actress (El barchante Neguib).
- February 17 – Pansequito, 78, Spanish flamenco singer, brain cancer.
- February 22 – Germano Mathias, 88, Brazilian samba singer.
- March 1 – Irma Serrano, 89, Mexican actress (Tiburoneros, El monasterio de los buitres, Las amantes del señor de la noche) and singer, heart attack.
- March 3 – Sueli Costa, 79, Brazilian composer and singer.
- March 9 – Polito Vega, 84, Puerto Rican salsa DJ
- March 13 – Canisso, 57, Brazilian bassist
- March 15 – Théo de Barros, 80, Brazilian composer and musician (Quarteto Novo).
- March 17 – Fito Olivares, 75, Mexican cumbia musician.
- March 28 – Blas Durán, 73, Dominican bachata singer.
- April 2 – Pedro Lavirgen, 92, Spanish tenor.
- April 10 – Julián Figueroa, 27, Mexican singer, son of Joan Sebastian
- April 17 – Ivan Conti, 76, Brazilian drummer (Azymuth) and composer.
- May 8 – Rita Lee, 75, Brazilian singer (Os Mutantes), lung cancer.
- May 20 – Paul Desenne, 63, Venezuelan cellist and composer, heart attack.
- May 23 – Javier Álvarez, 67, Mexican composer.
- June 1:
  - Pedro Messone, 88, Chilean singer, composer and actor.
  - Pacho El Antifeka, 42, Puerto Rican rapper, shot.
- June 5 – Astrud Gilberto, 83, Brazilian singer
- June 30 - Abel Chavarrilla (known as AC Cruz), 57, American Tejano DJ and podcaster
- July 4 – Canelita Medina, 84, Venezuelan salsa singer.
- July 7 – Violeta Hemsy de Gainza, 94, Argentine pianist and piano pedagogue.
- July 17 – João Donato, 88, Brazilian jazz and bossa nova pianist.
- July 24:
  - Leny Andrade, 80, Brazilian singer and musician.
  - Cecilia Pantoja, 79, Chilean singer-songwriter.
- August 8 – Chico Novarro, 89, Argentine singer-songwriter.
- September 3:
  - Lefty SM, 31, Mexican rapper, shot
  - Camilo Valencia, 63, Cuban arranger, musician, and producer
- September 4 – Teté Caturla, 85, Cuban singer (Cuarteto d'Aida).
- September 6 – Javier Andrade, 58, Argentine MTV Latino host
- September 7 – María Jiménez, 73, Spanish singer.
- September 22 – Olga Chorens, 99, Cuban singer and actress.
- September 27 – Ernesto 'Teto' Ocampo, 54, Colombian guitarist
- November 4 – Manuel Castillo Girón, 83, Honduran musician
- November 14 – Chabelita Fuentes, 92, Chilean harpist and folk singer
- November 19 – Sara Tavares, 45, Portuguese singer, brain tumour.
- November 21 – Horacio Malvicino, 94, Argentine jazz and tango guitarist and composer.
- December 13 – Pedro Henrique, 30, Brazilian gospel singer
- December 16:
  - Óscar Agudelo, 91, Colombian musician, complications from Parkinson's and Alzheimer's diseases.
  - Carlos Lyra, 90, Brazilian singer and composer ("Maria Ninguém").
- December 18 – Pilarín Bueno, 79, Spanish jota singer
- December 23 – Lisandro Meza, 86, Colombian singer and accordionist, complications from a stroke.
- December 28 – Pedro Suárez-Vértiz, 54, Peruvian singer-songwriter and guitarist, heart attack.
