= List of number-one singles of 2023 (Brazil) =

This is a list of songs that reached number one in Brazil in 2023.

== Billboard ==
=== Brazil Songs ===
Brazil Songs is published by Billboard, ranking the top 25 songs weekly in Brazil. Chart rankings are based on digital sales and online streaming.

Issue date	Song	Artist(s)	Ref.
January 7	"Bombonzinho"	Israel & Rodolffo and Ana Castela	
January 14	"Bombonzinho"	Israel & Rodolffo and Ana Castela	
January 21	"Leão"	Marília Mendonça	
January 28	"Leão"	Marília Mendonça	
February 4	"Leão"	Marília Mendonça	
February 11	"Leão"	Marília Mendonça	
February 18	"Zona de Perigo"	Leo Santana	
February 25	"Zona de Perigo"	Leo Santana	
March 4	"Zona de Perigo"	Leo Santana	
March 11	"Leão"	Marília Mendonça	
March 18	"Nosso Quadro"	Ana Castela	
March 25	"Nosso Quadro"	Ana Castela	
April 1	"Nosso Quadro"	Ana Castela	
April 8	"Nosso Quadro"	Ana Castela	
April 15	"Nosso Quadro"	Ana Castela	
April 22	"Nosso Quadro"	Ana Castela	
April 29	"Nosso Quadro"	Ana Castela	
May 6	"Nosso Quadro"	Ana Castela	
May 13	"Nosso Quadro"	Ana Castela	
May 20	"Nosso Quadro"	Ana Castela	
May 27	"Nosso Quadro"	Ana Castela	
June 3	"Nosso Quadro"	Ana Castela	
June 10	"Nosso Quadro"	Ana Castela	
June 17	"Tá OK"	Dennis DJ and Kevin o Chris	
June 24	"Tá OK"	Dennis DJ and Kevin o Chris	
July 1	"Tá OK"	Dennis DJ and Kevin o Chris	
July 8	"Tá OK"	Dennis DJ and Kevin o Chris	
July 15	"Tá OK"	Dennis DJ and Kevin o Chris	
July 22	"Tá OK"	Dennis DJ and Kevin o Chris	
July 29	"Tá OK"	Dennis DJ and Kevin o Chris	
August 5	"Tá OK"	Dennis DJ and Kevin o Chris	
August 12	"Halls na Língua"	Kadu Martins	
August 19	"Tá OK"	Dennis DJ, Kevin o Chris, Maluma and Karol G	

=== Brasil Hot 100 ===
Brasil Hot 100 is published by Billboard Brasil, ranking the top 100 songs weekly in Brazil. Chart rankings are based on online streaming.

No.	Issue date	Song	Artist(s)	Ref.
1	August 28	"Faz um Vuk Vuk (Teto Espelhado)"	Kevin o Chris and DJ Nk da Serra	
1	September 4	"Faz um Vuk Vuk (Teto Espelhado)"	Kevin o Chris and DJ Nk da Serra	
1	September 11	"Faz um Vuk Vuk (Teto Espelhado)"	Kevin o Chris and DJ Nk da Serra	
2	September 18	"Chico"	Luísa Sonza	
3	September 25	"Let's Go 4"	DJ GBR, MC IG, MC Ryan SP, MC PH, MC Davi, MC Luki, MC Don Juan, MC Kadu, TrapLaudo, MC GP and MC GH do 7	
3	October 2	"Let's Go 4"	DJ GBR, MC IG, MC Ryan SP, MC PH, MC Davi, MC Luki, MC Don Juan, MC Kadu, TrapLaudo, MC GP and MC GH do 7	
4	October 9	"Canudinho"	Gusttavo Lima and Ana Castela	
4	October 16	"Canudinho"	Gusttavo Lima and Ana Castela	
4	October 23	"Canudinho"	Gusttavo Lima and Ana Castela	
4	October 30	"Canudinho"	Gusttavo Lima and Ana Castela	
5	November 6	"Baile do Bruxo"	Tropa do Bruxo, DJ Ws da Igrejinha, SMU, Triz and MC Menor Thalis	
6	November 13	"Daqui pra Sempre"	Manu Bahtidão and Simone Mendes	
6	November 20	"Daqui pra Sempre"	Manu Bahtidão and Simone Mendes	
6	November 27	"Daqui pra Sempre"	Manu Bahtidão and Simone Mendes	
re	December 4	"Let's Go 4"	DJ GBR, MC IG, MC Ryan SP, MC PH, MC Davi, MC Luki, MC Don Juan, MC Kadu, TrapLaudo, MC GP and MC GH do 7	
re	December 11	"Let's Go 4"	DJ GBR, MC IG, MC Ryan SP, MC PH, MC Davi, MC Luki, MC Don Juan, MC Kadu, TrapLaudo, MC GP and MC GH do 7	
re	December 18	"Let's Go 4"	DJ GBR, MC IG, MC Ryan SP, MC PH, MC Davi, MC Luki, MC Don Juan, MC Kadu, TrapLaudo, MC GP and MC GH do 7	
re	December 25	"Daqui pra Sempre"	Manu Bahtidão and Simone Mendes	

== Crowley Top 100 Airplay ==
Top 100 Brasil is compiled and published by Crowley Broadcast Analysis and measures the airplay of songs being played on radio stations throughout the Brazil across all musical genres.

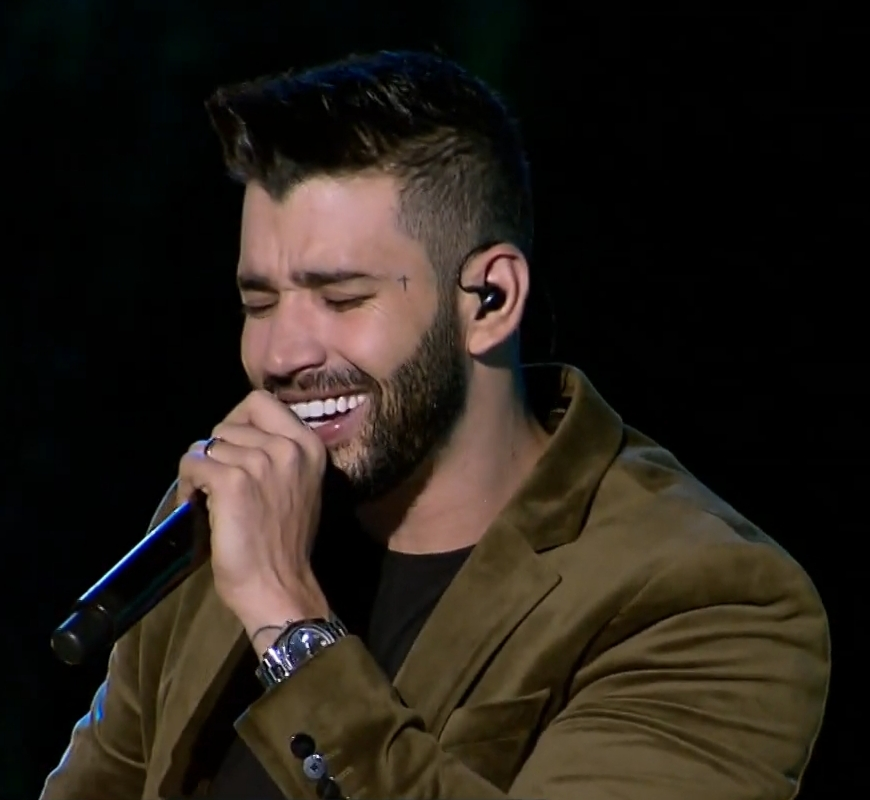
"Desejo Imortal (It Must Have Been Love)" by Gusttavo Lima was the most played song on the radio in 2023.

Key
†	Indicates best-performing song of 2023

Issue date	Song	Artist(s)	Ref.
January 2	"Esse B.O é Meu"	Guilherme & Benuto and Matheus & Kauan	
January 9	"Esse B.O é Meu"	Guilherme & Benuto and Matheus & Kauan	
January 16	"Esse B.O é Meu"	Guilherme & Benuto and Matheus & Kauan	
January 23	"Esse B.O é Meu"	Guilherme & Benuto and Matheus & Kauan	
January 30	"Esse B.O é Meu"	Guilherme & Benuto and Matheus & Kauan	
February 6	"Esse B.O é Meu"	Guilherme & Benuto and Matheus & Kauan	
February 13	"Esse B.O é Meu"	Guilherme & Benuto and Matheus & Kauan	
February 20	"Esse B.O é Meu"	Guilherme & Benuto and Matheus & Kauan	
February 27	"Esse B.O é Meu"	Guilherme & Benuto and Matheus & Kauan	
March 6	"A Culpa é Nossa"	Maiara & Maraisa	
March 13	"Oi Balde"	Zé Neto & Cristiano	
March 20	"Namorando ou Não"	Clayton & Romário and Luan Santana	
March 27	"Frequência de Saudade"	Diego & Victor Hugo	
April 3	"Namorando ou Não"	Clayton & Romário and Luan Santana	
April 10	"Fim do Mundo"	Gustavo Mioto	
April 17	"Namorando ou Não"	Clayton & Romário and Luan Santana	
April 24	"Frequência de Saudade"	Diego & Victor Hugo	
May 1	"Desejo Imortal (It Must Have Been Love)" †	Gusttavo Lima	
May 8	"Desejo Imortal (It Must Have Been Love)" †	Gusttavo Lima	
May 15	"Desejo Imortal (It Must Have Been Love)" †	Gusttavo Lima	
May 22	"Desejo Imortal (It Must Have Been Love)" †	Gusttavo Lima	
May 29	"Desejo Imortal (It Must Have Been Love)" †	Gusttavo Lima	
June 5	"Desejo Imortal (It Must Have Been Love)" †	Gusttavo Lima	
June 12	"Desejo Imortal (It Must Have Been Love)" †	Gusttavo Lima	
June 19	"Desejo Imortal (It Must Have Been Love)" †	Gusttavo Lima	
June 26	"Desejo Imortal (It Must Have Been Love)" †	Gusttavo Lima	
July 3	"Desejo Imortal (It Must Have Been Love)" †	Gusttavo Lima	
July 10	"Desejo Imortal (It Must Have Been Love)" †	Gusttavo Lima	
July 17	"Desejo Imortal (It Must Have Been Love)" †	Gusttavo Lima	
July 24	"Desejo Imortal (It Must Have Been Love)" †	Gusttavo Lima	
July 31	"Desejo Imortal (It Must Have Been Love)" †	Gusttavo Lima	
August 7	"Manda um Oi"	Guilherme & Benuto and Simone Mendes	
August 14	"Manda um Oi"	Guilherme & Benuto and Simone Mendes	
August 21	"Parece Fake"	Alexandre Pires and Maiara & Maraisa	
August 28	"E Aí"	Luan Santana	
September 4	"E Aí"	Luan Santana	
September 11	"Principalmente Pessoas"	Yasmin Santos and Diego & Victor Hugo	
September 18	"Principalmente Pessoas"	Yasmin Santos and Diego & Victor Hugo	
September 25	"Milionário"	Guilherme & Benuto and Wesley Safadão	
October 2	"Principalmente Pessoas"	Yasmin Santos and Diego & Victor Hugo	
October 9	"Milionário"	Guilherme & Benuto and Wesley Safadão	
October 16	"Milionário"	Guilherme & Benuto and Wesley Safadão	
October 23	"Milionário"	Guilherme & Benuto and Wesley Safadão	
October 30	"Milionário"	Guilherme & Benuto and Wesley Safadão	
November 6	"Milionário"	Guilherme & Benuto and Wesley Safadão	
November 13	"Milionário"	Guilherme & Benuto and Wesley Safadão	
November 20	"Milionário"	Guilherme & Benuto and Wesley Safadão	
November 27	"Milionário"	Guilherme & Benuto and Wesley Safadão	
December 4	"Milionário"	Guilherme & Benuto and Wesley Safadão	
December 11	"Milionário"	Guilherme & Benuto and Wesley Safadão	
December 18	"Milionário"	Guilherme & Benuto and Wesley Safadão	
December 25	"Daqui pra Sempre"	Manu Bahtidão and Simone Mendes	
