= List of Billboard Hot Latin Songs and Latin Airplay number ones of 2023 =

The Billboard Hot Latin Songs and Latin Airplay are charts that rank the best-performing Latin songs in the United States and are both published weekly by Billboard magazine. The Hot Latin Songs chart ranks the best-performing Spanish-language songs in the country based on digital downloads, streaming, and airplay from all radio stations. The Latin Airplay chart ranks the most-played songs on Spanish-language radio stations in the United States regardless of genre or language.

== Chart history ==
Chart history
Issue date	Hot Latin Songs			Latin Airplay		
Issue date	Title	Artist(s)	Ref.	Title	Artist(s)	Ref.
January 7	"Tití Me Preguntó"	Bad Bunny		"Monotonía"	Shakira and Ozuna	
January 14	"Tití Me Preguntó"	Bad Bunny		"Monotonía"	Shakira and Ozuna	
January 21	"Bebé Dame"	Fuerza Regida and Grupo Frontera		"Monotonía"	Shakira and Ozuna	
January 28	"Bzrp Music Sessions, Vol. 53"	Bizarrap and Shakira		"Monotonía"	Shakira and Ozuna	
February 4	"Bzrp Music Sessions, Vol. 53"	Bizarrap and Shakira		"Bzrp Music Sessions, Vol. 53"	Bizarrap and Shakira	
February 11	"Bzrp Music Sessions, Vol. 53"	Bizarrap and Shakira		"Party"	Bad Bunny and Rauw Alejandro	
February 18	"Bzrp Music Sessions, Vol. 53"	Bizarrap and Shakira		"Bzrp Music Sessions, Vol. 53"	Bizarrap and Shakira	
February 25	"Bzrp Music Sessions, Vol. 53"	Bizarrap and Shakira		"El Pañuelo"	Romeo Santos and Rosalía	
March 4	"Bebé Dame"	Fuerza Regida and Grupo Frontera		"Hey Mor"	Ozuna and Feid	
March 11	"TQG"	Karol G and Shakira		"Bzrp Music Sessions, Vol. 53"	Bizarrap and Shakira	
March 18	"TQG"	Karol G and Shakira		"Bzrp Music Sessions, Vol. 53"	Bizarrap and Shakira	
March 25	"TQG"	Karol G and Shakira		"Bebé Dame"	Fuerza Regida and Grupo Frontera	
April 1	"TQG"	Karol G and Shakira		"Besos Moja2"	Wisin & Yandel and Rosalía	
April 8	"TQG"	Karol G and Shakira		"Ulalá"	Myke Towers and Daddy Yankee	
April 15	"Ella Baila Sola"	Eslabón Armado and Peso Pluma		"Yandel 150"	Yandel and Feid	
April 22	"Ella Baila Sola"	Eslabón Armado and Peso Pluma		"Yandel 150"	Yandel and Feid	
April 29	"Ella Baila Sola"	Eslabón Armado and Peso Pluma		"Yandel 150"	Yandel and Feid	
May 6	"Ella Baila Sola"	Eslabón Armado and Peso Pluma		"Yandel 150"	Yandel and Feid	
May 13	"Ella Baila Sola"	Eslabón Armado and Peso Pluma		"TQG"	Karol G and Shakira	
May 20	"Ella Baila Sola"	Eslabón Armado and Peso Pluma		"Un x100to"	Grupo Frontera and Bad Bunny	
May 27	"Ella Baila Sola"	Eslabón Armado and Peso Pluma		"Un x100to"	Grupo Frontera and Bad Bunny	
June 3	"Ella Baila Sola"	Eslabón Armado and Peso Pluma		"Un x100to"	Grupo Frontera and Bad Bunny	
June 10	"Ella Baila Sola"	Eslabón Armado and Peso Pluma		"El Merengue"	Marshmello and Manuel Turizo	
June 17	"Ella Baila Sola"	Eslabón Armado and Peso Pluma		"Ella Baila Sola"	Eslabón Armado and Peso Pluma	
June 24	"Ella Baila Sola"	Eslabón Armado and Peso Pluma		"Un x100to"	Grupo Frontera and Bad Bunny	
July 1	"Ella Baila Sola"	Eslabón Armado and Peso Pluma		"Un x100to"	Grupo Frontera and Bad Bunny	
July 8	"Ella Baila Sola"	Eslabón Armado and Peso Pluma		"Un x100to"	Grupo Frontera and Bad Bunny	
July 15	"Ella Baila Sola"	Eslabón Armado and Peso Pluma		"La Bebe"	Yng Lvcas and Peso Pluma	
July 22	"Ella Baila Sola"	Eslabón Armado and Peso Pluma		"TQG"	Karol G and Shakira	
July 29	"Ella Baila Sola"	Eslabón Armado and Peso Pluma		"Me EnRD"	Prince Royce	
August 5	"Ella Baila Sola"	Eslabón Armado and Peso Pluma		"No es Que Me Quiera Ir"	Alejandro Fernández	
August 12	"Ella Baila Sola"	Eslabón Armado and Peso Pluma		"Where She Goes"	Bad Bunny	
August 19	"Ella Baila Sola"	Eslabón Armado and Peso Pluma		"Niña Bonita"	Feid and Sean Paul	
August 26	"Mi Ex Tenía Razón"	Karol G		"Bailando Bachata"	Chayanne	
September 2	"Qlona"	Karol G and Peso Pluma		"Vagabundo"	Sebastián Yatra, Manuel Turizo and Beéle	
September 9	"Qlona"	Karol G and Peso Pluma		"Tucu"	Ozuna and Amarion	
September 16	"Qlona"	Karol G and Peso Pluma		"Podemos Repetirlo"	Don Omar and Chencho Corleone	
September 23	"Qlona"	Karol G and Peso Pluma		"Lala"	Myke Towers	
September 30	"Lady Gaga"	Peso Pluma, Gabito Ballesteros and Junior H		"Un Cigarrillo"	Chencho Corleone	
October 7	"Lady Gaga"	Peso Pluma, Gabito Ballesteros and Junior H		"Mi Ex Tenía Razón"	Karol G	
October 14	"Qlona"	Karol G and Peso Pluma		"Coco Loco"	Maluma	
October 21	"Gently"	Drake featuring Bad Bunny		"Umaye."	Venesti	
October 28	"Mónaco"	Bad Bunny		"Copa Vacía"	Shakira and Manuel Turizo	
November 4	"Mónaco"	Bad Bunny		"Dientes"	J Balvin, Usher and DJ Khaled	
November 11	"Mónaco"	Bad Bunny		"Mi Ex Tenía Razón"	Karol G	
November 18	"Mónaco"	Bad Bunny		"El Jefe"	Shakira and Fuerza Regida	
November 25	"Mónaco"	Bad Bunny		"Lala"	Myke Towers	
December 2	"Mónaco"	Bad Bunny		"Un Preview"	Bad Bunny	
December 9	"Mónaco"	Bad Bunny		"Pasa_je_ro"	Farruko	
December 16	"Mónaco"	Bad Bunny		"Según Quién"	Maluma and Carín León	
December 23	"Mónaco"	Bad Bunny		"Según Quién"	Maluma and Carín León	
December 30	"Mónaco"	Bad Bunny		"Según Quién"	Maluma and Carín León	

== Hot Latin Songs weeks at number one ==
=== Songs ===
Number of weeks	Song	Artist(s)
19	"Ella Baila Sola"	Eslabón Armado and Peso Pluma
10	"Mónaco"	Bad Bunny
5	"Bzrp Music Sessions, Vol. 53"	Bizarrap and Shakira
5	"TQG"	Karol G and Shakira
5	"Qlona"	Karol G and Peso Pluma
2	"Tití Me Preguntó"	Bad Bunny
2	"Bebé Dame"	Fuerza Regida and Grupo Fontera
2	"Lady Gaga"	Peso Pluma, Gabito Ballesteros and Junior H
1	"Mi Ex Tenía Razón"	Karol G
1	"Gently"	Drake featuring Bad Bunny

=== Artists ===
Number of weeks	Artist	Number of songs
26	Peso Pluma	3
19	Eslabón Armado	1
13	Bad Bunny	3
11	Karol G	3
10	Shakira	2
5	Bizarrap	1
2	Fuerza Regida	1
2	Grupo Frontera	1
2	Gabito Ballesteros	1
2	Junior H	1
1	Drake	1

== See also ==
- 2023 in Latin music
- List of artists who reached number one on the U.S. Latin Songs chart
- List of number-one Billboard Latin Albums from the 2020s
