= List of number-one singles of 2023 (Portugal) =

The Portuguese Singles Chart ranks the best-performing singles in Portugal, as compiled by the Associação Fonográfica Portuguesa.

Number-one singles of 2023 in Portugal
Week	Song	Artist	Reference
1	"Calm Down"	Rema	
2	"Como Tu"	Bárbara Bandeira featuring Ivandro	
3	"Flowers"	Miley Cyrus	
4	"Flowers"	Miley Cyrus	
5	"Flowers"	Miley Cyrus	
6	"Flowers"	Miley Cyrus	
7	"Flowers"	Miley Cyrus	
8	"Flowers"	Miley Cyrus	
9	"Die for You"	The Weeknd	
10	"Die for You"	The Weeknd	
11	"Flowers"	Miley Cyrus	
12	"Flowers"	Miley Cyrus	
13	"Flowers"	Miley Cyrus	
14	"Como Tu"	Bárbara Bandeira featuring Ivandro	
15	"Planeta"	Bispo and Bárbara Tinoco	
16	"Planeta"	Bispo and Bárbara Tinoco	
17	"Como Tu"	Bárbara Bandeira featuring Ivandro	
18	"Chakras"	Ivandro and Julinho KSD	
19	"Chakras"	Ivandro and Julinho KSD	
20	"Chakras"	Ivandro and Julinho KSD	
21	"Chakras"	Ivandro and Julinho KSD	
22	"Chakras"	Ivandro and Julinho KSD	
23	"Chakras"	Ivandro and Julinho KSD	
24	"Tá OK"	Dennis and MC Kevin O Chris	
25	"Tá OK"	Dennis and MC Kevin O Chris	
26	"Tá OK"	Dennis and MC Kevin O Chris	
27	"Tá OK"	Dennis and MC Kevin O Chris	
28	"Tá OK"	Dennis and MC Kevin O Chris	
29	"Tá OK"	Dennis and MC Kevin O Chris	
30	"Tá OK"	Dennis and MC Kevin O Chris	
31	"Tá OK"	Dennis and MC Kevin O Chris	
32	"Tá OK"	Dennis and MC Kevin O Chris	
33	"Tá OK"	Dennis and MC Kevin O Chris	
34	"Tá OK"	Dennis and MC Kevin O Chris	
35	"Tá OK"	Dennis and MC Kevin O Chris	
36	"Tá OK"	Dennis and MC Kevin O Chris	
37	"Tá OK"	Dennis and MC Kevin O Chris	
38	"Tá OK"	Dennis and MC Kevin O Chris	
39	"Tempo"	Van Zee	
40	"Tempo"	Van Zee	
41	"Tempo"	Van Zee	
42	"Tempo"	Van Zee	
43	"Tempo"	Van Zee	
44	"Carro"	Bárbara Bandeira	
45	"Carro"	Bárbara Bandeira	
46	"Carro"	Bárbara Bandeira	
47	"Carro"	Bárbara Bandeira	
48	"Tata"	Slow J	
49	"Tata"	Slow J	
50	"Tata"	Slow J	
51	"Tata"	Slow J	
52	"All I Want for Christmas Is You"	Mariah Carey	

== See also ==
- List of number-one albums of 2023 (Portugal)
