= Tá OK =

2023 single by Dennis and Kevin O Chris

Single by Dennis and Kevin O Chris
- Language: Portuguese
- Released: 4 May 2023
- Recorded: 2023
- Genre: Funk carioca
- Length: 1:32; 2:51 (remix)
- Label: Sony Brazil
- Songwriters: Dennison Gomes; Kevin Zanoni
- Producers: Dennison Gomes; Kevin Zanoni

Dennis singles chronology
"Vida Real" (2023)	"Tá OK" (2023)

Kevin O Chris singles chronology
"Noite Estrelada (Zeka remix)" (2023)	"Tá OK" (2023)	"Hipnotiza (Desce Vai Desce)" (2023)

Music video
- "Tá OK" on YouTube

Remix cover
- Cover art of the official remix with Maluma & Karol G

Maluma singles chronology
"El Reloj" (2023)	"Tá OK" (2023)	"Según Quién" (2023)

Karol G singles chronology
"S91" (2023)	"Tá OK" (2023)	"Mi Ex Tenía Razón" (2023)

Music video
- "Tá OK (Remix)" on YouTube

"Tá OK" is a single by Brazilian DJ Dennis and singer Kevin O Chris, released on May 4, 2023, by Sony Music Brazil. Dennis DJ united with Colombian singers Karol G and Maluma for a remixed version of the song, released on August 3 of the same year.

== Release and promotion ==
The song was released on May 4, and gained popularity due to the fact that it is the soundtrack of several videos made by artists, athletes and celebrities, including Gabriel Barbosa, Paulo André, Bruna Griphao and singer L7nnon.

=== Maluma and Karol G remix ===
On August 3, 2023, the remix of the song was released with the participation of Colombian singers Karol G and Maluma. The first clues of Karol G's participation in the remix were on July 29, when the singer posted a story on Instagram liking the song, including its title. A day before the official release, Dennis posted a snippet of the singer's part. On the same day, Maluma posted a snippet of himself in the song, on TikTok.

On her Instagram, the Colombian singer describes it as one of the projects that excites her the most, and as soon as she discovered the song, she didn't hesitate to ask to participate in it.

== Music video ==
The official music video recorded in the community of Tijuquinha, in Rio de Janeiro, brings nostalgic elements, such as the parties and typical clothes of the baile funk's of the 2000s. The video features special appearances by TikToker Xurrasco and MC Menor do Alvorada. The remix version also had a music video featuring Karol G and Maluma. Released simultaneously with the song, the music video was directed by Phill Mendonça and was recorded in Rio de Janeiro, Los Angeles and Brussels.

== Commercial performance ==
On May 31, the song ranked 4th on Spotify's 50 most streamed songs, with over 930,000 plays over the last 24 hours, moving up three spots when compared to the previous day and had already been used in 110,000 TikTok posts. On June 2, the song became number one on Spotify Brazil, and on June 4, and number 46 on the Top 50 Global. After 13 weeks, "Tá OK" surpassed "Nosso Quadro" by Ana Castela, and took over the top of the Brazil Songs chart.

== Charts ==
=== Original version ===
Weekly chart performance for "Tá OK"
Chart (2023)	Peak position
Brazil (Brasil Hot 100)	1
Brazil Funk/Black Music/Rap (Crowley Charts)	1
Global 200 (Billboard)	83
Portugal (AFP)	1

=== Maluma and Karol G remix ===
Weekly chart performance for "Tá OK" (remix) with Maluma and Karol G
Chart (2023)	Peak position
Bolivia (Billboard)	19
Brazil (Billboard)	1
Global 200 (Billboard)	38
Guatemala (Monitor Latino)	20
Luxembourg (Billboard)	17
Paraguay (Monitor Latino)	15
Portugal (Billboard)	1
Spain (Promusicae)	77
Suriname (Nationale Top 40)	9
Uruguay (Monitor Latino)	15
US Hot Latin Songs (Billboard)	40
US World Digital Song Sales (Billboard)	4

=== Monthly charts ===
Monthly chart performance for "Tá OK"
Chart (2023)	Peak position
Brazil Streaming (Pro-Música Brasil)	1

=== Year-end charts ===
Year-end chart performance for "Tá OK"
Chart (2023)	Position
Global 200 (Billboard)	198

== Certifications ==
Certifications for "Tá OK"
Region	Certification	Certified units/sales
Brazil (Pro-Música Brasil)	3× Diamond	900,000^{‡}
Portugal (AFP)	7× Platinum	70,000^{‡}
Spain (Promusicae) certification for "Tá OK Remix"	Platinum	60,000^{‡}
^{‡} Sales+streaming figures based on certification alone.

== Release history ==
Release history for "Tá OK"
Region	Date	Format(s)	Version	Label	Ref.
Various	4 May 2023	Digital download; streaming	Original	Sony	
Various	3 August 2023	Digital download; streaming	Remix	Sony	

== See also ==
- List of number-one singles of 2023 (Brazil)
- List of number-one singles of 2023 (Portugal)
