= Ojitos Lindos =

Single by Bad Bunny and Bomba Estéreo

from the album Un Verano Sin Ti
- Language: Spanish
- Released: February 14, 2023
- Genre: Reggaeton; cumbia; indie pop; psychedelia
- Length: 4:18
- Label: Rimas
- Songwriters: Benito Martínez; Liliana Saumet; Simón Mejía
- Producers: Tainy; La Paciencia; Mvsis

Bad Bunny singles chronology
"Gato de Noche" (2022)	"Ojitos Lindos" (2023)	"Un x100to" (2023)

Bomba Estéreo singles chronology
"Me Duele" (2022)	"Ojitos Lindos" (2023)

Music video
- "Ojitos Lindos" on YouTube

"Ojitos Lindos" (English: "Beautiful Little Eyes") is a song by Puerto Rican rapper Bad Bunny and Colombian band Bomba Estéreo. It was released on February 14, 2023, through Rimas Entertainment as the eighth and final single of Bad Bunny's fifth studio album Un Verano Sin Ti (2022). The song was written by Benito Martínez, Liliana Saumet and Simón Mejía, the latter two who are the members of the Colombian band Bomba Estéreo. The song was produced by Tainy, La Paciencia, and Mvsis. The song was also used in the EA Sports FIFA 23 soundtrack. Ojitos Lindos is primarily a reggaeton, cumbia, indie pop, and psychedelia track that also combines elements of electronic, alternative, reggae, dancehall, and afrobeats.

== Lyrics ==
The lyrics of the song describes a girlfriend who longs to see her boyfriend again and thinks of his scent. She asks him to look into her eyes but, and with that she is fine as she is reborn. The boyfriend replies by saying that he hasn’t texted someone "Good Morning, I Love You" in a long time.

== Critical reception ==
Billboard ranked "Ojitos Lindos" the third best collaboration song from Un Verano Sin Ti, writing that the "collaboration between Bad Bunny and Bomba Estéreo perfectly merges both of their worlds" and that it "thrives on the fusion of trumpets and their fresh beats with a fascinating combination" of Liliana Saumet's high-pitched vocals as well as the "deep and slurred verses" from Bad Bunny.

== Commercial performance ==
Following the release of its parent album, "Ojitos Lindos" charted at number 26 on the US Billboard Hot 100 dated May 21, 2022, making it the ninth-highest charting track from Un Verano Sin Ti, as well as charting on the US Hot Latin Songs at number 7. The song proved to be a significant commercial success as it peaked at number one in Bolivia, Chile, Colombia, Costa Rica, Ecuador, Mexico and Peru, as well as charting on the Billboard Global 200 at number 4. Additionally, it charted within the top 5 in Argentina and Spain.

== Audio visualizer ==
A 360° audio visualizer for the song was uploaded to YouTube on May 6, 2022, along with the other audio visualizer videos of the songs that appeared on Un Verano Sin Ti.

== Music video ==
The music video for "Ojitos Lindos" was released on YouTube on February 14, 2023. As of February 2026, the music video has over 480 million views.

== Charts ==
=== Weekly charts ===
Weekly chart performance for "Ojitos Lindos"
Chart (2022–2026)	Peak position
Argentina Hot 100 (Billboard)	4
Bolivia (Billboard)	1
Bolivia (Monitor Latino)	4
Central America (Monitor Latino)	1
Chile (Billboard)	1
Chile (Monitor Latino)	12
Colombia (Billboard)	1
Colombia Hot 100 (Billboard)	76
Costa Rica (FONOTICA)	1
Costa Rica (Monitor Latino)	12
Ecuador (Billboard)	1
El Salvador (Monitor Latino)	4
Global 200 (Billboard)	4
Guatemala (Monitor Latino)	10
Honduras (Monitor Latino)	2
Latin America (Monitor Latino)	9
Mexico (Billboard)	1
Mexico (Billboard Mexican Airplay)	28
Mexico (Billboard Espanol Airplay)	11
Mexico Streaming (AMPROFON)	3
Nicaragua (Monitor Latino)	4
Panama (Monitor Latino)	6
Panama (PRODUCE)	33
Paraguay (Monitor Latino)	1
Peru (Monitor Latino)	7
Peru (Billboard)	1
Portugal (AFP)	21
Spain (Promusicae)	2
Suriname (Nationale Top 40)	7
Switzerland (Schweizer Hitparade)	57
US Billboard Hot 100	26
US Hot Latin Songs (Billboard)	7
US Latin Rhythm Airplay (Billboard)	18

=== Year-end charts ===
2022 year-end chart performance for "Ojitos Lindos"
Chart (2022)	Position
Global 200 (Billboard)	23
Spain (PROMUSICAE)	12
US Billboard Hot 100	87
US Hot Latin Songs (Billboard)	10

2023 year-end chart performance for "Ojitos Lindos"
Chart (2023)	Position
Global 200 (Billboard)	62

== Certifications ==
Certifications and sales for "Ojitos Lindos"
Region	Certification	Certified units/sales
France (SNEP)	Gold	100,000^{‡}
Italy (FIMI)	Platinum	100,000^{‡}
Portugal (AFP)	3× Platinum	75,000^{‡}
Spain (Promusicae)	8× Platinum	480,000^{‡}
^{‡} Sales+streaming figures based on certification alone.
