= Gato de Noche =

2022 single by Ñengo Flow and Bad Bunny

Single by Ñengo Flow and Bad Bunny

from the album Real G 4 Life, Vol. 4
- Language: Spanish
- Released: December 22, 2022
- Genre: Reggaeton
- Length: 3:47
- Label: Rimas
- Songwriters: Edwin Vázquez; Benito Martínez
- Producers: Bass Charity; Foreign Teck; Smash David

Ñengo Flow singles chronology
"Nike y Adidas" (2022)	"Gato de Noche" (2022)	"Cochinae (remix)" (2023)

Bad Bunny singles chronology
"La Jumpa" (2022)	"Gato de Noche" (2022)	"Ojitos Lindos" (2023)

Music video
- "Gato de Noche" on YouTube

"Gato de Noche" (English: "Night Cat") is a song by Puerto Rican rappers and singers Ñengo Flow and Bad Bunny. It was originally released on December 22, 2022, by Rimas Entertainment, as the first single from Ñengo Flow's seventh studio album, Real G 4 Life, Vol. 4 (2024).

== Chart performance ==
"Gato de Noche" peaked at number 60 on the US Billboard Hot 100 dated January 14, 2023. Additionally, it peaked at number 2 on the US Hot Latin Songs chart and number 28 on the Billboard Global 200.

== Music video ==
The music video for "Gato de Noche" was released on YouTube on December 22, 2022.

== Charts ==
Weekly chart performance for "Gato de Noche"
Chart (2023)	Peak position
Argentina Hot 100 (Billboard)	50
Bolivia (Billboard)	8
Chile (Billboard)	5
Colombia (Billboard)	8
Ecuador (Billboard)	7
Global 200 (Billboard)	28
Mexico (Billboard)	8
Peru (Billboard)	13
Portugal (AFP)	177
Spain (Promusicae)	8
US Billboard Hot 100	60
US Hot Latin Songs (Billboard)	2
