= Peso Pluma: Bzrp Music Sessions, Vol. 55 =

Single by Bizarrap and Peso Pluma
- Language: Spanish
- Released: 31 May 2023
- Recorded: 2023
- Studio: Bzrp Studio (Argentina)
- Genre: Regional Mexican; Latin trap; Corridos tumbados
- Length: 3:12
- Label: Dale Play
- Composers: Gonzalo Julián Conde; Hassan Emilio Kabande Laija
- Producer: Bizarrap

Bizarrap singles chronology
"Arcángel: Bzrp Music Sessions, Vol. 54" (2023)	"Peso Pluma: Bzrp Music Sessions, Vol. 55" (2023)	"Rauw Alejandro: Bzrp Music Sessions, Vol. 56" (2023)

Peso Pluma singles chronology
"Bye" (2023)	"Peso Pluma: Bzrp Music Sessions, Vol. 55" (2023)	"Plebada" (2023)

Music video
- "Peso Pluma: Bzrp Music Sessions, Vol. 55 on YouTube

"Peso Pluma: Bzrp Music Sessions, Vol. 55" is a song by Argentine DJ Bizarrap and Mexican singer and rapper Peso Pluma. It was released on 31 May 2023 through Dale Play.

== Background and release ==
After the release the "Bzrp Music Sessions #54" with Arcángel, on 30 May 2023, just a day before its release, he announced the "Bzrp Music Sessions #55" and that Mexican singer Peso Pluma would be featured in the session. In the trailer video they are shown as rats.

The song was released on 31 May.

== Music video ==
The official music video was released along with the single on 31 May 2023 on Bizarrap's official YouTube channel. The video shows Peso Pluma wearing headphones singing along with Bizarrap cuing the song behind Peso Pluma in a chair where he has a computer. Whenever Pluma laughs in the video, he sticks out his tongue.

== Charts ==
=== Weekly charts ===
Chart performance for "Peso Pluma: Bzrp Music Sessions, Vol. 55"
Chart (2023)	Peak position
Argentina Hot 100 (Billboard)	3
Bolivia (Billboard)	2
Bolivia (Monitor Latino)	9
Chile (Billboard)	2
Colombia (Billboard)	9
Colombia (Promúsica)	8
Costa Rica (FONOTICA)	4
Dominican Republic (SODINPRO)	10
Ecuador (Billboard)	4
Global 200 (Billboard)	2
Guatemala (Monitor Latino)	19
Honduras (Monitor Latino)	9
Mexico (Billboard)	1
Paraguay (Monitor Latino)	11
Peru (Billboard)	5
Spain (Promusicae)	3
US Billboard Hot 100	31
US Hot Latin Songs (Billboard)	5
US Latin Airplay (Billboard)	42

=== Monthly charts ===
Monthly chart performance for "Peso Pluma: Bzrp Music Sessions, Vol. 55"
Chart (2023)	Peak position
Paraguay (SPG)	19
Uruguay (CUD)	6

=== Year-end charts ===
Year-end chart performance for "Peso Pluma: Bzrp Music Sessions, Vol. 55"
Chart (2023)	Position
Global 200 (Billboard)	151
US Hot Latin Songs (Billboard)	22

== Certifications ==
Certifications for "Peso Pluma: Bzrp Music Sessions, Vol. 55"
Region	Certification	Certified units/sales
Spain (Promusicae)	Gold	30,000^{‡}
United States (RIAA)	28× Platinum (Latin)	1,680,000^{‡}
^{‡} Sales+streaming figures based on certification alone.
