= Arcángel: Bzrp Music Sessions, Vol. 54 =

Single by Bizarrap and Arcángel
- Released: March 22, 2023
- Recorded: 2023
- Studio: BZRP Studio, Argentina
- Genre: Hip house; Latin trap; Latin house
- Length: 3:43
- Label: Dale Play Records
- Lyricist: Austin Agustín Santos
- Producer: Bizarrap

Bizarrap singles chronology
"Shakira: Bzrp Music Sessions, Vol. 53" (2023)	"Arcángel: Bzrp Music Sessions, Vol. 54" (2023)	"Peso Pluma: Bzrp Music Sessions, Vol. 55" (2023)

Arcángel singles chronology
"Kame Hame" (2023)	"Arcángel: Bzrp Music Sessions, Vol. 54" (2023)	"Tírame" (2023)

Music video
- "Arcángel: Bzrp Music Sessions, Vol. 54" on YouTube

"Arcángel: Bzrp Music Sessions, Vol. 54" is a song by Argentine producer Bizarrap and American rapper and singer Arcángel belonging to the former's BZRP Music Sessions. It was released on March 22, 2023, through Dale Play Records. It was written by Bizarrap, Arcángel, Robert Rodriguez and Santiago Alvarado.

== Background and promotion ==
After a few months of release the "Music Sessions #53" with Shakira, On March 20, 2023, Bizarrap posted a preview of their upcoming shoot on their social media. On March 21, one day before the publication, the producer confirms that it is a collaboration with the American rapper and singer Arcángel.

== Music video ==
The video clip premiered on March 22, 2023, simultaneously with the accompanying song. In it, Arcángel can be seen performing the song without a shirt, with numerous chains and bracelets and a white hat, while Bizarrap uses his characteristic cap and an Argentine team shirt with the name of soccer player Paulo Dybala.

== Charts ==
Weekly charts for "Arcángel: Bzrp Music Sessions, Vol. 54"
Chart (2023)	Peak position
Argentina Hot 100 (Billboard)	9
Bolivia (Billboard)	11
Central America (Monitor Latino)	11
Chile (Monitor Latino)	11
Colombia (Billboard)	6
Ecuador Pop (Monitor Latino)	19
Ecuador (Billboard)	10
Global 200 (Billboard)	30
Honduras (Monitor Latino)	7
Nicaragua (Monitor Latino)	7
Panama (Monitor Latino)	8
Paraguay Pop (Monitor Latino)	15
Peru Pop (Monitor Latino)	4
Peru (Billboard)	11
Spain (PROMUSICAE)	3
US Hot Latin (Billboard)	34
Venezuela (Monitor Latino)	19

== Certifications ==
Certifications for "Arcángel: Bzrp Music Sessions, Vol. 54"
Region	Certification	Certified units/sales
Mexico (AMPROFON)	Gold	70,000^{‡}
Spain (Promusicae)	Platinum	60,000^{‡}
^{‡} Sales+streaming figures based on certification alone.
