= S91 (song) =

Single by Karol G

from the album Mañana Será Bonito (Bichota Season)
- Language: Spanish
- Released: July 13, 2023
- Genre: Latin trap; EDM
- Length: 2:53
- Label: Bichota; Interscope
- Songwriter: Carolina Giraldo Navarro • Daniel Echavarria Oviedo • Kevyn Mauricio Cruz Moreno
- Producer: Ovy on the Drums

Karol G singles chronology
"Amargura" (2023)	"S91" (2023)	"Tá OK" (2023)

Music video
- "S91" on YouTube

"S91" is a song by Colombian singer-songwriter Karol G. It was written by Karol G, Keityn and Ovy on the Drums, and produced by the latter. The song was released on July 13, 2023, through Bichota Records and Interscope, as the lead single from her second mixtape, Mañana Será Bonito (Bichota Season).

== Background ==
Karol G announced the release of "S91" through her social media accounts on July 11, 2023, with the title, release date and a clip of the music video. The song was released on July 13, 2023.

LABICHOTA
(@karolg)
tweeted:

Family 🖤 S91 is not a single. S91 It's a song that Carolina wanted to do beyond business and numbers... to take advantage of my platform to express myself, to share a message... The content of the video is what I want you to internalize ✨ in addition to the special announcement I have to give you … I love you 🤍 More is coming 🦈

July 13, 2023

On a video shared by through her social media accounts, Karol G revealed the meaning of Psalm 91, stating: "My mom took us to school all her life and she taught us to pray Psalm 91 every time we left home in the mornings, those were words of protection."

== Commercial performance ==
On the US Billboard Hot 100 chart dated July 29, 2023, the song debuted at number 63. On the chart dated August 26, 2023, following the release of Mañana Será Bonito (Bichota Season), the song reached a new peak of number 45.

On the US Billboard Hot Latin Songs chart dated July 29, 2023, the song debuted at number 10. On the chart dated August 26, 2023, the song reached a new peak of number 6.

On the Billboard Global 200 the song debuted at number 43 on the chart dated July 29, 2023.

== Awards and nominations ==
Awards and nominations for "S91"
Year	Ceremony	Category	Result	Ref.
2024	Heat Latin Music Awards	Best Music Video	Won	
2024	Latin Grammy Awards	Best Urban Fusion/Performance	Nominated	
2025	BMI Latin Awards	Award Winning Song	Won	

== Music video ==
The music video for "S91" was directed by Pedro Artola and was released on Karol G's YouTube channel on July 13, 2023. It features Karol G running through a desert, while a mob of people follow her. After that, it cuts to her competing with a man in a driving competition. It ends with multiple shots of a church and Giraldo reciting the Psalm 91 verse.

== Live performances ==
Karol G performed the song live for the first time at the Lollapalooza music festival on August 4, 2023. From August 10, 2023, to July 23, 2024, Karol G embarked on the arena-stadium Mañana Será Bonito Tour, where "S91" was present throughout the set list.

== Charts ==
Chart performance for "S91"
Chart (2023)	Peak position
Argentina Hot 100 (Billboard)	97
Bolivia (Monitor Latino)	9
Central America (Monitor Latino)	11
Chile (Billboard)	10
Colombia (Billboard)	4
Costa Rica (Monitor Latino)	7
Dominican Republic (Monitor Latino)	1
Dominican Republic (SodinPro)	15
Ecuador (Billboard)	11
El Salvador (Monitor Latino)	8
Global 200 (Billboard)	43
Guatemala (Monitor Latino)	11
Honduras (Monitor Latino)	7
Latin America (Monitor Latino)	3
Panama (Monitor Latino)	7
Peru (Billboard)	16
Spain (Promusicae)	22
US Billboard Hot 100	45
US Hot Latin Songs (Billboard)	6
US Latin Airplay (Billboard)	47
US Latin Rhythm Airplay (Billboard)	18
Venezuela (Monitor Latino)	16

== Certifications ==
Certifications for "S91"
Region	Certification	Certified units/sales
Brazil (Pro-Música Brasil)	Gold	20,000^{‡}
Spain (Promusicae)	2× Platinum	120,000^{‡}
United States (RIAA)	6× Platinum (Latin)	360,000^{‡}
^{‡} Sales+streaming figures based on certification alone.
