= Primera Cita (song) =

2023 single by Carín León

Single by Carín León

from the album Colmillo de Leche
- Language: Spanish
- Released: April 20, 2023
- Genre: Regional Mexican; country; soul
- Length: 3:06
- Label: Socios Music
- Songwriter: Alejandro Lozano
- Producers: Carín León; Orlando Aispuro

Carín León singles chronology
"Mil Maneras de Morir" (2023)	"Primera Cita" (2023)	"Me Haces Tan Bien" (2023)

Music video
- "Primera Cita" on YouTube

"Primera Cita" (transl. "First date") is a song by Mexican singer-songwriter Carín León, released on April 20, 2023, as the fifth single from his third studio album Colmillo de Leche (2023). It was written by Alejandro Lozano and produced by León and Orlando Aispuro.

== Background ==
In an interview with Rolling Stone, Carín León stated that when Alejandro Lozano showed him the song it was in a completely different style, and added:

I really wanted to make music with a touch similar to the beginnings of blues and soul; I wanted to go back to the sounds of Memphis and New Orleans. That's how this song came about, obviously with the marrow of the Mexican regional and accompanied by a theme very much from the north of the country. Everything happened naturally, with a flash of creativity, and with the work in the studio with Orlando Aispuro, my producer, and all the people who help me.

León also told Billboard, "This song is a surprise for us since it was an experiment for our Tiny Desk recording — we made a little soul and fused it with regional Mexican to create something exciting." In another interview with Billboard, he stated:

It is a significant song, which today is giving us some exciting surprises that people are connecting a lot with this song. I had wanted to make a soul of doing this mid-century theme for a while. The guitars have all been through amplifiers with a slightly dark sound. More focused on feeling with some lyrics by Mr. Alejandro Lozano, proudly Hermosillense and who has a very northern theme.

== Composition ==
The song, which combines elements of regional Mexican, R&B and soul music, has themes of love and freedom. Lyrically, it is about the stages of a certain romantic relationship, starting from the first date.

== Critical reception ==
Griselda Flores of Billboard had a positive reaction to the song, writing "The track spotlights his soul-deep raspy vocals and his ability to convey feelings through his songs and melodies with more traditional Mexican sounds. If you're a Carin Leon fan, this will not disappoint."

== Music video ==
An official music video was released alongside the single. With respect to it, Carín León told Rolling Stone, "I started to get an idea around the song because it talks a lot about freedom and moments that are immeasurable. He remembers his first date and has a completely free approach, whether it is sexual, romantic or affective; all located in Tijuana, one of the freest cities in Mexico. The story talks about an internal claim to deprive himself of freedom."

== Charts ==
=== Weekly charts ===
Weekly chart performance for "Primera Cita"
Chart (2023)	Peak position
Bolivia (Billboard)	8
Colombia (Billboard)	11
Ecuador (Billboard)	7
Global 200 (Billboard)	28
Mexico (Billboard)	2
Peru (Billboard)	12
US Billboard Hot 100	97
US Hot Latin Songs (Billboard)	13

=== Year-end charts ===
2023 year-end chart performance for "Primera Cita"
Chart (2023)	Position
Global 200 (Billboard)	189
US Hot Latin Songs (Billboard)	54

2024 year-end chart performance for "Primera Cita"
Chart (2024)	Position
Global 200 (Billboard)	179

== Certifications ==
Certifications for "Primera Cita"
Region	Certification	Certified units/sales
Mexico (AMPROFON)	2× Diamond+2× Platinum	1,680,000^{‡}
United States (RIAA)	28× Platinum (Latin)	1,680,000^{‡}
^{‡} Sales+streaming figures based on certification alone.
