= Mi Ex Tenía Razón =

Single by Karol G

from the album Mañana Será Bonito (Bichota Season)
- Language: Spanish
- English title: "My Ex Was Right"
- Released: August 11, 2023
- Recorded: 2023
- Genre: Cumbia; Tex-mex
- Length: 2:34
- Label: Bichota; Interscope
- Songwriter(s): Édgar Barrera; Carolina Giraldo Navarro; Andrés Jael Correa Ríos; Kevyn Mauricio Cruz Moreno; Marco Daniel Borrero
- Producer(s): MAG; Édgar Barrera

Karol G singles chronology
"Tá OK (Remix)" (2023)	"Mi Ex Tenía Razón" (2023)	"Qlona" (2023)

Music video
- "Mi Ex Tenía Razón" on YouTube

"Mi Ex Tenía Razón" (transl. "My Ex Was Right") is a song by Colombian singer-songwriter Karol G. It was written by Karol G, Keityn, Rios, MAG, and Édgar Barrera, and produced by the latter two. The song was released on August 11, 2023, through Bichota Records and Interscope, as the second single from her second mixtape, Mañana Será Bonito (Bichota Season).

== Background ==
On July 31, 2023, Karol G announced the release date of her new mixtape Mañana Será Bonito (Bichota Season). On August 7, 2023, Giraldo revealed the track list, where "Mi Ex Tenía Razón" was featured. The song was released on August 11, 2023, as the second single from the project, alongside the mixtape's release.

In an interview with Apple Music, Karol G revealed that the song takes inspiration from the singer Selena, to whom Giraldo has always been inspired by. She explained:

I'm a big fan of Selena Quintanilla. She is and will continue to be a big motivation factor in my career and personal life. [This] song is very special because it has that Tejano vibe. [In] the video, I am wearing a Selena Quintanilla shirt. With this song, I want to share my great admiration, love, and respect I have for her and her music.

== Commercial performance ==
On the US Billboard Hot 100 chart dated August 26, 2023, the song debuted at number 22, selling 2,000 copies. It became the highest charting Spanish song by a female soloist, surpassing her own "Provenza".

On the US Billboard Hot Latin Songs chart dated August 26, 2023, the song debuted at number 1, becoming Karol G's seventh number one on the chart, the second overall solo female song to debut number one, first since Gloria Estefan's "Hotel Nacional" in 2012. On the Billboard Global 200 the song debuted at number 13 on the chart dated August 26, 2023.

== Awards and nominations ==
Awards and nominations for "Mí Ex Tenía Razón"
Year	Ceremony	Category	Result	Ref.
2024	Billboard Latin Music Awards	Sales Song of the Year	Nominated	
2024	Billboard Latin Music Awards	Latin Airplay Song of the Year	Won	
2024	Heat Latin Music Awards	Song of the Year	Won	
2024	Latin Grammy Awards	Record of the Year	Nominated	
2024	Latin Grammy Awards	Song of the Year	Nominated	
2024	MTV Video Music Awards	Best Latin	Nominated	
2024	Premios Nuestra Tierra	Best Popular Song	Nominated	
2025	BMI Latin Awards	Award Winning Song	Won	

== Music video ==
The music video for "Mi Ex Tenía Razón" was directed by Pedro Artola and was released on Karol G's YouTube channel on August 11, 2023.

== Live performances ==
From August 10, 2023, to July 23, 2024, Karol G embarked on the arena-stadium Mañana Será Bonito Tour, where "Mi Ex Tenía Razón" was present throughout the set list.

== Charts ==
=== Weekly charts ===
Chart performance for "Mi Ex Tenía Razón"
Chart (2023)	Peak position
Argentina (Argentina Hot 100)	17
Argentina (Monitor Latino)	1
Bolivia (Billboard)	5
Bolivia (Monitor Latino)	2
Central America (Monitor Latino)	1
Chile (Billboard)	5
Chile (Monitor Latino)	1
Colombia (Billboard)	1
Colombia (Monitor Latino)	1
Costa Rica (Monitor Latino)	1
Dominican Republic (Monitor Latino)	2
Ecuador (Billboard)	2
Ecuador (Monitor Latino)	1
El Salvador (Monitor Latino)	1
Global 200 (Billboard)	13
Guatemala (Monitor Latino)	2
Honduras (Monitor Latino)	2
Mexico (Billboard)	13
Mexico (Monitor Latino)	1
Nicaragua (Monitor Latino)	3
Panama (Monitor Latino)	2
Paraguay (Monitor Latino)	1
Peru (Hot 100 Perú)	1
Peru (Monitor Latino)	1
Puerto Rico (Monitor Latino)	8
Spain (PROMUSICAE)	14
Uruguay (Monitor Latino)	2
US Billboard Hot 100	22
US Hot Latin Songs (Billboard)	1
US Latin Airplay (Billboard)	1
US Regional Mexican Airplay (Billboard)	17
Venezuela (Monitor Latino)	17

=== Year-end charts ===
2023 year-end chart performance for "Mi Ex Tenía Razón"
Chart (2023)	Position
Argentina (Monitor Latino)	42
Bolivia (Monitor Latino)	10
Central America (Monitor Latino)	37
Chile (Monitor Latino)	33
Colombia (Monitor Latino)	6
Costa Rico (Monitor Latino)	30
Dominican Republic (Monitor Latino)	32
Ecuador (Monitor Latino)	23
El Salvador (Monitor Latino)	23
Guatemala (Monitor Latino)	30
Honduras (Monitor Latino)	76
Latin America (Monitor Latino)	11
Mexico (Monitor Latino)	11
Nicaragua (Monitor Latino)	43
Panama (Monitor Latino)	79
Paraguay (Monitor Latino)	31
Peru (Monitor Latino)	14
Puerto Rico (Monitor Latino)	49
Uruguay (Monitor Latino)	47
US Hot Latin Songs (Billboard)	43
US (TopHit)	174

2024 year-end chart performance for "Mi Ex Tenía Razón"
Chart (2024)	Position
Spain (PROMUSICAE)	96
US Hot Latin Songs (Billboard)	28
US Latin Airplay (Billboard)	3

== Certifications ==
Certifications for "Mi Ex Tenía Razón"
Region	Certification	Certified units/sales
Canada (Music Canada)	Gold	40,000^{‡}
Spain (PROMUSICAE)	2× Platinum	120,000^{‡}
United States (RIAA)	6× Platinum (Latin)	360,000^{‡}
^{‡} Sales+streaming figures based on certification alone.

== See also ==
- List of Billboard Hot Latin Songs and Latin Airplay number ones of 2023
