= MC IG =

- Also known as: Igor Gulherme, MC IG
- Born: Guilherme Sérgio Ramos de Souza; 12 May 1997 (age 29); São Paulo, Brazil
- Genres: Funk paulista
- Occupations: Singer; Composer; Businessman

Guilherme Sérgio Ramos de Souza (born 12 May 1997), better known by his artistic name MC IG, is a Brazilian singer, composer, and businessman. He became known for his singles “3 Dias Virados”, “Goodnight menina”, and his 2023 collaboration in “Let’s go 4”.

== Career ==
MC IG was born on 12 May 1997, and is from the northern São Paulo neighborhood of Vila Medeiros. He released his first song, the EP MC IG, in 2015. He began to gain popularity in 2018 with the song "3 Dias Virados", from his album Lavagem Cerebral, which passed 200 million views on YouTube. Through the record label GR6 Music, he released three projects: Diamante (2020), with songs such as "Pela Marginal" and "Lembra"; O que o Igor Guilherme Anda Pensando (2022), made up of tracks such as "Noite Paulista", "OQIGAP?" and "Goodnight Menina"; and Ninguém Tá Puro (2023), with "Noite Fria". In 2023, he signed with Warner Music Brasil and released the album Meu Nome Não É Igor %.

In 2023, "Let's Go 4", which features MC IG, was on the most played list for digital platforms in Brazil for four months, being on top of the list for three months for Brazilian music on Spotify.

== Discography ==
=== Albums ===
- MC IG (2015)
- Lavagem Cerebral (2018)
- Diamante (2020)
- O que o Igor Guilherme Anda Pensando ? (2022)
- Ninguém Tá Puro! (2023)
- Meu Nome Não É Igor % (2023)
- Todo Mundo Odeia o IG (2024)
- Bad Boys (2024)
- Dr. Igor Guilherme (2024)
- Feliz no Simples (2025)
- Feliz no Simples (Parte 2) (2025)
- Quem tá vivo tá vivendo (2026)
