= Según Quién =

Single by Maluma and Carín León

from the album Don Juan
- Language: Spanish
- English title: "According to Who"
- Released: August 17, 2023
- Recorded: 2023
- Genre: Regional Mexican; Latin pop
- Length: 2:22
- Label: Sony Latin
- Songwriters: Édgar Barrera; Juan Luis Londoño Arias; Kevyn Mauricio Cruz; Lenin Yorney Palacios; Luis Miguel Gómez Castaño
- Producers: Barrera; Keityn; L.E.X.V.Z; Casta

Maluma singles chronology
"Tá OK" (remix) (2023)	"Según Quién" (2023)	"Trofeo" (2023)

Carín León singles chronology
"La Justiciera" (2023)	"Según Quién" (2023)	"Te Lo Agradezco" (2023)

Music video
- "Según Quién" on YouTube

"Según Quién" (Spanish for "According to Who") is a song by Colombian singer Maluma and Mexican singer Carín León. It was released on August 17, 2023, through Sony Music Latin, as the ninth single from Maluma's sixth álbum, Don Juan (2023).

== Composition and lyrics ==
The song is a regional Mexican track that combines elements of Latin pop. It is accompanied by the instrumentalization of acoustic guitars and trumpets. It was written by Maluma, Édgar Barrera, Kevyn Cruz Moreno, Lenin Yorney Palacios and Luis Miguel Gómez Castaño. The lyrics is about two friends who claim that their romantic stories from the past have already been overcome, but rumors around them speculate the opposite.

== Commercial performance ==
The song turned out to be a commercial success on radio stations in Colombia and Mexico, where it ranked first. The single also managed to become one of the musical trends on the TikTok platform, in which it accumulated three billion views and more than a million videos created with the sound. On YouTube, the track reached the first position on the world song list, while on Spotify Mexico it entered the top 10.

In the week of October 2, 2023, "Según Quién" debuted at position number 83 on the Billboard Hot 100 and reached its peak on the week of November 4, managing to position itself at number 68. In addition, the song entered the Billboard Argentina Hot 100 chart, ranking at number 77.

== Music video ==
A music video was released simultaneously with the single on August 17, 2023 on Maluma's official YouTube channel.

== Live performances ==
On October 5, 2023, Maluma and Carín León presented "Según Quién", for the first time live, on the American morning show Good Morning America. That same day, the Colombian artist performed the song again on the American late-night show The Tonight Show Starring Jimmy Fallon.

== Charts ==
=== Weekly charts ===
Weekly chart performance for "Según Quién"
Chart (2023–2024)	Peak position
Argentina (Argentina Hot 100)	53
Bolivia (Billboard)	1
Bolivia (Monitor Latino)	4
Central America (Monitor Latino)	1
Chile (Billboard)	17
Chile (Monitor Latino)	2
Colombia (Billboard)	2
Colombia (Monitor Latino)	1
Colombia (National-Report)	1
Costa Rica (FONOTICA)	2
Costa Rica (Monitor Latino)	2
Dominican Republic (Monitor Latino)	14
Ecuador (Billboard)	2
Ecuador (Monitor Latino)	14
El Salvador (Monitor Latino)	2
Global 200 (Billboard)	17
Guatemala (Monitor Latino)	6
Honduras (Monitor Latino)	9
Latin America (Monitor Latino)	3
Mexico (Billboard)	5
Mexico (Monitor Latino)	2
Nicaragua (Monitor Latino)	1
Panama (Monitor Latino)	15
Panama (PRODUCE)	26
Paraguay (Monitor Latino)	3
Peru (Billboard)	5
Peru (Monitor Latino)	6
Romania Airplay (Media Forest)	7
Romania TV Airplay (Media Forest)	10
Spain (PROMUSICAE)	54
Uruguay (Monitor Latino)	9
US Billboard Hot 100	65
US Hot Latin Songs (Billboard)	7
US Latin Airplay (Billboard)	1
US Regional Mexican Airplay (Billboard)	15
Venezuela Urban (Monitor Latino)	15

=== Monthly charts ===
Monthly chart performance for "Según Quién"
Chart (2023)	Peak position
Paraguay Airplay (SGP)	14

=== Year-end charts ===
2024 year-end chart performance for "Según Quién"
Chart (2024)	Position
Global 200 (Billboard)	77
Romania Airplay (TopHit)	35
US Hot Latin Songs (Billboard)	16

2025 year-end chart performance for "Según Quién"
Chart (2025)	Position
Romania Airplay (TopHit)	190

== Certifications ==
Certifications for "Según Quién"
Region	Certification	Certified units/sales
Mexico (AMPROFON)	Diamond+Platinum+Gold	910,000^{‡}
Spain (Promusicae)	2× Platinum	120,000^{‡}
United States (RIAA)	13× Platinum (Latin)	780,000^{‡}
^{‡} Sales+streaming figures based on certification alone.

== Release history ==
Release dates and formats of "Según Quién"
Region	Date	Format(s)	Label	Ref.
Various	August 17, 2023	Digital download; streaming	Sony Music Latin	

== See also ==
- List of Billboard Hot Latin Songs and Latin Airplay number ones of 2024
