= Kevin O Chris =

Brazilian singer

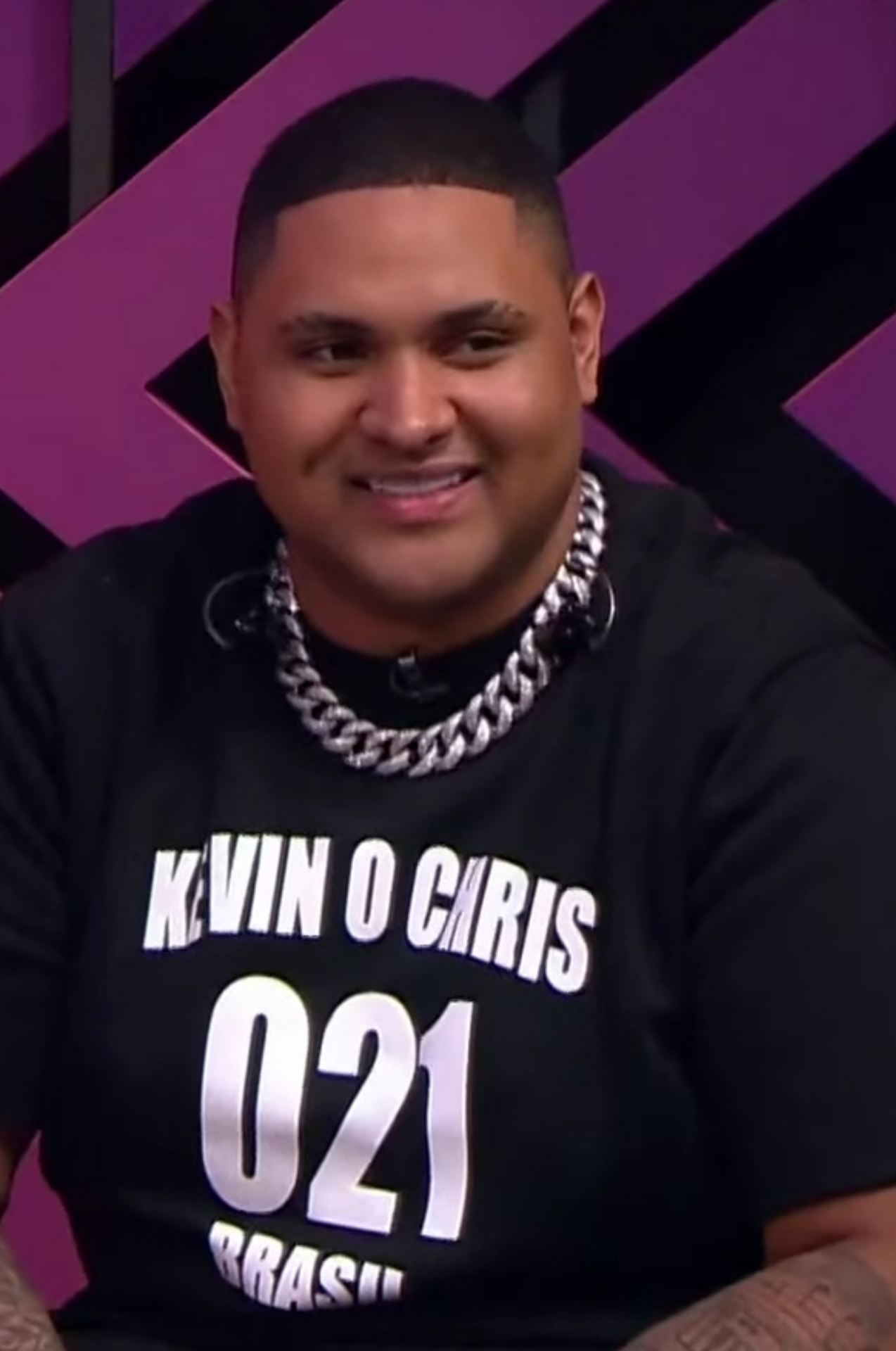
- Kevin in 2023

Background information
- Born: Kevin de Oliveira Zanoni; 5 December 1996 (age 29); Duque de Caxias, Rio de Janeiro, Brazil
- Genres: Funk carioca
- Occupations: Singer; songwriter
- Years active: 2018–present
- Labels: Som Livre (2019–present)

Kevin de Oliveira Zanoni (Brazilian Portuguese: [ˈkɛvĩ dʒi oliˈve(j)ɾɐ zɐˈnoni]; born 5 December 1996), better known by his stage name Kevin o Chris (pronounced [ˈkɛvĩ u ˈkɾis]), is a Brazilian funk singer from Rio de Janeiro, known as one of the main representatives of the 150 BPM style.

== Career ==
Kevin started his career in the funk world in 2014, as a DJ at parties in the city of Duque de Caxias, where he was born and raised, adopting the stage name of DJ Kevin and working in a duet with DJ Davizinho. The nickname came from Kevin and Davizinho's resemblance to the characters Chris and Greg from the series Everybody Hates Chris, Kevin being called "Kevin o Chris" (a name he adopts to this day) and Davizinho called "Davizinho o Greg". (also used by him still today).

In 2018, Kevin o Chris became one of the main artists of the funk carioca genre known as "funk 150 BPM", made up of faster beats than the traditional ones4, and of the party "Baile da Gaiola", originally from Complexo da Penha. One of his first hits was the song "Dentro do Carro", which used the sample of "Day Tripper", by the english band The Beatles, and was made available as a "single" on the last day of 2018.

The first song by Kevin o Chris to reach the top of the Brazilian music charts was "Vamos pra Gaiola", in reference to Baile da Gaiola and with the participation of DJ FP from Trem Bala, which in February 2019 reached the apex of the national charts of the Spotify.
