= Premio Lo Nuestro 2024 =

36th Lo Nuestro Awards
- Date: February 22, 2024
- Site: Kaseya Center, Miami, Florida, United States
- Hosted by: Galilea Montijo; Clarissa Molina; Angélica Vale

Highlights
- Most wins: Karol G (9)
- Most nominations: Maluma (14)

Television/radio coverage
- Network: Univision

The 36th Lo Nuestro Awards was held at the Kaseya Center in Miami on February 22, 2024, to recognize the most popular Spanish-language music of 2023. The ceremony was broadcast on Univisión and hosted by Mexican television presenter Galilea Montijo, Dominican model Clarissa Molina and Mexican actress Angélica Vale.

The nominations were announced on January 22, 2024, with Maluma leading with fourteen nominations, followed by Peso Pluma with thirteen, Grupo Frontera with ten, and Karol G and Feid, both with nine. Voting for the winners was opened on nomination day on the awards page, being available to vote until February 2, 2024. Following the nominations announcement, the recipients for the special awards were also announced: Lifetime Achievement Award for Mexican singer Ana Bárbara, Global Icon Award for Puerto Rican singer Don Omar, and Excellence Award for Puerto Rican singer Olga Tañón.

== Performers ==
Below is the list of the live performances of the artists and the songs they performed:

Artist(s)	Performed
Diego Torres	"Mejor Que Ayer"
Victor Manuelle	"Otra Noche Más"
Maluma	"Según Quién" / "Bling Bling" (with Grupo Marca Registrada & Octavio Cuadras)
Chayanne	"Tiempo De Vals" / "Bailando Bachata"
Anitta	"Bellakeo" / "Bota Niña" (with Bad Gyal) / "Mil Veces"
Carin León Feat. Kane Brown	"The One (Pero No Como Yo)"
Gente de Zona & Celia Cruz	"Ella Tiene Fuego" / "La Negra Tiene Tumbao"
Gloria Trevi	"Y Que Soporten" (with Banda MS de Sergio Lizárraga) / "Medusa"
Don Omar	"Dale Don Dale" / "Dile" / "Pobre Diabla" / "Nadie Como Tú" (with Wisin & Yandel) / "Salió El Sol" (with Anitta) / "Danza Kuduro" (with Machine Gun Kelly)
Camilo	"Gordo" / "Plis" (with Evaluna Montaner)
Pepe Aguilar	"Hasta Que Me Duermo"
Ilegales	"La Morena" / "Como Un Trueno" / "Fiesta Caliente" / "Chucucha" / "Sueño Contigo" / "El Taqui Taqui"
Ricardo Montaner	"Tan Enamorados"
Eladio Carrión	"La Canción Más Feliz Del Disco" (with Milo J) / "Bendecido"
Yuridia Ft. Ángela Aguilar	"Que Agonía"
Olga Tañón	"Es Mentiroso" / "La Vida da Vuelta" / "Los Celos Se Te Notan" / "La Gran Fiesta" / "Muchacho Malo"
Grupo Frontera	"ALV" (with Arcángel) / "Quédate Bebé"
Don Omar Ft. Wisin & Yandel	"Sandunga"
Ana Bárbara	"Fruta Prohibida" / "Brujería" / "Cómo Me Haces Falta" / "Loca" / "Me Asusta Pero Me Gusta" / "Bandido" / "Lo Busqué" (with Carin León)
Emilia	"No Se Ve" / "La Original" (with Tini)
Natti Natasha	"Ya No Te Extraño (Mambo Version)"

== Winners and nominees ==
The nominees were announced on January 22, 2024. Winners appear first and highlighted in bold.

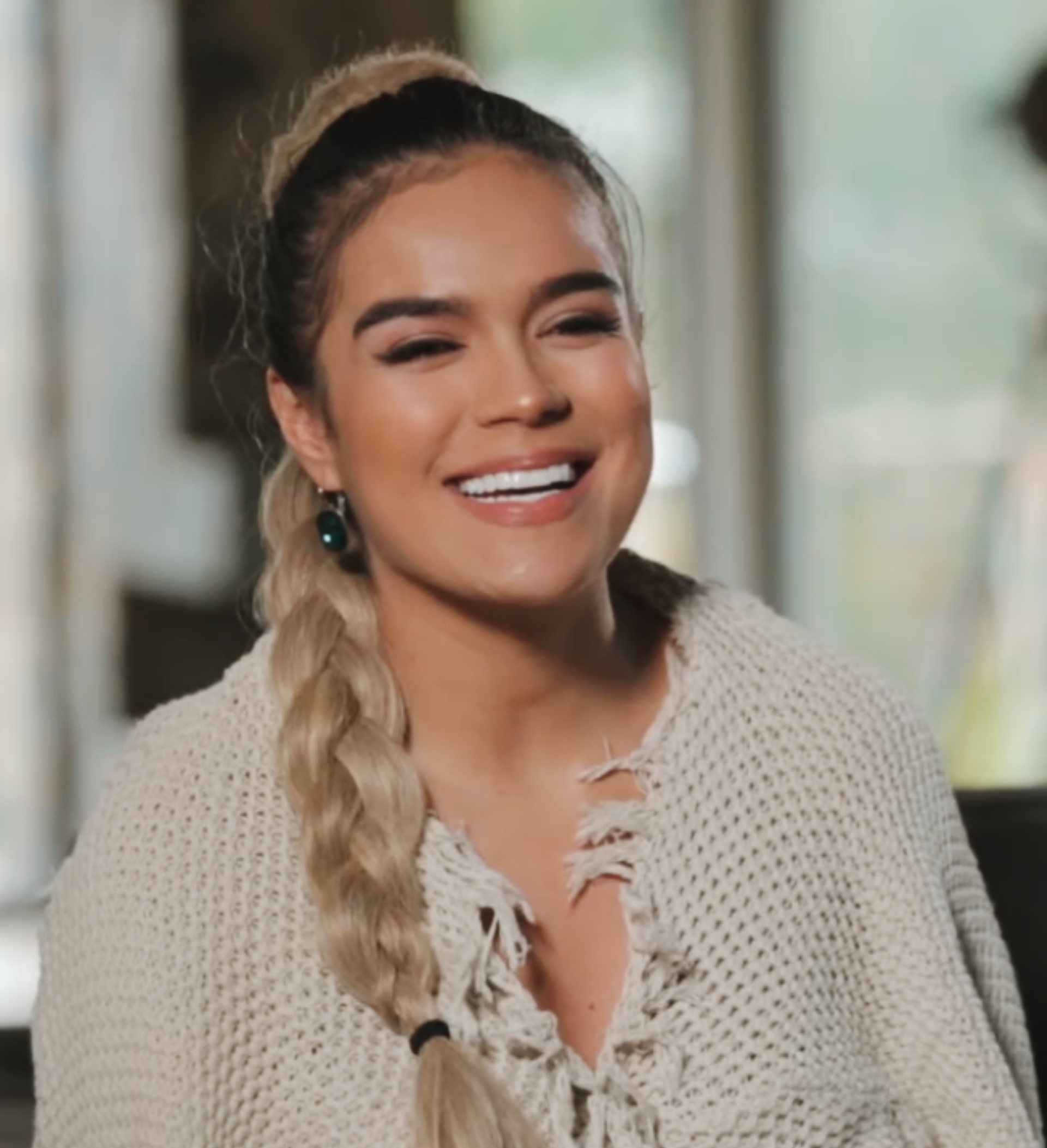
Karol G, Artist of the Year, Album of the Year, Tour of the Year, Female Urban Artist and Urban Album winner and Remix of the Year, Urban Collaboration, Urban/Pop Song and Urban Dance/Pop Song co-winner

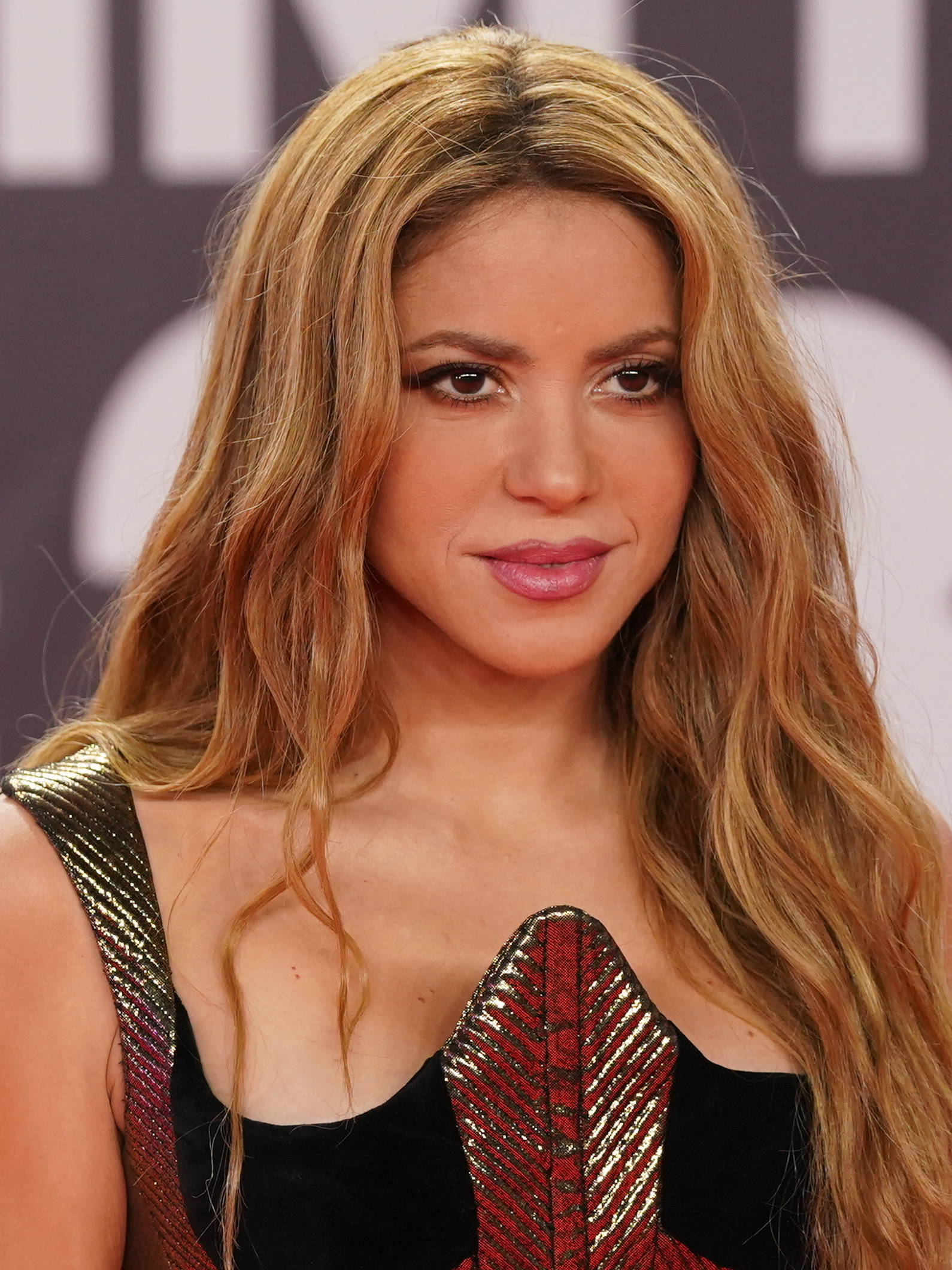
Shakira, Song of the Year and Urban/Pop Collaboration of the Year co-winner and Female Pop Artist of the Year winner

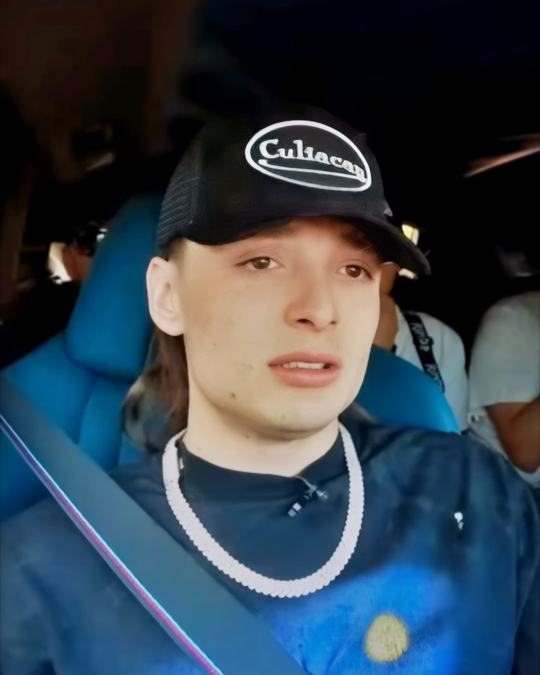
Peso Pluma, New Artist – Male winner

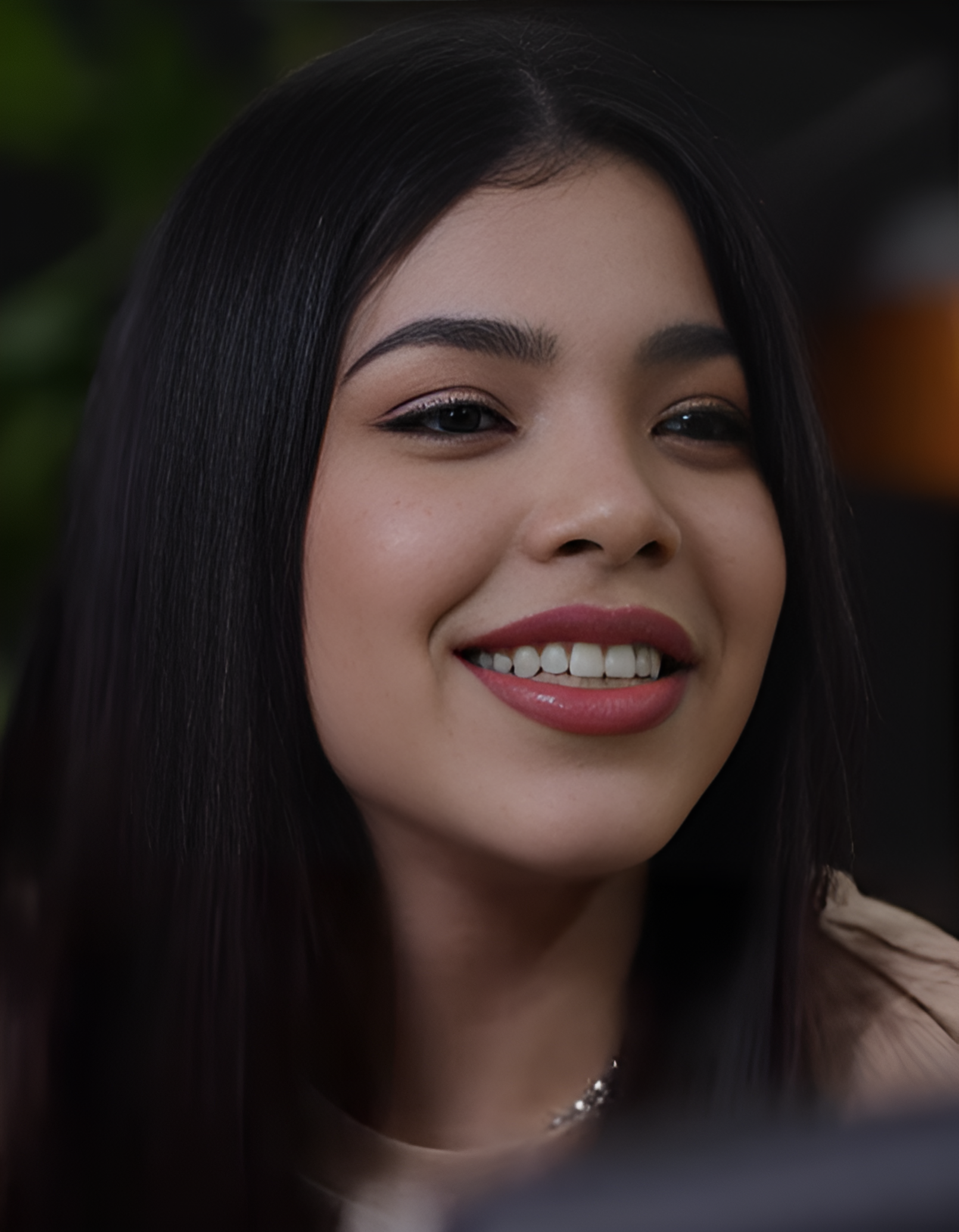
Kenia Os, New Artist – Female winner

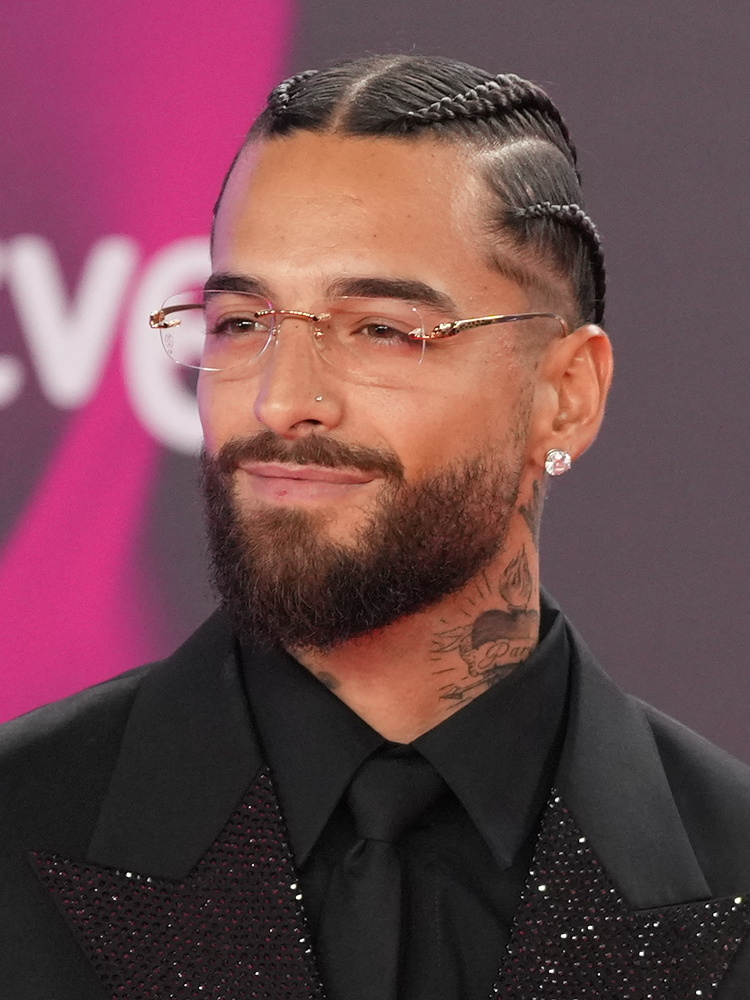
Maluma, Male Pop Artist of the Year winner and The Perfect Mix of the Year, Urban Dance/Pop Song of the Year and Regional Mexican Collaboration of the Year co-winner

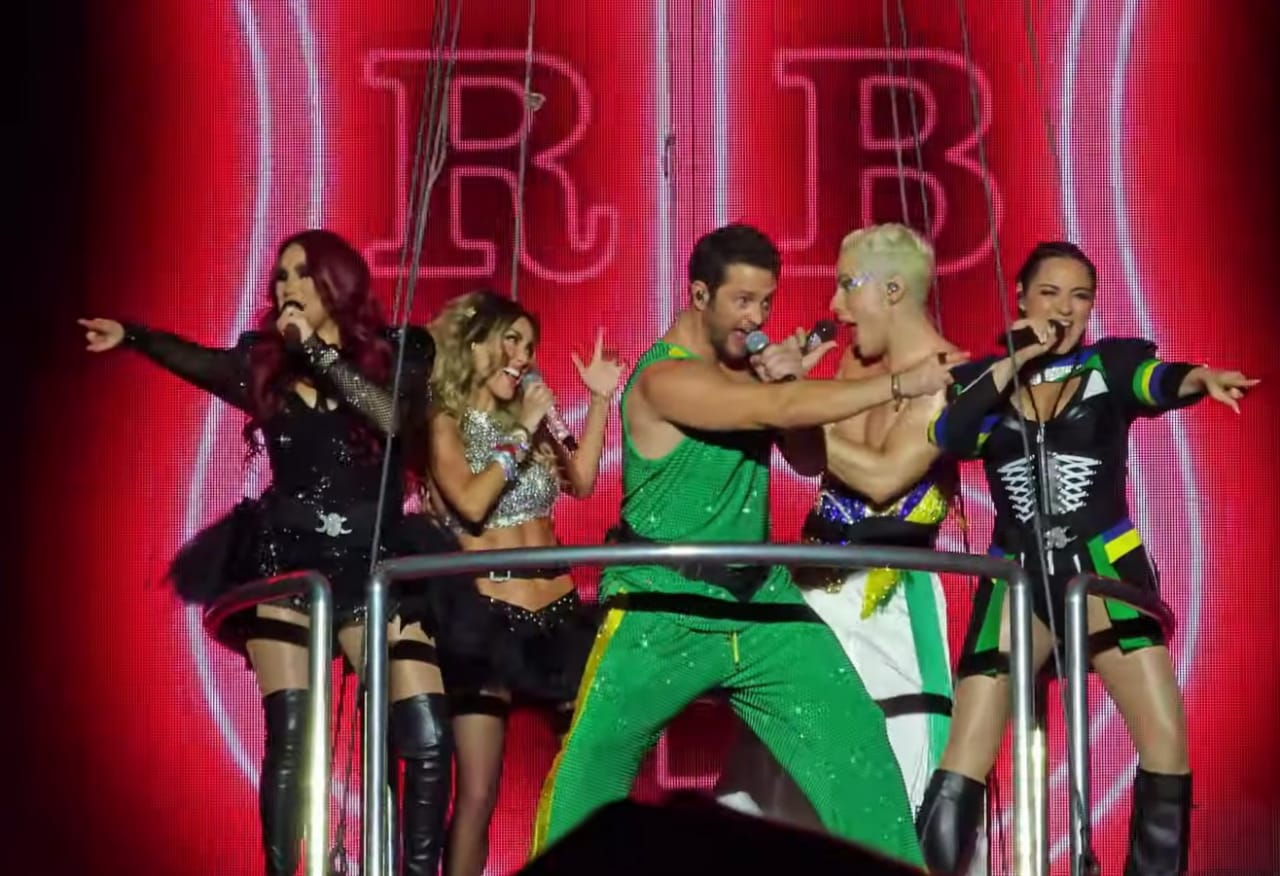
RBD, Pop Group or Duo of the Year winner

=== General ===
**Artist of the Year**: **Karol G**; Bad Bunny; Camilo; Carín León; Feid; Grupo Frontera; Maluma; Ozuna; Peso Pluma; Shakira	**Album of the Year**: **Mañana Será Bonito – Karol G**; Colmillo de Leche – Carín León; Don Juan – Maluma; El Comienzo – Grupo Frontera; Escalona Nunca Se Había Grabado Así – Carlos Vives; Feliz Cumpleaños Ferxxo Te Pirateamos el Álbum – Feid; Fórmula, Vol. 3 – Romeo Santos; Génesis – Peso Pluma; Haashtag – Ha*Ash; Playa Saturno – Rauw Alejandro
**Song of the Year**: **"Shakira: Bzrp Music Sessions, Vol. 53" – Bizarrap & Shakira**; "Ambulancia" – Camilo & Camila Cabello; "Despechá" – Rosalía; "Ella Baila Sola" – Eslabon Armado & Peso Pluma; "Lala" – Myke Towers; "Me EnRD" – Prince Royce; "Nunca y Pico" – Yandel, Maluma & Eladio Carrión; "Sé Que Estás Con Él" – Silvestre Dangond, Reik Ft. Boza; "Un x100to" – Grupo Frontera & Bad Bunny; "¿Y Qué Tal Si Funciona?" – Yuridia & Banda MS de Sergio Lizárraga	**Tour of the Year**: **Mañana Será Bonito Tour – Karol G**; Fórmula, Vol. 3: The Tour – Romeo Santos; Luis Miguel Tour 2023–24 – Luis Miguel; Saturno World Tour – Rauw Alejandro; Soy Rebelde Tour – RBD
**New Artist – Male**: **Peso Pluma**; Christian Alicea; Dei V; Michelle Maciel; Milo J; Omar Courtz; Beéle; Rels B; Saiko; Yng Lvcas	**New Artist – Female**: **Kenia Os**; J Noa; Joaquina; Gale; La Joaqui; Ludmilla; PaoPao; Snow Tha Product
**Crossover Collaboration of the Year**: **"Bailar Contigo" – Black Eyed Peas & Daddy Yankee**; "Dientes" – J Balvin, Usher & DJ Khaled; "El Vibe" – Farina & Sean Paul; "Jumpin" – Pitbull & Lil Jon; "Let's Get Crazy! (Mambo Drop)" – Don Omar & Lil Jon; "Ojalá" – The Rudeboyz, Maluma & Adam Levine; "Somos Iguales" – Ozuna, Tokischa, Louchie Lou & Michie One; "The Reason (Latin Version)" – Jonathan Moly & Hoobastank	**The Perfect Mix of the Year**: **"Según Quién" – Maluma & Carín León**; "Alaska" – Camilo & Grupo Firme; "Amor Clandestino" – Maná & Eden Muñoz; "Chanel" – Becky G & Peso Pluma; "Como el Viento" – Luis R Conríquez & Nicky Jam; "El Amor de Mi Vida" – Los Ángeles Azules Feat. María Becerra; "El Pañuelo" – Romeo Santos & Rosalía; "La Siguiente" – Kany García & Christian Nodal; "Peso Pluma: Bzrp Music Sessions, Vol. 55" – Bizarrap & Peso Pluma; "Un x100to" – Grupo Frontera & Bad Bunny
**Remix of the Year**: **"Una Noche en Medellín Remix" – Karol G, Cris Mj & Ryan Castro**; "Podemos Repetirlo (Remix)" – Don Omar, Chencho Corleone & Anuel AA; "Polaris (Remix)" – Saiko, Quevedo, Feid & Mora; "Quédate (Tiësto Remix)" – Bizarrap & Quevedo; "La Bebe (Remix)" – Yng Lvcas & Peso Pluma

=== Pop ===
**Male Pop Artist of the Year**: **Maluma**; Carlos Rivera; Lasso; Luis Fonsi; Camilo; Manuel Medrano; Manuel Turizo; Pedro Capó; Ricky Martin; Sebastián Yatra	**Female Pop Artist of the Year**: **Shakira**; Aitana; Emilia; Gloria Trevi; Kany García; Kenia Os; Laura Pausini; Rosalía; Thalía; Tini
**Pop Group or Duo of the Year**: **RBD**; Camila; Ha*Ash; Piso 21; Reik	**Pop Song of the Year**: **"Mi Salida Contigo" – Ha*Ash & Kenia Os**; "A Mi Lado" – Reik & Rusherking; "Coco Loco" – Maluma; "Como Tú y Yo" – Chayanne; Fugitivos – Camila; "La Falta Que Me Haces" – Natti Natasha; "La Última Canción" – CNCO; "Sincerándome" – Carlos Rivera; "Una Noche Sin Pensar" – Sebastián Yatra; "Volver a Casa" – Pedro Capó
**Pop/Ballad Song of the Year**: **"Te Acuerdas" – Ha*Ash & Reik**; "Hey" – Ana Isabelle; "Tu Salida" – Christian Daniel; "Un Buen Inicio" – Laura Pausini; "Yo No Fumo" – Ricardo Montaner & Carlos Rivera

=== Urban ===
**Male Urban Artist of the Year**: **Feid**; Arcángel; Bad Bunny; Daddy Yankee; Eladio Carrión; Myke Towers; Ozuna; Rauw Alejandro; Ryan Castro; Yandel	**Female Urban Artist of the Year**: **Karol G**; Anitta; Becky G; Chesca; María Becerra; Natti Natasha; Nicki Nicole; Paopao; Villano Antillano; Young Miko
**Urban Album of the Year**: **Mañana Será Bonito – Karol G**; 3MEN2 KBRN – Eladio Carrión; Feliz Cumpleaños Ferxxo Te Pirateamos el Álbum – Feid; La Nena de Argentina – María Becerra; La Sustancia X – Villano Antillano; La Vida Es Una – Myke Towers; LLNM2 – Anuel AA; Ozutochi – Ozuna; Playa Saturno – Rauw Alejandro; Resistencia – Yandel	**Urban Song of the Year**: **"Classy 101" – Feid & Young Miko**; "Besos Moja2" – Wisin & Yandel & Rosalía; "Instagram" – Blessd; "Lala" – Myke Towers; "Más Rica Que Ayer" – Anuel AA, Mambo Kingz & DJ Luian; "Necesidad" – Venesti; "Panties y Brasieres" – Rauw Alejandro & Daddy Yankee; "Un Cigarrillo" – Chencho Corleone; "Where She Goes" – Bad Bunny; "Yandel 150" – Yandel & Feid
**Urban Collaboration of the Year**: **"Gatúbela" – Karol G & Maldy**; "Hey Mor" – Ozuna & Feid; "La Bebe Remix" – Yng Lvcas & Peso Pluma; "La Jumpa" – Arcángel & Bad Bunny; "Lokera" – Rauw Alejandro, Lyanno & Brray; "Mi Exxx" – Wisin & Anuel AA; "Nunca y Pico" – Yandel, Maluma & Eladio Carrión; "Podemos Repetirlo" – Don Omar & Chencho Corleone; "Te Kiero Ver" – Paopao & Jay Wheeler; "Ulala" – Myke Towers & Daddy Yankee	**Urban/Pop Song of the Year**: **"TQG" – Karol G & Shakira**; "5 Estrellas" – Reik & Sech; "Columbia" – Quevedo; "Éxtasis" – Manuel Turizo & María Becerra; "Junio" – Maluma; "Niña Bonita" – Feid & Sean Paul; "No_se_ve.Mp3" – Emilia, Ludmilla & Zecca; "Pasa_je_ro" – Farruko; "To' Esto es Tuyo" – Natti Natasha; "Tucu" – Ozuna & Amarion
**Urban/Pop Album of the Year**: **Cupido – Tini**; 2000 – Manuel Turizo; Desgenerados Mixtape – Mau y Ricky; Don Juan – Maluma; Eva – Lasso; Haashtag – Ha*Ash; La Neta – Pedro Capó; Mi Soundtrack Vol. 1 – Gloria Trevi; Sincerándome – Carlos Rivera; Thalia's Mixtape – Thalía	**Urban/Pop Collaboration of the Year**: **"Shakira: Bzrp Music Sessions, Vol. 53" – Bizarrap & Shakira**; "Berlín" – Zion & Lennox & María Becerra; "Beso" – Rosalía & Rauw Alejandro; "Easy" – Chesca & Dalex; "Esta Vida" – Marshmello & Farruko; "La Loto" – Tini, Becky G & Anitta; "Los Cachos" – Piso 21 & Manuel Turizo; "Sé Que Estás Con Él" – Silvestre Dangond, Reik Ft. Boza; "Tu Recuerdo" – Wisin, Emilia & Lyanno; "Vagabundo" – Sebastián Yatra, Manuel Turizo & Beéle
**Urban Dance/Pop Song of the Year**: **"Tá OK Remix" – Dennis, MC Kevin O Chris, Maluma & Karol G**; "Café con Leche" – Pitbull; "Celular" – Nicky Jam, Maluma & The Chainsmokers; "Berlín" – Zion & Lennox & María Becerra; "Esta Vida" – Marshmello & Farruko; "Let's Get Crazy! (Mambo Drop)" – Don Omar & Lil Jon

=== Tropical ===
**Tropical Artist of the Year**: **Romeo Santos**; Aymée Nuviola; Carlos Vives; Juan Luis Guerra; Luis Figueroa; Marc Anthony; Olga Tañón; Prince Royce; Silvestre Dangond; Víctor Manuelle	**Tropical Album of the Year**: **Fórmula, Vol. 3 – Romeo Santos**; Canciones del Corazón – Olga Tañón; Catarsis – Daniela Darcourt; El Swing del Gran Combo – El Gran Combo de Puerto Rico; Escalona Nunca Se Había Grabado Así – Carlos Vives; Bachata en Vivo, Vol. 2 – Elvis Martínez; Intruso – Silvestre Dangond; Metamorfosis – Jonathan Moly; Voy a Ti – Luis Figueroa; Yo – Christian Alicea
**Tropical Song of the Year**: **"Bailando Bachata" – Chayanne**; "Decidí Tener Pantalones" – Víctor Manuelle; "Me EnRD" – Prince Royce; "Solo Conmigo" – Romeo Santos; "Viernes" – Luis Figueroa; "Yo Le Mentí" – Marc Anthony	**Tropical Collaboration of the Year**: **"El Pañuelo" – Romeo Santos & Rosalía**; "El Merengue" – Marshmello & Manuel Turizo; "Ambulancia" – Camilo & Camila Cabello; "La Fórmula" – Maluma & Marc Anthony; "Las Mujeres" – Carlos Vives & Juanes; "Si Tú Me Quieres" – Fonseca & Juan Luis Guerra

=== Regional Mexican ===
**Male Regional Mexican Artist of the Year**: **Carín León**; Alejandro Fernández; Alfredo Olivas; Christian Nodal; Eden Muñoz; Junior H; Lenin Ramírez; Luis R. Conriquez; Pepe Aguilar; Peso Pluma	**Female Regional Mexican Artist of the Year**: **Yuridia**; Ana Bárbara; Ángela Aguilar; Chiquis; Majo Aguilar
**Regional Mexican Group or Duo of the Year**: **Grupo Frontera**; Banda Los Recoditos; Banda MS de Sergio Lizárraga; Calibre 50; Eslabon Armado; Fuerza Regida; Grupo Firme; Intocable; La Maquinaria Norteña; Los Ángeles Azules	**Regional Mexican New Artist of the Year**: **Grupo Frontera**; Conexión Divina; Eslabon Armado; Fuerza Regida; Los Esquivel; Marca MP
**Regional Mexican Album of the Year**: **Génesis – Peso Pluma**; Bordado a Mano – Ana Bárbara; Colmillo de Leche – Carín León; Consejos Gratis – Eden Muñoz; Cumbia del Corazón – Los Ángeles Azules; Desvelado – Eslabon Armado; El Comienzo – Grupo Frontera; Foragido EP2 – Christian Nodal; Pa Que Hablen – Fuerza Regida; Pa' Luego es Tarde – Yuridia	**Regional Mexican Song of the Year**: **"Ella Baila Sola" – Eslabon Armado & Peso Pluma**; "Alaska" – Camilo & Grupo Firme; "Eres Ese Algo" – La Maquinaria Norteña; "Indispensable" – Carín León; "Inexperto en Olvidarte" – Alejandro Fernández; "Ni con Labios Prestados" – Alfredo Olivas; "No Se Va (En Vivo)" – Grupo Frontera; "Tú y Tú" – Los Ángeles Azules, Cazzu & Santa Fe Klan; "Un Cumbión Dolido" – Christian Nodal; "¿Y Qué Tal Si Funciona?" – Yuridia & Banda MS de Sergio Lizárraga
**Regional Mexican Collaboration of the Year**: **"Según Quién" – Maluma & Carín León**; "Bebe Dame" – Fuerza Regida & Grupo Frontera; "Ella Baila Sola" – Eslabon Armado & Peso Pluma; "Alaska" – Camilo & Grupo Firme; "La Patrona" – Edwin Luna y La Trakalosa de Monterrey & Leantro Ríos; "No Me Hablen de Amor" – Pepe Aguilar & Intocable; "Qué Agonía" – Yuridia Ft. Ángela Aguilar; "Se Acabó (En Vivo)" – Lenin Ramírez, Fuerza Regida & Banda Renovación; "Si Ya Hiciste el Mal" – Luis R. Conriquez & Jessi Uribe; "Solo Que Lo Dudes" – Banda MS de Sergio Lizárraga & Yahritza y Su Esencia	**Norteño Song of the Year**: **"Indispensable" – Carín León**; "Beses a Quien Beses" – La Fiera de Ojinaga; "Cuéntame" – Los Rieleros del Norte; "Dirección Equivocada" – Calibre 50; "Eres Ese Algo" – La Maquinaria Norteña; "Ni Con Labios Prestados" – Alfredo Olivas; "Ni Volviendo a Nacer" – Eden Muñoz; "No Me Hablen de Amor" – Pepe Aguilar & Intocable; "Que Te Vaya Bien" – Julión Álvarez y su Norteño Banda; "Se Me Soltó el Hocico" – Los Dos Carnales
**Banda Song of the Year**: **"¿Y Qué Tal Si Funciona?" – Yuridia Ft. Banda MS de Sergio Lizárraga**; "Al Ver Que Te Vas" – Banda El Recodo; "Amor Pasajero" – Los Plebes del Rancho de Ariel Camacho; "Calidad" – Grupo Firme & Luis Mexia; "Fuerte No Soy" – Banda Los Recoditos; "La Patrona" – Edwin Luna y La Trakalosa de Monterrey & Leantro Ríos; "Se Acabó (En Vivo)" – Lenin Ramírez, Fuerza Regida & Banda Renovación; "Se Manda Sola" – La Adictiva; "Si Ya Hiciste el Mal" – Luis R. Conriquez & Jessi Uribe; "Soldado Caído" – El Fantasma	**Mariachi/Ranchera Song of the Year**: **"Qué Agonía" – Yuridia Ft. Ángela Aguilar**; "Difícil Tu Caso" – Alejandro Fernández; "La Jugada" – Ana Bárbara & Vicente Fernández; "No Puedo No Caer" – Leonardo Aguilar; "Canción Para Olvidarte" – Majo Aguilar; "Sólo Muere Si Se Olvida" – Adriel Favela & Kurt; "Un Cumbión Dolido" – Christian Nodal
**Regional Mexican Fusion Song of the Year**: **"Ella Baila Sola" – Eslabon Armado & Peso Pluma**; "Cambio de Canción" – Conexión Divina; "Fin de Semana" – Oscar Maydon & Junior H; "Frágil" – Yahritza y Su Esencia & Grupo Frontera; "Mírate Nomás" – Ulices Chaidez

=== Special Merit Awards ===
- Lifetime Achievement Award – Ana Bárbara
- Global Icon Award – Don Omar
- Excellence Award - Olga Tañón
