= List of number-one Billboard Regional Mexican Songs of 2023 =

The Billboard Regional Mexican Songs is a subchart of the Latin Airplay chart that ranks the best-performing songs on Regional Mexican radio stations in the United States. Published weekly by Billboard magazine, it ranks the "most popular regional Mexican songs, ranked by radio airplay audience impressions as measured by Nielsen Music".

== Chart history ==
Issue date	Song	Artist(s)	Ref.
January 7	"Que Te Vaya Bien"	Julión Álvarez y su Norteño Banda	
January 14	"Un Poquito Tuyo"	Intocable	
January 21	"Que Te Vaya Bien"	Julión Álvarez y su Norteño Banda	
January 28	"Que Vuelvas"	Carin León and Grupo Frontera	
February 4	"Que Vuelvas"	Carin León and Grupo Frontera	
February 11	"Que Vuelvas"	Carin León and Grupo Frontera	
February 18	"Que Vuelvas"	Carin León and Grupo Frontera	
February 25	"Eres Ese Algo"	La Maquinaria Norteña	
March 4	"Que Vuelvas"	Carin León and Grupo Frontera	
March 11	"Que Vuelvas"	Carin León and Grupo Frontera	
March 18	"Bebé Dame"	Fuerza Regida and Grupo Frontera	
March 25	"Bebé Dame"	Fuerza Regida and Grupo Frontera	
April 1	"Bebé Dame"	Fuerza Regida and Grupo Frontera	
April 8	"Se Me Solto El Hocico"	Los Dos Carnales	
April 15	"Direccion Equivocada"	Calibre 50	
April 22	"Direccion Equivocada"	Calibre 50	
April 29	"Di Que Sí"	Grupo Marca Registrada and Grupo Frontera	
May 6	"Di Que Sí"	Grupo Marca Registrada and Grupo Frontera	
May 13	"Di Que Sí"	Grupo Marca Registrada and Grupo Frontera	
May 20	"Tu y Tu"	Los Angeles Azules Con Cazzu and Santa Fe Klan	
May 27	"Ella Baila Sola"	Eslabón Armado and Peso Pluma	
June 3	"Un Cumbion Dolido"	Christian Nodal	
June 10	"Ella Baila Sola"	Eslabón Armado and Peso Pluma	
June 17	"Ella Baila Sola"	Eslabón Armado and Peso Pluma	
June 24	"Ella Baila Sola"	Eslabón Armado and Peso Pluma	
July 1	"Que Onda Perdida"	Grupo Firme X Gerardo Coronel	
July 8	"Que Onda Perdida"	Grupo Firme X Gerardo Coronel	
July 15	"Que Onda Perdida"	Grupo Firme X Gerardo Coronel	
July 22	"Te Quiero Ver"	La Maquinaria Nortena	
July 29	"Mentira No Es"	Fuerza Regida & Banda MS	
August 5	"No Es Que Me Quiera Ir"	Alejandro Fernández	
August 12	"Frágil"	Yahritza y su Esencia and Grupo Frontera	
August 19	"Indispensable"	Carín León	
August 26	"Indispensable"	Carín León	
September 2	"Indispensable"	Carín León	
September 9	"La Vida Cara"	El Fantasma	
September 16	"No Se Vale"	Edwin Luna y La Trakalosa de Monterrey	
September 23	"No Se Vale"	Edwin Luna y La Trakalosa de Monterrey	
September 30	"No Se Vale"	Edwin Luna y La Trakalosa de Monterrey	
October 7	"El Amor de Su Vida"	Grupo Frontera and Grupo Firme	
October 14	"El Amor de Su Vida"	Grupo Frontera and Grupo Firme	
October 21	"El Amor de Su Vida"	Grupo Frontera and Grupo Firme	
October 28	"El Amor de Su Vida"	Grupo Frontera and Grupo Firme	
November 4	"Vengo de Verla"	Calibre 50	
November 11	"Amor Clandestino"	Maná and Edén Muñoz	
November 18	"Dificil Tu Caso"	Alejandro Fernández	
November 25	"Bipolar"	Peso Pluma, Jasiel Nuñez and Junior H	
December 2	"Se Buscan Borrachos"	Gerardo Coronel El Jerry	
December 9	"Se Buscan Borrachos"	Gerardo Coronel El Jerry	
December 16	"Según Quién"	Maluma and Carin León	
December 23	"En Altavoz"	Grupo Frontera & Junior H	
December 30	"En Altavoz"	Grupo Frontera & Junior H	
