= 2024 iHeartRadio Music Awards =

Annual US music awards ceremony

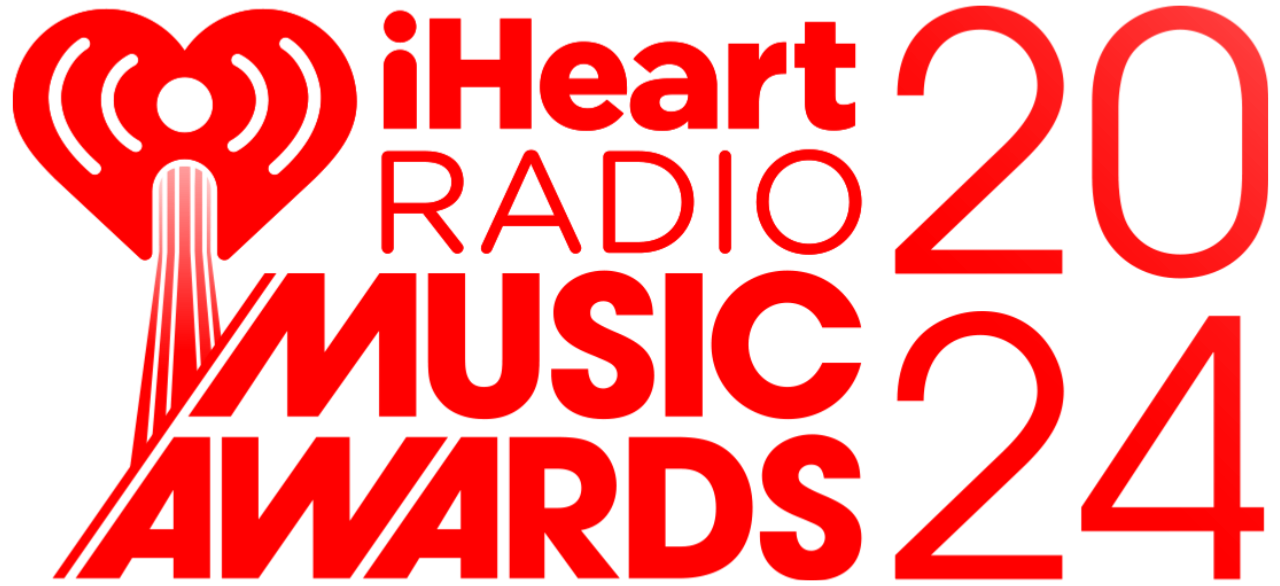
- Date: April 1, 2024
- Location: Dolby Theatre, Los Angeles
- Country: United States
- Hosted by: Ludacris
- Most awards: Taylor Swift (6)
- Most nominations: Taylor Swift (9)
- Website: www.iheart.com/music-awards

Television/radio coverage
- Network: Fox

The 2024 iHeartRadio Music Awards was held at the Dolby Theatre in Los Angeles on April 1, 2024, and broadcast live on Fox. It was hosted by Ludacris.

During the ceremony Cher was honored with the Icon Award for her "unparalleled contributions to music and pop culture for over seven decades". Beyoncé was recognized with the Innovator Award for being a "global cultural icon", who has taken "creative risks, successfully transformed their music and influenced pop culture". TLC and Green Day both received the Landmark Award.

== Performers ==
Performers were announced on March 21, 2024.

Performers at the 2024 iHeartRadio Music Awards
Performer(s)	Song(s)
Justin Timberlake	"Selfish" "No Angels"
Green Day	"Bobby Sox" "Basket Case"
Tate McRae	"Greedy" "Exes"
Jelly Roll Lainey Wilson	"Save Me"
TLC Latto	"No Scrubs" "Waterfalls"
Jennifer Hudson Cher	"If I Could Turn Back Time" "Believe"
Ludacris T-Pain	"Yeah!" "All I Do is Win" "Move Bitch"

== Presenters ==
- Lance Bass and AJ McLean presented the award for Artist of the Year.
- Katy Perry presented the award for Song of the Year
- Niecy Nash-Betts presented the award for Best New Hip-Hop Artist
- T-Pain and Meghan Trainor presented the award for R&B Artist of the Year
- Jared Leto presented the award for Alternative Artist of the Year
- Stevie Wonder presented Beyoncé with the iHeartRadio Innovator Award
- Meryl Streep presented Cher with the iHeartRadio Icon Award
- Avril Lavigne presented Green Day with the iHeartRadio Landmark Award
- GloRilla and Peso Pluma presented TLC with the iHeartRadio Landmark Award

Other presenters for the 2024 iHeartRadio Music Awards included: Jennifer Hudson, JoJo Siwa, Latto, Ravi Patel, Vella Lovell

== Winners and nominees ==
iHeartRadio announced the nominees on January 18, 2024. Socially Voted Categories opened on January 18 and ended on March 25 on iHeartRadio's website. Taylor Swift was the most nominated artist with nine, followed by Jelly Roll, 21 Savage and SZA with eight. For the first time in the history of the awards ceremony, new categories were introduced for pop and K-pop music.

Winners are listed first and in bold.

Song of the Year	Artist of the Year
**"Kill Bill" – SZA**; "Calm Down" – Rema & Selena Gomez; "Creepin'" – Metro Boomin featuring The Weeknd & 21 Savage; "Cruel Summer" – Taylor Swift; "Dance the Night" – Dua Lipa; "Fast Car" – Luke Combs; "Flowers" – Miley Cyrus; "Last Night" – Morgan Wallen; "Paint the Town Red" – Doja Cat; "Vampire" – Olivia Rodrigo	**Taylor Swift**; Drake; Jelly Roll; Luke Combs; Miley Cyrus; Morgan Wallen; Olivia Rodrigo; Shakira; SZA; Usher
Best Duo/Group of the Year	Best Collaboration
**OneRepublic**; (G)I-dle; Blink-182; Dan + Shay; Fall Out Boy; Foo Fighters; Jonas Brothers; Måneskin; Paramore; Parmalee	**"Calm Down" – Rema & Selena Gomez**; "All My Life" – Lil Durk featuring J. Cole; "Barbie World" – Nicki Minaj & Ice Spice featuring Aqua; "Boy's a Liar, Pt. 2" – PinkPantheress & Ice Spice; "Creepin'" – Metro Boomin featuring The Weeknd & 21 Savage; "Good Good" – Usher, Summer Walker & 21 Savage; "Rich Flex" – Drake & 21 Savage; "Thank God" – Kane Brown & Katelyn Brown; "Tomorrow 2" – GloRilla featuring Cardi B; "TQG" – Karol G & Shakira
Pop Artist of the Year	Best New Pop Artist
**Taylor Swift**; Doja Cat; Miley Cyrus; Olivia Rodrigo; SZA	**Jelly Roll**; David Kushner; Doechii; Rema; Stephen Sanchez
Pop Song of the Year	Country Song of the Year
**"Flowers" – Miley Cyrus**; "Calm Down" – Rema & Selena Gomez; "Cruel Summer" – Taylor Swift; "Kill Bill" – SZA; "Vampire" – Olivia Rodrigo	**"Heart Like a Truck" – Lainey Wilson**; "Fast Car" – Luke Combs; "Last Night" – Morgan Wallen; "Rock and a Hard Place" – Bailey Zimmerman; "Thank God" – Kane Brown & Katelyn Brown
Country Artist of the Year	Best New Country Artist
**Morgan Wallen**; Jason Aldean; Jelly Roll; Lainey Wilson; Luke Combs	**Jelly Roll**; Corey Kent; Jackson Dean; Megan Moroney; Nate Smith
Hip-Hop Artist of the Year	Best New Hip-Hop Artist
**Drake**; 21 Savage; Future; Gunna; Lil Durk	**Ice Spice**; Doechii; Lola Brooke; Sexyy Red; Young Nudy
Hip-Hop Song of the Year	R&B Song of the Year
**"Snooze" – SZA**; "Creepin'" – Metro Boomin featuring The Weeknd & 21 Savage; "Cuff It" – Beyoncé; "Good Good" – Usher, Summer Walker & 21 Savage; "On My Mama" – Victoria Monét	**"All My Life" – Lil Durk featuring J. Cole**; "FukUMean" – Gunna; "Just Wanna Rock" – Lil Uzi Vert; "Rich Flex" – Drake & 21 Savage; "Tomorrow 2" – GloRilla featuring Cardi B
R&B Artist of the Year	Best New R&B Artist
**SZA**; Beyoncé; Brent Faiyaz; Chris Brown; Usher	**Victoria Monét**; Coco Jones; Fridayy; Kenya Vaun; October London
Alternative Artist of the Year	Best New Alternative/Rock Artist
**Fall Out Boy**; Blink-182; Foo Fighters; Green Day; Paramore	**Noah Kahan**; Bad Omens; Hardy; Jelly Roll; Lovejoy
Alternative Song of the Year	Rock Song of the Year
**"One More Time" – Blink-182**; "Lost" – Linkin Park; "Love from the Other Side" – Fall Out Boy; "Rescued" – Foo Fighters; "This Is Why" – Paramore	**"Lost" – Linkin Park**; "72 Seasons" – Metallica; "Dead Don't Die" – Shinedown; "Need a Favor" – Jelly Roll; "Rescued" – Foo Fighters
Rock Artist of the Year	Dance Artist of the Year
**Foo Fighters**; Disturbed; Jelly Roll; Metallica; Shinedown	**Tiësto**; Anabel Englund; David Guetta; Illenium; Kylie Minogue
Dance Song of the Year	Latin Pop/Reggaeton Song of the Year
**"Strangers" – Kenya Grace**; "10:35" – Tiësto featuring Tate McRae; "Baby Don't Hurt Me" – David Guetta, Anne-Marie & Coi Leray; "Padam Padam" – Kylie Minogue; "Praising You" – Rita Ora featuring Fatboy Slim	**"Shakira: Bzrp Music Sessions, Vol. 53" – Shakira & Bizarrap**; "La Bachata" – Manuel Turizo; "La Bebé (Remix)" – Yng Lvcas & Peso Pluma; "Lala" – Myke Towers; "TQG" – Karol G & Shakira
Latin Pop/Reggaeton Artist of the Year	Best New Latin Artist
**Karol G**; Bad Bunny; Feid; Manuel Turizo; Shakira	**Young Miko**; Bad Gyal; GALE; Mora; Yng Lvcas
Afrobeats Artist of the Year	Regional Mexican Artist of the Year
**Burna Boy**; Rema; Tems; Tyla; Wizkid	**Peso Pluma**; Calibre 50; Carín León; El Fantasma; Grupo Frontera
Regional Mexican Song of the Year	K-Pop Song of the Year
**"Ella Baila Sola" – Eslabon Armado & Peso Pluma**; "Bebe Dame" – Fuerza Regida & Grupo Frontera; "Indispensable" – Carin León; "Qué Onda Perdida" – Grupo Firme featuring Gerardo Coronel; "Que Vuelvas" – Carin León & Grupo Frontera	**"Cupid (Twin Version)" – Fifty Fifty**; "Bouncy (K-Hot Chilli Peppers)" – Ateez; "S-Class" – Stray Kids; "Seven" – Jung Kook featuring Latto; "Super Shy" – NewJeans
K-Pop Artist of the Year	Best New K-Pop Artist
**Jung Kook**; (G)I-dle; NCT Dream; Seventeen; Stray Kids	**NewJeans**; BoyNextDoor; Riize; Xikers; Zerobaseone
Producer of the Year	Songwriter of the Year
**Jack Antonoff**; Carter Lang; Dan Nigro; Kid Harpoon; Rob Bisel	**Ashley Gorley**; Aldae; J Kash; Jack Antonoff; Michael Ross Pollack
Album of the Year (per genre)
Alternative: **The Record – Boygenius**; Hip Hop: **Heroes & Villains – Metro Boomin**; K-Pop: **5-Star – Stray Kids**; Latin Pop/Urban: **Mañana Será Bonito – Karol G**; Pop: **Guts – Olivia Rodrigo**; Rock: **72 Seasons – Metallica**; R&B: **SOS – SZA**

=== Socially voted categories ===
Best Music Video	Best Lyrics
**"Seven" – Jung Kook featuring Latto**; "3D" – Jung Kook featuring Jack Harlow; "Dance the Night" – Dua Lipa; "Flower" – Jisoo; "Flowers" – Miley Cyrus; "I'm Good (Blue)" – Bebe Rexha & David Guetta; "Kill Bill" – SZA; "La Bebé (Remix)" – Yng Lvcas & Peso Pluma; "Paint the Town Red" – Doja Cat; "TQG" – Karol G & Shakira; "Vampire" – Olivia Rodrigo; "What Was I Made For?" – Billie Eilish	**"Is It Over Now?" – Taylor Swift**; "Dial Drunk" – Noah Kahan; "Flowers" – Miley Cyrus; "Greedy" – Tate McRae; "Houdini" – Dua Lipa; "Last Night" – Morgan Wallen; "Lovin on Me" – Jack Harlow; "Nonsense" – Sabrina Carpenter; "Paint the Town Red" – Doja Cat; "Vampire" – Olivia Rodrigo; "Water" – Tyla; "What Was I Made For?" – Billie Eilish
Best Fan Army	Social Star Award
**BTS Army**; Agnation; ATINY; Barbz; Beyhive; Harries; Livies; Louies; Niallers; Rushers; Selenators; Swifties	**Gracie Abrams**; Alex Warren; David Kushner; Flyana Boss; Jessie Murph; Megan Moroney; Natalie Jane; Noah Kahan
Favorite Tour Photographer	Favorite Tour Style
**Louis Tomlinson – Joshua Halling**; 5 Seconds of Summer – Ryan Fleming; Adele – Ravie B; Beyoncé – Mason Poole; Charlie Puth – Carianne Older; Coldplay – Anna Lee; Jonas Brothers – Cynthia Parkhurst; Kelsea Ballerini – Catherine Powell; MisterWives – Matty Vogel; Morgan Wallen – David Lehr; Sabrina Carpenter – Alfredo Flores; Shinedown – Sanjay Parikh	**Taylor Swift**; Beyoncé; Carrie Underwood; Doja Cat; Elton John; Harry Styles; Jonas Brothers; Madonna; Måneskin; Sabrina Carpenter; Shania Twain; SZA
Favorite Debut Album	Favorite On Screen
**Layover – V**; Golden – Jung Kook; In Pieces – Chloe Bailey; Lucky – Megan Moroney; Mirror – Lauren Spencer-Smith; My 21st Century Blues – Raye; Religiously – Bailey Zimmerman; Snow Angel – Reneé Rapp; Tyler Hubbard – Tyler Hubbard	**“j-hope IN THE BOX” – J-Hope**; “Love To Love You, Donna Summer” – Donna Summer; “Louis Tomlinson: All of Those Voices” – Louis Tomlinson; “Prince: The Final Secret” – Prince; “Renaissance: A Film by Beyoncé” – Beyoncé; “Save Me” – Jelly Roll; “Taylor Swift: The Eras Tour” – Taylor Swift; “TLC Forever" – TLC
TikTok Bop of the Year
**"Cruel Summer" – Taylor Swift**; "Boy's a Liar, Pt. 2" – PinkPantheress & Ice Spice; "Collide (Sped Up Remix)" – Justine Skye; "Cupid (Twin Version)" – Fifty Fifty; "Daylight" – David Kushner; "Her Way (Sped Up)" – PartyNextDoor; "If We Ever Broke Up" – Mae Stephens; "Paint the Town Red" – Doja Cat; "Water" – Tyla; "What It Is (Solo Version)" – Doechii; "What Was I Made For?" – Billie Eilish

=== Special awards ===
Tour of the Year	iHeartRadio Innovator
**The Eras Tour – Taylor Swift**	**Beyoncé**
iHeartRadio Icon Award	iHeartRadio Landmark Award
**Cher**	**Green Day**; **TLC**
