= Jugando a Que No Pasa Nada =

Studio album by Grupo Frontera
- Released: May 10, 2024
- Genre: Norteño cumbia; country; Sinaloan sierreño; tribal guarachero; R&B
- Length: 37:06
- Language: Spanish
- Label: Self-released
- Producer: Edgar Barrera; Casta

Grupo Frontera chronology
El Comienzo (2023)	Jugando a Que No Pasa Nada (2024)	Mala Mía (2024)

Singles from Jugando a Que No Pasa Nada
- 1. "Quédate Bebé" Released: February 15, 2024; 2. "Ya Pedo Quién Sabe" Released: March 7, 2024; 3. "No Hay Vato Perfecto" Released: May 8, 2024; 4. "Por Qué Será" Released: May 22, 2024; 5. "Desquite" Released: July 17, 2024

Jugando a Que No Pasa Nada (English: Pretending That Nothing's Wrong) is the second studio album by American regional Mexican band Grupo Frontera, self-released on May 10, 2024. Production for the album was handled Edgar Barrera and Casta. A 12-track album with fusions of country, electronic music, among other genres, it features guest appearances by Maluma, Nicki Nicole, Christian Nodal and Morat.

The album was first announced during a cover interview with The Fader, where the band sought to experiment other genres. Its release date was eventually revealed when a trailer in collaboration with Japanese–American media franchise Transformers was published on May 8, 2024. Four accompanying singles from the album were released; "Quédate Bebé", "Ya Pedo Quién Sabe", "No Hay Vato Perfecto" and "Por Qué Será".

== Background and recording ==
On the band's debut album, El Comienzo (2023), which contains hit singles such as "Un x100to" and "El Amor de Su Vida", they felt that it was "rushed" and did not want to change their cumbia music style. They eventually revealed during a cover interview with The Fader that their second album would be an experimental album, with songs containing incorporations of R&B, pop and bachata. Nicki Nicole would later confirm in an interview that she would collaborate with the band. "Quédate Bebé" and "Nunca La Olvide" were recorded before live performances, where they recorded them onstage before crowds entered. The remainder of the album was recorded within four to five days.

== Musical style ==
=== Overview ===
With most of the production done solely by Edgar Barrera, Jugando a Que No Pasa Nada compromises of regional Mexican and Tejano music, with incorporations of country, electronic, pop, and R&B. The band considers Shakira as an inspiration for the album because of her "different styles" on the album Las Mujeres Ya No Lloran, where they collaborated on "(Entre Paréntesis)", and "felt empowered to experiment in a similar sense". With the album's themes revolving around romance and heartbreak, other inspirations for the album include 3Ball MTY, George Strait and Morgan Wallen.

=== Songs ===
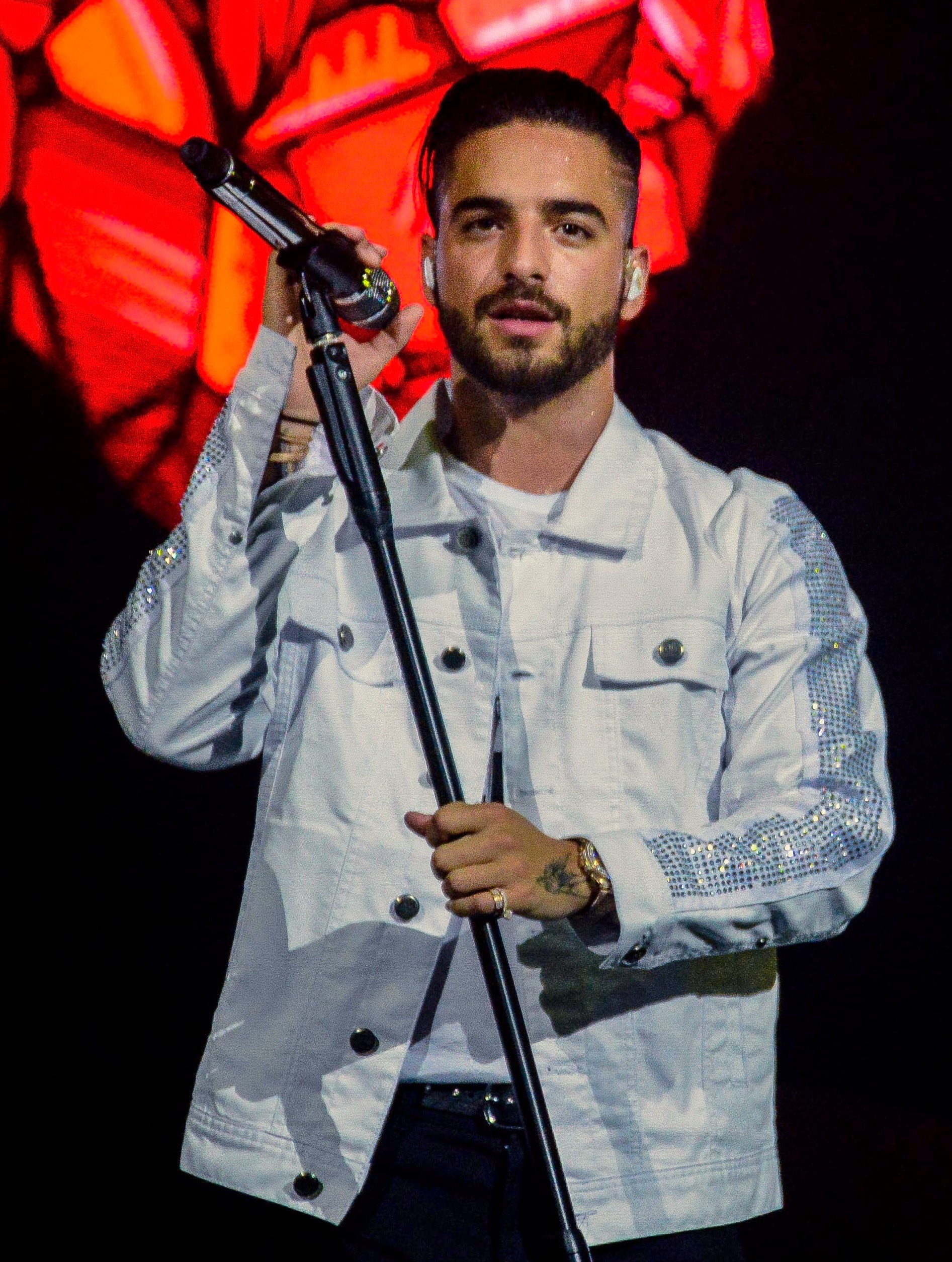
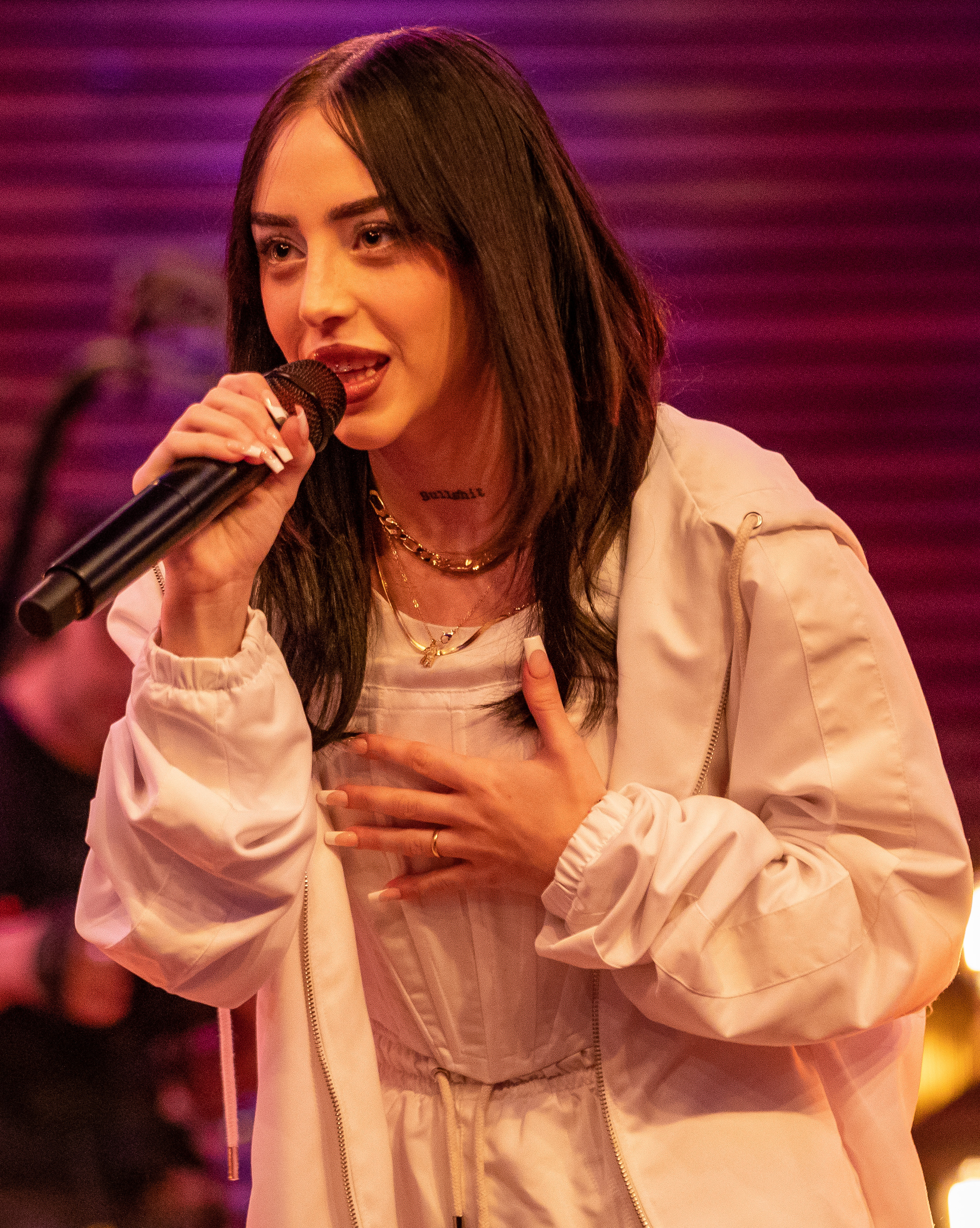
Maluma (left) appears on "Por Qué Será" and Nicki Nicole (right) appears on "Desquite", respectively.

The album begins with "F*ckin Amor", which is a sierreño track where the lead singer Adelaido "Payo" Solís III sings about heartbreak. Its next track, "Por Qué Será", featuring Colombian singer Maluma, is a norteño cumbia about heartbreak and how relationships end badly. "Desquite" with Argentinian singer Nicki Nicole is about a failed relationship where the other partner was unfaithful, and getting revenge on them. "Me Hizo un Favor" is an R&B mid-tempo ballad, which was originally intended to be a cumbia song. The band fuses a norteño cumbia with elements of Latin pop on its next track, "Los Dos" with Colombian band Morat. "Ya Pedo Quién Sabe" with Mexican singer Christian Nodal is a slow country ballad with the addition of accordion.

The album's seventh track, "No Hay Vato Perfecto" is a ballad sung over a guitar instrumental. The next track, "Echándote de Menos" is a mid-tempo country song with accordion, in which Solís sings about a relationship that is still thought about after it ended. Its following tracks, "Nunca La Olvidé" and "No Sé Que Paso", are about losing a woman's love, eventually parting each other's ways. The next track "Ibiza" revolves around a guy already having "everything he want[ed]" and having enough [money]" for his partner. The album's twelfth and final track, "Quédate Bebé" is another norteño cumbia, in which Solís, musically, begs to his partner that they stay in their relationship.

== Release and promotion ==
The band released "Quédate Bebé" as the album's lead single on February 15, 2024, a day after Valentine's Day. "Ya Pedo Quién Sabe" with Christian Nodal was released as the second single for Jugando a Que No Pasa Nada on March 7, 2024. The band performed it on The Tonight Show Starring Jimmy Fallon in April 2024 and eventually peaked at number one on the US Regional Mexican Airplay chart in its seventh week. In the same month, the band performed the then-unreleased song "Los Dos" with Morat during their live show at the 2024 Festival Estéreo Picnic, where they also performed their hit single "No Se Va". The band released a trailer for the album on May 8, 2024, in collaboration with Japanese–American media franchise Transformers to present their new pet, with "No Hay Vato Perfecto" being released on the same day as its third single.

Jugando a Que No Pasa Nada was released for digital download and streaming on May 10, 2024. Days after the album was released, the band announced their concert tour to promote it, Jugando a Que No Pasa Nada Tour. It would debut at number 198 on the Billboard 200, number 36 on US Independent Albums, number 10 on US Top Latin Albums, and number six on US Regional Mexican Albums. Being its first post-album single, "Por Qué Será" with Maluma would be released as the album's fourth single on May 22, 2024.

== Artwork and title ==
The album's artwork includes a broken-down truck on fire in the middle of a desert, with a faceless cowboy, who "represents Grupo Frontera", sitting on the car's hood. Its title, Jugando a Que No Pasa Nada, either translates to "Pretending That Nothing's Wrong" or "Pretending Everything Is Okay" in English. Solís stated that the cowboy seen in the artwork is sitting on the truck as if "nothing's wrong", and also used an example that relates to the title:

You're pretending to be fine and then once you get in your car and you pass yourself the aux, you turn that up and you start bawling, or feeling whatever you're feeling. Then the album's over, gotta [sic] get back to work, clock back in, and go back to pretending everything's fine.

== Critical reception ==
Andrew Sacher of BrooklynVegan, in their review of the album, stated that Jugando a Que No Pasa Nada "still has a lot of [acoustic sounds] but it brings in some more modern sounds too" and the "multi-genre approach is something [Grupo Frontera] did very intentionally". The album also received a nomination for the Latin Grammy Award for Best Contemporary Mexican Music Album at the 25th Annual Latin Grammy Awards.

== Track listing ==
Jugando a Que No Pasa Nada track listing
No.	Title	Writer(s)	Producer(s)	Length
1.	"F*ckin Amor"	Alex Hernandez; Edgar Barrera; Ivan Gamez	Edgar Barrera	3:11
2.	"Por Qué Será" (with Maluma)	Barrera; Juan Luis Londoño; Kevyn Mauricio Cruz	Barrera	3:29
3.	"Desquite" (with Nicki Nicole)	Barrera; Cruz; Luis Miguel Castaño; Nicole Denise Cucco	Barrera; Casta	3:22
4.	"Me Hizo un Favor"	Andrés Jael Correa Rios; Barrera; Castaño; Cruz; Manuel Lorente	Barrera; Casta	2:36
5.	"Los Dos" (with Morat)	Andrés Torres; Barrera; Juan Pablo Isaza; Juan Pablo Villamil; Martin Vargas; Mauricio Rengifo; Simon Vargas	Barrera	3:34
6.	"Ya Pedo Quién Sabe" (with Christian Nodal)	Barrera; Diego Bollella Urtusastegui; Horacio Palencia; Nathan Galante	Barrera	3:11
7.	"No Hay Vato Perfecto"	Barrera	Barrera	3:20
8.	"Echándote de Menos"	Alex Luna; Barrera; Elena Rose; Castaño; Lorente	Barrera	3:06
9.	"Nunca La Olvidé"	Barrera; Correa Rios; Lorente	Barrera	2:43
10.	"No Sé Qué Pasó"	Barrera; Cruz	Barrera	2:29
11.	"Ibiza"	Adelaido Solis; Barrera; Gamez; Hernandez	Barrera	2:52
12.	"Quédate Bebé"	Benjamin Levin; Barrera; Kevyn Cruz	Barrera	3:13
Total length:				37:06

== Charts ==
Chart performance for Jugando a Que No Pasa Nada
Chart (2024)	Peak position
US Billboard 200	198
US Independent Albums (Billboard)	36
US Regional Mexican Albums (Billboard)	6
US Top Latin Albums (Billboard)	10
