= Carín León =

Mexican musician (born 1989)

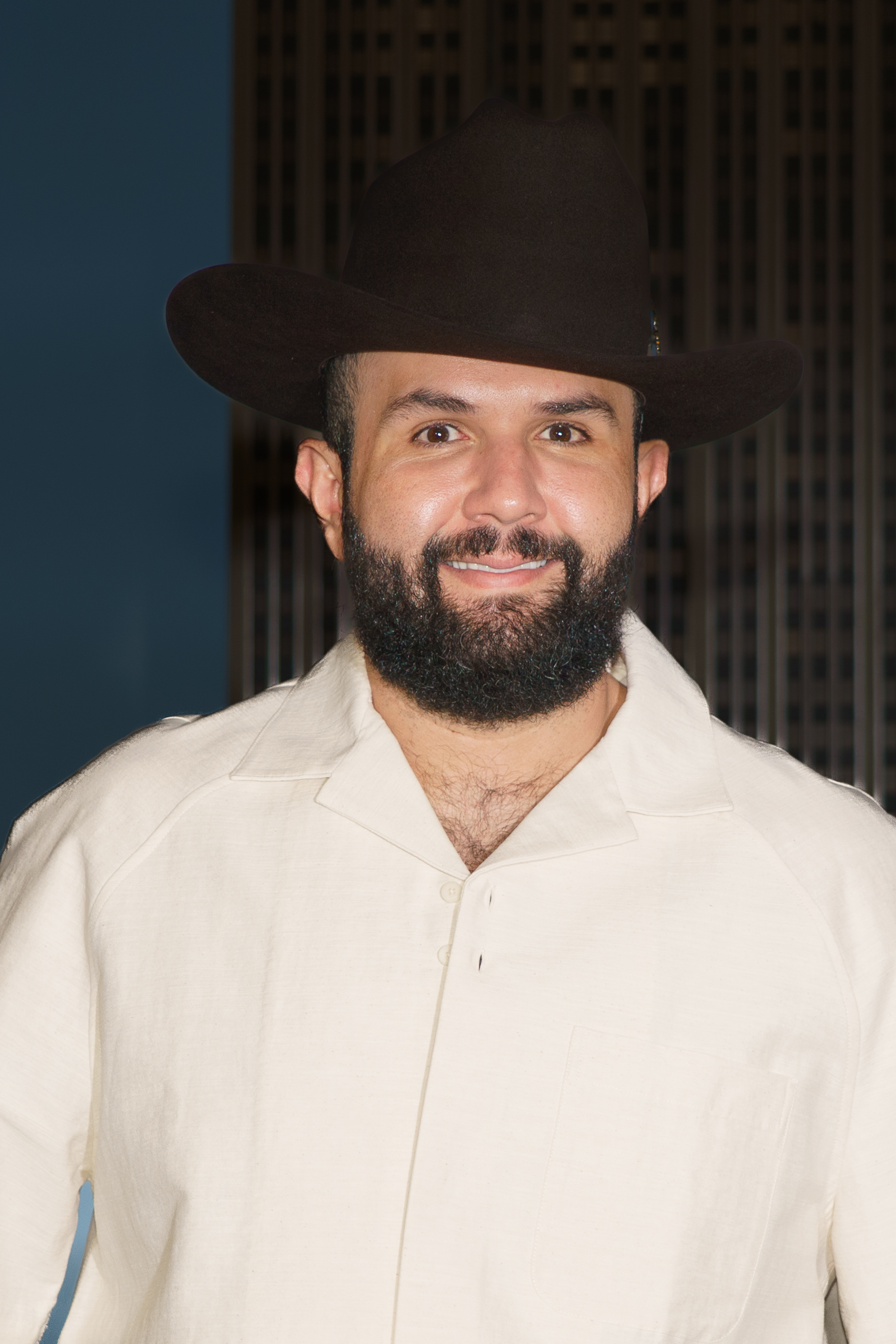
- León in 2026

Background information
- Born: Óscar Armando Díaz de León Huez; 26 July 1989 (age 37); Hermosillo, Sonora, Mexico
- Genres: Banda; mariachi; norteño; norteño with sax; sierreño; technobanda; grupero; country; soul; blues; R&B; pop; rock; vallenato; salsa; flamenco
- Instruments: Vocals; guitar; bajo sexto
- Years active: 2010–present
- Labels: Tamarindo Rekordsz (2018–2022); Socios Music (2022–present)

Óscar Armando Díaz de León Huez (born 26 July 1989), known professionally as Carín León, is a Mexican singer-songwriter who specializes in regional Mexican music. He has recorded songs in several of its subgenres, as well as incorporated influence from other musical genres.

== Career ==
León began playing the guitar at age 15. His first band was Los Reales before founding Grupo Arranke with four friends in 2010. The group gained traction with their song "A Través del Vaso". He was a member of Grupo Arranke for seven years until starting a solo career in 2018. His career took off with his solo version of "A Través del Vaso". His other songs "Me La Avente" and "Tú", a cover of the 1999 song by Noelia, both charted on Billboard's Hot Latin Songs, Latin Airplay, and Regional Mexican Airplay charts. In 2021, he also released a cover of "More Than Words" by Extreme and later a version of "Moscas en la Casa" by Shakira, which was part of his album Pistiembre Todo El Año.

During the global shutdown of major venues and concert halls due to the COVID-19 pandemic, León pivoted into podcasts, alternative radio, and emerging platforms for greater distribution. This was also in large part thanks to the dramatic overall increase in interest in regional Mexican music globally, as noted by Spotify. León appeared on NPR's 'Tiny Desk' on September 19, 2022.

León won the Latin Grammy Award for Best Regional Mexican Song in 2022 for the song "Como lo Hice Yo" alongside Edgar Barrera and Matisse. In 2022, he was the third most streamed Mexican artist on Spotify.

His single "Que Vuelvas" with Grupo Frontera was number one for six weeks on the Regional Mexican Airplay chart in 2023. León won his second Latin Grammy in 2023; this time for the Best Norteño Album with his third studio album, Colmillo de Leche.

On February 23, 2024, León made his debut performance in one of country music's most prestigious venues, the Grand Ole Opry in Nashville, Tennessee. On April 14, 2024, León debuted at the Coachella Valley Music and Arts Festival in California during its first weekend. Six days later, he was presented with the key to the City of Coachella by the city council. The next day, León again performed at the Coachella Festival during its second weekend. On April 26, León debuted at Coachella's country music-themed sister festival, Stagecoach. On October 4, 2024, León made his debut at the Austin City Limits Music Festival in Zilker Park. The following day, he debuted on Austin City Limits at the Moody Center. León received his third Latin Grammy in 2024; this time winning the inaugural one for Best Contemporary Mexican Music Album with his fourth studio album, Boca Chueca, Vol. 1. Said album also won the Grammy Award for Best Música Mexicana Album in 2025.

On February 26, 2025, León debuted at the Viña del Mar International Song Festival in Chile, where he received the Silver and Golden Gaviota awards. On March 9, 2025, León made his debut at Rodeo Houston, where he performed in front of 70,603 fans. On May 16, 2025, León appeared on NPR's 'Tiny Desk' for a second time. León received his fourth Latin Grammy in 2025; winning Best Contemporary Mexican Music Album for the second year in a row, this time with his album Palabra de To's (Seca). Said album also won the Grammy Award for Best Música Mexicana Album in 2026.

On February 6, 2026, León released a single and a music video, "Love to Be Loved", in collaboration with Mexican rock band The Warning. This song is his first one entirely in English.

On March 14-15, 2026, León launched La Cura Fest, his own annual music festival in his hometown of Hermosillo, Sonora. In addition to León performing both nights as the headliner, the festival featured several artists of genres that have influenced León, such as regional Mexican, country, folk, soul, rock, and pop.

On March 20, 2026, León in collaboration with American country artist Jelly Roll, released the song "Lighter", the first single from the official album of the 2026 FIFA World Cup. The track was produced by Canadian record producer Cirkut, in the process bringing together an individual from each of the three host countries of the tournament.

On March 25, 2026, León in collaboration with entrepreneur Sebastián Chacón Flores and grill master José Ángel Figueroa, opened his own restaurant in Hermosillo, "El Coyote del Norte", which specializes in gourmet tacos.

León became the first regional Mexican artist to headline a concert at Summerfest in Milwaukee, Wisconsin on June 20, 2026 and to headline the Summer Sonic Festival in Japan on August 14-15, 2026.

In September 2026, León became the first Latin artist to perform at the Sphere in Las Vegas, where he held a series of residency concerts. Guest performers included Cody Johnson, Jorge Medina (former La Arrolladora Banda El Limón vocalist turned soloist), The Warning, Ricky Muñoz of Intocable, Kany García, Pepe Aguilar, Lupe Esparza of Bronco, Reik, and Cristian Castro.

== Personal life ==
León was born in Hermosillo, Sonora, to Óscar Díaz de León and Carmen Julia Huez. He has a girlfriend and two children.

== Discography ==
=== Studio albums ===
List of studio albums, with selected chart positions
Title	Details	Peak chart positions			Certifications
Title	Details	US	US Latin	US Reg. Mex.	Certifications
El Malo	Released: August 1, 2019; Format: Digital download, streaming; Label: Tamarindo Rekordsz	—	—	—	RIAA: 3× Platinum (Latin)
Inédito	Released: May 7, 2021; Format: Digital download, streaming; Label: Tamarindo Rekordsz	—	—	—	RIAA: 4× Platinum (Latin)
Colmillo de Leche	Released: May 18, 2023; Format: Digital download, streaming, LP; Label: Socios Music	184	8	5	RIAA: 6× Platinum (Latin)
Boca Chueca, Vol. 1	Released: May 30, 2024; Format: Digital download, streaming, LP, CD; Label: Socios Music	169	8	5	RIAA: 4× Platinum (Latin)
Muda	Released: May 7, 2026; Format: Digital download, streaming, LP, CD; Label: Socios Music				
MudaH - (Deluxe edition of Muda with five new tracks)	Released: October 8, 2026; Format: Digital download, streaming; Label: Socios Music				

=== Live albums ===
- Desvelada con Banda y Mariachi (En Vivo) (2018)
- A Puro Pelo (100 % En Vivo) (2018)
- Pa' las de Vidrio (En Vivo) (2018)
- Amanecida con Todo y con Todos (2018)
- Borrachera con Taka Takas (2020)
- Encerrados Pero Enfiestados (Live Vol. 1) (2020)
- Encerrados Pero Enfiestados (Live Vol. 2) (2020)
- Borrachera con Los Honorables (2020)
- Pistiembre Todo El Año (En Vivo) (2021)
- Cura Local (En Vivo) (2022)
- U.V.V. Vol. 8 (En Vivo) (2023)
- Palabra de To's (2024)
- Palabra de To's (Seca) (2025) – Special edition of Palabra de To's with four new studio tracks
- Chapayeka (En Vivo) (2025)
- Chapayeka (Puro Chucky) (2025)

=== EPs ===
- Colmillo de Leche Live Sessions (En Vivo) (2023)
- Carín León (Live at NPR's Tiny Desk) (2025)
- Live From Japan (2026)

=== Singles ===
==== Charting singles ====
List of singles, with selected chart positions, and album name
Title	Year	Peak chart positions				Album
Title	Year	MEX	BOL Ang. Air.	US	WW	Album
"El Toxico" (with Grupo Firme)	2021	22	—	— (Note: "El Toxico" did not enter the Billboard Hot 100, but peaked at number 13 on the Bubbling Under Hot 100 Singles chart.)	—	Non-album single
"No Es Por Aca"	2022	21	—	—	—	Colmillo de Leche
"Que Vuelvas" (with Grupo Frontera)	2022	2	—	50	34	El Comienzo
"Primera Cita"	2023	2	—	97	28	Colmillo de Leche
"Según Quién" (with Maluma)	2023	5	—	68	17	Don Juan
"Love to Be Loved" (with The Warning)	2026	—	8	—	—	Non-album single
"Lighter (The Official FIFA World Cup 26 Song)" (with Jelly Roll)	2026	–	—	–	–	FIFA World Cup 2026 Official Album
"—" denotes a recording that did not chart or was not released in that territory.

== Awards and nominations ==
List of awards and nominations received by Carín León
Award	Year	Recipient(s) and nominee(s)	Category	Result	Ref.
ASCAP Latin Awards	2021	"Me La Aventé"	Winning Songs	Won	
ASCAP Latin Awards	2022	"El Tóxico" (with Grupo Firme)	Winning Songs	Won	
ASCAP Latin Awards	2024	"Según Quién" (with Maluma)	Winning Songs	Won	
Billboard Latin Music Awards	2022	Himself	Regional Mexican Artist of the Year, Solo	Nominated	
Billboard Latin Music Awards	2022	"El Tóxico" (with Grupo Firme)	Regional Mexican Song of the Year	Nominated	
Billboard Latin Music Awards	2023	Himself	Regional Mexican Artist of the Year, Solo	Nominated	
Billboard Latin Music Awards	2023	"Que Vuelvas" (with Grupo Frontera)	Regional Mexican Song of the Year	Nominated	
Billboard Latin Music Awards	2024	Himself	Regional Mexican Artist of the Year, Solo	Nominated	
Grammy Awards	2025	Boca Chueca, Vol. 1	Best Música Mexicana Album	Won	
Grammy Awards	2026	Palabra de To's (Seca)	Best Música Mexicana Album	Won	
iHeartRadio Music Awards	2024	Himself	Regional Mexican Artist of the Year	Nominated	
iHeartRadio Music Awards	2024	"Indispensable"	Regional Mexican Song of the Year	Nominated	
iHeartRadio Music Awards	2024	"Que Vuelvas" (with Grupo Frontera)	Regional Mexican Song of the Year	Nominated	
iHeartRadio Music Awards	2025	"Alch Si" (with Grupo Frontera)	Regional Mexican Song of the Year	Won	
iHeartRadio Music Awards	2026	Himself	Regional Mexican Artist of the Year	Nominated	
Latin American Music Awards	2021	Himself	Favorite Regional Mexican Artist	Nominated	
Latin American Music Awards	2022	Himself	Favorite Regional Mexican Artist	Nominated	
Latin American Music Awards	2022	"El Tóxico" (with Grupo Firme)	Collaboration of the Year	Nominated	
Latin American Music Awards	2022	"El Tóxico" (with Grupo Firme)	Favorite Regional Mexican Song	Nominated	
Latin American Music Awards	2023	Himself	Favorite Regional Mexican Artist	Nominated	
Latin American Music Awards	2023	"Que Vuelvas" (with Grupo Frontera)	Collaboration of the Year	Nominated	
Latin American Music Awards	2023	"Que Vuelvas" (with Grupo Frontera)	Best Collaboration - Regional Mexican	Nominated	
Latin American Music Awards	2023	"Con un Botecito a Pecho" (with Adriel Favela)	Best Collaboration - Regional Mexican	Nominated	
Latin American Music Awards	2023	"La Boda del Huitlacoche (Live)"	Favorite Regional Mexican Song	Nominated	
Latin American Music Awards	2024	Himself	Artist of the Year	Nominated	
Latin American Music Awards	2024	Himself	Favorite Regional Mexican Artist	Won	
Latin American Music Awards	2024	"Según Quién" (with Maluma)	Song of the Year	Nominated	
Latin American Music Awards	2024	"Según Quién" (with Maluma)	Collaboration of the Year	Nominated	
Latin American Music Awards	2024	Colmillo de Leche	Album of the Year	Nominated	
Latin American Music Awards	2024	Colmillo de Leche	Favorite Regional Mexican Album	Nominated	
Latin American Music Awards	2024	"Indispensable"	Favorite Regional Mexican Song	Nominated	
Latin Grammy Awards	2022	"Como lo Hice Yo" (with Matisse)	Best Regional Mexican Song	Won	
Latin Grammy Awards	2023	Colmillo de Leche	Best Norteño Album	Won	
Latin Grammy Awards	2024	Boca Chueca, Vol. 1	Album of the Year	Nominated	
Latin Grammy Awards	2024	Boca Chueca, Vol. 1	Best Contemporary Mexican Music Album	Won	
Latin Grammy Awards	2024	"Una Vida Pasada" (with Camilo)	Record of the Year	Nominated	
Latin Grammy Awards	2024	"Te Lo Agradezco" (with Kany García)	Song of the Year	Nominated	
Latin Grammy Awards	2024	"Según Quién" (with Maluma)	Song of the Year	Nominated	
Latin Grammy Awards	2025	Palabra de To's (Seca)	Album of the Year	Nominated	
Latin Grammy Awards	2025	Palabra de To's (Seca)	Best Contemporary Mexican Music Album	Won	
Latin Grammy Awards	2025	"Si Tú Me Vieras" (with Maluma)	Best Regional Mexican Song	Nominated	
Latin Grammy Awards	2026	Muda	Album of the Year	Nominated	
Latin Grammy Awards	2026	"Desde Que Te Tengo"	Record of the Year	Nominated	
LOS40 Music Awards	2023	Himself	Best Latin Act	Nominated	
LOS40 Music Awards	2023	"Ni Me Debes Ni Te Debo" (with Camilo)	Best Latin Collaboration	Nominated	
Premios Juventud	2020	Himself	The New Regional Mexican Generation	Nominated	
Premios Juventud	2021	"Tú"	Viral Track of the Year	Nominated	
Premios Juventud	2022	Inédito	Regional Mexican Album of the Year	Nominated	
Premios Juventud	2022	"Como lo Hice Yo" (with Matisse)	Best Regional Mexican Fusion	Nominated	
Premios Juventud	2023	Himself	Male Artist of the Youth	Nominated	
Premios Juventud	2023	Himself	Male Artist on the Rise	Nominated	
Premios Juventud	2023	Himself	My Favorite Streaming Artist	Nominated	
Premios Juventud	2023	"Que Vuelvas" (with Grupo Frontera)	Best Song for My Ex	Nominated	
Premios Juventud	2023	"Que Vuelvas" (with Grupo Frontera)	Best Regional Mexican Collaboration	Nominated	
Premios Juventud	2023	"No Es Por Acá"	Best Regional Mexican Song	Nominated	
Premios Juventud	2023	"Llorar y Llorar" (with Mau y Ricky)	Best Regional Mexican Fusion	Nominated	
Premios Juventud	2024	Himself	Male Artist of the Youth	Won	
Premios Juventud	2024	"Ni Me Debes Ni Te Debo" (with Camilo)	The Perfect Mix	Nominated	
Premios Juventud	2024	"Según Quién" (with Maluma)	The Perfect Mix	Nominated	
Premios Juventud	2024	"Según Quién" (with Maluma)	Best Regional Mexican Fusion	Won	
Premios Juventud	2024	"Indispensable"	Best Regional Mexican Song	Nominated	
Premios Juventud	2024	"Alch Si" (with Grupo Frontera)	Best Regional Mexican Collaboration	Nominated	
Premios Juventud	2024	Colmillo de Leche	Best Regional Mexican Album	Nominated	
Premios Juventud	2025	Himself	Premios Juventud Artist of the Year	Nominated	
Premios Juventud	2025	"El Amor de Mi Herida"	Best Música Mexicana Song	Won	
Premios Juventud	2025	Boca Chueca, Vol. 1	Best Música Mexicana Album	Won	
Premios Juventud	2026	Himself	Premios Juventud Male Artist	Nominated	
Premios Juventud	2026	"Me Está Doliendo" (with Alejandro Fernández)	My Favorite Track	Won	
Premios Juventud	2026	Palabra de To's (Seca)	Album of the Year	Nominated	
Premios Juventud	2026	"We Made It Look Easy / Hicimos Que Pereciera Fácil" (with Bon Jovi)	OMG Collaboration	Nominated	
Premios Juventud	2026	"A Medio Vivir" (with Ricky Martin)	The Perfect Collab	Nominated	
Premios Juventud	2026	De Sonora, Para El Mundo	Best Tour	Nominated	
Premios Juventud	2026	"Vivir Sin Aire" (with Maná)	Best Pop/Rock Song	Nominated	
Premios Juventud	2026	"Déjame Dormir" (with Codiciado)	Best Mexican Music Fusion	Nominated	
Premios Juventud	2026	Palabra de To's (Seca)	Best Mexican Music Album	Won	
