= El Comienzo =

Studio album by Grupo Frontera
- Released: August 3, 2023
- Recorded: 2022–2023
- Genre: Cumbia; norteño
- Length: 34:46
- Language: Spanish
- Label: VHR Music
- Producer: Edgar Barrera; MAG

Grupo Frontera chronology
No Se Va (En Vivo) (2022)	El Comienzo (2023)	Jugando a Que No Pasa Nada (2024)

Singles from El Comienzo
- 1. "No Se Va" Released: April 28, 2022; 2. "Que Vuelvas" Released: December 9, 2022; 3. "Un x100to" Released: April 17, 2023; 4. "Le Va Doler" Released: May 25, 2023; 5. "Ojitos Rojos" Released: July 20, 2023; 6. "El Amor de Su Vida" Released: August 3, 2023; 7. "De Lunes a Lunes" Released: August 24, 2023; 8. "En Altavoz" Released: September 14, 2023

El Comienzo (English: The Beginning) is the debut studio album by American regional Mexican band Grupo Frontera. It was released on August 3, 2023 through VHR Music.

In 2024, the album won the Latin Grammy Award for Best Norteño Album, while its single, "El Amor de Su Vida" won the Latin Grammy Award for Best Regional Mexican Song.

== Background and release ==
Grupo Frontera was formed in 2019 and they created their YouTube channel in 2022, where they released their debut single "La Plata" in April. That same month, they released their second single "No Se Va"; a cover of Morat's original song, which eventually became a hit for the band, and their first hit single. After their rise in popularity, they kept releasing other singles, usually with other artists.

At the end of July 2023, the Grupo Frontera announced that their debut album, along with the cover would be released on August 3, 2023. On August 1, the track listing was revealed, with a total of 12 songs.

On October 19, 2023, Grupo Frontera was announced to be the next artist featured in the Apple Music Up Next series. This was accompanied by the release of the Apple Music Edition of the album, which features the additional single "Amor Propio". The song would be released on other platforms as a standalone single.

== Composition ==
An album of 12 songs, it has collaborations with Bad Bunny, Junior H, Yahritza y Su Esencia, Manuel Turizo, Grupo Firme, Carín León, and Ke Personajes. Although there are 12 songs in the album, the sixth track it had no song and it wasn't until three weeks after the album's release that the song was revealed.

=== Songs ===
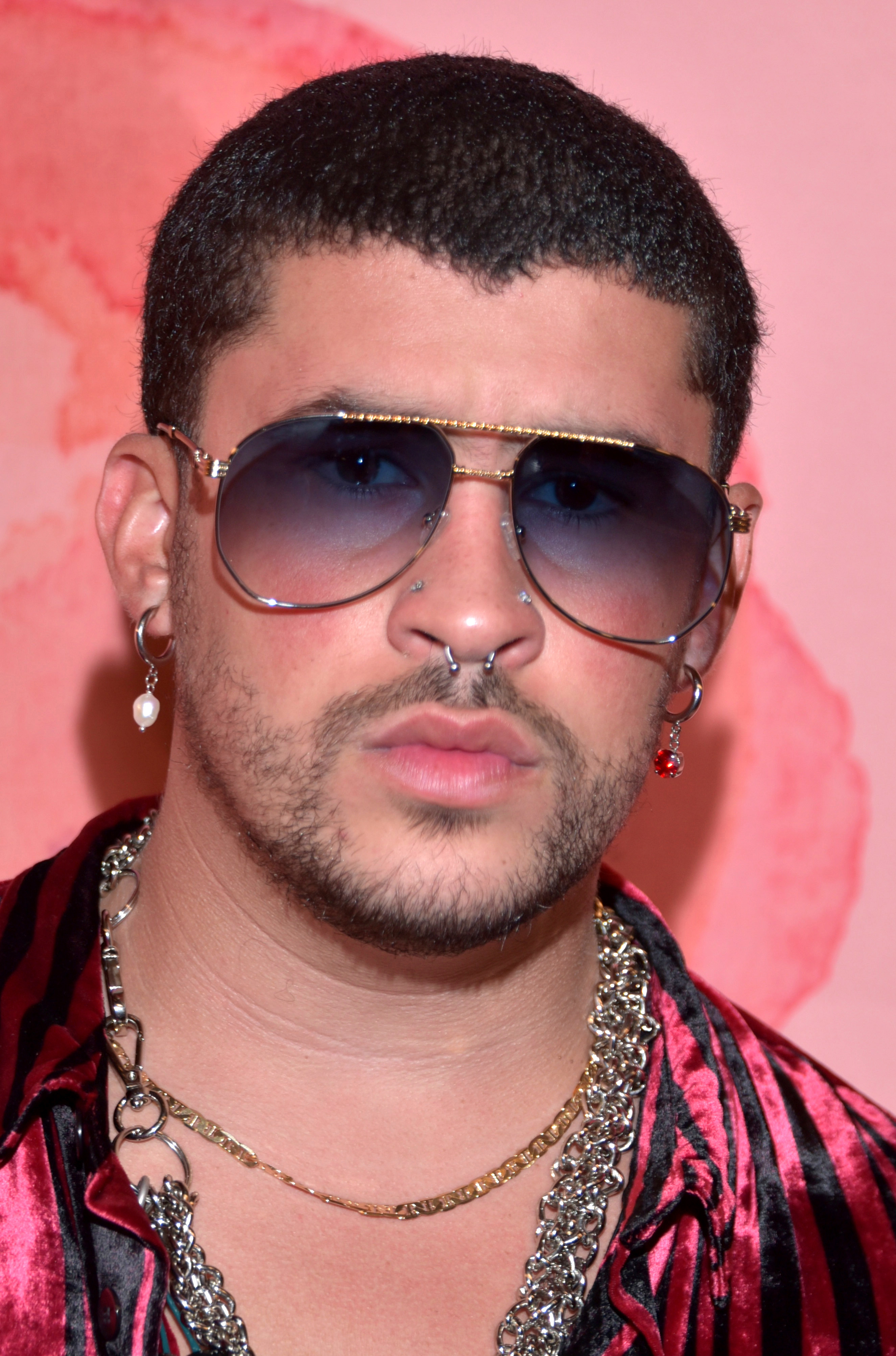
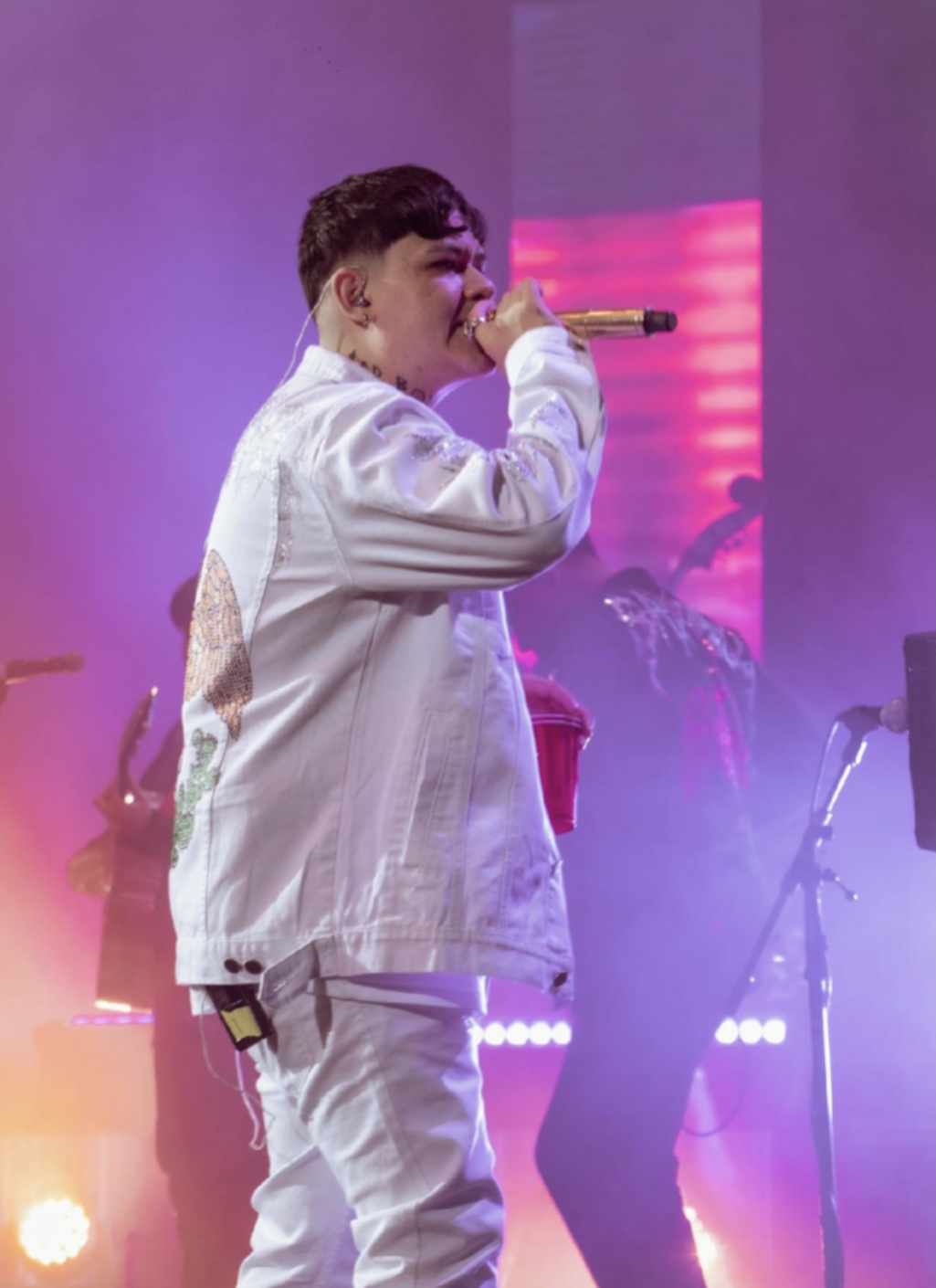
Bad Bunny (left) provides vocals on "Un x100to" and Junior H (right) provides vocals on "En Altavoz", respectively.

El Comienzo begins with its first track "No Se Va", the first major success that Grupo Frontera had achieved during 2022. The song itself is a norteño cumbia. The norteño cumbia sound continues on the second track "Un x100to" with Puerto Rican singer Bad Bunny, which was a major hit single in 2023. The third track "En Altavoz", a collaboration with urban sierreño artist Junior H, is a ranchera with accordion, bajo quinto, tololoche, and alto horns; this last instrument giving the song a Sinaloa-style sound instead of Grupo Frontera's Nuevo León style. On the fourth track "Cansado de Sufrir", Grupo Frontera returns to the sound of norteño cumbia. The fifth track "Las Flores" with the band Yahritza y su Esencia, is a grupero bolero, in which the band had stated that it is their favorite song on the album. The sixth track "De Lunes a Lunes" with the Colombian singer Manuel Turizo, is also a norteño cumbia and is about heartbreak.

On the seventh track "Me Gustas", Grupo Frontera once again performs a ranchera with accordion, bajo quinto, tololoche, and alto horns. The eighth track "El Amor de Su Vida" features the band Grupo Firme, where they also return to the norteño cumbia genre. Grupo Frontera performs a country-style ballad with the ninth track on the album "Cuídala". They then return to a norteño cumbia on the tenth track "Que Vuelvas" with Carín León. Said song was released at the end of 2022 and achieved major success in 2023. The eleventh track "Le Va Doler" is another norteño cumbia and the twelfth and final track "Ojitos Rojos" featuring the Argentine ensemble Ke Personajes, is a villera cumbia.

== Track listing ==
El Comienzo track listing
No.	Title	Writer(s)	Producer(s)	Length
1.	"No Se Va"	Andrés Torres; Mauricio Rengifo; Juan Pablo Isaza; Juan Pablo Villamil; Martín Vargas; Simón Vargas		3:14
2.	"Un x100to" (with Bad Bunny)	Benito Antonio Martínez Ocasio; Edgar Barrera; Marcos Borrero; Andrés Jael Correa Ríos	Barrera; MAG	3:15
3.	"En Altavoz" (with Junior H)	Barrera; Horacio Palencia; Nathan Galante; René Humberto Lau	Barrera	2:47
4.	"Cansado de Sufrir"	Barrera; Ríos	Barrera	2:30
5.	"Las Flores" (with Yahritza y Su Esencia)	Barrera; Yahritza Martínez	Barrera	2:47
6.	"De Lunes a Lunes" (with Manuel Turizo)	Manuel Turizo; Barrera; Maikel Rafael Rico Torres; Mario Alberto Daza Altamar; Juan Diego Melina Vélez; Julián Turizo	Barrera	3:08
7.	"Me Gustas"	Lau; Jesús Caballero	Barrera	2:34
8.	"El Amor de Su Vida" (with Grupo Firme)	Barrera; Kevyn Mauricio Cruz	Barrera	2:46
9.	"Cuídala"	Barrera; Andrea Elena Mangiamarchi; Manuel Lorente	Barrera	2:44
10.	"Que Vuelvas" (with Carín León)	Barrera	Barrera	2:49
11.	"Le Va Doler"	Barrera; Cruz; Cristian Camilo Ortíz	Barrera	2:34
12.	"Ojitos Rojos" (with Ke Personajes)	Barrera; Horacio Palencia; Diego Bollella Urtusastegui	Barrera	3:42
Total length:				34:46

Apple Music Edition bonus tracks
No.	Title	Writer(s)	Producer(s)	Length
13.	"Amor Propio"	Barrera; Cruz	Barrera	3:14
14.	"Up Next: Grupo Frontera"			5:57
Total length:				43:57

== Charts ==
=== Weekly charts ===
Weekly chart performance for El Comienzo
Chart (2023)	Peak position
Spanish Albums (Promusicae)	76
US Billboard 200	34
US Independent Albums (Billboard)	7
US Regional Mexican Albums (Billboard)	2
US Top Latin Albums (Billboard)	4

=== Year-end charts ===
2024 year-end chart performance for El Comienzo
Chart (2024)	Position
US Billboard 200	102

== Certifications ==
Certifications for El Comienzo
Region	Certification	Certified units/sales
Mexico (AMPROFON)	4× Platinum	560,000^{‡}
^{‡} Sales+streaming figures based on certification alone.
