= Grupo Frontera =

Regional Mexican band

- Grupo Frontera at the 2026 Latin Grammys

Background information
- Also known as: Frontera
- Origin: Edinburg, Texas, U.S.
- Genres: Regional Mexican; Tejano; Northeastern Norteño; cumbia; country en Español
- Years active: 2022–present
- Label: VHR Music
- Members: Adelaido "Payo" Solís III; Juan Javier Cantú; Julian Peña Jr.; Alberto "Beto" Acosta; Carlos Guerrero
- Past members: Carlos Zamora; Brian Ortega
- Website: grupo-frontera.com

Grupo Frontera is an American regional Mexican band from Edinburg, Texas. The band currently consists of lead vocalist Adelaido "Payo" Solís III, accordionist and backing vocalist Juan Javier Cantú, congas player Julian Peña Jr., bajo quinto player Alberto "Beto" Acosta, and drummer Carlos Guerrero.

== Career ==
Grupo Frontera was formed in early 2022, originally performing at weddings and parties. This led them to release their debut EP in March of that year titled, En Vivo, Vol. 1. Their release includes covers of songs such as Vicente Fernández's "Estos Celos" and Diego Verdaguer's "La Ladrona". A month later, they released their second EP, containing a cover of Morat's "No Se Va" which eventually went viral on TikTok and would chart at the end of the year. In December 2022, a second collaboration with Fuerza Regida, after "911 (En Vivo)", titled "Bebé Dame" reached number one on the Billboard Hot Latin Songs charts and peaked at number 25 on Billboard Hot 100, becoming their first top 40 hit.

Carlos Zamora, Grupo Frontera's original bassist, left the band in late 2022 and was replaced by Brian Ortega.

By May 2023, the band achieved its first top five hit on the Billboard Hot 100 with the Bad Bunny collaboration "Un x100to". In response to this, Grupo Frontera announced a 23-date tour to begin in mid-2023. An article by Billboard considered the band's success integral in the breakthrough of the regional Mexican genre. The band achieved fame through their norteño cumbias, but upon the release of their full-length debut album in August 2023, El Comienzo, they proved they could delve into other regional Mexican styles, as well as outside the genre.

The band released their second album, Jugando a Que No Pasa Nada, on May 10, 2024. The album features songs incorporating country, R&B, electronic, and bachata genres. Guest appearances on the album include Christian Nodal, Maluma, Morat, and Nicki Nicole.

Brian Ortega, Grupo Frontera's bassist, was fired in July 2025.

The band released their third studio album, Lo Que Me Falta Por Llorar, on October 23, 2025.

=== Controversy ===
In 2025, after a video of one of the members' relatives dancing to Village People's "Y.M.C.A" went viral, the band received strong backlash and boycott calls from Mexican fans, who considered it an endorsement of American president Donald Trump. The group responded twice to the controversy in February through Instagram denying any endorsement of Trump and expressing their support of Mexican people.

== Discography ==
=== Studio albums ===
List of studio albums, with selected chart positions
Title	Details	Peak chart positions				Certifications
Title	Details	US	US Latin	US Reg. Mex.	SPA	Certifications
El Comienzo	Released: August 3, 2023; Format: Digital download, streaming; Label: VHR Music	34	4	2	76	AMPROFON: 3× Platinum+Gold
Jugando a Que No Pasa Nada	Released: May 10, 2024; Format: Digital download, streaming; Label: Self-released	198	10	6	—	AMPROFON: Gold
Lo Que Me Falta Por Llorar	Released: October 23, 2025; Format: Digital download, streaming; Label: Self-released	—	23	11	—	

=== Extended plays ===
List of extended plays, with selected chart positions
Title	Details	Peak chart positions	
Title	Details	US Latin	US Reg. Mex.
En Vivo, Vol. 1	Released: March 18, 2022; Format: Digital download, streaming; Label: Self-released	—	—
No Se Va (En Vivo)	Released: April 28, 2022; Format: Digital download, streaming; Label: Self-released	—	—
Mala Mía (with Fuerza Regida)	Released: December 19, 2024; Format: Digital download, streaming; Label: Rancho Humilde, Street Mob, Sony Music Latin	9	6
Y Lo Que Viene	Released: June 12, 2025; Format: Digital download, streaming; Label: Self-released	—	—
Con Dolor	Released: May 28, 2026; Format: Digital download, streaming; Label: BorderTown Records	—	—

=== Singles ===
List of singles, with year released, selected chart positions, and album name shown
Title	Year	Peak chart positions										Certifications	Album
Title	Year	US	US Latin	US Reg. Mex.	ARG	BOL	CAN	ECU	MEX	SPA	WW	Certifications	Album
"La Plata (En Vivo)"	2022	—	—	—	—	—	—	—	—	—	—		Non-album single
"No Se Va"	2022	57	3	2	—	2	—	—	1	—	31	AMPROFON: 2× Diamond+Gold	No Se Va (En Vivo) and El Comienzo
"No Te Arrepentiras"	2022	—	—	—	—	—	—	—	—	—	—		Non-album singles
"Necesito Decirte" (with Profugos de Nuevo Leon)	2022	—	—	—	—	—	—	—	—	—	—		Non-album singles
"Si Yo Fuera Ladrón" (featuring Profugos de Nuevo León)	2022	—	—	—	—	—	—	—	—	—	—		No Se Va (En Vivo)
"Me Gustas (En Vivo)" (with Israel Morales)	2022	—	—	—	—	—	—	—	—	—	—		Con Amigos Desde Monterrey, Vol. 1 (En Vivo)
"Ya Me Enteré (En Vivo)" (with De Parranda)	2022	—	—	—	—	—	—	—	—	—	—		Non-album singles
"Super Poderes" (featuring Secretto)	2022	—	—	—	—	—	—	—	—	—	—		Non-album singles
"Ex de Verdad"	2022	—	—	—	—	—	—	—	—	—	—		Non-album singles
"Agachadita" (featuring De Parranda)	2022	—	—	—	—	—	—	—	—	—	—		Non-album singles
"Vete"	2022	—	—	—	—	—	—	—	—	—	—	AMPROFON: Platinum	No Se Va (En Vivo)
"911 (En Vivo)" (with Fuerza Regida)	2022	—	24	—	—	—	—	—	—	—	—	AMPROFON: 3× Platinum	Non-album single
"Que Vuelvas" (with Carín León)	2022	50	3	1	—	6	—	—	2	—	34	RIAA: 28× Platinum (Latin); AMPROFON: 2× Diamond	El Comienzo
"Bebe Dame" (with Fuerza Regida)	2022	25	1	1	—	3	—	25	1	—	17	AMPROFON: Diamond+2× Platinum	Sigan Hablando
"Di Que Sí" (with Grupo Marca Registrada)	2023	89	15	1	—	—	—	—	11	—	152		Don't Stop the Magic
"Dame un Chance (La Cumbia Bélica)" (with Luis R. Conriquez)	2023	—	— (Note: "Dame Un Chance (La Cumbia Bélica)" did not enter the Hot Latin Songs chart, but peaked at number 22 on the Latin Airplay chart.)	8	—	—	—	—	—	—	—		Non-album single
"Frágil" (with Yahritza y su Esencia)	2023	69	9	1	28	2	—	10	7	—	37	RIAA: Platinum; AMPROFON: 4× Platinum+Gold	Obsessed Pt. 2
"Un x100to" (with Bad Bunny)	2023	5	2	3	6	1	70	1	2	10	1	AMPROFON: Diamond+3× Platinum+Gold; PROMUSICAE: Platinum	El Comienzo
"Quédate Conmigo" (with Eslabón Armado)	2023	— (Note: "Quédate Conmigo" did not enter the Billboard Hot 100, but peaked at number 13 on the Bubbling Under Hot 100 chart.)	25	—	—	—	—	—	—	—	—		Desvelado
"Le Va Doler"	2023	—	43	—	—	25	—	—	—	—	—	AMPROFON: Platinum+Gold	El Comienzo
"Tulum" (with Peso Pluma)	2023	43	6	4	64	3	—	—	5	—	25	AMPROFON: Diamond+2× Platinum+Gold	Génesis
"Ojitos Rojos" (with Ke Personajes)	2023	—	— (Note: "Ojitos Rojos" did not enter the Hot Latin Songs chart, but peaked at number 10 on the Latin Digital Song Sales chart.)	—	4	1	—	—	—	—	— (Note: "Ojitos Rojos" did not enter the Billboard Global 200 chart, but peaked at number 128 on the Billboard Global Excl. US chart.)	AMPROFON: Platinum	El Comienzo
"El Amor de Su Vida" (with Grupo Firme)	2023	67	8	1	—	6	—	—	3	—	38	AMPROFON: 2× Diamond+Platinum	El Comienzo
"De Lunes a Lunes" (with Manuel Turizo)	2023	—	28	2	—	10	—	—	—	—	—	RIAA: Gold (Latin); AMPROFON: Platinum	El Comienzo
"En Altavoz" (with Junior H)	2023	—	37	1	—	—	—	—	—	—	—	AMPROFON: 2× Platinum	El Comienzo
"Amor Propio" (Note: "Amor Propio" only appears on the Apple Music Edition of El Comienzo.)	2023	—	—	—	—	—	—	—	—	—	—	AMPROFON: Platinum	El Comienzo
"ALV" (with Arcángel)	2023	—	39	—	—	1	—	—	—	—	—		Sentimiento, Elegancia y Más Maldad
"Alch Si" (with Carín León)	2023	—	34	1	—	—	—	—	—	—	—		Non-album single
"Quédate Bebé"	2024	—	36	39	—	—	—	—	—	—	—	AMPROFON: Gold	JUGANDO A QUE NO PASA NADA
"Ya Pedo Quién Sabe" (with Christian Nodal)	2024	—	29	4	—	—	—	—	—	—	—	AMPROFON: Platinum	JUGANDO A QUE NO PASA NADA
"(Entre Paréntesis)" (with Shakira)	2024	— (Note: "(Entre Paréntesis)" did not enter the Billboard Hot 100, but peaked at number 20 on the Bubbling Under Hot 100 chart.)	22	1	—	—	—	—	—	—	—	RIAA: 4× Platinum (Latin); AMPROFON: Platinum	Las Mujeres Ya No Lloran
"Por Qué Será" (with Maluma)	2024	—	14	1	—	4	—	—	7	—	—	AMPROFON: Platinum	Jugando a Que No Pasa Nada
"Desquite" (with Nicki Nicole)	2024	—	—	—	—	—	—	—	—	—	—		Jugando a Que No Pasa Nada
"Ángel" (with Romeo Santos)	2024	—	23	—	—	—	—	—	—	—	—	AMPROFON: Gold	Non-album single
"Ay Mamá" (with Tito Double P)	2024	—	21	—	—	—	—	—	6	—	153		Incómodo
"Pienso En Ella" (with Gabito Ballesteros)	2024	—	43	9	—	—	—	—	—	—	—		Non-album singles
"Hecha Pa' Mí"	2024	— (Note: "Hecha Pa' Mi" did not enter the Billboard Hot 100, but peaked at number 16 on the Bubbling Under Hot 100 chart.)	11	1	—	13	—	—	—	—	—		Non-album singles
"¿Qué Te Parece?" (with Óscar Maydon)	2024	—	— (Note: "¿Qué Te Parece?" did not enter the Hot Latin Songs chart, but peaked at number 13 on the Latin Digital Song Sales chart.)	—	—	—	—	—	—	—	—		Non-album singles
"Mi Corazón" (with Tiago PZK)	2024	—	—	—	—	—	—	—	—	—	—		Non-album singles
"Hoy No Me Siento Bien" (with Alejandro Sanz)	2025	—	— (Note: "Hoy no me siento bien" did not enter the Hot Latin Songs chart, but peaked at number 28 on the Latin Airplay chart.)	—	66	—	—	—	—	73	—		¿Y Ahora Qué?
"Ya No"	2025	—	—	—	—	—	—	—	—	—	—		Non-album single
"La Buena Eras Tú" (with Netón Vega)	2025	—	—	—	—	—	—	—	—	—	—		Y Lo Que Viene
"Me Retiro" (with Santana)	2025	—	—	—	—	—	—	—	—	—	—		Non-album single
"La del Proceso" (with Manuel Turizo)	2025	—	—	—	—	—	—	—	—	—	—		Y Lo Que Viene
"Mutuo" (with Carín León)	2025	—	—	—	—	—	—	—	—	—	—		Y Lo Que Viene
"¿Qué Haces Por Acá?" (with Mister Chivo)	2025	—	—	1	—	—	—	—	—	—	—		Y Lo Que Viene
"No Se Parece a Ti"	2025	—	—	—	—	—	—	—	—	—	—		Y Lo Que Viene
"Lalala"	2025	—	—	—	—	—	—	—	—	—	—		Lo Que Me Falta Por Llorar
"Apodo" (with Ryan Castro)	2025	—	—	—	—	—	—	—	—	—	—		Non-album single
"No Capea" (with Xavi)	2025	—	—	—	—	—	—	—	—	—	—		DOSIS
"Modo Difícil" (with Grupo Firme)	2025	—	—	—	—	—	—	—	—	—	—		Non-album single
"no lo ves" (with Ozuna)	2025	—	—	—	—	—	—	—	—	—	—		LO QUE ME FALTA POR LLORAR
"Beses Así" (with Calle 24)	2025	—	—	—	—	—	—	—	—	—	—		ETERNO
"Como de Sol a Sol" (with Rawayana and Carín León)	2025	—	—	—	—	—	—	—	—	—	—		¿Dónde Es El After?
"Imposible" (with Silvestre Dangond)	2026	—	—	—	—	—	—	—	—	—	—		Non-album single
"Ojitos Bellos"	2026	—	—	—	—	—	—	—	—	—	—		Con Dolor
"Salma Hayek" (with Luis R. Conriquez)	2026	—	—	—	—	—	—	—	—	—	—		Muchacho Alegre
"Cada Vez Me Gusta Más" (with Alejandro Fernández)	2026	—	—	—	—	—	—	—	—	—	—		Con Dolor
"Piquito" (with Los Dos de Tamaulipas)	2026	—	—	—	—	—	—	—	—	—	—		TBD
"—" denotes a recording that did not chart.

=== Other charted and certified songs ===
List of other charted songs, with selected chart positions and album name
Title	Year	Peak					Certifications	Album
Title	Year	US	US Latin	BOL	MEX	WW	Certifications	Album
"Los Dos" (with Morat)	2024	—	—	6	—	—	AMPROFON: Gold	Jugando a Que No Pasa Nada
"Me Jalo" (with Fuerza Regida)	2024	48	2	6	7	38		Mala Mía
"0 Sentimientos" (with Fuerza Regida)	2024	—	46	—	—	—		Mala Mía
"SOS" (with Fuerza Regida)	2024	—	42	—	—	—		Mala Mía
"Coqueta" (with Fuerza Regida)	2024	— (Note: "Coqueta" did not enter the Billboard Hot 100, but peaked at number 23 on the Bubbling Under Hot 100 chart.)	27	2	18	115		Mala Mía
"Aurora" (with Fuerza Regida and Óscar Maydon featuring Armenta)	2024	—	38	—	—	—		Mala Mía

== Awards and nominations ==
List of awards and nominations received by Grupo Frontera
Award	Year	Recipient(s) and nominee(s)	Category	Result	Ref.
American Music Awards	2026	Themselves	Best Latin Duo or Group	Nominated	
American Music Awards	2026	"Me Jalo" (with Fuerza Regida)	Best Latin Song	Nominated	
Billboard Latin Music Awards	2023	Themselves	Artist of the Year	Nominated	
Billboard Latin Music Awards	2023	Themselves	New Artist of the Year	Nominated	
Billboard Latin Music Awards	2023	Themselves	Duo/Group Hot Latin Songs Artist of the Year	Won	
Billboard Latin Music Awards	2023	Themselves	Regional Mexican Artist of the Year, Duo or Group	Nominated	
Billboard Latin Music Awards	2023	"Bebe Dame" (with Fuerza Regida)	Hot Latin Song of the Year	Nominated	
Billboard Latin Music Awards	2023	"Bebe Dame" (with Fuerza Regida)	Hot Latin Song of the Year, Vocal Event	Nominated	
Billboard Latin Music Awards	2023	"Bebe Dame" (with Fuerza Regida)	Sales Song of the Year	Nominated	
Billboard Latin Music Awards	2023	"Bebe Dame" (with Fuerza Regida)	Streaming Song of the Year	Nominated	
Billboard Latin Music Awards	2023	"Bebe Dame" (with Fuerza Regida)	Regional Mexican Song of the Year	Nominated	
Billboard Latin Music Awards	2023	"Que Vuelvas" (with Carín León)	Regional Mexican Song of the Year	Nominated	
Billboard Latin Music Awards	2023	"Un x100to" (with Bad Bunny)	Regional Mexican Song of the Year	Nominated	
Billboard Latin Music Awards	2023	"Un x100to" (with Bad Bunny)	Hot Latin Song of the Year	Nominated	
Billboard Latin Music Awards	2023	"Un x100to" (with Bad Bunny)	Hot Latin Song of the Year, Vocal Event	Nominated	
Billboard Latin Music Awards	2023	"Un x100to" (with Bad Bunny)	Streaming Song of the Year	Nominated	
Billboard Latin Music Awards	2024	Themselves	Duo/Group Hot Latin Songs Artist of the Year	Nominated	
Billboard Latin Music Awards	2024	Themselves	Top Latin Albums Artist of the Year, Duo/Group	Nominated	
Billboard Latin Music Awards	2024	Themselves	Regional Mexican Artist of the Year, Duo or Group	Nominated	
Billboard Latin Music Awards	2024	Themselves	Regional Mexican Airplay Label of the Year	Nominated	
Billboard Latin Music Awards	2024	Themselves	Regional Mexican Albums Label of the Year	Nominated	
Billboard Latin Music Awards	2024	El Comienzo	Top Latin Album of the Year	Nominated	
Billboard Latin Music Awards	2024	El Comienzo	Regional Mexican Album of the Year	Nominated	
Billboard Latin Music Awards	2025	Themselves	Duo/Group Hot Latin Songs Artist of the Year	Nominated	
Billboard Latin Music Awards	2025	Themselves	Top Latin Albums Artist of the Year, Duo/Group	Nominated	
Billboard Latin Music Awards	2025	Themselves	Tropical Songs Airplay Label of the Year	Nominated	
Billboard Latin Music Awards	2025	Themselves	Regional Mexican Artist of the Year, Duo or Group	Nominated	
Billboard Latin Music Awards	2025	"Me Jalo" (with Fuerza Regida)	Hot Latin Song of the Year, Vocal Event	Nominated	
Billboard Latin Music Awards	2025	"Me Jalo" (with Fuerza Regida)	Airplay Song of the Year	Nominated	
Billboard Latin Music Awards	2025	"Me Jalo" (with Fuerza Regida)	Regional Mexican Song of the Year	Nominated	
Billboard Latin Music Awards	2025	"Ángel" (with Romeo Santos)	Tropical Song of the Year	Nominated	
Billboard Latin Music Awards	2026	Themselves	Hot Latin Songs Artist of the Year, Duo or Group	Nominated	
Billboard Latin Music Awards	2026	Themselves	Top Latin Albums Artist of the Year, Duo or Group	Nominated	
Billboard Latin Music Awards	2026	Themselves	Regional Mexican Artist of the Year, Duo or Group	Nominated	
Billboard Latin Music Awards	2026	"No Capea" (with Xavi)	Regional Mexican Song of the Year	Nominated	
Billboard Music Awards	2023	Themselves	Top Duo/Group	Nominated	
Billboard Music Awards	2023	Themselves	Top Latin Duo/Group	Nominated	
Billboard Music Awards	2023	"Bebe Dame" (with Fuerza Regida)	Top Latin Song	Nominated	
Billboard Music Awards	2023	"Un x100to" (with Bad Bunny)	Top Latin Song	Nominated	
Billboard Music Awards	2024	Themselves	Top Latin Duo/Group	Nominated	
Billboard Music Awards	2024	El Comienzo	Top Latin Album	Nominated	
Heat Latin Music Awards	2023	Themselves	Best Popular Regional Artist	Nominated	
Heat Latin Music Awards	2024	Themselves	Best Group or Band	Nominated	
Heat Latin Music Awards	2024	Themselves	Best Popular Regional Artist	Nominated	
Heat Latin Music Awards	2024	"El Amor de Su Vida" (with Grupo Firme)	Song of the Year	Nominated	
Heat Latin Music Awards	2024	"ALV" (with Arcangel)	Best Collaboration	Nominated	
Heat Latin Music Awards	2024	El Comienzo	Album of the Year	Nominated	
Heat Latin Music Awards	2024	"Tulum" (with Peso Pluma)	Best Song for Video Games, Series or Movies	Nominated	
Heat Latin Music Awards	2025	Themselves	Best Group or Band	Nominated	
Heat Latin Music Awards	2026	Themselves	Best Group or Band	Pending	
Heat Latin Music Awards	2026	Themselves	Best Regional Mexican Artist	Pending	
Heat Latin Music Awards	2026	"Me Jalo" (with Fuerza Regida)	Best Collaboration	Pending	
Heat Latin Music Awards	2026	"No Capea" (with Xavi)	Song of the Year	Pending	
Heat Latin Music Awards	2026	Lo Que Me Falta Por Llorar	Album of the Year	Pending	
Heat Latin Music Awards	2026	"Coqueta" (with Fuerza Regida)	Best Viral Song	Pending	
iHeartRadio Music Awards	2024	Themselves	Regional Mexican Artist of the Year	Nominated	
iHeartRadio Music Awards	2024	"Bebe Dame" (with Fuerza Regida)	Regional Mexican Song of the Year	Nominated	
iHeartRadio Music Awards	2024	"Que Vuelvas" (with Carín León)	Regional Mexican Song of the Year	Nominated	
iHeartRadio Music Awards	2025	Themselves	Regional Mexican Artist of the Year	Nominated	
iHeartRadio Music Awards	2025	"Alch Si" (with Carín León)	Regional Mexican Song of the Year	Won	
iHeartRadio Music Awards	2026	Themselves	Regional Mexican Artist of the Year	Won	
iHeartRadio Music Awards	2026	"Hecha Pa' Mi"	Regional Mexican Song of the Year	Nominated	
iHeartRadio Music Awards	2026	"Ángel" (with Romeo Santos)	Latin Pop/Urban Song of the Year	Nominated	
Latin American Music Awards	2023	Themselves	New Artist of the Year	Nominated	
Latin American Music Awards	2023	Themselves	Best Duo or Group – Regional Mexican	Nominated	
Latin American Music Awards	2023	Themselves	Streaming Artist of the Year	Nominated	
Latin American Music Awards	2023	"Bebe Dame" (with Fuerza Regida)	Song of the Year	Nominated	
Latin American Music Awards	2023	"Bebe Dame" (with Fuerza Regida)	Collaboration of the Year	Nominated	
Latin American Music Awards	2023	"Que Vuelvas" (with Carín León)	Collaboration of the Year	Nominated	
Latin American Music Awards	2023	"Que Vuelvas" (with Carín León)	Best Collaboration – Regional Mexican	Nominated	
Latin American Music Awards	2023	"No Se Va (En Vivo)"	Best Song – Regional Mexican	Won	
Latin American Music Awards	2024	Themselves	Streaming Artist of the Year	Nominated	
Latin American Music Awards	2024	Themselves	Global Latin Artist of the Year	Nominated	
Latin American Music Awards	2024	Themselves	Favorite Regional Mexican Duo or Group	Won	
Latin American Music Awards	2024	"Un x100to" (with Bad Bunny)	Song of the Year	Nominated	
Latin American Music Awards	2024	"Un x100to" (with Bad Bunny)	Collaboration of the Year	Nominated	
Latin American Music Awards	2024	"Un x100to" (with Bad Bunny)	Global Latin Song of the Year	Nominated	
Latin American Music Awards	2024	El Comienzo	Album of the Year	Nominated	
Latin American Music Awards	2024	El Comienzo	Favorite Regional Mexican Album	Nominated	
Latin American Music Awards	2024	"Di Que Sí" (with Grupo Marca Registrada)	Favorite Regional Mexican Song	Nominated	
Latin American Music Awards	2024	"Bebe Dame" (with Fuerza Regida)	Best Collaboration - Regional Mexican	Nominated	
Latin American Music Awards	2024	"El Amor de Su Vida" (with Grupo Firme)	Best Collaboration - Regional Mexican	Nominated	
Latin Grammy Awards	2023	"Un x100to" (with Bad Bunny)	Song of the Year	Nominated	
Latin Grammy Awards	2023	"Un x100to" (with Bad Bunny)	Best Regional Mexican Song	Won	
Latin Grammy Awards	2024	"(Entre Paréntesis)" (with Shakira)	Song of the Year	Nominated	
Latin Grammy Awards	2024	El Comienzo	Best Norteño Album	Won	
Latin Grammy Awards	2024	Jugando a Que No Pasa Nada	Best Contemporary Mexican Music Album	Nominated	
Latin Grammy Awards	2024	"El Amor de Su Vida" (with Grupo Firme)	Best Regional Mexican Song	Won	
Latin Grammy Awards	2025	"Hecha Pa' Mí"	Best Regional Mexican Song	Nominated	
Latin Grammy Awards	2025	"Me Jalo" (with Fuerza Regida)	Best Regional Mexican Song	Nominated	
Latin Grammy Awards	2026	"Ojitos Bellos"	Best Regional Mexican Song	Nominated	
Latin Grammy Awards	2026	"No Capea" (with Xavi)	Best Regional Mexican Song	Won	
Latin Grammy Awards	2026	Lo Que Me Falta Por Llorar	Best Norteño Album	Won	
MTV MIAW Awards	2023	"Un x100to" (with Bad Bunny)	Global Hit of the Year	Nominated	
MTV MIAW Awards	2023	"Un x100to" (with Bad Bunny)	Music Ship of the Year	Nominated	
MTV Video Music Awards	2023	"Un x100to" (with Bad Bunny)	Best Latin	Nominated	
MTV Video Music Awards	2025	Themselves	Best Group	Nominated	
Premios Juventud	2023	Themselves	Favorite Group or Duo of the Year	Nominated	
Premios Juventud	2023	Themselves	My Favorite Streaming Artist	Nominated	
Premios Juventud	2023	Themselves	New Generation – Regional Mexican	Nominated	
Premios Juventud	2023	"No Se Va (En Vivo)"	Best Regional Mexican Song	Nominated	
Premios Juventud	2023	"Bebe Dame" (with Fuerza Regida)	Best Regional Mexican Collaboration	Nominated	
Premios Juventud	2023	"Que Vuelvas" (with Carin León)	Best Regional Mexican Collaboration	Nominated	
Premios Juventud	2023	"Que Vuelvas" (with Carin León)	Best Song for My Ex	Nominated	
Premios Juventud	2023	"Un x100to" (with Bad Bunny)	Best Song for My Ex	Nominated	
Premios Juventud	2023	"Un x100to" (with Bad Bunny)	Best Regional Mexican Fusion	Won	
Premios Juventud	2024	"ALV" (with Arcangel)	The Perfect Mix	Nominated	
Premios Juventud	2024	"De Lunes a Lunes" (with Manuel Turizo)	The Perfect Mix	Nominated	
Premios Juventud	2024	"De Lunes a Lunes" (with Manuel Turizo)	Best Regional Mexican Fusion	Nominated	
Premios Juventud	2024	"Alch Si" (with Carin León)	Best Regional Mexican Collaboration	Nominated	
Premios Juventud	2024	El Comienzo	Best Regional Mexican Album	Nominated	
Premios Juventud	2025	Themselves	Favorite Group or Duo of The Year	Nominated	
Premios Juventud	2025	"Por Qué Será" (with Maluma)	The Perfect Collab	Nominated	
Premios Juventud	2025	"Hoy No Me Siento Bien" (with Alejandro Sanz)	Tropical Mix	Nominated	
Premios Juventud	2025	Jugando A Que No Pasa Nada	Best Mexican Music Album	Nominated	
Premios Juventud	2026	"La Del Proceso" (with Manuel Turizo)	The Perfect Collab	Nominated	
Premios Juventud	2026	"Modo Difícil" (with Grupo Firme)	Best Mexican Music Collaboration	Won	
Premios Juventud	2026	"No Capea" (with Xavi)	Best Mexican Music Fusion	Won	
Premios Juventud	2026	Lo Que Me Falta Por Llorar	Best Mexican Music Album	Nominated	
Premio Lo Nuestro	2024	Themselves	Artist of the Year	Nominated	
Premio Lo Nuestro	2024	Themselves	Regional Mexican Group or Duo of the Year	Won	
Premio Lo Nuestro	2024	Themselves	Regional Mexican New Artist of the Year	Won	
Premio Lo Nuestro	2024	El Comienzo	Album of the Year	Nominated	
Premio Lo Nuestro	2024	El Comienzo	Regional Mexican Album of the Year	Nominated	
Premio Lo Nuestro	2024	"Un x100to" (with Bad Bunny)	Song of the Year	Nominated	
Premio Lo Nuestro	2024	"Un x100to" (with Bad Bunny)	The Perfect Mix of the Year	Nominated	
Premio Lo Nuestro	2024	"No Se Va (En Vivo)"	Regional Mexican Song of the Year	Nominated	
Premio Lo Nuestro	2024	"Bebe Dame" (with Fuerza Regida)	Regional Mexican Collaboration of the Year	Nominated	
Premio Lo Nuestro	2024	"Frágil" (with Yahritza y Su Esencia)	Regional Mexican Fusion Song of the Year	Nominated	
Premio Lo Nuestro	2025	Themselves	Artist of the Year	Nominated	
Premio Lo Nuestro	2025	Themselves	Mexican Music - Group or Duo Of The Year	Won	
Premio Lo Nuestro	2025	Jugando a Que No Pasa Nada	Album of the Year	Nominated	
Premio Lo Nuestro	2025	Jugando a Que No Pasa Nada	Mexican Music - Album of The Year	Nominated	
Premio Lo Nuestro	2025	"(Entre Paréntesis)" (with Shakira)	The Perfect Mix of the Year	Nominated	
Premio Lo Nuestro	2025	"(Entre Paréntesis)" (with Shakira)	Mexican Music - Collaboration of the Year	Won	
Premio Lo Nuestro	2025	"De Lunes a Lunes" (with Manuel Turizo)	Mexican Music - Song of the Year	Nominated	
Premio Lo Nuestro	2025	"Ya Pedo Quién Sabe" (with Christian Nodal)	Mexican Music - Fusion of the Year	Nominated	
Premio Lo Nuestro	2026	Themselves	Mexican Music - Group or Duo Of The Year	Nominated	
Premio Lo Nuestro	2026	"Me Jalo" (with Fuerza Regida)	Song of the Year	Nominated	
Premio Lo Nuestro	2026	"Me Jalo" (with Fuerza Regida)	Mexican Music – Collaboration of the Year	Nominated	
Premio Lo Nuestro	2026	“Hecha Pa’ Mi”	Mexican Music - Song of the Year	Nominated	
Premio Lo Nuestro	2026	"No Capea" (with Xavi)	Mexican Music – Fusion of the Year	Won	
Premios Tu Música Urbano	2023	Themselves	Top Artist – Regional Mexican Urban	Nominated	
Premios Tu Música Urbano	2025	"Por Qué Será" (with Maluma)	Top Song – Regional Mexican	Nominated	

== Tours ==
- El Comienzo Tour México 2023
