= El Amor de Su Vida =

Single by Grupo Frontera and Grupo Firme

from the album El Comienzo
- Language: Spanish
- English title: "The Love of Her Life"
- Released: August 3, 2023
- Genre: Cumbia; norteño
- Length: 2:52
- Songwriter: Edgar Barrera
- Producer: Edgar Barrera

Grupo Frontera singles chronology
"Ojitos Rojos" (2023)	"El Amor de Su Vida" (2023)	"De Lunes a Lunes" (2023)

Grupo Firme singles chronology
"Entre Botellas" (2023)	"El Amor de Su Vida" (2023)	"El Patrocinador" (2023)

Music video
- "El Amor de Su Vida" on YouTube

"El Amor de Su Vida" (transl. "The Love of Her Life") is a song by regional Mexican bands Grupo Frontera and Grupo Firme. It was released on August 3, 2023, as the sixth single from Grupo Frontera's debut studio album El Comienzo (2023).

Its music video was released on August 3, 2023. It peaked at number 67 on the Billboard Hot 100, and would top the US Regional Mexican Airplay chart.

In 2024, the song won the Latin Grammy Award for Best Regional Mexican Song.

== Charts ==
=== Weekly charts ===
Chart performance for "El Amor de Su Vida"
Chart (2023)	Peak position
Bolivia (Billboard)	6
Global 200 (Billboard)	38
Mexico (Billboard)	3
US Billboard Hot 100	67
US Hot Latin Songs (Billboard)	8
US Latin Airplay (Billboard)	2
US Regional Mexican Airplay (Billboard)	1

=== Year-end charts ===
Year-end chart performance for "El Amor de Su Vida"
Chart (2024)	Position
Global 200 (Billboard)	132
US Hot Latin Songs (Billboard)	21
