= Que Vuelvas (Carín León and Grupo Frontera song) =

2022 single by Carín León and Grupo Frontera

Single by Carín León and Grupo Frontera

from the album El Comienzo
- Language: Spanish
- Released: December 9, 2022
- Genre: Tejano, Northeastern Norteño cumbia
- Length: 2:49
- Label: BorderKid Records; Sony Music Latin
- Songwriter: Édgar Barrera
- Producers: Barrera; Alberto Acosta; Juan Cantú

Carín León singles chronology
"La Esquina del Mall" (2022)	"Que Vuelvas" (2022)	"Pedazo de Tonto" (2023)

Grupo Frontera singles chronology
"911 (En Vivo)" (2022)	"Que Vuelvas" (2023)	"Bebe Dame" (2023)

Music video
- "Que Vuelvas" on YouTube

"Que Vuelvas" is a song by Mexican singer-songwriter Carín León and American regional Mexican band Grupo Frontera, released on December 9, 2022, as the second single from the latter's debut studio album El Comienzo (2023). The song was written by Édgar Barrera, who produced it alongside Alberto Acosta and Juan Cantú. It is León's first song to reach the Billboard Hot 100, debuting at number 83 and peaking at number 50.

== Background ==
"Que Vuelvas" is one of the first original songs by Grupo Frontera. It was met with positive reception from fans, and gained popularity through the video-sharing platform TikTok.

== Composition ==
"Que Vuelvas" is a Tejano song, centering on yearning for a lost love and the accompanied heartbreak.

== Charts ==
=== Weekly charts ===
Chart performance for "Que Vuelvas"
Chart (2022–2023)	Peak position
Bolivia (Billboard)	6
Mexico (Billboard)	2
Global 200 (Billboard)	34
US Billboard Hot 100	50
US Hot Latin Songs (Billboard)	3
US Latin Airplay (Billboard)	4
US Regional Mexican Airplay (Billboard)	1

=== Year-end charts ===
Year-end chart performance for "Que Vuelvas"
Chart (2023)	Position
Global 200 (Billboard)	78
US Hot Latin Songs (Billboard)	11

== Certifications ==
Certifications for "Que Vuelvas"
Region	Certification	Certified units/sales
Mexico (AMPROFON)	2× Diamond	1,400,000^{‡}
United States (RIAA)	28× Platinum (Latin)	1,680,000^{‡}
^{‡} Sales+streaming figures based on certification alone.
