= Grupo Firme =

Mexican band

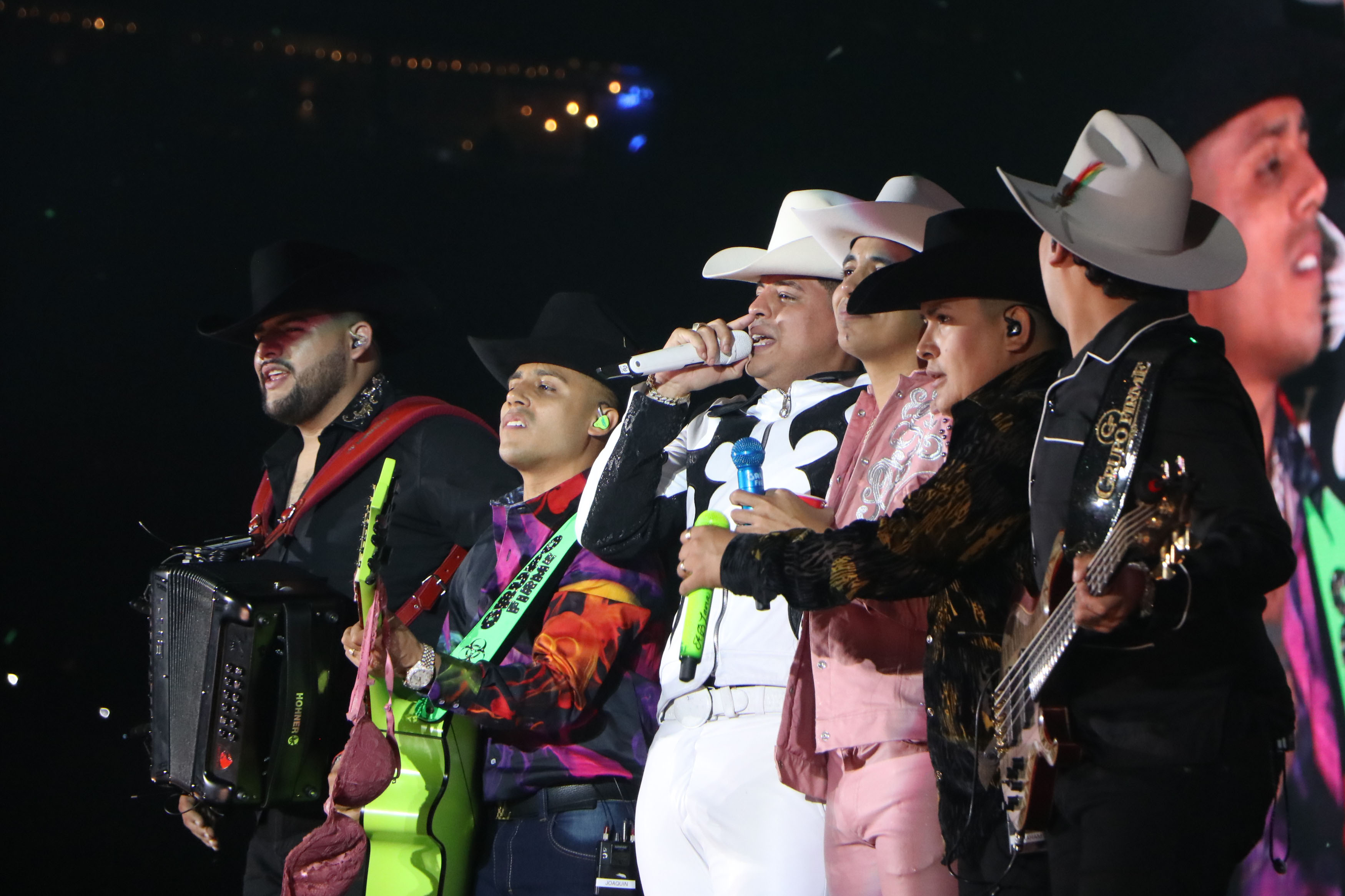

Background information
- Origin: Tijuana, Baja California, Mexico
- Genres: Pacific/Sinaloan norteño; Sinaloan banda; norteño-banda; Sinaloan sierreño; mariachi
- Years active: 2014–present
- Label: Music VIP
- Members: Eduin Cazares; Jhonny Cazares; Abraham Hernández; Dylan Camacho; Joaquín Ruiz; Christian Gutiérrez; José "Fito" Rubio

Grupo Firme is a regional Mexican band based in Tijuana, Baja California. Formed in 2014, they have received nominations for a variety of awards that include Latin Grammy, Premios Juventud and Premio Lo Nuestro, being the winner in 2021 of the latter in five categories.

== History ==
Grupo Firme was founded in 2014 in the city of Tijuana, Baja California, by Eduin Cazares (originally from Culiacán, Sinaloa) and Jairo Corrales. In 2017, they released their debut album Pasado, Presente, Futuro with a total of twelve songs. It was not very successful, but it got them noticed by the music scene. From there, they released other albums such as El Barco and En Vivo desde Tijuana: Los Buitrones y Los Firmes; the latter in collaboration with Los Buitres de Culiacán.

The group rose to fame in 2020 by releasing the singles "Pídeme", "El Roto" and "Juro Por Dios". Later that year, they toured Colombia, in addition to recording a live album there titled En Vivo desde Medellín, Colombia. The group would also go on to record a song and music video with Colombian artist Maluma, called "Cada Quién". In 2020, they were nominated for a Premios Juventud. In 2021, they won four Premios Juventudes, they also won five of six nominations at the Premios Lo Nuestro. On November 18, they won their first Latin Grammy Award for Best Banda Album for their album Nos Divertimos Lo Grando Lo Imposible. The group's success continued in 2022 as they embarked on a stadium tour throughout the United States and Mexico called Enfiestados y Amanecidos, which kicked-off at SoFi Stadium in Inglewood, California.

In June 2025, the band canceled a performance at Festival La Onda in Napa, California, saying that the Trump administration had suspended their visas.

== Collaborations ==
Grupo Firme has collaborated with Grupo Frontera to create "El Amor de Su Vida", a love song that explores the possibility of one's true love finding their own true love without them. In 2022, they sang with Banda El Recodo at the SoFi Stadium.

On 26 April 2024, the Mexican singer Thalía released a collaboration with Grupo Firme titled "Te Va a Doler". The song became a hit in US radios, reaching number one on Billboard's Latin Airplay and Latin Pop Airplay.

While performing it at their concert tour La Última Peda, Grupo Firme announced their dance-pop collaboration with American singer Demi Lovato, titled "Chula", which was released on August 15, 2024.

== Awards and nominations ==
Year	Award	Category	Nominee	Result	Ref.
2020	Premios Juventud	La Más Pomposa	Yo ya no vuelvo a tomar y El amor no fue pa' mí	Nominated	
2020	Premios Juventud	Nueva generación regional mexicano	Grupo Firme	Won	
2021	Premios Juventud	Grupo o Dúo Favorito del Año	Grupo Firme	Won	
2021	Premios Juventud	Mejor Regional Mexicana	El Güero	Won	
2021	Premios Juventud	Álbum del Año Regional Mexicano	Nos divertimos logrando lo impossible	Won	
2021	Premios Juventud	Mejor Fusión Regional Mexicana	El cambio (Mariachi)	Won	
2021	Premio Lo Nuestro	Canción Banda del Año - Regional Mexicano	Yo ya no vuelvo contigo	Won	
2021	Premio Lo Nuestro	Canción Norteña del Año - Regional Mexicano	En honor a ti	Nominated	
2021	Premio Lo Nuestro	Colaboración del Año - Regional Mexicano	Yo ya no vuelvo a ti	Won	
2021	Premio Lo Nuestro	Canción del Año - Regional Mexicano	Yo ya no vuelvo (en vivo)	Won	
2021	Premio Lo Nuestro	Album del Año - Regional Mexicano	En vivo desde Anaheim, CA	Won	
2021	Premio Lo Nuestro	Grupo o Dúo del Año - Regional Mexicano	Grupo Firme	Won	
2021	IHeartRadio Music Awards	Mejor Canción de Música Regional Mexicana	Yo ya no vuelvo a ti	Nominated	
2021	Latin Grammy Awards	Best Banda Album	Nos divertimos logrando lo impossible	Won	
2026	American Music Awards	Best Latin Duo or Group	Grupo Firme	Pending	
