= Manuel Turizo discography =

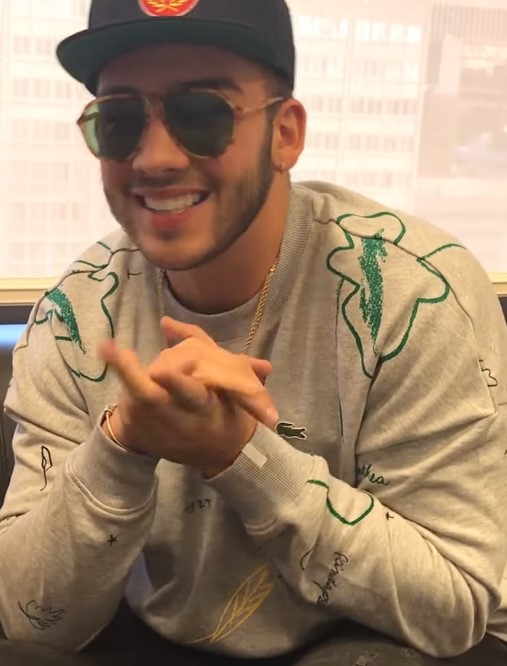
- Studio albums: 3
- Singles: 64

The discography of Colombian recording artist Manuel Turizo consists of four studio albums and sixty-four singles (including six as featured artist).

== Albums ==
=== Studio albums ===
Title	Album details	Peak chart positions			Certifications
Title	Album details	MEX	SPA	US Latin	Certifications
ADN	Released: August 23, 2019; Label: La Industria Inc., Sony Music Latin; Formats: CD, digital download, streaming	4	75	8	AMPROFON: 4× Platinum+Gold
Dopamina	Released: April 9, 2021; Label: La Industria Inc., Sony Music Latin; Formats: CD, digital download, streaming	—	8	15	AMPROFON: Platinum; RIAA: Platinum (Latin)
2000	Released: March 17, 2023; Label: La Industria Inc., Sony Music Latin; Formats: CD, digital download, streaming	—	15	11	AMPROFON: Platinum; RIAA: 2× Platinum (Latin)
201	Released: November 22, 2024; Label: La Industria Inc., Sony Music Latin; Formats: CD, digital download, streaming, vinyl	—	32	—	RIAA: Gold (Latin)
"—" denotes a recording that did not chart or was not released in that territory.

== Singles ==
=== As lead artist ===
List of singles as lead artist, with selected chart positions and certifications, showing year released and album name
Title	Year	Peak chart positions										Certifications	Album
Title	Year	COL	ARG	ITA	MEX	SPA	SWI	US	US Latin	US Latin Airplay	US Latin Pop	Certifications	Album
"Vámonos"	2016	—	—	—	—	—	—	—	—	—	—		Non-album singles
"Baila Conmigo"	2016	—	—	—	—	—	—	—	—	—	—		Non-album singles
"Una Lady Como Tú" (solo or remix featuring Nicky Jam)	2017	3	18	58	2	2	—	—	32	41	21	ASINCOL: Diamond; CAPIF: Gold; AMPROFON: 3× Diamond+Platinum; FIMI: Platinum; PROMUSICAE: 5× Platinum; RIAA: 8× Platinum (Latin)	ADN
"Déjate Llevar" (with Juan Magán and Belinda featuring Snova and B-Case)	2017	—	—	—	— (Note: "Déjate Llevar" did not enter the Billboard Mexico Airplay chart, but peaked at number 18 on the Billboard Mexican Espanol Airplay chart.)	8	—	—	—	—	—	AMPROFON: Platinum+Gold; PROMUSICAE: 2× Platinum	4.0
"Esperándote"	2017	7	—	—	17	43	—	—	39	21	13	AMPROFON: 4× Platinum; PROMUSICAE: Gold; RIAA: 2× Platinum (Latin)	ADN
"Vaina Loca" (with Ozuna)	2018	12	6	30	— (Note: "Vaina Loca" did not enter the Billboard Mexico Airplay chart, but peaked at number 22 on the Billboard Mexican Espanol Airplay chart.)	1	63	94	4	1	2	FIMI: Platinum; PROMUSICAE: 4× Platinum	Aura
"Culpables"	2018	6	40	—	—	—	—	—	—	—	—	AMPROFON: 4× Platinum; RIAA: Platinum (Latin)	ADN
"Una Vez Más" (featuring Noriel)	2018	—	—	—	—	—	—	—	—	—	—	AMPROFON: Gold	ADN
"Desconocidos" (featuring Mau y Ricky and Camilo)	2018	2	10	—	31	25	—	—	31	40	21	ASINCOL: Platinum; AMPROFON: Diamond+3× Platinum+Gold; PROMUSICAE: Platinum; RIAA: 11× Platinum (Latin)	Para Aventuras y Curiosidades
"Sola"	2018	6	—	—	25	—	—	—	17	1	2	AMPROFON: Gold; RIAA: Platinum (Latin)	ADN
"Déjalo" (with Nacho)	2018	59	67	—	—	—	—	—	48	21	7	RIAA: Platinum (Latin)	Non-album singles
"Dile la verdad" (with Jowell & Randy)	2019	2	—	—	— (Note: "Dile la verdad" did not enter the Billboard Mexico Airplay chart, but peaked at number 46 on the Billboard Mexico Pop Espanol Airplay chart.)	79	—	—	43	23	13		Non-album singles
"Esclavo de Tus Besos" (with Ozuna)	2019	6	67	—	47	14	—	—	32	31	13	AMPROFON: 3× Platinum; PROMUSICAE: Platinum; RIAA: Platinum (Latin)	ADN
"No Te Hagas la Loca" (with Noriel)	2019	12	—	—	—	—	—	—	—	—	—	RIAA: Gold (Latin)	Non-album singles
"En Cero" (with Yandel and Sebastián Yatra)	2019	—	—	—	—	70	—	—	—	27	17	RIAA: Platinum (Latin)	Non-album singles
"Cúrame" (with Prince Royce)	2019	59	40	—	—	70	—	—	31	—	—	AMPROFON: Platinum; PROMUSICAE: Gold; RIAA: 4× Platinum (Latin)	Alter Ego
"Aleluya" (with Reik)	2019	81	41	—	13	66	—	—	48	40	18	AMPROFON: 3× Platinum; RIAA: Platinum (Latin)	Ahora
"Nada Ha Cambiado"	2019	61	—	—	—	—	—	—	—	—	—	AMPROFON: Platinum	ADN
"Te Quemaste" (with Anuel AA)	2019	5	44	—	— (Note: "Te Quemaste" did not enter the Billboard Mexico Airplay chart, but peaked at number 18 on the Billboard Mexico Pop Espanol Airplay chart.)	4	—	—	31	16	15	AMPROFON: Platinum; PROMUSICAE: Gold	ADN
"Pegao" (with CNCO)	2019	92	66	—	— (Note: "Pegao" did not enter the Billboard Mexico Airplay chart, but peaked at number 34 on the Billboard Mexico Pop Espanol Airplay chart.)	—	—	—	—	23	12	RIAA: Platinum (Latin)	Que Quiénes Somos
"No Encuentro Palabras" (with Abraham Mateo)	2020												Sigo a Lo Mío
"BORRAXXA" (with Feid)	2020	—	—	—	—	—	—	—	—	—	—		Ferxxo (Vol 1: M.O.R)
"TBT" (with Sebastián Yatra and Rauw Alejandro)	2020	—	29	—	—	39	—	—	16	1	1	PROMUSICAE: Platinum; RIAA: 3× Platinum (Latin)	Dharma
"Loco" (Remix) (with Beéle & Natti Natasha featuring Farruko)	2020	—	—	—	—	—	—	—	—	—	—		Non-album single
"Quiéreme Mientras Se Pueda"	2020	3	56	—	1	93	—	—	38	20	6	AMPROFON: Diamond+Gold; CAPIF: Gold; PROMUSICAE: 2× Platinum; RIAA: 9× Platinum (Latin)	Dopamina
"Será" (with Llane)	2020												Fino
"La Nota" (with Rauw Alejandro and Myke Towers)	2020	1	25	—	1	1	—	— (Note: "La Nota" did not enter the Billboard Hot 100, but peaked at number seven on the Bubbling Under Hot 100 chart.)	5	1	—	AMPROFON: 4× Platinum; CAPIF: Platinum; PROMUSICAE: 4× Platinum; RIAA: 11× Platinum (Latin)	Dopamina
"Mala Costumbre" (with Wisin & Yandel)	2021	3	—	—	3	22	—	—	20	9	—	PROMUSICAE: Platinum	Dopamina
"Amor en Coma" (featuring Maluma)	2021	2	31	—	1	48	—	—	24	12	3		Dopamina
"Maldita Foto" (with Tini)	2021	—	11	—	17	87	—	—	—	—	15	CAPIF: Platinum; CUD: Platinum; IFPI PER: Platinum	Cupido
"Te Olvido"	2021	—	—	—	—	—	—	—	—	—	—	RIAA: 2× Platinum (Latin)	2000
"Una Vaina Loca" (with Fuego and Duki)	2021	—	15	—	—	5	—	—	—	—	—	PROMUSICAE: Platinum; RIAA: Platinum (Latin)	Non-album singles
"Resaca" (with Nio Garcia)	2021	—	—	—	—	—	—	—	—	39	—		Non-album singles
"Vacaciones" (with Luis Fonsi)	2022	—	51	—	—	—	—	—	—	28	6		Ley De Gravedad
"De 100 a 0"	2022	—	—	—	29	—	—	—	—	41	11		2000
"La Bachata"	2022	2	1	80	1	1	30	67	8	4	—	AMPROFON: 2×Diamond+Platinum; FIMI: 2× Platinum; IFPI SWI: Platinum; PROMUSICAE: 17× Platinum; RIAA: 22× Platinum (Latin)	2000
"Los Cachos" (with Piso 21)	2022	—	72	—	—	85	—	—	—	—	—		777
"Mal de Amor" (with MYA)	2022	—	59	—	—	—	—	—	—	—	—		Non-album single
"Éxtasis" (with Maria Becerra)	2022	—	27	—	—	68	—	—	—	—	—	RIAA: Platinum (Latin)	2000
"El Merengue" (with Marshmello)	2023	—	26	—	—	3	81	— (Note: "El Merengue" did not enter the Billboard Hot 100, but peaked at number 10 on the Bubbling Under Hot 100 chart.)	24	2	—	AMPROFON: 3× Platinum; FIMI: Gold; PROMUSICAE: 11× Platinum; RIAA: 6× Platinum (Latin)	2000
"Vagabundo" (with Sebastián Yatra and Beéle)	2023	—	—	—	—	3	—	—	—	—	—	PROMUSICAE: 8× Platinum; RIAA: Platinum (Latin)	Milagro
"Bentley (Remix)" (with Moffa & Young Martino)	2023	—	—	—	—	—	—	—	—	—	—		Non-album single
"Tú" (with IzyBeats featuring Stefflon Don)	2023	—	—	—	—	—	—	—	—	—	—		Edgehill
"Copa Vacía" (with Shakira)	2023	13	36	—	—	16	100	—	31	33	6	AMPROFON: Platinum; PROMUSICAE: 2× Platinum; RIAA: 2× Platinum (Latin)	Las Mujeres Ya No Lloran
"De Lunes a Lunes" (with Grupo Frontera)	2023	—	—	—	—	—	—	—	29	10	—	RIAA: Gold (Latin)	El Comienzo; 201
"Dem Time Deh" (with Sean Paul)	2023	—	—	—	—	—	—	—	—	—	—		Non-album singles
"Ojos. Labios. Cara."	2023	—	—	—	—	—	—	—	—	—	—		Non-album singles
"Mamasota" (with Yandel)	2024	—	—	—	—	—	—	—	—	—	—		201
"1000 Cosas" (with Lola Índigo)	2024	—	—	—	—	2	—	—	—	—	—		Nave Dragón
"Bahamas" (with Saiko)	2024	—	—	—	—	—	—	—	—	—	—		201
"Sussy" (with Moffa & Ñengo Flow)	2024	—	—	—	—	—	—	—	—	—	—		Playground
"Dios Te Cuide"	2024	—	—	—	—	—	—	—	—	—	—		201
"De Vuelta" (with Tiago PZK)	2024	—	—	—	—	64	—	—	—	—	—		Gotti A
"Enhorabuena"	2024	—	—	—	—	—	—	—	—	—	—		201
"Qué Pecao" (with Kapo)	2024	—	—	—	—	9	—	—	—	—	—		201
"Si Preguntan Por Mi" (with Chris Lebron)	2024	—	—	—	—	—	—	—	—	—	—		En Honor Al Que Ama
"Sigueme Besando Así"	2024	—	—	—	—	—	—	—	—	—	—		201
"Feliz Año Nuevo" (with Armenta)	2025	—	—	—	—	—	—	—	—	—	—		Pórtate Bien
"En Privado" (with Xavi)	2025	—	—	—	—	—	—	— (Note: "En Privado" did not enter the Billboard Hot 100, but peaked at number 4 on the Bubbling Under Hot 100 chart.)	11	—	—		Non-album singles
"Que Haces" (with Becky G)	2025	—	—	—	—	44	—	—	35	23	—		Non-album singles
"Cómo Sería" (with Alejandro Sanz)	2025	—	—	—	—	—	—	—	—	—	—		¿Y Ahora Qué?
"La Del Proceso" (with Grupo Frontera)	2025	—	—	—	—	—	—	—	—	—	—		Y Lo Que Viene
"Mírame Ahora (Salud Mi Reina)"	2025	—	—	—	—	45	—	—	—	—	—		
"Por un Pendejo no se llora [Salud mi Reina]"	2026	—	—	—	—	42	—	—	—	—	—		
"Inglés en Miami" (with Rawayana)	2026	—	—	—	—	56	—	—	—	—	—		
"—" denotes a recording that did not chart or was not released in that territory.

=== As featured artist ===
List of singles as featured artist, with selected chart positions and certifications, showing year released and album name
Title	Year	Peak chart positions							Certifications	Album
Title	Year	COL	ARG	MEX	SPA	US Latin	US Latin Airplay	US Latin Pop	Certifications	Album
"Bésame" (Valentino featuring Manuel Turizo)	2017	6	—	— (Note: "Bésame" did not enter the Billboard Mexico Airplay chart, but peaked at number 20 on the Billboard Mexican Espanol Airplay chart.)	85	—	—	—		Non-album single
"Déjala Que Vuelva" (Piso 21 featuring Manuel Turizo)	2017	7	7	3	13	16	8	6	ASINCOL: 2× Platinum; AMPROFON: Diamond+3× Platinum; PROMUSICAE: 2× Platinum; RIAA: 7× Platinum (Latin)	Ubuntu
"Pa Olvidarte (Remix)" (ChocQuibTown, Zion & Lennox and Farruko featuring Manuel Turizo)	2019	1	—	—	66	—	—	—	RIAA: 3× Platinum (Latin)	Non-album singles
"Despacio" (Natti Natasha featuring Nicky Jam, Manuel Turizo and Myke Towers)	2020	—	—	—	—	39	10	12		Non-album singles
"Pa' la Cultura" (David Guetta & HUMAN(X) featuring Sofía Reyes, Abraham Mateo, De la Ghetto, Manuel Turizo, Zion & Lennox, Lalo Ebratt, Thalía & Maejor)	2020	—	—	—	—	—	—	—		Non-album singles
"AOK" (Tai Verdes featuring Manuel Turizo)	2021	—	—	—	—	—	—	—		Non-album singles
"—" denotes a recording that did not chart or was not released in that territory.

== Other charted songs ==
List of other charted songs
Title	Year	Peaks		Album
Title	Year	ARG	US Latin	Album
"Cosas Malas" (with Justin Quiles and Dalex)	2021	71	—	Dopamina
"Una Cerveza" (with Fuerza Regida)	2023	—	22	Pa Las Baby's y Belikeada

== Guest appearances ==
List of non-single guest appearances, with other performing artists, showing year released and album name
Title	Year	Other artist(s)	Album
"Ser Un Cantante"	2018	None	La Reina del Flow, Vol. 2
"Tiene Novio"	2019	Sech	Sueños
"Resort"	2019	Farruko	Gangalee
"Impulsivo"	2019	Justin Quiles	Realidad
"Celda"	2020	Yandel	Quien Contra Mí 2
"DM"	2021	Nicky Jam	Infinity
"Na de Eso"	2021	Arcángel & Nicky Jam	Los Favoritos 2.5
"Mala Influencia"	2021	Noriel	Cerrando Capítulo
"Baila Kumi"	2022	Ir-Sais	Deeper X (Part 1) - EP
"Será"	2022	Llane	Fino
"Vale La Pena"	2023	Miky Woodz	OG City
"Una Cerveza"	2023	Fuerza Regida	Pa Las Baby's y Belikeada
"Indirectas"	2024	Wisin	Mr. W (Deluxe)
"Menos El Cora"	2025	Ryan Castro	Sendé
