= Premios 40 Principales for Best Latin Song =

Annual Spanish music award

- Awarded for: Best in Spanish and International music
- Country: Spain
- Presented by: Los 40 Principales
- First award: 2007
- Currently held by: "Dardos" by Romeo Santos & Prince Royce (2026)

The Premios 40 Principales for Best Latin Song is an honor presented annually at the Los 40 Principaless, a ceremony that recognizes excellence, creates a greater awareness of cultural diversity and contributions of Latino artists in the international scene.

Juanes is the most awarded songwriter in the category with two. Shakira and Cali & El Dandee are the only lyricists to be nominated twice in the same year: Shakira in 2011, and Cali & El Dandee one year later. After an eight-year absence, the award was revived for the 2020 edition as Los 40 expanded the Latin category.

== Recipients ==
Year	Performing artist	Work	Nominees
2007	Juanes	"Me Enamora"	Shakira– "Las de la Intuición"; Jennifer Lopez – "Qué Hiciste"; Maná – "Manda una Señal"; / Julieta Venegas featuring Dante Spinetta – "Primer día"
2008	Juanes	"Gotas de Agua Dulce"	/ Eros Ramazzotti featuring Ricky Martin – "No Estamos Solos"; Maná – "Si No Te Hubieras Ido"; Belinda – "Bella Traición"; Julieta Venegas – "El presente"
2009	Shakira	"Loba"	Nelly Furtado – "Manos al Aire"; / Tiziano Ferro featuring Amaia Montero – "El Regalo más Grande"; Luis Fonsi – "No Me Doy por Vencido"; Paulina Rubio – "Causa y Efecto"
2010	Camila	"Mientes"	/ Shakira featuring Freshlyground – "Waka Waka (Esto es África)"; Diego Torres – "Guapa"; Juanes – "Yerbatero"; Paulina Rubio – "Ni Rosas Ni Juguetes"
2011	/ Don Omar featuring Lucenzo	"Danza Kuduro"	/ Shakira featuring Dizzee Rascal – "Loca"; / Shakira featuring El Cata– "Rabiosa"; Carlos Baute – "Quien te Quiere como Yo"; Maná – "Lluvia al Corazón"
2012	Cali & El Dandee	"Yo Te Esperaré"	Crossfire – "Lady"; / Cali & El Dandee featuring David Bisbal – "No Hay 2 Sin 3 (Gol)"; Tacabro – "Tacata'"; Sie7e – "Tengo Tu Love"
Category inactive from 2013 to 2019
2020	Maluma	"Hawái"	/ Karol G & Nicki Minaj – "Tusa"; Camilo – "Favorito"; / Camilo & Rauw Alejandro – "Tattoo"; J Balvin – "Rojo"
2021	(Puerto Rico) Rauw Alejandro	"Todo de Ti"	(Puerto Rico) Bad Bunny & Jhay Cortez – "Dakiti"; (Colombia) / (Puerto Rico) Sebastián Yatra & Myke Towers – "Pareja del Año"; (Colombia) Camilo – "Vida de Rico"; (Puerto Rico) Farruko – "Pepas"
2022	(Colombia) Manuel Turizo	"La Bachata"	(Puerto Rico) Bad Bunny – "Tití Me Preguntó"; (Argentina) / (Spain) Bizarrap & Quevedo – "Quevedo: Bzrp Music Sessions, Vol. 52"; (Colombia) Karol G – "Provenza"; (Colombia) / (Puerto Rico) Shakira & Rauw Alejandro – "Te Felicito"; (Colombia) Sebastián Yatra – "Tacones Rojos"
2023	(Colombia) Manuel Turizo	"El Merengue"	(Colombia) Maluma – "Coco loco"; (United States) / (Mexico) Eslabon Armado & Peso Pluma – "Ella Baila Sola"; (Argentina) Nathy Peluso – "Tonta"; (Argentina) Tini – "Cupido"; (Colombia) Sebastián Yatra, Manuel Turizo & Beéle – "Vagabundo"
2024	(Argentina) Emilia & Tini	"La Original"	(Spain) / (Cuba) Enrique Iglesias & Yotuel – "Fría"; (Colombia) Karol G – "Si Antes Te Hubiera Conocido"; (Argentina) María Becerra – "Imán (Two of Us)"; (Colombia) Morat – "Faltas tú"; (Puerto Rico) Rauw Alejandro – "Déjame entrar"
2025	(Venezuela) Alleh & Yorghaki	"Capaz (Merenguetón)"	(Colombia) / (Puerto Rico) Morat & Jay Wheeler – "Sin ti"; (Puerto Rico) / (Spain) Mora & C. Tangana – "Droga"; (Argentina) María Becerra & Tini – "Hasta que me enamoro"; (Colombia) Shakira – "Soltera"; (Argentina) Luck Ra & BM – "La morocha"

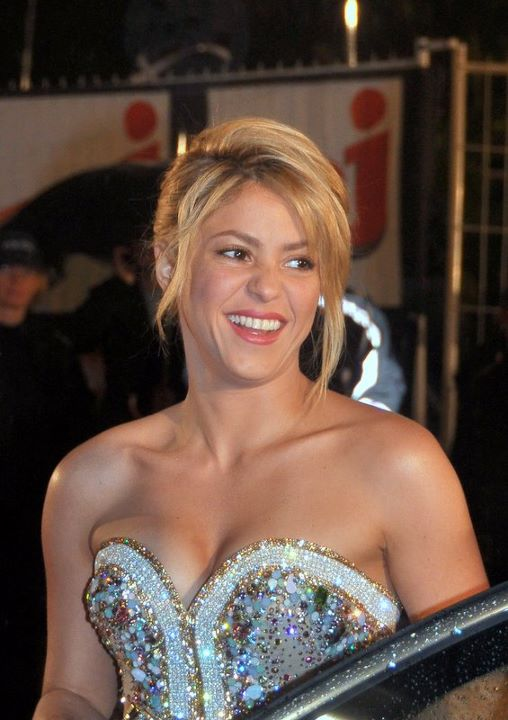
2009 winner Shakira.

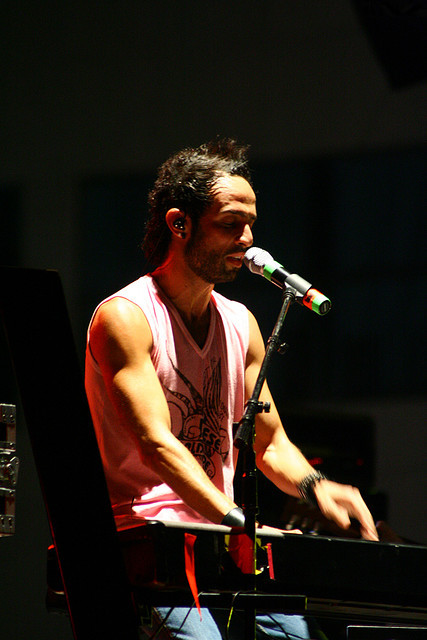
Mexican artist Mario Domm of Camila won in 2010 for Latin Song "Mientes".

== Category facts ==
Most Wins in Category

Rank	1st	2nd
Artist	Juanes	Shakira; Camila; Don Omar; Lucenzo; Cali & El Dandee; Maluma
Total Wins	2 wins	1 wins

Most Nominations

Rank	1st	2nd	3rd
Artist	Shakira	Juanes; Maná	Cali & El Dandee; Julieta Venegas; Paulina Rubio; Camilo
Total Nominations	5 Nominations	3 Nominations	2 nominations
