= La Voz Kids (Spanish TV series) season 10 =

La Voz Kids
- Season 10
- Promotional poster featuring coaches (clockwise from top left) Edurne, Turizo, Índigo, and Bisbal
- Hosted by: Eva González; Juanra Bonet (backstage host)
- Coaches: David Bisbal; Edurne; Lola Índigo; Manuel Turizo
- Winner: Lucas Paulano
- Winning coach: Manuel Turizo
- Runner-up: Manuel Pato

Release
- Original network: Antena 3
- Original release: 3 May – 19 July 2025

Season chronology
- ← Previous; Season 9 Next → Season 11

The tenth season of La Voz Kids premiered on 3 May 2025 on Antena 3. This season, David Bisbal and Lola Índigo reprised their roles as coaches from the previous season. Edurne and Manuel Turizo joined as new coaches this season, replacing Rosario Flores and Melendi, respectively.

Eva González and Juanra Bonet remained as the hosts of the program.

On 19 July, Lucas Paulano was announced as the winner of this season, marking Manuel Turizo's first time win as a coach. With Paulano's win, he became the youngest artist on La Voz Kids to win the show, at age eight. He also became the first artist to have two coaches superblocked in the blind auditions (David superblocked Edurne and Turizo superblocked David). Additionally, Turizo became the fifth coach to win on his debut season, following Manuel Carrasco, Antonio Orozco, Melendi, and Pablo López. At age 25, Turizo also became the youngest coach on the Spanish version of the show to win a season.

== Coaches and Hosts ==
La Voz Kids Season 10 Coaches and Hosts

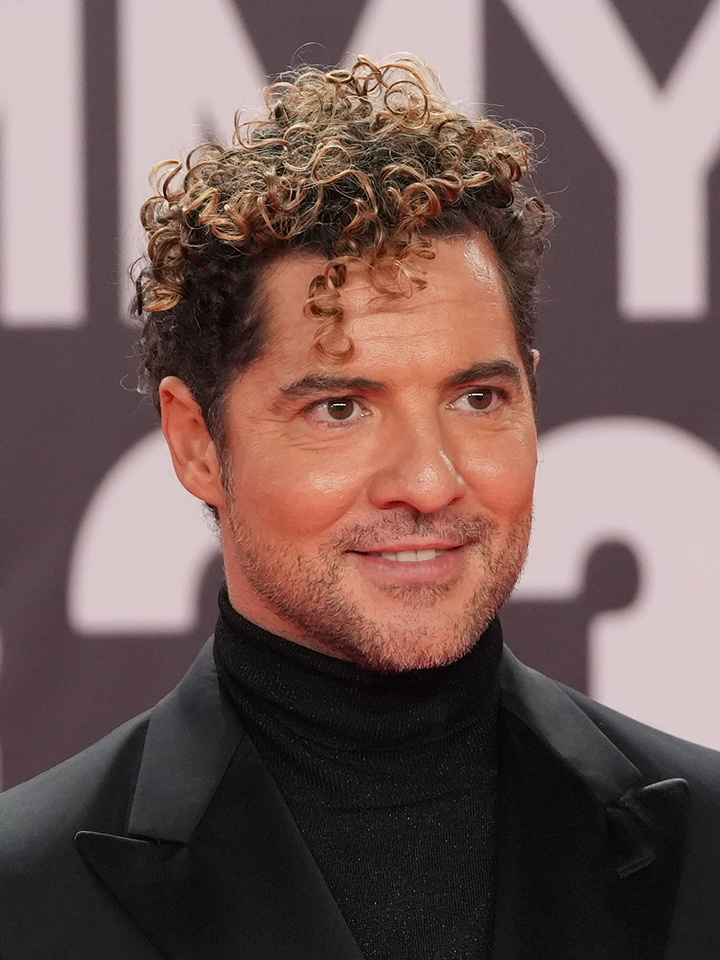
David Bisbal

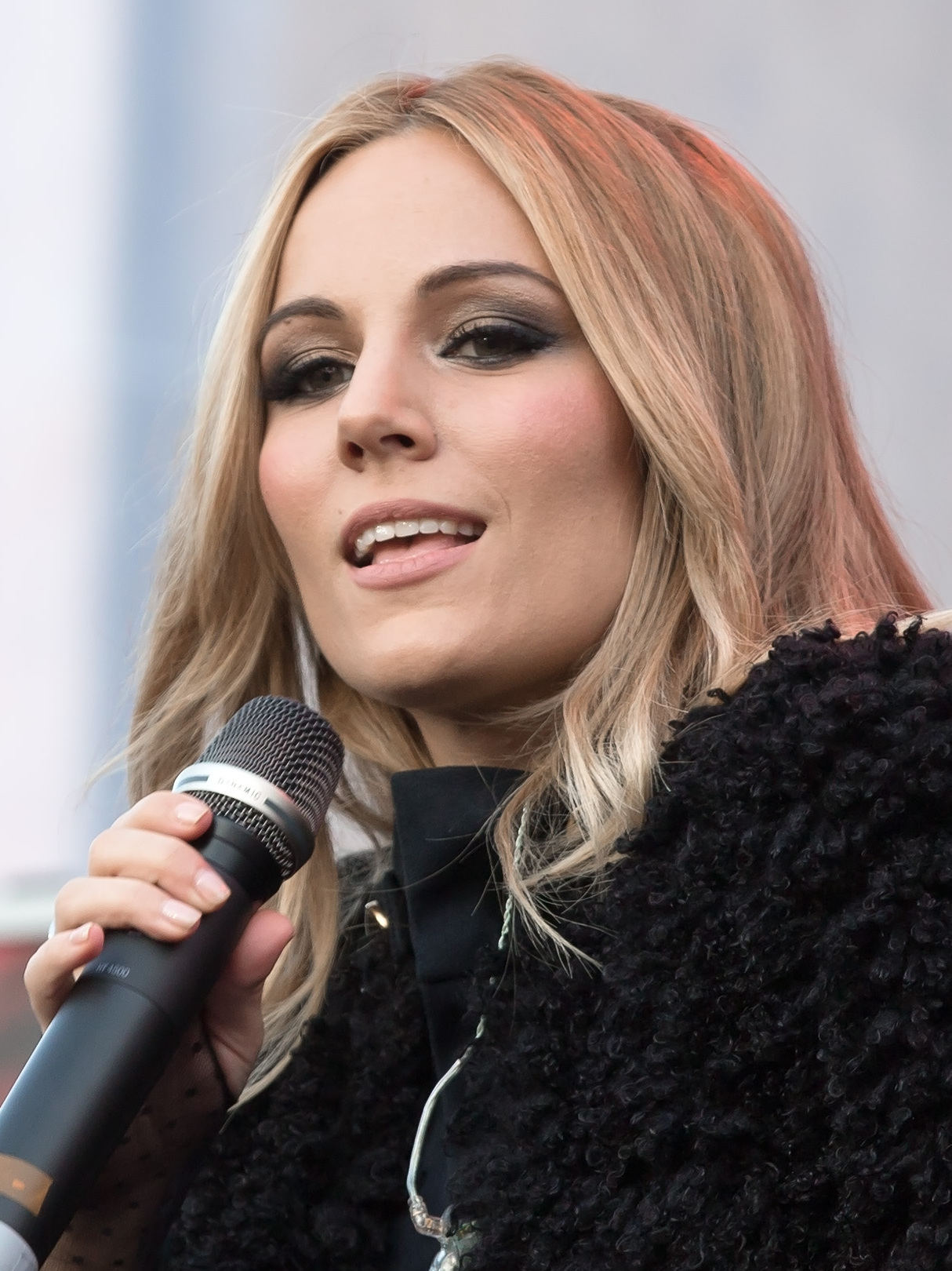
Edurne

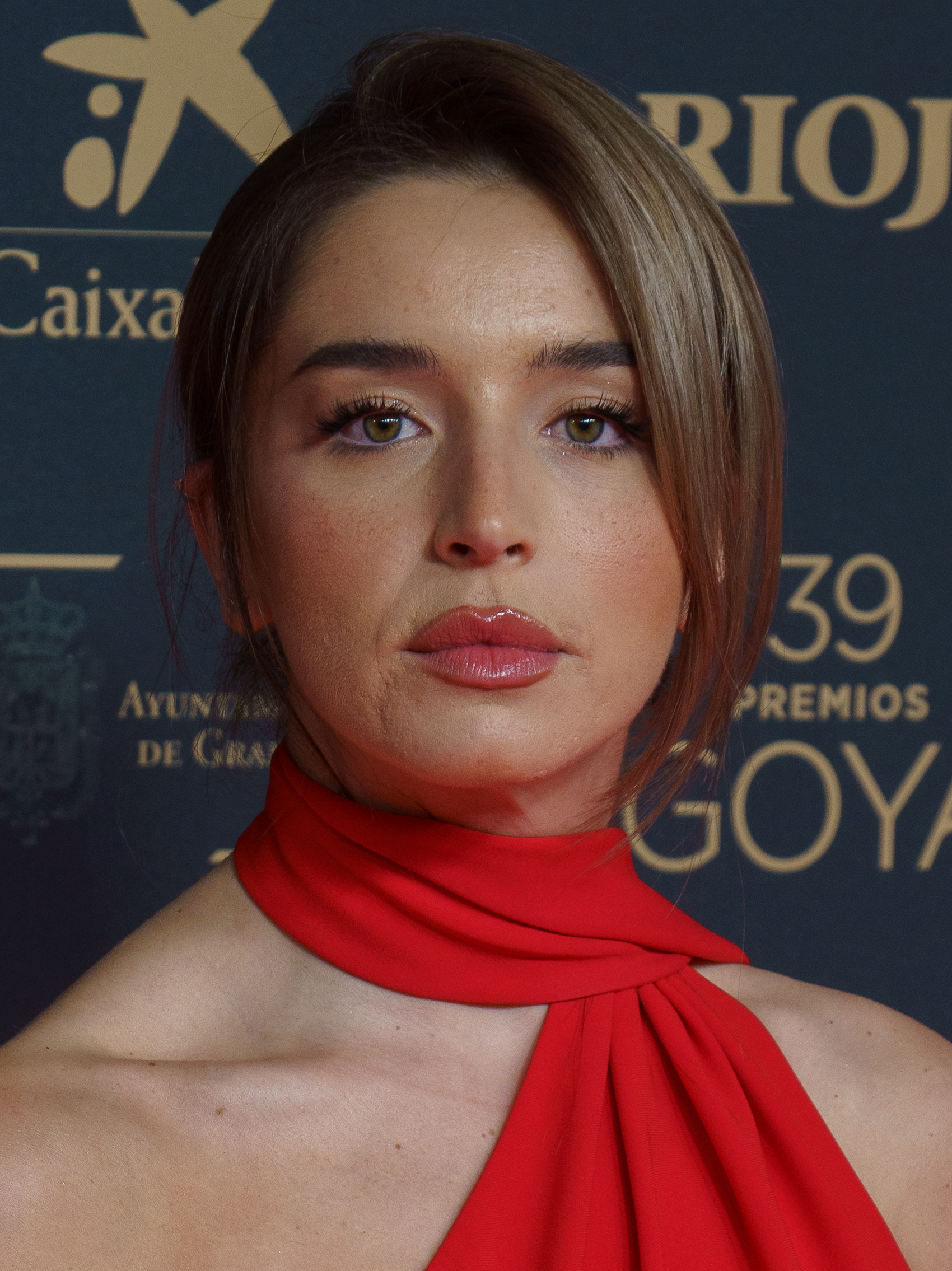
Lola Índigo

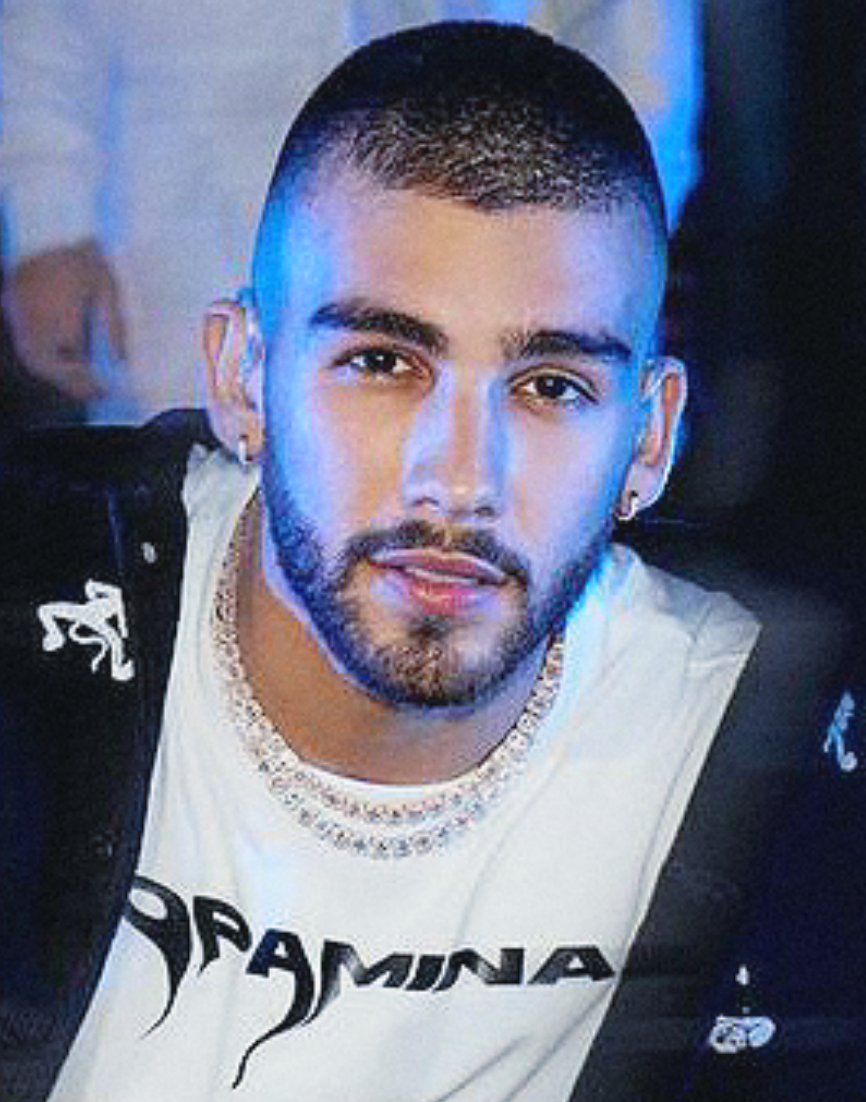
Manuel Turizo

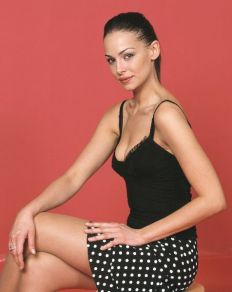
Eva González

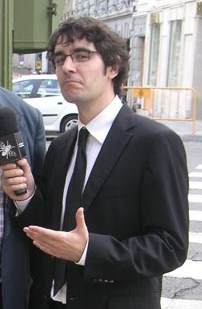
Juanra Bonet

In this season, two out of the four coaches from the previous season remained as coaches. David Bisbal and Lola Índigo both returned to the panel for their ninth and second seasons as coaches, respectively. Both Edurne and Manuel Turizo debuted as coaches this season, replacing Rosario Flores and Melendi. Both hosts from the previous season, Eva González and Juanra Bonet, returned this season.

== Teams ==
- Winner
- Runner-up
- Third Place
- Fourth Place
- Eliminated in the Finale
- Eliminated in the Semi-final
- Eliminated in the Phase 2 of the Knockouts
- Stolen in Phase 1 of the Knockouts
- Eliminated in Phase 1 of the Knockouts
- Eliminated in the Battles

Coaches	Top 56 Artists				
David Bisbal					
David Bisbal	Miguel Ramírez	Emilio Barrul	Daniela Niebla	Marta Gómez	Prishylla Vlad
David Bisbal	~~Iker Durán~~	Celia Ortega	Luis Valladares	Pere Company	Daniela Delgado
David Bisbal	Cayetana García	Manuel González	Alejandro Martínez	Gonzalo Posada	Clara Zambudio
Edurne					
Edurne	Manuel Pato	Isabel Buendía	Santiago Saavedra	Clara Matilde	María Eugenia Tovar
Edurne	~~Daniela Niebla~~	Daniela González	Guillermo Peréz	Aylin Burdan	Thais Ceacero
Edurne	Antonio del Pozo	Claudia Díaz	Ángela Jiménez	Emma Mora	Nerea Tamayo
Lola Índigo					
Lola Índigo	Lucía Pascual	David Calvo	Iker Durán	David Sarnago	Carolina Valiente
Lola Índigo	~~Javier Jesús Gómez~~	Matías Mosna	Adriana Vigo	Javier Contreras	Engel Cuesta
Lola Índigo	Miguel Fernández	Ana Gómez	Mariam González	Almudena Meneses	Leo Rose
Manuel Turizo					
Manuel Turizo	Lucas Paulano	Geraldine Aranda	Javier Jesús Gómez	Llara Aranda	Frida Cifuentes
Manuel Turizo	~~Santiago Saavedra~~	Aran Ciurana	Salma Rodríguez	Laura Carmona	Ana Elena Márquez
Manuel Turizo	Samuel Ortiz	Yuliangela Rendon	Carla Santilario	Sofía Savov	Isabella Tapia
Note: Italicized names are stolen contestants (names struck through within former teams).

== Blind Auditions ==
Each coach has two blocks. When a coach presses the block button during a performance, the blocked coach's chair does not turn around. The superblock returns this season and is used after the performance is complete, and the coaches are pitching for the artist. The superblocked coach's chair turns back to the audience. Each coach has 3 superblocks each. Two coaches can be blocked in one audition.

✔	Coach pressed "QUIERO TU VOZ" button
	Artist elected to join this coach's team
	Artist defaulted to this coach's team
	Artist eliminated as no coach pressing "QUIERO TU VOZ" button
✘	Coach pressed "QUIERO TU VOZ" button, but was blocked by another coach from getting the artist
✘	Coach pressed "QUIERO TU VOZ" button, but was superblocked by another coach from getting the artist
	Blocked by David; Blocked by Edurne; Blocked by Lola; Blocked by Turizo

Episode	Order	Artist	Age	Song	Coach's and artist's choices			
Episode	Order	Artist	Age	Song	David	Edurne	Lola	Turizo
Episode 1 (3 May)	1	Lucía Pascual	11	"Maybe This Time"	✘	✘	✔	✔
Episode 1 (3 May)	2	Daniela González	8	"La Llorona"	–	✔	–	–
Episode 1 (3 May)	3	Celia Ortega	15	"Ya no quiero ser"	✔	✔	✔	✔
Episode 1 (3 May)	4	Mario Moreno	11	"This Is Me"	–	–	–	–
Episode 1 (3 May)	5	Aran Ciurana	11	"Girl on Fire"	–	–	–	✔
Episode 1 (3 May)	6	Pere Company	12	"Snowman"	✔	✘	–	✔
Episode 1 (3 May)	7	Laura Carmona	14	"Lela"	–	✘	–	✔
Episode 1 (3 May)	8	Aylin Burdan	10	"Shake It Off"	–	✔	–	✘
Episode 1 (3 May)	9	Hugo, Nacho & Lucas	10	"Todos los besos"	–	–	–	–
Episode 1 (3 May)	10	Miguel Ramírez	10	"El gato"	✔	–	–	✔
Episode 1 (3 May)	11	Daniela Delgado	15	"Control"	✔	✔	–	✔
Episode 1 (3 May)	12	África Ramos	10	"Con la miel en los labios"	–	–	–	–
Episode 1 (3 May)	13	Adriana Vigo	10	"Never Enough"	–	–	✔	✔
Episode 2 (10 May)	1	Lucas Paulano	8	"Luz de Luna"	✘	✘	–	✔
Episode 2 (10 May)	2	David Sarnago	15	"María"	✔	✔	✔	✔
Episode 2 (10 May)	3	Thais Ceacero	7	"Me cuesta tanto olvidarte"	–	✔	–	–
Episode 2 (10 May)	4	Ana Gómez	15	"Con la miel en los labios"	–	✔	✔	✔
Episode 2 (10 May)	5	Úrsula Tomás	9	"Campanera"	–	–	–	–
Episode 2 (10 May)	6	Prishylla Vlad	14	"It's a Man's Man's Man's World"	✔	✔	–	✔
Episode 2 (10 May)	7	Ángela Jiménez	12	"What Was I Made For?"	✘	✔	–	✔
Episode 2 (10 May)	8	Iker Durán	13	"Shallow"	✔	–	–	✔
Episode 2 (10 May)	9	Emilio Barrul	15	"Aroma de mujer"	✔	✔	✔	✔
Episode 2 (10 May)	10	Carmen Marti	12	"Slipping Through My Fingers"	–	–	–	–
Episode 2 (10 May)	11	Isabel Buendía	15	"On My Own"	✔	✔	–	✔
Episode 2 (10 May)	12	Cristian Valladolid	13	"Payaso"	–	–	–	–
Episode 2 (10 May)	13	Isabella Tapia	12	"Cuestión de suerte"	–	–	–	✔
Episode 3 (24 May)	1	David Calvo	14	"Corazón hambriento"	✔	✔	✔	✔
Episode 3 (24 May)	2	Salma Rodríguez	14	"Can't Remember to Forget You"	–	–	–	✔
Episode 3 (24 May)	3	Aitor Ibáñez	11	"La gato bajo la lluvia"	–	–	–	–
Episode 3 (24 May)	4	Manuel Pato	14	"Por ti volaré"	✘ (Note: Lola pressed the button to block David by Turizo making her press the button against her will; nevertheless, the block still counted.)	✔	✘	✔
Episode 3 (24 May)	5	Manuel González	15	"Spirit"	✔	–	–	–
Episode 3 (24 May)	6	Matías Mosna	13	"Lose Control"	✔	✔	✔	– (Note: David blocked Turizo, but Turizo didn't turn so the block did not count.)
Episode 3 (24 May)	7	Carolina Ramil	12	"…Baby One More Time"	–	–	–	–
Episode 3 (24 May)	8	Leo Rose	10	"Under the Bridge"	–	–	✔	–
Episode 3 (24 May)	9	Geraldine Aranda	14	"Pero me acuerdo de ti"	✔	✔	–	✔
Episode 3 (24 May)	10	Carla Santilario	13	"Voilà"	–	–	–	✔
Episode 3 (24 May)	11	Alejandro Martínez	11	"Diamonds"	✔	–	✔	✔
Episode 3 (24 May)	12	42° North	11-13	"Sweet Child o' Mine"	–	–	–	–
Episode 3 (24 May)	13	Nerea Tamayo	15	"For Once in My Life"	–	✔	–	–
Episode 4 (31 May)	1	Clara Matilde	13	"Moon River"	✘	✔	–	✔
Episode 4 (31 May)	2	Daniela Niebla	14	"La Incondicional"	–	✔	–	✔
Episode 4 (31 May)	3	Carolina Ramil	12	"Material Girl"	–	–	–	–
Episode 4 (31 May)	4	Carolina Valiente	14	"Me quedo contigo"	✘	✔	✔	✔
Episode 4 (31 May)	5	Gonzalo Posada	13	"La niña de la linterna"	✔	–	–	✔
Episode 4 (31 May)	6	Samuel Ortiz	12	"Caresse sur l'océan"	–	–	–	✔
Episode 4 (31 May)	7	Llara Aranda	14	"Love in the Dark"	–	–	–	✔
Episode 4 (31 May)	8	Antonio del Pozo	14	"Cómo me gustaría contarte"	–	–	–	–
Episode 4 (31 May)	9	Javier Contreras	10	"La saeta"	–	✔	✔	–
Episode 4 (31 May)	10	Cayetana García	13	"No te pude retener"	✔	–	–	✔
Episode 4 (31 May)	11	Mariam González	12	"That Way"	–	–	✔	–
Episode 4 (31 May)	12	Francisco Cañero	10	"Entre sobras y sobras"	–	–	–	–
Episode 4 (31 May)	13	Ana Elena Márquez	15	"Aquella estrella de allá"	–	–	–	✔
Episode 5 (7 June)	1	Guillermo Peréz	11	"Still Loving You"	–	✔	–	–
Episode 5 (7 June)	2	Sofía Savov	15	"idontwannabeyouanymore"	–	–	–	✔
Episode 5 (7 June)	3	Sofía Soto	15	"Que la vida vale"	–	–	–	–
Episode 5 (7 June)	4	Luis Valladares	15	"El arte de vivir"	✔	✔	–	–
Episode 5 (7 June)	5	María Eugenia Tovar	12	"Video Games"	–	✔	–	–
Episode 5 (7 June)	6	Max Sánchez	12	"2002"	–	–	–	–
Episode 5 (7 June)	7	Clara Zambudio	15	"Vuelvo a verte"	✔	–	–	✔
Episode 5 (7 June)	8	Ana García	15	"Zombie"	–	–	–	–
Episode 5 (7 June)	9	Marta Gómez	15	"All of Me"	✔	✔	✘	✔
Episode 5 (7 June)	10	Engel Cuesta	12	"Human"	Team full	✔	✔	✔
Episode 5 (7 June)	11	Kenzo García	11	"Dos palabras"	Team full	–	–	–
Episode 5 (7 June)	12	Antonio del Pozo	14	"Sincericidio"	Team full	✔	–	–
Episode 6 (14 June)	1	Emma Mora	13	"Traitor"	Team full	✔	–	✔
Episode 6 (14 June)	2	Miguel Fernández	14	"I See Red"	Team full	✔	✔	✔
Episode 6 (14 June)	3	Yuliangela Rendon	12	"Ya te olvidé"	Team full	–	–	✔
Episode 6 (14 June)	4	Nicolae Rotila	-	"Aunque no sea conmigo"	Team full	–	–	–
Episode 6 (14 June)	5	Sofía Flores	12	"Part of Your World"	Team full	–	–	–
Episode 6 (14 June)	6	Claudia Díaz	14	"Cuando zarpa el amor"	Team full	✔	–	✔
Episode 6 (14 June)	7	Frida Cifuentes	14	"Me and Mrs. Jones"	Team full	Team full	–	✔
Episode 6 (14 June)	8	Santiago Saavedra	11	"La mejor de todas"	Team full	Team full	–	✔
Episode 6 (14 June)	9	Carla López	13	"Te olvidaré"	Team full	Team full	–	Team full
Episode 6 (14 June)	10	Almudena Meneses	12	"Ben"	Team full	Team full	✔	Team full
Episode 6 (14 June)	11	Eva Requena	13	"Believe"	Team full	Team full	–	Team full
Episode 6 (14 June)	12	Javier Jesús Gómez	12	"Nana del caballo grande"	Team full	Team full	✔	Team full

== Great Battles ==
The great battles aired on 21 June 2025. This season, the artists are placed in groups of four or five. Decisions are made following all battles from that respective team, with each coach electing seven total artists to advance to the knockouts. Like the previous season, there are no steals in this round. In addition, coaches' advisors help them on deciding who will be advancing to the next round; Danna Paola for Team David, Natalia Lacunza for Team Edurne, Rvfv for Team Lola, and Kapo for Team Turizo.

Battles color key
Artist was chosen by his/her coach to advance to the Knockouts
Artist was eliminated

=== Episode 7 (21 June) ===
Seventh episode's results
Order	Coach	Winner	Songs	Losers
1	Edurne	Guillermo Peréz	"The Edge of Glory"	Aylin Burdan
1	Edurne	Guillermo Peréz	"The Edge of Glory"	Ángela Jiménez
1	Edurne	Guillermo Peréz	"The Edge of Glory"	Nerea Tamayo
1	Edurne	Guillermo Peréz	"The Edge of Glory"	Antonio del Pozo
2	Edurne	Daniela González	"El sol no regresa"	Thais Ceacero
2	Edurne	Daniela Niebla	"El sol no regresa"	Claudia Díaz
3	Edurne	Isabel Buendía	"Memory"	Emma Mora
3	Edurne	Manuel Pato	"Memory"	Emma Mora
3	Edurne	Clara Matilde	"Memory"	Emma Mora
3	Edurne	María Eugenia Tovar	"Memory"	Emma Mora
4	Manuel Turizo	Lucas Paulano	"Dígale"	Samuel Ortiz
4	Manuel Turizo	Santiago Saavedra	"Dígale"	Yuliangela Rendon
5	Manuel Turizo	Frida Cifuentes	"Leave the Door Open"	Carla Santilario
5	Manuel Turizo	Aran Ciurana	"Leave the Door Open"	Sofia Savov
5	Manuel Turizo	Salma Rodríguez	"Leave the Door Open"	Sofia Savov
6	Manuel Turizo	Llara Aranda	"Inevitable"	Laura Carmona
6	Manuel Turizo	Geraldine Aranda	"Inevitable"	Ana Elena Márquez
6	Manuel Turizo	Geraldine Aranda	"Inevitable"	Isabella Tapia
7	David Bisbal	Celia Ortega	"Desde cuándo"	Clara Zambudio
7	David Bisbal	Emilio Barrul	"Desde cuándo"	Cayetana García
7	David Bisbal	Luis Valladares	"Desde cuándo"	Cayetana García
8	David Bisbal	Prishylla Vlad	"Homeless"	Manuel González
8	David Bisbal	Marta Gómez	"Homeless"	Alejandro Martínez
8	David Bisbal	Iker Durán	"Homeless"	Alejandro Martínez
9	David Bisbal	Miguel Ramírez	"Culpable o no"	Daniela Delgado
9	David Bisbal	Miguel Ramírez	"Culpable o no"	Pere Company
9	David Bisbal	Miguel Ramírez	"Culpable o no"	Gonzalo Posada
10	Lola Índigo	David Sarnago	"A Million Dreams"	Almudena Meneses
10	Lola Índigo	Lucía Pascual	"A Million Dreams"	Ana Gómez
10	Lola Índigo	Lucía Pascual	"A Million Dreams"	Leo Rose
11	Lola Índigo	Carolina Valiente	"Cuando zarpa el amor"	Javier Contreras
11	Lola Índigo	Javier Jesús Gómez	"Cuando zarpa el amor"	Javier Contreras
11	Lola Índigo	David Calvo	"Cuando zarpa el amor"	Javier Contreras
12	Lola Índigo	Matías Mosna	"No One"	Engel Cuesta
12	Lola Índigo	Adriana Vigo	"No One"	Miguel Fernández
12	Lola Índigo	Adriana Vigo	"No One"	Mariam González

== Knockouts ==
=== Phase 1 ===
Phase 1 of the Knockouts aired on 28 June and 5 July.

In the first phase, the seven artists on each team will perform one by one, singing their blind audition song. One artist will receive the 'Fast-Pass (Pase Directo)' and directly advance to the semi-final. Three artists will be put in the 'Danger Zone' where they will compete for one remaining spot in the second phase. In addition, each coach was given a 'Steal' to get an artist from another team to advance to the Lives. Once an artist is announced to be put into the 'Danger Zone', the coach whose 'Steal' is still available will have the chance to steal the artist. Artists who got stolen will automatically advance to the semi-final. After an artist got stolen, the coach of the team then chooses another artist for the 'Danger Zone'. This procedure comes to an end once there are three artists officially in the 'Danger Zone'. The remaining artists will be eliminated in this round and won't have the chance to compete next week. Additionally, the advisors from the battles were present in the round and helped the coaches with decisions.

The first episode of the Knockouts features Team David and Team Turizo. David Bisbal and his advisor Danna Paola performed "Vuelve, vuelve". Manuel Turizo and his advisor Kapo took the stage with "Qué Pecao".

The second episode of the Knockouts features Team Lola and Team Edurne. Lola Índigo and her advisor Rvfv performed "Casanova". Edurne and her advisor Natalia Lacunza took the stage with "Todo lamento" and "La Culpa".

Knockouts (Phase 1) color key
Artist got a 'Fast-Pass' and advanced to the semi-final
Artist was stolen by another coach and advanced to the semi-final
Artist put in the 'Danger Zone' and entered Phase 2
Artist was eliminated

Knockouts Results
Episode	Coach	Order	Artist	Song	Results
Episode 8 (28 June)	David Bisbal	1	Miguel Ramírez	"El gato"	Danger Zone
Episode 8 (28 June)	David Bisbal	2	Prishylla Vlad	"It's a Man's Man's Man's World"	Danger Zone
Episode 8 (28 June)	David Bisbal	3	Marta Gómez	"All of Me"	Danger Zone
Episode 8 (28 June)	David Bisbal	4	Luis Valladares	"El arte de vivir"	Eliminated
Episode 8 (28 June)	David Bisbal	5	Celia Ortega	"Ya no quiero ser"	Eliminated
Episode 8 (28 June)	David Bisbal	6	Iker Durán	"Shallow"	Stolen by Lola
Episode 8 (28 June)	David Bisbal	7	Emilio Barrul	"Aroma de mujer"	Fast-Pass
Episode 8 (28 June)	Manuel Turizo	8	Lucas Paulano	"Luz de Luna"	Fast-Pass
Episode 8 (28 June)	Manuel Turizo	9	Salma Rodríguez	"Can't Remember to Forget You"	Eliminated
Episode 8 (28 June)	Manuel Turizo	10	Llara Aranda	"Love in the Dark"	Danger Zone
Episode 8 (28 June)	Manuel Turizo	11	Frida Cifuentes	"Me and Mrs. Jones"	Danger Zone
Episode 8 (28 June)	Manuel Turizo	12	Aran Ciurana	"Girl on Fire"	Eliminated
Episode 8 (28 June)	Manuel Turizo	13	Santiago Saavedra	"La mejor de todas"	Stolen by Edurne
Episode 8 (28 June)	Manuel Turizo	14	Geraldine Aranda	"Pero me acuerdo de ti"	Danger Zone
Episode 9 (5 July)	Lola Índigo	1	Lucía Pascual	"Maybe This Time"	Fast-Pass
Episode 9 (5 July)	Lola Índigo	2	David Calvo	"Corazón hambriento"	Danger Zone
Episode 9 (5 July)	Lola Índigo	3	Matías Mosna	"Lose Control"	Eliminated
Episode 9 (5 July)	Lola Índigo	4	David Sarnago	"María"	Danger Zone
Episode 9 (5 July)	Lola Índigo	5	Carolina Valiente	"Me quedo contigo"	Danger Zone
Episode 9 (5 July)	Lola Índigo	6	Adriana Vigo	"Never Enough"	Eliminated
Episode 9 (5 July)	Lola Índigo	7	Javier Jesús Gómez	"Nana del caballo grande"	Stolen by Turizo
Episode 9 (5 July)	Edurne	8	Daniela Niebla	"La Incondicional"	Stolen by David
Episode 9 (5 July)	Edurne	9	Clara Matilde	"Moon River"	Danger Zone
Episode 9 (5 July)	Edurne	10	Daniela González	"La Llorona"	Eliminated
Episode 9 (5 July)	Edurne	11	Guillermo Peréz	"Still Loving You"	Eliminated
Episode 9 (5 July)	Edurne	12	María Eugenia Tovar	"Video Games"	Danger Zone
Episode 9 (5 July)	Edurne	13	Isabel Buendía	"On My Own"	Danger Zone
Episode 9 (5 July)	Edurne	14	Manuel Pato	"Por ti volaré"	Fast-Pass

=== Phase 2 ===
Phase 2 of the Knockouts aired 12 July.

In the second phase, the remaining three artists on each team that were placed in the 'Danger Zone' in the first phase perform individually for the final spot left on their coaches' team in the semi-final. At the end of the round, only one artist moves on and the other two are eliminated from the competition from the studio audience vote, contrary to previous seasons where the coaches made the decisions. The coaches' advisors once again were present.

Knockouts (Phase 2) color key
Artist was saved by studio audience and advanced to the semi-final
Artist was eliminated

Final Knockouts Results
Episode	Coach	Order	Artist	Song	Result
Episode 10 (12 July)	David Bisbal	1	Prishylla Vlad	"If I Ain't Got You"	Eliminated
Episode 10 (12 July)	David Bisbal	2	Miguel Ramírez	"Todo Cambió"	Audience's vote
Episode 10 (12 July)	David Bisbal	3	Marta Gómez	"Wrecking Ball"	Eliminated
Episode 10 (12 July)	Lola Índigo	4	Carolina Valiente	"City of Stars"	Eliminated
Episode 10 (12 July)	Lola Índigo	5	David Sarnago	"Love On Top"	Eliminated
Episode 10 (12 July)	Lola Índigo	6	David Calvo	"20 de enero"	Audience's vote
Episode 10 (12 July)	Edurne	7	Clara Matilde	"Última"	Eliminated
Episode 10 (12 July)	Edurne	8	María Eugenia Tovar	"Tattoo"	Eliminated
Episode 10 (12 July)	Edurne	9	Isabel Buendía	"Tómame o déjame"	Audience's vote
Episode 10 (12 July)	Manuel Turizo	10	Llara Aranda	"These Walls"	Eliminated
Episode 10 (12 July)	Manuel Turizo	11	Geraldine Aranda	"Amor Ordinario"	Audience's vote
Episode 10 (12 July)	Manuel Turizo	12	Frida Cifuentes	"Rolling in the Deep"	Eliminated

== Final phase ==
The final phase aired on 18 and 19 July. In the semi-final round, the top twelve artists perform for eight spots in the finale. One artist from each team moves on from the public vote and the other is selected by his/her coach. In the finale, the round is divided into two parts. In round one, the two artists remaining on each team sing solo and with their team's advisor. Then, each coach selects one of the two artists remaining on his/her team to move on the grand finale. The top four artists perform with their coaches, and, following this, the public votes for the winner of the season.

=== Night 1: Semi-final (18 July) ===
At the beginning of the episode, the top twelve artists performed "Quédate conmigo" with Pastora Soler. During the broadcast, the coaches performed "Ajedrez" and "El Tonto". DePol performed "Dime solo si lo has pensao" with Teams Edurne and David, while Chiara Oliver performed "Bucle" with Teams Lola and Turizo. At the end of the show, Beret performed "Hola, ¿Qué tal?" with the eight finalists.

Semi-final color key
Artist was chosen by the public to advance to the Finale
Artist was chosen by his/her coach to advance to the Finale
Artist was eliminated

Order	Coach	Artist	Song	Result
1	Edurne	Isabel Buendía	"Si tú no estas"	Edurne's Choice
2	Edurne	Santiago Saavedra	"Ya me enteré"	Eliminated
3	Edurne	Manuel Pato	"Es la noche del amor"	Advanced
4	David Bisbal	Miguel Ramírez	"Aléjate de mí"	Advanced
5	David Bisbal	Daniela Niebla	"Víveme"	Eliminated
6	David Bisbal	Emilio Barrul	"Cuando nadie me ve"	David's Choice
7	Lola Índigo	Lucía Pascual	"New York, New York"	Lola's Choice
8	Lola Índigo	Iker Durán	"Set Fire to the Rain"	Eliminated
9	Lola Índigo	David Calvo	"Sin miedo a nada"	Advanced
10	Manuel Turizo	Geraldine Aranda	"Tattooed Heart"	Turizo's Choice
11	Manuel Turizo	Javier Jesús Gómez	"Rosa María"	Eliminated
12	Manuel Turizo	Lucas Paulano	"Amor eterno"	Advanced

=== Night 2: Finale (19 July) ===
==== Round one ====
At the beginning of the episode, former coach Malú performed a medley of the coaches' songs with the eight finalists. During the episode, all of David Bisbal's finalists since his coaching debut performed "Dígale" as a tribute due to him departing La Voz following this season.

Finale color key
Artist was chosen by his/her coach to advance to round two
Artist was eliminated

Order	Coach	Artist	Song	Duet with team advisor	Result
1	Manuel Turizo	Geraldine Aranda	"En cambio no"	"Uwaie" (with Kapo)	Eliminated
2	Manuel Turizo	Lucas Paulano	"Algo de mi"	"Uwaie" (with Kapo)	Turizo's Choice
3	David Bisbal	Emilio Barrul	"Mi Marciana"	"Dos primaveras" (with Nil Moliner)	Eliminated
4	David Bisbal	Miguel Ramírez	"Imagíname Sin Ti"	"Dos primaveras" (with Nil Moliner)	David's Choice
5	Lola Índigo	Lucía Pascual	"Don't Rain on My Parade"	"Rueda" (with Rvfv)	Lola's Choice
6	Lola Índigo	David Calvo	"Procuro Olvidarte"	"Rueda" (with Rvfv)	Eliminated
7	Edurne	Isabel Buendía	"It's All Coming Back to Me Now"	"I Don't Know You" (with Natalia Lacunza)	Eliminated
8	Edurne	Manuel Pato	"Caruso"	"I Don't Know You" (with Natalia Lacunza)	Edurne's Choice

- Note: Danna Paola, the advisor for Team David, was not present in the episode and David's team instead performed with Nil Moliner.

==== Round two ====
At the end of the show, Lucas Paulano from Team Turizo was crowned the winner of the season. Paulano became the youngest artist to win La Voz Kids at eight years old. Additionally, Turizo became the fifth coach to win on his debut season.

Order	Coach	Artist	Duet with coach	Result
1	Edurne	Manuel Pato	"I Will Always Love You"	Runner-up
2	Lola Índigo	Lucía Pascual	"El dragón"	Fourth place
3	David Bisbal	Miguel Ramírez	"Y ya te quería"	Third place
4	Manuel Turizo	Lucas Paulano	"Quiéreme mientras se pueda"	Winner

=== Overall ===
Color key
Artist's info

- Team David
- Team Edurne
- Team Lola
- Team Turizo

Result details

- Winner
- Runner-up
- Third Place
- Fourth Place
- Saved by the public
- Saved by the coach
- Eliminated

Live Show Results per week
Artists	Semifinal, Top 12	Grand finale	
Lucas Paulano	Safe	Safe	Winner
Manuel Pato	Safe	Safe	Runner-up
Miguel Ramírez	Safe	Safe	Third place
Lucía Pascual	Safe	Safe	Fourth place
Geraldine Aranda	Safe	Eliminated	Eliminated (Round One)
Emilio Barrul	Safe	Eliminated	Eliminated (Round One)
Isabel Buendía	Safe	Eliminated	Eliminated (Round One)
David Calvo	Safe	Eliminated	Eliminated (Round One)
Iker Durán	Eliminated	Eliminated (Semifinal)	
Javier Jesús Gómez	Eliminated	Eliminated (Semifinal)	
Daniela Niebla	Eliminated	Eliminated (Semifinal)	
Santiago Saavedra	Eliminated	Eliminated (Semifinal)	
