= Rubén Tuesta =

Argentinian internet personality

- Born: Rubén Alexis Tuesta Saldaña Chaito; November 14, 1997 (age 28); Chiclayo, Peru
- Years active: 2018–
- Known for: YouTuber, TikToker, etc.
- Notable work: Music
- Website: https://www.rubentuesta.com

Rubén Alexis Tuesta Saldaña is a TikToker and youtuber who is mainly known for imitating a character from El Chavo del Ocho "Quico" (also known as "Cachetes" on his TikToks). He also works himself on his videos and TikToks as mom, dad, and grandma, the family by Cachetes.

== Biography ==
He was born in 1998 in Chiclayo, Peru.

On August 2, 2016, he opened his YouTube channel. On September 13, 2018, he published his first short to YouTube. On June 28, 2019, he published his first video.

Afterwards, he kept posting more short videos on TikTok and YouTube, and some became more popular.

In September 2022, he published a video that became quite popular in the world for imitating the song "Quevedo: Bzrp Music Sessions, Vol. 52" entitled "El Álbum de Figuritas: Cachetes (Bzrp Session)" which currently has more than 100 million views and more than 1.2 million likes. In this song he sings Cachetes.

In November 2022, Ruben Tuesta imitates "La Bachata" by Manuel Turizo, singing as the voice of Cachetes, which also went viral on social media.

In January 2023, he gained popularity again for making a video imitating the song "Shakira: Bzrp Music Sessions, Vol. 53" entitled "Mamá de Cachetes (Bzrp Session)" where in the video Cachetes's mother imitates as "Shakira" and Cachetes as "Bizarrap". It has more than 50 million views and more than 1 million likes.

On February 1, 2023, Ruben Tuesta is awarded in TikTok Awards 2023.

In mid-2023 Ruben Tuesta announced a play called "Misión Cachetes" that would come out later and later they began to prepare the tickets and works for the act.

On June 9, 2023, he publishes his song "Te Quiero Dejar" where the father of Cachetes sings.

On June 30, 2023, he publishes the song "Media Naranja" where Cachetes sings.

== Discography ==
=== 2022 ===
- Cachetes (Bzrp Session)
- Alentando

=== 2023 ===
- Mamá de Cachetes (Bzrp Session)
- Te Quiero Dejar
- Media Naranja
