= Los 40 Music Awards 2023 =

Spanish music awards ceremony

LOS40 Music Awards Santander 2023
- Date: 3 November 2023
- Location: WiZink Center, Madrid
- Presented by: Los 40
- Hosted by: Tony Aguilar; Dani Moreno; Cristina Boscá

Highlights
- Most wins: Manuel Turizo (3)
- Most nominations: Manuel Turizo (7) (Note: Though El Mundo mentions that Manuel Turizo, Aitana, and Feid, were the most nominated artists with six nominations each, Turizo appears with seven nominations in the nominations list, posted by the same newspaper. Other sources, such as Los 40, does not list Turizo as a nominee for "Copa Vacía" in the Best Latin Music Video, while El Mundo does. Similarly, despite "TQG" being nominated for Best Latin Music Video and Best Latin Urban Collaboration, Shakira is listed as a nominee only for the latter.)
- Website: los40.com/tag/los40_music_awards/a/

Television/radio coverage
- Network: Divinity; Los 40; YouTube

The 18th Los 40 Music Awards, also named Los 40 Music Awards Santander 2023 for sponsorship reasons, took place on 3 November 2023, at WiZink Center in Madrid, to recognize the best in Spanish and international music of 2023.

The nominations were announced on 17 October 2023. Colombian singer Manuel Turizo led the nominations with seven, followed by Aitana and Feid, with six each. In the Spanish categories, the award for Best New Urban Act was introduced, while in the Global Latin categories, Best Urban Collaboration and Best Urban Song were introduced. In the International categories, four awards previously awarded were not presented: Best New Act, Best Video, Best Collaboration and Best Dance Act

== Performers ==
The following is a list of artists slated to perform at the award show so far:

Artist(s)	Song(s)
Ozuna	"Caramelo" "Eva Longoria" "Hey Mor"
Emilia	"GTA" "No Se Ve"
Camilo	"El Mismo Aire" "Favorito" "Vida de Rico" "Kesi" "Índigo" (with Evaluna Montaner)
Vicco	"Nochentera"
María Becerra	"Corazón Vacío" "Piscina" "Los del Espacio"
Abraham Mateo	"Maníaca"
Lola Índigo	"Corazones Rotos" "El Tonto"
Álvaro de Luna	"Todo Contigo"
Take That	"Windows" "Patience"
Ana Mena	"Un Clásico" "Madrid City"
Rels B	"Un Rodeoooo"
Tom Odell	"Black Friday" "Another Love"
Shakira	"Acróstico" (filmed in Miami)
Manuel Turizo	"La Bachata" "El Merengue"
Álvaro Soler	"Oxígeno"
Loreen	"Euphoria" "Is It Love" "Tattoo"
Chanel	"Loka" (with Maikel Delacalle) "Clavaíto" (with Abraham Mateo)
Nil Moliner	"Vuela Alto" "Libertad"
David Bisbal	"Tengo Roto el Corazón" "Ajedrez" "Ave María"
Saiko	"Polaris" "Supernova"
Aitana	"Los Ángeles" "Las Babys" "Mi Amor"
Feid	"Classy 101" (with Young Miko) "Bubalú"

== Winners and nominees ==
The nominees were revealed on 17 October 2023. Winners are listed first and bold.

List of winners and nominees for the LOS40 Music Awards 2023
Spain
Best Act	Best New Act
Ana Mena; Álvaro de Luna; Aitana; Lola Índigo; David Bisbal; Quevedo	Vicco; Charlie USG; Hilario; Mar Lucas; Ters; Paula Koops
Best Album	Best Song
αlpha – Aitana; El Dragón – Lola Índigo; Corazón y Flecha – Manuel Carrasco; Bellodrama – Ana Mena; Donde Quiero Estar – Quevedo; Resiliencia – Beret	"Todo Contigo" – Álvaro de Luna; "Los Ángeles" – Aitana; "Nochentera" – Vicco; "El Tonto" – Lola Índigo & Quevedo; "Clavaíto" – Chanel & Abraham Mateo; "Beso" – Rosalía & Rauw Alejandro
Best Video	Best Live Act
"Las Babys" – Aitana; "Vuela Alto" – Nil Moliner; "Selena" – Paula Cendejas; "5 Estrellas" – Marc Seguí; "Maníaca" – Abraham Mateo; "No Siempre Quedará París" – Leo Rizzi	David Bisbal; Manuel Carrasco; Bombai; Abraham Mateo; Ana Mena; Dani Fernández
Best Collaboration	Del 40 al 1 Award
"Clavaíto" – Chanel & Abraham Mateo; "El Tonto" – Lola Índigo & Quevedo; "Olvidé Olvidarte" – Marlon & Álvaro de Luna; "Miamor" – Aitana & Rels B; "Hasta Por la Mañana" – Manuel Carrasco & Morat; "Amigos" – Pablo Alborán & María Becerra	Depol; Álvaro Soler; Miki Núñez; Polo Nández; Walls; Zzoilo
Best Urban Act	Best New Urban Act
Quevedo; Saiko; Rels B; Bad Gyal; Adexe y Nau; Chema Rivas	Saiko; Nickzzy; Cesar AC; Almacor; Francis; Soge Culebra
Best Tour, Festival or Concert
El Dragón Tour – Lola Índigo; *Love the Twenties; La Cuarta Hoja Tour – Pablo Alborán; alpha Tour – Aitana; Bellodrama Tour – Ana Mena; Boombastic
International
Best Act	Best Live Act
Loreen; Dua Lipa; Olivia Rodrigo; Taylor Swift; Miley Cyrus; Sam Smith	Tom Odell; Coldplay; Loreen; Beyoncé; Taylor Swift; Lizzo
Best Album	Best Song
Midnights – Taylor Swift; Broken by Desire to Be Heavenly Sent – Lewis Capaldi; Endless Summer Vacation – Miley Cyrus; Gloria – Sam Smith; - – Ed Sheeran; Guts – Olivia Rodrigo	"Dance the Night" – Dua Lipa; "Calm Down" – Rema; "Flowers" – Miley Cyrus; "Miracle" – Calvin Harris & Ellie Goulding; "Tattoo" – Loreen; "Unholy" – Sam Smith & Kim Petras
Global Latin
Best Act	Best New Act
Camilo; Carín León; Karol G; Shakira; Manuel Turizo; Maluma	Young Miko; Lil Cake; Peso Pluma; Milo J; Yng Lvcas; Emilia
Best Album	Best Song
2000 – Manuel Turizo; Feliz Cumpleaños Ferxxo Te Pirateamos el Álbum – Feid; La Vida es Una – Myke Towers; Mañana Será Bonito – Karol G; Afro – Ozuna; Playa Saturno – Rauw Alejandro	"El Merengue" – Manuel Turizo; "Coco Loco" – Maluma; "Ella Baila Sola" – Eslabón Armado & Peso Pluma; "Tonta" – Nathy Peluso; "Cupido" – Tini; "Vagabundo" – Sebastián Yatra, Manuel Turizo & Beéle
Best Video	Best Live Act
"Corazón Vacío" – María Becerra; "Shakira: Bzrp Music Sessions, Vol. 53" – Bizarrap & Shakira; "Funk Rave" – Anitta; "El Merengue" – Manuel Turizo; "TQG" – Karol G & Shakira; "Copa Vacía" – Shakira & Manuel Turizo	Duki; Ozuna; Mora; Myke Towers; Tini; Camilo
Best Collaboration	Best Urban Act or Producer
"No Se Ve" – Emilia & Ludmilla; "Arranca" – Becky G & Omega; "Ni Me Debes Ni Te Debo" – Carín León & Camilo; "Vagabundo" – Sebastián Yatra, Manuel Turizo & Beéle; "Ella Tiene" – Nathy Peluso & Tiago PZK; "Ella Baila Sola" – Eslabón Armado & Peso Pluma	Feid; Ozuna; María Becerra; Myke Towers; Bizarrap; Duki
Best Tour, Festival or Concert	Best Urban Collaboration
2000 Tour – Manuel Turizo; Antes de Ameri World Tour – Duki; Ferxxo Nitro Jam World Tour – Feid; La Bresh; Saturno World Tour – Rauw Alejandro; Bizarrap World Tour – Bizarrap	"Hey Mor" – Feid & Ozuna; "Classy 101" – Feid & Young Miko; "Uh Lala" – Myke Towers & Daddy Yankee; "Los del Espacio" – Lit Killah, Duki, Emilia, Tiago PZK, FMK, Rusherking, María Becerra & Big One; "TQG" – Karol G & Shakira; "Shakira: Bzrp Music Sessions, Vol. 53" – Bizarrap & Shakira
Best Urban Song
"Classy 101" – Feid & Young Miko; "Lala" – Myke Towers; "Where She Goes" – Bad Bunny; "Eva Longoria" – Ozuna; "Qlona" – Karol G & Peso Pluma; "Holanda" – Jhayco
Golden Music Award
Shakira; Take That; Ozuna
