= Rvfv (singer) =

Spanish singer (born 2001)

- Born: Rafael Ruiz Amador; 24 April 2001 (age 25); Almería, Andalusia, Spain
- Occupations: Singer; rapper
- Years active: 2017–present
- Musical career
- Origin: Almería, Spain
- Genres: Reggaeton; Latin rap
- Instruments: Vocals
- Label: Universal

Rafael Ruiz Amador (born 24 April 2001), known professionally as Rvfv, is a Spanish singer and rapper. Rafa has born and grow up in the neighborhood Pescaderia-La Chanca, Almería, Andalucía. He rose to prominence in 2019 following the release of "Prendío" and "Mirándote", which were certified gold singles by FIMI in Italy. Rvfv won "Best Debuting Urban Artist" and "Best Urban Song" with his remix of "Prendío" at the 2021 Premios Odeón.

== Career ==
=== 2017–2021: Career beginnings ===
Rvfv began his musical career in 2017 with the release of "Sonido de barrio" at the age of 16. In 2019, Rvfv released the single "Prendío", and, two months later, released "Mirándote". Both singles have since reached over 56 million and 115 million views on YouTube, respectively.

=== 2022–present: Debut albums and EPs ===
In 2022, Rvfv released his debut album, "Nastu". The album features fifteen singles. On 9 June 2022, Rvfv was featured on "Hace calor", a release with Sfera Ebbasta, DJ Omar Varela, and Argentine singer Kaleb Di Masi. The video has gained over 42 million views on YouTube since its release. On 2 December 2022, Rvfv released his debut EP, Metamorfosis. In 2023, Rvfv collaborated with Ebbasta and Anitta on the song "Capitán". In 2024, Rvfv released his second album titled El tiburón. The album includes twenty singles and numerous guest appearances from other musicians including Lola Índigo and David Bisbal.

In 2025, Rvfv was featured as an advisor on the tenth season of La Voz Kids, aiding is decisions for fellow collaborator Lola Índigo's team.

== Artistry ==
Rvfv has been credited with incorporating several styles into his music. His work often is cited as having urban influences, along with rap, dancehall, Afro trap, and reggaeton elements.

== Discography ==
=== Albums ===
List of studio albums, with selected details
Title	Details
Nastu	Released: 28 January 2022 (SPA)
El tiburón	Released: 31 May 2024 (SPA)
Éxitos España	Released: 19 Jun 2026 (SPA)

=== EPs ===
List of extended plays, with selected details
Title	Details
Metamorfosis	Released: 2 December 2022 (SPA)
503 Maffia	Released: 1 May 2025 (SPA)

=== Singles ===
- 2017 : Afro&trap
- 2017 : Running
- 2018 : Todo okey
- 2018 : Bad boy
- 2018 : Bellaqueo
- 2019 : Prendío
- 2019 : Bloque activo
- 2019 : Mirándote
- 2019 : Apriétala (feat. Pablo Mas)
- 2019 : L.a.n.a
- 2019 : Mi consuelo (feat. Keen Levy)
- 2019 : Prendio (Remix) (feat. Daviles de Novelda, Omar Montes)
- 2020 : No quiero verte (feat. Keen Levy)
- 2020 : Baby (feat. El Daddy Daviles de Novelda)
- 2020 : Gracias a Diosito 2020 – Fé (feat? Pablo Mas)
- 2020 : Trendy (feat Lola Índigo)
- 2020 : No puedo amar (feat. Omar Montes)
- 2020 : Normal que lo se crea (Daviles de Novelda, Omar Montes, Rvfv feat. Keen Levy)
- 2020 : Fake capo (Remix) (feat. Karetta el Gucci, Omar Montes)
- 2020 : Yo no sé (feat. Pablo Mas)
- 2020 : Una noche (feat. Liderj)
- 2021 : Lejos de mi (feat. Maka)
- 2021 : Te sale (Remix) (feat. Lennis Rodriguez)
- 2021 : Carmela (Remix) (feat. Sami Duque, Keen Levy)
- 2021 : Todo lo cambié (feat. Pablo Mas)
- 2021 : Nena mala (feat. Keen Levy)
- 2021 : No quiero amor (feat. Omar Montes)
- 2021 : Diferente 2.0 (feat. Pablo Mas)
- 2021 : Confiésale (feat. Nyno Vargas)
- 2021 : Romeo y Julieta (feat. Lola Índigo)
- 2021 : La historia Remix (feat. El Taiger, Jd Pantoja)
- 2021 : Aléjate (with David Marley)
- 2021 : Bandido (Remix) (feat. Cyril Kamer, Cano)
- 2022 : Pensando en mi
- 2022 : Tigini (Remix) (with Kikimoteleba)
- 2022 : Hace calor (Remix) (with Kaleb Di Masi, Sfera Ebbasta, Omar Varela)
- 2022 : Lucifer (feat. Yeieme)
- 2022 : Pantera (feat. Duki)
- 2022 : K alegría (feat. Dellafuente)
- 2022 : Mi Grammy (feat. Dellafuente, Pablo Mas)
- 2022 : Dominicana (feat. Morad, Pablo Mas)
- 2022 : Recuerdas? (feat. Kaydy Cain, Los Del Control)
- 2023 : Ante (feat. Edu García)
- 2023 : Que te vaya bien 2023 – Desespero (feat Morad)
- 2023 : Capitán (feat. Anitta, Sfera Ebbasta)
- 2023 : Incomprendido (feat. Keen Levy)
- 2023 : Caramelo (feat. VillaBanks, Shiva)
- 2023 : Andaluza (feat. David Marley)
- 2023 : Mantra (feat. el Ruso, Rvfv, Samuel G feat. Liderj)
- 2023 : Spanish teteo (feat. Rels B, Omar Montes)
- 2023 : Conexiones (feat. David Marley)
- 2023 : Zafíro (Remix) (feat. J Abecia) 2023 – Casanova (Remix) (feat. Soolking, Lola Índigo)
- 2024 : ELISA (feat. Gims)
- 2024 : Rueda (feat. David Bisbal)
- 2025 : Corazón puro (feat. Morad, Rels B)
- 2025 : Mágico (feat. David Marley)
- 2025 : Revolú
- 2025 : TORA
- 2026 : Corrupta
- 2026 : TikiTaka
- 2026 : Tenías Razón
- 2026 : Muchacha (feat. Aissa)
