= La Nota =

2020 single by Manuel Turizo, Rauw Alejandro, and Myke Towers

Single by Manuel Turizo, Rauw Alejandro and Myke Towers

from the album Dopamina
- Language: Spanish
- English title: "The Note"
- Released: October 8, 2020
- Genre: Reggaeton
- Length: 3:36
- Label: La Industria; Sony Latin
- Songwriters: Juan Medina; Manuel Turizo; Michael Torres; Raúl Alejandro Ocasio Ruiz "Rauw Alejandro"
- Producers: Santiago Mesa "Zenzei"; Marcos Masís "Tainy"; Julián Turizo

Manuel Turizo singles chronology
"Será" (2020)	"La Nota" (2020)	"Pase Lo Que Pase (Remix)" (2020)

Rauw Alejandro singles chronology
"Enchule" (2020)	"La Nota" (2020)	"Reloj" (2020)

Myke Towers singles chronology
"Mi Niña" (2020)	"La Nota" (2020)	"Only Fans" (2020)

Music video
- "La Nota" on YouTube

"La Nota" (transl. "The Note") is a song recorded by Colombian singer Manuel Turizo, with Puerto Rican singer Rauw Alejandro and Puerto Rican rapper Myke Towers for Turizo's second studio album, Dopamina (2020). It was written by Juan Medina, Turizo, Towers, Michael Torres, and Alejandro, while the production was handled by Zenzei, Tainy, and Julián Turizo. The song was released for digital download and streaming by La Industria, Inc. and Sony Music Latin on October 8, 2020, as the second single from the album. A Spanish language reggaeton song, it is about a young unmarried woman, whose mysterious and flirtatious manner drives men crazy. The track received widely positive reviews from music critics, who complimented its energy and catchy melody.

"La Nota" was nominated for Urban Song Of The Year at the 2022 Premio Lo Nuestro. The song was commercially successful, reaching number one in five countries, including Mexico and Spain, as well as the top five in several other countries such as Dominican Republic and Peru, and on Billboard's Hot Latin Songs in the United States. It also reached the summit of the Latin Airplay and Latin Rhythm Airplay charts. The song has received several certifications, including Latin 11× platinum in the United States. An accompanying music video, released simultaneously with the song, was directed by Daniel Duran and depicts the three singers turning into real-life toys, trying to catch the attention of their desired girl at an empty arcade cabinet and toy store. To promote the song, Turizo, Alejandro, and Towers performed it at the 2020 Billboard Latin Music Awards.

== Background and release ==
Inspired by good vibes and fun, Manuel Turizo and his team composed "La Nota" for Turizo's second studio album, Dopamina (2021). Since he wanted "a strong rapper" on the song, he showed it to Myke Towers, who was one of his favorite artists, and asked him to collaborate on it. Then the team decided to include Tainy to contribute to the production and finally, as Turizo "felt that a strong contrasting voice was missing", Rauw Alejandro joined the recording. During an interview with El Espectador, Turizo told the newspaper that the track "has a different sound" from what he usually hears on his songs, "but that's the idea of this album that's on the way".

On October 8, 2020, "La Nota" was released for digital download and streaming by La Industria, Inc. and Sony Music Latin as the second single from Dopamina. It was included as the sixth track on the album, released April 9, 2021.

== Music and lyrics ==
"La Nota"
A 21-second sample of the chorus

Musically, "La Nota" is a Spanish language reggaeton song, written by Juan Medina, Turizo, Towers, Michael Torres, and Alejandro. Its production was handled by Zenzei, Tainy, and Julián Turizo, and the track runs for a total of 3 minutes and 36 seconds. Lyrically, "La Nota" which translates to "The Note" in English, is a sensual song about a young unmarried woman, whose "flirtatious and mysterious" manner "drive[s] men crazy". The lyrics include, "Sin hablar tú y yo nos entendemos / Ambos sabemos lo que sigue / Y aprovecha que nos conocemos / Colaboremos pa' que se dé / Que la nota le suba pa’ que mueva su cintura" (Without speaking, you and I understand each other / We both know what's next / And take advantage of the fact that we know each other / Let's collaborate so that it happens / Let the grade go up so that you move your waist).

== Critical reception ==
Upon release, "La Nota" was met with widely positive reviews from music critics. Writing for Los 40, Jermaine Miller Miller described it a "great song" that features "a lot of energy and sensuality, but with a flow that is very contagious", naming Alejandro and Towers "the leaders of the new generation of urbano music". Happy FM critics called the melody "very catchy", saying "you won't be able to stop listening to [it] from the first moment". Billboard staff labeled the song "[a] bop", while an author of Billboard Argentina described the artists as "three of the greatest performers in the urban industry". In 2022, Ernesto Lechner from Rolling Stone ranked the track as Alejandro's 42nd-best song, naming the singer as the one who "steals the spotlight" in the collaboration, "adding tension and adrenaline to a hit that would remain middle of the road if not for the fiery inspiration of his verses".

=== Accolades ===
"La Nota" was nominated for Urban Song at the 2021 Premios Nuestra Tierra. At the 2021 MTV Millennial Awards, the song was nominated for Music-Ship of the Year, but lost to "Baila Conmigo" by Selena Gomez and Alejandro. "La Nota" was also nominated for Urban – Song Of The Year at the 34th Annual Lo Nuestro Awards. Additionally, it was acknowledged as an award-winning song at the 2021 SESAC Latina Music Awards, the 2022 ASCAP Latin Awards, and the 2022 BMI Latin Awards.

== Commercial performance ==
"La Nota" debuted at number 11 on the US Billboard Hot Latin Songs chart on October 24, 2020, becoming Turizo's 17th entry, Alejandro's 9th, and Towers' 19th. On January 23, 2021, the track reached its peak of number five, giving both Turizo and Alejandro their second top-10 hit on the chart. It also peaked at number one on both the Latin Airplay and Latin Rhythm Airplay charts on the same date. Thus it became Turizo's fourth crowning hit on both, as well as both Alejandro and Towers' third. The song was certified 11× platinum (Latin) by the Recording Industry Association of America (RIAA), for track-equivalent sales of over 660,000 units in the United States.

In Spain's official weekly chart, the song debuted at number nine on October 18, 2020. It subsequently peaked at number one on its third week, becoming Turizo's second number one hit in the country and both Alejandro and Towers' first. The track was later certified quadruple platinum by the Productores de Música de España (PROMUSICAE), for track-equivalent sales of over 160,000 units in the country. "La Nota" also peaked at number one in Chile, Colombia, Ecuador, and Mexico, and reached the top 10 in Bolivia, Costa Rica, Dominican Republic, El Salvador, Guatemala, Latin America, Panama, Peru, Puerto Rico, and Uruguay. In Mexico, the song was certified diamond + platinum by the Asociación Mexicana de Productores de Fonogramas y Videogramas (AMPROFON), for track-equivalent sales of over 360,000 units. It was also certified gold by Pro-Música Brasil for track-equivalent sales of over 20,000 units in Brazil.

== Promotion ==
=== Music video ===
A screenshot from the music video, depicting Alejandro as a toy in a claw crane.

An accompanying music video was released simultaneously with the song. During his interview with El Espectador, Turizo explained that they had to record the video five times "due to the whole issue of COVID-19". The visual was produced by 2 Wolves SOTA Films and directed by Venezuelan director Daniel Duran. It depicts the three singers turning into real-life toys, trying to get the attention of the beautiful girl they like, who is enjoying her time at an empty arcade cabinet and toy store. An author of LatinPop Brasil praised the video for its "special effects, sensuality and a touch of surprise".

=== Live performances ===
Turizo, Alejandro, and Towers gave their first live performance of "La Nota" at the 27th Annual Billboard Latin Music Awards on October 21, 2020. The song was included on the set lists for Alejandro's the Rauw Alejandro World Tour and the Vice Versa Tour.

== Track listing ==
Digital download / streaming
No.	Title	Length
1.	"La Nota"	3:36

== Credits and personnel ==
Credits adapted from Tidal.

- Manuel Turizo associated performer, composer, lyricist
- Rauw Alejandro – associated performer, composer, lyricist
- Myke Towers – associated performer, composer, lyricist
- Juan Medina – composer, lyricist
- Michael Torres – composer, lyricist
- Santiago Mesa "Zenzei" – producer, recording engineer
- Marcos Masís "Tainy" – producer
- Julián Turizo – producer
- Ernesto Padilla "Nesty" – producer
- David Daza – executive producer
- Alejandro Patiño "Mosty" – mastering engineer, mixing engineer

== Charts ==
=== Weekly charts ===
Weekly chart performance for "La Nota"
Chart (2020–2021)	Peak position
Argentina Hot 100 (Billboard)	25
Bolivia (Monitor Latino)	8
Chile (Monitor Latino)	1
Colombia (Monitor Latino)	2
Colombia (National-Report)	1
Costa Rica (Monitor Latino)	6
Dominican Republic (Monitor Latino)	4
Ecuador (Monitor Latino)	1
El Salvador (Monitor Latino)	6
Global 200 (Billboard)	59
Guatemala (Monitor Latino)	5
Honduras (Monitor Latino)	18
Latin America (Monitor Latino)	6
Mexico (Monitor Latino)	1
Mexico Airplay (Billboard)	1
Panama (Monitor Latino)	7
Paraguay (Monitor Latino)	12
Peru (Monitor Latino)	3
Portugal (AFP)	176
Puerto Rico (Monitor Latino)	2
Spain (Promusicae)	1
Uruguay (Monitor Latino)	4
US Bubbling Under Hot 100 (Billboard)	7
US Hot Latin Songs (Billboard)	5
US Latin Airplay (Billboard)	1
US Latin Rhythm Airplay (Billboard)	1
Venezuela (Monitor Latino)	16

=== Monthly charts ===
Monthly chart position for "La Nota"
Chart (2020-2021)	Peak position
Paraguay (SGP)	25
Uruguay (CUDISCO)	6

=== Year-end charts ===
2020 year-end chart performance for "La Nota"
Chart (2020)	Position
Costa Rica Urbano (Monitor Latino)	82
Dominican Republic Urbano (Monitor Latino)	84
Ecuador Urbano (Monitor Latino)	93
Peru Urbano (Monitor Latino)	71
Puerto Rico Urbano (Monitor Latino)	75
Spain (PROMUSICAE)	51

2021 year-end chart performance for "La Nota"
Chart (2021)	Position
Bolivia Latino (Monitor Latino)	90
Chile Urbano (Monitor Latino)	47
Colombia (Monitor Latino)	21
Costa Rica (Monitor Latino)	82
Dominican Republic (Monitor Latino)	84
Ecuador (Monitor Latino)	63
El Salvador (Monitor Latino)	42
Global 200 (Billboard)	200
Guatemala Pop (Monitor Latino)	82
Honduras (Monitor Latino)	86
Latin America (Monitor Latino)	45
Panama Urbano (Monitor Latino)	69
Paraguay (Monitor Latino)	48
Peru Urbano (Monitor Latino)	50
Puerto Rico Urbano (Monitor Latino)	73
Spain (PROMUSICAE)	45
US Hot Latin Songs (Billboard)	20
US Latin Airplay (Billboard)	7
US Latin Rhythm Airplay (Billboard)	6

== Certifications ==
Certifications and sales for "La Nota"
Region	Certification	Certified units/sales
Argentina (CAPIF)	Platinum	20,000^{*}
Brazil (Pro-Música Brasil)	Gold	20,000^{‡}
Mexico (AMPROFON)	Diamond+3× Platinum	480,000^{‡}
Spain (Promusicae)	4× Platinum	160,000^{‡}
United States (RIAA)	11× Platinum (Latin)	660,000^{‡}
Streaming
Central America (CFC)	4× Platinum	28,000,000^{†}
^{*} Sales figures based on certification alone.^{‡} Sales+streaming figures based on certification alone.^{†} Streaming-only figures based on certification alone.

== Release history ==
Release dates and formats for "La Nota"
Region	Date	Format(s)	Label	Ref.
Various	October 8, 2020	Digital download; streaming	Sony Music Latin; La Industria, Inc.	
Latin America	October 9, 2020	Contemporary hit radio	Sony Music Latin; La Industria, Inc.	
Italy	October 23, 2020	Contemporary hit radio	Sony Music Latin; La Industria, Inc.	

== See also ==
- 2020 in Latin music
- 2021 in Latin music
- List of best-selling singles in Spain
- List of Billboard Hot Latin Songs and Latin Airplay number ones of 2021
- List of Billboard Mexico Airplay number ones
- List of number-one songs of 2020 (Mexico)
- List of number-one singles of 2020 (Spain)
