= Una Lady Como Tú =

Single by Manuel Turizo

from the album ADN
- Language: Spanish
- Released: March 16, 2017
- Genre: Reggaeton
- Length: 3:33
- Label: La Industria Inc.
- Songwriters: Christian Mena; Manuel Turizo Zapata; Julian Turizo; Santiago Mesa; Carlos Cossio

Manuel Turizo singles chronology
"Baila Conmigo" (2016)	"Una Lady Como Tú" (2016)	"Déjate Llevar" (2017)

Music video
- Una Lady Como Tú on YouTube

Una Lady Como Tú is a song by the Colombian singer Manuel Turizo released on March 16, 2017 along with a music video. A remix version featuring Nicky Jam was released on August 4, 2017. Both versions were later featured on Turizo's debut album ADN, released in 2019.

== Background ==
"Una Lady Como Tú" was written by Christian Mena, Manuel Turizo, Julian Turizo, Santiago Mesa and Carlos Cassio.

== Commercial performance ==
In Europe, "Una Lady Como Tú" peaked the number two in Spain, In Italy, the song peaked the number 58.

In Latin America, the song topped the charts of El Salvador and Paraguay, reached top 5 in Bolivia, Chile, Colombia, Costa Rica, Ecuador, Honduras, Mexico, Nicaragua, Panama and Peru and reached top 20 in Argentina, and Dominican Republic.

In the United States, "Una Lady Como Tú" received a 8x Latin platinum certification by the Recording Industry Association of America (RIAA) on April 25, 2019, for units of over 480,000 sales plus track-equivalent streams. It was also received four platinum by the Spanish Music Producers (PROMUSICAE), platinum by Federazione Industria Musicale Italiana (FIMI) and a double diamond+platinum+gold certification by Asociación Mexicana de Productores de Fonogramas y Videogramas (AMPROFON).

== Music video ==
"Una Lady Como Tú" was released on Manuel Turizo's YouTube channel on 16 March 2017. As of September 2025, the song has received over 2 billion views.

== Charts ==
Weekly chart performance for "Una Lady Como Tú"
Chart (2016–17)	Peak position
Argentina (Monitor Latino)	16
Bolivia (Monitor Latino)	5
Chile (Monitor Latino)	3
Colombia (National-Report)	3
Colombia (Monitor Latino)	3
Costa Rica (Monitor Latino)	4
Dominican Republic (Monitor Latino)	11
Ecuador (Monitor Latino)	5
El Salvador (Monitor Latino)	1
Guatemala (Monitor Latino)	2
Honduras (Monitor Latino)	7
Italy (FIMI)	58
Mexico Airplay (Billboard)	2
Mexico (Monitor Latino)	2
Nicaragua (Monitor Latino)	4
Panama (Monitor Latino)	4
Paraguay (Monitor Latino)	1
Peru (Monitor Latino)	2
Spain (PROMUSICAE)	2
US Hot Latin Songs (Billboard)	32
US Latin Airplay (Billboard)	41
US Latin Pop Airplay (Billboard)	21
US Latin Rhythm Airplay (Billboard)	19

=== Year-end charts ===
2017 year-end chart performance for "Una Lady Como Tú"
Chart (2017)	Position
Spain (PROMUSICAE)	12

== Certifications ==
Certifications and sales for "Una Lady Como Tú"
Region	Certification	Certified units/sales
Italy (FIMI)	Platinum	50,000^{‡}
Mexico (AMPROFON)	3× Diamond+3× Platinum	1,080,000^{‡}
Spain (Promusicae)	5× Platinum	300,000^{‡}
Spain (Promusicae) Remix version	3× Platinum	120,000^{‡}
United States (RIAA)	8× Platinum (Latin)	480,000^{‡}
^{‡} Sales+streaming figures based on certification alone.
