= Qué Pecao =

Single by Manuel Turizo and Kapo

from the album 201
- Language: Spanish
- English title: "What a sin"
- Released: October 3, 2024
- Genre: Bachata; Latin pop; reggaeton
- Length: 3:51
- Label: La Industria, Inc.; Sony Latin
- Songwriters: Juan David Loaiza; Manuel Turizo; Spread Lof; Joel Iglesias; Juan Diego Medina; Alejandro Ramírez; José Felizzola; Daniel Rondón
- Producer: Sky Rompiendo

Manuel Turizo singles chronology
"Enhorabuena" (2024)	"Qué Pecao" (2024)	"Sígueme Besando Aasí" (2024)

Kapo singles chronology
"Uwaie" (2024)	"Qué Pecao" (2024)	"Imagínate" (2024)

Music video
- "Qué Pecao" on YouTube

"Qué Pecao" (transl. "What a sin") is a song by Colombian singers and songwriters Manuel Turizo and Kapo. It was released by La Industria, Inc. on October 3, 2024 as an original single and on November 22 of the same year as the first track of Turizo's fourth studio album 201 through Sony Music Latin.

== Background ==
"Qué Pecao" was written by Manuel Turizo, Spread Lof, Joel Iglesias and Sky Rompiendo, the latter in whom also produced the song. Later, Turizo wanted to contact Kapo to write the song together. They sang their song in La Revuelta with David Broncano on the Spanish television channel La 1, coinciding before the release of their song.

== Music video ==
The music video for "Qué Pecao" was released on the same day as the song and the same day they sang in La Revuelta. It was recorded in various locations in Colombia. It shows Elena Marín, Turizo and Kapo in various rooms, and a beach can be seen when they open the door.

== Charts ==
=== Weekly charts ===
Chart (2024)	Peak position
Honduras (Monitor Latino)	6
Panama (PRODUCE)	6
Spain (Promusicae)	9

== Certifications ==
Region	Certification	Certified units/sales
Spain (Promusicae)	Platinum	60,000^{‡}
^{‡} Sales+streaming figures based on certification alone.
