= En Privado =

2025 single by Xavi and Manuel Turizo

Single by Xavi and Manuel Turizo

from the album Dosis
- Released: February 8, 2025
- Genre: Bachata
- Length: 3:19
- Label: Interscope
- Songwriters: Joshua Xavier Gutierrez; Manuel Turizo; Fabio Gutierrez; Andy Clay; Carlos Dominguez; Roberto Sierra; Giovel Simon; Juan Medina
- Producer: Clay

Xavi singles chronology
| "SRT" (2024) | "En Privado" (2025) | "Hija de Papi" (2025) |

Manuel Turizo singles chronology
| "Feliz Año Nuevo" (2025) | "En Privado" (2025) | "Que Haces" (2025) |

Music video
- "En Privado" on YouTube

"En Privado" (In Private) is a single by American singer-songwriter Xavi and Colombian singer Manuel Turizo, released on February 8, 2025. It was produced by Andy Clay.

== Composition ==
The song blends bachata and corridos tumbados. It finds the singers expressing their adoration for their respective lovers and making exciting offers and invitations, such as vacations to Cancún and Dubai.

== Critical reception ==
Lucas Villa of Remezcla wrote "For this being Xavi's first bachata song, his corrido-built voice sounds great among the tropical rhythms. He taps into the sensual side of his artistry with Turizo's sultry baritone voice in this sweet serenade perfect for Valentine's Day." Similarly, Jovita Trujillo of ¡Hola! called the song "an irresistible, dance-worthy anthem—just in time for Valentine's Day."

== Charts ==
=== Weekly charts ===
Weekly chart performance for "En Privado"
| Chart (2025) | Peak position |
|---|---|
| Global 200 (Billboard) | 90 |
| US Bubbling Under Hot 100 (Billboard) | 4 |
| US Hot Latin Songs (Billboard) | 11 |

=== Year-end charts ===
Year-end chart performance for "En Privado"
| Chart (2025) | Position |
|---|---|
| Global 200 (Billboard) | 187 |
| US Hot Latin Songs (Billboard) | 21 |
