= Kapo (singer) =

Colombian singer (born 1997)

- Born: Juan David Loaiza Sepúlveda; 15 December 1997 (age 28); Zaragoza, Antioquia, Colombia
- Genres: Reggaeton; Afrobeat
- Occupation: Singer
- Instrument: Vocals
- Years active: 2019–present
- Label: La Industria Inc.

Juan David Loaiza Sepúlveda (born 15 December 1997), known professionally as Kapo, is a Colombian singer in the reggaeton and Afrobeat genres.

== Early life ==
Kapo was born in Zaragoza, near Medellín, and grew up in El Cabuyal, a suburb near Cali. His stage name comes from his father's nickname. From a young age, he became interested in traditional Colombian music, which led him to write his first song, "Yo tengo un sueño," at the age of 13. At 16, he moved to the capital, Bogotá, where he sought opportunities for his musical career. There, he participated in the impersonation reality show Yo Me Llamo, imitating Puerto Rican rapper Cosculluela. Later, he spent around two years in Panama as a backup singer for reggae and reggaeton artist Mr. Saik.

== Musical career ==
In 2019, Kapo was discovered by the music production company La Industria Inc., home to artists such as Manuel Turizo and Nicky Jam. This allowed him to meet other established artists in the genre and release music regularly. He released his first international hits in 2024, with Afrobeat-style songs. His song "Ohnana" charted on the Hot Latin Songs and Billboard Global 200 charts, as did his song "UWAIE," which quickly went viral on TikTok. Kapo said he wrote "Ohnana" in Jamaica after a breakup to recreate the comfort of childhood mornings with his mother and have a song to enjoy by the pool the next day, and this song marked a turning point where he became less focused on commercial success and more focused on the emotional impact of his music. In 2024, he became supported by Amazon Music's Artist Development Program, which focuses on new artists. On 3 July 2025, he released his album Por Si Alguien Nos Escucha, debuting at #1 on Billboard Top Latin Pop Albums and #24 on Top Latin Albums.

== Discography ==
=== Studio albums ===
List of studio albums, with selected details
Title	Details
Por Si Alguien Nos Escucha	Released: 3 July 2025; Label: La Industria/Sony Music Latin; Formats: Digital download, streaming

=== Singles ===
==== As lead artist ====
Title	Year	Peak chart positions										Certifications	Album
Title	Year	USA Bub.	USA Latin	BOL	CHI	COL	ECU	ESP	GLO	ITA	PER	Certifications	Album
"Ohnana"	2024	—	11	—	—	—	—	2	—	—	—	* RIAA: Platinum (Latin): PROMUSICAE: 4× Platinum	Por Si Alguien Nos Escucha
"Uwaie"	2024	—	16	—	—	—	—	2	—	—	—	* RIAA: Platinum (Latin): PROMUSICAE: 2× Platinum	Por Si Alguien Nos Escucha
"Aloh Aloh"	2025	—	—	—	—	—	—	25	—	—	—	* PROMUSICAE: Gold	Por Si Alguien Nos Escucha
"Ily" (with Myke Towers)	2025	—	—	—	—	—	—	14	—	—	—		Por Si Alguien Nos Escucha
"X Ti" (with Feid)	2025	—	—	—	—	—	—	29	—	—	—		Por Si Alguien Nos Escucha
"Dónde" (with Ryan Castro)	2025	—	—	—	—	—	—	40	—	—	—		Por Si Alguien Nos Escucha

==== As featured artist ====
Title	Year	Peak chart positions										Certifications	Album
Title	Year	USA Bub.	USA Latin	BOL	CHI	COL	ECU	ESP	GLO	ITA	PER	Certifications	Album
"Qué Pecao" (with Manuel Turizo)	2024	—	—	—	—	—	—	9	—	—	—	* PROMUSICAE: Platinum	201
"Imagínate" (with Danny Ocean)	2024	—	32	—	—	—	—	12	—	—	—	* PROMUSICAE: 2x Platinum	Non-album singles
"Passoa" (with Jhayco)	2024	—	—	—	—	—	—	36	—	—	—	* RIAA: Platinum (Latin): PROMUSICAE: Gold	Le Clique: Vida Rockstar (X)
"El Sticker" (with Criss and Ronny)	2024	—	—	—	—	—	—	—	—	—	—	—	La Moral
"Alma" (with Zaider)	2024	—	—	—	—	—	—	—	—	—	—	—	Non-album singles
Más Que Tú (with Ozuna)	2025	—	43	—	—	—	—	39	—	—	—	—	TBA

== Awards and nominations ==
Award	Year	Recipient(s) and nominee(s)	Category	Result	Ref.
iHeartRadio Music Awards	2025	Kapo	Best New Latin/Urban Artist	Won	
LOS40 Music Awards	2024	Kapo	Best Latin New Act	Won	
Lo Nuestro Awards	2025	Kapo	Male Pop-Rock/Urban New Artist of the Year	Won	
Lo Nuestro Awards	2025	"Ohnana"	Urban Song of the Year	Nominated	
