= El Merengue =

2023 single by Marshmello and Manuel Turizo

Single by Marshmello and Manuel Turizo

from the album 2000 and Sugar Papi
- Released: March 3, 2023
- Recorded: 2022
- Genre: Merengue; EDM; Latin pop
- Length: 3:09
- Label: Joytime Collective; Sony Latin
- Songwriters: Christopher Comstock; Manuel Turizo
- Producer: Marshmello

Marshmello singles chronology
"Old School" (2023)	"El Merengue" (2023)	"Grown Man" (2023)

Manuel Turizo singles chronology
"Extasis" (2022)	"El Merengue" (2022)	"Vagabundo" (2022)

Music video
- "El Merengue" on YouTube

"El Merengue" is a song by American DJ and record producer Marshmello and Colombian singer Manuel Turizo, released as a single on March 3, 2023, by Joytime Collective.

== Music video ==
The music video for "El Merengue" was released on March 3, 2023, on both Marshmello's and Turizo's YouTube channels. It reached 100 million views in September 2023.

== Charts ==
=== Weekly charts ===
Weekly chart performance for "El Merengue"
Chart (2023)	Peak position
Canada Hot 100 (Billboard)	50
Global 200 (Billboard)	103
Portugal (AFP)	7
Romania Airplay (Media Forest)	8
Spain (Promusicae)	3
Switzerland (Schweizer Hitparade)	81
US Bubbling Under Hot 100 (Billboard)	10
US Hot Dance/Electronic Songs (Billboard)	5
US Hot Latin Songs (Billboard)	24
US Latin Airplay (Billboard)	1

=== Year-end charts ===
Year-end chart performance for "El Merengue"
Chart (2023)	Position
Global 200 (Billboard)	170
US Hot Dance/Electronic Songs (Billboard)	7
US Hot Latin Songs (Billboard)	49

== Certifications ==
Certifications for "El Merengue"
Region	Certification	Certified units/sales
Brazil (Pro-Música Brasil)	Gold	20,000^{‡}
Canada (Music Canada)	Platinum	80,000^{‡}
France (SNEP)	Gold	100,000^{‡}
Italy (FIMI)	Gold	50,000^{‡}
Mexico (AMPROFON)	4× Platinum	560,000^{‡}
Portugal (AFP)	4× Platinum	40,000^{‡}
Spain (Promusicae)	11× Platinum	660,000^{‡}
Switzerland (IFPI Switzerland)	Platinum	20,000^{‡}
United States (RIAA)	6× Platinum (Latin)	360,000^{‡}
Streaming
Chile (Profovi)	Gold	14,094,794
^{‡} Sales+streaming figures based on certification alone.

== Release history ==
Region	Date	Format	Version	Label
Various	March 3, 2023	Digital download; streaming	Joytime Collective	
