= Vagabundo (song) =

Single by Sebastián Yatra, Manuel Turizo and Beéle

from the album Milagro
- Language: Spanish
- English title: "Homeless"
- Released: May 11, 2023
- Genre: Merengue; pop
- Length: 3:36
- Label: Universal Latino
- Songwriters: Andrés Torres; Mauricio Rengifo; Sebastián Obando Giraldo; Brandon de Jesús López Orozco; Manuel Turizo Zapata; Julián Turizo Zapata; Diego León Vélez
- Producers: Andrés Torres; Mauricio Rengifo

Sebastián Yatra singles chronology
"Una Noche Sin Pensar" (2023)	"Vagabundo" (2023)	"Energía Bacana" (2023)

Manuel Turizo singles chronology
"El Merengue" (2023)	"Vagabundo" (2023)	"Bentley (Remix)" (2023)

Beéle singles chronology
"Guaro" (2023)	"Vagabundo" (2023)	"Tú Sí" (2023)

Music video
- "Vagabundo" on YouTube

"Vagabundo" (transl. Homeless) is a song recorded by the Colombian singers Sebastián Yatra, Manuel Turizo and Beéle. It was released on May 11, 2023. The song was written by Sebastián Yatra, Manuel Turizo, Andrés Torres, Mauricio Rengifo, Brandon de Jesús López Orozco, Julián Turizo and Diego León Vélez, and produced by Andrés Torres and Mauricio Rengifo.

== Background and release ==
Sebastián Yatra published a preview of his new song at the end of April 2023 and at the beginning of May he announced its release scheduled for May 11.

== Music and lyrics ==
Musically, "Vagabundo" is a merengue dance song that fuses Latin pop. Lyrically, it is a merengue inspired by the music of bandas or even the song "Niña Bonita" by Chino & Nacho, from Venezuela, but in Colombian version. The lyrics include, "Puedes salir con cualquiera, na-na-na-na-na / Pasarte la borrachera, na-na-na-na-na / Tatuarte la Biblia entera no te va ayudar / A olvidarte de un amor que no se va a acabar / Puedo estar con todo el mundo, na-na-na-na-na / Dármelas de vagabundo, na-na-na-na-na / Y aunque a veces me confundo y creo que voy a olvidar / Tú dejaste ese vacío que nadie va a llenar".

== Cover ==
The cover was painted by the Colombian artist Nats Garu and it represents Sebastián Yatra, Manuel Turizo and Beéle as little ones inside a glass of frozen soda with lemon and a large person holding the glass.

== Promotion ==
=== Music video ===
A screenshot from the music video, which shows Yatra, Turizo and Beéle at a party inside the ship.

The music video was released with the single simultaneously on May 11, 2023. In it, you can first see a shirtless Sebastián Yatra in an affected area where the police arrived to find out what happened. Next to it is Manuel Turizo. Then, it comes out that a few hours before, a woman gets out of the car to take pictures with people and that people see that it is cloudy with a high probability that it is going to rain and then people get on a boat and we can see everyone dancing and Bee him singing too. Then, inside the boat, Manuel Turizo is seen singing along with Sebastián Yatra. Then Sebastián Yatra is seen jumping with a woman from the boat and a shark chases them and they quickly get on the boat again. The video ends with someone following the boat and then, as seen at the beginning of the video, we see Yatra and Turizo next to the police at the place where something terrible happened.

=== Lyric video ===
The lyric video was released on May 30, 2023.

=== Live performances ===
In the Kings & Queens League final, in August 2023, Yatra performed the song alongside Turizo and Beéle.

== Charts ==
Chart performance for "Vagabundo"
Chart (2023)	Peak position
Argentina Hot 100 (Billboard)	32
Ecuador (Billboard)	21
Global 200 (Billboard)	167
Peru (Billboard)	19
Spain (Promusicae)	4
US Hot Latin Songs (Billboard)	35
US Latin Airplay (Billboard)	1
US Latin Pop Airplay (Billboard)	1

== Certifications ==
Certifications for "Vagabundo"
Region	Certification	Certified units/sales
Brazil (Pro-Música Brasil)	Gold	20,000^{‡}
Spain (Promusicae)	9× Platinum	540,000^{‡}
United States (RIAA)	8× Platinum (Latin)	480,000^{‡}
^{‡} Sales+streaming figures based on certification alone.

== See also ==
- List of Billboard Hot Latin Songs and Latin Airplay number ones of 2023
