= Manuel Turizo =

Colombian singer (born 2000)

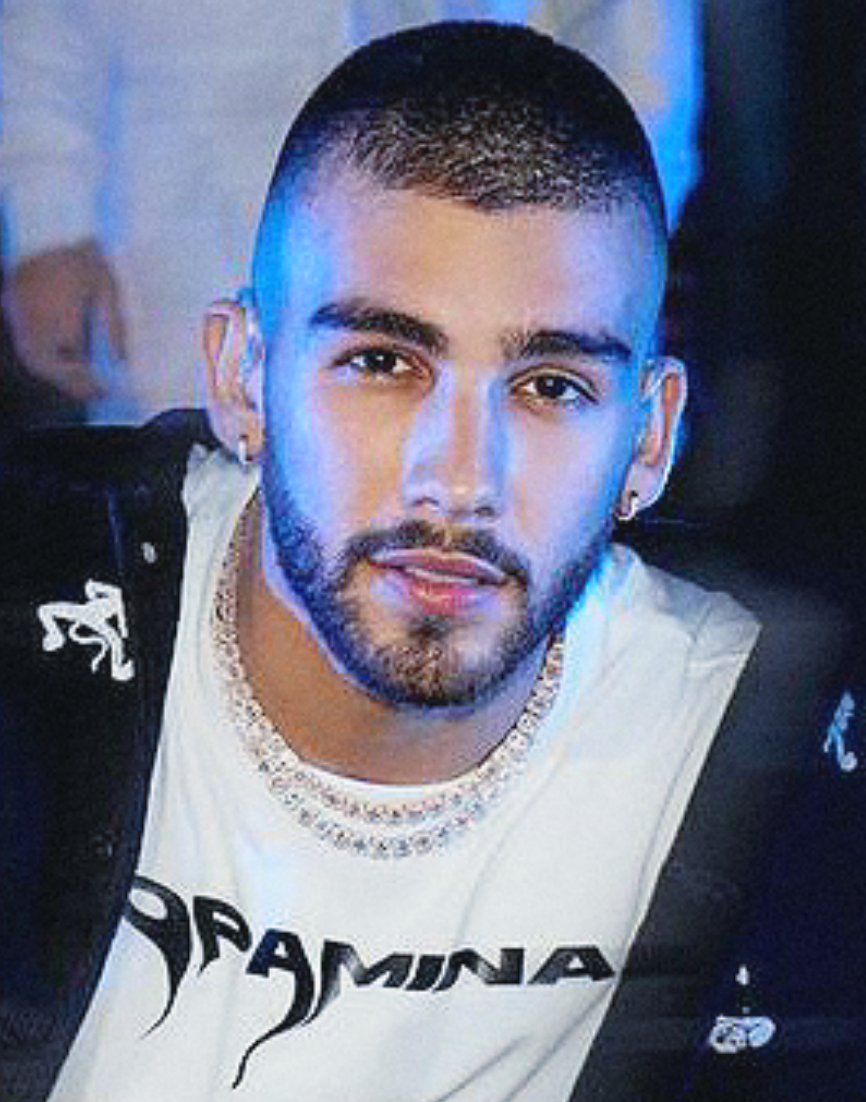
- Turizo in 2020

Background information
- Also known as: MTZ
- Born: Manuel Turizo Zapata; 12 April 2000 (age 26); Montería, Córdoba, Colombia
- Genres: Latin Pop; Reggaeton; urban pop
- Occupation: Singer
- Instrument: Vocals
- Works: Discography
- Years active: 2016–present
- Label: La Industria Inc.
- Website: manuelturizo.com

Manuel Turizo Zapata (Latin American Spanish pronunciation: [maˈnwel tuˈɾiso saˈpata]; born 12 April 2000) is a Colombian singer. Born and raised in Montería, he started making music at 13. He first became popular with his song "Una Lady Como Tú" (2016). He made his debut album ADN on August 23, 2019. Turizo's music contains influences from pop music, trap, and vallenato, and his vocal range has been classified as baritone. His most well-known song is his 2022 single "La Bachata".

== Career ==
=== 2000–2015: Early life and musical beginnings ===
Manuel Turizo grew up in the Colombian coastal town of Montería and began making music at age thirteen. In 2000, when Turizo was born, his parents had gifted a guitar and microphone to his older brother, Julian—who was only two at the time—so he would "…not get jealous" of the attention they would be giving to the newborn Manuel. Years later, Turizo attempted to learn to play his brother's guitar, but felt he did not have the aptitude for it, and thus began developing his singing voice. His original goal was to be a veterinarian, but he decided to pursue music after singing lessons with a Cuban music teacher. As a child, Turizo would practice vocals by singing along to his favourite songs, while his brother accompanied him on vocal harmonies, guitar and ukulele. Later, he began writing songs more consistently, while his brother was away earning his post-graduate in Medellín.

=== 2016–present: "Una Lady Como Tú", success, and ADN ===
Turizo started his musical career in 2016 with his first two self-released singles, "Baila Conmigo" and "Vámonos". They were followed by his best known for his hit single "Una Lady Como Tú", released on 16 March 2017, which granted him widespread popularity in Latin America; the music video for the song has, as of June 2020, received over 1.4 billion views on YouTube. Within a year of its release, "Una Lady Como Tú" was streamed more than 235 million times on Spotify. This hit was followed by "Bésame" (May 2017) on which he collaborated with Puerto Rican reggaeton singer Valentino. The success of these singles led Billboard to include Turizo in the magazine's list of "10 Latin Artists To Watch in 2018".

In September 2018, Turizo achieved his first Billboard Hot 100-charting hit with his collaboration with Ozuna on the single "Vaina Loca". The song peaked at number 94 and stayed on the chart for two weeks. In October 2018, he collaborated with Mau y Ricky on the single "Desconocidos". In March 2019, his song "Sola" became first number one song on the Billboard Latin Airplay chart. He released his debut album, ADN on 23 August 2019, which featured collaborations with Zion & Lennox, Noriel, Ozuna, Darell, Nicky Jam, Sech, and Anuel AA. ADN peaked at number eight on the Billboard Hot Latin Albums chart. In September 2019, Turizo was named as the first Latin "global priority artist" by the French streaming service Deezer. He performed a virtual concert with Billboard on 25 March 2020, while in quarantine during the COVID-19 pandemic to raise money for the non-profit organisation MusiCares. The concert consisted of a cappella renditions of the songs "Una Lady Como Tú" and "Déjala Que Vuelva".

In 2025, Turizo was featured as a coach on the tenth season of La Voz Kids Spain alongside David Bisbal, Edurne, and Lola Índigo. His final artist, Lucas Paulano, won the season, making Turizo the winning coach. He will return to the show in 2027 as a coach on the twelfth season.

== Artistry ==
Manuel Turizo comes from a family of musical talent: his father and brother Julián Turizo are musicians. The two brothers form a duo in which Manuel sings and Julián plays the ukulele. In addition to reggaeton, Turizo has also experimented with trap, R&B, and vallenato. His vocals have been described by Billboard as "sultry and deep" and his vocal range has been classified as baritone. Turizo cites Carlos Vives and Bruno Mars as his biggest musical influences. He also lists Luis Fonsi, Shakira, Sin Bandera, Justin Bieber and Chayanne as important musicians in his musical development.

== Discography ==
- ADN (2019)
- Dopamina (2021)
- 2000 (2023)
- 201 (2024)
- Apambichao (2026)
- Apambichao Vol. 2 (2026)

== Tours ==
Headlining

- ADN Tour (2019)
- Dopamina Tour (2021)
- 2000 Tour (2023)

Supporting

- USA Tour (with Sebastián Yatra)

== Filmography ==
Television
Year	Title	Role
2018–2021	la reina del Flow	Himself
2021	La suerte de Loli	Himself
2025	La Voz Kids season 10	Judge / Winning coach

== Awards and nominations ==
Award	Year	Nominated Work	Category	Result	Ref.
ASCAP Latin Awards	2019	"Déjala Que Vuelva" (with Piso 21)	Winning Song	Won	
ASCAP Latin Awards	2020	"Sola"	Winning Song	Won	
ASCAP Latin Awards	2021	"Te Quemaste" (with Anuel AA)	Winning Song	Won	
ASCAP Latin Awards	2022	"Amor En Coma" (with Maluma)	Winning Song	Won	
ASCAP Latin Awards	2022	"La Nota" (with Myke Towers y Rauw Alejandro)	Winning Song	Won	
ASCAP Latin Awards	2022	"Mala Costumbre" (with Wisin & Yandel)	Winning Song	Won	
ASCAP Latin Awards	2023	"La Bachata"	Winning Song	Won	
ASCAP Latin Awards	2024	"Copa Vacía" (with Shakira)	Winning Song	Won	
ASCAP Latin Awards	2024	"El Merengue" (with Marshmello)	Winning Song	Won	
ASCAP Latin Awards	2025	"De Lunes a Lunes" (with Grupo Frontera)	Winning Song	Won	
ASCAP Latin Awards	2025	"Mamasota" (with Yandel)	Winning Song	Won	
Billboard Latin Music Awards	2020	Himself	New Artist of the Year	Nominated	
Billboard Latin Music Awards	2021	"TBT" (with Sebastián Yatra y Rauw Alejandro)	Latin Pop Song of the Year	Nominated	
Billboard Latin Music Awards	2023	"La Bachata"	Global 200 Latin Song of the Year	Won	
Billboard Latin Music Awards	2023	"La Bachata"	Airplay Song of the Year	Won	
Billboard Latin Music Awards	2023	"La Bachata"	Tropical Song of the Year	Won	
Billboard Latin Music Awards	2023	"El Merengue" (with Marshmello)	Tropical Song of the Year	Nominated	
Billboard Latin Music Awards	2025	"En Privado" (with Xavi)	Sales Song of the Year	Pending	
Billboard Latin Music Awards	2025	"En Privado" (with Xavi)	Tropical Song of the Year	Pending	
Heat Latin Music Awards	2019	Himself	Best New Artist	Nominated	
Heat Latin Music Awards	2019	"Déjate Llevar" (with Juan Magán, Belinda, Snova y B-Case)	Best Video	Nominated	
Heat Latin Music Awards	2021	Himself	Best Región Andina Artist	Nominated	
Heat Latin Music Awards	2022	Himself	Best Pop Artist	Nominated	
Heat Latin Music Awards	2023	Himself	Best Región Andina Artist	Nominated	
Heat Latin Music Awards	2023	"La Bachata"	Song of the Year	Nominated	
Heat Latin Music Awards	2023	"Los Cachos" (with Piso 21)	Song of the Year	Nominated	
Heat Latin Music Awards	2024	Himself	Best Región Andina Artist	Nominated	
Heat Latin Music Awards	2024	"Mamasota" (with Yandel)	Best Music Video	Nominated	
Heat Latin Music Awards	2025	Himself	Best Pop Artist	Nominated	
Heat Latin Music Awards	2025	"En Privado" (with Xavi)	Best Collaboration	Nominated	
iHeartRadio Music Awards	2019	Himself	Best New Latin Artist	Won	
iHeartRadio Music Awards	2024	Himself	Latin Pop/Reggaeton Artist of the Year	Nominated	
iHeartRadio Music Awards	2024	"La Bachata"	Latin Pop/Reggaeton Song of the Year	Nominated	
Nickelodeon Kids' Choice Awards	2023	Himself	Favorite Artist (Latin America)	Nominated	
Kids' Choice Awards Colombia	2017	"Una Lady Como Tú"	Favorite Song	Nominated	
Kids' Choice Awards Mexico	2019	Himself	Favorite Artist	Nominated	
Latin American Music Awards	2018	Himself	New Artist of the Year	Nominated	
Latin American Music Awards	2019	"Vaina Loca" (with Ozuna)	Favorite Urban Song	Nominated	
Latin American Music Awards	2023	"La Bachata"	Song of the Year	Nominated	
Latin American Music Awards	2023	"La Bachata"	Favorite Tropical Song	Won	
Latin American Music Awards	2024	Himself	Favorite Pop Artist	Nominated	
Latin American Music Awards	2024	"El Merengue" (with Marshmello)	Song of the Year	Nominated	
Latin American Music Awards	2024	"El Merengue" (with Marshmello)	Collaboration Crossover of the Year	Nominated	
Latin American Music Awards	2024	"El Merengue" (with Marshmello)	Best Tropical Collaboration	Won	
Latin Grammy Awards	2019	"Pa Olvidarte" (with ChocQuibTown, Zion & Lennox, Farruko)	Best Urban Fusion/Performance	Nominated	
Latin Grammy Awards	2023	"El Merengue" (with Marshmello)	Best Tropical Song	Nominated	
LOS40 Music Awards	2022	"La Bachata"	Best Latin Song	Won	
LOS40 Music Awards	2023	Himself	Best Latin Act	Nominated	
LOS40 Music Awards	2023	2000	Best Latin Album	Won	
LOS40 Music Awards	2023	"El Merengue" (with Marshmello)	Best Latin Song	Won	
LOS40 Music Awards	2023	"Vagabundo" (with Sebastián Yatra y Beéle)	Best Latin Song	Nominated	
LOS40 Music Awards	2023	"El Merengue" (with Marshmello)	Best Latin Video	Nominated	
LOS40 Music Awards	2023	"Copa Vacía" (with Shakira)	Best Latin Video	Nominated	
LOS40 Music Awards	2023	"Vagabundo" (with Sebastián Yatra y Beéle)	Best Latin Collaboration	Nominated	
LOS40 Music Awards	2023	2000 Tour	Best Latin Tour, Festival or Concert	Won	
LOS40 Music Awards	2024	Himself	Best Latin Act	Nominated	
LOS40 Music Awards	2024	Himself	Best Latin Live Act	Won	
LOS40 Music Awards	2024	"1000cosas" (with Lola Índigo)	Best Spanish Collaboration	Nominated	
LOS40 Music Awards	2024	"De Vuelta" (with Tiago PZK)	Best Latin Urban Collaboration	Nominated	
LOS40 Music Awards	2025	201 Tour	Best Latin Tour, Festival or Concert	Pending	
MTV Europe Music Awards	2018	Himself	Best Latin America Central Act	Nominated	
MTV Europe Music Awards	2022	Himself	Best Latin America Central Act	Nominated	
MTV Europe Music Awards	2023	Himself	Best Latin America Central Act	Nominated	
MTV Europe Music Awards	2024	Himself	Best Latin America Central Act	Won	
MTV Millennial Awards	2019	Himself	Artist + duro Colombia	Nominated	
MTV Millennial Awards	2019	Himself	#Instacrush	Nominated	
MTV Millennial Awards	2019	"Desconocidos" (with Mau y Ricky y Camilo)	Music-Ship of the Year	Nominated	
MTV Millennial Awards	2021	"La Nota" (with Myke Towers y Rauw Alejandro)	Music-Ship of the Year	Nominated	
MTV Millennial Awards	2022	Himself	Flow Artist	Nominated	
MTV Millennial Awards	2024	Manuel Turizo & his mom	Epic Kiss	Nominated	
People's Choice Awards	2024	Himself	The Male Latin Artist	Nominated	
Premios Juventud	2019	"Sola"	Best Song: Singing in the Shower	Nominated	
Premios Juventud	2019	"Desconocidos" (with Mau y Ricky y Camilo)	Best Song: Singing in the Shower	Nominated	
Premios Juventud	2019	"Desconocidos" (with Mau y Ricky y Camilo)	Best Behind the Scenes	Nominated	
Premios Juventud	2020	Himself	And Featuring...	Nominated	
Premios Juventud	2020	"Pegao" (with CNCO)	Can't Get Enough Of This Song	Nominated	
Premios Juventud	2020	"Pegao" (with CNCO)	The Perfect Mix	Nominated	
Premios Juventud	2020	"Aleluya" (with Reik)	Video With A Purpose	Nominated	
Premios Juventud	2020	"Color Esperanza" (with Various Artists)	The Quarentune	Nominated	
Premios Juventud	2021	"Mala Costumbre" (with Wisin & Yandel)	La Mezcla Perfecta	Nominated	
Premios Juventud	2023	Himself	Artist of the Youth – Male	Nominated	
Premios Juventud	2023	"El Merengue" (with Marshmello)	OMG Collaboration	Nominated	
Premios Juventud	2023	"El Merengue" (with Marshmello)	Best Tropical Mix	Nominated	
Premios Juventud	2023	"De 100 A 0"	Best Pop/Urban Song	Nominated	
Premios Juventud	2023	"Éxtasis" (with Maria Becerra)	Best Pop/Urban Collaboration	Nominated	
Premios Juventud	2023	"Vacaciones" (with Luis Fonsi)	Best Pop/Urban Collaboration	Nominated	
Premios Juventud	2023	2000	Best Pop/Urban Album	Nominated	
Premios Juventud	2023	"La Bachata"	Best Tropical Hit	Won	
Premios Juventud	2024	"De Lunes a Lunes" (with Grupo Frontera)	The Perfect Mix	Nominated	
Premios Juventud	2024	"De Lunes a Lunes" (with Grupo Frontera)	Best Regional Mexican Fusion	Nominated	
Premios Juventud	2024	"Copa Vacía" (with Shakira)	Best Pop/Urban Collaboration	Nominated	
Premios Juventud	2024	"Vagabundo" (with Sebastián Yatra y Beéle)	Best Pop/Urban Collaboration	Nominated	
Premios Juventud	2025	"Mamasota" (with Yandel)	Best Urban Mix	Pending	
Premios Juventud	2025	"En Privado" (with Xavi)	Tropical Hit	Pending	
Premios Juventud	2025	"Que Haces" (with Becky G)	Tropical Mix	Pending	
Premios Odeón	2023	"La Bachata"	Best Latin Song	Won	
Premios Lo Nuestro	2019	Himself	Revelation Artist of the Year	Nominated	
Premios Lo Nuestro	2020	"Aleluya" (with Reik)	Video of the Year	Nominated	
Premios Lo Nuestro	2021	"TBT" (with Sebastián Yatra y Rauw Alejandro)	Urban/Pop Song of the Year	Nominated	
Premios Lo Nuestro	2022	"La Nota" (with Myke Towers y Rauw Alejandro)	Urban Song of the Year	Nominated	
Premios Lo Nuestro	2022	"Amor En Coma" (with Maluma)	Urban Collaboration of the Year	Nominated	
Premios Lo Nuestro	2023	"Vacaciones" (with Luis Fonsi)	Pop Collaboration of the Year	Nominated	
Premios Lo Nuestro	2024	Himself	Male Pop Artist of the Year	Nominated	
Premios Lo Nuestro	2024	2000	Pop/Urban Album of the Year	Nominated	
Premios Lo Nuestro	2024	"Los Cachos" (with Piso 21)	Pop/Urban Collaboration of the Year	Nominated	
Premios Lo Nuestro	2024	"Vagabundo" (with Sebastián Yatra y Beéle)	Pop/Urban Collaboration of the Year	Nominated	
Premios Lo Nuestro	2024	"Éxtasis" (with Maria Becerra)	Pop/Urban Song of the Year	Nominated	
Premios Lo Nuestro	2024	"El Merengue" (with Marshmello)	Tropical Collaboration of the Year	Nominated	
Premios Lo Nuestro	2025	"Ojos. Labios. Cara"	Pop-Urban Song of the Year	Nominated	
Premios Lo Nuestro	2025	"De Lunes a Lunes" (with Grupo Frontera)	Mexican Music Song of the Year	Nominated	
Premios Tu Musica Urbano	2019	Himself	Best International Male Artist	Nominated	
Premios Tu Musica Urbano	2019	"Vaina Loca" (with Ozuna)	Best Pop Urban Song	Nominated	
Premios Tu Musica Urbano	2019	"Vaina Loca" (with Ozuna)	Collaboration of the Year	Nominated	
Premios Tu Musica Urbano	2019	"Vaina Loca" (with Ozuna)	Video of the Year	Nominated	
Premios Tu Musica Urbano	2020	Himself	Urban Top - Latin	Nominated	
Premios Tu Musica Urbano	2020	"En Cero" (with Yandel y Sebastián Yatra)	Best Pop Urban Song	Nominated	
Premios Tu Musica Urbano	2022	Himself	Top Rising Star - Male	Nominated	
Premios Tu Musica Urbano	2022	Himself	Top Artist - Pop Urban	Nominated	
Premios Tu Musica Urbano	2022	"Te Olvido"	Top Song - Pop Urban	Nominated	
Premios Tu Musica Urbano	2023	Himself	Top Artist - Male	Nominated	
Premios Tu Musica Urbano	2023	Himself	Top Artist - Pop Urban	Nominated	
Premios Tu Musica Urbano	2023	Himself	Top Social Artist	Nominated	
Premios Tu Musica Urbano	2023	"La Bachata"	Song of the Year	Nominated	
Premios Tu Musica Urbano	2023	"Los Cachos" (with Piso 21)	Song of the Year - Duo or Group	Nominated	
Premios Tu Musica Urbano	2025	Himself	Top Artist - Pop	Nominated	
Rolling Stone en Español Awards	2023	"La Bachata"	Song of the Year	Nominated	
