= La Bachata =

2022 single by Manuel Turizo

Single by Manuel Turizo

from the album 2000
- Released: May 26, 2022
- Genre: Bachata
- Length: 2:42
- Label: La Industria; Sony Music Latin
- Songwriters: Manuel Turizo; Edgar Barrera; Andrés Jael Correa Rios; Miguel Andrés Martínez; Juan Diego Medina

Manuel Turizo singles chronology
"De 100 a 0" (2022)	"La Bachata" (2022)	"Los Cachos" (2022)

"La Bachata" is a single by Colombian singer Manuel Turizo. Written by Turizo, Edgar Barrera, Andrés Jael Correa Rios, Miguel Andrés Martinez and Turizo's manager Juan Diego Medina, the song was released in May 2022 and reached number one in Argentina, Mexico, and on the US Billboard Latin Airplay charts.

== Background ==
"La Bachata", which replaces bachata's traditional guitar with electronic riffs and R&B vocals, debuted at number 44 on the US Billboard Latin Airplay chart on June 18, 2022.

The track eventually reached number six on the Global 200 and number three on the Global Excl. U.S. chart on the week of October 28, 2022, and in the same week, "La Bachata" became Turizo's fifth number-one on the US Latin Airplay chart.

The track spent 15 weeks at number one on the Billboard Argentina Hot 100.

== Charts ==
=== Weekly charts ===
Weekly chart performance for "La Bachata"
Chart (2022–2023)	Peak position
Argentina (Monitor Latino)	2
Argentina Hot 100 (Billboard)	1
Bolivia (Monitor Latino)	3
Bolivia (Billboard)	1
Central America (Monitor Latino)	1
Central America + Caribbean (FONOTICA)	1
Chile (Monitor Latino)	2
Chile (Billboard)	2
Colombia (Billboard)	2
Colombia (Monitor Latino)	1
Costa Rica (Monitor Latino)	1
Dominican Republic (Monitor Latino)	2
Ecuador (Monitor Latino)	1
Ecuador (Billboard)	1
El Salvador (Monitor Latino)	1
El Salvador (ASAP EGC)	1
Global 200 (Billboard)	6
Guatemala (Monitor Latino)	1
Honduras (Monitor Latino)	2
Italy (FIMI)	68
Latin America (Monitor Latino)	2
Mexico Airplay (Billboard)	1
Mexico (Billboard)	2
Nicaragua (Monitor Latino)	3
Panama (Monitor Latino)	4
Paraguay (Monitor Latino)	1
Peru (Monitor Latino)	1
Peru (Billboard)	1
Portugal (AFP)	5
Puerto Rico (Monitor Latino)	6
Spain (Promusicae)	1
Switzerland (Schweizer Hitparade)	23
Uruguay (Monitor Latino)	1
US Billboard Hot 100	67
US Hot Latin Songs (Billboard)	5
US Latin Airplay (Billboard)	1
US Tropical Airplay (Billboard)	1

=== Year-end charts ===
2022 year-end chart performance for "La Bachata"
Chart (2022)	Position
Argentina (Monitor Latino)	22
Bolivia (Monitor Latino)	8
Chile (Monitor Latino)	30
Colombia (Monitor Latino)	11
Costa Rica (Monitor Latino)	4
Dominican Republic (Monitor Latino)	18
Ecuador (Monitor Latino)	6
El Salvador (Monitor Latino)	4
Global 200 (Billboard)	90
Guatemala (Monitor Latino)	6
Honduras (Monitor Latino)	32
Latin America (Monitor Latino)	4
Mexico (Monitor Latino)	7
Nicaragua (Monitor Latino)	30
Panama (Monitor Latino)	22
Paraguay (Monitor Latino)	26
Peru (Monitor Latino)	8
Puerto Rico (Monitor Latino)	18
Spain (PROMUSICAE)	2
Uruguay (Monitor Latino)	13
Uruguay (CUD)	2
US Hot Latin Songs (Billboard)	31
US Latin Pop Airplay (Billboard)	8
Venezuela (Monitor Latino)	90

2023 year-end chart performance for "La Bachata"
Chart (2023)	Position
Argentina (Monitor Latino)	3
Bolivia (Monitor Latino)	9
Chile (Monitor Latino)	2
Costa Rica (Monitor Latino)	3
Colombia (Monitor Latino)	3
Dominican Republic (Monitor Latino)	28
Ecuador (Monitor Latino)	6
El Salvador (Monitor Latino)	55
El Salvador (ASAP EGC)	4
Global 200 (Billboard)	19
Guatemala (Monitor Latino)	2
Honduras (Monitor Latino)	19
Italy (FIMI)	94
Latin America (Monitor Latino)	3
Mexico (Monitor Latino)	49
Nicaragua (Monitor Latino)	9
Panama (Monitor Latino)	8
Spain (PROMUSICAE)	4
Switzerland (Schweizer Hitparade)	42
Paraguay (Monitor Latino)	3
Peru (Monitor Latino)	17
Uruguay (Monitor Latino)	5
Uruguay (CUD)	9
US Hot Latin Songs (Billboard)	35
US Latin Pop Airplay (Billboard)	7
Venezuela (Monitor Latino)	55

2024 year-end chart performance for "La Bachata"
Chart (2024)	Position
Global 200 (Billboard)	109

== Certifications ==
Certifications for "La Bachata"
Region	Certification	Certified units/sales
Brazil (Pro-Música Brasil)	2× Platinum	80,000^{‡}
Canada (Music Canada)	Platinum	80,000^{‡}
Italy (FIMI)	2× Platinum	200,000^{‡}
Mexico (AMPROFON)	2× Diamond+3× Platinum+Gold	1,890,000^{‡}
Portugal (AFP)	7× Platinum	70,000^{‡}
Spain (Promusicae)	19× Platinum	1,140,000^{‡}
Switzerland (IFPI Switzerland)	Platinum	20,000^{‡}
United States (RIAA)	22× Platinum (Latin)	1,320,000^{‡}
Streaming
Central America (CFC)	3× Platinum	21,000,000^{†}
Chile (PROFOVI)	Diamond	52,854,400
^{‡} Sales+streaming figures based on certification alone.^{†} Streaming-only figures based on certification alone.

== See also ==
- List of Billboard Hot Latin Songs and Latin Airplay number ones of 2022
- List of best-selling singles in Spain
