= Latin American Music Awards of 2023 =

Annual awards ceremony

8th Annual Latin American Music Awards
- Date: April 20, 2023
- Location: MGM Grand Arena (Las Vegas, Nevada)
- Country: United States
- Hosted by: Julián Gil; Galilea Montijo; Clarissa Molina; Natti Natasha

Highlights
- Most awards: Karol G (8)
- Most nominations: Bad Bunny (11)
- Website: Official site

Television/radio coverage
- Network: Univision; UniMás; Galavisión; Canal 5
- Viewership: 5.1 million

The 8th Annual Latin American Music Awards were held on April 20, 2023, to recognize outstanding achievements for artists in the Latin music industry of 2022, voted by the public.

The ceremony was place at the MGM Grand Arena in Las Vegas, United States, and was broadcast simultaneously on Univision, UniMás and Galavisión in the United States, and Canal 5 in México. This marks the first time in the history of the awards that the ceremony was broadcast on Univision instead of Telemundo, this was the result of TelevisaUnivision acquiring rights to the ceremony from Dick Clark Productions in September 2022. It was hosted by Argentine-Puerto Rican actor Julián Gil, Mexican presenter Galilea Montijo, Dominican actor and model Clarissa Molina and Dominican singer Natti Natasha.

The nominations were announced on March 13, 2023, with Puerto Rican singer Bad Bunny leading the nominations with eleven, followed by Becky G and Daddy Yankee with nine each. New categories were introduced such as Best Streaming Artist of the Year as well as four new collaboration categories: Collaboration Crossover of the Year, Best Collaboration – Pop/Urban, Best Collaboration – Regional Mexican and Best Collaboration – Tropical.

Colombian singer and songwriter Carlos Vives was honored with the Legacy Award, while Spanish singer and songwriter David Bisbal and American singer Prince Royce were both recognized with the Pioneer Award.

== Performers ==
Artist(s)	Song(s)
Justin Quiles; Lenny Tavarez; Blessd	"Medallo"
Pitbull; Vikina; Omar Courtz; Lil Jon	"Let's Take A Shot" "Me Pone Mal" "JUMPIN"
Lele Pons; Guaynaa	"Abajito" "De Party En Party"
Chiquis	"Porque Soy Abeja Reina"
Wisin; Emilia; Lyanno; Anuel AA	"Tu Recuerdo" "Mi Exxx"
Danna Paola	"XT4S1S"
Grupo Frontera; Carin León	"No Se Va" "Que Vuelvas"
Olga Tañón	"La Vida da Vuelta"
Becky G Peso Pluma	"Chanel"
Myke Towers	"Mi Droga"
Natti Natasha	"La Falta Que Me Haces"
David Bisbal; Olga Tañón; Ángela Aguilar	"Ajedrez" "Bulería" "Esclavo De Sus Besos" "Ave María"
Carin León	"Mil Maneras De Morir"
Prince Royce; Manuel Turizo; Zacarías Ferreira	"Me EnRD" "Stand By Me"
Justin Quiles; Myke Towers	"Whiskey y Coco"
Manuel Turizo	"El Merengue" "La Bachata"
Bad Gyal	"Chulo"
Chesca; Dalex	"Easy"
Young Miko	"Lisa"
Pepe Aguilar; Rubén Blades; Banda El Recodo de Cruz Lizárraga; Carin León	"Por Mujeres Como Tu" "Son Las Dos De La Mañana" "Perdóname"
Carlos Vives; Jesse & Joy; Lele Pons; Guaynaa; Emilia; Ryan Castro	"La Tierra Del Olvido"
Anuel AA	"Más Rica Que Ayer"

== Winners and nominees ==
The nominations were announced on March 24, 2022. The winners are listed in bold.

Artist of the Year	New Artist of the Year
**Karol G**; Bad Bunny; Becky G; Daddy Yankee; Eslabón Armado; Farruko; Ivan Cornejo; Rauw Alejandro; Romeo Santos; Rosalía	**Bizarrap**; Blessd; Edén Muñoz; Grupo Frontera; Los Lara; Luis Figueroa; Luis R. Conriquez; Quevedo; Santa Fe Klan; Yahritza y Su Esencia
Song of the Year	Album of the Year
**"Mamiii" – Becky G and Karol G**; "Bebe Dame" – Fuerza Regida and Grupo Frontera; "Despechá" – Rosalía; "Dos Oruguitas" – Sebastián Yatra; "Está Dañada" – Ivan Cornejo; "La Bachata" – Manuel Turizo; "Me Porto Bonito" – Bad Bunny and Chencho Corleone; "Quevedo: Bzrp Music Sessions, Vol. 52" – Bizarrap and Quevedo; "Sus Huellas" – Romeo Santos; "Te Felicito" – Shakira and Rauw Alejandro	**Un Verano Sin Ti – Bad Bunny**; Ahora Me Da Pena EP – Buena Vista Social Club; Dañado – Ivan Cornejo; Esquemas – Becky G; Fórmula, Vol. 3 – Romeo Santos; Jose – J Balvin; La 167 – Farruko; Legendaddy – Daddy Yankee; Motomami – Rosalía; Nostalgia – Eslabón Armado
Favorite Duo or Group	Favorite Pop Artist
**Jesse & Joy**; Los Enanitos Verdes; Maná; Mau y Ricky; Reik	**Shakira**; Anitta; Becky G; Camilo; Enrique Iglesias; Kali Uchis; Luis Fonsi; Ricky Martin; Rosalía; Sebastián Yatra
Favorite Pop Album	Favorite Pop Song
**Motomami – Rosalía**; @dannocean – Danny Ocean; De Adentro Pa Afuera – Camilo; Dharma – Sebastián Yatra; Esquemas – Becky G	**"Provenza" – Karol G**; "Bailé Con Mi Ex" – Becky G; "Junio" – Maluma; "Tacones Rojos" – Sebastián Yatra
Favorite Regional Mexican Artist	Favorite Regional Mexican Duo or Group
**Junior H**; Ángela Aguilar; Carin León; Chiquis; Christian Nodal; Edén Muñoz; Gerardo Ortiz; Ivan Cornejo; Luis R. Conriquez; Pepe Aguilar	**Grupo Firme**; Banda Los Recoditos; Banda MS de Sergio Lizárraga; Calibre 50; Eslabón Armado; Fuerza Regida; Grupo Frontera; Intocable; Los Ángeles Azules; Yahritza y Su Esencia
Favorite Regional Mexican Song	Favorite Regional Mexican Album
**"No Se Va (En Vivo)" – Grupo Frontera**; "Chale" – Edén Muñoz; "La Boda del Huitlacoche (Live)" – Carin León; "Que Te Vaya Bien" – Julión Álvarez y su Norteño Banda; "Si Me Duele Que Duela" – Intocable	**Mi Vida En Un Cigarro 2 – Junior H**; Dañado – Ivan Cornejo; Del Barrio Hasta Aquí, Vol. 2 – Fuerza Regida; Nostalgia – Eslabón Armado; Obsessed (Deluxe) – Yahritza y Su Esencia
Favorite Urban Artist	Favorite Urban Album
**Karol G**; Anuel AA; Bad Bunny; Daddy Yankee; Farruko; J Balvin; Jhayco; Natti Natasha; Ozuna; Rauw Alejandro	**Un Verano Sin Ti – Bad Bunny**; Jose – J Balvin; La 167 – Farruko; Legendaddy – Daddy Yankee; Saturno – Rauw Alejandro
Favorite Urban Song	Favorite Tropical Artist
**"Tití Me Preguntó" – Bad Bunny**; "Desesperados" – Rauw Alejandro and Chencho Corleone; "Envolver" – Anitta; "Remix" – Daddy Yankee; "Sensual Bebé" – Jhayco	**Romeo Santos**; Carlos Vives; Marc Anthony; Prince Royce; Víctor Manuelle
Favorite Tropical Album	Favorite Tropical Song
**Fórmula, Vol. 3 – Romeo Santos**; Ahora Me Da Pena EP – Buena Vista Social Club; Cumbiana II – Carlos Vives; Pa'llá Voy – Marc Anthony; The Ultimate Bachata Collection – Héctor Acosta "El Torito"	**"La Bachata" – Manuel Turizo**; "Despechá" – Rosalía; "Después de la Playa" – Bad Bunny; "Pegao" – Camilo; "Sus Huellas" – Romeo Santos
Streaming Artist of the Year	Tour of the Year
**Karol G**; Bad Bunny; Chencho Corleone; Grupo Frontera; Ivan Cornejo	$trip Love Tour – Karol G; Enfiestados y Amanecidos Tour – Grupo Firme; La Última Vuelta World Tour – Daddy Yankee; Papi Juancho World Tour – Maluma; World's Hottest Tour – Bad Bunny; Te Amo y Punto – Chayanne
Best Crossover Artist	Collaboration of the Year
**The Weeknd**; DJ Khaled; DJ Snake; Ed Sheeran; Fatman Scoop; Gims; Justin Timberlake; Lil Jon; Megan Thee Stallion; Mr. Vegas	**"Mamiii" – Becky G and Karol G**; "Bebe Dame" – Fuerza Regida and Grupo Frontera; "El Incomprendido" – Farruko, Víctor Cárdenas and DJ Adoni; "Mayor Que Usted" – Natti Natasha, Daddy Yankee and Wisin y Yandel; "Me Porto Bonito" – Bad Bunny and Chencho Corleone; "Medallo" – Blessd, Justin Quiles and Lenny Tavárez; "Que Vuelvas" – Carin León and Grupo Frontera; "Quevedo: Bzrp Music Sessions, Vol. 52" – Bizarrap and Quevedo; "Te Espero" – Prince Royce and Maria Becerra; "Te Felicito" – Shakira and Rauw Alejandro
Collaboration Crossover of the Year	Best Collaboration – Pop/Urban
**"La Fama" – Rosalía and The Weeknd**; "Arhbo" – Ozuna, Gims, Redone & FIFA Sound; "Borracho" – Sech and DJ Khaled; "Sigue" – J Balvin and Ed Sheeran; "Sin Fin" – Romeo Santos and Justin Timberlake	**"Mamiii" – Becky G and Karol G**; "Buenos Días" – Wisin, Camilo and Los Legendarios; "El Incomprendido" – Farruko, Víctor Cárdenas and DJ Adoni; "Hot" – Daddy Yankee and Pitbull; "Mayor Que Usted" – Natti Natasha, Daddy Yankee and Wisin y Yandel; "Me Porto Bonito" – Bad Bunny and Chencho Corleone; "Medallo" – Blessd, Justin Quiles and Lenny Tavárez; "Punto 40" – Rauw Alejandro and Baby Rasta; "Quevedo: Bzrp Music Sessions, Vol. 52" – Bizarrap and Quevedo; "Te Felicito" – Shakira and Rauw Alejandro
Best Collaboration – Regional Mexican	Best Collaboration – Tropical
**"Ya Acabó" – Marca MP and Becky G**; "Billete Grande (En Vivo)" – Fuerza Regida and Edgardo Nuñez; "Brindo" – Mario Bautista and Banda El Recodo; "Calidad" – Grupo Firme & Luis Mexia; "Con un Botecito a Pecho" – Adriel Favela and Carin León; "Hay Que Hacer Dinero" – Banda MS de Sergio Lizárraga and Edén Muñoz; "Jugaste y Sufri" – Eslabón Armado and DannyLux; "Que Vuelvas" – Carin León and Grupo Frontera; "Se Acabó (En vivo)" – Lenin Ramírez, Fuerza Regida & Banda Renovación; "Si Ya Hiciste el Mal" – Luis R. Conriquez and Jessi Uribe	**"Monotonía" – Shakira and Ozuna**; "Baloncito Viejo" – Carolos Vives and Camilo; "El Pañuelo" – Romeo Santos and Rosalía; "Soy Yo" – Don Omar, Wisin and Gente de Zona; "Te Espero" – Prince Royce and Maria Becerra

== Special Honor ==
- Legacy Award: Carlos Vives
- Pioneer Award: David Bisbal
- Pioneer Award: Prince Royce
