= Premio Lo Nuestro 2023 =

35th Lo Nuestro Awards
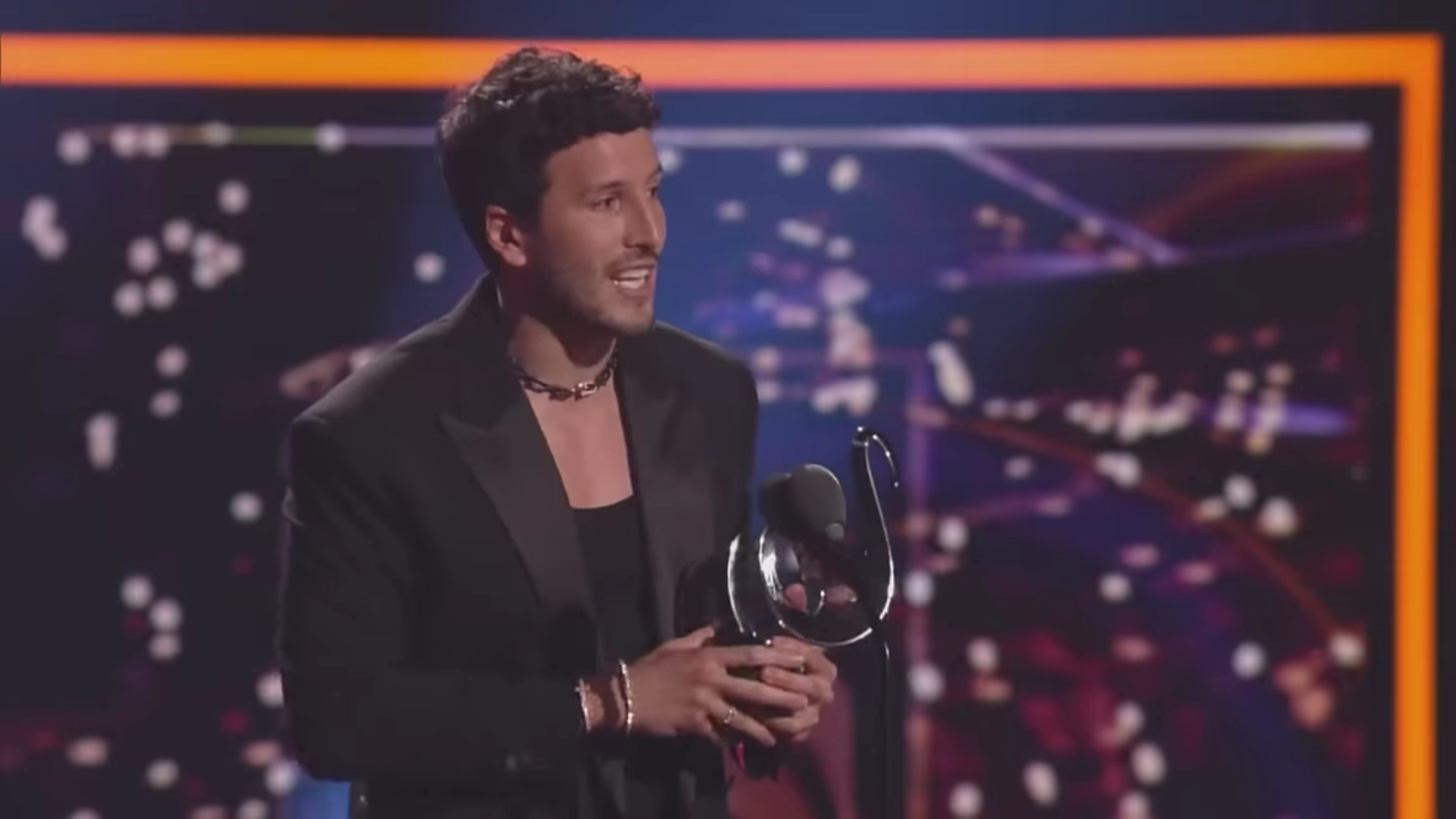
- Sebastián Yatra at the gala.
- Date: February 23, 2023
- Site: Dade Arena; Miami, Florida, U.S.
- Hosted by: Alejandra Espinoza; Adrián Uribe; Sebastián Yatra; Paulina Rubio

Highlights
- Most wins: Grupo Firme (6)
- Most nominations: Sebastián Yatra (10)

Television/radio coverage
- Network: Univision
- Viewership: 4.7 million

The 35th Lo Nuestro Awards were held at the Dade Arena in Miami on February 23, 2023, to recognize the most popular Spanish-language music of 2022. The ceremony was broadcast on Univisión and was hosted by television presenters Alejandra Espinoza and Adrián Uribe and singers Sebastián Yatra and Paulina Rubio.

The nominees were announced on January 23, 2023, with Colombian singer Sebastián Yatra leading with ten nominations, followed by Bad Bunny, Becky G, Camilo and Grupo Firme, all with nine. Seven new categories were added increasing the number of categories to thirty-nine, these categories are: Regional Mexican New Artist of the Year, Tour of the Year, Male Pop Artist of the Year, Female Pop Artist of the Year, Tropical Album of the Year, Male Regional Mexican Artist of the Year and Female Regional Mexican Artist of the Year. Voting for the winners will be available on the awards page until February 5. The ceremonies’ special merit awards include the Lifetime Achievement award for Puerto Rican singer Victor Manuelle, and Musical Legacy award for Puerto Rican singer Ivy Queen. Queen becomes the first female artist to be recognized with this award.

== Performers ==
Below is the list of the live performances of the artists and the songs they performed:

Artist(s)	Performed
Kyen? Es? and Maffio	"Sopita"
Sebastián Yatra	"Una Noche Sin Pensar"
Grupo Firme	"Ya Supérame" / "Cada Quien"
Paulina Rubio	"No Es Mi Culpa"
Gente de Zona and Maffio	"Háblame de Miami"
Ivy Queen	"12 Discipulos" / "Calentón" / "Calentura" / "Que Lloren" / "Te He Querido, Te He Llorado" / "La Vida Es Así" / "Quiero Bailar"
Alan Estrada, Isabela Castillo and Valentina	"Bidi Bidi Bom Bom" / "Mi Tierra" / "Vuelve" / "Cosas Del Amor"
Prince Royce and El Alfa	"Le Doy 20 Mil"
Fuerza Regida and Grupo Frontera	"Bebe Dame"
La Addictiva	"JGL"
Carlos Rivera and Ricardo Montaner	"Sincerándome" / "Yo No Fumo"
Gloria Trevi	"Ensayando Cómo Pedirte Perdón"
Melendi and Aymée Nuviola	"Pan Para Yolanda"
Ozuna	"Dile Que Tú Me Quieres" / "Se Preparo" / "Vaina Loca" / "Baila Baila Baila" / "Ibiza" / "Del Mar" / "Hey Mor"
Intocable, Grupo Firme and Pepe Aguilar	"Si Me Duele Que Duela" / "No Me Hablen De Amor"
Marc Anthony and Maluma	"La Fórmula"
Gilberto Santa Rosa, Tito Nieves, Jerry Rivera, Noel Schajris and Norberto Vélez	Tribute to Victor Manuelle "Tengo Ganas" / "Dile A Ella" / "He Tratado"
Arthur Hanlon, Goyo, Lupita Infante and Ivy Queen	"Gotas De Lluvia" / "Without You" / "Ya Te Olvide"

== Winners and nominees ==
The nominations were announced on January 23, 2023.

=== General ===
Artist of the Year: Karol G; Ángela Aguilar; Bad Bunny; Becky G; Camilo; Christian Nodal; Grupo Firme; J Balvin; Prince Royce; Sebastián Yatra	Album of the Year: Un Verano Sin Ti – Bad Bunny; Cumbiana II – Carlos Vives; De Adentro Pa Afuera – Camilo; Dharma – Sebastián Yatra; Esquemas – Becky G; Forajido EP1 – Christian Nodal; Legendaddy – Daddy Yankee; Me Siento a Todo Dar – Banda Los Recoditos; Motomami – Rosalía; Pa'llá Voy – Marc Anthony
Song of the Year: "Mamiii" – Becky G & Karol G; "Ahí Donde Me Ven" – Ángela Aguilar; "Cada Quien" – Grupo Firme & Maluma; "Como Lo Hice Yo" – Matisse & Carín León; "Envolver" – Anitta; "Medallo" – Blessd, Justin Quiles & Lenny Tavárez; "Moscow Mule" – Bad Bunny; "Sus Huellas" – Romeo Santos; "Tacones Rojos" – Sebastián Yatra; "Una Nota" – J Balvin & Sech	Remix of the Year: "Sal y Perrea (Remix)" – Sech, Daddy Yankee & J Balvin; "Entre Nosotros (Remix)" – Tiago PZK, Lit Killah, María Becerra & Nicki Nicole; "Envolver (Remix)" – Anitta & Justin Quiles; "Gracias (Remix)" – Pedro Capó & Farruko; "La Ducha (Remix)" – Elena Rose, María Becerra, Greeicy, Becky G & Tini
New Artist – Male: Bizarrap; Humbe; Lasso; Lit Killah; Maldy; Mario Puglia; Mora; Quevedo; Ryan Castro; Trueno	New Artist – Female: Kim Loaiza; Bad Gyal; Corina Smith; Elsa y Elmar; La Gabi; Las Villa; Lola Indigo; Tokischa; Villano Antillano; Young Miko
Crossover Collaboration of the Year: "La Fama" – Rosalía & The Weeknd; "Nostálgico" – Rvssian, Rauw Alejandro & Chris Brown; "SG" – DJ Snake, Ozuna, Megan Thee Stallion & Lisa; "Sigue" – J Balvin & Ed Sheeran; "Sin Fin" – Romeo Santos & Justin Timberlake	The Perfect Mix of the Year: "Cada Quien" – Grupo Firme & Maluma; "Cumbia del Corazón" – Los Ángeles Azules & Carlos Vives; "Ella Qué Te Dio" – Ángela Aguilar & Jesse & Joy; "El Pañuelo" – Romeo Santos & Rosalía; "Llorar y Llorar" – Mau y Ricky & Carin León; "Loquita" – Reik & Rauw Alejandro; "Mariposa Traicionera" – Maná & Alejandro Fernández; "Oh Na Na" – Camila Cabello, Myke Towers & Tainy; "Santo" – Christina Aguilera & Ozuna; "Te Espero" – Prince Royce & María Becerra
Tour of the Year: La Última Vuelta World Tour – Daddy Yankee; De Adentro Pa Afuera World Tour – Camilo; De Iztapalapa Para El Mundo Tour – Los Ángeles Azules; Dharma World Tour – Sebastián Yatra; El Último Tour Del Mundo & World's Hottest Tour – Bad Bunny; Enfiestados y Amanecidos Tour – Grupo Firme; La Última Misión World Tour – Wisin y Yandel; Motomami World Tour – Rosalía; Papi Juancho World Tour – Maluma; $Trip Love Tour – Karol G	DJ of the Year: Bizarrap; Agudelo 888; Caleb Calloway; Dímelo Flow; DJ Bash; DJ Pope; DJ Tao; DJ Tornall; Fer Palacio; Pablito Pesadilla

=== Pop ===
Male Pop Artist of the Year: Sebastián Yatra; Camilo; Carlos Rivera; Chayanne; Enrique Iglesias; Luis Fonsi; Maluma; Pedro Capó; Ricky Martin; Tommy Torres	Female Pop Artist of the Year: Shakira; Camila Cabello; Christina Aguilera; Ednita Nazario; Gloria Trevi; Kany García; Laura Pausini; Paulina Rubio; Sofía Reyes; Yuri
Pop Group or Duo of the Year: CNCO; Ha*Ash; Jesse & Joy; Maná; Matisse; Mau y Ricky; Morat; Piso 21; Reik; Sin Bandera	Pop Album of the Year: Dharma – Sebastián Yatra; 777 – Piso 21; Clichés – Jesse & Joy; De Adentro Pa Afuera – Camilo; El Amor Que Merecemos – Kany García; Isla Divina – Gloria Trevi; Ley de Gravedad – Luis Fonsi; Leyendas (Edición de Lujo) – Carlos Rivera; Play – Ricky Martin; XOXO – CNCO
Pop Song of the Year: "Tacones Rojos" – Sebastián Yatra; "Como Tú Decías" – Tommy Torres; "DPM (De P*ta Madre)" – Kany García; "Espacio en tu Corazón" – Enrique Iglesias; "Pedir Perdón" – Ednita Nazario; "Pegao" – Camilo; "Sobrio" – Maluma; "Te Amo y Punto" – Chayanne; "Volver a Casa" – Pedro Capó; "Yo Soy" – Paulina Rubio	Pop Collaboration of the Year: "Te Felicito" – Shakira & Rauw Alejandro; "A Veces Bien Y A Veces Mal" – Ricky Martin & Reik; "Contigo" – Sebastián Yatra & Pablo Alborán; "Estar Enamorado" – Carlos Rivera & Raphael; "Índigo" – Camilo & Evaluna Montaner; "Intenciones" – Mario Puglia & Renee; "Muero" – Kany García & Alejandro Sanz; "Si Pudiera" – Vanesa Martín & Jesse & Joy; "Vacaciones" – Luis Fonsi & Manuel Turizo; "Wow BB" – Natti Natasha, El Alfa & Chimbala
Pop/Ballad Song of the Year: "Contigo" – Sebastián Yatra & Pablo Alborán; "A Veces Bien Y A Veces Mal" – Ricky Martin & Reik; "Ahora Sé" – Sin Bandera; "Caja" – Laura Pausini; "El Día Que Me Quieras" – Ricardo Montaner; "Ensayando Cómo Pedirte Perdón" – Gloria Trevi; "Estar Enamorado" – Carlos Rivera & Raphael; "Muero" – Kany García & Alejandro Sanz; "Nuestra Balada" – Luis Fonsi; "Respirar" – Jesse & Joy

=== Urban ===
Male Urban Artist of the Year: Daddy Yankee; Bad Bunny; Don Omar; Farruko; J Balvin; Jhayco; Nicky Jam; Ozuna; Rauw Alejandro; Wisin	Female Urban Artist of the Year: Karol G; Anitta; Becky G; Elena Rose; Farina; María Becerra; Natti Natasha; Nicki Nicole; Rosalía; Tokischa
Urban Album of the Year: Un Verano Sin Ti – Bad Bunny; Esquemas – Becky G; La Última Misión – Wisin y Yandel; Las Leyendas Nunca Mueren – Anuel AA; Legendaddy – Daddy Yankee; Lyke Mike – Myke Towers; Motomami – Rosalía; Sauce Boyz 2 – Eladio Carrión; The Love & Sex Tape – Maluma; Versions of Me – Anitta	Urban Song of the Year: "Provenza" – Karol G; "Deprimida" – Ozuna; "Desesperados" – Rauw Alejandro & Chencho Corleone; "Dos Tragos" – Jay Wheeler; "Envolver" – Anitta; "Moscow Mule" – Bad Bunny; "Nivel de Perreo" – J Balvin & Ryan Castro; "Ojos Rojos" – Nicky Jam; "Remix" – Daddy Yankee; "Sensual Bebé" – Jhayco
Urban Collaboration of the Year: "Me Porto Bonito" – Bad Bunny & Chencho Corleone; "Bendecido" – El Alfa & Farina; "Emojis de Corazones" – Wisin, Jhayco, Ozuna & Los Legendarios; "Friki" – Feid & Karol G; "Lo Siento BB:/" – Tainy, Bad Bunny & Julieta Venegas; "Mayor Que Usted" – Natti Natasha, Daddy Yankee & Wisin y Yandel; "Medallo" – Blessd, Justin Quiles & Lenny Tavárez; "Nos Comemos" – Tiago PZK & Ozuna; "Problemón" – Álvaro Díaz & Rauw Alejandro; "Una Nota" – J Balvin & Sech	Urban/Pop Song of the Year: "Te Felicito" – Shakira & Rauw Alejandro; "Buenos Días" – Wisin, Camilo & Los Legendarios; "Envolver" – Anitta; "Experimento" – Myke Towers; "Fiesta" – Farina & Ryan Castro; "La Funka" – Ozuna; "Mama Tetema" – Maluma featuring Rayvanny; "Mamiii" – Becky G & Karol G; "Toa La Noche" – CNCO; "TV" – Sebastián Yatra
Urban Dance/Pop Song of the Year: "Quevedo: Bzrp Music Sessions, Vol. 52" – Bizarrap & Quevedo; "Baila Así" – Play-N-Skillz, Thalía, Becky G & Chiquis; "Bailé Con Mi Ex" – Becky G; "Bendecido" – El Alfa & Farina; "Berlín" – Zion & Lennox & María Becerra; "Despechá" – Rosalía; "El Incomprendido" – Farruko, Víctor Cárdenas & DJ Adoni; "El Teke Teke" – Carlos Vives, Black Eyed Peas & Play-N-Skillz; "Hot" – Daddy Yankee & Pitbull; "Mujeriego" – Ryan Castro

=== Tropical ===
Tropical Artist of the Year: Romeo Santos; Carlos Vives; Gente de Zona; Gilberto Santa Rosa; Juan Luis Guerra; Luis Figueroa; Marc Anthony; Olga Tañón; Prince Royce; Víctor Manuelle	Tropical Album of the Year: Pa'llá Voy – Marc Anthony; Cumbiana II – Carlos Vives; De Menor a Mayor – Gente de Zona; De Trulla Con el Combo – El Gran Combo de Puerto Rico; Debut Y Segunda Tanda, Vol. 1 – Gilberto Santa Rosa; Lado A Lado B – Víctor Manuelle; Luis Figueroa – Luis Figueroa; Mi Muchachita – Elvis Martínez; Resistirá – Milly Quezada; Tañón Pal' Combo Es Lo Que Hay – Olga Tañón
Tropical Song of the Year: "Sus Huellas" – Romeo Santos; "La Cantante (Salsa)" – Yahaira Plasencia featuring Ator Untela; "Lao' a Lao'" – Prince Royce; "Mala" – Marc Anthony; "Todavía Te Espero" – Luis Figueroa	Tropical Collaboration of the Year: "Te Espero" – Prince Royce & María Becerra; "Baloncito Viejo" – Carlos Vives & Camilo; "El Negrito" – Gente de Zona & Carlos Vives; "Señor Juez" – Ozuna & Antony Santos; "Si Yo Estoy Loco" – SanLuis & Fonseca; "Vamo' a Ver Si el Gas Pela" – Víctor Manuelle, Miky Woodz & Marvin Santiago

=== Regional Mexican ===
Male Regional Mexican Artist of the Year: Christian Nodal; Adriel Favela; Alfredo Olivas; Carín León; Edén Muñoz; El Fantasma; Gerardo Ortiz; Joss Favela; Lenin Ramírez; Pepe Aguilar	Female Regional Mexican Artist of the Year: Ángela Aguilar; Aida Cuevas; Ana Bárbara; Carolina Ross; Chiquis; Flor de Toloache; Las Marías; Lupita Infante; Majo Aguilar; Yuridia
Regional Mexican Group or Duo of the Year: Grupo Firme; Banda Los Recoditos; Banda Los Sebastianes; Banda MS de Sergio Lizárraga; Edwin Luna y La Trakalosa de Monterrey; La Adictiva; La Arrolladora Banda El Limón de René Camacho; La Fiera de Ojinaga; Los Ángeles Azules; Yahritza y Su Esencia	Regional Mexican New Artist of the Year: Carín León; Aldo Trujillo; DannyLux; Gera MX; Ivan Cornejo; Junior H; Los Del Limit; Luis R Conriquez; Uziel Payan; Yahritza y Su Esencia
Regional Mexican Album of the Year: Enfiestados y Amanecidos – Grupo Firme; A la Medida – Pepe Aguilar; Abeja Reina – Chiquis; Aclarando la Mente – Joss Favela; Esta Vida Es Muy Bonita – Banda El Recodo de Cruz Lizárraga; Forajido EP1 – Christian Nodal; Jalas O No Jalas (Edición Deluxe) – La Fiera de Ojinaga; La Reunión – Los Tigres del Norte; ‘Me Siento a Todo Dar – Banda Los Recoditos; Prefiero Estar Contigo – La Arrolladora Banda El Limón de René Camacho	Regional Mexican Song of the Year: "Ya Supérame (En Vivo)" – Grupo Firme; "Ahí Donde Me Ven" – Ángela Aguilar; "Cómo Te Olvido" – La Arrolladora Banda El Limón de René Camacho; "Esta Vida Es Muy Bonita" – Banda El Recodo de Cruz Lizárraga; "Mi Problema" – Chiquis; "No Paras de Hacerme Feliz" – La Fiera de Ojinaga; "Ojos Cerrados" – Banda MS de Sergio Lizárraga & Carin León; "Otra Noche" – Los Ángeles Azules & Nicki Nicole; "Ya No Somos Ni Seremos" – Christian Nodal; "Ya Solo Eres Mi Ex" – La Addictiva
Regional Mexican Collaboration of the Year: "En Tu Perra Vida" – Grupo Firme & Lenin Ramírez; "Amores Van y Vienen" – La Nueva Estrategia & La Maquinaria Norteña; "Con un Botecito a Pecho" – Adriel Favela & Carin León; "La Sinvergüenza" – Christian Nodal & Banda MS de Sergio Lizárraga; "Tus Desprecios" – Pepe Aguilar & El Fantasma	Norteño Song of the Year: "Chale" – Edén Muñoz; "Gato de Madrugada" – Joss Favela; "Míranos Ahora" – Calibre 50; "No" – Alfredo Olivas; "No Paras de Hacerme Feliz" – La Fiera De Ojinaga; "Si Me Duele Que Duela" – Intocable
Banda Song of the Year: "Cada Quien" – Grupo Firme & Maluma; "Cómo Te Olvido" – La Arrolladora Banda El Limón de René Camacho; "Esta Vida Es Muy Bonita" – Banda El Recodo de Cruz Lizárraga; "Quiero Amanecer Con Alguien" – Chiquis; "Ya Solo Eres Mi Ex" – La Addictiva	Mariachi/Ranchera Song of the Year: "Ya No Somos Ni Seremos" – Christian Nodal; "Ahí Donde Me Ven" – Ángela Aguilar; "Amor Ilegal" – Majo Aguilar; "Con un Botecito a Pecho" – Adriel Favela & Carin León; "Me Hace Tanto Bien" – Yuridia & Edén Muñoz; "Triste" – Chayín Rubio
Sierrera Song of the Year: "Soy el Único" – Yahritza y Su Esencia; "Como Antes" – Nathan Galante; "Descansando" – Fuerza Regida; "Híbrido" – Virlán García; "Un Día Menos" – Grupo Los de Chiwas

=== Special Merit Awards ===
- Lifetime Achievement Award – Victor Manuelle
- Musical Legacy Award – Ivy Queen
- Excellence Award - Intocable
