= List of Billboard Regional Mexican Albums number ones of 2024 =

The Regional Mexican Albums, published in Billboard magazine, is a record chart that features Latin music sales information for regional styles of Mexican music. This data are compiled by Nielsen SoundScan from a sample that includes music stores, music departments at department stores, verifiable sales from concert venues and track equivalent album units and streaming equivalent album units in the United States.

== Chart history ==
Issue date	Album	Artist(s)	Ref.
January 6	Génesis	Peso Pluma	
January 13	Génesis	Peso Pluma	
January 20	Génesis	Peso Pluma	
January 27	Génesis	Peso Pluma	
February 3	Génesis	Peso Pluma	
February 10	Génesis	Peso Pluma	
February 17	Génesis	Peso Pluma	
February 24	Génesis	Peso Pluma	
March 2	Génesis	Peso Pluma	
March 9	Génesis	Peso Pluma	
March 16	Génesis	Peso Pluma	
March 23	Génesis	Peso Pluma	
March 30	Génesis	Peso Pluma	
April 6	Génesis	Peso Pluma	
April 13	Génesis	Peso Pluma	
April 20	Génesis	Peso Pluma	
April 27	Pa Las Baby's y Belikeada	Fuerza Regida	
May 4	Pa Las Baby's y Belikeada	Fuerza Regida	
May 11	Pa Las Baby's y Belikeada	Fuerza Regida	
May 18	Génesis	Peso Pluma	
May 25	Génesis	Peso Pluma	
June 1	Génesis	Peso Pluma	
June 8	Génesis	Peso Pluma	
June 15	Génesis	Peso Pluma	
June 22	Génesis	Peso Pluma	
June 29	Génesis	Peso Pluma	
July 6	Éxodo	Peso Pluma	
July 13	Éxodo	Peso Pluma	
July 20	Éxodo	Peso Pluma	
July 27	Éxodo	Peso Pluma	
August 3	Mirada	Iván Cornejo	
August 10	Éxodo	Peso Pluma	
August 17	Éxodo	Peso Pluma	
August 24	Éxodo	Peso Pluma	
August 31	Éxodo	Peso Pluma	
September 7	Éxodo	Peso Pluma	
September 14	Éxodo	Peso Pluma	
September 21	Éxodo	Peso Pluma	
September 28	Éxodo	Peso Pluma	
October 5	Incómodo	Tito Double P	
October 12	Incómodo	Tito Double P	
October 19	Incómodo	Tito Double P	
October 26	Incómodo	Tito Double P	
November 2	Incómodo	Tito Double P	
November 9	Incómodo	Tito Double P	
November 16	Incómodo	Tito Double P	
November 23	Incómodo	Tito Double P	
November 30	Incómodo	Tito Double P	
December 7	Incómodo	Tito Double P	
December 14	Incómodo	Tito Double P	
December 21	Incómodo	Tito Double P	
December 28	Incómodo	Tito Double P	
