= List of Billboard Tropical Airplay number ones of 2022 =

The Billboard Tropical Airplay chart is a subchart of the Latin Airplay that ranks the best-performing tropical songs played on Latin radio stations in the United States.

== Chart history ==
Issue date	Song	Artist	Ref
January 1	"Se Menea"	Don Omar and Nio Garcia	
January 8	"Se Menea"	Don Omar and Nio Garcia	
January 15	"Se Menea"	Don Omar and Nio Garcia	
January 22	"Se Menea"	Don Omar and Nio Garcia	
January 29	"Se Menea"	Don Omar and Nio Garcia	
February 5	"Se Menea"	Don Omar and Nio Garcia	
February 12	"Se Menea"	Don Omar and Nio Garcia	
February 19	"Se Menea"	Don Omar and Nio Garcia	
February 26	"Sus Huellas"	Romeo Santos	
March 5	"Sus Huellas"	Romeo Santos	
March 12	"Mala"	Marc Anthony	
March 19	"Sus Huellas"	Romeo Santos	
March 26	"Sus Huellas"	Romeo Santos	
April 2	"Sus Huellas"	Romeo Santos	
April 9	"Sus Huellas"	Romeo Santos	
April 16	"Sus Huellas"	Romeo Santos	
April 23	"Sus Huellas"	Romeo Santos	
April 30	"Sus Huellas"	Romeo Santos	
May 7	"Sus Huellas"	Romeo Santos	
May 14	"La Fama"	Rosalía featuring The Weeknd	
May 21	"La Fama"	Rosalía featuring The Weeknd	
May 28	"Te Espero"	Prince Royce featuring María Becerra	
June 4	"Te Espero"	Prince Royce featuring María Becerra	
June 11	"Baloncito Viejo"	Carlos Vives and Camilo	
June 18	"Baloncito Viejo"	Carlos Vives and Camilo	
June 25	"Te Espero"	Prince Royce featuring María Becerra	
July 2	"Te Espero"	Prince Royce featuring María Becerra	
July 9	"Soy Yo"	Don Omar, Wisin and Gente de Zona	
July 16	"Soy Yo"	Don Omar, Wisin and Gente de Zona	
July 23	"Soy Yo"	Don Omar, Wisin and Gente de Zona	
July 30	"Soy Yo"	Don Omar, Wisin and Gente de Zona	
August 6	"La Bachata"	Manuel Turizo	
August 13	"Pegao"	Camilo	
August 20	"La Bachata"	Manuel Turizo	
August 27	"La Bachata"	Manuel Turizo	
September 3	"La Bachata"	Manuel Turizo	
September 10	"La Bachata"	Manuel Turizo	
September 17	"Sin Fin"	Romeo Santos and Justin Timberlake	
September 24	"Sin Fin"	Romeo Santos and Justin Timberlake	
October 1	"Despechá"	Rosalía	
October 8	"Despechá"	Rosalía	
October 15	"Despechá"	Rosalía	
October 22	"Despechá"	Rosalía	
October 29	"La Bachata"	Manuel Turizo	
November 5	"Sin Fin"	Romeo Santos and Justin Timberlake	
November 12	"La Bachata"	Manuel Turizo	
November 19	"La Bachata"	Manuel Turizo	
November 26	"La Bachata"	Manuel Turizo	
December 3	"Monotonía"	Shakira and Ozuna	
December 10	"Monotonía"	Shakira and Ozuna	
December 17	"Monotonía"	Shakira and Ozuna	
December 24	"Monotonía"	Shakira and Ozuna	
December 31	"Monotonía"	Shakira and Ozuna	
