= Monkey Black =

Dominican rapper (1986–2014)

- Born: Leonardo Michael Flores Ozuna; 26 July 1986; Los Mina, Dominican Republic
- Died: 30 April 2014 (aged 27) Sant Adrià de Besòs, Catalonia, Spain
- Genres: Hip hop; dembow; urban; rap
- Occupations: Rapper; singer
- Instrument: Vocals
- Years active: 2006–2014
- Labels: Fashion Records; Top Dollar Entertainment; Stars Mansion Records; Harley Boys Entertainment

External image
- Image of Monkey Black hosted on lavanguardia.com

Leonardo Michael Flores Ozuna (Los Mina; 26 July 1986 – Sant Adrià de Besòs, Catalonia; 30 April 2014), known by his stage name Monkey Black, was a Dominican rapper.

== Biography ==
Monkey Black was born in Los Mina on 26 July 1986. From a very young age, he showed a strong interest in music and by the age of 10 he had recorded his first material with El Sujeto. He later emigrated to Puerto Rico, where he worked various jobs.

When he returned to the Dominican Republic, he became an urban artist. In 2006, with the support of Lápiz Conciente, he gained public recognition through the collaboration "Tienen miedo" alongside him and Big K. He rose from a local rapper to an international artist with the hit "El Sol y La Playa", produced by music producer Nico Clinico.

Years later, he moved to Spain to expand his international career, four years later he was murdered in Barcelona.

== Death ==
He died on Wednesday, 30 April 2014, after being fatally stabbed in Sant Adrià de Besòs (Barcelona, Spain), where he had lived for four years after getting married.

His body was repatriated to the Dominican Republic on 17 May; the funeral was scheduled for the same day and burial took place on 19 May.

== Discography ==
- Ultra Mega Universal (Album) (Semi-Unreleased)

=== Singles ===
- El Dembow del Mono
- El Trampolín
- De lo' mío (2011)
- Capea el Dough Personal (2014)
- El sol y la playa (2009)
- Locotrón (2007)
- Palomo En Lata
- Ojalá y me muera
- Dime rápido
- Tu va' querer una foto conmigo
- Activo
- Punto de vista (2013)
- Ratacutupla
- Ay Dios
- Algo de mi (2009)
- Entró con la U (2009)
- Va tene' que vola' (2010)
- No toy' pa' boda
