= Culpable (song) =

2022 song by Romeo Santos

Song by Romeo Santos with Lápiz Conciente

from the album Formula, Vol. 3
- Released: September 1, 2022 (album release)
- Genre: Hip hop; contemporary R&B
- Length: 2:57
- Label: Sony Latin
- Songwriter: Anthony "Romeo" Santos
- Producers: Anthony "Romeo" Santos; Mate Traxx

"Culpable" (English: "Guilty") is a song by American singer Romeo Santos and Dominican rapper Lápiz Conciente. It is the eighteenth track of Santos' fifth studio album Formula, Vol. 3 (2022). The song uses the instrumentals from Luniz's I Got 5 On It. A teaser trailer for the music video was released on September 2, 2022, but the music video has not been released yet.

== Charts ==
Chart performance for "Culpable"
Chart (2022)	Peak position
Dominican Republic General (Monitor Latino)	5

== Certifications ==
Certifications for "Culpable"
Region	Certification	Certified units/sales
United States (RIAA)	Gold (Latin)	30,000^{‡}
^{‡} Sales+streaming figures based on certification alone.
