= Obsessed (EP) =

EP by Yahritza y su Esencia
- Released: April 22, 2022 (Standard edition); July 13, 2022 (Deluxe edition)
- Genre: Urban sierreño
- Length: 15:41 (Standard edition); 22:08 (Deluxe edition)
- Language: Spanish
- Label: Lumbre Music; Sony Music Latin (Deluxe edition)
- Producer: Ramón Ruiz; Armando Martínez; Jairo Martínez

Yahritza y su Esencia chronology
Obsessed (2022)	Obsessed Pt. 2 (2023)

Singles from Obsessed
- 1. "Soy el Único" Released: March 25, 2022; 2. "Esta Noche" Released: April 9, 2022

Obsessed is the debut extended play by American regional Mexican trio Yahritza y su Esencia, released on April 22, 2022, through Lumbre Music. It was produced by Ramón Ruiz plus members of the trio: Armando Martínez and Jairo Martínez. A deluxe edition of the EP was released on July 13, 2022.

The EP was supported by two singles: the breakout hit "Soy el Único" and "Esta Noche". It peaked at numbers 173 and 7 at the Billboard 200 and Top Latin Albums charts, respectively, while at the Regional Mexican Albums, it reached the top position. In October 2022, the EP was certified platinum in the United States.

At the 23rd Annual Latin Grammy Awards, the EP was nominated for Best Norteño Album while the trio was nominated for Best New Artist. The deluxe version was nominated for Favorite Regional Mexican Album at the Latin American Music Awards of 2023.

== Background ==
Originating for Yakima, Washington, and of Mexican descent, Yahritza y su Esencia consists of siblings: Yahritza Martínez (vocals and acoustic guitar), Armando "Mando" Martínez (twelve-string guitar), and Jairo Martínez (acoustic bass). Yahritza began sharing videos singing and playing the guitar at age 14. At that age, she wrote the song "Soy el Único", which would end up being their breakout hit as a trio. The band gained prominence in November 2021 after their cover of "Está Dañada" by Iván Cornejo went viral on TikTok, which led them to be signed to Lumbre Music after meeting with Ramón Ruiz and Alex Guerra, the founders of the label.

In February 2022, a fragment of "Soy el Único" went viral on TikTok, leading to the song being released as an official single the following month. A break-up song, Yahritza found inspiration for the lyrics in the comments that people left in their videos about their relationships. "Soy el Único" achieved great commercial success entering various charts in both the United States and Mexico. It was followed by "Esta Noche" as their second single.

On April 22, 2022, the trio finally released their first full-length project, the five-song EP Obsessed, with a deluxe version being released later in July. The EP consists of three songs written by Yahritza ("Soy el Único", "Enamorado" and "Déjalo Ir"), plus two covers, "Siendo Sincero" by Los del Limit and "Esta Noche" by Nivel Codiciado and José Mejía. The success of the project and its singles led the band to be co-signed with Sony Music Latin, as a partnership between the label and Lumbre Music.

== Singles ==
Their debut single "Soy el Único" was released as the first single for the EP on March 25, 2022. On April 9, 2022, the song peaked at numbers 20 and 29 at the Billboard Hot 100 and Billboard Global 200 charts, respectively. It also topped the Hot Latin Songs chart. The following week, on April 16, the song peaked at number 12 at the Mexico Songs chart. Upon its release as an official single, the song topped the ranking on YouTube Music in the United States and reached the fifth position in Mexico. On April 21, the song was certified platinum in the United States, later achieving multi-platinum status on October 27.

On April 9, "Esta Noche" was released as the second single. It peaked at number 16 at the Hot Latin Songs chart. The track "Déjalo Ir" also entered said chart, peaking at number 41.

== Commercial performance ==
On the issue dated April 28, 2022, the EP debuted at number 7 at the Top Latin Albums chart, while at the Billboard 200 chart, it entered at number 173. Also, the EP topped the Regional Mexican Albums with 8,000 equivalent album units earned in the United States. On October 27, 2022, the EP was certified platinum in the United States with 60,000 equivalent units earned in the country.

== Track listing ==
Obsessed track listing
No.	Title	Writer(s)	Producer(s)	Length
1.	"Esta Noche"	Bryan Rodríguez Matías	Ramón Ruiz	3:09
2.	"Enamorado"	Yahritza Martínez	Ruiz	2:33
3.	"Soy el Único"	Yahritza Martínez	Ruiz	3:33
4.	"Siendo Sincero"	Ruben Roman Leyva	Ruiz	3:29
5.	"Déjalo Ir"	Yahritza Martínez	Ruiz	2:57
Total length:				15:41

Obsessed (Deluxe) track listing
No.	Title	Writer(s)	Producer(s)	Length
6.	"Nadie Sabe"	Yahritza Martínez; Armando Martínez	Ruiz; Armando Martínez; Jairo Martínez	2:32
7.	"Estás en Mi Pasado"	Ivan Cornejo	Ruiz; Armando Martínez; Jairo Martínez	3:55
Total length:				22:08

== Charts ==
=== Weekly charts ===
Chart performance for Obsessed
Chart (2022)	Peak position
US Billboard 200	173
US Top Latin Albums (Billboard)	7
US Regional Mexican Albums (Billboard)	1

=== Year-end charts ===
Year-end chart performance for Obsessed
Chart (2022)	Position
US Top Latin Albums (Billboard)	49

== Certifications ==
Certifications for Obsessed
Region	Certification	Certified units/sales
United States (RIAA)	Platinum (Latin)	60,000^{‡}
^{‡} Sales+streaming figures based on certification alone.
