= Suegra =

2023 single by Romeo Santos

Single by Romeo Santos

from the album Formula, Vol. 3
- Language: Spanish
- Released: March 3, 2023
- Genre: Bachata
- Length: 3:44
- Label: Sony Latin
- Songwriter: Anthony "Romeo" Santos
- Producers: Romeo Santos; Mate Traxx

Romeo Santos singles chronology
"X Si Volvemos" (2023)	"Suegra" (2023)	"Boomerang" (2023)

Music video
- "Suegra" on YouTube

"Suegra" (English: "Mother-in-law") is a song by American singer Romeo Santos. It is the eighth single for Santos' fifth studio album Formula, Vol. 3 (2022). The music video was released on March 3, 2023. It features Santos paying homage to the late Dominican comedian Luisito Martí, who was known for his iconic portrayal of Balbuena, alongside first actress Cecilia García as the titular mother-in-law, as well as the special participation of urban singer Bulin 47 and Leli Hernández as Santos' girlfriend.

== Controversy ==
On February 27, 2023, at the same time that Santos teased the video on his Instagram account to celebrate the Independence Day, politician and lawyer Víctor Pavón submitted an instance before the National Commission of Public Entertainment and Radiophony, demanding that the song be banned from the local radio stations, strongly arguing that its lyrics promote violence against women and violate the Republic's Constitution in various articles and Dominican laws. On March 3, Pavón's request was granted and the Commission officially banned the song from the stations, with the politician congratulating the entity for their diligence. Santos responded by releasing the video, which was shot in September 2022, on his YouTube channel, stating that he did not arrange for it to be released around this time, but the song's ban forced him to push his plans forward.

On December 31, 2024, the Commission issued a warning against Santos, who performed the song along with his bandmates of Aventura during their third show on December 29 from their tour Cerrando Ciclos, where he harshly criticized the institution in frustration over the song's unfair ban.

Interim president Giovanny Cruz responded to Santos' defiance with the following statement:

Public note to Mr. Romeo Santos and Mr. Saymon Diaz. No one, not even you, is above the law and rules. The current National Commission of Public Entertainment and Radiophony is analizing their case (with insults included) and the defiance made by Santos to a state institution at an official facility during his Cerrando Ciclos concert.

— Giovanny Cruz

On January 2, 2025, Saymon Diaz, the CEO of Santo Domingo Concerts, contacted Cruz and the Minister of Culture Milagros Germán to request that the song's ban be lifted in order for Santos to perform it on his tour's last show without any problem, stating that the Commission does not have the power to cancel the event and its only job is to ensure that the regulations be respected. However, on January 3, the request was denied and Cruz reiterated the Commission's concerns about the content on the song's lyrics, emphasizing that the verses about poisoning a woman and throwing her off a cliff strongly encourage violence and damage to public morals. Cruz also said that the event would not be canceled, but he still expected Santos to give a public apology at his last show for performing the song.

== Charts ==
Chart performance for "Suegra"
Chart (2022–23)	Peak position
Dominican Republic Bachata (Monitor Latino)	4
US Tropical Airplay (Billboard)	17

== Certifications ==
Certifications for "Suegra"
Region	Certification	Certified units/sales
United States (RIAA)	Platinum (Latin)	60,000^{‡}
^{‡} Sales+streaming figures based on certification alone.
