= Solo Conmigo =

2023 single by Romeo Santos

Single by Romeo Santos

from the album Formula, Vol. 3
- Released: January 17, 2023
- Genre: Bachata
- Length: 4:14
- Label: Sony Latin
- Songwriter: Anthony "Romeo" Santos
- Producers: Romeo Santos; Mate Traxx

Romeo Santos singles chronology
"Siri" (2022)	"Solo Conmigo" (2023)	"X Si Volvemos" (2023)

Music video
- "Solo Conmigo" on YouTube

"Solo Conmigo" (English: "Only With Me") is a song by American singer Romeo Santos. It is the seventh single for Santos' fifth studio album Formula, Vol. 3 (2022). The music video was released on January 17, 2023. It features Santos' longtime girlfriend as she is seen pregnant in the video as they both announced that they are expecting another child. This means that Santos is expecting his fourth child.

== Charts ==
Chart performance for "Solo Conmigo"
Chart (2022–23)	Peak position
Panama (PRODUCE)	11
Dominican Republic Bachata (Monitor Latino)	7
US Hot Latin Songs (Billboard)	40
US Latin Airplay (Billboard)	11
US Tropical Airplay (Billboard)	3

== Certifications ==
Certifications for "Solo Conmigo"
Region	Certification	Certified units/sales
Mexico (AMPROFON)	Platinum	140,000^{‡}
United States (RIAA)	4× Platinum (Latin)	240,000^{‡}
^{‡} Sales+streaming figures based on certification alone.
