= Yahritza y su Esencia =

American regional music and ranchera band

Yahritza y Su Esencia
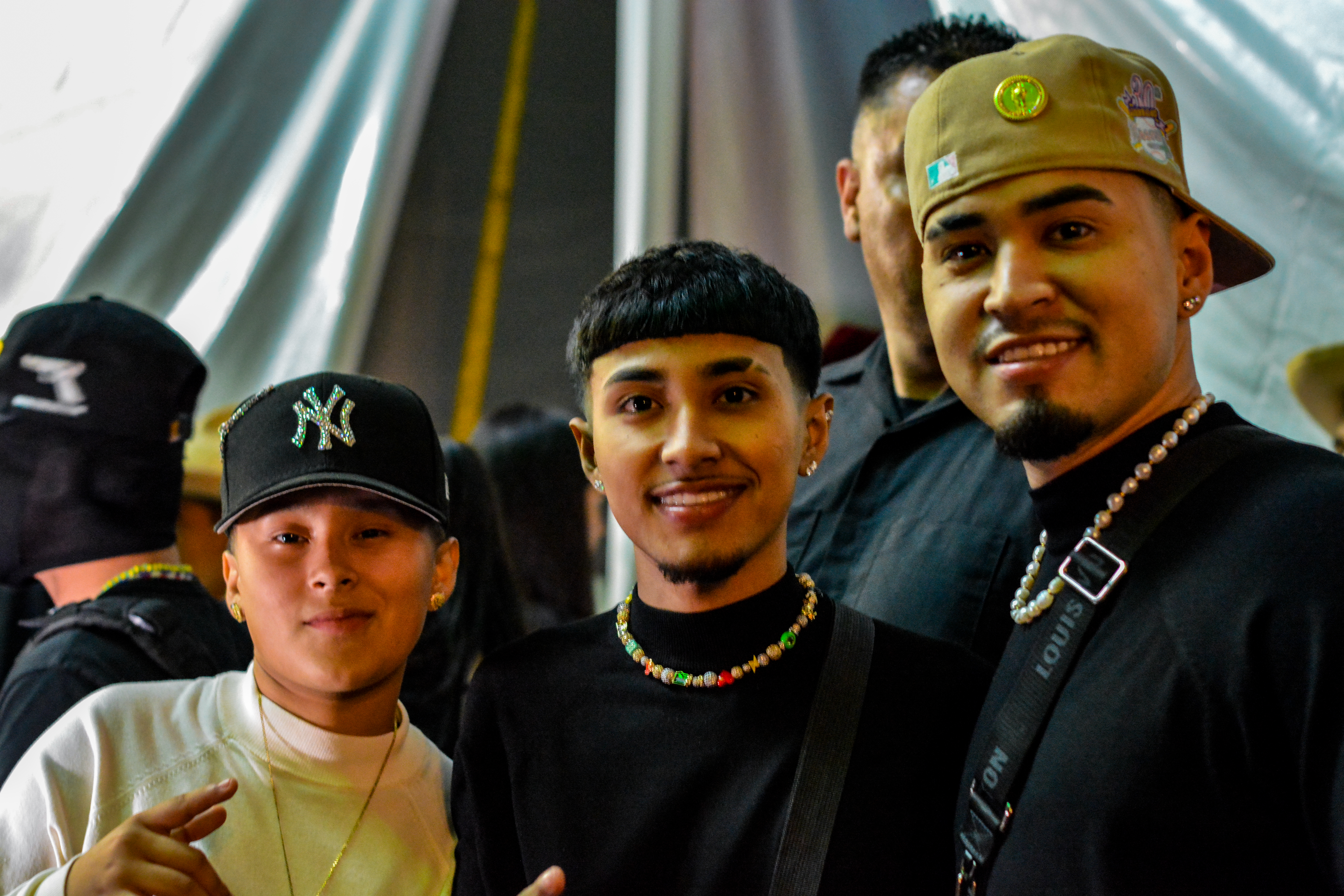
- Yahritza, Jairo and Mando Martinez (left to right) in Mexico City.

Background information
- Origin: Yakima Valley, Washington, US
- Genres: Regional Mexican; urban sierreño
- Years active: 2022–present
- Labels: Lumbre Music; Columbia
- Members: Yahritza Martínez; Armando "Mando" Martínez; Jairo Martínez

Yahritza y su Esencia (Spanish for "Yahritza and her Essence") is an American trio from Washington state's Yakima Valley who specialize in regional Mexican music; specifically the urban sierreño subgenre. The band are three siblings: Yahritza Martínez (vocals and acoustic guitar), Armando "Mando" Martínez (twelve-string guitar), and Jairo Martínez (acoustic bass).

For the week of April 9, 2022, their song "Soy el Único" appeared on the Billboard Global 200. Yahritza wrote the song when she was fourteen. At the 23rd Annual Latin Grammy Awards, the trio was nominated for Best New Artist as well as for Best Norteño Album for Obsessed, their debut album.

== Controversy ==
The Martinez siblings are of Mexican descent, with parents from Michoacán. Following an interview in which they expressed dislike for Mexico City and its cuisine, the group faced criticism on social media. In response to the backlash, they issued an apology, stating that it was never their intention to offend anyone.

== Discography ==
=== Extended plays ===
Title	Details	Peak chart positions		Certifications
Title	Details	US	US Latin	Certifications
Obsessed	Released: April 22, 2022; Format: Digital download, streaming; Label: Lumbre Music	173	7	RIAA: Platinum (Latin)
Obsessed Pt. 2	Released: September 8, 2023; Format: Digital download, streaming; Label: Lumbre Music	—	—	
Memorias	Released: September 6, 2024; Format: Digital download, streaming; Label: Lumbre Music	—	—	

=== Singles ===
==== As lead artist ====
Title	Year	Peak chart positions										Certifications	Album
Title	Year	US	US Latin	ARG	CAN	IRE	MEX	SPA	SWI	UK	WW	Certifications	Album
"Soy el Único"	2022	20	1	—	—	—	12	—	—	—	29	RIAA: Diamond (Latin)	Obsessed
"Esta Noche"	2022	—	16	—	—	—	—	—	—	—	—		Obsessed
"Inseparables" (with Iván Cornejo)	2022	— (Note: "Inseparables" did not enter the Billboard Hot 100, but peaked at number five on the Bubbling Under Hot 100 Singles chart.)	17	—	—	—	—	—	—	—	—		Obsessed Pt. 2
"Cambiaste"	2023	—	—	—	—	—	—	—	—	—	—		Obsessed Pt. 2
"Frágil" (with Grupo Frontera)	2023	69	11	28	—	—	7	—	—	—	37	RIAA: Platinum; AMPROFON: 3× Platinum+Gold	Obsessed Pt. 2
"Dos Extraños"	2023	—	—	—	—	—	—	—	—	—	—		Obsessed Pt. 2
"Solo Que Lo Dudes" (with Banda MS)	2023	—	—	—	—	—	—	—	—	—	—		Non-album singles
"Nos Equivocamos" (featuring Luis Alfonso Partida El Yaki)	2023	—	—	—	—	—	—	—	—	—	—		Non-album singles
"Te Fui a Seguir" (with Milo J)	2023	—	—	82	—	—	—	—	—	—	—		1 1 1
"QPTP" (with Michelle Maciel)	2024	—	—	—	—	—	—	—	—	—	—		Trastornado
"Y Qué Tal Si Te Escapas Del Cielo"	2024	—	—	—	—	—	—	—	—	—	—		Non-album single
"La Perla" (with Rosalía)	2025	82	3	9	88	43	15	1	7	53	12	PROMUSICAE: Gold	Lux
"—" denotes a recording that did not chart.

==== Promotional singles ====
Title	Year	Album
"No Se Puede Decir Adiós"	2023	Obsessed Pt. 2
"Nuestra Canción"	2023	Obsessed Pt. 2
"Tu Cárcel"	2024	Non-album promotional singles
"Tu Orgullo"	2024	Non-album promotional singles
"Nivel Dios" (with Michelle Maciel)	2024	Non-album promotional singles
"No Es Cierto"	2024	Non-album promotional singles
"Qué Puedo Perder"	2025	Non-album promotional singles

=== Other charted songs ===
Title	Year	Peak chart position	Album
Title	Year	US Latin	Album
"Dejalo Ir"	2022	41	Obsessed

=== Guest appearances ===
Title	Year	Other artist(s)	Album
"Fuentes de Ortiz"	2022	—	—
"Amarga Navidad"	2022	—	—
"Qué Agonía (Remix)"	2023	Yuridia, Ángela Aguilar	—
"Las Flores"	2023	Grupo Frontera	El Comienzo
"Patras"	2023	Becky G	Esquinas
"Sinvergüenza"	2025	Christian Lara	Non-album songs
"Besos Robados"	2025	Ana Bárbara	Non-album songs

== Awards and nominations ==
Award	Year	Category	Nominated work	Result	Ref.
Billboard Latin Music Awards	2023	Duo/Group Hot Latin Songs Artist of the Year	Yahritza y Su Esencia	Nominated	
Latin Grammy Awards	2022	Best New Artist	Yahritza y Su Esencia	Nominated	
Latin Grammy Awards	2022	Best Norteño Album	Obsessed	Nominated	
Latin Grammy Awards	2026	Record of the Year	"La Perla"	Pending	
Latin Grammy Awards	2026	Best Contemporary Mexican Music Album	Metamorfosis	Nominated	
Latin American Music Awards	2023	New Artist of the Year	Yahritza y Su Esencia	Nominated	
Latin American Music Awards	2023	Favorite Regional Mexican Duo or Group	Yahritza y Su Esencia	Nominated	
Latin American Music Awards	2023	Favorite Regional Mexican Album	Obsessed Deluxe	Nominated	
Premio Lo Nuestro	2023	Regional Mexican Group or Duo of the Year	Yahritza y Su Esencia	Nominated	
Premio Lo Nuestro	2023	Regional Mexican New Artist of the Year	Yahritza y Su Esencia	Nominated	
Premio Lo Nuestro	2023	Sierrera Song of the Year	"Soy el único"	Won	
Rolling Stone en Español Awards	2023	Breakout Star of the Year	Yahritza y Su Esencia	Nominated	
