= Siri (Romeo Santos song) =

2022 single by Romeo Santos

Single by Romeo Santos and Chris Lebron

from the album Formula, Vol. 3
- Released: November 22, 2022
- Recorded: 2022
- Genre: Latin
- Length: 2:44
- Label: Sony Latin
- Songwriter: Anthony "Romeo" Santos
- Producers: Anthony "Romeo" Santos; Mate Traxx

Romeo Santos singles chronology
"Me Extraño" (2022)	"Siri" (2022)	"Solo Conmigo" (2023)

Chris Lebron singles chronology
"Desde Mis Ojos (Remix)" (2022)	"Siri" (2022)	"Loco" (2022)

Music video
- "Siri" on YouTube

"Siri" (stylized as SIRI) is a song by American singer Romeo Santos and Dominican singer Chris Lebron. It is the sixth single for Santos' fifth studio album Formula, Vol. 3 (2022). The music video was released on November 22, 2022.

== Charts ==
Chart performance for "Siri"
Chart (2022)	Peak position
Dominican Republic (Monitor Latino)	4
US Tropical Airplay (Billboard)	18

== Certifications ==
Certifications for "Siri"
Region	Certification	Certified units/sales
United States (RIAA)	3× Platinum (Latin)	180,000^{‡}
^{‡} Sales+streaming figures based on certification alone.
