= Aquí Te Espero =

2023 single by Iván Cornejo

Single by Iván Cornejo

from the album Mirada
- Released: July 28, 2023
- Genre: Regional Mexican
- Length: 4:15
- Label: Zaragoza; Interscope
- Songwriters: Iván Cornejo; Alberto Carlos Melendez; Francisco Ríos III
- Producers: Cornejo; Albert Hype; Frank Rio

Iván Cornejo singles chronology
"Inseparables" (2022)	"Aquí Te Espero" (2023)	"2ndo Chance" (2023)

Music video
- "Aquí Te Espero" on YouTube

"Aquí Te Espero" is a song by American singer-songwriter Iván Cornejo, released on July 28, 2023 as the lead single from his third studio album Mirada (2024). It was written and produced by Cornejo himself, Albert Hype and Frank Rio.

== Composition ==
The song finds Iván Cornejo reflecting on the end of a relationship over a guitar instrumental. Lyrically, he centers around a lover who took advantage of him, while expressing that he deeply misses her despite the complications.

== Music video ==
The music video was released alongside the single. Directed by Edgar Daniel, it sees Iván Cornejo in his messy room as he sadly remembers his former love interest. He tries to block out his memories of her but sees her everywhere he goes.

== Charts ==
=== Weekly charts ===
Weekly chart performance for "Aquí Te Espero"
Chart (2023)	Peak position
US Billboard Hot 100	89
US Hot Latin Songs (Billboard)	11

=== Year-end charts ===
Year-end chart performance for "Aquí Te Espero"
Chart (2023)	Position
US Hot Latin Songs (Billboard)	98
