= Los Mina =

- Location within the Dominican Republic
- Coordinates: 18°30′N 69°59′W
- Country: Dominican Republic
- City: Santo Domingo Este
- Province: Santo Domingo

Government
  - Mayor: Dío Astacio

Area
  - Total: 105.41 km^{2} (40.70 sq mi)

Population (2008)
  - Total: 104,846
  - Density: 5,981.46/km^{2} (15,491.9/sq mi)
- Time zone: UTC-4 UTC
  - Summer (DST): UTCNone
- Website: https://web.archive.org/web/20090107033827/http://www.asde.gov.do/

Los Mina (in full: San Lorenzo de Los Mina) is a sector in the city of Santo Domingo Este in the province of Santo Domingo of the Dominican Republic. Los Mina was part of Santo Domingo, Distrito Nacional. Santo Domingo Este was created as municipality in 2001 by law 163-01, splitting the Santo Domingo province from the Distrito Nacional with Santo Domingo Este taking the other sectors of Alma Rosa I, Alma Rosa II, El Almirante, Hainamosa, Invivienda, Lucerna, Mendoza, Ozama, Ralma, San Isidro, Sans Sousi, and Urbanización Italia.

It was founded as a village for formerly French-enslaved maroons in the late-1670s as San Lorenzo de los Negros de Mina, later shortened to San Lorenzo de Los Mina. During the 1822–44 Haitian occupation, the village was officially designated in the French language as Saint-Laurent des Mines.

== Notable people ==
- Monkey Black, (1986–2014) Rapper, he was murdered in Sant Adrià de Besòs, Barcelona in 2014.
- Gilbert Lenin Castillo, professional boxer who competed at the 2008 Summer Olympics.
- Lápiz Conciente ("Conscious Pen") is a Dominican rapper who refers to himself as "El Papa del Rap Dominicano" ("the father of Dominican rap") after sending Mozart La Para to the retired in peace.
- Hansel Emmanuel, a college basketball player known for his impressive skills despite having only one arm.
- Yailin La Más Viral, is a Dominican rapper and singer.

== Sources ==
- Santo Domingo Este Municipality
