= Está Dañada =

2021 single by Iván Cornejo

- Cover art of the remix featuring Jhay Cortez.

Single by Iván Cornejo

from the album Alma Vacía
- Released: August 20, 2021
- Genre: Sierreño
- Length: 3:34
- Label: Manzana
- Songwriter: Iván Cornejo
- Producer: Wounded Studios

Iván Cornejo singles chronology
| "Corazón Frío" (2021) | "Está Dañada" (2021) | "El Greñas Mentado" (2021) |

Music video
- "Está Dañada" on YouTube
- "Está Dañada" (Remix) on YouTube

"Está Dañada" is a song by American singer-songwriter Iván Cornejo, released on August 20, 2021 from his debut studio album Alma Vacía. The song went viral on the video-sharing app TikTok in September 2021, following which it became his breakout hit and peaked at number 61 on the Billboard Hot 100. It is his first and the second regional Mexican song to enter the chart.

== Composition ==
"Está Dañada" is a sierreño ranchera song with indie elements. The lyrics are about a heartbroken girl.

== Remix ==
Weeks after the song became successful, a remix was considered. The official remix, featuring Jhay Cortez, was released on December 3, 2021 with an accompanying music video. The clip was filmed in black and white in Miami in one day.

== Charts ==
=== Weekly charts ===
Weekly chart performance for "Está Dañada"
| Chart (2021) | Peak position |
|---|---|
| US Billboard Hot 100 | 61 |
| US Hot Latin Songs (Billboard) | 2 |

=== Year-end charts ===
Year-end chart performance for "Está Dañada"
| Chart (2021) | Position |
|---|---|
| US Hot Latin Songs (Billboard) | 68 |
| Chart (2022) | Position |
| US Hot Latin Songs (Billboard) | 40 |

== Certifications ==
| Region | Certification | Certified units/sales |
|---|---|---|
| United States (RIAA) | 8× Platinum (Latin) | 480,000^{‡} |
^{‡} Sales+streaming figures based on certification alone.
