= Obsessed Pt. 2 =

EP by Yahritza y su Esencia
- Released: October 8, 2023
- Genre: Mexican cumbia; urban sierreño
- Length: 22:14
- Language: Spanish
- Label: Lumbre; Columbia; Sony Latin
- Producer: Edgar Barrera; Ramón Ruíz; Yahritza Martínez; Armando Martínez; Jairo Martínez; César Avila

Yahritza y su Esencia chronology
Obsessed (2022)	Obsessed Pt. 2 (2023)	Memorias (2024)

Singles from Obsessed Pt. 2
- 1. "Inseparables" Released: October 7, 2022; 2. "Cambiaste" Released: January 5, 2023; 3. "Frágil" Released: April 7, 2023; 4. "Dos Extraños" Released: September 7, 2023

Obsessed Pt. 2 is the second EP by the American band of regional Mexican music Yahritza y su Esencia, which continues their previous debut EP, Obsessed. It was released on September 8, 2023, through the Lumbre Music, Columbia Records and Sony Music Latin record labels.

== Background and release ==
In 2023, at the end of August and beginning of September, in the middle of their Obsessed Tour, the group announced the launch of the project, scheduled for September 8, 2023.

== Composition ==
The EP consists of eight songs. Mostly, the album has regional Mexican songs that include sounds such as ranchera, sierreño and corridos, cumbia norteña, etc. The EP features collaborations with Grupo Frontera and Iván Cornejo.

== Singles ==
The first single, "Inseparables" featuring American singer Iván Cornejo, was released on October 6, 2022. The second single, "Cambiaste", was released on January 5, 2023. On April 7, 2023, "Frágil" was released featuring Mexican-American band Grupo Frontera as the fifth single. The sixth single, "Dos Extraños", was released on September 7, 2023, one day before the EP's release.

=== Promotional singles ===
On March 30, 2023, "No Se Puede Decir Adiós" and "Nuestra Canción" were released as promotional singles.

== Track listing ==
Obsessed Pt. 2 track listing
No.	Title	Writer(s)	Producer(s)	Length
1.	"Dos Extraños"	Edgar Barrera	Edgar Barrera • Ramón Ruíz	3:18
2.	"Dubai"	Yahritza Martínez • Edgar Barrera • José A. Martínez	Edgar Barrera	2:22
3.	"Rositas"	José A. Martínez • Edgar Barrera	Edgar Barrera	2:38
4.	"Frágil" (with Grupo Frontera)	Edgar Barrera • Kevyn Cruz • Luis Ángel O'Neill Laureano • Yahritza Martínez	Edgar Barrera	2:40
5.	"No Se Puede Decir Adiós"	Edgar Barrera • Kevyn Cruz	Edgar Barrera	2:45
6.	"Nuestra Canción"	Yahritza Martínez • Armando Martínez	Yahritza Martínez • Armando Martínez • Jairo Martínez	2:45
7.	"Cambiaste"	Yahritza Martínez	Armando Martínez • César Avila • Ramón Ruíz	2:55
8.	"Inseparables" (with Iván Cornejo)	Iván Cornejo • Yahritza Martínez	Armando Martínez	2:51
Total length:				22:14
