= Hansel Enmanuel =

Dominican basketball player (born 2003)

No. 24 – Austin Peay Governors
- Position: Point guard / shooting guard
- League: Atlantic Sun Conference

Personal information
- Born: 24 October 2003 (age 23) Santo Domingo, Dominican Republic
- Listed height: 6 ft 6 in (1.98 m)
- Listed weight: 175 lb (79 kg)

Career information
- High school: Life Christian Academy (Kissimmee, Florida)
- College: Northwestern State (2022–2023); Austin Peay (2023–present)

Hansel Enmanuel Donato Domínguez, known as Hansel Enmanuel, (born 24 October 2003) is a Dominican college basketball player for the Austin Peay Governors of the Atlantic Sun Conference (ASUN). He played high school basketball at Life Christian Academy in Kissimmee, Florida, and committed to play college basketball at Northwestern State, transferring after his freshman season.

Hansel went viral in early 2021 for his flashy dunks, passes, three-pointers and athleticism against top high school talent despite having only one arm due to a childhood incident.

== Early life ==
Hansel was born in Santo Domingo, Dominican Republic to Hansel Salvador Donato and Katia "Katy" Domínguez Pérez, and grew up in Los Mina, one of the poorest barrios in the city. His father had a standout career in the Dominican professional basketball league.

At the age of six, Hansel lost his left arm when a cinderblock wall came down on him and trapped him for two hours, requiring amputation below the shoulder. He was hospitalized for about six months. Despite his life-altering injuries, Hansel said he saw the experience as a "blessing." Forced to give up his preferred sport of baseball, he switched his focus to basketball thereafter. His father was initially against the idea because he thought he would get hurt, but later served as one of his biggest supporters.

With only one arm, Hansel had difficulty keeping his equilibrium while running, often falling to the ground. However, he reached a height of 5 ft 9 in (1.75 m) by the age of 11 and was 6 ft 0 in (1.83 m) tall the following year. At age 13, Hansel began attending basketball camps and tournaments in the United States, and he began realizing his potential. He dunked for the first time at age 14. Hansel gained recognition in 2020 after posting videos on social media of him playing streetball in his hometown of Santo Domingo. That October, he appeared on national television when he was interviewed on El Show del Mediodía (The Noon Show) on Color Visión.

== High school career ==
Hansel moved to the United States in January 2021 after receiving a scholarship to play at Life Christian Academy (LCA) in Kissimmee, Florida. The team's head coach, Moisés Micael, was an old teammate of his father's who saw his videos online and convinced him to make the move. Within weeks of his arrival his highlight videos went viral on social media again. Hansel's performance at the Orlando Winter Showdown further elevated his profile after he averaged 25 points and 11 rebounds per game throughout the tournament. Hansel was a two-year letterwinner at LCA. As a senior, he averaged 25.9 points, 11 rebounds, 6.9 assists and 3.4 blocks per game while helping his team win a Central Florida Christian Academy state title. He also played on the Amateur Athletic Union (AAU) circuit for SOH Elite.

=== Recruiting ===
Hansel was rated a three-star recruit by 247Sports and was ranked the no. 243 prospect in the nation by On3. He received his first Division I offer from Tennessee State in August 2021. That offer was followed by an offer from Memphis in February 2022.

In June 2022, he announced that he was considering Memphis, Northwestern State and Bethune–Cookman, as well as the Overtime Elite professional league. He committed to Northwestern State on July 23.

== College career ==
=== Northwestern State ===
Hansel arrived at Northwestern State University in late August 2022, missing summer workouts due to obligations to endorsements. He made his collegiate debut for the Demons on November 12, recording one steal and committing two fouls in eight minutes of play. Hansel scored his first career points in his fifth game, a win against Louisiana–Monroe on December 10. He scored five points on two-for-three shooting, including a dunk coming off of an offensive rebound of his own missed free throw.

As a freshman, Hansel appeared in 20 games and started the last five, averaging 1.7 points and 1.2 rebounds in 8.2 minutes per game. He entered his name into the NCAA transfer portal in March 2023.

=== Austin Peay ===
For his sophomore season, Hansel transferred to Austin Peay, where his head coach at Northwestern State, Corey Gipson, had been hired in the same position.

In the 2023–24 season, he appeared in 30 games, made three starts and recorded 24 blocks. In 2024–25, he appeared in 23 games, made six starts and recorded 16 blocks.

== Personal life ==
Hansel is nicknamed Kikimita after his father, who was called Kikima during his playing career. Aside from his dad he cites LeBron James and Kevin Durant as his idols. Hansel has four siblings: Abigail, Kaira, Jhohansel, and Salomon.

=== Social media and endorsements ===
Hansel has established a large social media following since moving to the United States. In April 2022, he signed a name, image, and likeness (NIL) deal with Banreservas, a State-owned bank of the Dominican Republic. He signed a deal with Gatorade, starring in a national commercial spot that aired in June as part of the brand's Fuel Tomorrow campaign.
