= La Última Vez =

2022 song by Romeo Santos

Song by Romeo Santos with Luis Miguel Del Amargue

from the album Formula, Vol. 3
- Released: September 1, 2022 (album release)
- Genre: Bachata
- Length: 3:40
- Label: Sony Latin
- Songwriter: Anthony "Romeo" Santos
- Producers: Anthony "Romeo" Santos; Mate Traxx

"La Última Vez" (English: "The Last Time") is a song by American singer Romeo Santos and Dominican singer Luis Miguel Del Amargue. It is the twentieth track of Santos' fifth studio album Formula, Vol. 3 (2022). It features the participation of Dominican DJ, DJ Adoni.

== Charts ==
Chart performance for "La Última Vez"
Chart (2022)	Peak position
Dominican Republic Bachata (Monitor Latino)	10

== Certifications ==
Certifications for "La Última Vez"
Region	Certification	Certified units/sales
United States (RIAA)	Gold (Latin)	30,000^{‡}
^{‡} Sales+streaming figures based on certification alone.
