= Frágil (Yahritza y su Esencia and Grupo Frontera song) =

Single by Yahritza y su Esencia and Grupo Frontera

from the EP Obsessed Pt. 2
- Language: Spanish
- English title: "Fragile"
- Released: April 7, 2023
- Genre: Regional Mexican • norteño cumbia
- Length: 2:40
- Label: Lumbre Music • Columbia Records • Sony Music Latin
- Songwriter: Édgar Barrera • Kevyn Cruz • Luis Ángel O'Neill Laureano • Yahritza Martínez
- Producer: Barrera

Yahritza y su Esencia singles chronology
"Cambiaste" (2023)	"Frágil" (2023)	"Dos Extraños" (2023)

Grupo Frontera singles chronology
"Dame Un Chance (La Cumbia Bélica)" (2023)	"Frágil" (2023)	"Un x100to" (2023)

Music video
- "Frágil" on YouTube

"Frágil" (English: "Fragile") is a regional Mexican song by the American bands Yahritza y su Esencia and Grupo Frontera. It was written by Kevyn Cruz, Luis Ángel O'Neill Laureano, Yahritza Martínez and Édgar Barrera, who also produced it. It was released as a single on April 7, 2023, through Lumbre Music, Columbia Records and distributed by Sony Music Latin.

The song is one of the biggest hits for both groups, as it reached position 68 on the Billboard Hot 100 list and was certified platinum by AMPROFON in Mexico.

The song was popular again in June 2023, after the president of Mexico, Andrés Manuel López Obrador, broadcast it during one of his morning press conferences, known colloquially as "mañaneras".

== Critical reception ==
Wow magazine published: "It is a song loaded with emotions, both vocalists sing about heartbreak and weakness in love".

== Commercial performance ==
The song debuted on the Billboard Hot 100 chart in the week of May 6, 2023 at position number 82, being Yahritza y su Esencia's second entry and Grupo Frontera's sixth on the list.

== Music and lyrics ==
"Frágil"
A 28 seconds sample of the chorus.

Musically it is a Mexican northern cumbia song, with arrangements of sierreña and grupera music, lyrically it is about heartbreak, and a person's questioning of their partner as to why they have broken their heart. The lyrics includes, "¿Por qué no tengo un corazón así? / Así como el que te dieron a ti / Porque el que me tocó a mí es frágil / Por eso lo rompiste fácil / Y yo queriendo un corazón así / Así como el que te dieron a ti / Porque el que me tocó a mí es frágil / Por eso lo rompiste fácil".

== Music video ==
An official video was published on Yahritza y su Esencia's YouTube channel hours before the song's premiere on digital platforms.

== Live presentations ==
On April 2, 2023, prior to the official release of the single, both groups performed the song live for the first time at the Tecate Pa'l Norte music festival in Monterrey, Mexico before approximately 100,000 people in attendance. Yahritza y su Esencia were the guests of Grupo Frontera at that presentation.

== Charts ==
=== Weekly charts ===
Weekly chart performance for "Frágil"
Chart (2023)	Peak position
Argentina Hot 100	28
Bolivia Songs (Billboard)	2
Costa Rica (Monitor Latino)	5
Ecuador Songs (Billboard)	12
El Salvador (Monitor Latino)	2
Global 200 (Billboard)	37
Guatemala (Monitor Latino)	2
Mexico Songs (Billboard)	7
Dutch Top 40	8
Peru Songs (Billboard)	11
Uruguay (Monitor Latino)	3
US Billboard Hot 100	69
US Hot Latin Songs (Billboard)	11

=== Year-end charts ===
Year-end chart performance for "Frágil"
Chart (2023)	Position
Global 200 (Billboard)	150
US Hot Latin Songs (Billboard)	21

== Certifications ==
Certifications for "Frágil"
Region	Certification	Certified units/sales
Mexico (AMPROFON)	Diamond+Gold	770,000^{‡}
United States (RIAA)	Platinum	1,000,000^{‡}
^{‡} Sales+streaming figures based on certification alone.
