= 2ndo Chance =

Single by Becky G and Iván Cornejo

from the album Esquinas
- Language: Spanish
- English title: "Second Chance"
- Released: September 27, 2023
- Genre: Latin pop
- Length: 3:52
- Label: Kemosabe; RCA
- Songwriters: Rebbeca Marie Gomez; Iván Cornejo; Édgar Barrera; Alex Luna; Hector Andre Mazzarri Ramos; Luis Miguel Gómez Castaño; Manuel Lorente Freire; Francisco Ríos
- Producers: Édgar Barrera; Casta; Francisco Ríos

Becky G singles chronology
"Coming Your Way" (2023)	"2ndo Chance" (2023)	"Amigos" (2023)

Iván Cornejo singles chronology
"Aquí Te Espero" (2023)	"2ndo Chance" (2023)	"Dónde Estás" (2023)

Music video
- "2ndo Chance" (Live Performance) on YouTube

"2ndo Chance" is a song by American singer Becky G and Mexican-American singer Iván Cornejo. It was released on September 27, 2023, by Kemosabe and RCA Records as the third single from Becky G's third album, Esquinas (2023).

== Music video ==
The music video was released on September 28, 2023, and was directed by Elias Lopez.

== Accolades ==
Awards and nominations for "2ndo Chance"
Organization	Year	Category	Result	Ref.
Latin Grammy Awards	2024	Songwriter of the Year (Note: Awards and nominations Manuel Lorente Freire has received as songwriter.)	Nominated	

== Credits and personnel ==
Credits adapted from Apple Music.

- Becky G – vocals, writer
- Iván Cornejo – vocals, writer
- Édgar Barrera – writer, producer
- Alex Luna – writer
- Hector Andre Mazzarri Ramos – writer
- Luis Miguel Gómez Castaño – writer, producer
- Manuel Lorente Freire – writer
- Francisco Ríos – writer, producer
- Carlos Molina – vocal producer, engineer
- Namln Kang – assistant engineer
- Paulo Uribe – engineer
- Luis Barrera Jr. – mixing engineer, mastering engineer
- Alejandro Ramirez – engineer

== Charts ==
Chart performance for "2ndo Chance"
Chart (2023)	Peak position
US Hot Latin Songs (Billboard)	34

== Release history ==
Release dates and formats for "2ndo Chance"
Region	Date	Format	Label	Ref.
Various	September 27, 2023	Digital download; streaming	Kemosabe; RCA	
