= Bebo (song) =

2022 single by Romeo Santos

Single by Romeo Santos

from the album Formula, Vol. 3
- Released: September 9, 2022
- Recorded: 2020
- Genre: Bachata
- Length: 3:55
- Label: Sony Latin
- Songwriter: Anthony "Romeo" Santos
- Producers: Romeo Santos; Mate Traxx

Romeo Santos singles chronology
"El Pañuelo" (2022)	"Bebo" (2022)	"Me Extraño" (2022)

Music video
- "Bebo" on YouTube

"Bebo" (English: "I Drink") is a song by American singer Romeo Santos. It is the fourth single from Santos' fifth studio album Formula, Vol. 3 (2022). Santos had posted a video on social media teasing the single on August 22, 2022. Some thought it was going to be the second single for the album. The music video was released on September 9, 2022.

== Charts ==
Chart performance for "Bebo"
Chart (2022)	Peak position
Colombia Airplay (National Report)	1
Dominican Republic Bachata (Monitor Latino)	2
Dominican Republic General (Monitor Latino)	12
US Hot Latin Songs (Billboard)	41
US Tropical Airplay (Billboard)	16

== Certifications ==
Certifications for "Bebo"
Region	Certification	Certified units/sales
United States (RIAA)	4× Platinum (Latin)	240,000^{‡}
^{‡} Sales+streaming figures based on certification alone.
