= Dónde Estás =

2023 single by Iván Cornejo

Single by Iván Cornejo

from the album Mirada
- Released: October 12, 2023
- Genre: Sierreño
- Length: 4:09
- Label: Zaragoza; Interscope
- Songwriters: Iván Cornejo; Francisco Ríos III
- Producers: Cornejo; Frank Rio

Iván Cornejo singles chronology
| "2ndo Chance" (2024) | "Dónde Estás" (2023) | "Baby Please" (2024) |

Music video
- "Dónde Estás" on YouTube

"Dónde Estás" is a song by American singer-songwriter Iván Cornejo, released on October 12, 2023 as the second single from his third studio album Mirada (2024). It was written and produced by Cornejo himself and Frank Rio.

== Composition ==
"Dónde Estás" is a sierreño song, with a dreamy and moody atmosphere. The instrumental begins with synthesizers, followed by acoustic guitar and soothing harmonies as Iván Cornejo sings a soft melody. The lyrics are about love and heartbreak.

== Charts ==
Chart performance for "Dónde Estás"
| Chart (2023) | Peak position |
|---|---|
| US Bubbling Under Hot 100 (Billboard) | 7 |
| US Hot Latin Songs (Billboard) | 27 |
