= 15,500 Noches =

2022 song by Romeo Santos

Song by Romeo Santos with Fernando Villalona, Rubby Pérez, and Toño Rosario featuring Ramón Orlando

from the album Formula, Vol. 3
- Released: September 1, 2022 (album release)
- Genre: Merengue
- Length: 4:14
- Label: Sony Latin
- Songwriters: Anthony "Romeo" Santos; Joaquin Diaz
- Producers: Anthony "Romeo" Santos; Mate Traxx

"15,500 Noches" (English: "15,500 Nights") is a song by American singer Romeo Santos and Dominican merengue musicians Fernando Villalona, Rubby Pérez, Toño Rosario, and Ramón Orlando as a featured artist. It is the ninth track of Santos' fifth studio album Formula, Vol. 3 (2022).

== Charts ==
Chart performance for "15,500 Noches"
Chart (2022)	Peak position
Dominican Republic Merengue (Monitor Latino)	6
US Tropical Airplay (Billboard)	13

== Certifications ==
Certifications for "15,500 Noches"
Region	Certification	Certified units/sales
United States (RIAA)	Platinum (Latin)	60,000^{‡}
^{‡} Sales+streaming figures based on certification alone.
