= Soy el Único =

2022 single by Yahritza y Su Esencia

Single by Yahritza y su Esencia

from the EP Obsessed
- Language: Spanish
- Released: March 25, 2022
- Genre: Regional Mexican
- Length: 3:34
- Label: Lumbre Music
- Songwriter: Yahritza Martínez
- Producer: Ramon Ruiz

Yahritza y su Esencia singles chronology
"Soy el Único" (2022)	"Esta Noche" (2022)

Music video
- "Soy el Único" on YouTube

"Soy el Único" is the debut single by American regional Mexican trio Yahritza y su Esencia, released on March 25, 2022. It is the lead single from their debut EP Obsessed (2022) and their highest-charting song, peaking at number 20 on the Billboard Hot 100.

== Background ==
"Soy el Único" is the first song that Yahritza Martínez ever wrote, at the age of 13. Specifically written from a male perspective, it was inspired by a breakup which her brother Mando had experienced, as well as a clip on TikTok which she found when studying videos on the platform from other users concerning relationship drama. At first, Yahritza was "really scared" to release the song because she did not want her family to think the song was about her former partner.

In mid-February, a 15-second clip of Yahritza recording the chorus of the song at the studio went viral on TikTok, largely due to its line "Mucho tiempo me gastaste y eso no puedo recuperarlo / Trato de olvidarte esta noche, como deberia de hacer hace tiempo". As a result of the success, Ramón Ruiz and Alex Guerra, members of the group Legado 7 and founders of Lumbre Music, spoke to Yahritza y Su Esencia and flew to Yakima, Washington to sign them.

== Music video ==
An official music video was directed by Jaime Aquino.

== Charts ==
Chart performance for "Soy el Único"
Chart (2022)	Peak position
Global 200 (Billboard)	29
Mexico (Billboard)	7
US Billboard Hot 100	20
US Hot Latin Songs (Billboard)	1

== Certifications ==
Certifications for "Soy el Único"
Region	Certification	Certified units/sales
United States (RIAA)	Diamond (Latin)	600,000^{‡}
^{‡} Sales+streaming figures based on certification alone.
