= Dañado =

- Standard edition cover

Studio album by Iván Cornejo
- Released: June 2, 2022
- Genre: Regional Mexican
- Length: 25:10
- Label: Manzana
- Producer: Andrés García

Iván Cornejo chronology
Alma Vacía (2021)	Dañado (2022)	Mirada (2024)

Singles from Dañado
- 1. "Perro Abandonado" Released: February 11, 2022

Dañado is the second studio album by American singer-songwriter Iván Cornejo, which was released on June 2, 2022, through Manzana Records. It features a sole guest appearance by American regional Mexican band Eslabon Armado on "La Curiosidad". It peaked at number 28 on the US Billboard 200 chart and won the award for Regional Mexican Album of the Year at the 2023 Billboard Latin Music Awards.

== Accolades ==
Dañado received two nominations at the 2023 Latin American Music Awards, which were for Album of the Year and Favorite Regional Mexican Album. The album won the award for Regional Mexican Album of the Year at the 2023 Billboard Latin Music Awards, while it was nominated for Top Latin Album of the Year. It was also nominated the Billboard Music Award for Top Latin Album at the 2023 Billboard Music Awards.

== Commercial performance ==
Dañado debuted at number 149 on the US Billboard 200 chart with 8,000 album-equivalent units, making it Cornejo's second entry on the chart; it simultaneously debuted at numbers four and one on the US Top Latin Albums and Regional Mexican Albums charts, respectively. Following the release of the album's deluxe version, it reached a new peak on the first two charts, peaking at numbers 28 and two, respectively.

== Track listing ==
All tracks are written by Iván Cornejo, except where noted.

Dañado track listing
No.	Title	Writer(s)	Producer(s)	Length
1.	"Está Dañado"		Andrés García	3:21
2.	"Me Hiciste un Loco"		García	3:27
3.	"J."		García	3:55
4.	"¡Corre!"	Jesse Huerta; Joy Huerta; Tommy Torres	García	3:50
5.	"La Curiosidad" (with Eslabon Armado)	Iván Cornejo; César López Zazueta	García	3:36
6.	"No Me Quise Ir"		García	3:30
7.	"Perro Abandonado"		García	3:31
Total length:				25:10

Deluxe edition track listing
No.	Title	Producer(s)	Length
8.	"La Última Vez"	Cornejo; Frank Rio	4:12
9.	"Tatuajes"	Cornejo; Rio	3:18
10.	"Ya Te Perdí"	Cornejo; Rio	4:24
Total length:			37:04

== Charts ==
=== Weekly charts ===
Weekly chart performance for Dañado
Chart (2022)	Peak position
US Billboard 200	28
US Independent Albums (Billboard)	3
US Regional Mexican Albums (Billboard)	1
US Top Latin Albums (Billboard)	2

=== Year-end charts ===
2022 year-end chart performance for Dañado
Chart (2022)	Position
US Independent Albums (Billboard)	40
US Regional Mexican Albums (Billboard)	2
US Top Latin Albums (Billboard)	18

2023 year-end chart performance for Dañado
Chart (2023)	Position
US Billboard 200	152
US Independent Albums (Billboard)	17
US Regional Mexican Albums (Billboard)	2
US Top Latin Albums (Billboard)	5

== Certifications ==
Certifications for Dañado
Region	Certification	Certified units/sales
United States (RIAA)	5× Platinum (Latin)	300,000^{‡}
^{‡} Sales+streaming figures based on certification alone.
