= Me Extraño =

2022 single by Romeo Santos

Single by Romeo Santos and Christian Nodal

from the album Formula, Vol. 3
- Released: October 13, 2022
- Recorded: 2022
- Genre: Regional Mexican
- Length: 3:11
- Label: Sony Latin
- Songwriters: Anthony "Romeo" Santos; Johan Arjona
- Producers: Romeo Santos; Mate Traxx

Romeo Santos singles chronology
"Bebo" (2022)	"Me Extraño" (2022)	"SIRI" (2022)

Christian Nodal singles chronology
"Vivo En El 6" (2022)	"Me Extraño" (2022)

Music video
- "Me Extraño" on YouTube

"Me Extraño" (English: "I Miss Myself") is a song by American singer Romeo Santos and Mexican singer Christian Nodal. It is the fifth single for Santos' fifth studio album Formula, Vol. 3 (2022). The music video was released on October 13, 2022.

== Charts ==
Chart performance for "Me Extraño"
Chart (2022)	Peak position
US Hot Latin Songs (Billboard)	46

== Certifications ==
Certifications for "Me Extraño"
Region	Certification	Certified units/sales
Mexico (AMPROFON)	Platinum+Gold	210,000^{‡}
United States (RIAA)	3× Platinum (Latin)	180,000^{‡}
^{‡} Sales+streaming figures based on certification alone.
