= Intercambio Injusto =

2024 single by Iván Cornejo

Single by Iván Cornejo

from the album Mirada
- Released: July 12, 2024
- Genre: Sierreño
- Length: 3:25
- Label: Zaragoza; Interscope
- Songwriters: Iván Cornejo; Francisco Ríos III; Sara Schell
- Producers: Cornejo; Frank Rio

Iván Cornejo singles chronology
"Baby Please" (2024)	"Intercambio Injusto" (2024)	"Me Prometí" (2025)

"Intercambio Injusto" is a song by American singer-songwriter Iván Cornejo, released on July 12, 2024, as the fourth single from his third studio album, Mirada (2024). It was written Cornejo himself, Frank Rio and Sara Schell and produced by the former two.

The song was featured in the short film ¡Suerte!, which was published by Apple and shot on iPhone 15 Pro. The movie stars Cornejo, María Zardoya of the Marías and Mexican singer Edén Muñoz as characters of the board game lotería, with Cornejo portraying the musician.

== Composition ==
In an interview with Rolling Stone, Iván Cornejo stated the song is about "an uneven exchange in a relationship. Sometimes despite giving it your all, the return isn't always the same." The song contains guitar arrangements, over which Cornejo expresses his broken heart.

== Charts ==
Chart performance for "Intercambio Injusto"
Chart (2024)	Peak position
US Bubbling Under Hot 100 (Billboard)	19
US Hot Latin Songs (Billboard)	7
