= Boomerang (Romeo Santos song) =

2023 single by Romeo Santos

Single by Romeo Santos

from the album Formula, Vol. 3
- Language: Spanish
- Released: September 1, 2023
- Genre: Bachata
- Length: 4:07
- Label: Sony Latin
- Songwriters: Anthony "Romeo" Santos; Alexander Caba; Adam King Feeny; Allen Ritter; Anderson Hernandez
- Producers: Romeo Santos; Mate Traxx

Romeo Santos singles chronology
"Suegra" (2023)	"Boomerang" (2023)	"Ángel" (2024)

Music video
- "Boomerang" on YouTube

"Boomerang" is a song by American singer Romeo Santos. It was released as the fourth track of his fifth studio album Formula, Vol. 3 (2022). The music video was released on September 1, 2023, in celebration of the 1st anniversary of the album. It was directed by Willy Rodríguez and starred model Gema Álvarez.

== Charts ==
Chart performance for "Boomerang"
Chart (2023)	Peak position
US Tropical Airplay (Billboard)	16

== Certifications ==
Certifications for "Boomerang"
Region	Certification	Certified units/sales
United States (RIAA)	Platinum (Latin)	60,000^{‡}
^{‡} Sales+streaming figures based on certification alone.
