= Baby Please =

2024 single by Iván Cornejo

Single by Iván Cornejo

from the album Mirada
- Released: March 14, 2024
- Genre: Sierreño
- Length: 2:58
- Label: Zaragoza; Interscope
- Songwriters: Iván Cornejo; Francisco Ríos III
- Producer: Frank Rio

Iván Cornejo singles chronology
"Dónde Estás" (2023)	"Baby Please" (2024)	"Intercambio Injusto" (2024)

Music video
- "Baby Please" on YouTube

"Baby Please" is a song by American singer-songwriter Iván Cornejo, released on March 14, 2024 as the third single from his third studio album Mirada (2024). It was produced by Frank Rio.

== Background ==
Iván Cornejo stated the song was inspired by "the desperate desire we feel during our lowest moments in a break up. We hate the attachment, but love the thought of a rekindled love."

== Composition ==
"Baby Please" is a "sad sierreño" song. The production consists of guitar, bass chords, drums and violin, while the lyrics find Iván Cornejo addressing his ex-lover, begging for them to start over in their relationship.

== Charts ==
Chart performance for "Baby Please"
Chart (2024)	Peak position
US Billboard Hot 100	95
US Hot Latin Songs (Billboard)	8
