= Inseparables (song) =

2022 single by Yahritza y su Esencia and Iván Cornejo

Single by Yahritza y su Esencia and Iván Cornejo

from the EP Obsessed Pt. 2
- Released: October 7, 2022
- Genre: Sierreño
- Length: 2:51
- Label: Lumbre; Columbia; Sony Latin
- Songwriters: Iván Cornejo; Yahritza Martínez
- Producer: Armando Martínez

Yahritza y su Esencia singles chronology
"Esta Noche" (2022)	"Inseparables" (2022)	"Cambiaste" (2023)

Iván Cornejo singles chronology
"La Curiosidad" (2022)	"Inseparables" (2022)	"Aquí Te Espero" (2023)

Music video
- "Inseparables" on YouTube

"Inseparables" is a song by American regional Mexican trio Yahritza y su Esencia and American singer-songwriter Iván Cornejo. It was released on October 7, 2022 as the lead single from the former's second EP Obsessed Pt. 2 (2023).

== Composition ==
"Inseparables" is a sierreño ballad that finds Yahritza Martínez and Iván Cornejo singing about missing their lovers and their desire to be in their company. The instrumental is composed of 12-string guitar and bajoloche.

== Critical reception ==
Remezcla wrote that "Yahritza's inimitable and rather alto-leaning vocals meet Cornejo's deeper, more baritone voice to coexist beautifully over the wistful melody". Lucas Villa of Uproxx commented, "Martínez's soulful voice sounds beyond her years while Cornejo complements her well with his alternative edge."

== Music video ==
The music video was released alongside the single. Directed by Johnny Ragr and shot in downtown Los Angeles, it sees Yahritza y su Esencia cruising around the city and Yahritza Martínez performing with Iván Cornejo on a rooftop that overlooks the area.

== Charts ==
Chart performance for "Inseparables"
Chart (2022)	Peak position
US Bubbling Under Hot 100 (Billboard)	5
US Hot Latin Songs (Billboard)	17
