= Ayúdame (Romeo Santos song) =

2022 song by Romeo Santos

Song by Romeo Santos

from the album Formula, Vol. 3
- Released: September 1, 2022 (album release)
- Recorded: 2021
- Genre: Bachata
- Length: 3:44
- Label: Sony Latin
- Songwriter: Anthony "Romeo" Santos
- Producers: Anthony "Romeo" Santos; Mate Traxx

"Ayúdame" (English: "Help Me") is a song by American singer Romeo Santos. It is the third track of his fifth studio album Formula, Vol. 3 (2022). It peaked at number 7 on the US Billboard Tropical Airplay chart. It was certified the United States by the Recording Industry Association of America (RIAA).

== Charts ==
Chart performance for "Ayúdame"
Chart (2023)	Peak position
US Latin Digital Song Sales (Billboard)	18
US Latin Airplay (Billboard)	44
US Tropical Airplay (Billboard)	7

== Certifications ==
Certifications for "Ayúdame"
Region	Certification	Certified units/sales
United States (RIAA)	Platinum (Latin)	60,000^{‡}
^{‡} Sales+streaming figures based on certification alone.
