= Me Prometí =

2025 single by Iván Cornejo

Single by Iván Cornejo
- Released: May 1, 2025
- Genre: Regional Mexican
- Length: 2:51
- Label: Zaragoza; Interscope
- Songwriter(s): Iván Cornejo; Arath Herce Blanco; Sara Schell; Francisco Ríos III
- Producer(s): Cornejo; Frank Rio

Iván Cornejo singles chronology
| "Intercambio Injusto" (2024) | "Me Prometí" (2025) |

"Me Prometí" is a single by American singer-songwriter Iván Cornejo, released on May 1, 2025. It was written by Cornejo himself, Arath Herce, Sara Schell and Frank Rio, who also produced the song with Cornejo.

== Composition ==
The song blends "airy synths" with "stripped-down acoustic melodies", creating a tone reminiscent of rock music.

== Live performances ==
Iván Cornejo performed the song on The Tonight Show Starring Jimmy Fallon on May 6, 2025.

== Charts ==
Chart performance for "Me Prometí"
| Chart (2025) | Peak position |
|---|---|
| US Billboard Hot 100 | 95 |
| US Hot Latin Songs (Billboard) | 9 |
