= Mirada =

2024 studio album by Iván Cornejo

Studio album by Iván Cornejo
- Released: July 19, 2024
- Genres: Regional Mexican; alternative rock
- Length: 37:14
- Language: Spanish
- Labels: Interscope; Zaragoza
- Producers: Albert Hype; Frank Rio; Iván Cornejo

Iván Cornejo chronology
Dañado (2022)	Mirada (2024)

Singles from Mirada
- 1. "Aquí Te Espero" Released: July 28, 2023; 2. "Dónde Estás" Released: October 12, 2023; 3. "Baby Please" Released: March 14, 2024; 4. "Intercambio Injusto" Released: July 12, 2024

Mirada (transl. Gaze) is the third and major-label debut studio album by American singer-songwriter Iván Cornejo. It was released on July 19, 2024, by Interscope and Zaragoza Records, making it Cornejo's first album to be released under those labels, and his first to not be released by Manzana Records. It debuted at number 17 on the US Billboard 200, additionally debuting atop the US Top Latin Albums and Regional Mexican Albums charts, with 34,000 album-equivalent units.

== Background ==
Mirada is Iván Cornejo's first album with Interscope Records. He announced the album on June 18, 2024. A trailer for the album was released in the same month, which sees Cornejo sitting in front of a bonfire, containing a background narration between him and an unknown voice. Its tracklist was later revealed at the beginning of July of the same year.

== Composition ==
Mirada is a regional Mexican album, with incorporations of alternative rock. "Quiero Dormir Cansado" is a surf rock cover of Mexican singer Emmanuel's song of the same name, while "Atención" is described by Cornejo as a "dance-y" track due to its time signature being at 4/4 instead of 3/4, a common time signature used in corridos tumbados.

== Promotion ==
"Aquí Te Espero" was released on July 28, 2023, as the lead single from Mirada. "Dónde Estás" was released as the album's second single on October 12, 2023. "Baby Please" was released on March 14, 2024, as the album's third single. It peaked at number 95 on the Billboard Hot 100 and number eight on the US Hot Latin Songs chart. He later announced, on June 18, 2024, that he would embark the album's supporting tour. "Intercambio Injusto" was released on July 12, 2024, as the fourth single from the album. The song was also featured in a short film published by Apple, ¡Suerte!, which stars himself, María Zardoya of the Marías and Edén Muñoz as characters of the Lotería.

== Commercial performance ==
Mirada debuted at number 17 on the US Billboard 200 with 34,000 album-equivalent units, making it his third entry on the chart. Additionally, it debuted atop the US Top Latin Albums and Regional Mexican Albums charts, making his first number-one album on the former and his second on the latter.

== Track listing ==
All tracks are written and produced by Iván Cornejo and Frank Rio, except where noted.

Mirada track listing
No.	Title	Writer(s)	Producer(s)	Length
1.	"Sale Para Ser Feliz"	Cornejo; Francisco Rios III; Arath Herce	Cornejo; Rios	3:12
2.	"Intercambio Injusto"	Rios; Cornejo; Sara Schell	Cornejo; Rio	3:25
3.	"Baby Please"	Cornejo; Rios	Rio	2:58
4.	"Herida Abierta"	Cornejo; Rios; Edge	Cornejo; Rio	3:37
5.	"Vuelve"	Cornejo; Rios; Edge; Juan Carlos Corral Félix	Cornejo; Rio	2:42
6.	"Interlude"	Cornejo; Rios	Cornejo; Rio	0:44
7.	"Quiero Dormir Cansado"	Ana Magdalena; Manuel Álvarez Beigbeder Pérez	Cornejo; Rio	3:27
8.	"Aquí Te Espero"	Alberto Carlos Melendez; Cornejo; Rios	Albert Hype; Cornejo; Rios	4:15
9.	"Mirada"	Cornejo; Rios; Herce; Schell	Cornejo; Rio	2:48
10.	"Atención"	Cornejo; Rios; Edge	Cornejo; Rio	4:14
11.	"Dónde Estás"	Cornejo; Rios	Cornejo; Rio	4:09
12.	"Outro (Duérmete)"	Cornejo	Cornejo; Rio	1:43
Total length:				37:14

== Charts ==
Chart performance for Mirada
Chart (2024)	Peak position
US Billboard 200	17
US Regional Mexican Albums (Billboard)	1
US Top Latin Albums (Billboard)	1
