= Formula, Vol. 3 =

2022 studio album by Romeo Santos

Studio album by Romeo Santos
- Released: September 1, 2022
- Recorded: 2020–2022
- Genres: Bachata; merengue; ranchera; hip hop; Latin trap
- Length: 75:13
- Languages: Spanish; English
- Label: Sony Latin
- Producers: Romeo Santos; Ivan Chevere (co-producer)

Romeo Santos chronology
| Utopía Live from MetLife Stadium (2021) | Formula, Vol. 3 (2022) | Better Late Than Never (2025) |

Singles from Formula, Vol. 3
- 1. "Sus Huellas" Released: February 14, 2022; 2. "Sin Fin" Released: September 1, 2022; 3. "El Pañuelo" Released: September 2, 2022; 4. "Bebo" Released: September 9, 2022; 5. "Me Extraño" Released: October 13, 2022; 6. "Siri" Released: November 22, 2022; 7. "Solo Conmigo" Released: January 17, 2023; 8. "Suegra" Released: March 3, 2023; 9. "Boomerang" Released: September 1, 2023

Formula, Vol. 3 is the fifth studio album by American singer Romeo Santos, released on September 1, 2022, by Sony Music Latin. It is the third installment of Santos' Formula trilogy following Formula, Vol. 1 (2011). and Formula, Vol. 2 (2014). Musically, it combines traditional bachata with innovative fusions exploring and experimenting dance, tropical house, hip hop and pop. It features several guest appearances by international stars such as Rosalía and Justin Timberlake. Also, it contains guest appearances by artists of his natal Dominican Republic such as Toño Rosario, Lápiz Conciente, Ramón Orlando, Luis Miguel del Amargue, Rubby Pérez, Fernando Villalona and Chris Lebron. The album contains 21 tracks, including 19 songs, one skit and an intro.

Recorded and written between 2020 and 2022, Formula, Vol. 3 received mixed to positive reviews from critics. While some praised the production and features, others criticized the lyrics on some tracks and the approach of traditional bachata. It won the Latin Grammy for Best Merengue/Bachata Album, becoming his first Grammy ever. The album was supported by the release of nine singles along with their music videos.

Formula, Vol. 3 debut at the top ten of US Billboard 200 and reached the number one of US Tropical Albums, just like the previous two efforts of the trilogy. It was certified platinum (Latin filed) by the RIAA. To promote the album, Santos embarked on Fórmula, Vol. 3: La Gira (2022).

== Singles ==
=== Main singles ===
"Sus Huellas" is the first single from the album. It was released on February 14, 2022, along with the music video. On the Billboard charts, it peaked at number 10 on the Hot Latin Songs chart, and at number 1 on the Latin and Tropical Airplay charts. On the Monitor Latino charts, peaked at number 1 on the Colombia and Puerto Rico General charts. On its Dominican Republic charts, it peaked at number 5 in the General chart and at number 1 on the Bachata chart.

"Sin Fin" is the second single and features American singer Justin Timberlake. It was released on the same day as the album along with the music video. On the Billboard charts. it peaked at number 100 on the Billboard Hot 100, at 15 on the Hot Latin Songs chart, and at number 1 on both the Billboard Latin and Tropical Airplay charts. It also peaked at number 1 on the Monitor Latino's Puerto Rico chart.

"El Pañuelo" is the third single and features Spaniard singer Rosalía. The music video was released the day after the album released on September 2, 2022. On the Billboard charts, the song peaked at number 134 on the Billboard Global 200, at number 1 on both the Latin and Tropical Airplay chart, and at number 8 on the Spain Song chart. It also peaked at number 7 on Spain's PROMUSICAE chart and at number 1 on the Monitor Latino's Mexico chart.

"Bebo" is the fourth single. The music video was released on September 9, 2022. The song peaked at 41 on the Hot Latin Songs chart and at number 16 on the Billboard Tropical Airplay chart.

"Me Extraño" is the fifth single and features Mexican singer Christian Nodal. It is the first non-bachata single of the album. The song is of the Regional Mexican genre. The music video was released on October 13, 2022. The song peaked at number 46 on the Billboard Hot Latin Songs chart.

"Siri" is the sixth single and features Dominican singer Chris Lebron. The music video was released on November 22, 2022. The song peaked at number 18 on the Billboard Tropical Airplay chart. It also peaked at number 4 on the Monitor Latino's Dominican Republic chart.

"Solo Conmigo" is the seventh single. The music video was released on January 17, 2023. The song peaked at 40 on the Billboard Hot Latin Songs chart and at number 4 on the Billboard Tropical Airplay chart. It also peaked at number 7 on the Monitor Latino's Dominican Republic Bachata chart.

"Suegra" is the eighth single. The music video was released on March 3, 2023. The song peaked at number 17 on the Billboard Tropical Airplay chart. It also peaked at number 4 on the Monitor Latino's Dominican Republic Bachata chart. However, Suegra would be banned from radios stations in the Dominican Republic after politician and lawyer Víctor Pavón demanded that song be banned from local radio stations. He claimed that the song was promoting violence against women.

"Boomerang" is the ninth single. The music video was released on September 1, 2023.

=== Promo singles and other charted songs ===
"Culpable" is a promo single and features Dominican rapper Lápiz Conciente. The beat is from the song "I Got 5 on It" by Luniz featuring Michael Marshall. It peaked at number 5 on the Monitor Latino's Dominican Republic chart. The music video is set to release soon.

"15,500 Noches" features Dominican Merengue musicians Fernando Villalona, Rubby Pérez, Toño Rosario, and Ramón Orlando. The song peaked at number 13 on the Billboard Tropical Airplay chart. It also peaked at number 6 on the Monitor Latino's Dominican Republic Merengue chart.

"La Última Vez" features Dominican Bachata singer Luis Miguel Del Amargue. It peaked at number 10 on the Monitor Latino's Dominican Republic Bachata chart. It also featured the participation of Dominican DJ, DJ Adoni.

"Ayúdame" peaked at number 8 on the Billboard Tropical Airplay chart.

== Critical reception ==
Upon release, Formula, Vol. 3 received generally positive reviews from critics and fans alike. Amanda Alcantara from the Rolling Stone gave a positive review on an article titled Romeo Santos Is Both a Bachata Innovator and a Proud Traditionalist on 'Formula Vol. 3'. On the same note, Thaina Garcia from Variety gave a positive review to the album a highlights the collaborations and guest appearances. On the same week of the album release, fans vote Formula, Vol. 3 as the favorite new music of the week on Billboard website page. Also, Billboard staff ranked "Me extraño" with Christian Nodal as the best collaboration of the album.

On other hand, Isabelia Herrera from The New York Times gave a mixed review to the album and wrote an article titled Romeo Santos Reveals Another Volume of Boundary-Crossing Bachata. On the article she stated " soars when it expands the scope of the genre and the singer's own approaches to its trademarks, but falls flat when it relies on backward-looking tropes".

== Commercial performance ==
The album debuted at number 10 on the US Billboard 200 with 26,000 units for the week ending September 17, 2022. The figures includes 2,000 units of pure sales. It was the fourth top-10 charting effort for the artist on the list. In the same week, it reached number one US Tropical Albums, just like the previous two efforts of the trilogy Formula, Vol. 1 (2011) and Formula, Vol. 2 (2014). Also, it debut at number two on US Billboard Top Latin Albums.

On the weekend of September 2–4, 2022, the album earned "Top Global Album Debut" and "Top Album Debut" in the United States on Spotify. The album was certified gold in Peru.

== Track listing ==
Formula, Vol. 3 track listing
| No. | Title | Length |
|---|---|---|
| 1. | "Intro" (featuring Katt Williams, Valentino Santos, Solano Santos and Alex Santos) | 1:41 |
| 2. | "Bebo" | 3:55 |
| 3. | "Ayúdame" | 3:44 |
| 4. | "Boomerang" | 4:07 |
| 5. | "Sexo Con Ropa" | 3:06 |
| 6. | "Ciudadana" | 3:33 |
| 7. | "Mar" | 3:23 |
| 8. | "El Pañuelo" (with Rosalía) | 3:54 |
| 9. | "15,500 Noches" (with Fernando Villalona, Rubby Pérez and Toño Rosario) (featuring Ramón Orlando) | 4:31 |
| 10. | "Perro" | 3:33 |
| 11. | "Sin Fin" (with Justin Timberlake) | 3:54 |
| 12. | "Solo Conmigo" | 4:14 |
| 13. | "Sus Huellas" | 3:34 |
| 14. | "Siri" (with Chris Lebron) | 2:44 |
| 15. | "Skit" (with Johnny Marines and ChiChi) (featuring MateTraxx) | 3:50 |
| 16. | "Me Extraño" (with Christian Nodal) | 3:11 |
| 17. | "Suegra" | 3:44 |
| 18. | "Culpable" (with Lápiz Conciente) | 2:57 |
| 19. | "R.I.P" | 3:21 |
| 20. | "La Última Vez" (with Luis Miguel del Amargue) | 3:40 |
| 21. | "Nirvana" | 4:37 |
| Total length: | | 75:13 |

Notes

- "Skit" is written as: "Skit" (With a Special Character).

== Charts ==
=== Weekly charts ===
Weekly chart performance for Fórmula, Vol. 3
| Chart (2022) | Peak position |
|---|---|
| Belgian Albums (Ultratop Flanders) | 156 |
| Spanish Albums (Promusicae) | 6 |
| Swiss Albums (Schweizer Hitparade) | 12 |
| US Billboard 200 | 10 |
| US Top Latin Albums (Billboard) | 2 |
| US Tropical Albums (Billboard) | 1 |

=== Year-end charts ===
2022 year-end chart performance for Fórmula, Vol. 3
| Chart (2022) | Position |
|---|---|
| Spanish Albums (PROMUSICAE) | 76 |

2023 year-end chart performance for Fórmula, Vol. 3
| Chart (2023) | Position |
|---|---|
| Spanish Albums (PROMUSICAE) | 44 |

== Certifications ==
Certifications for Fórmula, Vol. 3
| Region | Certification | Certified units/sales |
|---|---|---|
| Mexico (AMPROFON) | Gold | 70,000^{‡} |
| Peru | Gold | |
| Spain (Promusicae) | Gold | 20,000^{‡} |
| United States (RIAA) | Diamond (Latin) | 600,000^{‡} |
^{‡} Sales+streaming figures based on certification alone.
