= Sus Huellas =

2022 single by Romeo Santos

Single by Romeo Santos

from the album Formula, Vol. 3
- Language: Spanish
- English title: "Her Prints"
- Released: February 14, 2022
- Genre: Bachata
- Length: 3:33
- Label: Sony Latin
- Songwriter: Romeo Santos

Romeo Santos singles chronology
"Fan De Tus Fotos" (2021)	"Sus Huellas" (2022)	"Sin Fin" (2022)

Music video
- "Sus Huellas" on YouTube

"Sus Huellas" ("Her Prints") is a song written and performed by American bachata singer Romeo Santos. It is the first single for his fifth studio album Formula, Vol. 3 (2022). It was released on Valentine's Day of 2022. This song contains metaphorical lyrics. It describes a person who is trying to forget a love from their past.

== Charts ==
Chart performance for "Sus Huellas"
Chart (2022)	Peak position
Colombia (Monitor Latino)	1
Costa Rica (Monitor Latino)	4
Dominican Republic Bachata Airplay (Monitor Latino)	1
Dominican Republic General Airplay (Monitor Latino)	5
Ecuador (Monitor Latino)	2
El Salvador (Monitor Latino)	2
Guatemala (Monitor Latino)	10
Paraguay (Monitor Latino)	18
Peru (Monitor Latino)	2
Puerto Rico (Monitor Latino)	1
Spain (PROMUSICAE)	100
Mexico Airplay (Billboard)	5
Mexico Popular Airplay (Billboard)	11
US Bubbling Under Hot 100 (Billboard)	5
US Hot Latin Songs (Billboard)	10
US Latin Airplay (Billboard)	1
US Tropical Airplay (Billboard)	1

== Certifications ==
Certifications for "Sus Huellas"
Region	Certification	Certified units/sales
Mexico (AMPROFON)	Gold	70,000^{‡}
Spain (Promusicae)	Gold	30,000^{‡}
United States (RIAA)	6× Platinum (Latin)	360,000^{‡}
^{‡} Sales+streaming figures based on certification alone.

== See also ==
- List of Billboard Hot Latin Songs and Latin Airplay number ones of 2022
- List of Billboard Tropical Airplay number ones of 2022
