= Lápiz Conciente =

Dominican rapper (born 1983)

Lapiz Conciente
- Lápiz Conciente in 2010

Background information
- Born: Avelino Junior Figueroa Rodríguez; 24 January 1983 (age 43); Los Mina, Dominican Republic
- Genres: Dembow; hip hop; Latin trap; reggaeton
- Occupation: Rapper
- Label: Sony Music Latin

Avelino Junior Figueroa Rodríguez (born 24 January 1983), known musically as Lápiz Conciente (Lit. "Conscious Pencil"), is a Dominican rapper. He is considered one of the pioneers of hip hop in the Dominican Republic. In 2013 he was nominated for the Premios Juventud, in the category My Urban Artist, In 2016, he was awarded at the Latin Music Italian Awards, and in 2017 was nominated for the Latin Grammy Awards for Latin Grammy Award for Best Urban Song, "Papa" in collaboration with Vico C. He was placed number forty-eight on the list of the "50 Greats in the History of Spanish-Language Rap" according to Rolling Stone.

== Early life ==
Figueroa was born on 24 January 1983, in the Maternity Ward (San Lorenzo de Los Mina Maternal and Child Hospital), Distrito Nacional. (Note: Los Mina was part of the Distrito Nacional until 2001.) He grew up in a dysfunctional family, where he was raised by his grandmother Paulina Rodríguez de Jesús "Palín", who was a housekeeper and nurse. Figueroa is older than his siblings, and his mother died at the age of 21. In 1993, Figueroa was inspired by American rapper Vico C, where he was introduced to hip hop music at the age of 10. He was named Lápiz Conciente after his grandmother's pronunciation, where Figueroa corrected his grandmother's spelling mistakes. Figueroa had 2 children with his partner of over ten years, Niurka. He studied accounting at Universidad Autónoma de Santo Domingo, without finishing it, and he is a devoted believer in God.

== Career ==
In 2008, Figueroa released the songs "Las Menores" on YouTube, including those from YouTube, and in 2009, the mixtape "Ráfaga de Plomo". In 2011, he participated in the single "Capea el Dough" in collaboration with Toxic Crow, and was considered representative of Hip hop in Dominican Republic, Later, he released his debut singles, "Yo Soy Papa," and the video "Yo No Te Quiero Perder," which garnered more than 39 million views on YouTube. In 2014 he received a Gold Record for his debut song "Si No Te Quisiera" in collaboration with Juan Magán and Belinda, and it has had 330 million views on YouTube.

In 2016 he released the album "Latidos", which includes collaborations with Vico C, Natti Natasha, Belinda, J Álvarez, Black Jonas Point, Musicologo El Libro. In 2016 he signed with Sony Music Latin where he released his second studio album "Cicatrices" under the record label Sony Music Latin debuting in record sales in the Dominican Republic and United States on digital platforms, including collaborations with Magic Juan, Nacho, Leslie Grace, Xaxo, El B, Negro HP.

In 2020, Figueroa held a rap battle against Dominican rapper Mozart La Para, where he premiered the singles "El Descanso Eterno", "Tú No Tá", and "9 Días". In 2022 he participated in the song "Culpable" from the studio album Formula, Vol. 3, by Romeo Santos.

== Awards and nominations ==
Award	Year	Category	Result
Premios Juventud – Latin Music Italian Awards – Latin Grammy Award for Best Urban Song	2013 2016 2017	Favorite Urban Artist - Best Latin Urban Song of The Year and My -Favorite Lyrics Best Urban Song	Nominated- Won – Nominated
