= El Pañuelo =

2022 single by Romeo Santos

Single by Romeo Santos and Rosalía

from the album Formula, Vol. 3
- Released: September 2, 2022
- Recorded: December 2021
- Genre: Bachata
- Length: 3:54
- Label: Sony Latin
- Songwriters: Anthony Santos; Rosalia Vila; Diego Ramón Jiménez; Alexander Caba; Joaquín Díaz; Ramon E. Jimenez
- Producers: Romeo Santos; Mate Traxx

Romeo Santos singles chronology
"Sin Fin" (2022)	"El Pañuelo" (2022)	"Bebo" (2022)

Rosalía singles chronology
"Despechá" (2022)	"El Pañuelo" (2022)	"Besos Moja2" (2022)

Music video
- "El Pañuelo" on YouTube

"El Pañuelo" (English: "The Handkerchief") is a song recorded by American singer Romeo Santos alongside Spanish singer and songwriter Rosalía. It was released on 2 September 2022 through Sony Latin as the third single of Santos' fifth studio album Formula, Vol. 3 (2022). The song, a bachata, was written and produced by both performers alongside Diego el Cigala, Alexander Caba, Joaquín Díaz and Ramón Jiménez. It samples and interpolates the 1985 track "No Sé Qué Hacer", performed by Carlos Manuel "El Zafiro".

== Chart performance ==
Commercially, "El Pañuelo" entered major market charts including the Global 200, and the Billboard Hot Latin Songs. It peaked at number seven on the PROMUSICAE chart in Spain.

== Music video ==
An accompanying music video for "El Pañuelo" filmed at an indoor studio in Los Angeles and produced by Canada and Park Pictures was shared on YouTube upon the record's release.

== Personnel ==
Production personnel

- Romeo Santos – production, lyrics, composition; vocals, vocal arrangement
- Rosalía Vila – lyrics, composition, vocal production; vocals, background vocals
- Mate Traxx – production, composition; drums, synthesizer
- Alexander Caba – composition; vocal arrangement: guitar
- Joaquín Díaz – composition; keyboards, piano, bass
- Juan Abel Martínez – guira, bongos
- Adán Gómez – bass
- Eric Rivera – guitar
- Isiah Parker – synthesizer

Technical personnel

- David Rodríguez – mixing
- Manny Marroquin – mixing
- Mate Traxx – assistant mix engineer
- Tom Brick – mastering

== Charts ==
Chart performance for "El Pañuelo"
Chart (2022–2023)	Peak position
Argentina Hot 100 (Billboard)	83
Dominican Republic (SodinPro)	19
Dominican Republic Bachata (Monitor Latino)	8
El Salvador (Monitor Latino)	6
Global 200 (Billboard)	134
Guatemala (Monitor Latino)	5
Mexico (Monitor Latino)	1
Peru (Monitor Latino)	13
Puerto Rico (Monitor Latino)	2
Spain (PROMUSICAE)	7
Spain (Billboard)	8
US Bubbling Under Hot 100 (Billboard)	23
US Hot Latin Songs (Billboard)	20
US Latin Airplay (Billboard)	1
US Tropical Airplay (Billboard)	1

== Certifications ==
Certifications for "El Pañuelo"
Region	Certification	Certified units/sales
Mexico (AMPROFON)	Gold	70,000^{‡}
Spain (Promusicae)	2× Platinum	120,000^{‡}
United States (RIAA)	3× Platinum (Latin)	180,000^{‡}
^{‡} Sales+streaming figures based on certification alone.

== Release history ==
Release history and formats for "El Pañuelo"
Region	Date	Format	Label
Various	2 September 2022	Digital download; streaming	Sony Latin
