= Sin Fin =

2022 single by Romeo Santos

Single by Romeo Santos and Justin Timberlake

from the album Formula, Vol. 3
- Language: Spanish; English
- English title: "Endless"
- Released: September 1, 2022
- Genre: Bachata
- Length: 3:54
- Label: Sony Latin
- Songwriters: Anthony Santos; Justin Timberlake; Floyd Nathaniel Hills; Richard Preston Butler; Alexander Caba
- Producers: Santos; Timberlake; Danja; Rico Love

Romeo Santos singles chronology
"Sus Huellas" (2022)	"Sin Fin" (2022)	"El Pañuelo" (2022)

Justin Timberlake singles chronology
"Stay With Me" (2022)	"Sin Fin" (2022)	"Keep Going Up" (2023)

Music video
- "Sin Fin" on YouTube

"Sin Fin" ("Endless") is a song written and performed by American singers Romeo Santos and Justin Timberlake. It is the second single for Santos' fifth studio album Formula, Vol. 3 (2022). Both the single and music video were released on September 1, 2022, on the same day as the album it is from. The music video on YouTube has received over 25 million views as of December 2024.

== Charts ==
Chart performance for "Sin Fin"
Chart (2022)	Peak position
Dominican Republic Bachata (Monitor Latino)	18
Puerto Rico (Monitor Latino)	1
Romania (Radiomonitor)	11
US Billboard Hot 100	100
US Hot Latin Songs (Billboard)	15
US Latin Airplay (Billboard)	1
US Tropical Airplay (Billboard)	1

== Certifications ==
Certifications for "Sin Fin"
Region	Certification	Certified units/sales
Spain (Promusicae)	Gold	30,000^{‡}
United States (RIAA)	3× Platinum (Latin)	180,000^{‡}
^{‡} Sales+streaming figures based on certification alone.
