= Iván Cornejo =

American singer-songwriter (born 2004)

- Born: June 5, 2004 (age 22); Riverside, California, U.S.
- Occupations: Singer; songwriter; guitarist
- Height: 5 ft 6 in (168 cm)
- Musical career
- Genres: Regional Mexican; alternative-indie; rock
- Instruments: Vocals; guitar
- Years active: 2020–present
- Labels: Manzana; Zaragoza; Interscope
- Website: ivancornejoofficial.com

Iván Cornejo (born June 5, 2004), is an American singer-songwriter in the regional Mexican genre.

Born and raised in Riverside, California, Cornejo self-taught himself guitar from age eight and posted covers of songs to his Instagram and TikTok accounts in his teenage years. At age 16, he began his music career with the single "Noche de Relajo". His debut album Alma Vacía released on August 20, 2021, which produced his viral hit "Está Dañada", all while he was aged 17. Cornejo has found continued success with his albums "Dañado" in 2022 and "Mirada" in 2024, both of which produced successful tours. In 2025, he became one of few Mexican arists to ever perform at the Coachella music festival.

Cornejo has redefined the Regional Mexican sound by fusing sierreño sounds (similar to those of artists Natanael Cano and Junior H) with indie and alternative rock sounds, which are present in most of his songs. His style has resonated with fans on a worldwide scale, but especially with Mexican youth and Hispanic youth in the United States.

== Early life ==
Cornejo was born in Riverside, California to Mexican parents on June 5, 2004. His father immigrated to the United States illegally, and was granted amnesty by president Ronald Reagan in 1986. He endured a breakup in middle school that provided inspiration for songwriting and taught himself how to play the guitar by watching tutorials on YouTube. The first song he learned was Ritchie Valens' version of "La Bamba". His earliest music inspirations include T3R Elemento, Grupo Los de la O and Natanael Cano.

== Career ==
Cornejo's debut album Alma Vacía peaked at number two on the US Billboard Regional Mexican Albums chart and number seven on the Top Latin Albums chart. The album sold 7,000 album-equivalent units and peaked at number 156 on the Billboard 200 chart. The album remained in the top ten of the Regional Mexican Albums chart for 35 weeks. His songwriting credits enabled him to peak atop the Billboard Latin Songwriters chart in the week ending October 30, 2021. Alma Vacía was named as one of the best albums of 2021 by The New York Times. The single "Está Dañada", went viral on TikTok in September 2021. It peaked at number 61 on the Billboard Hot 100 chart and was the second regional Mexican song to chart on the Hot 100. Billboard magazine included Cornejo in their Artist on the Rise column in October 2021.

His second studio album Dañado, debuted and peaked at number one on the Regional Mexican Albums chart in the week ending June 18, 2022. It spent a total of 37 weeks at number one, fourth highest since the chart's creation. The album sold 8,000 album-equivalent units, with 11.9 million on-demand streams of the album's songs, while it peaked at number four on the Top Latin Albums chart. The album also peaked at number 28 on the Billboard 200 chart. Cornejo has been nominated for New Regional Mexican Artist at the 2022 Premios Juventud. Cornejo's guitar solos in his songs include alternative rock influences, a genre his brother and mother often listened to during Cornejo's upbringing.

On July 28, 2023, Cornejo released the single "Aquí Te Espero", which peaked at number 89 on the Billboard Hot 100. He released "Dónde Estás" three months later.

On March 14, 2024, Cornejo released "Baby Please", which earned him his first top 10 on the US Hot Latin Songs chart, peaking at number eight, since 2021 when "Está Dañada" peaked at number two.

On June 18, 2024, Cornejo announced his third studio album Mirada. It was released on July 19, 2024, by Interscope and Zaragoza Records, his first for those labels.

In April 2025, Cornejo made his debut on the stage at Coachella 2025, previewing the setlist for his upcoming Mirada Tour Parte 2, and debuting his unreleased single "Me Prometí", which would be released soon after on May 2, 2025.

== Advocacy ==
In the aftermath of the 2025 Southern California Wildfires, Cornejo donated proceeds from his Mirada tour to the Los Angeles Fire Department Foundation.

On June 10, 2025, amid mass protests in Los Angeles against ICE, Cornejo released a statement posted to his Instagram profile, expressing support for immigrant families affected by ICE raids and condemnation towards the current administration (referring to U.S. president Donald Trump's second administration), mentioning that he was "speechless at the inhumanity that is affecting our Mexican and Hispanic communities". Cornejo also mentioned in this post that proceeds from his Mirada Tour Parte 2 were going to fund the Coalition for Humane Immigrant Rights of Los Angeles (CHIRLA), providing a link for his followers to learn more about the organization.

== Discography ==
=== Studio albums ===
List of studio albums, with selected details, and chart positions
Title	Details	Peak chart positions			Sales	Certifications
Title	Details	US	US Latin	US Reg. Mex.	Sales	Certifications
Alma Vacía	Released: August 20, 2021; Label: Manzana Records; Formats: Digital download, streaming	156	7	2		
Dañado	Released: June 2, 2022; Label: Manzana Records; Formats: Digital download, streaming	28	2	1		RIAA: 5× Platinum (Latin)
Mirada	Released: July 19, 2024; Label: Zaragoza, Interscope; Formats: Digital download, streaming	17	1	1	US: 9,000 (Note: United States first week sales figures for Mirada.)	

=== Singles ===
List of singles, with selected chart positions, and album name
Title	Year	Peak chart positions		Certifications	Album
Title	Year	US	US Latin	Certifications	Album
"Noche de Relajo"	2020	—	—		Alma Vacía
"Llamadas Perdidas"	2021	—	—		Alma Vacía
"Corazón Frío"	2021	—	—		Alma Vacía
"Está Dañada" (solo or remix with Jhayco)	2021	61	2	RIAA: 8× Platinum (Latin)	Alma Vacía
"El Greñas Mentado"	2021	—	—		Non album-single
"El de Houston"	2021	—	—		Non album-single
"Perro Abandonado"	2022	—	24		Dañado
"Triste"	2022	—	—		Non-album single
"J."	2022	— (Note: "J." did not enter the Billboard Hot 100, but peaked at number 21 on the Bubbling Under Hot 100 Singles chart.)	14		Dañado
"La Curiosidad" (with Eslabón Armado)	2022	— (Note: "La Curiosidad" did not enter the Billboard Hot 100, but peaked at number 16 on the Bubbling Under Hot 100 Singles chart.)	15		Dañado
"Inseparables" (with Yahritza y su Esencia)	2022	— (Note: "Inseparables" did not enter the Billboard Hot 100, but peaked at number five on the Bubbling Under Hot 100 Singles chart.)	17		Obsessed Pt. 2
"Aquí Te Espero"	2023	89	11		Mirada
"2ndo Chance" (with Becky G)	2023	—	34		Esquinas
"Dónde Estás"	2023	— (Note: "Dónde Estás" did not enter the Billboard Hot 100, but peaked at number seven on the Bubbling Under Hot 100 Singles chart.)	27		Mirada
"Baby Please"	2024	95	8		Mirada
"Intercambio Injusto"	2024	— (Note: "Intercambio Injusto" did not enter the Billboard Hot 100, but peaked at number 19 on the Bubbling Under Hot 100 Singles chart.)	7		Mirada
"Me Prometí"	2025	95	9		Non-album single

=== Other charted and certified songs ===
List of songs, with selected chart positions and certifications, showing year released and album name
Title	Year	Peak chart positions				Certifications	Album
Title	Year	MEX	US	US Latin	WW	Certifications	Album
"No Me Quise Ir"	2022	—	—	31	—		Dañado
"La Última Vez"	2022	—	— (Note: "La Última Vez" did not enter the Billboard Hot 100, but peaked at number 24 on the Bubbling Under Hot 100 chart.)	15	—		Dañado (Deluxe)
"Tatuajes"	2022	—	—	21	—		Dañado (Deluxe)
"Ya Te Perdí"	2022	—	—	17	—		Dañado (Deluxe)
"Mentiras" (with Grupo Los de la O)	2022	—	—	—	—	RIAA: 8× Platinum (Latin); AMPROFON: 2× Platinum	Pura Manzanita, Vol. 3
"Reloj" (with Peso Pluma)	2024	13	69	3	130		Éxodo
"Sale Para Ser Feliz"	2024	—	— (Note: "Sale Para Ser Feliz" did not enter the Billboard Hot 100, but peaked at number 24 on the Bubbling Under Hot 100 chart.)	9	—		Mirada
"Herida Abierta"	2024	—	—	21	—		Mirada
"Vuelve"	2024	—	—	23	—		Mirada
"Interlude"	2024	—	—	41	—		Mirada
"Quiero Dormir Cansado"	2024	—	—	38	—		Mirada
"Mirada"	2024	—	—	14	—		Mirada
"Atención"	2024	—	—	29	—		Mirada

== Awards and nominations ==
Awards and nominations for Iván Cornejo
Award	Year	Category	Nominated work	Result	Ref.
Billboard Latin Music Awards	2022	New Artist of the Year	Ivan Cornejo	Won	
Billboard Latin Music Awards	2022	Regional Mexican Artist of the Year, Solo	Ivan Cornejo	Nominated	
Billboard Latin Music Awards	2022	Regional Mexican Album of the Year	Alma Vacía	Won	
Billboard Latin Music Awards	2023	Top Latin Albums Artist of the Year, Male	Iván Cornejo	Nominated	
Billboard Latin Music Awards	2023	Regional Mexican Artist of the Year, Solo	Iván Cornejo	Nominated	
Billboard Latin Music Awards	2023	Top Latin Album of the Year	Dañado	Nominated	
Billboard Latin Music Awards	2023	Regional Mexican Album of the Year	Dañado	Won	
Latin American Music Awards	2021	New Artist of the Year	Ivan Cornejo	Nominated	
Latin American Music Awards	2021	Favorite Regional Mexican Album	Alma Vacía	Nominated	
Latin American Music Awards	2021	Viral Song of the Year	"Está Dañada"	Nominated	
Latin American Music Awards	2022	Artist of the Year	Ivan Cornejo	Nominated	
Latin American Music Awards	2022	Favorite Regional Mexican Artist	Ivan Cornejo	Nominated	
Latin American Music Awards	2022	Streaming Artist of the Year	Ivan Cornejo	Nominated	
Latin American Music Awards	2022	Song of the Year	"Está Dañada"	Nominated	
Latin American Music Awards	2022	Album of the Year	Dañado	Nominated	
Latin American Music Awards	2022	Favorite Regional Mexican Album	Dañado	Nominated	
Premios Juventud	2022	The New Generation – Regional Mexican	Ivan Cornejo	Nominated	
Premios Juventud	2022	Best Regional Mexican Fusion	"Está Dañada (Remix)" (with Jhayco)	Nominated	
Premios Juventud	2022	Regional Mexican Album of the Year	Alma Vacía	Nominated	
Premios Lo Nuestro	2023	Regional Mexican New Artist of the Year	Ivan Cornejo	Nominated	
Premios Tu Música Urbano	2022	Top Artist – Regional Mexican Urban	Ivan Cornejo	Nominated	
Premios Tu Música Urbano	2022	Top Song – Regional Mexican	"Está Dañada"	Nominated	

== Works cited ==
- Flores, Griselda (11 November 2021). "Latin Artist on the Rise: Meet Ivan Cornejo, The Latest Teen to Top the Regional Mexican Charts". Billboard.
- Bustios, Pamela (15 June 2022). "Ivan Cornejo Scores First No. 1 on Regional Mexican Albums Chart With 'Dañado'". Billboard.
- Pareles, Jon; Caramanica, Jon; Zoladz, Lindsay (2 December 2021). "Best Albums of 2021". The New York Times.
