= 27th Annual Latin Grammy Awards =

2026 music awards ceremony

27th Latin Grammy Awards
- Artwork by Argentine artist EXTi
- Date: November 12, 2026
- Venue: MGM Grand Garden Arena; Paradise, Nevada, United States
- Hosted by: Roselyn Sánchez

Highlights
- Most awards: Rosalía (5)
- Most nominations: Édgar Barrera (10)
- Person of the Year: Daddy Yankee

Television/radio coverage
- Network: Broadcast: Univision; Streaming: Vix; HBO Max

The 27th Annual Latin Grammy Awards ceremony was held on November 12, 2026, at the MGM Grand Garden Arena in Las Vegas. The awards honored the best recordings and compositions released between June 1, 2025, and May 31, 2026, as selected by the members of the Latin Recording Academy. Puerto Rican actress Roselyn Sánchez served as host for the tenth time.

Puerto Rican rapper and singer Daddy Yankee was announced as this year's Latin Recording Academy Person of the Year. Lifetime Achievement Awards will be presented to Spanish singer Alaska, Cuban musician Francisco Céspedes, Mexican singer-songwriter Lila Downs, Brazilian singer-songwriter Daniela Mercury, and Dominican musician Chichí Peralta. Panamanian singer-songwriter Omar Alfanno will receive the Trustee Award.

For the second time, American songwriter and producer Edgar Barrera led the nominations with ten, followed by Jorge Drexler, Rosalía, Karol G, and Ca7riel & Paco Amoroso, all with seven each. Other multiple nominees include Mon Laferte and Silvana Estrada, both with six nominations each, and Milo J with five.

== Performances ==
List of musical performances
Artist(s)	Song(s)
Premiere ceremony
Gusi; Jorge Celedón; Karen Lizarazo	"Son Para Ti" "Me Espera Algo Mejor" "El Valle es el Valle" "Sin Querer Queriendo"
Pablo Alborán	"Mis 36"
Marina Sena	"Coisas Naturais" "Lua Cheia" "Sai para Ver o Mar"
Kakalo	"Bien y Tú"
Carminho; Yerai Cortés	"Como Decían los Maestros"
Akapellah	"La Pena Deiby"
Main ceremony
Rosalía	"La Rumba del Perdón" "La Perla" "Dios es un Stalker"
Mon Laferte	"Femme Fatale"
Silvana Estrada	"Dime"
Kany García	"A la Niña Que Fui"
Anitta	"Ternura" "Desgraça" "Choka Choka" "Meia Noite"
Karol G	"Ese Hombre es Malo"
Jorge Drexler	"Las Palabras"
Daddy Yankee; Bizarrap; French Montana; Bad Gyal; Feid; Diljit Dosanjh; Jay Wheeler; LL Cool J	"Daddy Yankee: Bzrp Music Sessions, Vol. 0/66" "Ella Me Levantó" "Con Calma" "Dura" "BOTZ" "Despacito" "Lo Que Pasó, Pasó" "Sonríele" "Pokito" "Mama Said Knock You Out" "Gasolina"
Edgar Barrera; The Warning; Reik; Sofía Reyes; Yami Safdie; Camila Fernández	"Te Solté la Rienda" "La Media Vuelta" "Si Nos Dejan" "El Rey"
Milo J Agarrate Catalina; Gustavo Santaolalla	"Solifican12" "Gil"
Carín León; Juanes; Vivir Quintana	"Desde Que Te Tengo" "Humano"
Elena Rose	"Alma"
Camila Fernández	"Serpiente de Cascabel"
Niña Pastori; Fonseca; Miguel Colón; Ángel "Cucco" Peña; Nathy Peluso; Luis Enrique; Grupo Niche	"Oh Qué Sera?" "Idilio" "Usted Abusó" "El Gran Varón" "La Murga"
Rawayana	"Bendito" "Inglés en Miami" "Qué Rico PR!" "Conga"
Grupo Frontera	"Coqueta" "Ojitos Bellos"
Feid; Divino; Lil Supa; Baby Ranks; DJ Premier	"Se Puso Feo" "Poder" "Se Lo Juro Mor"
Xavi	"Dosis" "No Capea"
Banda Los Recoditos	"Zúmbale"

== Presenters ==
=== Premiere ceremony ===
- Daniela Mercury, Lila Downs and Niña Pastori (hosts)
- Manuel Loren and Joaquina
- Leiva and Francisca Valenzuela
- Sarai Rivera and Ferrugem
- Julieta Rada and Mercedes Luján
- Zaynara and Rivs
- Sofi Saar and Leoni Torres
- Alex Zurdo and Paty Cantú

=== Main ceremony ===
- Pablo Alborán and Howie Dorough – presented Best Pop/Rock Album
- Debi Nova and Roselyn Sánchez – introduced Mon Laferte, Silvana Estrada and Kany García
- Daniela Mercury and Roselyn Sánchez – introduced Anitta
- Marina Sena – presented Best Contemporary Mexican Music Album
- Ryan Castro and William Contreras – presented Best Contemporary Tropical Album
- Joaquina – presented Best New Artist
- Memo Ochoa and Roselyn Sánchez – introduced the tribute to José Alfredo Jiménez
- Anthony Ramos – presented Best Urban Music Album
- Greeicy and Trueno – introduced Carín León, Vivir Quintana and Juanes, presented Best Portuguese Language Contemporary Pop Album and introduced Elena Rose
- Lila Downs and Sara Schell – presented Song of the Year
- Janet Jackson – presented Person of the Year
- Camila Cabello – presented Record of the Year and introduced Grupo Frontera
- Juanes – presented Album of the Year

== Winners and nominees ==
The nominations were announced on September 16, 2026. Past winners Aitana, Renee, Camilo Sanabria, BaianaSystem, César Orozco, Paloma Morphy, Luis Enrique, Eduardo Cabra, Liniker, Jorge Drexler, Natalia Lafourcade, and Nico Cotton, all revealed the nominees in a livestream on the official Latin Grammy X account.

Winners appear first and are highlighted in bold.

=== General Field ===
General Field
**Record of the Year**
- **"Niño" – Milo J**
  - **Santiago Alvarado, Milo J & Santiago Ruiz "Tatool", record producers; Luciano Nicolas Gordillo, recording engineer; Jon Castelli, mixer; Dale Becker, mastering engineer**
- "Ha Ha" – Ca7riel & Paco Amoroso
  - Rafa Arcaute & Federico Vindver, record producers; Julio Gómez, recording engineer; Lewis Pickett, mixer; Lewis Pickett, mastering engineer
- "¿Como Se Ama?" – Jorge Drexler
  - Facundo Balta, Jorge Drexler, Mauro, Lucas Piedra Cueva & Tadu Vázquez, record producers; Lucas Piedra Cueva, recording engineer; Carles Campi Campón, mixer; Fred Kevorkian, mastering engineer
- "Dime" – Silvana Estrada
  - Daniel Bitrán Arizpe, Edwin Erazo & Silvana Estrada, record producers; Pietro Amato, Daniel Bitrán Arizpe, Leonel Carmona, Nic Hard, Warren Spicer & J.C. Vertti, recording engineers; Daniel Bitrán Arizpe, mixer; Ryan K. Smith, mastering engineer
- "O Amor Nos Encontrou" – Loulu Gilberto
  - Mario Adnet & Cézar Mendes, record producers; Lucas Ariel & Gabriel Pinheiro, recording engineers; Gabriel Pinheiro, mixer; David Darlington, mastering engineer
- "Coleccionando Heridas" – Karol G & Marco Antonio Solís
  - Edgar Barrera & Luis Miguel Gómez Castaño, record producers; Edgar Barrera, Joel Iglesias & José "Pepe" Melena, recording engineers; Josh Gudwin & Joel Iglesias, mixers; Dave Kutch, mastering engineer
- "Femme Fatale" – Mon Laferte
  - Manú Jalil & Mon Laferte, record producers; Isaí Araujo, Daniel Bitrán, Lu Garibay, Manú Jalil, Israel Rodriguez-Martinez, Nacho Sotelo & Jorge Valdés, recording engineers; Nacho Sotelo, mixer; Nacho Sotelo, mastering engineer
- "Desde Que Te Tengo" – Carín León
  - Israel Aispuro Meneses & Orlando Aispuro Meneses, record producers; Orlando Aispuro Meneses, Alberto Medina, Abraham Eduardo Tapia García & Antonio Zepeda, recording engineers; Alberto Medina, mixer; Alberto Medina, mastering engineer
- "La Perla" – Rosalía featuring Yahritza y Su Esencia
  - Noah Goldstein, David Rodríguez, Rosalía & Dylan Wiggins, record producers; Daniel Cayotte, Isaac Diskin, Tristan Hoogland, Jake Miller, David Rodríguez & Harry Wilson, recording engineers; Manny Marroquin, mixer; Bob Jackson & Brian Lee, mastering engineers
- "Alma" – Elena Rose
  - Daramola & Héctor Mazzarri, record producers; Daramola & Héctor Mazzarri, recording engineers; Leandro "Dro" Hidalgo, mixer; Leandro "Dro" Hidalgo, mastering engineer
**Album of the Year**
- **Lux (Complete Works) – Rosalía**
  - **Noah Goldstein, David Rodríguez, Rosalía & Dylan Wiggins, album producers; Daniel Cayotte, Isaac Diskin, Tristan Hoogland, Jake Miller, David Rodríguez & Harry Wilson, album recording engineers; Manny Marroquin, album mixer; Noah Goldstein, David Rodríguez, Rosalía & Dylan Wiggins, songwriters; Bob Jackson & Brian Lee, album mastering engineers**
- Equilibrivm – Anitta
  - Jean Rodriguez, album producer; Raphael Rui Castro, album recording engineer; Rafael Fadul, Marcelinho Ferraz, Arthur Luna, Jean Rodriguez & Luciano Scalercio, album mixers; Anitta, Carolina Marcilio, Jennifer Mosello & Cinthya Ribeiro Dos Santos, songwriters; Felipe Tichauer, album mastering engineer
- Free Spirits – Ca7riel & Paco Amoroso
  - Rafa Arcaute & Federico Vindver, album producers; Rafa Arcaute, Julio Gómez & Federico Vindver, album recording engineers; Lewis Pickett, album mixer; Rafa Arcaute, Gino Borri, Ca7riel & Paco Amoroso, Vicente Jimenez "Vibarco" & Federico Vindver, songwriters; Lewis Pickett, album mastering engineer
- Taracá – Jorge Drexler
  - Facundo Balta, Jorge Drexler, Mauro, Lucas Piedra Cueva & Tadu Vázquez, album producers; Lucas Piedra Cueva, album recording engineer; Carles Campi Campón, album mixer; Jorge Drexler & Mauro, songwriters; Fred Kevorkian, album mastering engineer
- Vendrán Suaves Lluvias – Silvana Estrada
  - Daniel Bitran Arizpe, Edwin Erazo & Silvana Estrada, album producers; Daniel Bitran Arizpe, Leonel Carmona, Warren Spicer & JC Vertti, album recording engineers; Daniel Bitran Arizpe, album mixer; Silvana Estrada, songwriter; Ryan Smith, album mastering engineer
- Tropicoqueta – Karol G
  - Edgar Barrera & Karol G, album producers; Edgar Barrera & Joel Iglesias, album recording engineers; Josh Gudwin & Joel Iglesias, album mixers; Edgar Barrera, Andrés Jael Correa Ríos & Karol G, songwriters; Dave Kutch, album mastering engineer
- Femme Fatale – Mon Laferte
  - Manú Jalil & Mon Laferte, album producers; Sebastián Aracena, Isaí Araujo, Manú Jalil, Nacho Sotelo & Jorge Valdés, album recording engineers; Nacho Sotelo, album mixer; Mon Laferte, songwriter; Nacho Sotelo, album mastering engineer
- Muda – Carín León
  - Edgar Barrera & Luis Miguel Gómez Castaño, album producers; Edgar Barrera, Luis Miguel Gómez Castaño, Alberto Medina, Abraham Eduardo Tapia García & Antonio Zepeda, album recording engineers; Alberto Medina, album mixer; Edgar Barrera, Andrés Jael Correa Ríos, Luis Miguel Gómez Castaño, Carín León, Manuel Lorente Freire & Daniel Rondón, songwriters; Alberto Medina, album mastering engineer
- La Vida Era Más Corta – Milo J
  - Santiago Alvarado, Milo J & Santiago Ruiz, album producers; Luciano Nicolas Gordillo, album recording engineer; Jon Castelli, album mixer; Santiago Alvarado, Milo J & Santiago Ruiz, songwriters; Dale Becker, album mastering engineer
- ¿Dónde es el After? – Rawayana
  - Luis Miguel Gómez Castaño, Héctor Mazzarri & Andrés Story, album producers; Adam Burt, Felix Byrne, Luis Miguel Gómez Castaño, Katie Harvey, Héctor Mazzarri & Andrés Story, album recording engineers; Josh Gudwin, album mixer; Alejandro Abeijón, Luis Miguel Gómez Castaño, Héctor Mazzarri, Alberto Montenegro, Daniel Rondón & Andrés Story, songwriters; Dale Becker, album mastering engineer
**Song of the Year**
- **"La Perla" – Noah Goldstein, David Rodríguez, Rosalía, Ryan Tedder & Dylan Wiggins, songwriters (Rosalía featuring Yahritza y Su Esencia)**
  - "Coleccionando Heridas" – Edgar Barrera, Kevyn Mauricio Cruz, Luis Miguel óomez Castaño & Karol G, songwriters (Karol G & Marco Antonio Solís)
  - "¿Como Se Ama?" – Jorge Drexler & Mauro, songwriters (Jorge Drexler)
  - "Dime" – Silvana Estrada, songwriter (Silvana Estrada)
  - "Femme Fatale" – Mon Laferte, songwriter (Mon Laferte)
  - "Hasta Jesús Tuvo un Mal Día" – Rafa Arcaute, Renee Barri, Ca7riel & Paco Amoroso, Vicente Jimenez “Vibarco”, Martin Kierszenbaum, John Ryan, Gordon Matthew Thomas Sumner & Federico Vindver, songwriters (Ca7riel & Paco Amoroso featuring Sting)
  - "Humano" – Emmanuel Briceño, Juanes, Felipe Navia & Vivir Quintana, songwriters (Juanes & Vivir Quintana)
  - "Mi Gran Amor" – Edgar Barrera, Becky G, Luis Miguel Gómez Castaño, Manuel Lorente, Daniel Rondón & Carlos Santana, songwriters (Santana featuring Becky G)
  - "Nilo" – Massimo Giovanardi & Zanna, songwriters (Zanna)
  - "Solifican12" – Santiago Alvarado, Milo J & Santiago Ruiz, songwriters (Milo J)
**Best New Artist**
- **Aria Vega**
  - Delilah
  - Fabian
  - Loulu Gilberto
  - Arath Herce
  - Macario Martínez
  - Maye
  - Sofia Monroy
  - Kendall Peña
  - Dora Sanches
  - Zeca Veloso

=== Pop ===
**Best Contemporary Pop Album**: **¿Y Ahora Qué +? – Alejandro Sanz**; KM0 – Pablo Alborán; Instrucciones Para Ser Feliz – Monsieur Periné; (Enamorada) – nic; Todo Puede Convertirse en Canción – Debi Nova	**Best Traditional Pop Album**: **Yo Canto 2 – Laura Pausini**; Amorío – Esteman & Daniela Spalla; Puerta Abierta – Kany García; TQ+ – Reik; Querida Yo – Yami Safdie
**Best Pop Song**: **"La Perla" – Noah Goldstein, David Rodríguez, Rosalía, Ryan Tedder & Dylan Wiggins, songwriters (Rosalía featuring Yahritza y Su Esencia)**; "A la Niña Que Fui" – Rafa Arcaute, Nate Campany, Kany García, Richi López & Sara Schell, songwriters (Kany García); "Amarillo" – Joaquina, songwriter (Joaquina); "(favorito)" – nic & Raquel Sofía, songwriters (nic); "Melancolía" – Mon Laferte, songwriter (Mon Laferte)

=== Electronic ===
**Best Electronic Music Performance**
- **"Beto’s Horns" (Fred Remix) – Ca7riel & Paco Amoroso & Fred Again..**
  - "Armándola de Pedo" – Kinky
  - "Circular" – Peces Raros featuring Nick Warren
  - "Motopirueta" – Soucream & Mazzarri
  - "III. Ojalá!" (Bronquio Remix) – Violeta & Bronquio

=== Urban ===
Irban Field
**Best Urban Performance**: **"Gil" – Milo J featuring Trueno**; "Daddy Yankee: Bzrp Music Sessions, Vol. 0/66" – Bizarrap & Daddy Yankee; "La Villa" – Ryan Castro, Kapo & Gangsta; "Se Lo Juro Mor" – Feid; "Dile Luna" – Karol G featuring Eddy Lover	**Best Reggaeton Performance**: **"Verano Rosa" – Karol G featuring Feid**; "Contrabando" – Rauw Alejandro, Wisin & Ñengo Flow; "Choque" – Bad Gyal featuring Chencho Corleone; "Una Aventura" – Ozuna; "Uñas Afiladas" – Sofía Reyes & Luísa Sonza
**Best Urban Music Album**: **Tropicoqueta – Karol G**; Más Cara – Bad Gyal; Omerta – J Balvin & Ryan Castro; Borondo (5020 Rcrds Sessions) – Beéle; Do Not Disturb: Late Checkout – Young Miko	**Best Rap/Hip Hop Song**: **"Antisistema" – J Noa & Trooko, songwriters (J Noa & Trooko)**; "El Pana Deiby" – Akapellah, Farlin Rafael Alonzo Flete & Melony Nathalie Redondo, songwriters (Akapellah); "Gohan y Goku" – Arcángel, songwriter (Arcángel); "Mono" – Kase.O, Okeiflou & Tokischa, songwriters (Tokischa & Kase.O); "Poder" – Feid & Lil Supa, songwriters (Lil Supa, Feid & Tru Comers)
**Best Urban Song**: **"Daddy Yankee: Bzrp Music Sessions, Vol. 0/66" – Santiago Alvarado, Bizarrap & Daddy Yankee, songwriters (Bizarrap & Daddy Yankee)**; "Buenos Términos" – Rauw Alejandro, René Basabe, Javier Cortes del Peso, Eduardo Puche, Miguel Puche, Nino K. Segarra & Daniel Silva de Sousa, songwriters (Rauw Alejandro); "Por Si Mañana No Estoy" – Omar Courtz, songwriter (Omar Courtz); "Reliquia Do 2T" – DJ GU, MC Dkziin, MC FR da Norte, MC Joãozinho VT, MC Tuto & MC Vine7, songwriters (Various artists); "Yo y Tú" – Beéle, Kevyn Mauricio Cruz "Keityn", Diego Leon Vélez, Ovy on the Drums, Quevedo & Cristian Andrés Salazar, songwriters (Ovy on the Drums, Quevedo & Beéle)

=== Rock ===
Rock Field
**Best Rock Album**: **Shine – Fito Páez**; A la Mitad – Beta; Malicia – Mägo de Oz; Ceremonia – 1915; La Frontera – Viniloversus	**Best Rock Song**: **"Ego" – Anton Curtis Delost, Mónica Vélez Domínguez, Niko Rubio, Alejandra Villarreal, Daniela Villarreal & Paulina Villarreal, songwriters (The Warning)**; "Destruirse" – Juan Victor Belisario, Rodrigo Gonsalves, Orlando Martinez & Emerson Swinford, songwriters (Viniloversus); "Las Fuerzas Armadas del Amor" – Fito Páez, songwriter (Fito Páez); "Montserrat" – Draco Rosa, songwriter (Draco Rosa); "Rojo Profundo" – Dillom, Franco Dolzani, Eugenio García Carlés & Fermín Ugarte, songwriters (Dillom)
**Best Pop/Rock Album**: **Juanesteban – Juanes**; Mi Año Gótico – Emmanuel Horvilleur; Tierra de Nadie – La Vida Bohème; Olas de Luz – Draco Rosa; Términos & Condiciones – Usted Señalemelo	**Best Pop/Rock Song**: **"Hasta Jesús Tuvo un Mal Día" – Rafa Arcaute, Renee Barri, Ca7riel & Paco Amoroso, Vicente Jimenez, Martin Kierszenbaum, John Ryan, Gordon Matthew Thomas Sumner & Federico Vindver, songwriters (Ca7riel & Paco Amoroso featuring Sting)**; "Antes de Que el Mundo Se Acabe" – Paty Cantú, Oscar Manuel Domínguez Montañez, Miguel Ángel Mendoza Arana & Fátima Carolina Valdez Lira, songwriters (Paty Cantú); "Hasta Que Me Quede Sin Voz" – Leiva, songwriter (Leiva); "Me Levanté de la Cama" – Arath Herce Blanco, songwriter (Arath Herce); "Ratera" – Bruses & Luis Javier Contreras, songwriters (Bruse)

=== Alternative ===
Alternative Field
**Best Alternative Music Album**: **Lux (Complete Works) – Rosalía**; Cuerpos, Vol. 1 – Babasonicos; Desde el Coma – Bruses; Free Spirits – Ca7riel & Paco Amoroso; Demian – Teo Planell	**Best Alternative Song**: **"Ante la Duda, Baila" – Ben Aler, Carlos Casacuberta, Jorge Drexler, Manuel Lorente Freire "Spread Lof", Gabriel Lugo "Gabo", Jesús Martos Castillo "Presser", Mauro, Alberto Montenegro "Beto", PJ Sin Suela, Andrés Story & Mateo Sujatovich, songwriters (Jorge Drexler)**; "Bugambilia" – Francisca Valenzuela & Francisco Victoria, songwriters (Francisca Valenzuela); "El Reset" – Dante Spinetta, songwriter (Dante Spinetta); "Querida Amalia" – Bruses, Alex Goose & Mauro Munoz, songwriters (Bruses); "1:30" – Aarón Cruz, Mon Laferte, Gabriel Puentes & Emilio Reyna, songwriters (Mon Laferte)

=== Tropical ===
Tropical Field
**Best Salsa Album**: **El Alma en Clave – Luis Enrique**; Invicto – Charlie Cruz; El Relevo – Luis Figueroa; Más Que Palabras – Grupo Niche; Malportada – Nathy Peluso	**Best Cumbia/Vallenato Album**: **El Último Disco Vol. 1 – Carlos Vives**; Jorgito – Jorge Celedón & Víctor Nain Jr.; Vallenato Social Club – Gusi; Corazón Ausente – Ke Personajes; El Tiempo Perfecto – Karen Lizarazo
**Best Merengue/Bachata Album**: **Chula – Techy**; Música Para Bailar – Fariana; Todo Llega – Manerra; No Era el Plan – Gabriel Pagán; Oye Eta Vaina – Covi Quintana	**Best Traditional Tropical Album**: **Íntimo (En Vivo) – Gilberto Santa Rosa**; Algo Nuevo de Ayer – Dayhan Díaz; Orgánico – Los Tri-O; Eternamente Omara – Omara Portuondo; Cualquiera Se Enamora – Leoni Torres
**Best Contemporary Tropical Album**: **Antes Que el Tiempo Se Vaya – Fonseca**; De Amor, Sueños y Cantares – Jorge Luis Chacín; Índole – Alex Cuba; Candela – Greeicy; Color Fania – Niña Pastori	**Best Tropical Song**: **"Nombre y Apellido" – Luis Enrique, Ender Thomas & Leon Yamil, songwriters (Luis Enrique & De la Ghetto)**; **"Realidad-Es" – José Aguirre, songwriter (Grupo Niche)**; "Crayola" – Manuel Lara, Eddy Lugo, Danny Ocean, Daniel Rondon & Eudis Ruiz, songwriters (Danny Ocean); "Latino" – Yeisy Rojas, songwriter (Yeisy Rojas featuring Manolito Simonet & Ricardo Amaray); "Todo Llega" – Manerra, songwriter (Manerra)

=== Singer-Songwriter ===
**Best Singer-Songwriter Album**: **Taracá – Jorge Drexler**; Improviso – Djavan; Vendrán Suaves Lluvias – Silvana Estrada; Musas en Mi – Arath Herce; Femme Fatale – Mon Laferte	**Best Singer-Songwriter Song**: **"Dime" – Silvana Estrada, songwriter (Silvana Estrada)**; "generación digital" – Joaquina, songwriter (Joaquina); "Las Palabras" – Jorge Drexler, songwriter (Jorge Drexler); "Musas en Mi" – Arath Herce, songwriter (Arath Herce); "Temblor y Réplica" – Covi Quintana, songwriter (Covi Quintana)

=== Regional-Mexican ===
Field
**Best Ranchero/Mariachi Album**: **La Fernández – Camila Fernández**; Mi Suerte es Ser Mexicano II – Pepe Aguilar; La Voz de Mi Trompeta (50 Años) – Mariachi Sol de José Hernández; Bandera Blanca – Christian Nodal	**Best Banda Album**: **Piedras a la Luna – Edén Muñoz**; Tequila y Guaro – Luis Ángel "El Flaco"; Piratita – Banda Los Recoditos
**Best Tejano Album**: **Bobby Pulido & Friends Una Tuya y Una Mía (Vol.2/En Vivo) – Bobby Pulido**; Mi Gran Noche - Raphael en la Voz de Kevin Aguilar – Kevin Aguilar; 3 – Destiny Navaira; Le Seguiremos – Jay Pérez; Capítulo 8 – Vilax	**Best Norteño Album**: **Lo Que Me Falta Por Llorar – Grupo Frontera**; El Mundo es del Que Se Anima – Calibre 50; Gravedad – Duelo; Mis Compas Vol. 2 – Joss Favela; 50/50 – Sofi Saar
**Best Contemporary Mexican Music Album**: **Dosis – Xavi**; De Parte Mía – Kakalo; Dinastía (Deluxe) – Peso Pluma & Tito Double P; Contra Todo – Rivs; Metamorfosis – Yahritza y Su Esencia	**Best Regional Mexican Song**: **"No Capea" – Edgar Barrera, Iván Gámez, Fabio Iván Gutiérrez Ramírez, Joshua Xavier Gutiérrez, Luis Mexia & Adelaido "Payo" Solís III, songwriters (Xavi & Grupo Frontera)**; "Ese Hombre es Malo" – Edgar Barrera, Andrés Jael Correa Ríos & Karol G, songwriters (Karol G); "Estamos Todos" – Johnny Lee Rosas, Ricardo Javier Muñoz & Pablo Preciado Rojas, songwriters (Intocable); "Ojitos Bellos" – Miguel Armenta, Edgar Barrera, Ivan Gámez & Alex Hernández, songwriters (Grupo Frontera); "Osadía" – Edén Muñoz, songwriter (Edén Muñoz & Cristian Castro)

=== Instrumental ===
**Best Instrumental Album**
- **A Tribute to Benny Moré and Nat King Cole – Gonzalo Rubalcaba, Joey Calveiro & Yainer Horta**
  - Peregrino – Yamandú Costa & Hermanos Saboya
  - Nova – Hamilton de Holanda featuring Salomão Soares & Thiago Big Rabello
  - Obra Viva de Hermeto Pascoal – Vol 1: Flautas – Andrea Ernest Dias, Aline Gonçalves, Eduardo Neves & Carlos Malta
  - La Huella de las Cuerdas – Berta Rojas

=== Traditional ===
Traditional Field
**Best Folk Album**: **La Vida Era Más Corta – Milo J**; Concierto de Gala (Desde El Gran Teatro Nacional) (Versión Eva) – Eva Ayllón; La Quinta Esencia – Yamandu Costa, Alexis Cárdenas & Ensemble Recoveco; Cambias Mi Mundo – Lila Downs; Candombe (En Vivo, Teatro Solís) – Julieta Rada	**Best Tango Album**: **Le Grand Tango – Quinteto Astor Piazzolla**; Neopía – Anibal Berraute; Somos – Lidia Borda & Ariel Ardit; Fueyerías – Pablo Jaurena; Revolucionario Filarmónico – Quinteto Revolucionario & Orquesta Filarmónica Juvenil de Bogotá
**Best Flamenco Album**: **Popular – Yerai Cortés**; Origen & Revolución – Mercedes Luján; In Illo Tempore – Mayte Martín; José Mercé Canta a Manuel Alejandro – José Mercé	**Best Roots Song**: **"El Tambor Chico" – Facundo Balta & Jorge Drexler, songwriters (Jorge Drexler & Rueda de Candombe)**; "El Alma Mía" – Silvana Estrada, songwriter (Silvana Estrada); "La Puñalá" – Andre & Nuria Azzouzi Idrissi Ghoziel, songwriters (Andre); "Spiritual Energies" – Eli Alvarado, songwriter (Eli Alvarado); "Urano" – Nathasha Bravo & Jorge Glem, songwriters (Nathasha Bravo, Jorge Glem & Elvis Martínez)

=== Jazz ===
**Best Latin Jazz/Jazz Album**
- **Gonzalo Plays Pino – Gonzalo Rubalcaba**
  - Folklore – Caracas Trio
  - Paco de Lucia Music for Big Band – Alex Conde
  - Verve – Lívia Mattos
  - Vanguardia Subterránea: Live at The Village Vanguard – Miguel Zenón Quartet

=== Christian ===
**Best Christian Album (Spanish Language)**: **Eterno – Marcos Witt, Marco Barrientos & Marcos Vidal**; Tú – Hakuna Group Music; Días Contigo – Majo y Dan; Inquebrantable – Sarai Rivera; Mayday – Alex Zurdo	**Best Christian Album (Portuguese Language)**: **Betel (Ao Vivo) – Eli Soares**; Primeiro (Ao Vivo) – Ziza Fernandes; Avenida do Arrependimento – Thalles Roberto; O Que Atravessa o Peito – Verboemcarne; Shuv – Victin

=== Portuguese-Language ===
Portuguese Language Field
**Best Portuguese Language Contemporary Pop Album**: **Equilibrivm – Anitta**; Ludom – Ludom; Antes Que a Terra Acabe – Luedji Luna; BRava – Jenni Mosello; MARINADA vol.01 – Marina Sena	**Best Portuguese Language Rock or Alternative Album**: **Carranca – Urias**; Resistência! Ao Vivo no Circo Voador – Black Pantera; Let It Burn / Deixa Arder – Chico Chico; Rádio Love Nacional – Detonautas; foto em grupo – Foto em Grupo
**Best Portuguese Language Urban Album**: **Emicida Racional VL 2 - Mesmas Cores & Mesmos Valores – Emicida**; Novo Testamento – Ajulliacosta; Frequência Lunar – Budah; CARO Vapor II – qual a forma de pagamento? – Don L; Terra Vermelha: Do interior pro interior – Matuto S.A.	**Best Samba/Pagode Album**: **50 Anos de Carreira – Leci Brandão**; Jessé - As canções de Zeca Pagodinho – Teresa Cristina; Nos Braços do Povo, Vol 2 (Ao Vivo) – Xande de Pilares; Sentimento – Ferrugem; Quinhão – Mosquito
**Best MPB (Musica Popular Brasileira)/MAPB (Música Afro Portuguesa Brasileira) Album**: **Criolo, Amaro e Dino – Criolo, Amaro Freitas & Dino D'Santiago**; Vende-se Lembrança – Pedro Emílio; Améfrica – Bia Ferreira; Afim – Zé Ibarra; Eita – Lenine	**Best Sertaneja Music Album**: **Raiz BH (Ao Vivo / Deluxe) – Lauana Prado**; Fire Arena – Ana Castela; Cantando Sua História 2 (Ao Vivo) – Simone Mendes; Registro Histórico (Ao Vivo) – Luan Santana; Traia Acústico (Ao Vivo) – Traia Véia
**Best Portuguese Language Roots Album**: **Dominguinho Vol. 2 (Ao Vivo) – João Gomes, Mestrinho & Jota.pê**; Eu Vou Morrer de Amor ou Resistir – Carminho; Até Cansar o Cansaço – Juliana Linhares; Molho Lambão – Psirico; Amor Perene – Zaynara	**Best Portuguese Language Song**: **"Viver e Morrer de Amor Na América Latina" – Johnny Hooker, songwriter (Johnny Hooker & Ney Matogrosso)**; "Águas de um Mar Azul" – Fábio & Hyldon, songwriters (Urias); "Memória" – Carminho, Noah Goldstein, Armando Machado, Rosalía & Dylan Wiggins, songwriters (Rosalía & Carminho); "No Vento de Nós" – Djodje Almeida, Criolo, Dino D'Santiago & Amaro Freitas, songwriters (Criolo, Amaro Freitas & Dino D'Santiago); "Sua Onda" – Arnaldo Antunes, Carlinhos Brown & Marisa Monte, songwriters (Marisa Monte)

=== Children's ===
**Best Children's Album**
- **Mil Secretos – Cantoalegre & Marta Gómez**
  - ¡A Jugar! – Danilo & Chapis
  - Mardearena – Magdalena Fleitas
  - Aprendo Jugando – OTA El Hipopotamo
  - Dinosaurios: Una Travesía Cretácica – Tu Rockcito

=== Classical ===
Classical and Arrangement Fields
**Best Classical Album**
- **Odyssey**
  - **Gustavo Dudamel, conductor; Dmitriy Lipay, album producer (Simón Bolívar Symphony Orchestra of Venezuela)**
- Gabriela Ortiz: Yanga
  - Alisa Weilerstein; Gustavo Dudamel, conductor; Dmitriy Lipay, album producer (Los Angeles Philharmonic)
- Opus 33 "Romantic Cello"
  - Gregorio Nieto; Josep Vicent, conductor; Fernando Arias, album producer (London Symphony Orchestra)
- Sinfonia em Quadrinhos
  - Hermeto Pascoal; Tiago Costa, conductor; Tiago Gomes, album producer (Orquestra Jovem Tom Jobim)
- Tania León: Horizons, Raíces (Origins), Stride, Pasajes
  - Dima Slobodeniouk; Karina Canellakis, Edward Gardner & Dima Slobodeniouk, conductors; Tim Burton, Nick Parker & Andrew Walton, album producers (London Philharmonic Orchestra)
**Best Classical Composition**
- **"Adagio de las Tres y Diez (for Bandoneón & String Orchestra)"**
  - **Richard Scofano, composer (Richard Scofano)**
- "Odisea: Concerto for Venezuelan Cuatro and Orchestra"
  - Gonzalo Grau, composer (Gustavo Dudamel, Simón Bolívar Symphony Orchestra of Venezuela & Jorge Glem)
- "Raices (Origins) - Live"
  - Tania León, composer (London Philharmonic Orchestra & Edward Gardner)
- "Tríptico Sudamericano"
  - Elodie Bouny, composer (Berta Rojas featuring Pedro Franco, Federico Tarazona & Jorge Glem)
- "Yanga"
  - Gabriela Ortiz, composer (Los Angeles Philharmonic, Gustavo Dudamel, Los Angeles Master Chorale & Tambuco Percussion Ensemble)

=== Visual Media ===
**Best Music for Visual Media**
- **O Agente Secreto (Trilha Sonora Original) – Mateus Alves & Tomaz Alves Souza**
  - Amor Animal – Murci Bouscayrol
  - La Casa de los Espíritus (Banda Sonora Original de la Serie de Amazon Prime) – Matthew Atticus Berger, Manuel Garcia, Víctor Jara, Fernando Milagros, Marcela Millie Soto, Tomas Videla & Juan Pablo Villanueva
  - Las Muertas – Fernando Velázquez
  - Menem (Banda Sonora de la Serie Original de Prime Video) – Sergei Grosny

=== Arrangement ===
**Best Arrangement**
- **"Dando y Dando"**
  - **Gonzalo Grau, arranger (Luis Enrique)**
- "Juanito Alimaña"
  - Daniel Barón & Henry Villalobos, arrangers (Dani Barón & Henry Villalobos)
- "Sonho Inca"
  - Rafael Beck & Felipe Montanaro, arrangers (Guilherme Rondon, Rafael Beck & Felipe Montanaro)
- "A Deriva (Adrift)"
  - Felipe Salles, arranger (Felipe Salles featuring Tatiana Parra)
- "Cazadero's March"
  - Teco Cardoso, arranger (Utupe Oficina Sonora, Mônica Salmaso, Teco Cardoso & Davi Fonseca)

=== Package Design ===
**Best Recording Package**
- **La Vida Era Más Corta**
  - **Justo Javier Benedetto, Milo J & Adrián Romero, art director (Milo J)**
- Amores Perros (Banda Sonora Original Reedición 25° Aniversario)
  - Dawn Baillie, art director (Various artists)
- Anela
  - Belén Aguilera, María Blaya Miralles & Alberto Cárdenas, art directors (Belén Aguilera)
- Florece en el Caos
  - Nicolas Fervenza, art director (No Te Va Gustar)
- La Huella de las Cuerdas
  - Celeste Prieto, art director (Berta Rojas)

=== Songwriting ===
**Songwriter of the Year**
- **Sara Schell**
  - **"A la Niña Que Fui" (Kany García)**
  - **"Ahí Estabas Tú" (Fonseca)**
  - **"Barco de Papel" (Fonseca)**
  - **"Bendito" (Rawayana)**
  - **"Si Te Vas" (J Balvin & Jay Wheeler)**
  - **"Vas a Quedarte" (Diego Torres & Manuel Carrasco)**
- Edgar Barrera
  - "Como de Sol a Sol" (Rawayana, Carín León & Grupo Frontera)
  - "Dando Vueltas" (Rauw Alejandro)
  - "Después de Ti" (Karol G & Greg Gonzalez)
  - "ni pedo" (Peso Pluma & Tito Double P)
  - "Para Que Seas Feliz" (Ricardo Montaner)
- Iván Gámez
  - "Cuento de Nunca Acabar" (Carlos Rivera & Ana Bárbara)
  - "Donde Estés, Donde Estoy" (Carlos Rivera & Marisela)
  - "Hiere" (Adrián Cota)
  - "La Morrita" (Xavi & Carín León)
  - "La Que Se Fue, Se Fue" (Christian Nodal)
  - "No Capea" (Xavi featuring Grupo Frontera)
  - "Ojitos Bellos" (Grupo Frontera)
  - "Olvídate" (Carín León)
  - "Tú Ni en Cuenta" (Banda Ms de Sergio Lizárraga & Manuel Turizo)
- Yoel Henriquez
  - "5 Minutos" (Luis Figueroa)
  - "El Amor y Sus Consecuencias" (Gale)
  - "Loco Enamorado" (Fonseca)
  - "Me Veía" (Alejandro Sanz)
  - "Mi Norte & Mi Sur" (Diego Torres & Edén Muñoz)
- Jenni Mosello
  - "Desgraça" (Anitta)
  - "Doce Feito Caramelo" (Iza)
  - "Muda Tudo" (Dani Black)
  - "Rua da Saudade" (Bárbara Bandeira)

=== Production ===
Production, Songwriting and Package Fields
**Producer of the Year**: **Edgar Barrera**; **"Cada Vez Me Gusta Más" (Grupo Frontera & Alejandro Fernández)**; **"Carranga" (Carín León & Juanes)**; **"Coleccionando Heridas" (Karol G & Marco Antonio Solís)**; **"La Morrita" (Xavi & Carín León)**; **"Mi Gran Amor" (Santana & Becky G)**; **"Monterrey" (Grupo Frontera)**; **"Perlas Negras" (Natanael Cano & Gabito Ballesteros)**; **"Pvta Luna" (Netón Vega)**; **"Viajando por el Mundo" (Karol G & Manu Chao)**; Julio Raposo; "Caminhador" (Anitta); Canto Djavan (Slap); Força da Juventude (Os Garotin); "Salvador" (Zeca Veloso, Caetano Veloso, Moreno Veloso & Tom Veloso); Troco Likes 10 Anos (Tiago Iorc); Santiago Ruiz "Tatool"; La Vida Era Más Corta (Milo J); Turr4zo (Trueno); Juan Pablo Vega; "Boleritoxx" (Feid); Cachacoleto (Juan Pablo Vega); "De Mi Para Mi" (Maca & Gero); "El Observador" (Duplat & Esteman); "Las Canas de Mi Amor" (Juan Pablo Vega); "Oscar Alfonso" (Caloncho); "Palacama" (Caloncho); "Que Vuelta Vox" (Feid); Federico Vindver; Free Spirits (Ca7riel & Paco Amoroso)	**Best Engineered Album**: **Lux (Complete Works)**; **Daniel Cayotte, Isaac Diskin, Tristan Hoogland, Jake Miller, David Rodríguez & Harry Wilson, engineers; Manny Marroquin, mixer; Bob Jackson & Brian Lee, mastering engineers (Rosalía)**; Boas Novas; Mauro Araújo & Kira Malevskaia, engineers; Duda Mello, mixer; Alexandre Rabaço, mastering engineer (Zeca Veloso); Esgotada; Tó Brandileone, Kaique Del Giudice, Pedro Emmanuel, Lucas Fernandes & André Whoong, engineers; João Milliet & Ricardo Mosca, mixers; Felipe Tichauer, mastering engineer (Tiê); Marco; Pedro Peixoto Rievers, mixer; Henrique Filizzola, mastering engineer (Marco Baptista); Taracá; Carles Campi Campón, mixer; Fred Kevorkian, mastering engineer (Jorge Drexler)

=== Music Video ===
Music Video Field
**Best Short Form Music Video**: **"Sauvignon Blanc" – Rosalía**; **Noah Dillon, video director; Laura Elizabeth Seydel, video producer**; "10 anos de Castelos & Ruinas" – BK'; Willy Hajli & Poeta Visual, video directors; Tutu Menezes, Vitor Jun Nozaki Cardoso, Rodrigo Rondino & Claudio Zanoti, video producers; "Chingona" – Tamara Flores; Harlock Chavez & Rupert Höller, video directors; Svetlana Pavlova & Alexa Pereda Puente, video producers; "Moleirinha" – Karetus featuring Isabel Silvestre, Conan Osíris & Julio Pereira; Gonçalo Pereira, video director; Mafalda Leal Da Costa, video producer; "Inri" – Los Tres; Pato Escala & NJ López, video directors; Pato Escala & NJ López, video producers	**Best Long Form Music Video**: **Free Spirits (The Film) – Ca7riel & Paco Amoroso**; **Ferran Echegaray & Ferina, video directors; Jean-Baptiste Fusil, Ellie Loarca & Francisco Wechsler, video producers**; Hasta Que Me Quede Sin Voz – Leiva; Mario Forniés & Lucas Nolla, video directors; Mario Forniés, video producer; Guerras Invisíveis – L7nnon; Kaique Alves & Thiago Eva, video directors; Fernando Alonso & Eduardo Saraiva, video producers; Back to the Childhood – Maleh; Maurizio Iazzetta, video director; Jeffer Lozada & Marcial Suárez, video producers; Flamenco – Various artists; Carla Simón, video director; Mónica Blas, Claudia Mayer, Oscar Romagosa & Albert Soler, video producers

== Special merit awards ==
The recipient of the Latin Recording Academy Person of the Year was announced on April 7, 2026. The recipients of the Lifetime Achievement Awards and Trustees Award were announced on June 30.

Person of the Year

- Daddy Yankee

Lifetime Achievement Awards

- Alaska
- Francisco Céspedes
- Lila Downs
- Daniela Mercury
- Chichí Peralta

Trustee Award

- Omar Alfanno

== Background ==
In March 2026, the Latin Recording Academy announced several changes for different categories:

=== Category changes ===
- The following three categories were renamed: Best Latin Electronic Music Performance into Best Electronic Music Performance, Best Urban/Urban Fusion Performance into Best Urban Performance, and Best Classical Contemporary Composition into Best Classical Composition. Additionally, the category for Best Portuguese-Language Urban Performance was changed to an album category and renamed Best Portuguese Language Urban Album.
- Eligibility requirements for the Best New Artist category were slightly changed. Now, an artist is not eligible for consideration if they have released more than three albums, or 25 singles, or a combination of albums and singles that surpasses these limits.
- For the Best Instrumental Album, vocals can be used in up to 40% of the total playing time, while requiring that at least 60% of the work remain instrumental.
- For the categories from the Singer-Songwriter field, a singer-songwriter may compose and perform some songs with a colleague, provided the required participation percentages are met. Specifically for the Best Singer-Songwriter Album category, the artist(s) must both write and perform together on at least 75% of the album for it to be eligible.
- For the Best Contemporary Tropical Album, albums influenced by or belonging to Kompa Haitiano are now included.
