= Equilibrium (Anitta album) =

Studio album by Anitta
- Released: 16 April 2026
- Recorded: September 2025 – January 2026
- Genres: Samba; reggae; axé; world music
- Length: 43:11
- Languages: Portuguese; Spanish; English
- Labels: Floresta; Republic; Universal Latin

Anitta chronology
Ensaios da Anitta (2024)	Equilibrium (2026)	Equilibrium II (2026)

Singles from Equilibrium
- 1. "Choka Choka" Released: 10 April 2026

Equilibrium (stylized as EQUILIBRIVM) is the seventh studio album by Brazilian singer Anitta. It was released on April 16, 2026 through Floresta Records, Republic Records and Universal Latin Entertainment. The project's structure is based on two distinct acts: the first consists of compositions focused on multiple Brazilian genres and themes, while the second leans harder into spirituality and Candomblé themes.

Combining Brazilian and Afro-Brazilian musical genres such as axé, ijexá, samba, and MPB. The lyrical content explores elements of Afro-Brazilian religions like Candomblé, a religion the singer practices, with lyrics that openly discuss her spiritual connection, orixás, and the balance she has found in spirituality. It features special appearances by Marina Sena, Liniker, Luedji Luna, Melly, Ponto de Equilíbrio, Os Garotin, Rincon Sapiência, KING Saints, Ebony, Papatinho, Shakira, Los Brasileros, and Emanazul.

Equilibrium was well received by music critics, with praise for its conceptual shift, grounding in spirituality, and artistic maturity. The album registered approximately 8.2 million streams on Spotify during its first 24 hours of availability. It figure set a record for the biggest debut for an album by a Latin artist in 2026. The album was also the top global album debut of the week of April 17-19, 2026 on Spotify, reaching the number one spot.

At the 27th Annual Latin Grammy Awards, it received two nominations: Album of the Year and Best Portuguese Language Contemporary Pop Album, winning the latter. This marked Anitta's first-ever Latin Grammy Award. Furthermore, it is nominated for Best Global Music Album at the 69th Annual Grammy Awards, marking Anitta's third nomination at the main ceremony.

== Composition and structure ==
Equilibrium features a dual structure, divided into two acts that differ in terms of sound, themes, and language. The first act consists exclusively of songs in Portuguese, incorporating genres present in Brazilian musical culture, including samba, axé, and reggae. This section of the record incorporates rhythmic influences of African origin, with beats inspired by traditions associated with macumba.

The second act, in turn, is directed toward the international market with tracks recorded in English and, predominantly, in Spanish. This stage of the project includes reinterpretations of songs from the first act translated into Spanish, as well as new versions in other languages of songs released early in the career of Anitta, which were originally recorded in Portuguese.

== Promotion ==
The promotional strategy for Equilibrium is segmented according to the linguistic content of its acts: the promotion of the Portuguese-language material is coordinated by the artist herself in the Brazilian market, with distribution scheduled for the first half of 2026, following the Carnival period. In contrast, the foreign-language material is managed by Republic Records and her international management team, with release planned for the second half of 2026, after the conclusion of the 2026 FIFA World Cup in June.

On March 6, 2026, the samba "Pinterest" was released as the album's lead single. On April 10, "Choka Choka" with Colombian singer Shakira was released as the album's second single.

== Accolades ==
Awards and nominations
Award	Year	Category	Result	Ref.
Grammy Awards	2027	Best Global Music Album	Pending	
Heat Latin Music Awards	2026	Album of the Year	Nominated	
Latin Grammy Awards	2026	Album of the Year	Nominated	
Latin Grammy Awards	2026	Best Portuguese Language Contemporary Pop Album	Won	
Multishow Brazilian Music Awards	2026	Album of the Year	Pending	
Premios Juventud	2026	Album of the Year	Nominated	
WME Awards	2026	Album	Pending	

== Track listing ==
No.	Title	Writer(s)	Producer(s)	Length
1.	"Desgraça"	KING Saints; Gabriel Ramos; Gabriel Duarte; Gianlucca "Janluska" Azevedo; Jenni Mosello	Janluska; Duarte	2:50
2.	"Mandinga" (with Marina Sena)	Anitta; Sena; Baden Aquino; Bárbara Dias; Carolina Marcílio; Saints; Elana Dara; Duarte; Janluska; Mosello; Marcus Moraes	Janluska; Duarte	3:06
3.	"Caminhador" (with Liniker)	Liniker; Dias; Marcilio; Dara; Julio Silva; Leonardo Guimarães; Lucas Anchieta; Pedro Santos; Uiliam Silveira; Victor Cupertino	Pepê Santos; Uiliam Pimenta; Raposo	3:03
4.	"Bemba" (with Luedji Luna)	Francisco Chagas; Luís Nascimento; Samir Trindade	Magary Lord; Trindade; Paulo Bass	2:15
5.	"Ternura" (with Melly)	Arthur Marques; Saints; Djalma Filho; Iuri Rio Branco; Laryssa Loureiro; Luis Barros; Melly Araujo	Branco	2:59
6.	"Deus Existe" (with Ponto de Equilíbrio)	Marcílio; Saints; Branco; Loureiro; Araujo	Branco	3:15
7.	"Caso de Amor" (with Os Garotin)	Marques; Filho; Branco; Luis Barros; Araujo	Branco	3:02
8.	"Várias Quejas"	Anitta; Daramola; Ana Gomez; Daniel Rondón; Germano Silva; Héctor Ramos; Jon Leone; Manuel Freire; Miguel Vélez; Narcizinho; Wagner Silva	Daramola; Leone; Mazarri	2:55
9.	"So Much Love"	Anitta; Richard Camacho; Robert Molina	Richard Camacho; Molina	2:39
10.	"Pinterest" (Spanish version)	Anitta; Rondón; Miguelange; Ana Macedo; Spread LOF; Daramola; JonTheProducer; Mazzarri	Daramola; JonTheProducer; Mazzarri	2:14
11.	"Nanã" (with Rincon Sapiência and KING Saints)	Dias; Carlos Costa; Saints; Sapiência; Dara; Grinaldo Santos; Mosello; Liliam Albuquerque; Mateus Lima; Papatinho	Papatinho; Carlos do Complexo	2:44
12.	"Vai Dar Caô" (with Ebony and Papatinho)	Anitta; Anne Dudley; Saints; Gary Langan; Jonathan Jeczalik; Albuquerque; Milena Oliveira; Paul Morley; Sara Schell; Trevor Horn	Papatinho	2:24
13.	"Choka Choka" (with Shakira)	Anitta; Shakira; Daramola; Alessandra Bregante; Daniel Otero; Rondón; Hyonvane Mendoza; Kevyn Cruz; Papatinho	Shakira; Daramola; Papatinho	2:11
14.	"Meia Noite" (with Los Brasileros)	Anitta; Danilo Valbusa; Mosello; Lucas Fraga; Marcelo Ferraz; Pedro Caropreso	Los Brasileros	2:26
15.	"Ouro" (with Emanazul)	Ana Cenamo; Bianca Caetano; Costa; Marcílio; Mosello; Albuquerque; Lamare; Papatinho	Papatinho; Carlos do Complexo; Delamare	5:02
Total length:				43:11

== Charts ==
Chart performance for Equilibrium
Chart (2026)	Peak position
Portuguese Albums (AFP)	5
