= Vanessa da Mata discography =

Brazilian MPB singer-songwriter Vanessa da Mata discography

This is a comprehensive listing of official releases by Vanessa da Mata, a Brazilian MPB singer-songwriter. Since 2002, she has released three studio albums on Sony Music Entertainment. According to the Associação Brasileira de Produtores de Disco (Brazilian Association of Record Producers), da Mata has sold over 1,700,000 albums in her home country.

== Albums ==
Studio albums

Album Title	Album details	Peak chart positions		Certifications
Album Title	Album details	BRA	POR	Certifications
Vanessa da Mata	Released: 31 August 2002; Label: Sony BMG; Format: Digital download, CD; Sales: 150,000	42	23	PMB: Gold
Essa Boneca Tem Manual	Released: 3 February 2004; Label: Sony BMG; Format: Digital download, CD; Sales: 250,000	11	—	PMB: Gold
Sim	Released: 28 May 2007; Label: Sony BMG; Format: Digital download, CD; Sales: 600,000	4	3	PMB: Platinum
Bicicletas, Bolos e Outras Alegrias	Released: 13 October 2010; Label: Sony BMG; Format: Digital download, CD; Sales: 150,000	4	23	
Segue o Som	Released: 25 March 2014; Label: Jabuticaba; Format: Digital download, CD; Sales: 50,000	6	—	
Quando Deixamos Nossos Beijos na Esquina	Released: 31 May 2019; Label: Jabuticaba; Format: Digital download, CD	5	—	
Vem Doce	Released: 8 March 2023; Label: Jabuticaba; Format: Digital download, CD	3	—	
Todas Elas	Released: 12 May 2025; Label: Jabuticaba; Format: Digital download, CD	1	—	

Live albums

Album Title	Album details	Peak chart positions	Certifications
Album Title	Album details	BRA	Certifications
Multishow Ao Vivo	Released: April 2009; Label: Sony BMG; Format: Digital download, CD, DVD; Sales: 250,000	9	PMB: Gold
Caixinha de Música - Ao Vivo	Released: 29 September 2017; Label: Sony BMG; Format: Digital download, CD, DVD; Sales: 5,000	6	

Tribute albums

Album Title	Album details	Peak chart positions	
Album Title	Album details	BRA	POR
Vanessa da Mata canta Tom Jobim	Released: 4 July 2013; Label: Sony BMG; Format: Digital download, CD; Sales: 100,000	2	17

Video Albums

Album Title	Album details	Peak chart positions
Album Title	Album details	BRA
Multishow Ao Vivo	Released: April 2009; Label: Sony BMG; Format: Digital download, CD, DVD; Sales: 150,000	3
Caixinha de Música - Ao Vivo	Released: 29 September 2017; Label: Sony BMG; Format: Digital download, CD, DVD; Sales: 6,000	6

EPs

- 2007: CD Zero (Sim EP)

== Singles ==
Year	Single	Chart positions					Certifications	Album
Year	Single	ITA	POR	SWI	SWE	BRA	Certifications	Album
2002	"Não Me Deixe Só"	—	42	—	—	1		Vanessa da Mata
2002	"Onde Ir"	—	—	—	—	93		Vanessa da Mata
2003	"Nossa Canção"	—	—	—	—	40		Vanessa da Mata
2006	"Ai, Ai, Ai"	—	—	—	—	23	PMB: Gold	Essa Boneca Tem Manual
2006	"Ai, Ai, Ai" (Deep Lick Radio Mix)	—	—	—	13	1		Essa Boneca Tem Manual
2006	"Eu Sou Neguinha?"	—	—	—	—	58		Essa Boneca Tem Manual
2006	"Ainda Bem"	—	—	—	—	21		Essa Boneca Tem Manual
2006	"Música"	—	—	—	—	89		Essa Boneca Tem Manual
2006	"Por Enquanto" (Live)	—	—	—	—	—		None
2007	"Boa Sorte/Good Luck" (with Ben Harper)	18	1	85	51	1	FIMI: Gold; PMB: Gold	Sim
2008	"Amado"	—	—	—	—	1		Sim
2009	"Um Dia, Um Adeus"	—	—	—	—	50		Multishow Ao Vivo
2010	"O Tal Casal"	—	—	—	—	54		Bicicletas, bolos e outras alegrias
2010	"Te Amo"	—	—	—	—	38		Bicicletas, bolos e outras alegrias
2011	"As Palavras (Mister Jam Remix)"	—	—	—	—	17		Bicicletas, bolos e outras alegrias
2013	"Fotografia"	—	—	—	—	—		Vanessa da Mata canta Tom Jobim
2013	"Falando de Amor"	—	—	—	—	—		Vanessa da Mata canta Tom Jobim
2014	"Segue o Som"	—	—	—	—	16		Segue o Som
2014	"Ninguém É Igual A Ninguém (Desilusão)"	—	—	—	—	—		Segue o Som
2014	"Por Onde Ando Tenho Você"	—	—	—	—	—		Segue o Som
2015	"Passarinhos" (with Emicida)	—	—	—	—	47	PMB: 2× Platinum	Sobre Crianças, Quadris, Pesadelos e Lições de Casa...
2017	"É Tudo O Que Eu Quero Ter"	—	—	—	—	54		Caixinha de Música
2017	"Gente Feliz (Sinceridade)"	—	—	—	—	22		Caixinha de Música
2019	"Só Você e Eu"	—	—	—	—	12		Quando Deixamos Nossos Beijos na Esquina
2022	"Hoje Eu Sei"	—	—	—	—	—		Quando Deixamos Nossos Beijos na Esquina
2022	"Tudo Bateu" (with Ivete Sangalo)	—	—	—	—	22		Onda Boa com Ivete
2022	"Vem Doce"	—	—	—	—	—	PMB: Platinum	Vem Doce
2023	"Comentário a Respeito de John" (with João Gomes)	—	—	—	—	34	PMB: Platinum	Vem Doce
2025	"Esperança"	—	—	—	—	31		Todas Elas

== Promotional singles ==
Year	Single	Chart positions	Album
Year	Single	BRA	Album
2018	"Apenas Mais Uma De Amor"	86	—N/a
2022	"Nação de Passarinhos" (with Marcelo Falcão)	—	—N/a
2023	"Foice"	—	Vem Doce
2023	"Fique Aqui" (with L7nnon)	—	Vem Doce
2024	"Rindo com Você"	—	Vem Doce

== Soundtrack appearances ==
Year	Song	Album
2002	"Onde Ir"	Esperança Nacional (soap)
2003	"Nossa Canção"	Celebridade Nacional (soap)
2005	"Eu Sou Neguinha"	A Lua Me Disse (soap)
2005	"Ai, Ai, Ai" (Deep Lick Radio Mix)	Belíssima (soap)
2006	"Música"	Muito Gelo e Dois Dedos D'Água (motion picture)
2006	"Ainda Bem"	Pé na Jaca (soap)
2008	"Amado"	A Favorita (soap)
2010	"Um Dia, Um Adeus"	Cama de Gato (soap)
2011	"As Palavras"	Morde & Assopra (soap)
2011	"Te Amo"	Aquele Beijo (soap)
2014	"Sunshine on My Shoulders"	Geração Brasil (soap)

== Songs recorded by other artists ==
- "A Força que Nunca Seca" - Maria Bethânia (A Força que Nunca Seca, 1999)
- "Viagem" - Daniela Mercury (Sol da Liberdade, 2000)
- "Me Sento na Rua" - Ana Carolina (Ana Rita Joana Iracema e Carolina, 2001)
- "O Canto de Dona Sinhá" - Maria Bethânia (Maricotinha, 2001 e Maricotinha Ao Vivo, 2002)
