= Boa Sorte / Good Luck =

2008 single by Vanessa da Mata featuring Ben Harper

Single by Vanessa da Mata featuring Ben Harper

from the album Sim
- Released: July 2007
- Genre: MPB; Reggae fusion
- Length: 3:53
- Label: Sony
- Songwriters: Vanessa da Mata; Ben Harper

Vanessa da Mata singles chronology
"Ai, Ai, Ai..." (2006)	"Boa Sorte/ Good Luck" (2007)	"Amado" (2008)

Ben Harper singles chronology
"Fight Outta You" (2007)	"Boa Sorte/ Good Luck" (2007)	"In The Colors" (2007)

"Boa Sorte" / "Good Luck" is the first single from Sim, the third studio album by Brazilian singer-songwriter Vanessa da Mata. The song features American singer Ben Harper. In Brazil, it was the most played song in 2008, according to Crowley Broadcast Analysis.

A version entirely in English, titled "Good Luck", was recorded and included on the international edition of the album and is available on digital platforms.

== Musicians ==
- Vanessa da Mata – vocal
- Ben Harper – vocal and lap steel

Original version of the album Sim

- Robbie Shakespeare – bass
- Sly Dunbar – drums
- Davi Moraes e Kassin – guitar
- Roberto Pollo – organ
- Sticky – percussion

Re-recorded version of the album Multishow Ao Vivo

- Juan Nelson – bass
- Oliver Charles – drums
- Michael Ward – guitar
- Leon Mobley – percussion
- Jason Yates – keyboards

== Charts ==
Chart (2007)	Peak position
France Top 100	48
Portugal Digital Songs	1
Sweden (Sverigetopplistan)	51
Switzerland (Schweizer Hitparade)	85
