= Kevin Aguilar =

Kevin Aguilar may refer to:

- Kevin Aguilar (mixed martial artist) (born 1988), an American mixed martial artist.
- Kevin Aguilar (singer) (born 2011), a Mexican singer and songwriter

== See also ==
- Kevin Aguiar (born 1972), American politician
