= Equilibrium II =

Studio album by Anitta
- Released: July 23, 2026
- Recorded: September 2025 – January 2026
- Genres: MPB; reggae; pop; brazilian funk; samba; forró; bossa nova
- Length: 49:49; 93:00 (with part I)
- Languages: Portuguese, Spanish, Kaiwá, Yoruba
- Labels: Floresta; Republic; Universal Latin

Anitta chronology
Equilibrivm (2026)	Equilibrium II (2026)

Equilibrium II (stylized as EQUILIBRIVM II) is the eighth studio album by Brazilian singer Anitta, released on July 23, 2026, through Floresta Records, Republic Records, and Universal Latin Entertainment. It is the second half of a two-part project, serving as the companion to the artist's seventh studio album, Equilibrivm (2026).

== Track listing ==
Disc I
No.	Title	Length
1.	"Você Já Sabe" (featuring Los Brasileros)	2:44
2.	"Sal Grosso" (featuring KBrum)	2:31
3.	"Não Me Cutuca" (featuring Alceu Valença)	2:35
4.	"Eu Não Sou Santa" (featuring Mestrinho)	2:31
5.	"Feitiço" (featuring Mart'nália)	2:53
6.	"Ponta do Pé"	3:12
7.	"Abre Caminho" (featuring Alexandre Carlo)	2:32
8.	"Tudo Isso"	3:35
9.	"Sem Pressa" (featuring MC Tha)	2:31
10.	"Deus Mãe" (featuring KING Saints)	2:20
11.	"Ogum Me Rodeia" (featuring Maria Bethânia and Letícia Fialho)	3:55
12.	"Contemplação" (featuring Grupo Ofá)	3:26
13.	"Pra Você Gostar de Mim"	2:20
14.	"Divino Sexual"	3:32
15.	"Azul"	3:22
16.	"Respira"	3:14
17.	"Oke" (featuring Brô MC's and Katú Mirim)	2:42
Total length:		49:49

=== Notes ===
- Disc 2 of Equilibrium II reproduces the track listing of the standard edition of Equilibrivm.

== Charts ==
Chart performance for Equilibrium II
Chart (2026)	Peak position
Portuguese Albums (AFP)	4
