= Latin Grammy Award for Best Rap/Hip Hop Song =

Music award category

Latin Grammy Award for Best Rap Song
- Awarded for: quality vocal or instrumental rap music singles or tracks
- Country: United States
- Presented by: The Latin Recording Academy
- Currently held by: Trueno for "Fresh" (2025)
- Website: latingrammy.com

The Latin Grammy Award for Best Rap/Hip Hop Song is an award presented annually by the Latin Academy of Recording Arts & Sciences at the Latin Grammy Awards.

The description of the category at the 2020 Latin Grammy Awards states that it "includes the genres of Trap and Dancehall Songs" and states that "a song must contain at least 51% of the lyrics in Spanish or Portuguese and must be a new song." The award is to the songwriter(s), with instrumental recordings, sampling and cover songs not eligible for the category.

The category was first awarded at the 21st Annual Latin Grammy Awards in 2020, with Residente behind the inaugural winner for writing his song "Antes Que El Mundo Se Acabe".

== Recipients ==
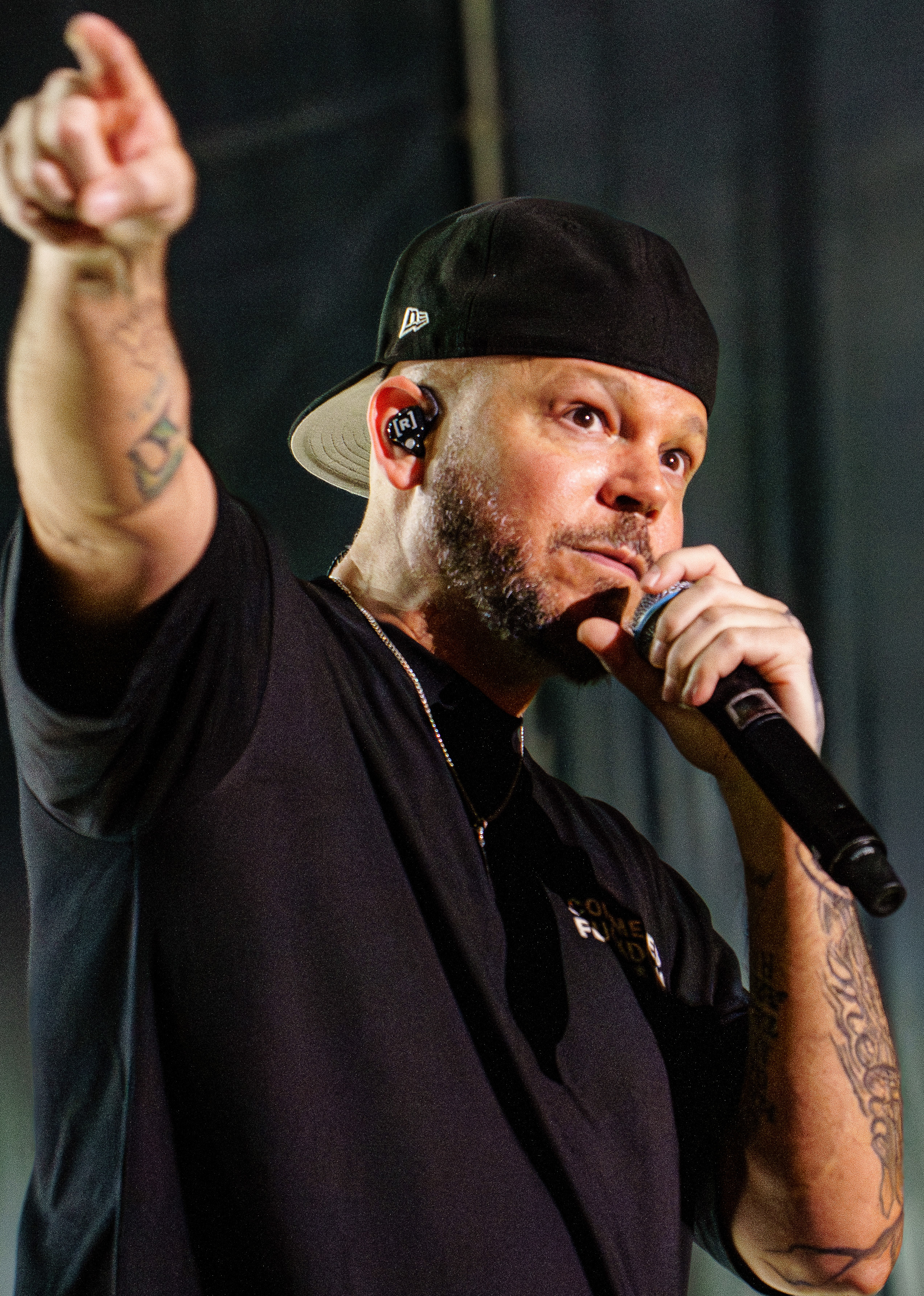
Residente was the inaugural winner of the award in 2020.

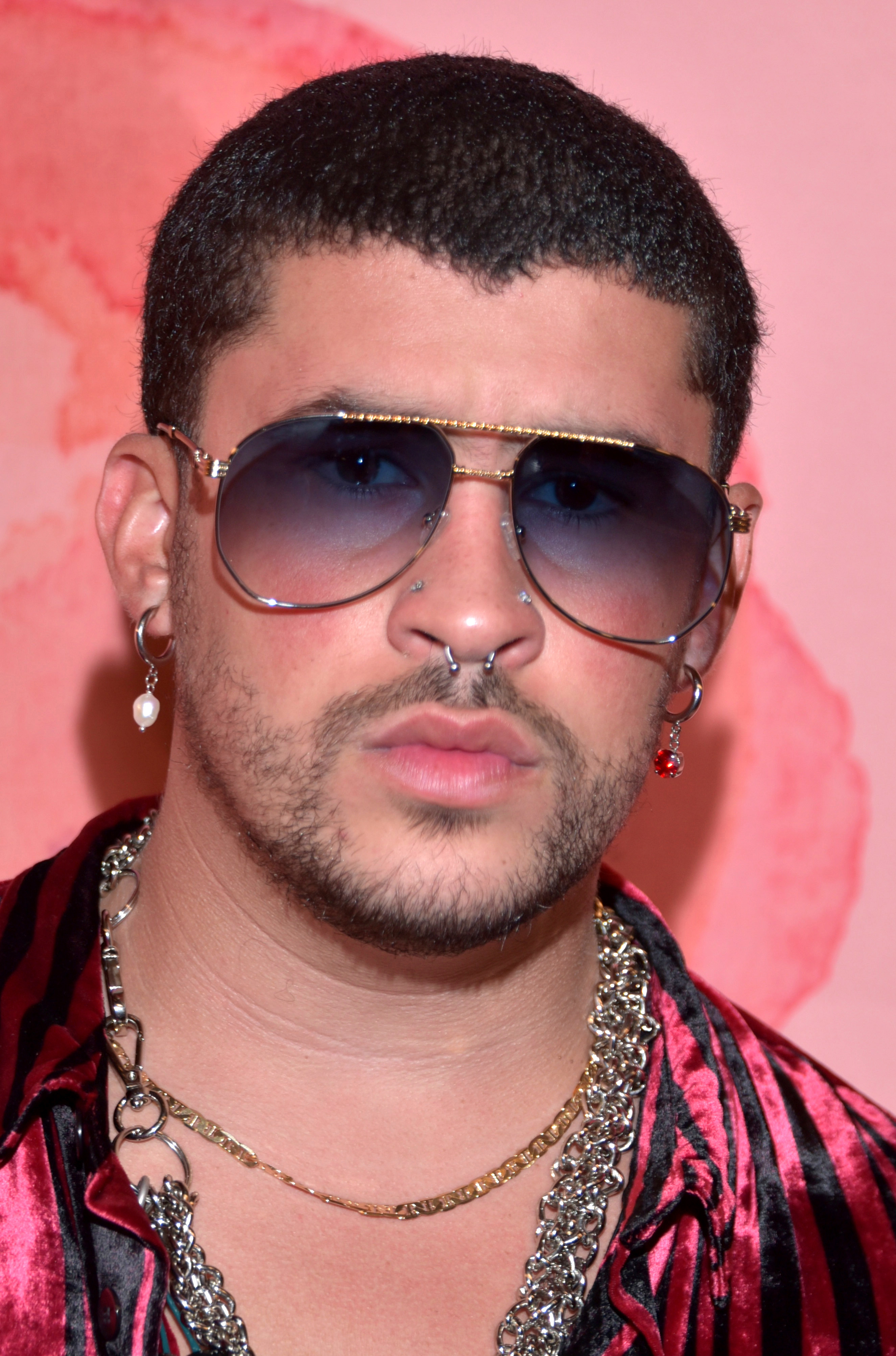
Three-time winner Bad Bunny.

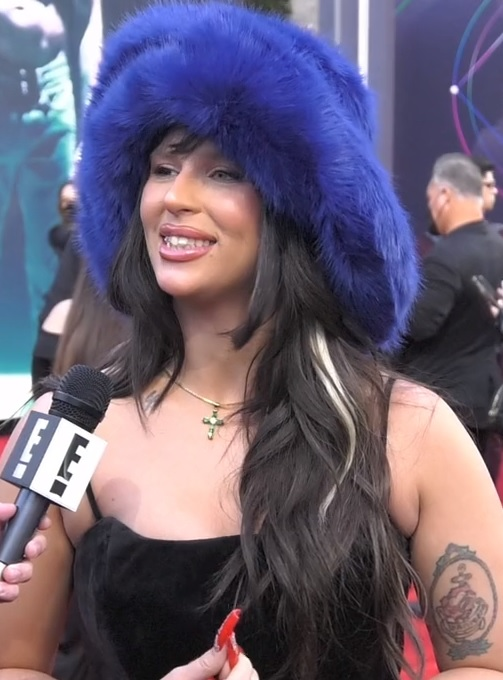
2024 winner Nathy Peluso.

Year	Songwriter(s)	Work	Performing artist(s)^{[II]}	Nominees	Ref.
2020	Residente	"Antes Que El Mundo Se Acabe"	Residente	Anuel AA – "Baile del Dinero" (Anuel AA); Duki – "Goteo" (Duki); Eladio Carrión and Bad Bunny – "Kemba Walker" (Eladio Carrión and Bad Bunny); Anuel AA, J Balvin, Jhay Cortez, Josias De La Cruz, Misael De La Cruz, Sergio Roldan, Elvin Roubert & Nydia Yera – "Medusa" (Jhay Cortez, Anuel AA & J Balvin)	
2021	Bad Bunny & Marco Daniel Borrero	"Booker T"	Bad Bunny	Akapellah & Pedro Querales – "Condenados" (Akapellah); Lito MC Cassidy – "La Vendedora de Placer" (Lito MC Cassidy); Rafa Arcaute, Gino Borri, Illmind, Ángel López, Nathy Peluso & Federico Vindver – "SANA SANA" (Nathy Peluso); Bizarrap & Snow Tha Product – "Snow Tha Product: Bzrp Music Sessions, Vol. 39" (Bizarrap & Snow Tha Product)	
2022	Bad Bunny	"De Museo"	Bad Bunny	Akapellah – "Amor" (Akapellah); Santiago Ruiz, Brian Taylor & Trueno – "Dance Crip" (Trueno); Phanlon Anton Alexander, Geovanny Andrades Andino, Lito MC Cassidy & Daddy Yankee – "El Gran Robo, Pt. 2" (Daddy Yankee & Lito MC Cassidy); Farina – "Freestyle 15" (Farina)	
2023	Bad Bunny & Eladio Carrión	"Coco Channel"	Eladio Carrion featuring Bad Bunny	Mauro De Tommaso & J Noa – "Autodidacta" (J Noa); Santiago Alvarado, Milo J, Nicki Nicole & Santiago Ruiz – "Dispara ***" (Nicki Nicole featuring Milo J); Martin Chris E, Feid & Esteban Higuita Estrada – "Le Pido a Dios" (Feid featuring Dj Premier); Akapellah – "Pá Ganá" (Akapellah); Vico C – "Pregúntale a Tu Papá Por Mi" (Vico C)	
2024	Pablo Drexler, Alberto Escámez López & Nathy Peluso	"Aprender a Amar"	Nathy Peluso	Eladio Carrión – "Bendecido" (Eladio Carrión); Al2 El Aldeano & Vico C – "Blam Blam" (Vico C featuring Al2 El Aldeano); Akapellah, Leonardo Daniel Díaz, José Gonzalez Ollarves, Marlon Luis Morales Santana, Luis Jacinto Muñoz Hernandez & Pedro Elías Querales – "La Sabia Escuela" (Akapellah featuring Canserbero & Lil Supa); Bad Bunny & Luar La L – "Teléfono Nuevo" (Bad Bunny featuring Luar La L); Bad Bunny & Eladio Carrión – "Thunder y Lightning" (Bad Bunny featuring Eladio Carrión)	
2025	Trueno	"Fresh"	Trueno	Noah Assad, José Carabaño, Eladio Carrión, Samuel David Jiménez, Adam Moralejo, Albert Packness & Big Soto – "El Favorito de Mami" (Big Soto featuring Eladio Carrion); Akapellah, Jesús Fuenmayor & Trueno – "Parriba" (Akapellah featuring Trueno); Samuel Wilfredo Dilone Castillo, Sócrates Rafael Francis Puello, J Noa & Vakero – "Sudor y Tinta" (J Noa & Vakero); Arcángel – "THC" (Arcángel)	
2026	J Noa & Trooko	"Antisistema"	J Noa & Trooko	Akapellah, Farlin Rafael Alonzo Flete & Melony Nathalie Redondo – "El Pana Deiby" (Akapellah); Arcángel – "Gohan y Goku" (Arcángel); Kase.O, Okeiflou & Tokischa – "Mono" (Tokischa & Kase.O); Feid & Lil Supa – "Poder" (Lil Supa, Feid & Tru Comers)	
