= Loulu Gilberto =

Brazilian singer

- Born: Luísa Carolina Gilberto; 22 June 2004 (age 22); Rio de Janeiro, Brazil
- Occupations: Singer, songwriter
- Years active: 2026–present
- Parents: João Gilberto; Claudia Faissol
- Musical career
- Instrument: Vocals
- Label: Sony Music

Luísa Carolina Gilberto, also known as Loulu Gilberto (June 22, 2004), is a Brazilian singer and songwriter.

== Biography ==
The youngest daughter of musician João Gilberto and journalist Claudia Faissol, Luísa was born in June 2004 in the city of Rio de Janeiro. In an interview with journalist Lucas Brêda of the Folha de S.Paulo newspaper, she stated that becoming a singer was her parents’ wish and that, as a child, she didn’t like the idea. She said that her interest in singing began in college, where she also became more familiar with her father’s artistic work.

She began her college studies in film, switching after two years to study theater at the Casa das Artes de Laranjeiras (CAL), located in Laranjeiras in Rio. She began her musical career with the release of the album Loulu Gilberto, released in 2026 by Sony Music. The debut received positive reviews from music critics. She was nominated in two categories at the 2026 Latin Grammys, best new artist and record of the year.

== Prizes and nominations ==
Year	Award	Category	Nominated work	Result	Ref.
2026	Latin Grammy Awards	Record of the Year	O amor nos encontrou	Nominated	
2026	Latin Grammy Awards	Best New Artist	Herself	Nominated	
