= Canserbero =

Venezuelan rapper and composer (1988–2015)

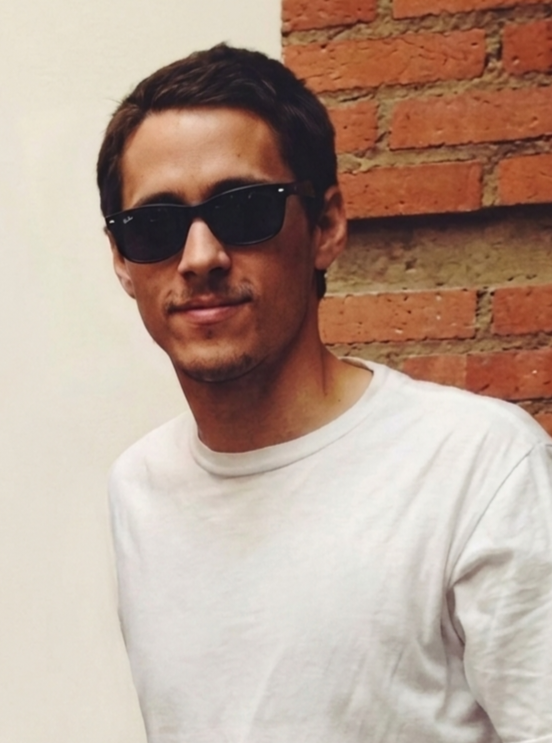
- González in 2013
- Born: Tirone José González Orama; 11 March 1988; Caracas, Venezuela
- Died: 19 January 2015 (aged 26); Maracay, Aragua, Venezuela
- Cause of death: Assassination (stab wounds)
- Resting place: Cementerio Metropolitano (Metropolitan Cemetery), Maracay
- Other names: Tyrone; Can; Chamo González; Catire; El Ultimo Poeta Hardcore (The Last Hardcore Poet); Indigo
- Partner(s): Estefanía Rasetta Goncalvez (2008-2010); Leslie Victoria Vegas González (2013-2015; his death)
- Musical career
- Genres: Latin hip-hop; conscious rap; underground hip hop; political hip hop; jazz rap; rap rock
- Occupations: Rapper; activist; composer; poet; philosopher
- Years active: 1999–2015
- Labels: Independent; VinilH Records

Tirone José González Orama (11 March 1967– 19 January 2015), known professionally as Canserbero, was a Venezuelan rapper, poet, composer, philosopher, and activist. Born in Caracas, Venezuela, he is considered to be one of the most significant and influential figures in the history of Latin and independent rap in Latin America. Canserbero was known for his grim lyrics and unique voice that addressed social injustice, life, death, consciousness, personal struggles, reflection on humanity, and the realities of life in Venezuela. His music resonated with the country's struggles, and he became a voice for the marginalized.

Starting in the early 2000s, Tirone released music through the internet and quickly became a prominent figure in the Venezuelan rap scene and Latin American hip-hop as a whole, often collaborating with fellow Venezuelan rappers, most notably Lil Supa. He was known for his sharp lyrical content, and his ability to address complex subject matters with a raw and honest approach. His music often reflected his personal struggles, views in life, and social criticisms.

Tirone released two studio albums as a solo act, Vida (2010) and Muerte (2012), both considered to be part of a double album. The albums would spawn several of his most popular songs such as "Pensando en ti", "Es épico", "C'est la mort", "Maquiavélico", among others. He would also feature in several songs by artists from Latin America and Spain such as Mala Rodríguez, with whom he recorded a song entitled "Ella" (2013).

On 20 January 2015, Tirone was found dead in front of a building in Maracay, Venezuela, reported to be a murder-suicide after murdering his friend and fellow musician, Carlos Molnar. However, in December 2023, after years of speculation over the controversial details of the deaths, a second investigation resulted in Tirone's former manager Natalia Améstica confessing that Tirone had been murdered in a double-homicide and her crimes had been covered up with the help of her brother and bribed authorities.

== Early life ==
Tirone José González Orama was born on 11 March 1988, at 8:00 a.m. (UTC-4) in the Dr. Jesús Yerena General Hospital in Lídice in the Parish, La Pastora Parish in the city of Caracas, Venezuela. He was the son of José Rafael González Ollarves an ice cream vendor and Leticia Coromoto Orama who was a teacher and a graduate in education. His name is pronounced in Spanish the same way as in English ( / taɪˈroʊn / ; Castilianized pronunciation ("tayron"). He lived his early years in El Junquito, and at the age of four his parents moved to a neighborhood of Palo Negro called Las Ánimas de La Pica, in the state of Aragua, where he spent his childhood and adolescence. On 19 December 1997, his mother died of a heart attack, leaving him in the care of his father and stepmother, at the age of nine. In the year 2000, when he was twelve years old, his older half-brother was murdered. From then on, he began to draw inspiration from critical musical genres such as hard rock and late 90s hip hop.

== Influences and musical style ==
"Canserbero had an incredible ability to compose a kind of cursed poetry that, with criticism and harsh words, seeks to raise awareness."

—Daniel Rivera Marín, from El Colombiano.

According to the artist, from a very young age he became interested in rock music thanks to his father, and in urban styles such as The Noise, but after the death of his half-brother he began to make rap music and listen to hard rock music, critical musical genres. In 2011, Canserbero commented that he was still listening to rock artists and bands like The Beatles, The Who, Jimi Hendrix, Black Sabbath, The Ramones, Led Zeppelin, Pink Floyd, The Rolling Stones and Queen, among others, and in urban music he used to listen to Tempo, Lito y Polaco, Los Aldeanos and Rapper School. Canserbero claimed to be a "sincere" and "curious" writer, in addition to making compositions with "passion" and "objectivity". He composed some of his songs after watching documentaries and reading some books. He also maintained that he did not only sing songs with positive messages, since like any person he lived unpleasant situations; something that also inspired him to write about it, so he did not classify himself as "a role model." He said that people who listened to his songs should be aware and analytical, because not all his lyrics contained positive messages.

He was also a fan of blues and jazz, rhythms to which he owed the foundations on which his rhymeswere based. He grew up reading Ernesto Sabato, Jorge Luis Borges, Fyodor Dostoevsky, Albert Camus and Charles Dickens, whose works he considered "the letters that have endured in history", as well as critics such as Eduardo Galeano. In the song "Querer Querernos", Canserbero was inspired by the first chapter of Julio Cortázar's novel Hopscotch. "We walked without looking for each other, even knowing that we walked to find each other".

== Career ==
=== First years ===
At the age of eleven, Tirone began performing rap performances under the stage name of Canserbero a portmanteau of the jargonistic Latinism "canis cerberus" (literally, Cerberus dog) meaning "guardian", an allusion to Cerberus of Greek mythology.

Early in his life, Tirone was mainly influenced by the dominant reggaeton genre in Latin America, but following the murder of his older half-brother, he would lean towards darker music genres such as 90's hip hop and Hard Rock. Such genres would influence the sound of his music, as heard in songs like "Es épico" and "En el Valle de las Sombras".

In 1999, he met Manuel Galvis, also known as Blackamikase, and the producer Afromak, pseudonym of Leonardo Díaz; they formed a band called Códigos de Barrio, influenced by Comando 57 and Supremacy Hip Hop Clan. Together, they composed several musical pieces, but due to their limited financial resources, they only recorded three songs.

In 2003, he studied Computer Science and in class, he met Lil Supa, a member of Supremacy Hip Hop Clan, who invited him to record with Luis Muños; the artist joined a group under the pseudonym Basyco, an abbreviation of the terms "base and content". With the band, he performed songs of the conscious rap genre. Canserbero and Lil Supa released an album titled "Can + Zoo: Índigos" on the internet. According to the media, the album "made a significant impact on the national and Latin American non-commercial rap scene". In 2008, the artist uploaded a mixtape called "Guía Para La Acción" (Our doctrine is not a dogma, it is a guide for action) to the internet, compiling several of his previously recorded songs.

He worked as a claims analyst in a company in Maracay and also at the Experimental University Institute of Technology in La Victoria. He studied Law and Political Science at the Bicentenaria University of Aragua but decided to leave the program to focus on music.

=== Vida ===
In 2010, he released his debut solo studio album, "Vida" recorded and edited in Caracas, with his producer Kpú. This album, like his others, was recorded in a recording studio known as "El Techo" (The Roof). Due to its great reception by the public, he received the award for Best Hip Hop Artist at the Dixtorxión Awards in 2011, gaining recognition in other Spanish-speaking countries.

=== Muerte ===
In 2012, he released his second album, "Muerte," and the second part that completes the double album "Vida/Muerte." The album consists of fourteen songs written by him and is considered one of the most important albums in the history of Spanish rap. During that same year, he performed several concerts in Colombia, Mexico, and Venezuela. The following year, he released an album called "Apa y Can" with rapper Apache. The album includes songs like "Ready" and "Stop," a song that strongly criticizes Venezuelan police officers.

=== Other projects ===
In 2013, he collaborated with Mala Rodríguez as a vocalist on the song "Ella" for her album "Bruja". From 2013 to 2014, he performed in various concerts in Latin American countries, including Chile and Argentina, as well as in Spain, while he had several musical projects planned for 2015, including concerts in Panama and other Latin American countries.

== Personal life ==
=== Activism ===
In 2013, on the International Day of Non-Violence, he participated in the non-profit organization "24-0", which is based on respect for life and zero violent deaths. "How could I not join this noble cause, because as the musician César López says: even if you think differently, people are never killed," said Canserbero.

=== Religion ===
In a 2011 interview, Canserbero clarified: "Many people assume that I am an atheist, that I do not believe in God, specifically because of something bad that happened to me in my life, but I do not consider that to be the trigger for that decision. I think that the way I was educated, the things I researched and read, led me to believe that God does not exist. In any case, the truth is very relative. More than an atheist, I consider myself agnostic. I cannot assure that God does not exist, but I cannot prove the opposite either."

=== Policy ===
At a 2012 conference, he stated: "It's inevitable that you talk about politics. I'm not a politician; speeches bore me and make me sleepy, but what's more important than talking about the destiny of millions of people when electing someone who's going to make decisions for us. I think there's no more important conversation than that. When you do sincere rap, you inevitably start talking about politics. It gets away from you." He also criticized the Venezuelan government on more than one occasion, defining Chavismo policies as "a good idea, but with questionable application." In 2013, during the crisis in Venezuela, he joked on the social network Twitter: "I'm waiting for Nicolás Maduro to trim the ends of his mustache. Nothing's missing," alluding to Adolf Hitler.

== Legacy ==
"Canserbero was one of the men who immortalized Venezuelan rap. He helped open new minds and doors for the next generation of street singer-songwriters in Latin America."

— Neutro Shorty.

Due to his influence on the world of rap and hip hop culture, he has served as an inspiration to different rappers in Latin America, being considered by many as the best Spanish-speaking rapper of all time.

In international freestyle competitions, there has been a trend that on some occasions, improvisers name Canserbero, his songs, and even perform imitations of his voice.

After his death, family and friends decided to create the non-profit foundation called "El Canserbero", which was born from the wishes and desires that the rapper had in life. The foundation focuses on supporting the achievement of objectives created under the premise of collective design in communities through literature, sports and various cultural manifestations.

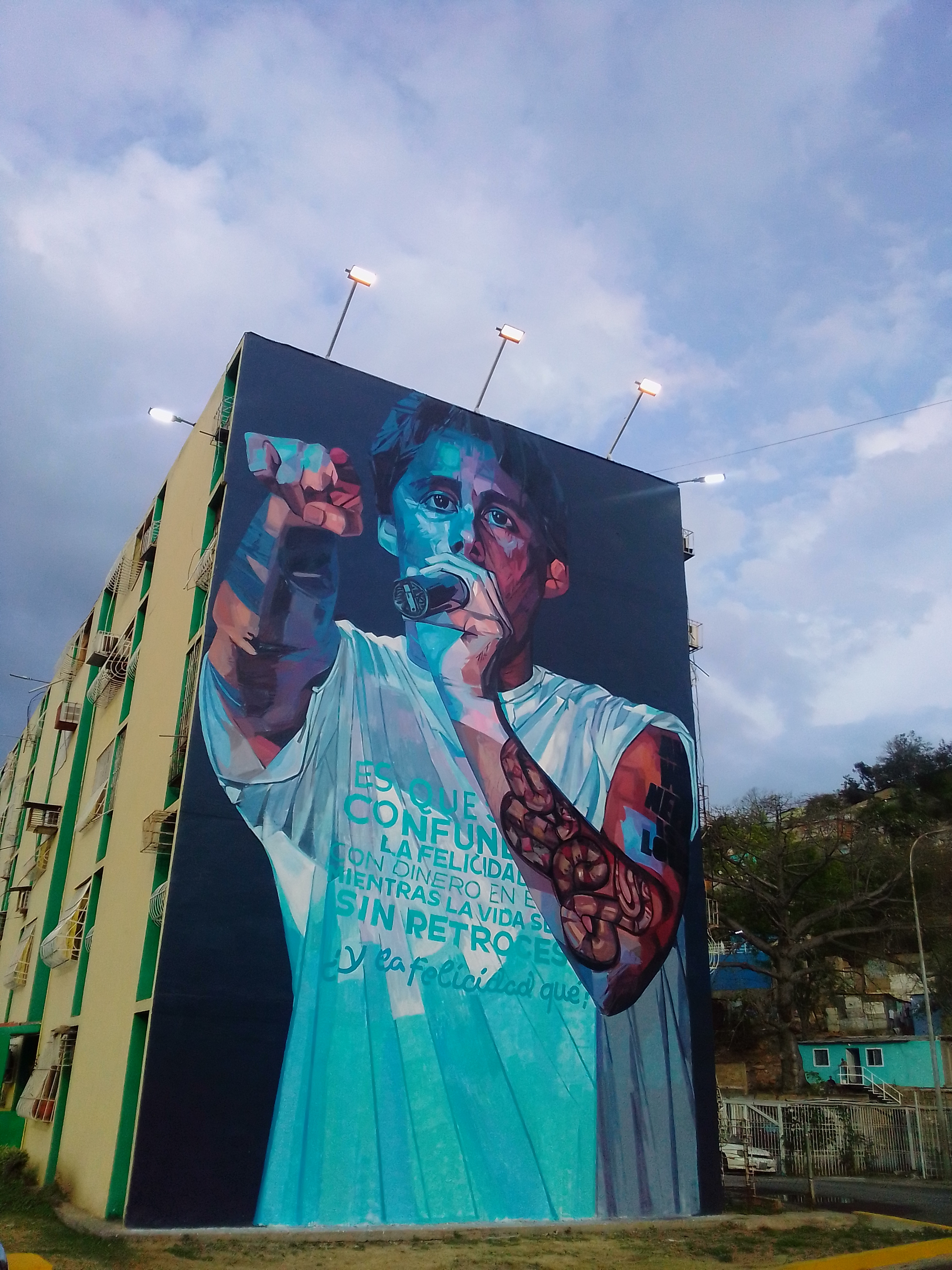
Canserbero mural in Puerto La Cruz, Anzoátegui, 2025

When the news of his death became public, several artists expressed their condolences. Puerto Rican rapper Ñengo Flow, via Instagram, offered his respects to the rapper, wishing him eternal rest and claiming that he was "one of the best lyricists who raised hip hop in Venezuela and in the world." Rapper Arcángel noted that “Canserbero was one of, or perhaps the best, rappers in Latin America." Rapper Chyno Nyno expressed: "I truly can't believe this and I didn't even get to meet him in person. My deepest condolences to all his family and close friends. One of the best MCs in the history of Spanish-language hip hop." Spanish rapper and singer Mala Rodríguez, via Twitter, posted that: "Tyrone has left us because he is an angel."

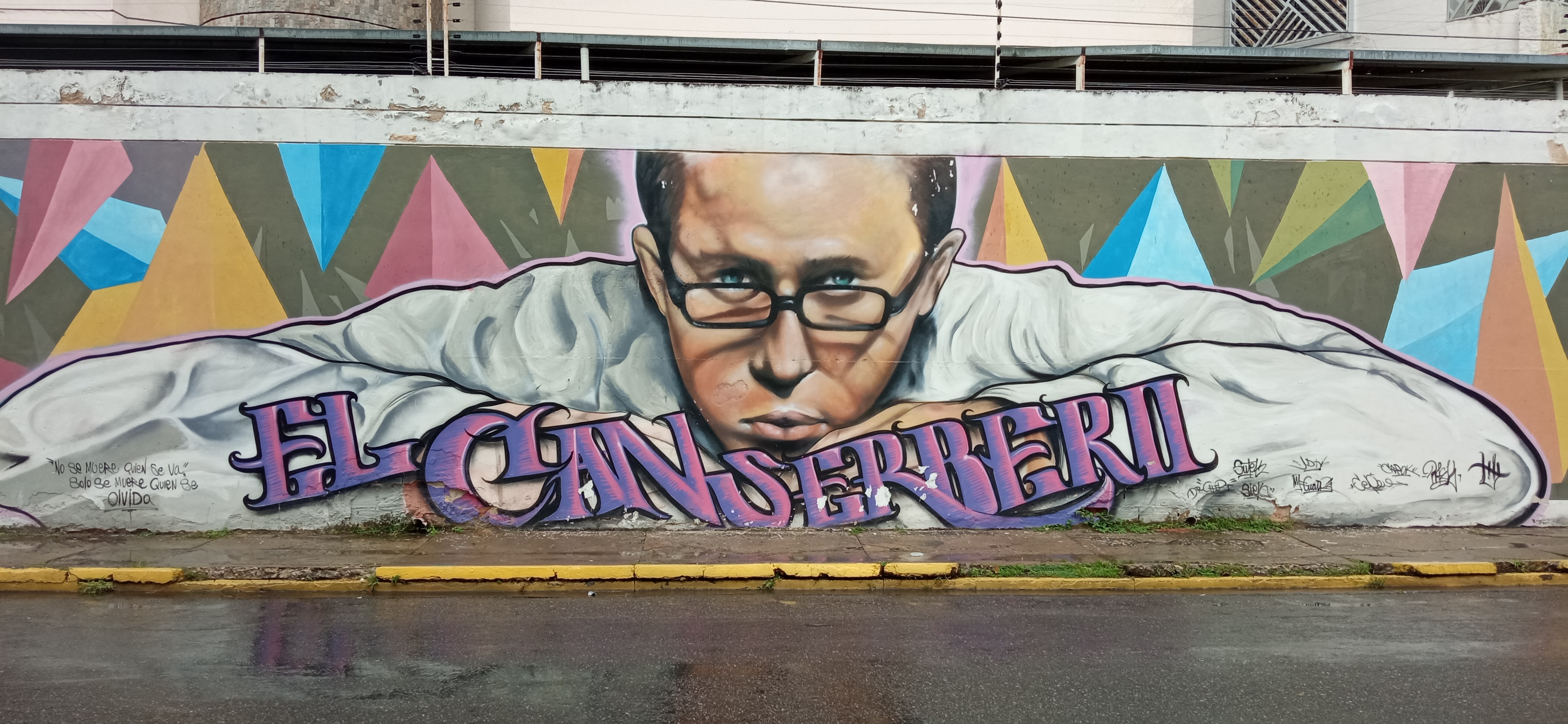
Canserbero's graffiti on Las Delicas Avenue in Maracay, 2021

Puerto Rican rapper Residente wore a T-shirt with Canserbero's face in his tribute video for his song "Rap Bruto" featuring Nach. Venezuelan rapper Akapellah, in his song "Réplica", mentions: "Where I come from, it wasn't common to be a rapper, nobody had made it, until Canserbero came along." Puerto Rican rapper Tempo, in an interview, commented: "Do you know how many people would have loved for Canserbero to mention them in a song?" referring to the song "Jeremías 17-5." Puerto Rican rapper Almighty released a song titled "La Muerte" in his honor. The song is a cover of "C'est la mort" from the studio album Muerte.

In January 2021, six years after his death, an unreleased song by the rapper titled "Horror Stories" was leaked via YouTube.

In 2023, the American magazine Rolling Stone made a list of the "50 greatest rappers in the history of Spanish-language rap", placing him at number one:

"With profound lyrics, an unmistakable voice and an attitude of solid authenticity, Canserbero needed little time to become one of the emblematic figures of rap in Latin America. His songs tell complex and dark stories. They are thoughtful reflections on life, death, injustice and the streets."

There was a rumor that an exclusive Netflix documentary called All We Need Is Love, about his life and artistic career, was going to be released in January 2024. On social media, mainly on TikTok, a teaser trailer announcing the arrival of the documentary began to spread, as well as two advertising posters; but it was later revealed that both advertisements were not official.

On 1 December 2023, producers Cayro Music, NicoJP, and Santa Suerte Music released the music video "Bendecidos" via YouTube. The song featured collaborations with Norick, Foyone, Solitario Mondragón, Akapellah, Santa Fe Klan, Alemán, Al2 El Aldeano, Toño Lizárraga, and Kase.O. Part of Canserbero's voice and face were created with artificial intelligence.

On 25 February 2024, the Mexican production company Whisky Content with Juan Bernardo González, Arturo Pereyra and the Venezuelan journalist Luis Olavarrieta, premiered via YouTube, the first chapter of a documentary that deals with the life and death of the rapper. "This project is in honor of his life and work. We immerse ourselves in his world to capture the essence of who he was and the impact he left on the music scene. We hope that this documentary inspires and moves all those who see it”, said Olavarrieta. The first episode of the documentary, titled "El Origen", is based on Canserbero's beginnings. From his birth, through the complex relationship with his family, to his first musical influences.

Canserbero was nominated for the 2024 Latin Grammy Awards for Best Rap/Hip Hop Song for the song "La Sabia Escuela", featuring Akapellah and Lil Supa. The song is featured on Akapellah's 2024 studio album Pedro Elías . Canserbero's part is from an unreleased recording contributed by music producer Afromak, who produced the song with GBEC.

In 2026, the acting president of Venezuela, Delcy Rodríguez, announced the declaration of March 11 as National Rap Day in Venezuela; a date that coincides with Canserbero’s birthday.

== Murder ==
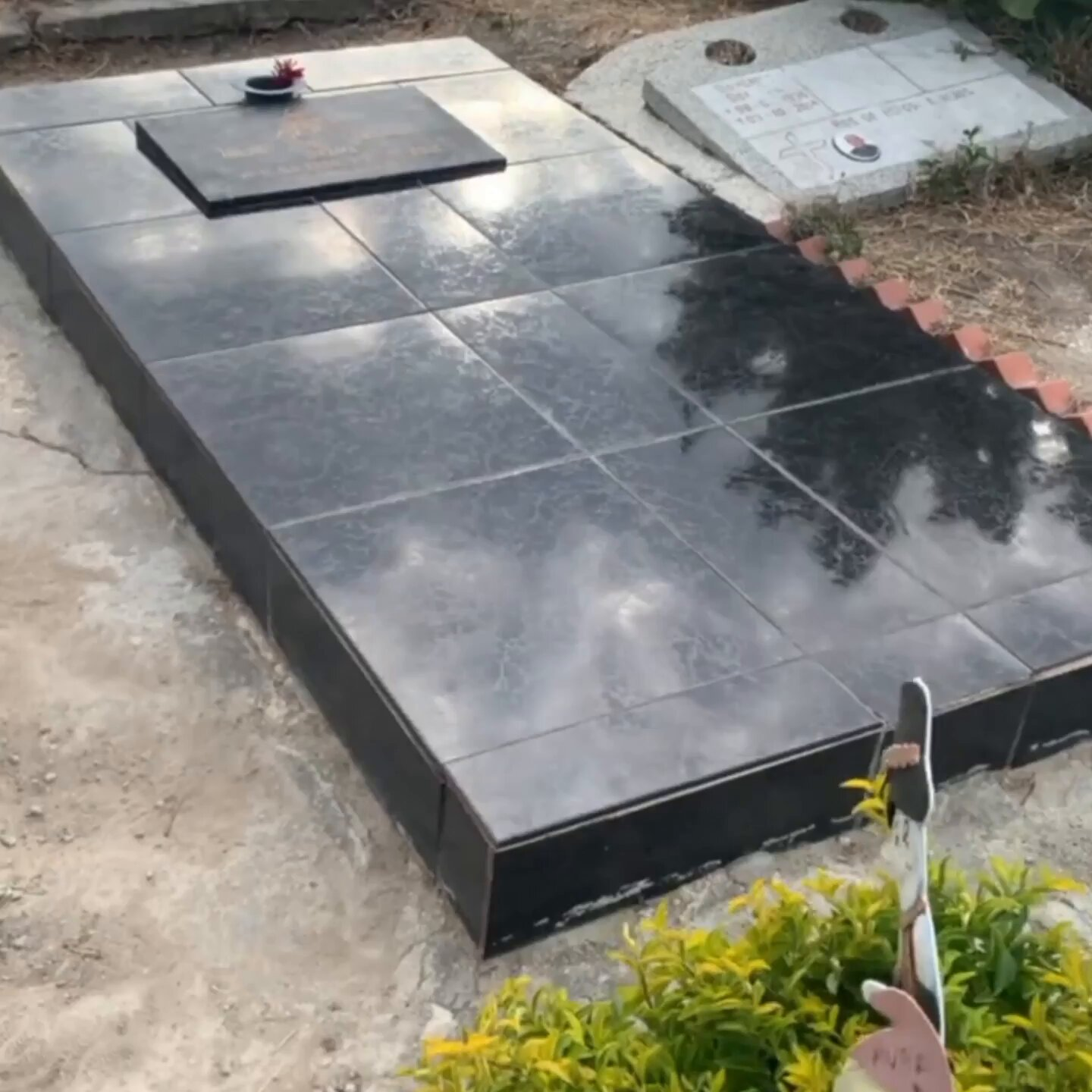
Canserbero's tomb, photographed in 2023, in the Metropolitan Cemetery of Maracay. His epitaph reads "Neither more nor less"

=== Discovery and first investigation ===
On 20 January 2015, Canserbero was found dead, presumably by a passer-by in front of his apartment building. The artist fell from the tenth floor of the Camino Real building in the Andrés Bello urbanization in Maracay. Initially, some of his close friends maintained that the artist stayed in the apartment of bassist Carlos Molnar, a friend and co-worker, since he had schizophrenia. Molnar was killed that same day by stabbing. On the other hand, the Ombudsman of Venezuela, Tarek William Saab, in March of the same year, reopened the case, since there were other additional details that straighten some hypotheses of the "witnesses". The first hypothesis is based on the fact that the kitchen window was made of romanillas and all the glasses were previously removed, which causes intrigue, given the "presumed" psychotic state in which Canserbero was used at the time of launching. [Quote required] "Having taken the romanillas out of the window indicates method, not despair," says the defender, who relies on the sisters' testimony to indicate that the romanillas were not at the time of Canserbero's fall, "but someone put them back later", he said.

While depressed (although family members stated that he did not have any mental illness), he was asked by Carlos Molnar, bassist for Zion TPL, to stay with him.

It was long alleged that Canserbero had stabbed Molnar to death and then jumped to his own death from the tenth floor of the building. However, several members of his family expressed several doubts regarding the police investigation, culminating in the reopening of the case on 11 November 2023 by the Public Ministry of Venezuela.

=== Second investigation and confession ===
On 26 December 2023, the case was confirmed by the Public Ministry to be a double homicide committed by Tirone's former manager Natalia Améstica and her brother Guillermo Améstica, following a filmed confession by both suspects. According to Natalia, the murder reportedly stemmed from Tirone's wishes to no longer be managed by her, as well as the news that she would not be receiving payments from husband Carlos Molnar for the organization of a planned tour of Argentina and Chile.

On the night of 19 January 2015, both Tirone and Molnar were to be at Natalia Améstica's house to record videos for a concert in Panama. Natalia then intentionally drugged both Tirone and Molnar with Alpram (alprazolam, also known as Xanax) by dissolving two 0.5 mg tablets in their tea. She then proceeded to stab Molnar three times in the neck (severing his jugular vein), back, and arm. According to Natalia, she worried Tirone had witnessed the fatal stabbing of Molnar, but he was heavily sedated from the effects of the Alpram and could only manage to fall asleep on their sofa.

By then unaware, Tirone was then stabbed by Natalia twice in the side. Distressed and not knowing what to do, Natalia called brother Guillermo Améstica for help staging the situation as a murder–suicide; he later arrived accompanied by four SEBIN officials, who were bribed $10,000 to disguise the murder. Guillermo then proceeded to stab Molnar a further four times; the body of Tirone was dragged to their kitchen, where it received multiple blows to the head with a pipe. The romanilla (lattice door) of their windows was then carefully removed, and the body of Tirone thrown out of the window to simulate a suicide. Natalia fled to Chile shortly after committing the murders.

== Discography ==
=== Studio albums ===
- 2008 – Can + Zoo: Índigos
- 2009 – Guía Para La Acción
- 2010 – Vida
- 2012 – Muerte
- 2013 – Apa y Can
- 2014 – Give Me 5
