= Lil Supa =

Venezuelan rapper and composer (born 1985)

- Born: Marlon Luis Morales Santana; 8 July 1985 (age 41) (Note: Though some sources mention August 8 as his birth year July 8 has been more consistently cited See § Birthplace and nationality for more details.); Caracas, Venezuela
- Other names: Lil Supa, Lou Fresco, NEØN, Marc Ginale, Mista Uanteik, Little Zoo, Madzilla
- Musical career
- Origin: Maracay, Venezuela
- Genres: Latin hip-hop; conscious rap; underground hip hop; Drumless hip hop
- Occupations: Rapper; composer
- Years active: 2000–present
- Label: VinilH Records

Marlon Luis Morales Santana (born August 8, 1985), known professionally as Lil Supa, is a Venezuelan rapper, composer, and street artist. In 2024, he was ranked number 17 as one of the "50 great rappers in the history of rap in Spanish" by the American magazine Rolling Stone. Throughout his career he has used several pseudonyms.

== Early life and career ==
Morales was born in Caracas and lived in Maracay. He started his involvement in hip-hop as a breakdancer and graffiti artist in the late 1990s, influenced by street culture in both cities. He co-founded the "Supremacy Hip Hop Clan" with Dann Niggaz and Afromak and became a co-founder of the label VinilH Records. His early career was shaped by his participation in various hip-hop groups and collectives, including Bas.y.Co, and FUNDaMENTORS.

In 2009, he performed at concerts in Colombia with the Madzilla project. He collaborated on Canserbero's album Vida (2010). Four years later, he collaborated with rapper Apache on his album Original Combination (2014).

In 2017, he released his album Serio, which brought him widespread recognition and which he promoted on his third European tour performing a show at the Hip Hop Al Parque Festival in Colombia.

In 2020, he released NEON, recorded in Caracas from his cell phone and produced by Drama Theme, Oldtape, Sanabria, Nico JP and Kpu. That year he also released the album Funky Fresco with Akapellah and collaborated on Apache's album Apache.

In 2023, he wrote the original song for the Venezuelan national football team, La Vinotinto, “Nunca menos”, together with Akapellah.

In January 2024, he was ranked 17th by Rolling Stone as one of the 50 greatest Spanish-language rappers. Following this, he began his Otra Vez Tour in Colombia, performing in Spain, Chile, Argentina, and Colombia. He was nominated for a Latin Grammy Award in the Best Rap/Hip Hop Song category for "La sabia escuela" in 2024.

== Discography ==
- Supremacy HipHop Clan: Simplemente Underground (2003) with Dann Niggaz
- BAS.Y.CO: Base y Contenido (2006) with BAS.Y.CO
- Vida Bandida: ill Mixtape Venezuela (2007/2008) with BAS.Y.CO
- Can + Zoo: Índigos (2008) with Canserbero
- MadZiLLa: Uanteik Mixtape (2009) with DJ MadPee
- SenciLLo (2011)
- Supremacy HipHop Clan: Da' HipHopaddictz (2011) with Dann Niggaz
- MadZiLLa: Uanteik "Como en los 90'S", Vol.2 (2011) with DJ MadPee y Ray One
- Claro-EP (2012)
- Serio (2017)
- HECATOMBE (2018) with La Maldita Infamia
- ERA (2019) with Ray One
- Wiz (2019) with N-Wise Allah
- AMVISION-EP (2020) with Willie DeVille
- NEØN (2020)
- Funky Fresco (2020) with Akapellah
- Oceánica-EP (2020) with Elio Toffana y Dano Ziontifik
- C.R.A.C.K (2021) with Jonas Sanche
- Ritual the Mixtape (2021) with NastyKillah y Rial Guanwankó
- EL BLOKE (2021) with Doktor Rheal
- YEYO (2022)
- ÑAPA (2022)
- METAL (2023) with 3m5 Y Nichess One
- "REC A LIL" (2024) with Recognize Ali
- METAL II (2024) with 3m5 y Nichess One
- Supremacy HipHop Clan: ÍCONOS (2024) with Dann Niggaz
- ANIMAL (2025)
