= Multishow ao Vivo: Vanessa da Mata =

Live album by Vanessa da Mata
- Released: 2009
- Recorded: Paraty, Brazil
- Genre: MPB

Vanessa da Mata chronology
Sim (2007)	Multishow ao Vivo: Vanessa da Mata (2009)	Bicicletas, Bolos e Outras Alegrias (2010)

Multishow ao Vivo: Vanessa da Mata is a live album and DVD from Brazilian singer Vanessa da Mata, produced by the channel Multishow.

Multishow ao Vivo was recorded live at the historic town of Paraty, and brings in the repertoire songs that marked the career of da Mata, including "Não me Deixe So", "Ai, Ai, Ai", "Eu Sou Neguinha", and "Vermelho", in addition to the song "Acode" (composed by da Mata), remakes of "Um Dia, Um Adeus" (Guilherme Arantes), and "As Rosas Não Falam" (Cartola). "As Rosas Não Falam" featured guitarist Rogério Caetano.

== Track listing ==
1. Baú
2. Vermelho
3. Quando Um Homem Tem Uma Mangueira no Quintal
4. Ilegais
5. Ainda Bem
6. Amado
7. Fugiu Com A Novela
8. Um Dia, um Adeus
9. Viagem / Mamãe Passou Açúcar Em Mim
10. Não Me Deixe Só
11. Você Vai Me Destruir
12. Ai, Ai, Ai
13. As Rosas Não Falam
14. Boa Sorte / Good Luck

== Certifications ==
Certifications
Region	Certification	Certified units/sales
Brazil (Pro-Música Brasil)	Gold	50,000^{*}
^{*} Sales figures based on certification alone.
