= Choka Choka =

2026 single by Anitta and Shakira

Single by Anitta and Shakira

from the album Equilibrium
- Language: Portuguese; Spanish
- Released: 10 April 2026
- Genre: EDM; afrobeat; macumbeat
- Length: 2:11
- Label: Republic
- Composers: Tiago Da Cal Alves; Daniel Aponte Otero; Alessandra Francesca Bregante; Hyonvane Gilberto Mendoza; Abraham Olaleye; Daniel Rondon
- Lyricists: Kevyn Mauricio Cruz; Larissa de Macedo Machado; Shakira Mebarak
- Producers: Daramola; Papatinho

Anitta singles chronology
"La testa gira" (2026)	"Choka Choka" (2026)	"Goals" (2026)

Shakira singles chronology
"Algo Tú" (2026)	"Choka Choka" (2026)	"Dai Dai" (2026)

Music video
- "Choka Choka" on YouTube

"Choka Choka" is a song recorded by Brazilian singer Anitta and Colombian singer-songwriter Shakira. It was released on 10 April 2026 as the second single from Anitta's eighth studio album, Equilibrium. A funk carioca track with urban and electronic influences, it was produced by Daramola and Papatinho. "Choka Choka" highlights the Spanish-language and traditional Brazilian styles.

== Meaning of the title ==
According to Folha de S.Paulo, the title "Choka Choka" is an expression used to describe a situation where something is exaggerated or intense, reflecting the song's danceable energy.

== Live performances ==
On 11 April 2026, Anitta performed the song live for the first time on Saturday Night Live (hosted by Colman Domingo).

Shakira and Anitta performed the song together at Todo Mundo no Rio for an audience of 2.5 million people on May 2, 2026.

== Commercial performance ==
On 11 April 2026, the song debuted at number 3 on the Spotify Top 50 chart in Brazil.

== Charts ==
=== Weekly charts ===
Weekly chart performance
Chart (2026)	Peak position
Brazil Hot 100 (Billboard)	17
El Salvador Airplay (Monitor Latino)	5
Paraguay Airplay (Monitor Latino)	16
Portugal (AFP)	66
US Latin Digital Song Sales (Billboard)	5
Venezuela Airplay (Record Report)	12

=== Monthly charts ===
Monthly chart performance
Chart (2026)	Peak position
Paraguay Airplay (SGP)	36

== Release history ==
Release history for "Choka Choka"
Region	Date	Format	Label	Ref.
Various	10 April 2026	Digital download; streaming	Republic	
Italy	10 April 2026	Radio airplay	Island	
