= Kevin Aguilar (singer) =

Mexican singer and songwriter

Aguilar at the 2026 Latin Grammys

Kevin Aguilar (born 2011, in Mexico City, Mexico) is a Mexican singer and songwriter who specializes in ranchera and Mexican regional music. In 2022, Aguilar garnered national attention in Mexico as the winner of La Voz Kids México as part of Mau y Ricky's team. He was nominated for the Best New Artist Award at the 2024 Latin Grammys.

Aguilar performed at Univision's 2025 Premios Juventud in Miami, Florida.

== Discography ==
- Nací para Cantar (2024)
