= J Noa =

Dominican rapper (born 2005)

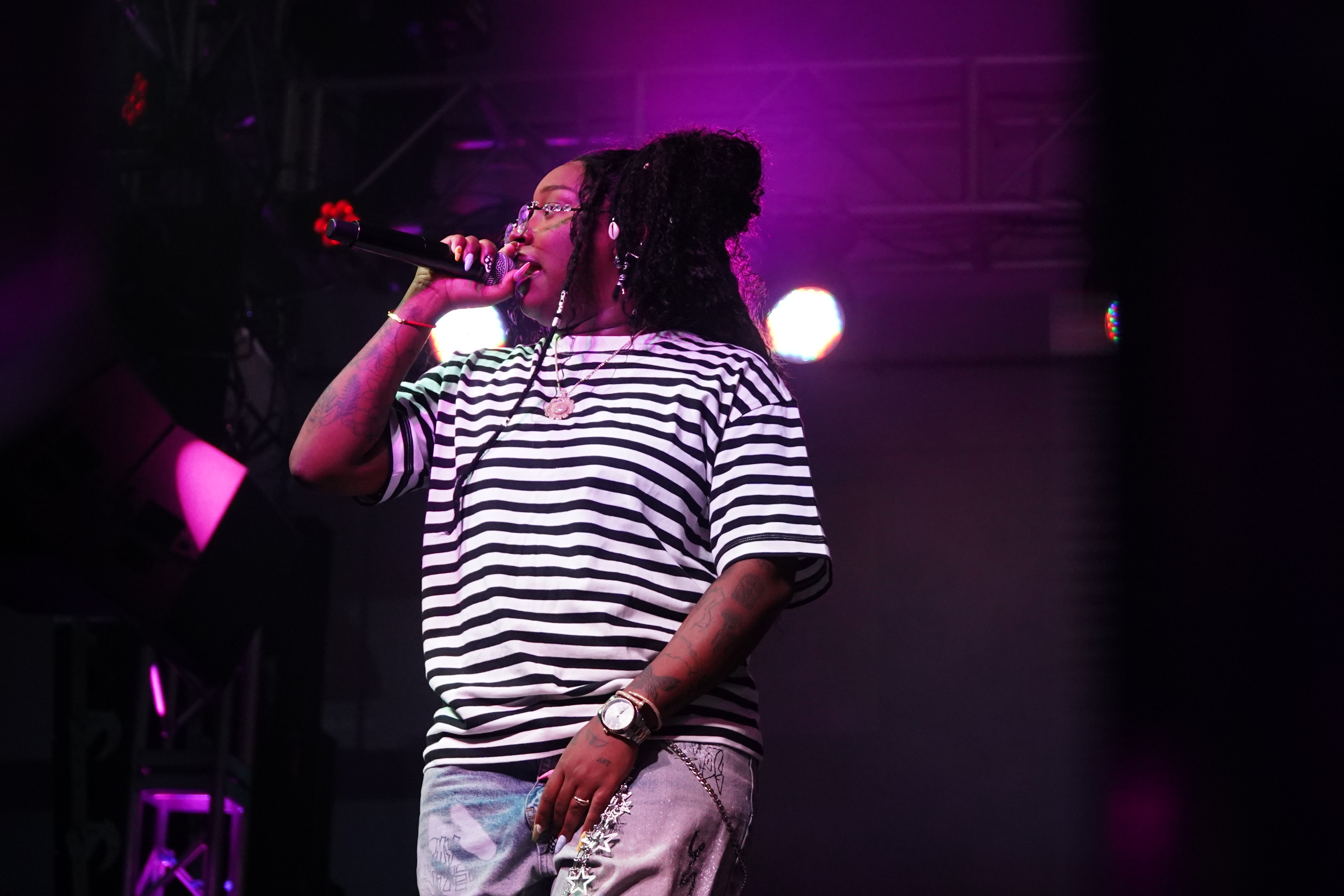
- J Noa performs at San Francisco State University's 14th Rhythms Music Festival in May 2025.

Background information
- Born: Nohelys Jiménez; October 17, 2005 (age 21); San Cristóbal, Dominican Republic
- Origin: Dominican Republic
- Genres: Hip-hop; trap; dancehall; reggaeton
- Occupations: Rapper; singer; songwriter
- Years active: 2021–present
- Label: Sony Music

Nohelys Jiménez (born October 17, 2005), known professionally as J Noa, is a Dominican rapper, singer, and songwriter from San Cristóbal.

Jiménez rose to prominence in 2021 after her YouTube freestyle session, "Freestyle #05 (temp. 3)" with DJ Scuff, gained popularity. Her debut studio album, Autodidacta, released in 2023, received positive reviews despite failing to chart. Jiménez was nominated for Best Rap/Hip Hop Song at the 24th Annual Latin Grammy Awards and for Female New Artist at the Premio Lo Nuestro 2024.

== Early life ==
Nohelys Jiménez was born and raised in San Cristóbal, Dominican Republic. She began her music career in childhood, composing her own songs at the age of eight. She met local musicians from a band in her hometown, San Cristóbal, and started performing with them.

== Career ==
J Noa begin her musical career in 2020. She gained popularity after her YouTube freestyle session, "Freestyle #05 (temp. 3)" with DJ Scuff, garnered attention. J Noa released her debut extended play, Mi Barrio, on October 24, 2022, featuring four songs. After the EP release, she released the single "Qué Due?" on November 4, 2022. In 2023, she released the hit single "Betty" on January 20, this was followed by "No Me Pueden Parar" on March 24. On May 26, 2023, J Noa released her debut studio album, Autodidacta. J Noa released "SPICY" in November, along with a music video. In 2024, she released the singles: "Era De Cristal" on February 8 alongside a music video. J Noa released the singles "Hasta Cuando" on March 28, "Cenicienta" on April 18, alongside a music video, and "Arrogante (A COLORS SHOW)" on May 6. On May 30, 2024, J Noa released her second studio album, Mátense Por La Corona.

== Discography ==
=== Albums ===
List of albums, with selected details
Title	Album details
Mi Barrio (EP)	Released: October 24, 2022; Label: Sony Music, US Latin LLC; Formats: Digital download, streaming
Autodidacta	Released: May 26, 2023; Label: Sony Music, US Latin LLC; Formats: Digital download, streaming
Mátense Por La Corona	Released: May 30, 2024; Label: Sony Music, US Latin LLC; Formats: Digital download, streaming

== Awards and nominations ==
Award	Year	Category	Nominated work	Result	Ref.
Heat Latin Music Awards	2024	Musical Promise	J Noa	Nominated	
Latin Grammy Awards	2023	Best Rap/Hip Hop Song	"Autodidacta"	Nominated	
Premios Juventud	2024	The New Generation – Female	J Noa	Nominated	
Premio Lo Nuestro	2024	New Artist – Female	J Noa	Nominated	
