= Ijexá =

Quaternary rhythm of African origin

Ijexá is a quaternary rhythm of African origin rooted in the Yoruba cultural traditions of West Africa. It serves as a fundamental musical pillar within Candomblé, where it accompanies ritual songs and dances dedicated to the Orishas, and has strongly influenced Afro-Brazilian popular music.

== Characteristics ==
The rhythm is characterized by its lively energy and its use of syncopation, specifically, the displacement of emphasis onto weaker or unexpected beats. Ijexá was traditionally practiced in religious temples called terreiros and was long considered restricted ritual knowledge reserved solely for initiated practitioners but as time went on Ijexá expanded beyond religious contexts and entered the public life of Brazil through carnival and the afoxés. The commercialization and secularization of Ijexá as it entered the public eye continues to spark ongoing debates within Candomblé communities.

Ijexá relies on a rhythmic pattern known as claves for organization and guidance of its ensemble. A clave is typically performed by a single, high pitched instrument, usually the agogô, which establishes the rhythm that the other instruments follow. Unlike European-derived musical traditions that often rely on evenly divided notes, the Ijexá clave is conceptualized asymmetrically, allowing for more flexible rhythmic subdivision.

== History ==
=== Religious foundation in Candomblé ===
Ijexá originates in the religious musical practices of Candomblé, the Afro-Brazilian religion rooted in Yoruba traditions brought to Brazil through the transatlantic slave trade and as such is influenced by and dedicated to the Yoruba orishas. Its name derives from a geographical region in Ilesha, Nigeria whose cultural memory was preserved in Bahia, Brazil.

Ijexá was traditionally performed solely in the terreiros, the religious temples where Candomblé is worshipped, and was considered sacred knowledge. The rhythm was not intended for entertainment or public display and was intentionally restricted to initiated practitioners of Candomblé in order to protect it from external appropriation.

=== Transition from Terreiro to the streets of Brazil ===
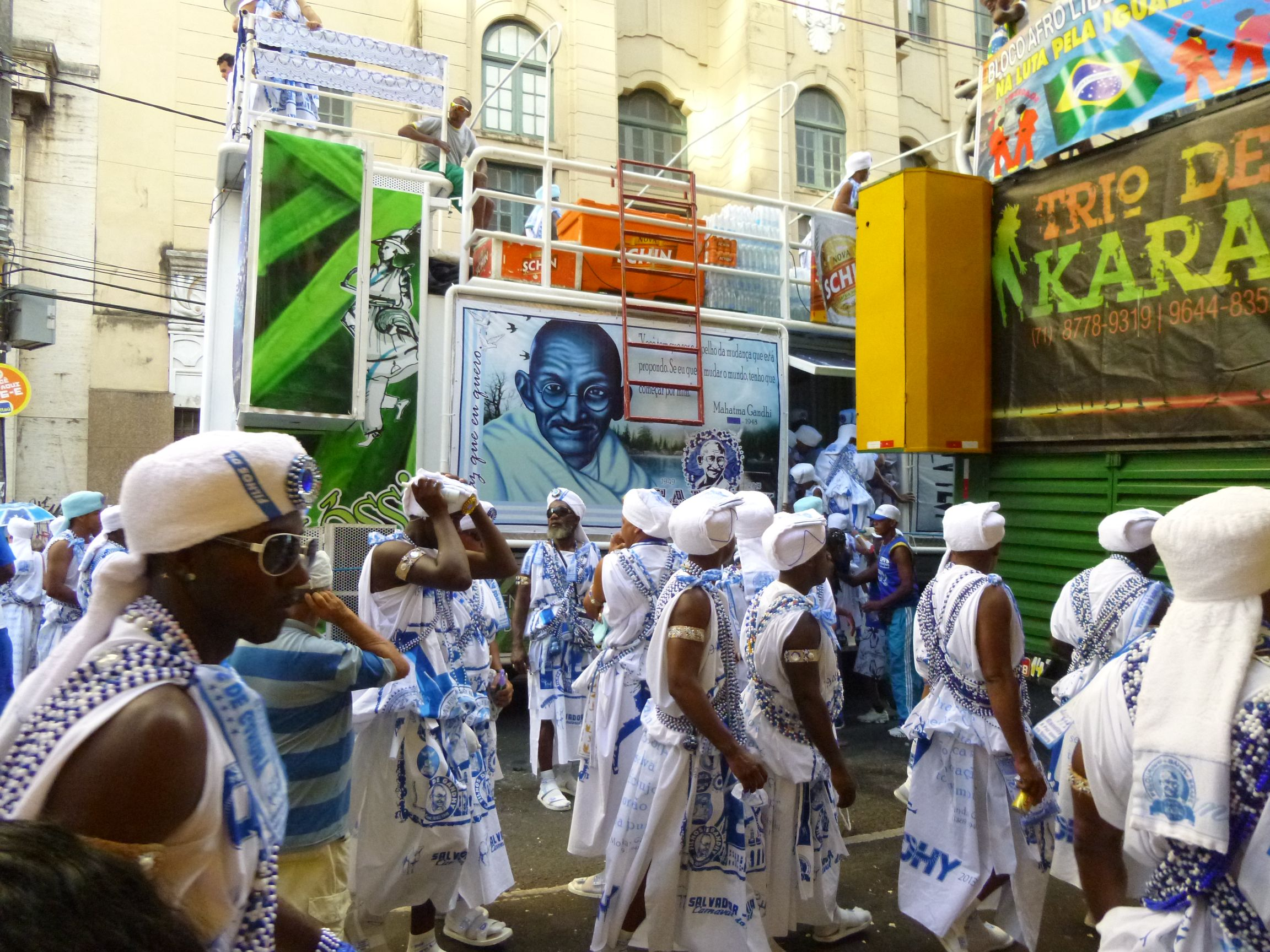
Filhos de Gandhy afoxé during Brazilian Carnival in Salvador, Bahia 2013

Following Brazil's abolition of slavery in 1888, followers of Candomblé began bringing sacred Ijexá rhythms, chants, and symbols into street parades that remained deeply linked to the religious traditions of Candomblé. Although Ijexá originated as a strictly ritual rhythm, during the twentieth century it increasingly entered, although at a small scale, the public sphere through organized carnival parades. These public parades grew to be known as afoxés and gave rise to candomblé de rua (street Candomblé), the only carnival form directly connected to Candomblé. While Ijexá and afoxé refer to distinct concepts, one describing the musical rhythm and the other describing the performative organization, their close historical relationship has led many to frequently, though incorrectly, use them as synonyms.

In 1949, as a form of rebellion against the Brazilian government's repression of labor unions, Vava Madeira and fellow union members founded the carnival block Filhos de Gandhy, which today represents the largest and most popular afoxé of the carnival in Salvador da Bahia, and has included artists such as Gilberto Gil, Gerônimo, Xanddy Harmonia, Carlinhos Brown, and Tonho Materia. Filhos de Gandhy are recognized today as the catalysts for the renaissance of Afro-centrism in carnival and played a pivotal role in preserving Ijexá outside of the terreiro without stripping it of its spiritual authenticity.

=== Secularization and Ijexá's introduction to Brazilian popular music (MPB) ===
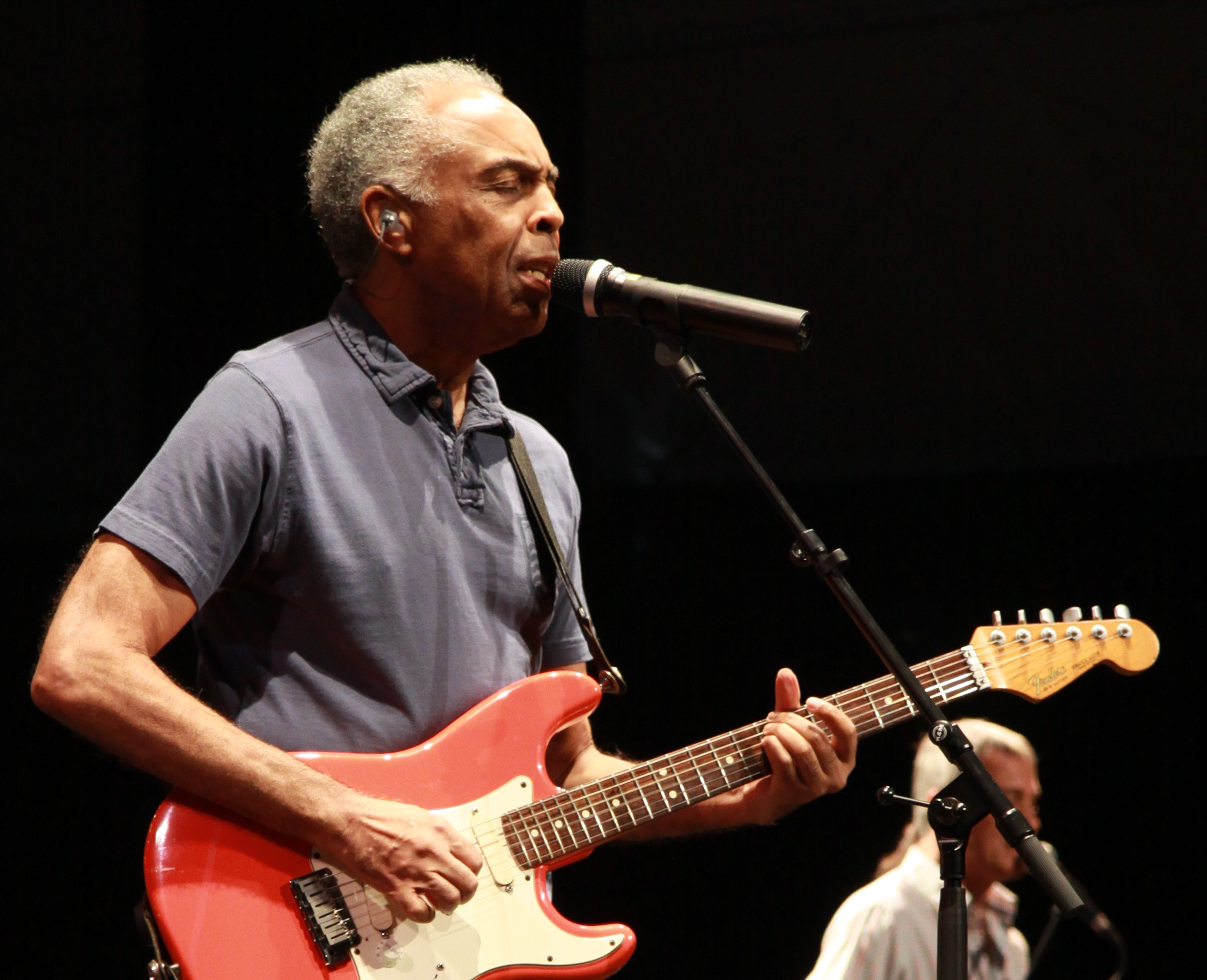
Gilberto Gil performing at the Festival de Cornouaille in 2010

The 1970s marked a turning point in the history of Ijexá, coinciding with what scholars describe as the re-Africanization of carnival in Salvador. During this period the Afro-Brazilian community began reclaiming their African heritage as a source of political and cultural empowerment. Ijexá, already established publicly in afoxé, became a symbolic bridge between religious ancestry and contemporary black consciousness movements. This turning point came with the contextual expansion of Ijexá. It was no longer strictly connected to Candomblé ritual, which allowed it to circulate among broader audiences. A key figure in the process of integrating Ijexá into Brazilian popular music was Gilberto Gil, whose 1977 album Refavela explored African and Afro-Brazilian themes pushing forward a cultural renaissance. Refavela included recordings of afoxés and by extension Ijexá, bringing the rhythm to a national audience.

=== Internal disagreement about secularization amongst Candomblé practitioners ===
As Ijexá became more popular, an internal debate arose within the Candomblé community. Many traditionalist, often older, practitioners of Candomblé expressed concern about the secularization and commercialization of Ijexá for several reasons. They argued that because Ijexá functions as a way to communicate with the orishas, that bringing the sacred rhythm out of the terreiro and onto the streets of Brazil risked desacralizing Candomblé. Furthermore, they contended that framing Candomblé as a product to be sold to tourists reduces it to a one-dimensional spectacle, stripping it of its spiritual, historical, and cultural depth.

Conversely, younger members of the community argued that the spread of Ijexá was ultimately positive. They argued that being able to earn a living while promoting Black pride and Candomblé values to a broader audience was beneficial, with some even viewing it as a form of reparations long denied to Black communities. These younger practitioners believed that Ijexá was no longer solely a religious rhythm and that the music could evolve without diminishing their personal devotion to Candomblé.

== Instruments ==
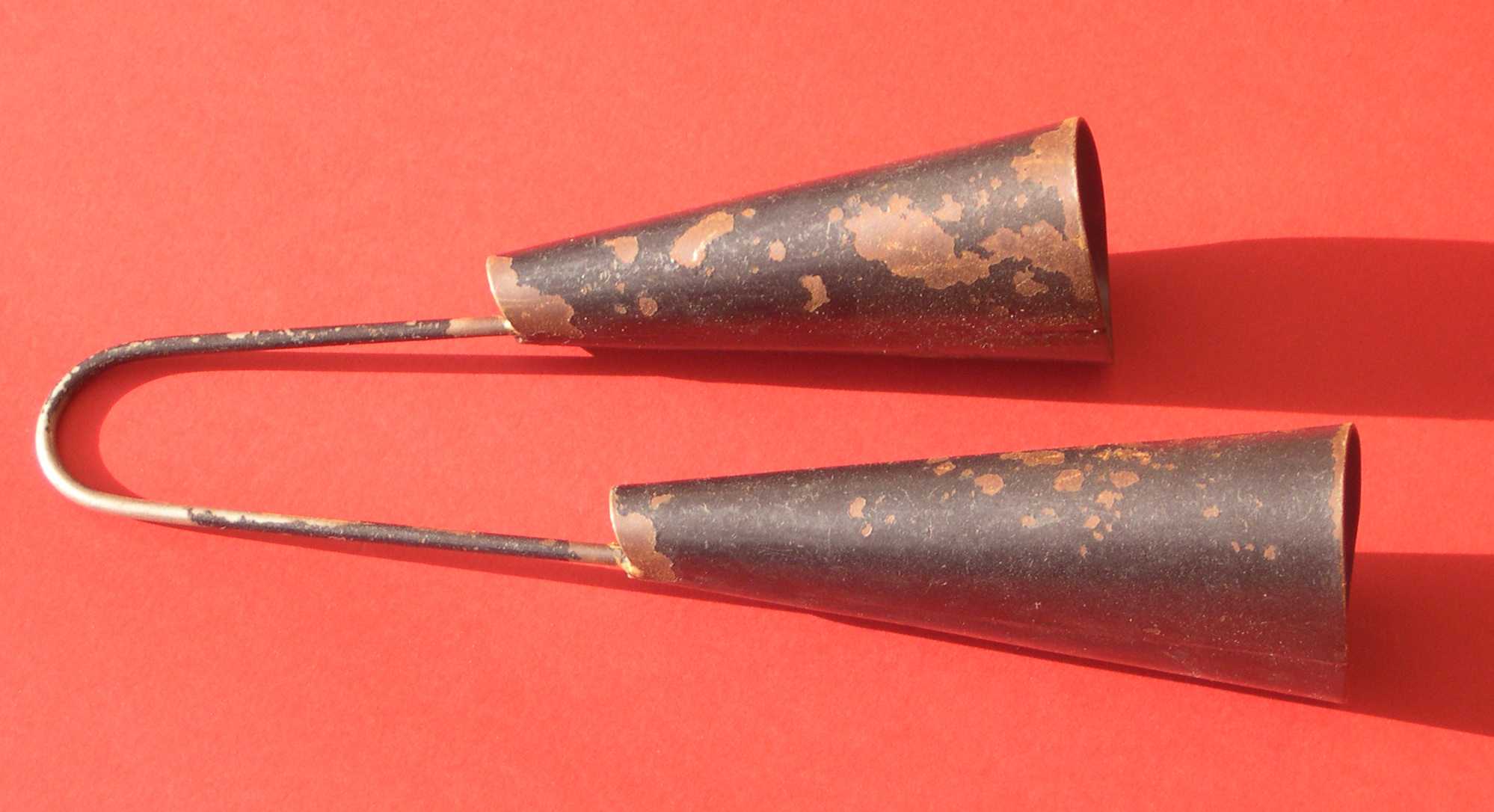
Agogô

There are four primary types of instruments used in the Ijexá rhythm: the agogô, the atabaques, the agbê also referred to as afoxé (note: different from the public parades referred to as afoxé), and, in secular contexts, the caxixi.

=== Agogô ===
A percussive idiophone consisting of one or two metal bells, responsible for establishing the clave. While it is commonly industrially produced, it may also be replaced by its iron counterpart, the gan.

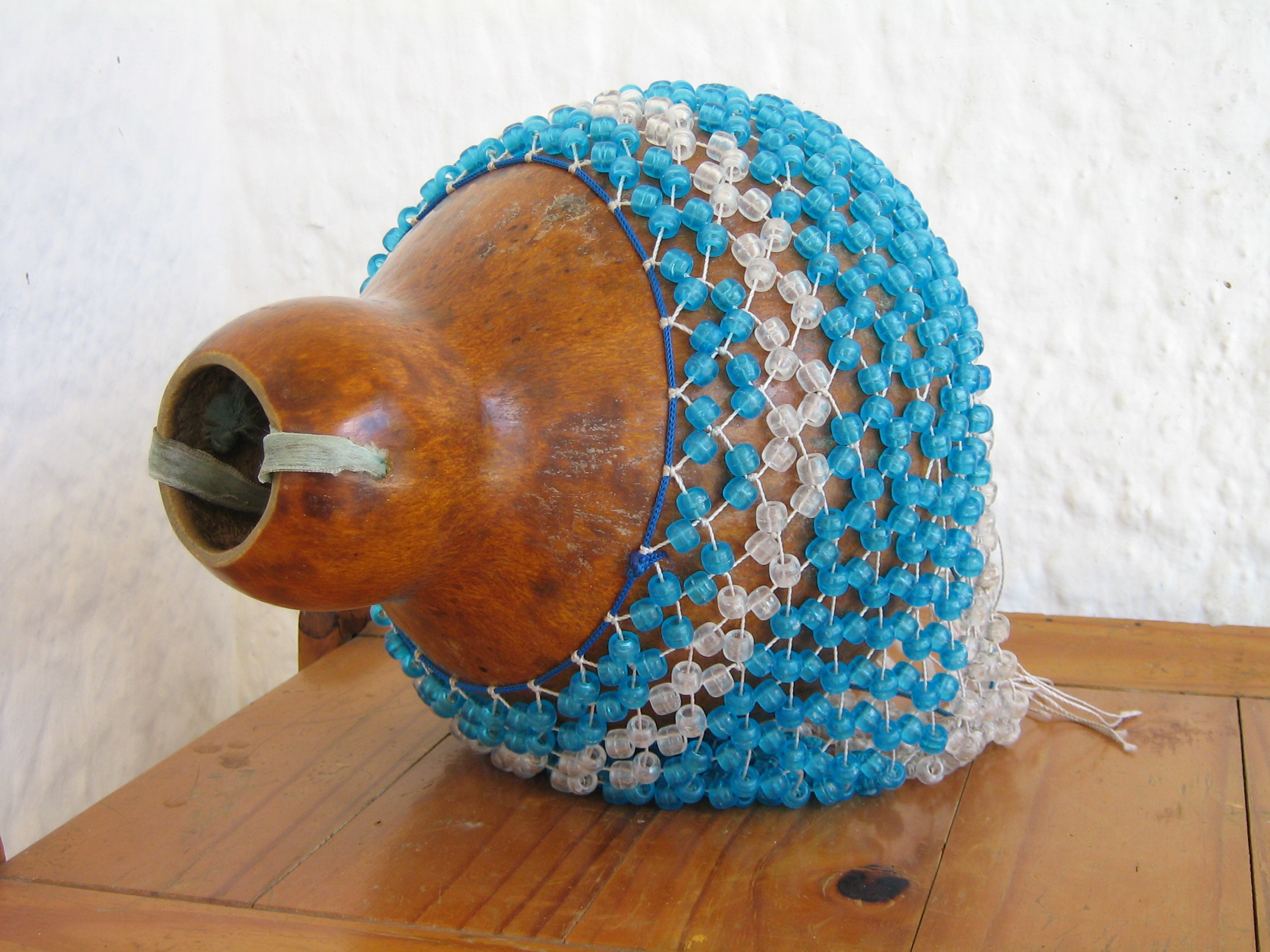
Agbê

=== Atabaques ===
Cylindrical, single headed drums made from wood with animal skin stretched over the top, functioning as the batter head, positioned upright.

- Rum: the largest and lowest pitched drum, functioning as the master drum, responsible for leading the ensemble and performing rhythmic improvisations.
- Rumpi: a medium-sized drum that maintains a steady rhythm
- Lé: the smallest and highest pitched drum, also responsible for maintaining a constant rhythm.

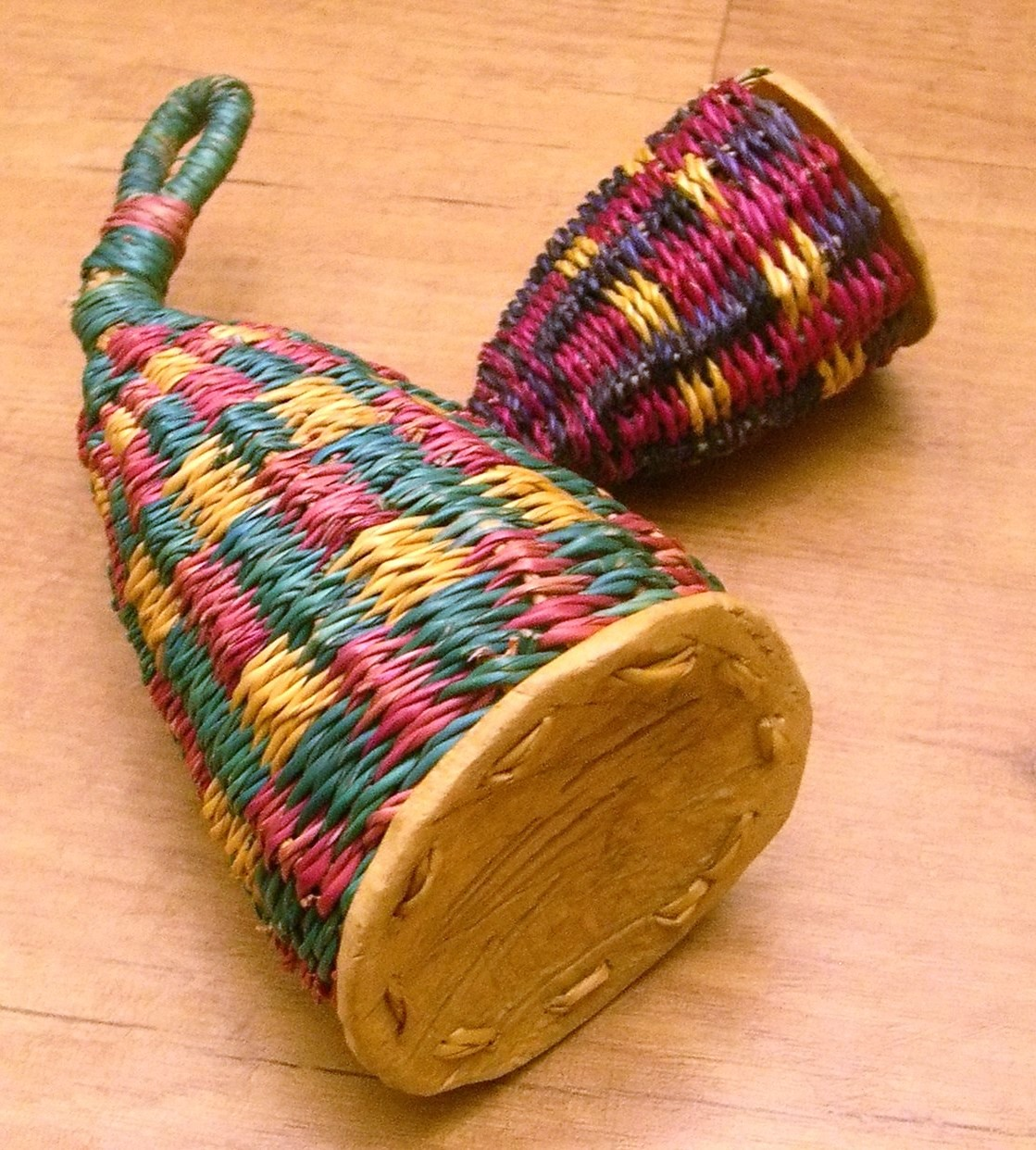
Caxixi

=== Agbê (Afoxé) ===
A musical instrument made from dried gourd covered with a net of beads or seeds. When shaken, the beads rub against the gourd producing a rasping percussive sound.

=== Caxixi ===
A small woven basket rattle, often used in secular settings to maintain a regular metric pulse, functioning similarly to a maraca.
