= Sofi Saar =

Sofi Saar (born Monterrey, Nueva León, Mexico) is a Mexican singer and musician who specializes in a fusion of pop and Norteño music called "popteño". Sarr was nominated for the Best New Artist Award and the Best Norteño Album Award at the 2024 Latin Grammy Awards. In 2025, she was named an Artista Rompe by Amazon Music Mexico.

== Early life ==
Saar wrote her first song at age nine. She cites her parents listening to artists like Kumbia Kings, Selena, Intocable, and Duelo in forming her interest in pop and Mexican regional music. Her songs include typical Norteño instruments like the accordion, bajo sexto, and the docerola 12-string guitar.

== Discography ==
- Terca (2024)

In a 2025 interview with Rolling Stone en Español, Saar confirmed that she is working on second album 50/50 scheduled to be released in March 2026. For this album, Saar is working with producer Adrián Navarro.
