= Sim (album) =

Studio album by Vanessa da Mata
- Released: May 28, 2007
- Recorded: at AR Studios (Rio de Janeiro) and Anchor Studios (Kingston, Jamaica)
- Genre: MPB
- Label: Sony BMG
- Producers: Mario Caldato, Kassin

Vanessa da Mata chronology
Essa Boneca Tem Manual (2004)	Sim (2007)	Multishow Ao Vivo: Vanessa da Mata (2009)

Professional ratings
Review scores
Source	Rating
Allmusic	4/5 stars

Sim is the third album by Brazilian singer-songwriter Vanessa da Mata, released on May 28, 2007, by Sony BMG. It was partially recorded at Kingston, Jamaica with musicians Sly & Robbie. It spawned the hit single "Boa Sorte/Good Luck", a duet with Ben Harper, which peaked at number one in both Brazil and Portugal, and was the most played song in Brazilian radio stations in the year of 2008. The second single, "Amado", also became a number-one hit in Brazil and the 15th most played song in the same year.

== Track listing ==
1. "Vermelho" (Vanessa Da Mata) – 3:44
2. "Fugiu Com A Novela" (Vanessa Da Mata) – 3:16
3. "Baú" (Vanessa Da Mata) – 4:25
4. "Boa Sorte / Good Luck" (featuring Ben Harper) (Vanessa Da Mata/Ben Harper) – 3:55
5. "Amado" (Vanessa Da Mata/Marcelo Jeneci) – 4:11
6. "Pirraça" (Vanessa Da Mata/Kassin) – 3:25
7. "Você Vai Me Destruir" (Vanessa Da Mata Et Fernando Catatau) – 4:31
8. "Absurdo" (Vanessa Da Mata) – 3:27
9. "Quem Irá Nos Proteger?" (Vanessa Da Mata) – 3:50
10. "Ilegais" (Vanessa Da Mata) – 3:51
11. "Quando Um Homem Tem Uma Mangueira No Quintal" (Vanessa Da Mata) – 2:13
12. "Meu Deus" (Vanessa Da Mata) – 4:56
13. "Minha Herança: Uma Flor" (Vanessa Da Mata) – 3:33

== Charts ==
=== Year-end charts ===
Chart (2007)	Peak position
Brazilian Albums (Pro-Música Brasil)	4

== Certifications ==
Certifications
Region	Certification	Certified units/sales
Brazil (Pro-Música Brasil)	Platinum	100,000^{*}
^{*} Sales figures based on certification alone.
