= MPB =

MPB may refer to:

== Biology ==
- Mountain pine beetle, a barkbeetle in the US and Canada

== Health and science ==
- Male pattern baldness
- Morphotropic phase boundary, a zone e.g. in PZT ceramics
- MPB (software), an open-source package for electromagnetic analysis of periodic materials

== Companies and agencies ==
- Mississippi Public Broadcasting, US
- Maritime and Port Bureau, Taiwan
- MP Birla Group, India

== Arts and culture ==
- Monthly Playboy, Japanese edition
- Música popular brasileira, Brazilian popular music
  - MPB4, a Brazilian musical group
