= Os Garotin =

Brazilian band

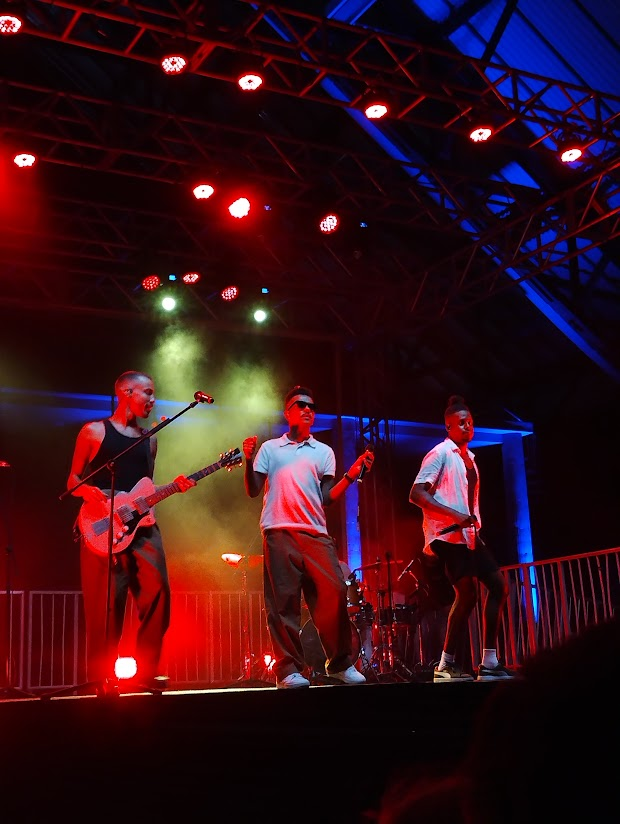
- Os Garotin performing in May 2025

Background information
- Origin: São Gonçalo, Rio de Janeiro, Brazil
- Years active: 2019-present
- Label: Universal
- Members: Léo Guima; Anchietx; Cupertino

Os Garotin are a Brazilian band from Rio de Janeiro that performs a fusion of MPB, R&B, and rap. Os Garotin were nominated for a Best New Artist Award at the 2024 Latin Grammys. Their album Os Garotin de São Gonçalo won the 2024 Latin Grammy Award for "Best Portuguese Language Contemporary Pop Album".

Os Garotin is short for "os garotinhos" or "the boys" in Portuguese.

== History ==
Os Garotin consists of musicians Anchietx (Lucas Anchieta Gonzaga Ribeiro), Cupertino (Victor Cupertino), and Leo Guima (Leonardo Guimarães). The three members grew up in São Gonçalo, Rio de Janeiro. Their first experiences making music came through their church. The formed a band in 2019.

Each member of Os Garotin brings different musical influences to the band: Leo gave a December 2024 interview saying that he references soul music, Cupertino MPB, and Anchieta R&B. The band members list Brazilian artists including Tim Maia, Cassiano, and Djavan among their influences.

== Discography ==
- 2023: EP Os Garotin Session
- 2024: Os Garotin de São Gonçalo
