= Latin Grammy Award for Best New Artist =

Annual music award

- Awarded for: Artists who establish their identity with the public
- Presented by: The Latin Recording Academy
- First award: 2000
- Currently held by: Aria Vega (2026)
- Website: latingrammy.com (in Spanish, English, and Portuguese)

The Latin Grammy Award for Best New Artist is an honor presented annually at the Latin Grammy Awards, a ceremony that recognizes excellence and creates a wider awareness of cultural diversity and contributions of Latin recording artists, nationally and internationally. The award is given to solo artists or groups that first establish an identity to the public as a performer and release a Spanish or Portuguese language recording during the period of eligibility. In 2012, the Academy announced the category (in addition to Album of the Year, Record of the Year and Song of the Year) would include ten nominees to reflect changes within the music industry.

The award for Best New Artist was first presented to the Cuban performer Ibrahim Ferrer in 2000. Benefiting from the release of the documentary Buena Vista Social Club, which launched him to stardom, Ferrer received the award at age seventy-three after being a performer for sixty years. The next three award recipients were Juanes, Jorge Moreno, and David Bisbal. In 2004, Brazilian singer Maria Rita became the first female winner. Spanish singer-songwriter Bebe announced her retirement one year after receiving the 2005 award; however, she returned to the music business five years later with the release of her second album, Y. The bands Calle 13 and Jesse & Joy won the next two awards, followed by singers Kany García, Alexander Acha, Alex Cuba, Sie7e, Mexican DJs 3Ball MTY, Gaby Moreno, Mariana Vega, Manuel Medrano, Vicente García, Karol G, Nella and Mike Bahía. Spanish singer Rosalía became the first artist to be nominated for the award, in 2017, and also the Grammy Award for Best New Artist in 2020.

The award has been presented to ten male and ten female artists; 3Ball MTY, Calle 13, Jesse & Joy and Monsieur Periné are the only ensembles to earn the award. Since its inception, the award has been presented to musicians or groups originating from Brazil, Colombia, Cuba, Mexico, Puerto Rico, the Dominican Republic, Spain and Venezuela.

== Recipients ==
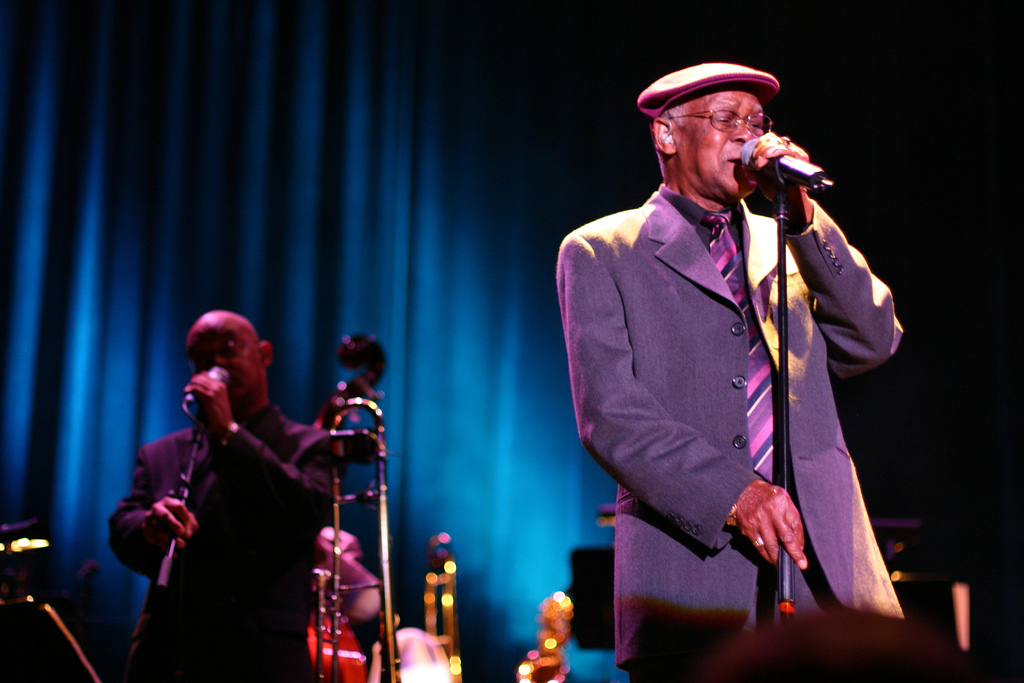
Ibrahim Ferrer, the first award recipient in 2000, performing in The Netherlands in 2004

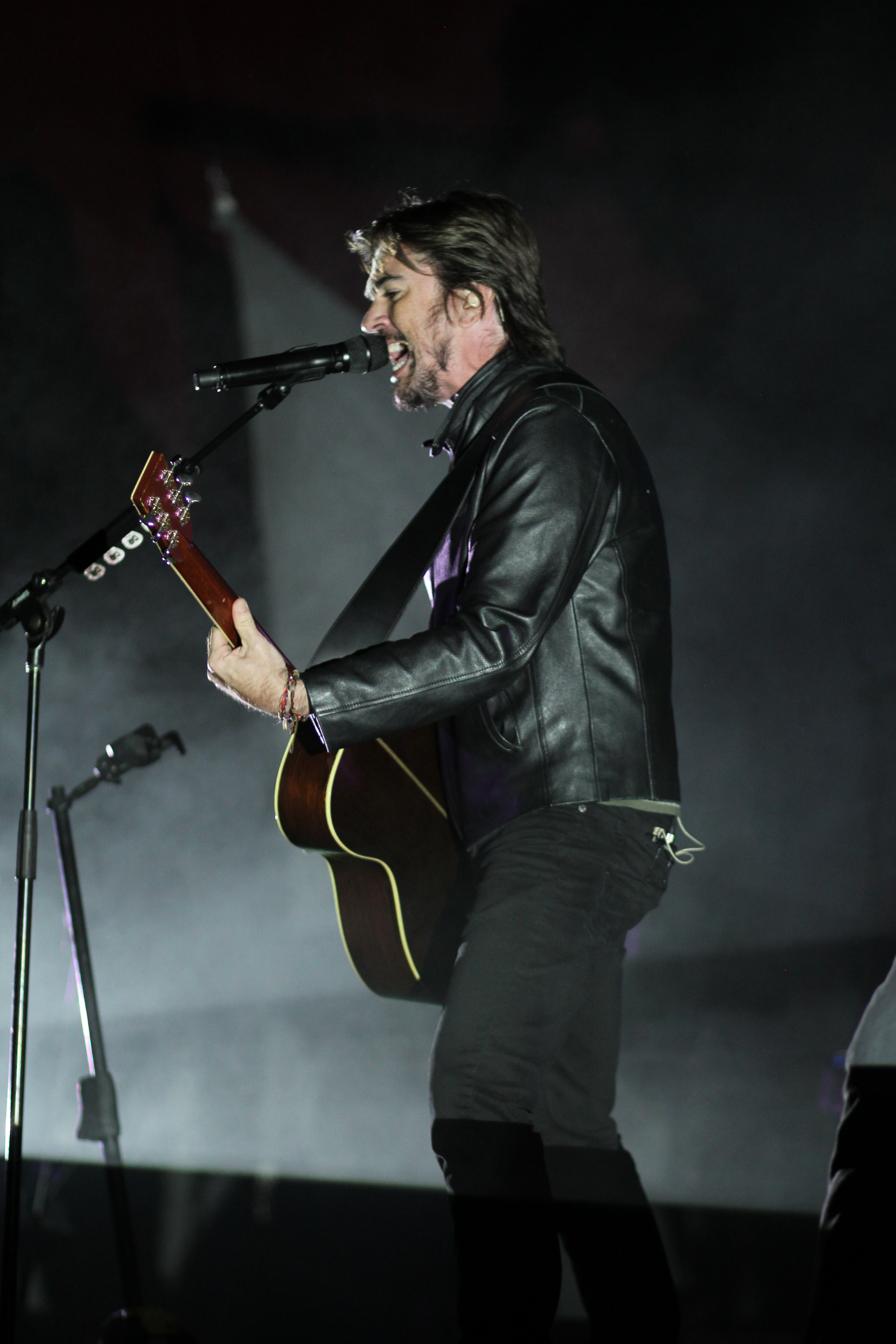
2001 award winner Juanes, performing in 2012

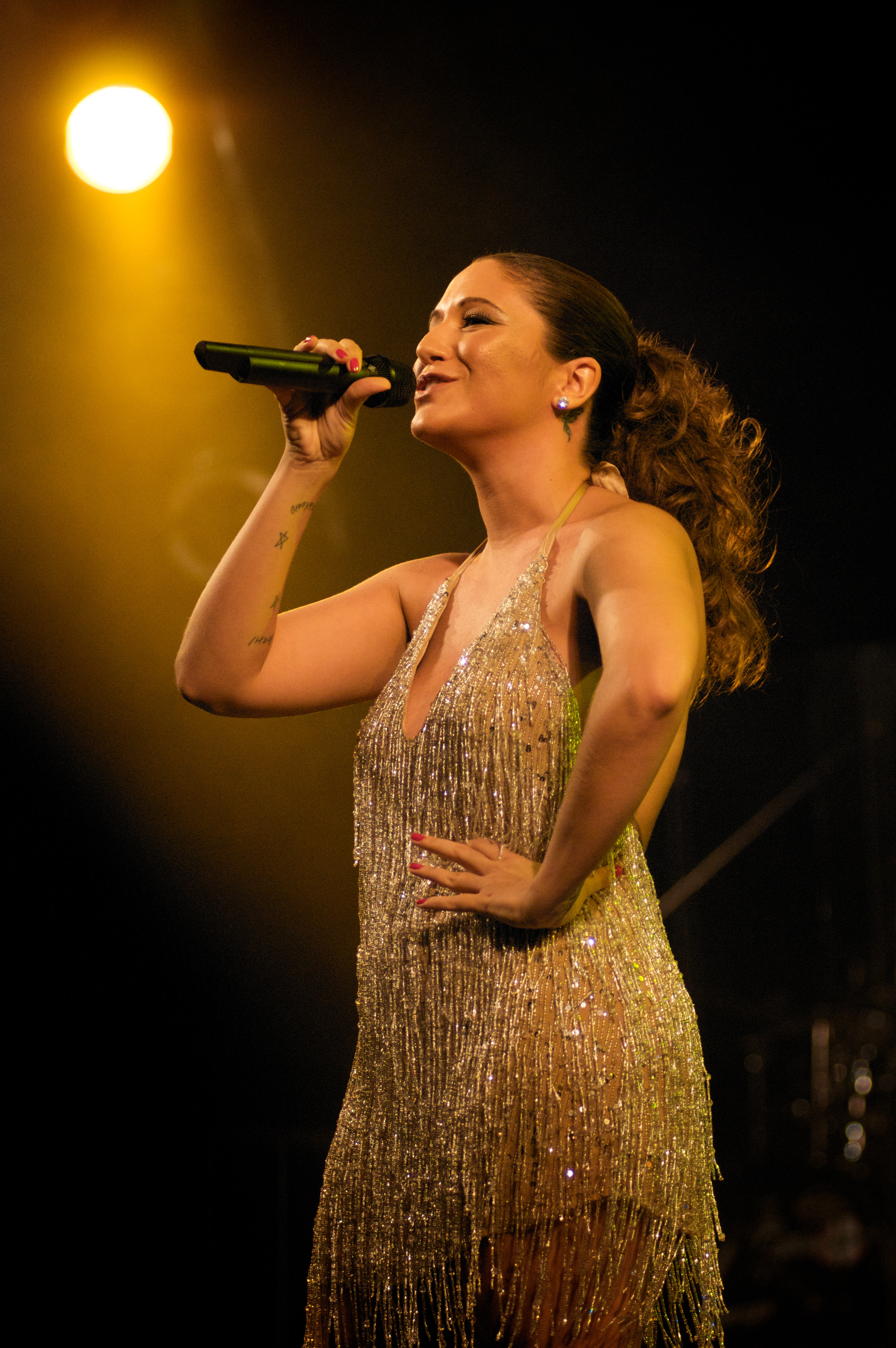
Maria Rita became the first female award recipient in 2004

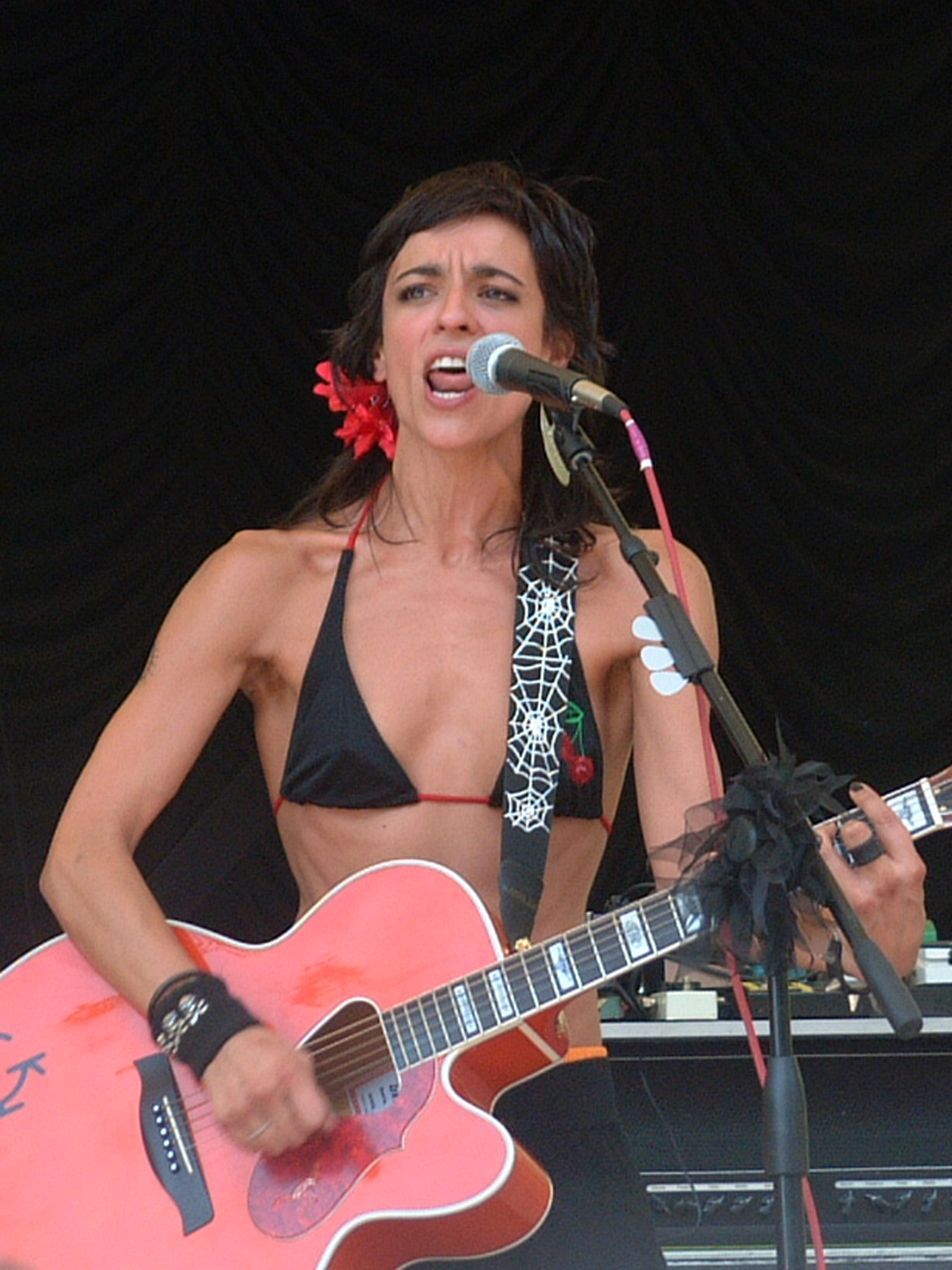
2005 award winner Bebe, performing in 2005

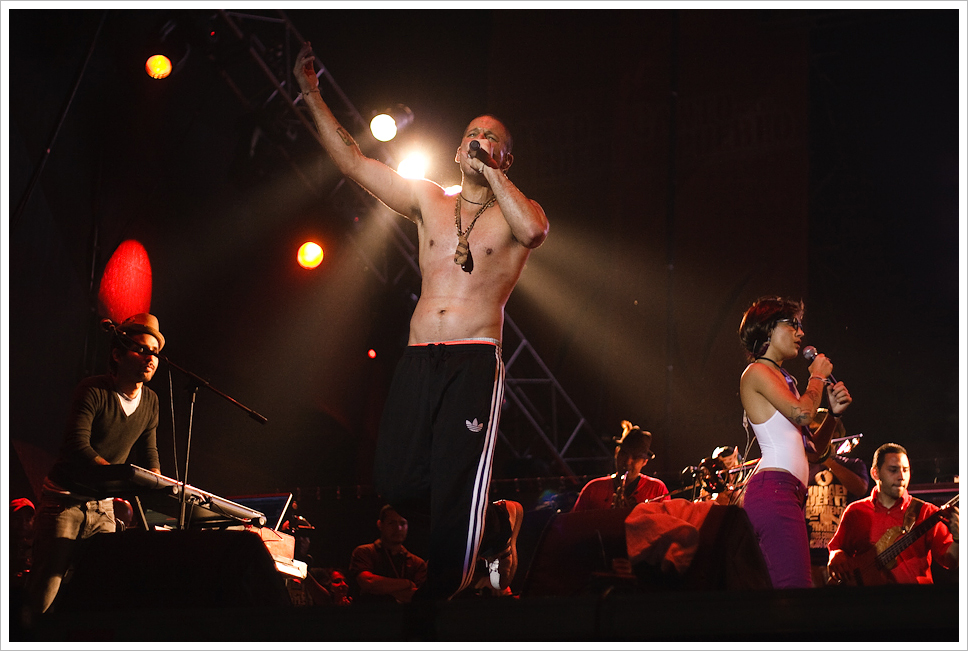
Members of the 2006 award-winning group Calle 13, performing in 2009

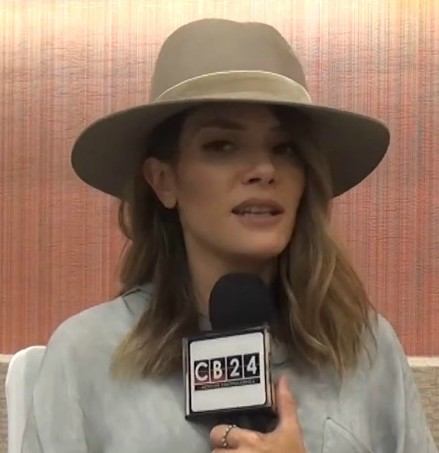
Kany García, awarded in 2008.

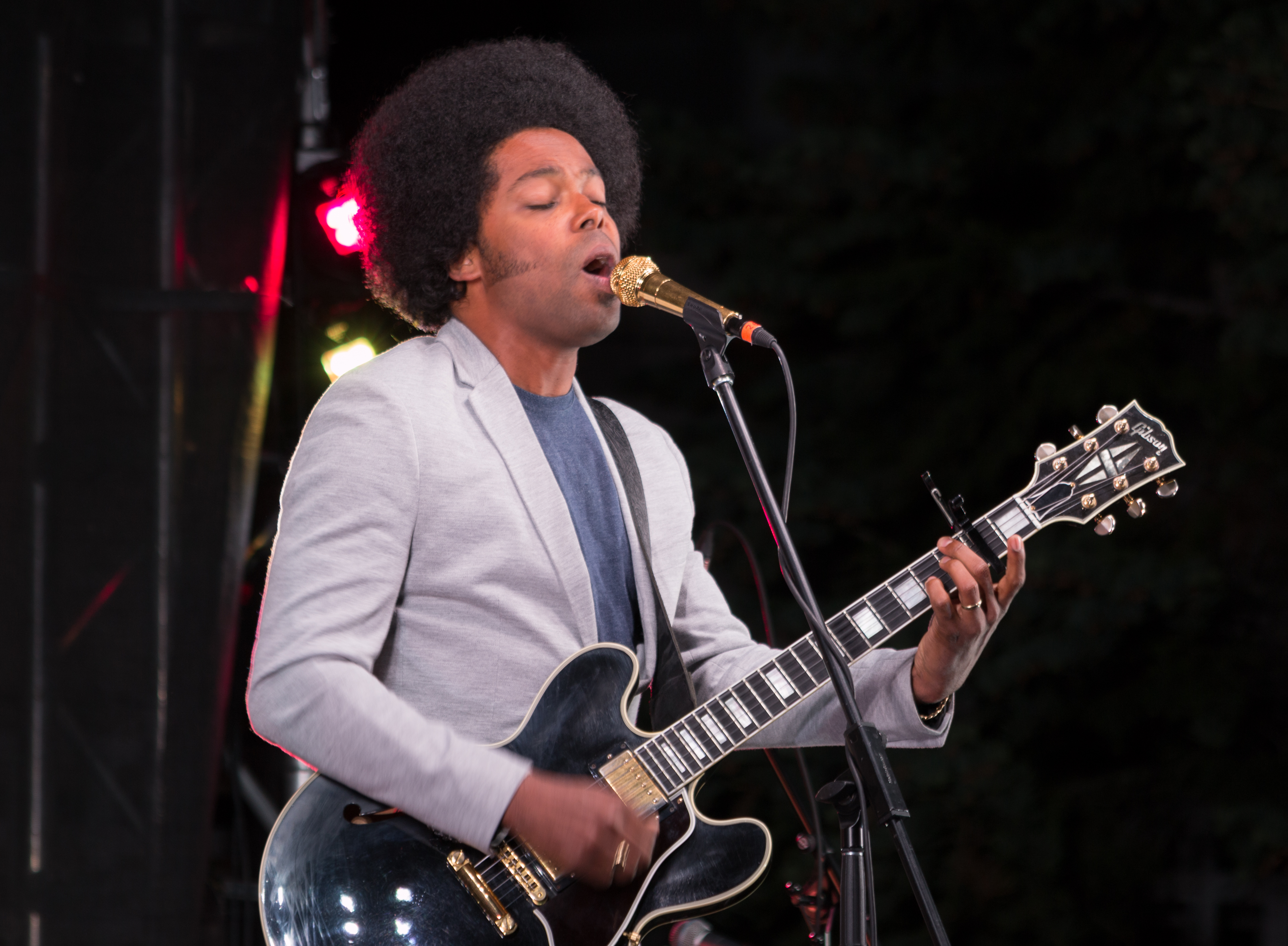
Alex Cuba, awarded in 2010.

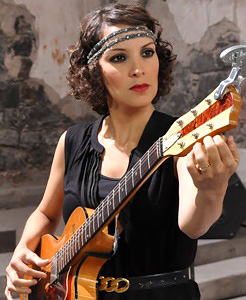
Gaby Moreno, awarded in 2013.

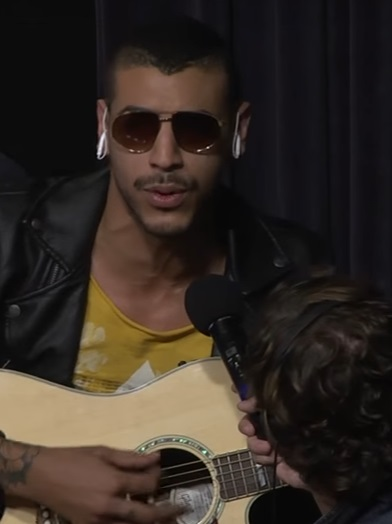
Manuel Medrano, awarded in 2016.

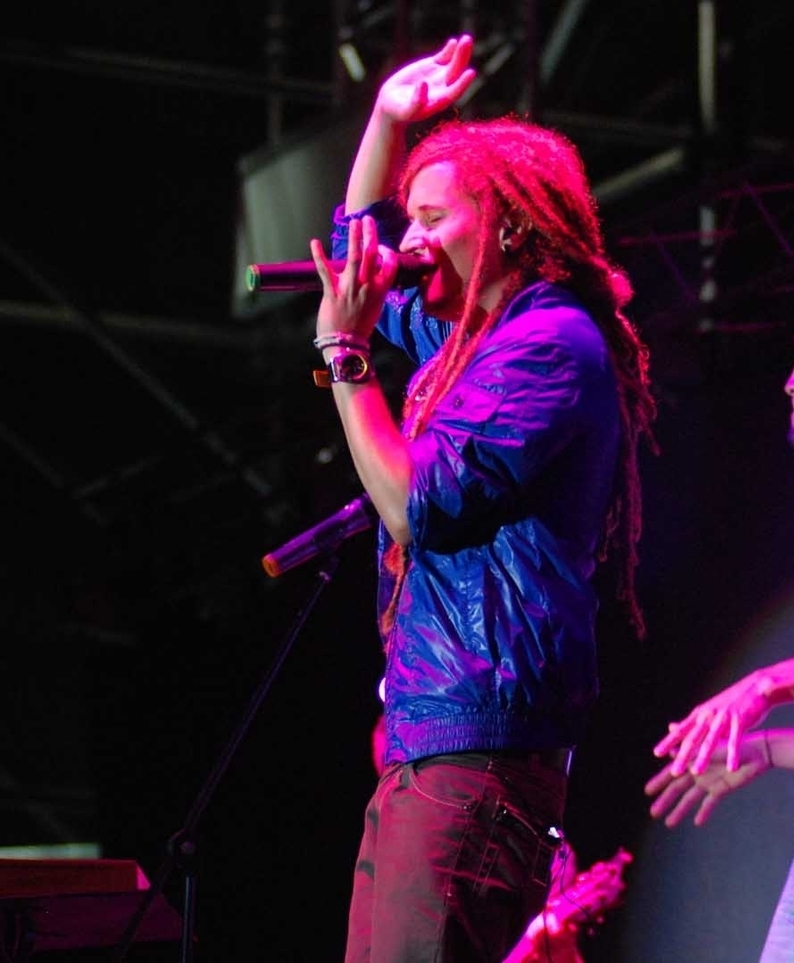
Vicente García, awarded in 2017.

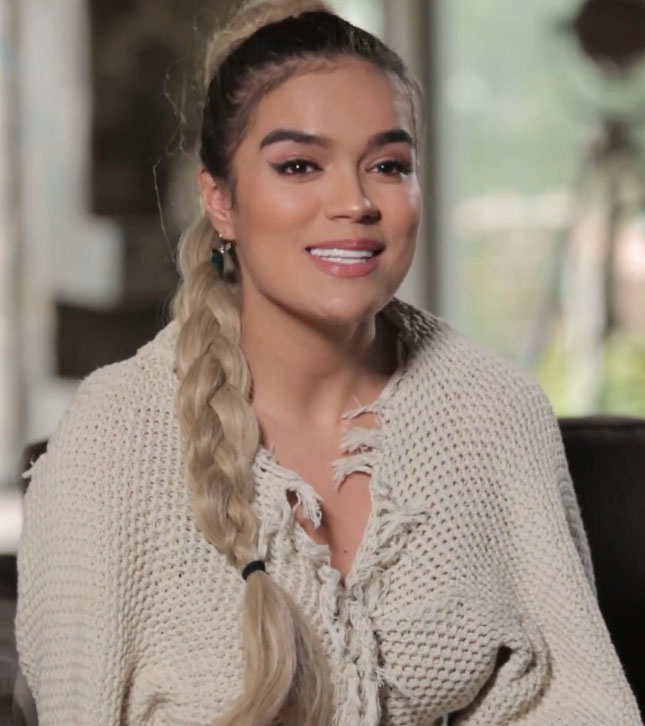
Karol G, awarded in 2018.

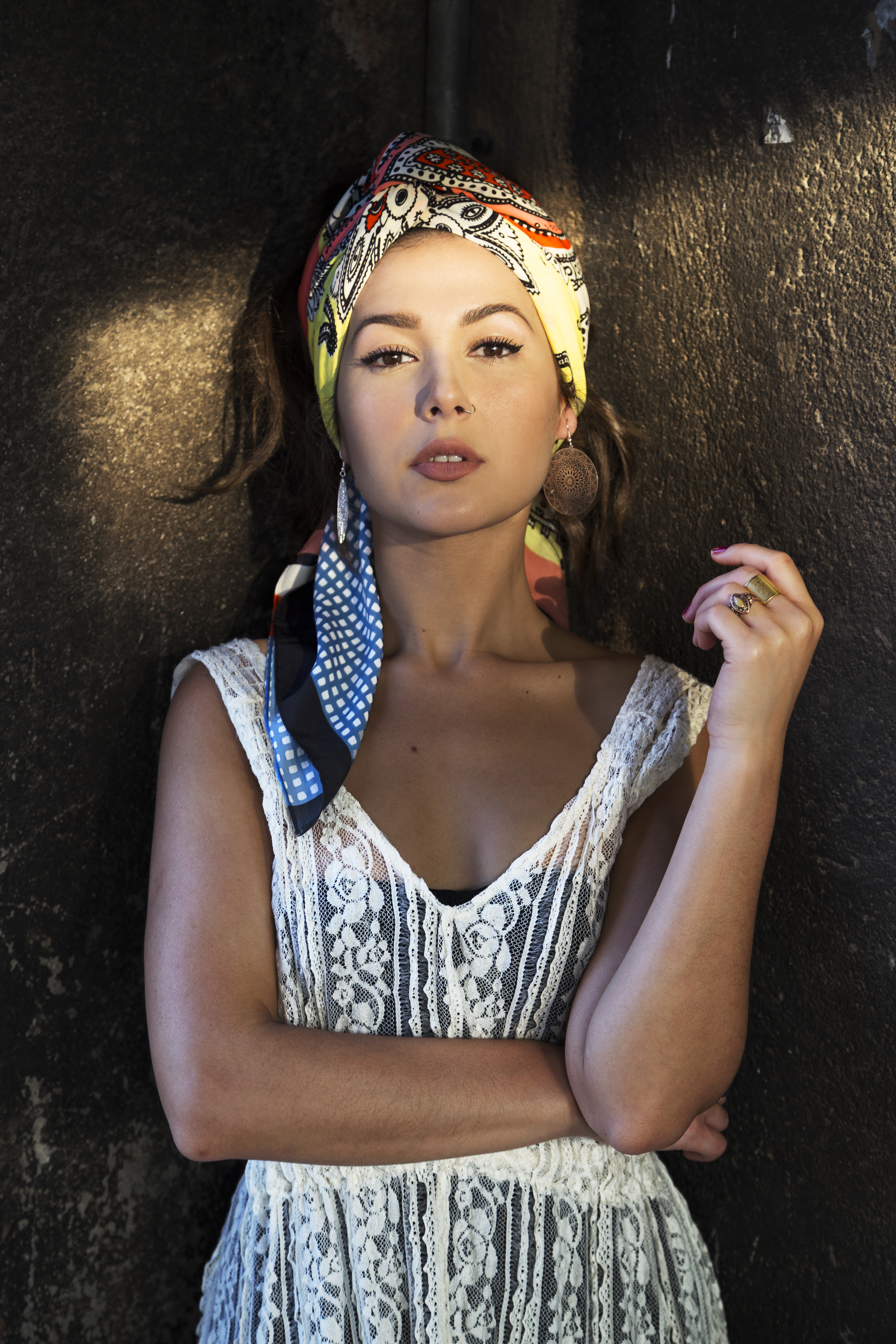
Nella, awarded in 2019.

Year	Recipient(s)	Nationality	Nominees ^{[III]}	Ref.
2000	Ibrahim Ferrer	Cuba	Café Quijano; Amaury Gutiérrez; Fernando Osorio; Ivete Sangalo	
2001	Juanes	Colombia	Bacilos; Bebel Gilberto; Sindicato Argentino del Hip Hop; Manuel Vargas	
2002	Jorge Moreno	Cuba; United States	Cabas; Circo; Gian Marco; Sin Bandera	
2003	David Bisbal	Spain	Tiziano Ferro; Natalia Lafourcade; Fernanda Porto; Álex Ubago	
2004	Maria Rita	Brazil	Akwid; Obie Bermúdez; Mauricio & Palodeagua; Superlitio	
2005	Bebe	Spain	Ilona; JD Natasha; Diana Navarro; Reik	
2006	Calle 13	Puerto Rico	Céu; Inés Gaviria; Lena; Pamela Rodriguez	
2007	Jesse & Joy	Mexico	Alejandra Alberti; Dafnis Prieto; Tulsa; Ricky Vallen	
2008	Kany García	Puerto Rico	Mónica Giraldo; Diogo Nogueira; Roberta Sá; Ximena Sariñana	
2009	Alexander Acha	Mexico	Chocquibtown; Claudio Corsi; India Martínez; Luz Rios	
2010	Alex Cuba	Cuba; Canada	Estrella; Maria Gadú; Jotdog; Koko Stambuk	
2011	Sie7e	Puerto Rico	Pablo Alborán; Max Capote; Paula Fernandes; Il Volo	
2012	3Ball MTY	Mexico	Gaby Amarantos; Ana Victoria; Deborah De Corral; Elain; Ulises Hadjis; Juan Magan; Los Mesoneros; Rosario Ortega; Piso 21	
2013	Gaby Moreno	Guatemala	A Band of Bitches; Leslie Cartaya; EliaCim; Clarice Falcão; Jesús Hidalgo; Maluma; Mojito Lite; Quattro; Miltón Salcedo	
2014	Mariana Vega	Venezuela	Aneeka; Linda Briceño; Caloncho; Julio César; Pablo López; Miranda; Periko & Jessi León; Daniela Spalla; Juan Pablo Vega	
2015	Monsieur Periné	Colombia	Kaay; Iván "Melón" Lewis; Manu Manzo; Matisse; Julieta Rada; Tulipa Ruiz; Raquel Sofía; Vazquez Sounds; Vitrola Sintética	
2016	Manuel Medrano	Colombia	Sophia Abrahão; Álex Anwandter; The Chamanas; Esteman; Joss Favela; ILE; Mon Laferte; Morat; Ian Ramil	
2017	Vicente García	Dominican Republic	Paula Arenas; CNCO; Martina La Peligrosa; Mau y Ricky; Rawayana; Sofía Reyes; Rosalía; Danay Suárez; Sebastián Yatra	
2018	Karol G	Colombia	Ángela Aguilar; Anaadi; El David Aguilar; Alex Ferreira; Los Petitfellas; Nana Mendoza; Christian Nodal; Claudia Prieto; Benjamín Walker	
2019	Nella	Venezuela	Aitana; Burning Caravan; Cami; Fer Casillas; Chipi Chacón; Elsa y Elmar; Greeicy; Juan Ingaramo; Paulo Londra	
2020	Mike Bahía	Colombia	Anuel AA; Rauw Alejandro; Cazzu; Conociendo Rusia; Soy Emilia; Kurt; Nicki Nicole; Nathy Peluso; Pitizion; WOS	
2021	Juliana Velásquez	Colombia	Giulia Be; María Becerra; Bizarrap; Boza; Zoe Gotusso; Humbe; Rita Indiana; Lasso; Paloma Mami; Marco Mares	
2022	Angela Alvarez Silvana Estrada	Cuba Mexico	Sofía Campos; Cande y Paulo; Clarissa; Pol Granch; Nabález; Tiare; Vale; Yahritza y Su Esencia; Nicole Zignago	
2023	Joaquina	Venezuela	Borja; Conexión Divina; Ana del Castillo; Natascha Falcão; Gale; Paola Guanche; Leon Leiden; Maréh; Timø	
2024	Ela Taubert	Colombia	Agris; Kevin Aguilar; Darumas; Nicolle Horbath; Latin Mafia; Cacá Magalhães; Os Garotin; Íñigo Quintero; Sofi Saar	
2025	Paloma Morphy	Mexico	Alleh; Annasofia; Yerai Cortés; Juliane Gamboa; Camila Guevara; Isadora; Alex Luna; Sued Nunes; Ruzzi	
2026	Aria Vega	Colombia	Delilah; Fabian; Loulu Gilberto; Arath Herce; Macario Martínez; Maye; Sofia Monroy; Kendall Peña; Dora Sanches; Zeca Veloso	

^{^[I]} Each year is linked to the article about the Latin Grammy Awards held that year.

== See also ==
- Grammy Award for Best New Artist
- Lo Nuestro Award for New Artist of the Year
