= 26th Annual Latin Grammy Awards =

2025 music awards ceremony

26th Latin Grammy Awards
- Date: November 13, 2025
- Venue: MGM Grand Garden Arena; Paradise, Nevada, United States
- Hosted by: Maluma; Roselyn Sánchez

Highlights
- Most awards: Bad Bunny; Ca7riel & Paco Amoroso (5 each)
- Most nominations: Bad Bunny (12)
- Person of the Year: Raphael

Television/radio coverage
- Network: Broadcast: Univision; Streaming: Vix; HBO Max
- Viewership: 1.806 million (Univision)

The 26th Annual Latin Grammy Awards ceremony was held on November 13, 2025, at the MGM Grand Garden Arena in Las Vegas. The awards honored the best recordings and compositions released between June 1, 2024, and May 31, 2025, as selected by the members of the Latin Recording Academy. Colombian singer Maluma and Puerto Rican actress Roselyn Sánchez served as hosts; for Sánchez, it was her eighth time hosting the ceremony.

Spanish singer Raphael was named the Latin Recording Academy Person of the Year. Lifetime Achievement Awards were presented to Susana Baca, Enrique Bunbury, Ivan Lins, Pandora, and Olga Tañón. Nominations were announced during a virtual livestream on September 17, 2025. Bad Bunny and Ca7riel & Paco Amoroso were the night's top winners, with five awards each. Bad Bunny won Album of the Year for Debí Tirar Más Fotos. Alejandro Sanz won Record of the Year for "Palmeras en el Jardín", extending his record for the most wins in the category with eight. Karol G won Song of the Year for "Si Antes Te Hubiera Conocido", while Paloma Morphy received Best New Artist, continuing the category's five-year winning streak of women. Liniker and producer Édgar Barrera each earned three awards. The ceremony also introduced new categories, including Best Music for Visual Media, awarded to Camilo Sanabria, and Best Roots Song.

== Performances ==
List of musical performances
Artist(s)	Song(s)
Premiere ceremony
Andrés Cepeda	"Bogotá" "Prométeme"
João Gomes; Mestrinho; Jota.pê	"Beija Flor"
Jesse & Joy	"Lo Que Nos Faltó Decir"
Judeline	"Joropo"
Julia Mestre	"Maravilohsamente Bem"
Leiva	"Caída Libre"
Fito Páez	"Sale el Sol"
Vivir Quintana	"Más Libre Que En Casa"
Trueno; Akapellah	"Fresh" "Parriba"
Main ceremony
Carlos Santana; Maluma; Christian Nodal; Edgar Barrera; Grupo Frontera	"Oye Cómo Va" "Corazón Espinado" "Me Retiro"
Aitana	"6 de febrero"
Alejandro Sanz	"El Vino de Tu Boca" "Las Guapas"
Rauw Alejandro	"Khé?" "Silencio" "Falsedad" "Carita Linda"
DannyLux	"Sirena"
Kakalo	"Tierra Trágame"
Ivan Cornejo	"Atención"
Pepe Aguilar	"El Cihualteco" "El Fuereño"
Fuerza Regida; Grupo Frontera	"Malboro Rojo" "Me Jalo"
Carín León; Kacey Musgraves	"Ahí Estabas Tú" "Lost In Translation"
Raphael	"Que Sabe Nadie" "Mi Gran Noche"
Gloria Estefan; Nathy Peluso	"La Vecina (No Sé Na')" "Chirriqui Chirri"
Elena Rose	"Me Lo Merezco"
Karol G Marco Antonio Solís	"Coleccionando Heridas"
Morat	"Faltas Tú"
Ca7riel & Paco Amoroso	"Impostor" "#Tetas" "La Que Puede, Puede" "El Día Del Amigo"
Bad Bunny; Chuwi	"Tikiri" "Weltita"
Joaquina	"Quise Quererte"
Liniker	"Negona dos Olhos Terriveis"
Los Tigres del Norte	"La Lotería"

== Winners and nominees ==
The nominations were announced on September 17, 2025. Bad Bunny led the list with 12 nominations. He is followed by Ca7riel & Paco Amoroso and Édgar Barrera with 10 each; Rafa Arcaute, Natalia Lafourcade, Roberto Rosado and Federico Vindver with eight each; Mag with seven; Liniker and Lewis Picket with six each; Gino Borri and Vicente Jiménez with five each; Antonio Caraballo, Joaquina, Elena Rose and Alejandro Sanz with four, and with three each Andrés Cepeda, Karol G and Carín León. Winners appear first and are highlighted in bold.

=== General Field ===
General Field
**Record of the Year**
- **"Palmeras en el Jardín" – Alejandro Sanz**
  - **Luis Miguel Gómez Castaño & Manuel Lorente Freire, record producers; Frank Lozano, Alfonso Pérez & Felipe Trujillo, recording engineers; Lewis Pickett, mixer; David Kutch, mastering engineer**
- "Baile Inolvidable" – Bad Bunny
  - Jay Anthony Nuñez, Elikai, Julito Gaston, Roberto José Rosado Torres & Mag, record producers; Antonio Caraballo, Luis Amed Irizarry, Armando López & Roberto José Rosado Torres, recording engineers; Josh Gudwin, mixer; Colin Leonard, mastering engineer
- "DTMF" – Bad Bunny
  - Scotty Dittrich, Hydra Hitz, Roberto José Rosado Torres, Julia Lewis, Mag & Tyler Spry, record producers; Antonio Caraballo, Roberto José Rosado Torres & Tyler Spry, recording engineers; Josh Gudwin, mixer; Colin Leonard, mastering engineer
- "El Día del Amigo" – Ca7riel & Paco Amoroso
  - Rafa Arcaute & Federico Vindver, record producers; Rafa Arcaute, Luis Tomás La Madrid & Federico Vindver, recording engineers; Rafa Arcaute, Felipe Bernal, Lewis Pickett & Federico Vindver, mixers; Lewis Pickett, mastering engineer
- "#Tetas" – Ca7riel & Paco Amoroso
  - Rafa Arcaute & Federico Vindver, record producers; Rafa Arcaute, Luis Tomás La Madrid & Federico Vindver, recording engineers; Rafa Arcaute, Felipe Bernal, Lewis Pickett & Federico Vindver, mixers; Lewis Pickett, mastering engineer
- "Desastres Fabulosos" – Jorge Drexler & Conociendo Rusia
  - Nico Cotton, record producer; Nico Cotton & Julio Gómez Núñez, recording engineers; Nico Cotton, mixer; Fred Kevorkian, mastering engineer
- "Lara" – Zoe Gotusso
  - Cachorro López & Diego Mema, record producers; Demián Nava, recording engineer; César Sogbe, mixer; Javier Fracchia, mastering engineer
- "Si Antes Te Hubiera Conocido" – Karol G
  - Edgar Barrera, Karol G & Sky Rompiendo, record producers; Joel Iglesias, recording engineer; Luis Barrera Jr., mixer; Luis Barrera Jr., mastering engineer
- "Cancionera" – Natalia Lafourcade
  - Adán Jodorowsky & Natalia Lafourcade, record producers; Jack Lahana, recording engineer; Jack Lahana, mixer; Bernie Grundman, mastering engineer
- "Ao Teu Lado" – Liniker
  - Júlio Fejuca, Liniker & Gustavo Ruiz Chagas, record producers; Ricardo Camêra, Júlio Fejuca, Daniel Mariano Gonçalves, André Malaquias, João Milliet, Gabriel Pinheiro Machado Milliet, Gustavo Ruiz Chagas, Adonias Souza Júnior & Eric Yoshino, recording engineers; João Milliet, mixer; Felipe Tichauer, mastering engineer
**Album of the Year**
- **Debí Tirar Más Fotos – Bad Bunny**
  - **Roberto José Rosado Torres, Mag & Marcos Masis, album producers; Antonio Caraballo & Roberto José Rosado Torres, album recording engineers; Josh Gudwin, album mixer; Bad Bunny, MAG, Marcos Masis & Roberto José Rosado Torres, songwriters; Colin Leonard, album mastering engineer**
- Cosa Nuestra – Rauw Alejandro
  - Rauw Alejandro, Jorge Pizarro & Nino Karlo Segarra, album producers; Jorge Pizarro, album recording engineer; Josh Gudwin, album mixer; Rauw Alejandro, Christhian Daniel Mojica, Jorge Pizarro & Nino Karlo Segarra, songwriters; Chris Gehringer, album mastering engineer
- Papota – Ca7riel & Paco Amoroso
  - Rafa Arcaute, Ignacio Cruz, Danny Flores, Jean Rodriguez & Federico Vindver, album producers; Rafa Arcaute, Luis Tomás La Madrid, Josh Newell & Federico Vindver, album recording engineers; Rafa Arcaute, Felipe Bernal, Josh Newell, Lewis Pickett & Federico Vindver, album mixers; Rafa Arcaute, Gino Borri, Ca7riel & Paco Amoroso, Vicente Jiménez & Federico Vindver, songwriters; Josh Newell & Lewis Pickett, album mastering engineers
- Raíces – Gloria Estefan
  - Emilio Estefan, Jr., album producer; Carlos Alvarez, Dave Poler & Andres Varona, album recording engineers; Carlos Alvarez, album mixer; Emilio Estefan, Jr., songwriter; Mike Fuller, album mastering engineer
- Puñito de Yocahú – Vicente García
  - Eduardo Cabra & Vicente García, album producers; Eduardo Cabra, Vicente García & Harbey Marín, album recording engineers; Harold Wendell Sanders, album mixer; Vicente García, songwriter; Diego Calviño, album mastering engineer
- Al Romper la Burbuja – Joaquina
  - Joaquina & Julio Reyes Copello, album producers; Santiago Borja, Joaquina, Natalia Ramirez, Robin Reumers, Julio Reyes Copello, Daniel Riaño Restrepo & Natalia Schesinger, album recording engineers; Lee Smith, album mixer; Joaquina, songwriter; Ted Jensen, album mastering engineer
- Cancionera – Natalia Lafourcade
  - Adán Jodorowsky & Natalia Lafourcade, album producers; Jack Lahana, album recording engineer; Jack Lahana, album mixer; Natalia Lafourcade, songwriter; Bernie Grundman, album mastering engineer
- Palabra de To's (Seca) – Carín León
  - Alberto de Jesús Medina Velásquez & Antonio de Jesús Zepeda Rivera, album producers; Alberto de Jesús Medina Velásquez, album recording engineer; Alberto de Jesús Medina Velásquez, album mixer; Carín León, songwriter; Alberto Medina, mastering engineer
- Caju – Liniker
  - Julio Fejuca, Liniker & Gustavo Ruiz Chagas, album producers; Julio Fejuca, Daniel Mariano Gonçalves, André Malaquias, João Milliet, Gustavo Ruiz Chagas & Eric Yoshino, album recording engineers; João Milliet, album mixer; Liniker, songwriter; Felipe Tichauer, album mastering engineer
- En las Nubes - Con Mis Panas – Elena Rose
  - Héctor Mazzarri & Rafael Rodriguez, album producers; Rafferty Santiago, album mixer; Hector Mazzarri, Daniel Rondon & Elena Rose, songwriters; Orlando Ferrer, mastering engineer
- ¿Y Ahora Qué? – Alejandro Sanz
  - Luis Miguel Gómez Castaño, Richi López & Manuel Lorente Freire, album producers; Richi López, Frank Lozano, Alfonso Pérez & Felipe Trujillo, album recording engineers; Lewis Pickett, album mixer; Luis Miguel Gómez Castaño, Richi López, Manuel Lorente Freire & Alejandro Sanz, songwriters; David Kutch, album mastering engineer
**Song of the Year**
- **"Si Antes Te Hubiera Conocido" – Edgar Barrera, Andrés Jael Correa Rios & Karol G, songwriters (Karol G)**
  - "Baile Inolvidable" – Bad Bunny, Antonio Caraballo, Elikai, Julio Gaston, Armando Josue Lopez, Mag, Jay Anthony Nuñez, & Roberto Jose Rosado Torres, songwriters (Bad Bunny)
  - "Bogotá" – Andrés Cepeda, Mauricio Rengifo & Andrés Torres, songwriters (Andrés Cepeda)
  - "Cancionera" – Natalia Lafourcade, songwriter (Natalia Lafourcade)
  - "DTMF" – Bad Bunny, Scott Dittrich, Julia Lewis, Mag, Roberto José Rosado Torres, Hugo René Sención Sanabria & Tyler Spry, songwriters (Bad Bunny)
  - "El Día del Amigo" – Rafa Arcaute, Gino Borri, Ca7riel & Paco Amoroso, Amanda Ibanez, Vicente Jiménez & Federico Vindver, songwriters (Ca7riel & Paco Amoroso)
  - "Otra Noche de Llorar" – Mon Laferte, songwriter (Mon Laferte)
  - "Palmeras en el Jardín" – Luis Miguel Gómez Castaño, Manuel Lorente Freire, Elena Rose & Alejandro Sanz, songwriters (Alejandro Sanz)
  - "#Tetas" – Rafa Arcaute, Gino Borri, Ca7riel & Paco Amoroso, Gale, Vicente Jiménez & Federico Vindver, songwriters (Ca7riel & Paco Amoroso)
  - "Veludo Marrom" – Liniker, songwriter (Liniker)
**Best New Artist**
- **Paloma Morphy**
  - Alleh
  - Annasofia
  - Yerai Cortés
  - Juliane Gamboa
  - Camila Guevara
  - Isadora
  - Alex Luna
  - Sued Nunes
  - Ruzzi

=== Pop ===
**Best Contemporary Pop Album**: **¿Y Ahora Qué? – Alejandro Sanz**; Cuarto Azul – Aitana; Palacio – Elsa y Elmar; Al Romper la Burbuja – Joaquina; En las Nubes - Con Mis Panas – Elena Rose	**Best Traditional Pop Album**: **Bogotá – Andrés Cepeda**; Cursi – Zoe Gotusso; Lo Que Nos Faltó Decir – Jesse & Joy; Natalia Lafourcade Live at Carnegie Hall – Natalia Lafourcade; Después de los 30 – Raquel Sofía
**Best Pop Song**: **"El Día del Amigo" – Rafa Arcaute, Gino Borri, Ca7riel & Paco Amoroso, Amanda Ibanez, Vicente Jiménez & Federico Vindver, songwriters (Ca7riel & Paco Amoroso)**; "Bogotá" – Andrés Cepeda, Mauricio Rengifo & Andrés Torres, songwriters (Andrés Cepeda); "Querida Yo" – Camilo, Gonzalo Ferreyra & Yami Safdie, songwriters (Yami Safdie & Camilo); "Soltera" – Edgar Barrera, Bizarrap, Kevyn Mauricio Cruz Moreno & Shakira, songwriters (Shakira); "Te Quiero" – Juan Ariza, Covi Quintana & Nicole Zignago, songwriters (Nicole Zignago)

=== Electronic Music ===
**Best Latin Electronic Music Performance**
- **"Veneka" – Rawayana featuring Akapellah**
  - "Orión" (Sistek Remix) – Boza, Elena Rose & Sistek
  - "Ella Quiere Techno" – Imanbek & Taichu
  - "QQQQ" – Ela Minus
  - "Rulay En Dubai - (Extended)" – Mr. Pauer, Villa Electronika & DJ Polin

=== Urban ===
Irban Field
**Best Urban/Urban Fusion Performance**: **"DTMF" – Bad Bunny**; "Capaz (Merengueton)" – Alleh & Yorghaki; "De Maravisha" – Tokischa featuring Nathy Peluso; "La Plena (W Sound 05)" – W Sound featuring Beéle & Ovy on the Drums; "Roma" – Jay Wheeler	**Best Reggaeton Performance**: **"Voy a Llevarte Pa' PR" – Bad Bunny"**; "Baja Pa' Acá" – Rauw Alejandro featuring Alexis & Fido; "Dile a Él" – Nicky Jam; "Brillar" – Lenny Tavárez; "Reggaeton Malandro" – Yandel featuring Tego Calderón
**Best Urban Music Album**: **Debí Tirar Más Fotos – Bad Bunny**; Underwater – Fariana; Naiki – Nicki Nicole; MPC (Música Popular Carioca) – Papatinho; Elyte – Yandel	**Best Rap/Hip Hop Song**: **"Fresh" – Trueno, songwriter (Trueno)**; "El Favorito de Mami" – Noah Assad, José Carabaño, Eladio Carrión, Samuel David Jiménez, Adam Moralejo, Albert Packness & Big Soto, songwriters (Big Soto featuring Eladio Carrion); "Parriba" – Akapellah, Jesus Fuenmayor & Trueno, songwriters (Akapellah featuring Trueno); "Sudor y Tinta" – Samuel Wilfredo Dilone Castillo, Sócrates Rafael Francis Puello, J Noa & Vakero, songwriters (J Noa & Vakero); "THC" – Arcángel, songwriter (Arcángel)
**Best Urban Song**: **"DTMF" – Bad Bunny, Scott Dittrich, Julia Lewis, Mag, Roberto Jose Rosado Torres, Hugo Rene Sencion Sanabria & Tyler Spry, songwriters (Bad Bunny)**; "Cosas Pendientes" – Édgar Barrera, Kevyn Mauricio Cruz Moreno, Luis Miguel Gómez Castaño, Manuel Lorente Freire & Maluma, songwriters (Maluma); "En la City" – Trueno & Young Miko, songwriters (Trueno featuring Young Miko); "La Mudanza" – Bad Bunny, Julio Gastón, Luis Amed Irizarry, Marcos Masis, Jay Anthony Nuñez & Roberto Jose Rosado Torres, songwriters (Bad Bunny); "Xq Eres Así" – Alejandro Avila, Álvaro Díaz, Manuel Lara, Nathy Peluso & Joyce Francue Santana Febres, songwriters (Álvaro Diaz featuring Nathy Peluso)

=== Rock ===
Rock Field
**Best Rock Album**: **Novela – Fito Páez**; Legado – A.N.I.M.A.L.; Luna en Obras (En Vivo) – Marilina Bertoldi; A Tres Días de la Tierra – Eruca Sativa; Gigante – Leiva	**Best Rock Song**: **"La Torre" – Nicole Shirel Davidovich, RENEE & Pablo Stipicic, songwriters (RENEE)**; **"Sale el Sol" – Fito Páez, songwriter (Fito Paez)**; "Legado" – Andrés Giménez, songwriter (A.N.I.M.A.L.); "TRNA" – Ali Stone, songwriter (Ali Stone); "Volarte" – Eruca Sativa, songwriters (Eruca Sativa)
**Best Pop/Rock Album**: **Ya Es Mañana – Morat**; Vándalos – Bandalos Chinos; Malhablado – Diamante Eléctrico; Malcriado – Lasso; El Último Día de Nuestras Vidas – Dani Martín; R – RENEE	**Best Pop/Rock Song**: **"Desastres Fabulosos" – Conociendo Rusia, Jorge Drexler & Pablo Drexler, songwriters (Jorge Drexler & Conociendo Rusia)**; "Ángulo Muerto" – Leiva, songwriter (Leiva); "Lucifer" – Renzo Bravo, Lasso & Orlando Vitto, songwriters (Lasso); "No Llames lo Mío Nuestro" – Joaquina & Andry Kiddos, songwriters (Joaquina); "Tu Manera de Amar" – Julián Bernal & Debi Nova, songwriters (Debi Nova); "Un Último Vals" – Leiva, Benjamín Prado & Joaquín Sabina, songwriters (Joaquín Sabina)

=== Alternative ===
Alternative Field
**Best Alternative Music Album**: **Papota – Ca7riel & Paco Amoroso**; Para Quién Trabajas Vol. I – Marilina Bertoldi; Bodhiria – Judeline; Todos los Días Todo el Día – Latin Mafia; Daisy – Rusowsky	**Best Alternative Song**: **"#Tetas" – Rafa Arcaute, Gino Borri, Ca7riel & Paco Amoroso, Gale, Vicente Jiménez "Vibarco" & Federico Vindver, songwriters (CA7RIEL & Paco Amoroso)**; "El Ritmo" – Salvador Colombo, songwriter (Bandalos Chinos); "Joropo" – Javier Fernández Blanco, Pablo Gómez Cano, Roberto Gutierrez Acosta, Andrés De Las Heras, Judeline & Pablo López García, songwriters (Judeline); "Siento Que Merezco Más" – Latin Mafia, songwriters (Latin Mafia); "(Sola)" – Paloma Morphy, songwriter (Paloma Morphy)

=== Singer-Songwriter ===
**Best Singer-Songwriter Album**: **Cancionera – Natalia Lafourcade**; Dos Hemisferios – Alejandro y María Laura; El Cuerpo Después de Todo – Valeria Castro; Cosas Que Sorprenden a la Audiencia – Vivir Quintana; Relatos – Ale Zéguer	**Best Singer-Songwriter Song**: **"Cancionera" – Natalia Lafourcade, songwriter (Natalia Lafourcade)**; "Aeropuerto" – Joaquina, songwriter (Joaquina); "Amarte Sin Que Quieras Irte" – Camilú, songwriter (Camilú); "Como un Pájaro" – Silvana Estrada, songwriter (Silvana Estrada); "Quisqueya" – Vicente García, songwriter (Vicente García)

=== Tropical ===
Tropical Field
**Best Salsa Album**: **Fotografías – Rubén Blades & Roberto Delgado & Orquesta**; Big Swing – José Alberto "El Canario"; Mira Como Vengo – Issac Delgado; Infinito Positivo – Los Hermanos Rosario; Debut y Segunda Tanda, Vol. II – Gilberto Santa Rosa	**Best Cumbia/Vallenato Album**: **El Último Baile – Silvestre Dangond & Juancho De la Espriella**; Son 30 – Checo Acosta; De Amor Nadie Se Muere – Karen Lizarazo; Baila Kolombia – Los Cumbia Stars; La Jerarquía – Peter Manjarrés & Luis José Villa
**Best Merengue/Bachata Album**: **Novato Apostador – Eddy Herrera**; El Más Completo – Alex Bueno; Milly Quezada - Live Vol. 1 Desde el Teatro Nacional de República Dominicana – Milly Quezada	**Best Traditional Tropical Album**: **Raíces – Gloria Estefan**; Malena Burke Canta a Meme Solis, Vol. 1 – Malena Burke & Meme Solis; Caminando Piango Piango – Orquesta Failde
**Best Contemporary Tropical Album**: **Puñito de Yocahú – Vicente García**; Calidosa – Mike Bahía; Ilusión Óptica – Pedrito Martinez; Bingo – Alain Pérez; Fiesta Candelaria – Puerto Candelaria	**Best Tropical Song**: **"Si Antes Te Hubiera Conocido" – Edgar Barrera, Andres Jael Correa Rios & Karol G, songwriters (Karol G)**; "Ahora o Nunca" – Juan José Hernandez, songwriter (Gilberto Santa Rosa); "Cariñito" – Techy Fatule, songwriter (Techy Fatule); "La Foto" – Larry Coll, Luis Enrique & Marcos Sánchez, songwriters (Luis Enrique); "Nunca Me Fui" – Rubén Blades, Andy Clay, Fonseca, Felipe González Abad & Yoel Henríquez, songwriters (Fonseca & Rubén Blades); "Venga Lo Que Venga" – Andy Clay, Fonseca & Alberto Montenegro, songwriters (Fonseca & Rawayana)

=== Regional-Mexican ===
Field
**Best Ranchero/Mariachi Album**: **¿Quién + Como Yo? – Christian Nodal**; Mi Suerte es Ser Mexicano – Pepe Aguilar; Alma de Reyna 30 Aniversario – Mariachi Reyna de Los Ángeles	**Best Banda Album**: **4218 – Julión Álvarez y su Norteño Banda**; 25 Aniversario (Deluxe) – Luis Ángel "El Flaco"; Edición Limitada – Banda MS de Sergio Lizárraga
**Best Tejano Album**: **Bobby Pulido & Friends Una Tuya y Una Mía (Vol.1/En Vivo) – Bobby Pulido**; Imperfecto, Vol. 2 – El Plan; Yo No Te Perdí – Gabriella; Reflexiones – Grupo Cultura; El Siguiente Paso (Live Session) – Marian y Mariel; 6 – Juan Treviño	**Best Norteño Album**: **La Lotería – Los Tigres del Norte**; El Plan & Manuel Alejandro – El Plan & Manuel Alejandro; Pasado, Presente, Futuro – La Energía Norteña; V1V0 – Alfredo Olivas; Frente a Frente – Pesado
**Best Contemporary Mexican Music Album**: **Palabra de To's (Seca) – Carín León**; Mirada – Iván Cornejo; Leyenda – DannyLux; Evolución – Grupo Firme; Incómodo – Tito Double P	**Best Regional Mexican Song**: **"La Lotería" – Luciano Luna, songwriter (Los Tigres del Norte)**; "Hecha Pa' Mí" – Edgar Barrera, Iván Gamez, Alex Hernández & Adelaido Solís, songwriters (Grupo Frontera); "Me Jalo" – Miguel Armenta, Edgar Barrera & Jesús Ortiz Paz, songwriters (Fuerza Regida & Grupo Frontera); "¿Seguimos o No?" – Fernanda Diaz, Daniela García Rosso, Lupita Infante & Mauro Muñoz, songwriters (Lupita Infante); "Si Tú Me Vieras" – Edgar Barrera, Kevyn Mauricio Cruz Moreno, Carín León & Maluma, songwriters (Carín León, Maluma); "Tierra Trágame" – César Gonzales & Kakalo, songwriters (Kakalo & Carín León)

=== Instrumental ===
**Best Instrumental Album**
- **Y el Canto de Todas – Rafael Serrallet & Lviv National Philharmonic**
  - Alma en Cuba – Ariel Brínguez & Iván "Melon" Lewis
  - Saga – Yamandu Costa, Martín Sued e Orquestra Assintomática
  - Ida e Volta – Yamandu Costa
  - Havana Meets Harlem – Harlem Quartet featuring Aldo López Gavilán

=== Jazz ===
**Best Latin Jazz/Jazz Album**
- **Hamilton de Holanda Trio - Live In NYC – Hamilton de Holanda**
- **Cuba and Beyond – Chucho Valdés & Royal Quartet**
  - La Fleur de Cayenne – Paquito D'Rivera & Madrid-New York Connection Band
  - Luces y Sombras – Iván "Melon" Lewis Trio
  - Golden City – Miguel Zenón

=== Christian ===
**Best Christian Album (Spanish Language)**: **Legado – Marcos Witt**; Exaltado – Marco Barrientos; La Novia – Christine D'Clario; Coritos Vol. 1 – Israel & New Breed; Aquí Estamos – Marcos Vidal	**Best Christian Album (Portuguese Language)**: **Memóri4s (Ao Vivo) – Eli Soares**; Ton Carfi 20 Anos (Ao Vivo) – Ton Carfi; Razão Da Esperança – Paloma Possi; Onde Guardamos As Flores? – Resgate; A Maior Honra – Julliany Souza

=== Children's Music ===
**Best Children's Album**
- **Los Nuevos Canticuentos – Canticuentos & Coro de Ríogrande; Gustavo Gordillo, Andrés Leal, Juan Gabriel Turbay & Carlos Vives, producers**
  - Aventuras de Caramelo – Antonio Caramelo & Malibu
  - Cenas Infantis – Palavra Cantada
  - Buscapié – Luis Pescetti & Juan Quintero
  - Jirafas – Rita Rosa

=== Traditional ===
Traditional Field
**Best Folk Album**: **Joropango – Kerreke & Daniela Padrón**; Conjuros – Susana Baca; Lentamente – Sílvia Pérez Cruz & Juan Falú; Candombe – Julieta Rada; #Anónimas&Resilientes – Voces del Bullerengue	**Best Tango Album**: **En Vivo 20 Años – Tanghetto**; Colángelo... Tango – José Colángelo; Piazzolla para Orquesta Típica – Orquesta Típica Daniel Ruggiero; Milonguín – Giovanni Parra Quinteto; Shin-Urayasu – Richard Scofano & Alfredo Minetti; La Inevitable Tentación de Ir a Contramano – Sexteto Fantasma
**Best Flamenco Album**: **Flamencas – Las Migas**; KM.0 – Andrés Barrios; Azabache – Kiki Morente; Sangre Sucia – Ángeles Toledano	**Best Roots Song**: **"Aguacero" – Luis Enrique, Fernando Osorio & Rodner Padilla, songwriters (Luis Enrique & C4 Trío)**; "Como Quisiera Quererte" – El David Aguilar & Natalia Lafourcade, songwriters (Natalia Lafourcade featuring El David Aguilar); "El Palomo y La Negra" – El David Aguilar & Natalia Lafourcade, songwriters (Natalia Lafourcade); "Ella" – Tato Marenco, songwriter (Anita Vergara & Tato Marenco); "Jardín del Paraíso" – Catalina García Barahona, William Martínez, Juan Carlos Mindinero Satizabal & Julio Reyes Copello, songwriters (Monsieur Periné featuring Bejuco); "Lo Que Le Pasó A Hawaii" – Bad Bunny, Luis Amed Irizarry, Mag, Marcos Efrain Masis, Flor Morales Ramos, Jay Anthony Nuñez & Roberto Jose Rosado Torres, songwriters (Bad Bunny)

=== Portuguese Language ===
Portuguese Language Field
**Best Portuguese Language Contemporary Pop Album**: **Caju – Liniker**; No Escuro, Quem É Você? – Carol Biazin; Fugacidade – Janeiro; Maravilhosamente Bem – Julia Mestre; Coisas Naturais – Marina Sena	**Best Portuguese Language Rock or Alternative Album**: **O Mundo Dá Voltas – BaianaSystem**; Colinho – Maria Beraldo; Reações Adversas / Ao Persistirem Os Sintomas – Tó Brandileone; Quanto Mais Eu Como, Mais Fome Eu Sinto! – Djonga; Big Buraco – Jadsa
**Best Portuguese-Language Urban Performance**: **"Caju" – Liniker**; "Só Quero Ver" – BK' & Evinha; "Demoro A Dormir" – Djonga featuring Milton Nascimento; "A Dança (Ao Vivo)" – MC Hariel & Gilberto Gil; "Barbie" – MC Tuto featuring DJ Glenner	**Best Samba/Pagode Album**: **Sorriso Eu Gosto No Pagode Vol. 3 - Homenagem Ao Fundo De Quintal (Gravado Em Londres) – Sorriso Maroto**; Alcione – Alcione; Manual Prático Do Novo Samba Tradicional, Vol. 2: Tia Darci – Marcelo D2; Pagode Da Mart'nália – Mart'nália; Zeca Pagodinho - 40 Anos (Ao Vivo) – Zeca Pagodinho
**Best MPB (Música Popular Brasileira)/MAPB (Música Afro Portuguesa Brasileira) Album**: **Um Mar Pra Cada Um – Luedji Luna**; Sentido – 5 A Seco; Pique – Dora Morelenbaum; Divina Casca – Rachel Reis; Beleza. Mas Agora A Gente Faz O Que Com Isso? – Rubel	**Best Sertaneja Music Album**: **José & Durval – Chitãozinho & Xororó**; Let's Go Rodeo – Ana Castela; Obrigado Deus – Léo Foguete; Transcende (Ao Vivo / Deluxe) – Lauana Prado; Do Velho Testamento – Tierry
**Best Portuguese Language Roots Album**: **Dominguinho – João Gomes, Mestrinho e Jota.pê**; Casa Coração – Joyce Alane; Ao Vivo No Ccb: Homenagem A José Mário Branco – Camané; Universo De Paixão – Natascha Falcão; Transespacial – Fitti	**Best Portuguese Language Song**: **"Veludo Marrom" – Liniker, songwriter (Liniker)**; "Maravilhosamente Bem" – Julia Mestre, songwriter (Julia Mestre); "Ouro De Tolo" – Marina Sena, songwriter (Marina Sena); "Transe" – Zé Ibarra, songwriter (Zé Ibarra); "Um Vento Passou (Para Paul Simon)" – Marcio Borges & Milton Nascimento, songwriters (Milton Nascimento & Esperanza Spalding featuring Paul Simon)

=== Classical ===
Classical and Arrangement Fields
**Best Classical Album**
- **Kaleidoscope - Contemporary Piano Music by Female Composers from Around The World**
  - **Isabel Dobarro; Javier Monteverde, album producer**
- Brouwer, Erena & Others: Guitar Works
  - Ausiàs Parejo; José Luis Ruiz Del Puerto, album producer
- Gabriela Ortiz: Revolución Diamantina
  - Los Angeles Philharmonic; Los Angeles Master Chorale; María Dueñas; Gustavo Dudamel, conductor; Dmitry Lipay, album producer
- Radamés
  - São Paulo Chamber Soloists; São Paulo Chamber Soloists, producer
- Sisters of the Moon
  - Susana Gómez Vázquez; Gonzalo Noqué, album producer
**Best Classical Contemporary Composition**
- **"Revolución Diamantina - Act I: The Sounds Cats Make, Act II: We Don't Love Each Other, Act III: Borders and Bodies, Act IV: Speaking the Unspeakable"**
  - **Gabriela Ortiz, composer (Gustavo Dudamel, Los Angeles Philharmonic & Los Angeles Master Chorale)**
- "Guitar Concerto. I: The Spirit Within, II. Le Tombeau de Viola Liuzzo, III. Devil's Rag"
  - Giovanni Piacentini, composer (Eduardo García Barrios, Eliot Fisk, Orquesta Escuela Carlos Chávez)
- "I Movimiento: La Visita, II Movimiento: Ritual Chamánico, III Movimiento: Introspección, IV Movimiento: Federico Alma Gitana"
  - Marvin Camacho, composer (Marvin Camacho & Orquesta Sinfónica de la Universidad de Costa Rica)

=== Arrangement ===
**Best Arrangement**
- **"Camaleón"**
  - **Cesar Orozco, arranger (Cesar Orozco & Son Ahead)**
- "Sapato Velho"
  - Rafael Beck & Felipe Montanaro, arrangers (Rafael Beck e Felipe Montanaro)
- "Te Deseo Muy Felices Fiestas (Have Yourself a Merry Little Christmas)"
  - Cheche Alara & David Bisbal, arrangers (David Bisbal)
- "Procuro Olvidarte - Versión Sinfónica"
  - Edy Lan, arranger (Brava featuring Yaneth Sandoval)
- "Bach's Cuban Concerto for Piano and Tres"
  - Joachim Horsley, arranger (Joachim Horsley featuring Olivia Soler & Boston Public Quartet and Friends)
- "Flight 962"
  - Cassio Vianna, arranger (Cassio Vianna Jazz Orchestra)

=== Recording Package ===
**Best Recording Package**
- **Cuarto Azul**
  - **Aitana, Christian Molina, Miguel Torán & Isabel Vicente, art directors (Aitana)**
- Cuba and Beyond
  - Ana González, Patricia Nunez, Francisco Pinero, Chucho Valdés & Jourdan Villarroel, art directors (Chucho Valdés & Royal Quartet)
- Gigante
  - Leiva, art director (Leiva)
- Masters of Our Roots
  - Ana González, Patricia Nunez, Francisco Pinero & Jourdan Villarroel, art directors (Albita & Chucho Valdés)
- Por Esas Trenzas
  - Miguel Tomas & Daniela Tomas, art directors (Lourdes Carhuas)

=== Songwriting ===
**Songwriter of the Year**
- **Edgar Barrera**
  - **"Atención" (Iván Cornejo)**
  - **"Contigo al Cielo" (Christian Nodal)**
  - **"Ese Vato No Te Queda" (Carin León featuring Gabito Ballesteros)**
  - **"Hoy No Me Siento Bien" (Alejandro Sanz & Grupo Frontera)**
  - **"Milagros" (Karol G)**
  - **"Si Antes Te Hubiera Conocido" (Karol G)**
  - **"Soltera" (Shakira)**
  - **"Tommy & Pamela" (Peso Pluma & Kenia Os)**
  - **"Una Noche Contigo" (Juanes)**
- João Ferreira
  - "A Gente Pode Sair Dessa" (Vitor Kley)
  - "Água-Viva" (Anavitória)
  - "As Desvantagens De Amar Alguém Que Mora Longe" (Lagum)
  - "Flores Da Rua" (Samuel Rosa) (T)
- Pablo Preciado
  - "Cosas del Destino (El Divorcio)" (Los Tigres del Norte)
  - "Me Gusta Mi Vida" (Intocable)
  - "No Quiero Hablar" (Ángela Aguilar)
  - "Sé Feliz X Mi" (Christian Nodal)
  - "Ya No La Friegues" (Carín León)
- Mónica Vélez
  - "A Dos de Borrarte" (Ángela Aguilar)
  - "Bendito Desamor" (Río Roma)
  - "Para Siempre Triste" (Gloria Trevi & Mónica Naranjo)
  - "Por Si Me Vuelves a Querer" (Camila)
  - "Supernova" (Camila)
- Ale Zéguer
  - "El Amor de Mi Herida" (Carín León)
  - "La Bienvenida" (Yuridia)
  - "Miedo a las Alturas" (Sofi Saar)
  - "Nadie Se Va Como Llegó" (Ángela Aguilar)
  - "Polvo de Gigantes" (Kurt & Edén Muñoz)
  - "¿Quién Lo Hará?" (Carlos Rivera)
  - "Regresa" (Camila)
  - "Te Tardaste" (Río Roma)
  - "Un Minuto de Silencio" (Ángela Aguilar)

=== Production ===
Production, Songwriting and Package Fields
**Producer of the Year**: **Rafa Arcaute & Federico Vindver**; **"El Día del Amigo" (Ca7riel & Paco Amoroso)**; **"Impostor" (Ca7riel & Paco Amoroso)**; **"La Noche de Tu Amor" (ATGGT & Victoria May)**; **"Los Ejes de Mi Carreta (ATGGT & Victoria May)**; **"Re Forro" (Ca7riel & Paco Amoroso)**; **"#Tetas" (Ca7riel & Paco Amoroso)**; **Nico Cotton**; **"Agridulce" (Bhavi & Duki)**; **"Carne Viva" (Blair featuring Dillom)**; **Cuarto Azul (Aitana)**; **"Desastres Fabulosos" (Jorge Drexler & Conociendo Rusia)**; **Latinaje (Cazzu)**; **"Museo del Prado" (Manuel Carrasco)**; **"Perfecto Final" (Conociendo Rusia & Nathy Peluso)**; **"Una Noche Contigo" (Juanes)**; **"Ya Es Mañana" (Morat)**; Edgar Barrera; "Ángel" (Grupo Frontera & Romeo Santos); "El Amigo" (Christian Nodal); Mala Mía (Fuerza Regida & Grupo Frontera); "Me Retiro" (Santana & Grupo Frontera); "Milagros" (Karol G); "Si Antes Te Hubiera Conocido" (Karol G); "Si Tú Me Vieras" (Carín León & Maluma); "Siento (Virgo)" (Bomba Estéreo & Rawayana); "Vino Tinto" (Peso Pluma, Natanael Cano & Gabito Ballesteros); Andrés Torres & Mauricio Rengifo; Bogotá (Andrés Cepeda); "Carita Triste" (Ana Mena & Emilia); "La Colombiana" (Juliana); "La Reina" (Lola Índigo); "Los Años" (La Santa Cecilia); "Me Toca a Mí" (Morat & Camilo); Milagro (Sebastián Yatra); "6 de Febrero" (Aitana); "Una Flor" (Andrés Cepeda & Manuel Medrano); Ya Es Mañana (Morat); Matheus Stiirmer; Enquanto Os Distraídos Amam (Pedro Emílio); Profano (Gabriel Nandes); "Segredo Clichê" (Giana); Veraneio (Veraneio)	**Best Engineered Album**: **Cancionera**; **Jack Lahana, engineer; Jack Lahana, mixer; Bernie Grundman, mastering engineer (Natalia Lafourcade)**; Bodhiria; Isidro Acedo, Rob Bisel, Pablo Gómez Cano & Pablo López García, engineers; Lewis Pickett, mixer; Lewis Pickett, mastering engineer (Judeline); Caju; Júlio Fejuca, Daniel Mariano Gonçalves, André Malaquias, João Milliet, Gustavo Ruiz Chagas, & Eric Yoshino, engineers; João Milliet, mixer; Felipe Tichauer, mastering engineer (Liniker); Enquanto Os Distraídos Amam; Tó Brandileone & Matheus Stiirmer, engineers; Pedro Peixoto, mixer; Fili Filizzola, mastering engineer (Pedro Emílio); Love Cole Porter; Leo Alcantara & Marcelo Saboia, engineers; Marcelo Saboia, mixer; Andre Dias, mastering engineer (Antonio Adolfo)

=== Visual Media ===
**Best Music for Visual Media**
- **Cien Años de Soledad (Banda Sonora de la Serie de Netflix) – Camilo Sanabria**
  - Cada Minuto Cuenta (Banda Sonora de la Serie Original de Prime Video) – Pedro Osuna
  - El Eternauta (Banda Sonora de la Serie de Netflix) – Federico Jusid
  - In the Summers – Eduardo Cabra
  - Pedro Páramo (Banda Sonora de la Serie de Netflix) – Gustavo Santaolalla

=== Music video ===
Music Video Field
**Best Short Form Music Video**: **"#Tetas" – Ca7riel & Paco Amoroso**; **Ferrán Echegaray & Martin Piroyansky, video directors; Armando Bo, Chino Fernández & Francisco Wechsler, video producers**; "El Clúb" – Bad Bunny; Matias Vasquez, video director; Noah Assad, Sigfredo Bellaflores, Juan Vasquez & Esteban Zuluaga, video producers; "Diamantes, Lágrimas e Rostos Para Esquecer (Dlre)" – BK'; Felipe Vellas, video director; Renata Dumont, video producer; "Cura Pa Mi Alma" – Vera GRV; Willy Rodriguez, video director; Ana Del Aguila González, Grayskull, Vera GRV, Enrique Martínez Hernández & Willy Rodríguez, video producers; "Full Time Papi" – Guitarricadelafuente; Albert Moya, video director; Philipp Ramhofer, video producer	**Best Long Form Music Video**: **Papota (Short Film) – Ca7riel & Paco Amoroso**; **Ferrán Echegaray & Martin Piroyansky, video directors; Armando Bo, Chino Fernández & Francisco Wechsler, video producers**; Iradoh - 3 Atos De Irmandade: A Música, O Crime E A Justiça – Hodari; Kaique Alves & Thiago Eva, video directors; Marcelo Campana, Konrad Dantas, Thiago Freire, Bruno Pappa, Eduardo Saraiva, Kako Tufano & Angerson Vieira, video producers; Mon Laferte, Te Amo – Mon Laferte; Camila Grandi & Joanna Reposi Garibaldi, video directors; José Antonio San Miguel García, Diana Rodríguez, Simran Singh & Jaime Villarreal, video producers; Lamento (Extended Cut) – Gaby Moreno; Diego Contreras, video director; Andrew Petersen, video producer; Milton Bituca Nascimento – Various Artists; Flavia Moraes, video director; Ricardo Aidar, Caio Gullane, Fabiano Gullane, Rafael Langoni, Flávia Moraes, Augusto Nascimento, Andre Novis, Victor Pozas & Larissa Prado, video producers

== Background ==
In March 2025, the Latin Recording Academy announced several changes for different categories, including two new ones:

=== Category changes ===
- Two new categories were introduced – Best Music for Visual Media (as a part of the new Visual Media field) and Best Roots Song (belonging to the Traditional Music field).
- The following four categories were renamed: Best Pop Vocal Album into Best Contemporary Pop Album; Best Traditional Pop Vocal Album into Best Traditional Pop Album; Best Urban Fusion/Performance into Best Urban/Urban Fusion Performance; Best Latin Children's Album into Best Children's Album.
- For the category Best Urban Fusion/Performance, the required percentage of urban elements increased from 51% to 60% in order to qualify. Additionally, in the case of remixes, these are eligible only if the original version of the song was released within the same eligibility year.
- For the Songwriter of the Year award, the minimum song threshold was reduced from six to four newly written songs.
- The duration of the eligible videos for Best Long Form Music Video must be at least 12 minutes, with the credits not being counted for the total video's length unless they contribute to the creative process.

== Special merit awards ==
The recipients of the Lifetime Achievement Awards, Trustees Awards, the Latin Recording Academy Person of the Year and the Leading Ladies of Entertainment were announced on August 7, 2025. The Special Merit private ceremony will take place on November 9 in Las Vegas. The honorees will be recognized along with the first Latin Music Educator Award recipient, created with the Latin Grammy Cultural Foundation to honor educators who integrate Latin music into their teaching. As part of the award, the recipient's school music program will receive a US$10,000 instrument donation.

=== Person of the Year ===
- Raphael

=== Lifetime Achievement Awards ===
- Susana Baca
- Enrique Bunbury
- Ivan Lins
- Pandora
- Olga Tañón

=== Trustee Awards ===
- Eric Schilling

=== Leading Ladies of Entertainment ===
- Amarilys Germán
- Paula Kaminsky
- Maricarmen "Tuti" Bou
- Rozalén
