= Latin Grammy Award for Best Urban Performance =

Latin acting award

- Awarded for: quality vocal or instrumental latin urban music singles or tracks
- Country: United States
- Presented by: The Latin Recording Academy
- Currently held by: Milo J featuring Trueno for "Gil" (2026)
- Website: latingrammy.com

The Latin Grammy Award for Best Urban Performance is an honor presented annually by the Latin Academy of Recording Arts & Sciences at the Latin Grammy Awards, a ceremony that recognizes excellence and promotes a wider awareness of cultural diversity and contributions of Latin recording artists in the United States and internationally.

According to the category description guide for the 2013 Latin Grammy Awards, the award is for vocal or instrumental singles or tracks of newly recorded material containing at least 51 percent playing time of Urban music subgenres such as Hip Hop, Rap, Dancehall, R&B, Reggaeton, and could include a fusion mix of other genres. It is awarded to solo artists, duos or groups.

Enrique Iglesias, Rosalía and Bad Bunny are the only artists to win this category twice. Bad Bunny is the most nominated artist with a total of 9 nominations. In 2014, "Bailando" by Enrique Iglesias featuring Descemer Bueno & Gente De Zona became the first song to be nominated for this award and for Record of the Year. In 2018, "Malamente" by Rosalía won this award and was nominated for Record of the Year, also the same with "DTMF" by Bad Bunny in 2025. Other songs nominated for both this award and Record of the Year are "Chantaje" by Shakira featuring Maluma in 2017; "China" by Anuel AA, Daddy Yankee, Karol G, Ozuna, J Balvin in 2020 and "Pa Mis Muchachas" by Christina Aguilera, Nicki Nicole, Becky G featuring Nathy Peluso in 2022.

== Recipients ==
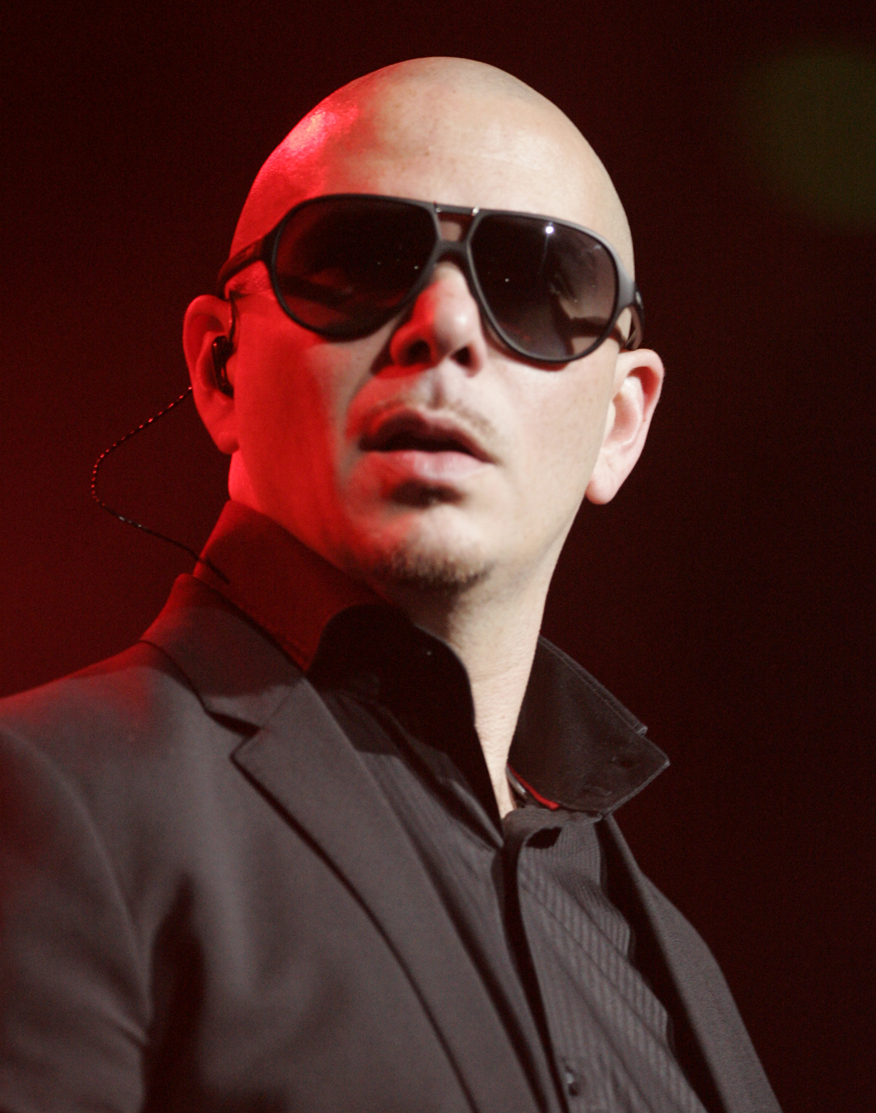
Rapper Pitbull was the first winner of the award.

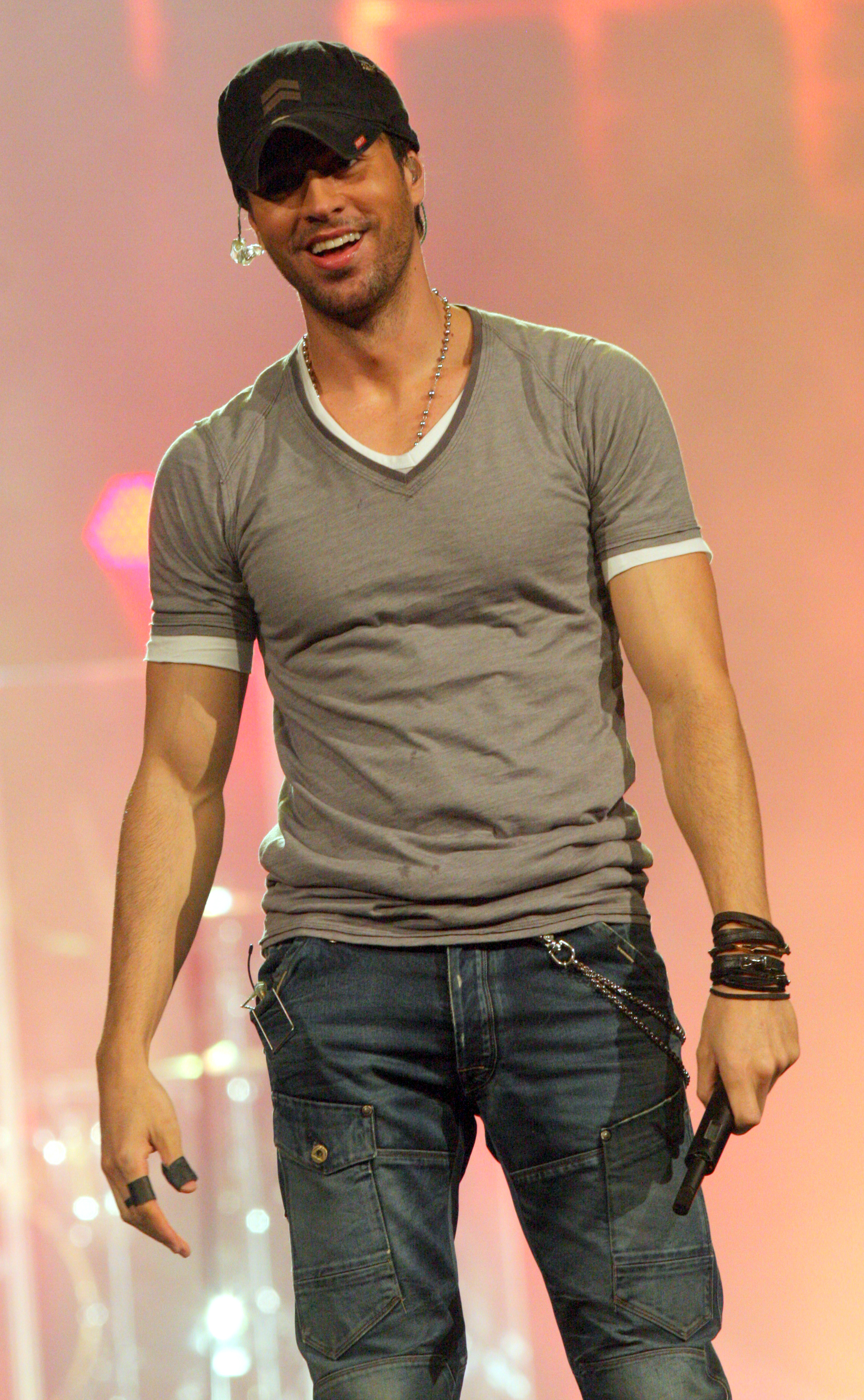
Two-time winner Enrique Iglesias.

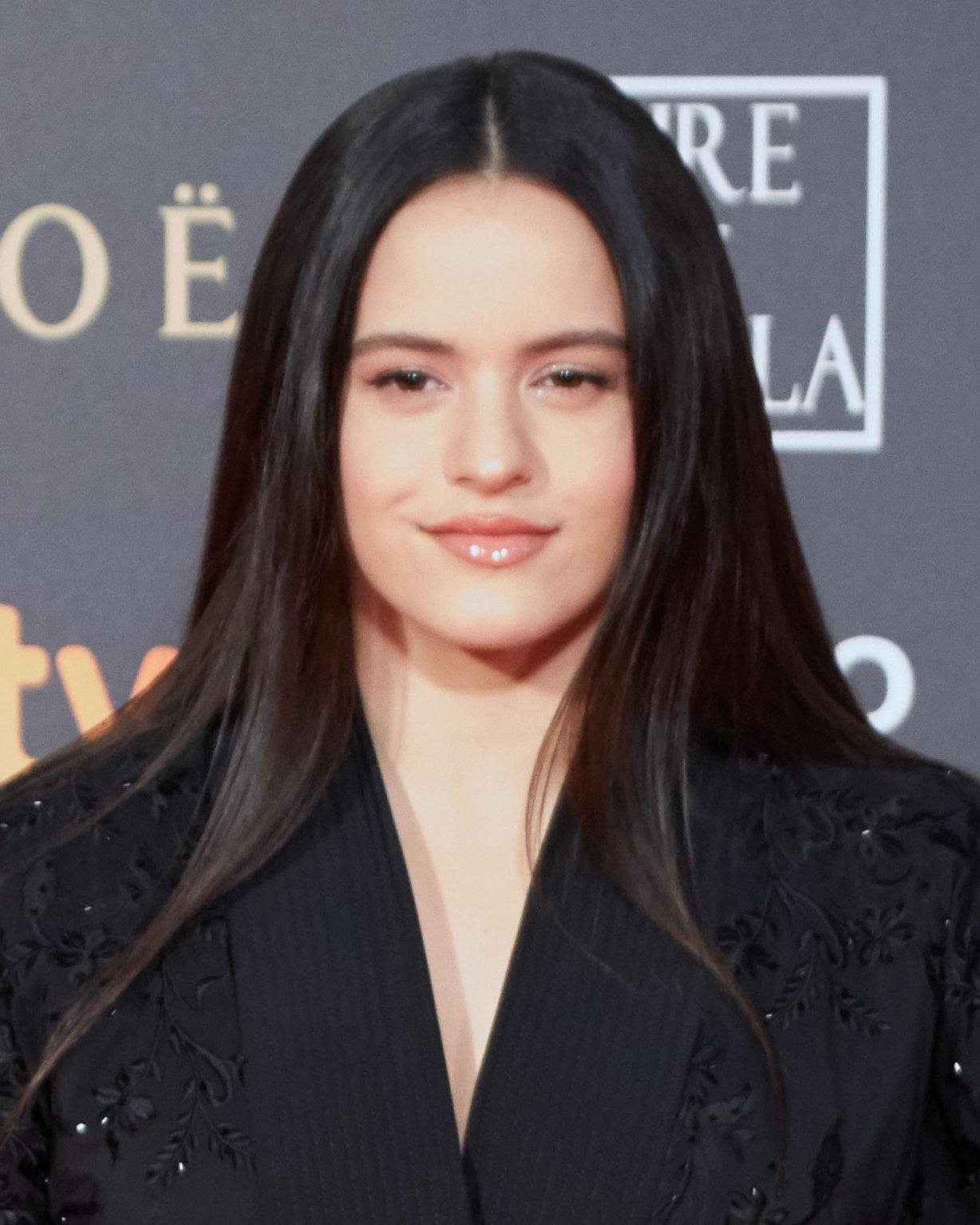
First female recipient and two-time winner Rosalía.

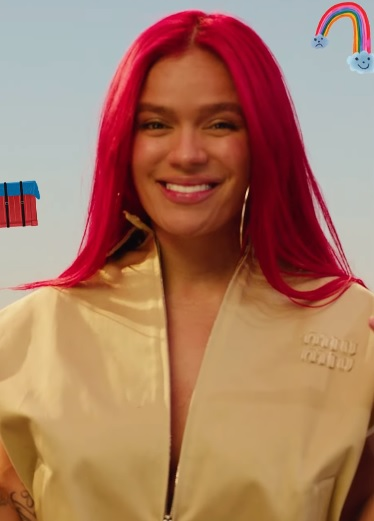
2023 winner, Karol G

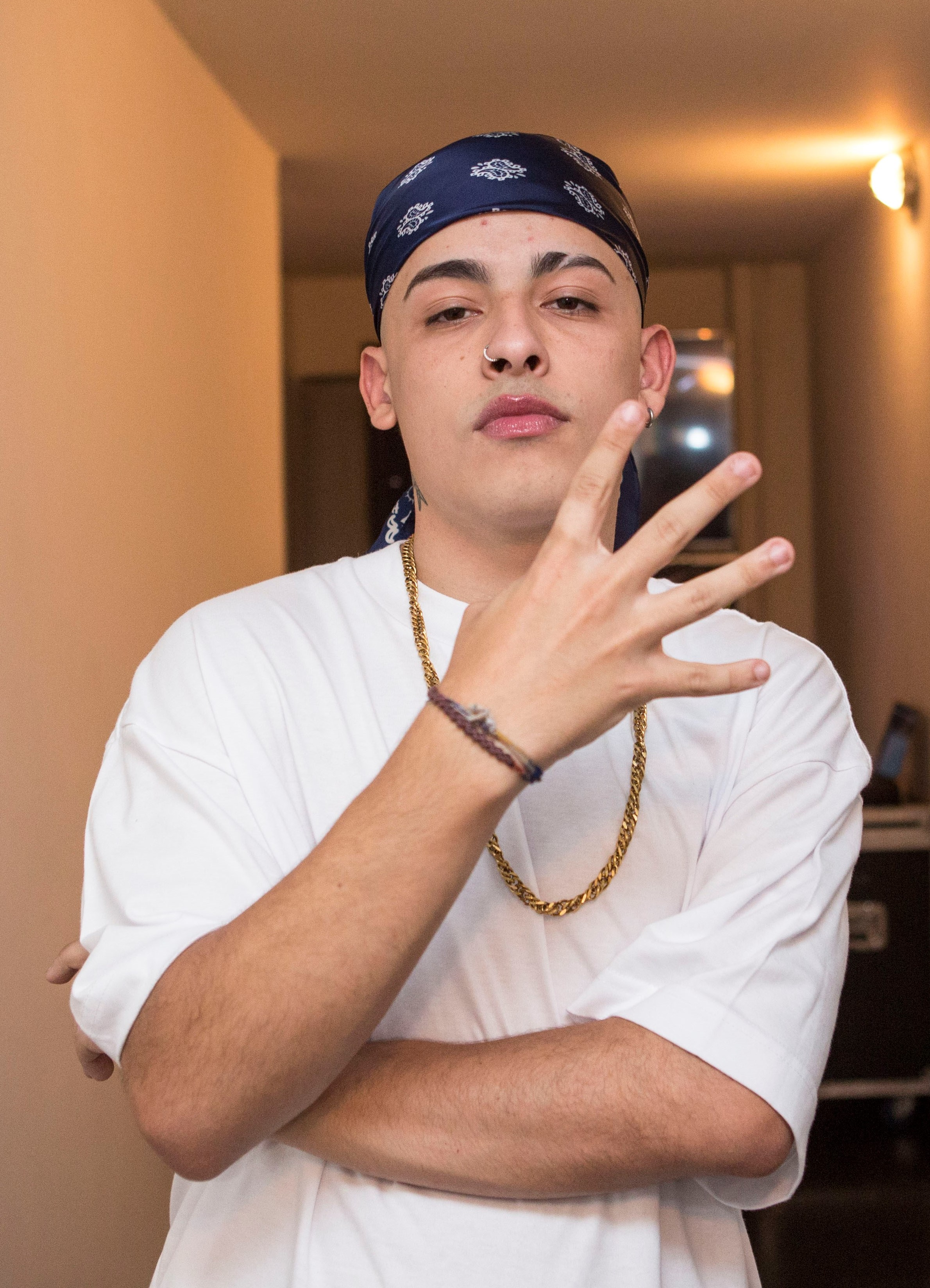
2024 and 2026 winner, Trueno

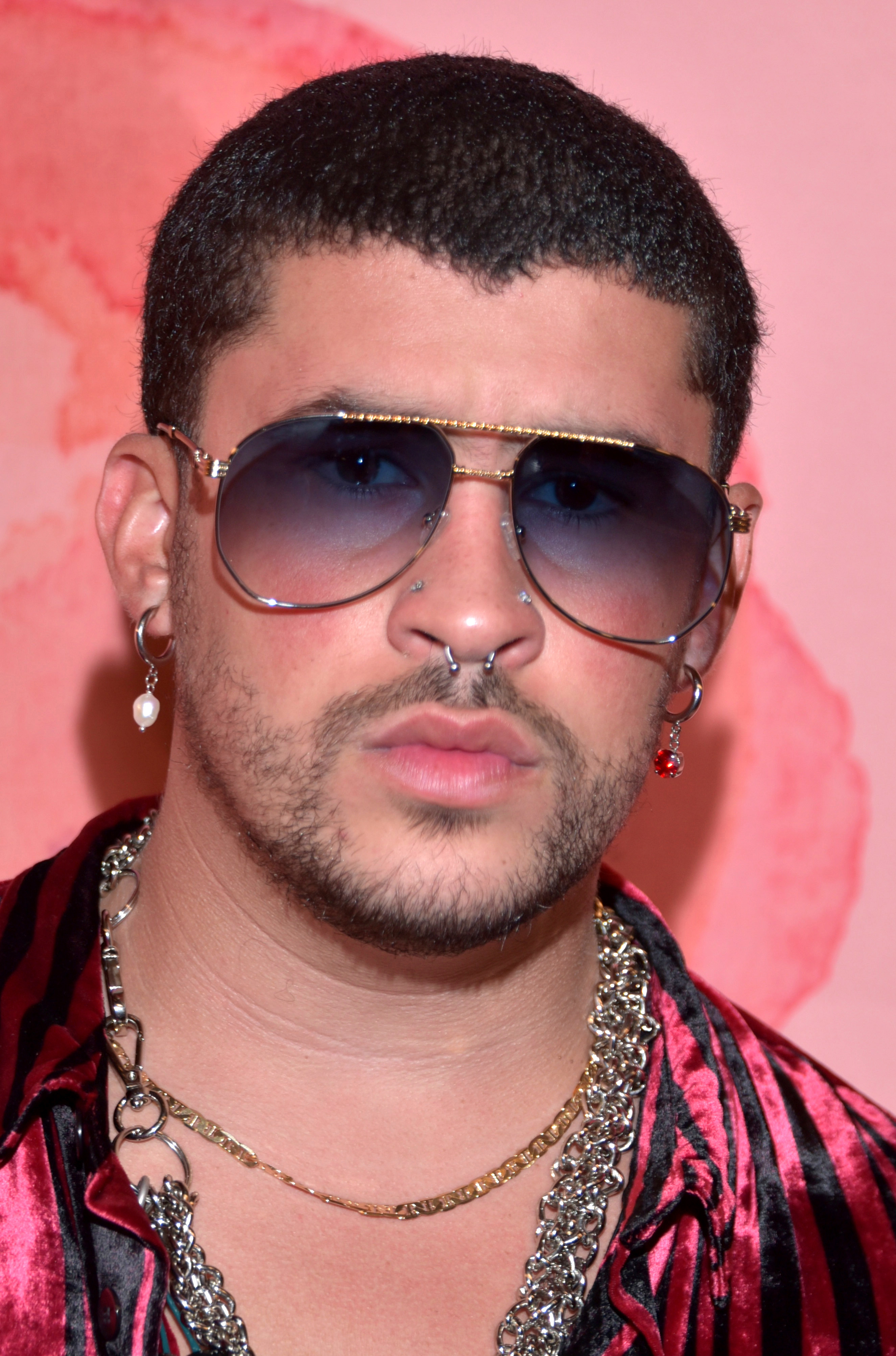
Two-Time Winner Bad Bunny and most nominated artist in this category with nine nominations.

Year	Artist	Work	Nominees	Ref.
2013	Pitbull featuring Papayo	"Echa Pa'lla (Manos Pa'rriba)"	Alexis & Fido – "Rompe la Cintura"; Elvis Crespo featuring Fito Blanko – "Pegaíto Suavecito"; Illya Kuryaki and the Valderramas – "Amor"; Mala Rodríguez – "Quien Manda"	
2014	Enrique Iglesias featuring Descemer Bueno & Gente de Zona	"Bailando"	J Balvin featuring Farruko – "6 AM"; Calle 13 – "Adentro"; Don Omar – "Pura Vida"; Wisin – "Que Viva la Vida"	
2015	Nicky Jam featuring Enrique Iglesias	"El Perdón"	Alexis & Fido – "A Ti Te Encanta"; Alkilados featuring J Alvarez, El Roockie, Nicky Jam – "Una Cita (Remix)"; J Balvin – "Ay Vamos"; Maluma – "El Tiki"; Yandel – "Calentura"; Daddy Yankee – "Sígueme y Te Sigo"	
2016	Yandel	"Encantadora"	Alexis & Fido – "Una En Un Millón"; El Dusty featuring Happy Colors – "Cumbia Anthem"; Jacob Forever – "Hasta Que Se Seque El Malecon"; Tubarao featuring Maneirinho & Anitta – "Pra Todas Elas"	
2017	Luis Fonsi and Daddy Yankee featuring Justin Bieber	"Despacito (Remix)"	J Balvin featuring Bad Bunny – "Si Tu Novio Te Deja Solo"; Nicky Jam – "El Amante"; Residente – "Dagombas En Tamale"; Shakira featuring Maluma – "Chantaje"	
2018	Rosalía	"Malamente"	J Balvin and Willy William featuring Beyoncé – "Mi Gente (Remix)"; Bomba Estéreo – "Internacionales"; Daddy Yankee featuring Orquesta Sinfónica de Puerto Rico – "Yo Contra Ti"; Major Lazer featuring Anitta and Pabllo Vittar – "Sua Cara"	
2019	Pedro Capó and Farruko	"Calma (Remix)"	Bad Bunny – "Tenemos Que Hablar"; ChocQuibtown, Zion & Lennox, Farruko featuring Manuel Turizo – "Pa' Olvidarte"; Daddy Yankee featuring Snow – "Con Calma"; Sech featuring Darell – "Otro Trago"	
2020	Rosalía and Ozuna	"Yo x Ti, Tu x Mi"	Anuel AA, Daddy Yankee, Karol G, Ozuna, J Balvin – "China"; Bad Bunny, Duki and Pablo Chill-E – "Hablamos Mañana"; J Balvin – "Azul"; Ricky Martin, Residente and Bad Bunny – "Cántalo"	
2021	Rauw Alejandro and Camilo	"Tattoo (Remix)"	Alcover, Juan Magán & Don Omar – "El Amor es una Moda"; Bizarrap & Nathy Peluso – "Nathy Peluso: Bzrp Music Sessions, Vol. 36"; Major Lazer featuring Guaynaa – "Diplomatico"; Maluma & The Weeknd – "Hawái (Remix)"	
2022	Bad Bunny	"Tití Me Preguntó"	Christina Aguilera, Nicki Nicole, Becky G featuring Nathy Peluso – "Pa Mis Muchachas"; Christina Aguilera & Ozuna – "Santo"; Bad Bunny & Aventura – "Volví"; Residente featuring Ibeyi – "This is Not America"	
2023	Karol G and Shakira	"TQG"	Arcángel featuring Bad Bunny – "La Jumpa"; Maria Becerra – "Ojalá"; Bizarrap featuring Quevedo – "Quevedo: Bzrp Music Sessions, Vol. 52"; Yandel & Feid – "Yandel 150"	
2024	Trueno	"Tranky Funky"	Bad Bunny – "Nadie Sabe"; María Becerra – "Corazon Vacio"; Bizarrap & Young Miko – "Young Miko: Bzrp Music Sessions, Vol. 58"; Karol G – "S91"	
2025	Bad Bunny	"DTMF"	Alleh & Yorghaki – "Capaz (Merengueton)"; Tokischa featuring Nathy Peluso – "De Maravisha"; W Sound featuring Beéle & Ovy on the Drums – "La Plena (W Sound 05)"; Jay Wheeler – "Roma"	
2026	Milo J featuring Trueno	"Gil"	Bizarrap & Daddy Yankee – "Daddy Yankee: Bzrp Music Sessions, Vol. 0/66"; Ryan Castro, Kapo & Gangsta – "La Villa"; Feid – "Se Lo Juro Mor"; Karol G featuring Eddy Lover – "Dile Luna"	

== Artists with multiple wins ==
2 Wins

- Bad Bunny
- Enrique Iglesias
- Rosalía
- Trueno

== Artists with multiple nominations ==
9 Nominations

- Bad Bunny

6 Nominations

- J Balvin
- Daddy Yankee

4 Nominations

- Bizarrap
- Karol G
- Residente (including 1 with Calle 13)

3 Nominations

- Farruko
- Maluma
- Nicky Jam
- Ozuna
- Yandel
- Nathy Peluso

2 Nominations

- Anitta
- Christina Aguilera
- Feid
- Enrique Iglesias
- Rosalía
- Shakira
- María Becerra
- Trueno
