= Leyenda (album) =

2023 studio album by DannyLux

Studio album by DannyLux
- Released: May 15, 2025
- Length: 63:30
- Language: Spanish
- Label: VPS Music; Warner Music Latina

DannyLux chronology
DLUX (2023)	Leyenda (2025)

Singles from Leyenda
- 1. "Cielo Eterno" Released: August 28, 2024; 2. "Ya No Estás" Released: February 13, 2025

Leyenda (stylized in all caps) is the fourth studio album by singer-songwriter DannyLux. It was released on May 15, 2025, through Warner Music Latina. The album contains 19 tracks with guest appearances from Jasiel Nuñez, Yng Naz, and Juanchito.

The album received a nomination for Best Contemporary Mexican Music Album at the 26th Annual Latin Grammy Awards.

== Background ==
While DannyLux was working on his fourth album, a hard drive containing the only copies of his unreleased music was stolen from his engineer's rental car. The artist stated re-recording the songs "was not gonna be the same", choosing to include only the demos for "No Pasa Nada", "Instinto Natural", and "Carrusel Eterno". The rest of the album was written after his Mexican tour, with DannyLux stating "the songs on this album were the saddest songs I've ever made".

== Release and promotion ==
On August 28, 2024, DannyLux and Jasiel Nuñez released "Cielo Eterno", which would serve as the first single of the album, as a Spotify single. The second single of the album, "Ya No Estás", was released on February 13, 2025. Leyenda was released on May 15, 2025.

A 17-minute short film also titled Leyenda was released simultaneously with the album.

== Reception ==
Leyenda was noted by Billboard as part of the best new Latin music of its week of release.

=== Accolades ===
Publication	Accolade	Work	Rank	Ref.
Billboard	The 25 Best Latin Albums of 2025 So Far (Staff Picks)	Leyenda	6	
Billboard	The 25 Best Latin Songs of 2025: Staff Picks	"Sirena"	6	

== Awards and nominations ==
Award	Year	Category	Result	Ref.
Latin Grammy Awards	2025	Best Contemporary Mexican Music Album	Nominated	

== Track listing ==
Credits adapted from Spotify.

Track listing for Leyenda
No.	Title	Lyrics	Producer(s)	Length
1.	"Tresteza de Lux"	Daniel Balderrama Espinoza; Dariell Cano-Leon; David Moises Segura; Edward Bracamonte	Balderrama Espinoza; Cano-Leon; Segura; Bracamonte	2:48
2.	"Dime BB"	Balderrama Espinoza; Cano-Leon; Segura; Bracamonte	Balderrama Espinoza; Cano-Leon; Segura; Bracamonte	2:40
3.	"Melancolía:("	Cesar Armando Posada Uribe; Balderrama Espinoza; Segura; Bracamonte; Ehren Joseph Fear	Posada Uribe; Balderrama Espinoza; Segura; Bracamonte	3:49
4.	"Sirena"	Balderrama Espinoza; Segura; Bracamonte; Fear	Balderrama Espinoza; Segura; Bracamonte	4:13
5.	"no_pasa_nada_demo.wav"	Balderrama Espinoza; Segura	Balderrama Espinoza; Segura	2:34
6.	"Viaja Conmigo - Remix" (with Jasiel Nuñez and Yng Naz)	Jose Guillermo Martinez Contreras	Posada Uribe; Balderrama Espinoza; Segura; Bracamonte	3:34
7.	"instinto_natural_demo.wav"	Balderrama Espinoza; Erroll Garner	Balderrama Espinoza; Cano-Leon; Segura; Bracamonte	3:40
8.	"2025"	Balderrama Espinoza	Balderrama Espinoza	2:00
9.	"Ten Piedad"	Balderrama Espinoza	Balderrama Espinoza	2:56
10.	"carrusel_eterno_demo.wav"	Balderrama Espinoza; Segura	Balderrama Espinoza; Segura	3:59
11.	"Todo Cambio"	Posada Uribe; Balderrama Espinoza; Segura; Bracamonte; Fear	Posada Uribe; Balderrama Espinoza; Segura; Bracamonte; Fear	3:57
12.	"Mis Loqueras" (featuring Juanchito)	Balderrama Espinoza; Juanchito; L Prince	Balderrama Espinoza; Segura; Juanchito; Prince	3:19
13.	"Cielo Eterno" (with Jasiel Nuñez)	Balderrama Espinoza; Segura; Bracamonte; Jasiel Nuñez	Balderrama Espinoza; Segura; Ernesto Fernandez; Nuñez; Miguel Ruiz Huerta	4:04
14.	"Ya No Llores"	Balderrama Espinoza; Segura; Bracamonte; Fear	Balderrama Espinoza; Segura; Bracamonte; Fear	3:22
15.	"Tinta X Papel"	Balderrama Espinoza; Segura; Bracamonte; Jose Guillermo Martinez Contreras	Balderrama Espinoza; Segura	3:16
16.	"¿En Que Piensas?"	Balderrama Espinoza; Cano-Leon; Segura; Fear	Balderrama Espinoza; Cano-Leon; Segura; Fear	2:45
17.	"Leyenda"	Posada Uribe; Balderrama Espinoza; Segura; Bracamonte; Fear	Posada Uribe; Balderrama Espinoza; Segura; Bracamonte; Fear	2:58
18.	"Ya No Estás"	Balderrama Espinoza; Garner	Balderrama Espinoza; Segura	4:22
19.	"Q.E.P.D"	Couros Sheibani; Dani Blau; Balderrama Espinoza; Nico Baran	Couros; Balderrama Espinoza	2:58
Total length:				63:30

=== Notes ===
- All tracks are stylised in all caps except tracks 5, 7, 10, and 13.

== Release history ==
Release history for Leyenda
Region	Date	Format	Label
Various	May 15, 2025	Digital download; streaming	VPS Music; Warner Music Latina
