= Conexión Divina =

Conexión Divina is a Mexican-American sierreño band. Conexión Divina was nominated for the Best New Artist Award at the 2023 Latin Grammy Awards, becoming the first all-female sirreño group to be nominated.

In April 2023, the trio played Coachella Music Festival.

== History ==
Conexión Divina was originally composed of musicians Liz Trujillo, Ashlee Valenzuela, and Sandra Calixto. Vocalist Liz Trujillo was born in South Central Los Angeles, and got her start singing in her church choir. Ashlee Valenzuela was born in Yuma, Arizona, and was the band's main songwriter in addition to playing the requinto. Guitar player Sandra Calixto was also born in Los Angeles, but raised in Dallas, Texas.

Band members originally met through social media. In September 2022, the trio signed with Sony Music Latin. In an Instagram post in September 2023, the group announced that Ashlee was leaving the band.

In 2023, Austin, Texas-born guitarist Daniela Santiago joined the group. Santiago was a student at the University of Southern California majoring in classical guitar performance when she joined the group.

== LGBTQ representation ==
Conexión Divina's lead singer Liz Trujillo is gay, and the entire group has worked to make the Mexican Regional genre more inclusive for LGBTQ+ fans. Their video for "La Receta" depicts Trujillo in a relationship with another woman.

== Discography ==
- Tres Mundos (2023)
