= Paola Guanche =

Mexican singer and actress (born 2001)

Paola Margarita Guanche Nuviola (born Cancún, Mexico July 21, 2001), better known as Paola Guanche, is a Mexican American singer, composer, musician and actor. She is known for being the first winner of Telemundo's reality competition La voz Kids at age 12 where she was mentored by Prince Royce.

In 2023 Paola Guanche was nominated for the Best New Artist Award at the Latin Grammy Awards. Her musical style incorporates R&B, pop, and electronic influences.

== Personal life ==
Paola Guanche was born in Mexico, and grew up in Miami, Florida. She is a naturalized United States citizen.

Paolo Guanche's parents are the singer Lourdes Nuviola and the pianist Orlando Guancheis. She is the niece of Cuban-born singer and musician Aymee Nuviola.

== Discography ==
- Reencuentro (2023, 5 song EP) Universal Music Latin
