= Latin Grammy Award for Best Roots Song =

Music award category

- Awarded for: quality vocal or instrumental roots music singles or tracks
- Country: United States
- Presented by: The Latin Recording Academy
- Currently held by: Luis Enrique, Fernando Osorio & Rodner Padilla for "Aguacero" (2025)
- Website: latingrammy.com

The Latin Grammy Award for Best Roots Song is an award presented annually by the Latin Academy of Recording Arts & Sciences at the Latin Grammy Awards.

The description of the category at the 2025 Latin Grammy Awards states that it is for "new, unpublished recordings, both vocal and instrumental, that reflect the traditions and roots of various communities, cultures, or social groups, especially those of Hispanic American origin, whether in Spanish, Portuguese or in indigenous languages or dialects". In regards to the genres, these include tango, folk, flamenco, and other traditional subgenres, excluding tropical music and its derivatives. The award is presented to the songwriters of the song and not to the performer unless they also participated in the composition of the song.

The category was introduced at the 26th Annual Latin Grammy Awards in 2025, alongside the category for Best Music for Visual Media.

== Winners and nominees ==
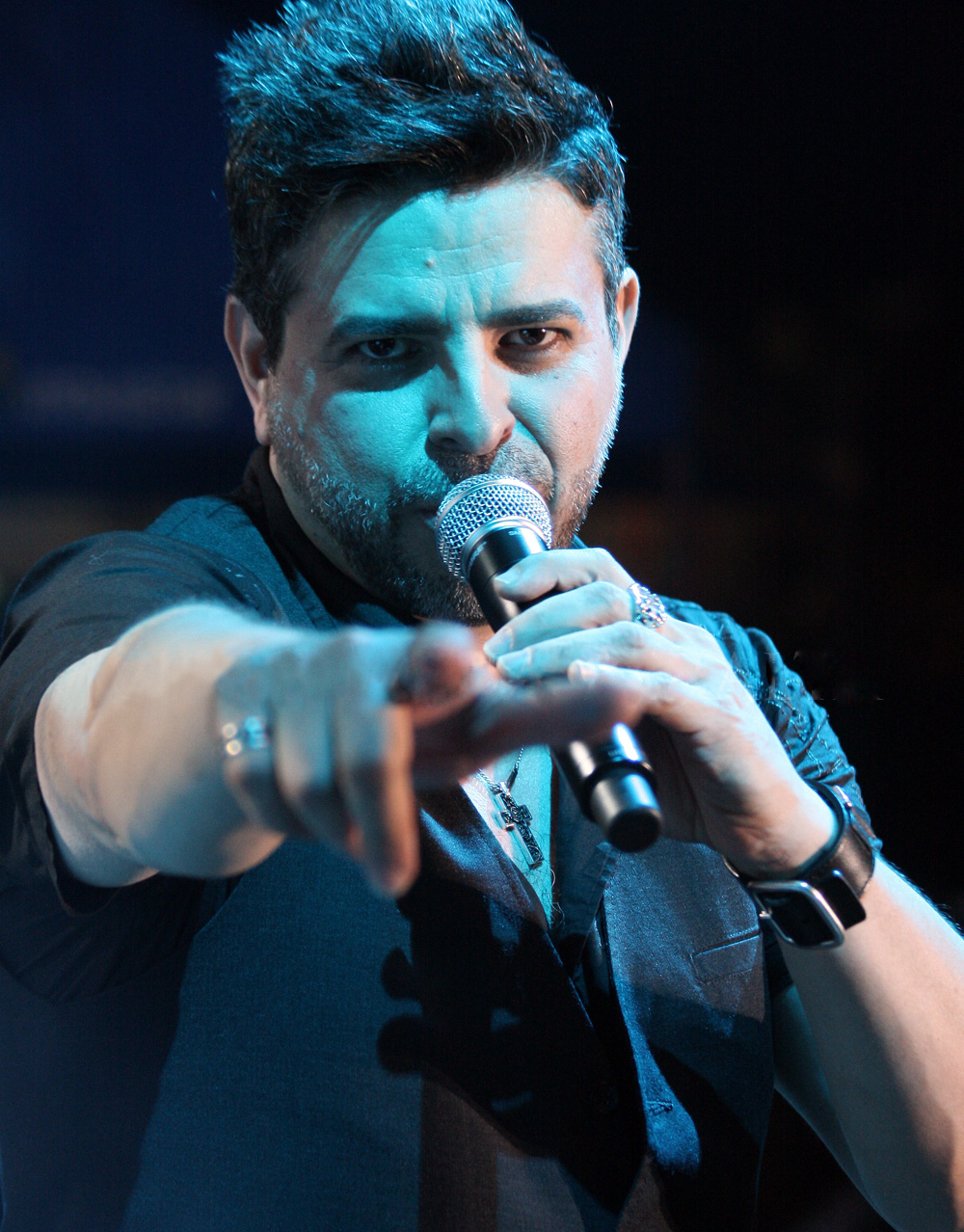
Nicaraguan singer Luis Enrique was one of the inaugural winners in 2025.

Year	Songwriter(s)	Work	Performing artist(s)	Nominees	Ref.
2025	Luis Enrique, Fernando Osorio & Rodner Padilla	"Aguacero"	Luis Enrique & C4 Trío	El David Aguilar & Natalia Lafourcade – "Como Quisiera Quererte" (Natalia Lafourcade featuring El David Aguilar); El David Aguilar & Natalia Lafourcade – "El Palomo y La Negra" (Natalia Lafourcade); Tato Marenco – "Ella" (Anita Vergara & Tato Marenco); Catalina García Barahona, William Martínez, Juan Carlos Mindinero Satizabal & Julio Reyes Copello – "Jardín del Paraíso" (Monsieur Periné featuring Bejuco); Bad Bunny, Luis Amed Irizarry, Mag, Marcos Efrain Masis, Flor Morales Ramos, Jay Anthony Nuñez & Roberto Jose Rosado Torres – "Lo Que Le Pasó A Hawaii" (Bad Bunny)	
