= Latin Grammy Award for Best Music for Visual Media =

Music award category

- Awarded for: quality vocal or instrumental recordings for visual media
- Country: United States
- Presented by: The Latin Recording Academy
- Currently held by: Cien Años de Soledad (Banda Sonora de la Serie de Netflix) – Camilo Sanabria (2025)
- Website: latingrammy.com

The Latin Grammy Award for Best Music for Visual Media is an award presented annually by the Latin Academy of Recording Arts & Sciences at the Latin Grammy Awards.

The description of the category at the 2025 Latin Grammy Awards states that it is for "original music created to accompany and enrich the storyline of movies, television series, video games, and other visual media". In order to be eligible, the project must have been recorded specifically to accompany a visual production and have a duration of at least 15 minutes of the original music. The award is presented to the composer(s) and artist(s) with significant contributions.

The category was introduced at the 26th Annual Latin Grammy Awards in 2025, alongside the category for Best Roots Song.

== Winners and nominees ==
Year^{[I]}	Recipient(s)	Work	Nominees^{[II]}	Ref.
2025	Camilo Sanabria	Cien Años de Soledad (Banda Sonora de la Serie de Netflix)	Pedro Osuna – Cada Minuto Cuenta (Banda Sonora de la Serie Original de Prime Video); Federico Jusid – El Eternauta (Banda Sonora de la Serie de Netflix); Eduardo Cabra – In the Summers; Gustavo Santaolalla – Pedro Páramo (Banda Sonora de la Serie de Netflix)	
