= Joaquina (musician) =

Venezuelan singer-songwriter (born 2004)

- Joaquina at the 2026 Latin Grammy Awards
- Born: Joaquina Valentina Blavia Canabal; 2 July 2004 (age 22); Caracas, Venezuela
- Citizenship: United States; Venezuela
- Occupations: Singer; musician; songwriter
- Awards: Latin Grammy Award for Best New Artist 2023
- Musical career
- Genre: Latin pop
- Instruments: Vocals; piano; guitar
- Label: Universal Latino / Art House

Joaquina Valentina Blavia Canabal (born 2 July 2004), known mononymously as Joaquina, is a Venezuelan-American singer-songwriter and fashion designer, who began her music career as a solo artist. In 2022, she released her debut single, "Rabia", followed by "Freno". Her debut EP Los Mejores Años was released in March 2023.

== Early life ==
Joaquina is the daughter of Camila Canabal and Francisco Blavia. She was born in Venezuela and relocated to Miami at the age of 6. She is a citizen of Venezuela and the United States.

From an early age, Joaquina showed an interest in and a talent for music. She studied piano, singing, and guitar. At age eight, she was writing songs, and by age twelve, she had decided to become a singer-songwriter.

At fifteen, Joaquina recorded her first songs. She began sharing her music on streaming platforms.

At seventeen, she was invited to participate in the academic program at the Art House Academy and the Abbey Road Institute by Maestro Julio Reyes Copello. She also signed her first record deal with Universal Music Latino.

She graduated from the Art House Academy & Abbey Road Institute in Miami in October 2022.

Joaquina won the Latin Grammy for Best New Artist at the 24th Annual Latin Grammy Awards, where she also received a nomination for Best Singer-Songwriter Album, making her the youngest artist to receive this nomination.

In September 2022, Joaquina introduced her debut compositions to the world through her debut EP, Los Mejores Años. She did a collaboration with JCPenney for a back to school clothing line.

== Discography ==
=== EPs ===
- Los Mejores Años (2023)

=== Singles ===
- Aeropuerto (2024)
- Todo y Nada (2024)
- No Llames lo Mío Nuestro (2024)
- El Alquimista (2024)
- Pesimista (2024)
- Escapar de Mí (2024)
- Quise Quererte (2023)
- Blanco y Negro (2023)
- Los Mejores Años (2023)
- Niñas de Instagram (2022)
- Freno (2022)
- Rabia (2022)

== Awards and nominations ==
Name of the award ceremony, year presented, nominee(s) of the award, award category, and the result of the nomination
Award ceremony	Year	Category	Nominee(s)/work(s)	Result	Ref.
Latin Grammy Awards	2023	Best New Artist	Joaquina	Won	
Latin Grammy Awards	2023	Best Singer-Songwriter Album	Los Mejores Años	Nominated	
Pepsi Venezuela Music Awards	2023	Singer-Songwriter Video	"Rabia"	Won	
Pepsi Venezuela Music Awards	2023	Singer-Songwriter Song	"Rabia"	Won	
Pepsi Venezuela Music Awards	2023	Best New Artist	Joaquina	Won	
Premios Juventud	2024	The New Generation – Female	Joaquina	Nominated	
