= Palavra Cantada =

Brazilian musical duo

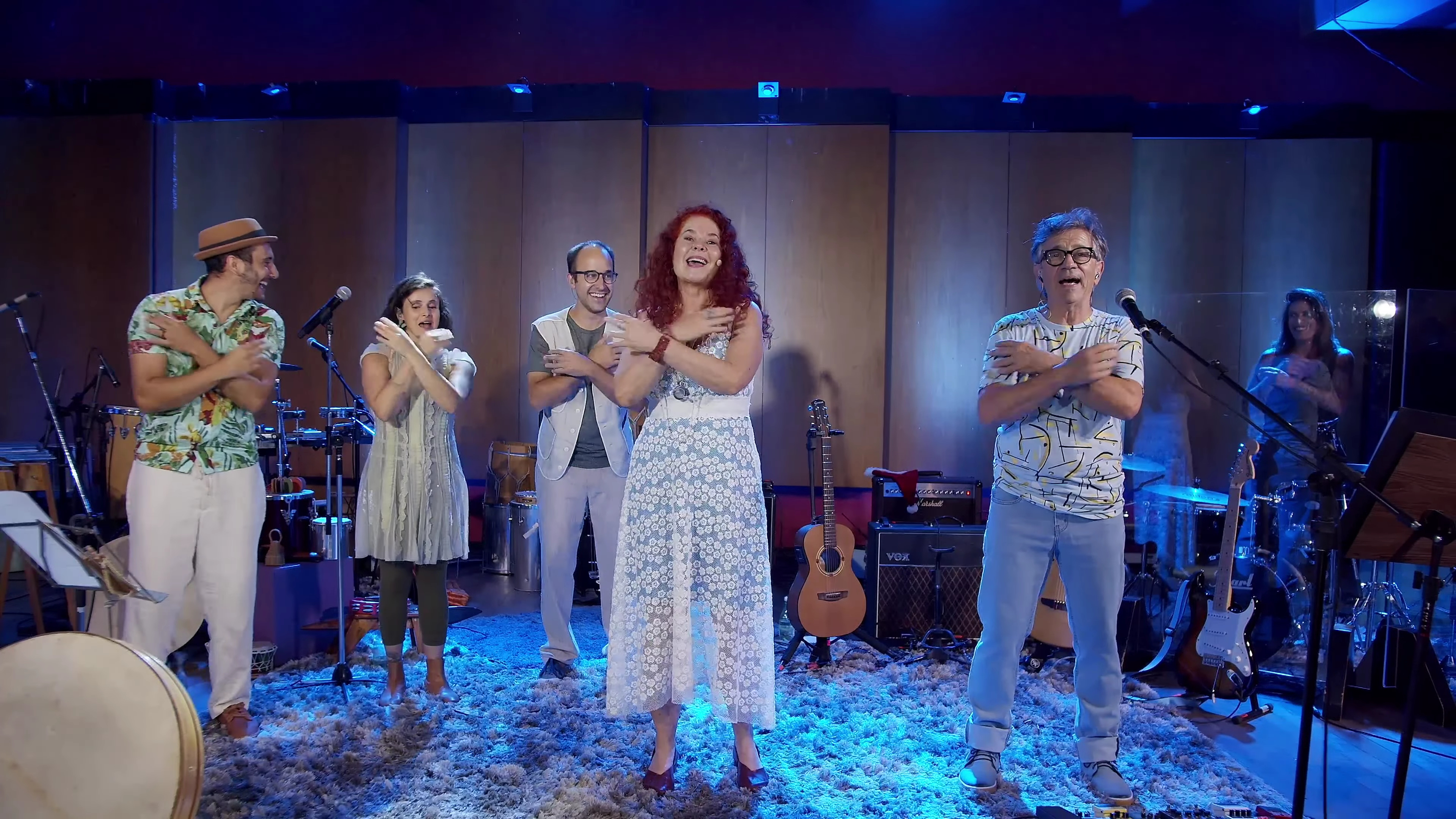

Background information
- Origin: São Paulo, Brazil
- Genres: Children's music; MPB
- Years active: 1994–present
- Members: Paulo Tatit; Sandra Peres
- Website: palavracantada.com.br

Palavra Cantada (lit. 'Sung Word') is a Brazilian musical duo formed in 1994 by Paulo Tatit and Sandra Peres. It is characterized by its children's songs, whose melodies and poetry are inspired by Brazilian popular music. In 2025, they were nominated for a Latin Grammy in the Best Children's Album category for the album Cenas Infantis, released in 2024.

== History ==
The duo Palavra Cantada was formed in 1994 in the city of São Paulo by Paulo Tatit and Sandra Peres. Prior to the formation of the duo, both musicians worked in the production of jingles and soundtracks. The project's first album, "Canções de Ninar: 22 Canções Inéditas para Embalar seu Filho", was released in the same year. The duo's musical production uses melodies and rhythms associated with Brazilian popular music, such as samba and baião, and lyrics aimed at children.

Between 1994 and 2024, the duo released over twenty albums. Some of their songs, such as "Sopa," "Pindorama," and "Criança Não Trabalha" (the latter composed in partnership with Arnaldo Antunes), achieved wide distribution in schools and on streaming platforms. The duo also recorded versions of nursery rhymes and other songs from Brazilian folklore. From the 2010s onward, Palavra Cantada began producing video content for digital platforms, accumulating billions of views on their YouTube channel.

Palavra Cantada received Prêmio da Música Brasileira awards in different editions. In 2025, the duo was nominated for a Latin Grammy Award in the Best Children's Album category for the album Cenas Infantis, released in 2024. Paulo Tatit and Sandra Peres continued to release works and perform live after the date of the nomination.

== Discography ==
- Canções de Ninar (1994)
- Canções de Brincar (1996)
- Cantigas de Roda (1996)
- Canções Curiosas (1998)
- Livro/CD Mil Pássaros (1999)
- Livro/CD Noite Feliz (1999)
- Murucututu (2000)
- Canções do Brasil (2001)
- Meu Neném (2003)
- Palavra Cantada 10 anos (2004)
- Pé com Pé (2005)
- Carnaval Palavra Cantada (2008)
- Palavra Cantada Tocada - Sucessos tocados por Jonas Tatit (2008)
- Canciones Curiosas - Palabra Cantada en Español (2008)
- Coleção "O Livro de Brincadeiras Musicais da Palavra Cantada" (2010)
- UM MINUTiiiiNHO! (2012)
- Baladinha - Sucessos remixados por Lenis Rino (2017)
- Bafafá (2017)
- As aventuras de Pauleco e Sandreca no Planeta Água (2019)
- Cenas Infantis (2024)
