= Paloma Morphy =

Mexican singer-songwriter (born 2000)

Andrea Paloma Barrios Gomez Álvarez Morphy (born Mexico City, 2000), known professionally as Paloma Morphy, is a Mexican songwriter and singer. Morphy won the 2025 Latin Grammy Awards Best New Artist award. Rolling Stone en Español named her an Artist you should know in may 2024 and Billboard named her the November 2025 "Latin Artist on the Rise".

Morphy first became popular for her TikTok song covers in 2022.

== Early life ==
Paloma Morphy worked as a lawyer before she left her legal career to pursue music.

== Musical career ==
Morphy's first album Au was released by Sony Music Mexico in March 2025.
