= Camila Guevara =

- Born: 2000 (age 25–26); Havana, Cuba

Camila Guevara (born Havana, Cuba 2000) is a Cuban singer and songwriter. She was nominated as Best New Artist in the 2025 Latin Grammy Awards.

== Career ==
Camila signed a contract with Sony Music Mexico in 2023.

== Family ==
Camila is the granddaughter of Argentine revolutionary Ché Guevara.

== Discography ==
Title	Details
Dame flores	Released: 2025; Label: Sony Music Mexico
