= Sued Nunes =

- Born: Sapeaçu, Bahia, Brazil
- Occupation: Singer-songwriter
- Award: Nominated for the Best New Artist award at the 2025 Latin Grammys

Sued Nunes (born Sapeaçu, Bahia, Brazil) is a Brazilian singer-songwriter. Nunes was nominated for the Best New Artist award at the 2025 Latin Grammys.

== Early life ==
Nunes learned to play the guitar at age seven. Her first public performances were in bars and small festivals in Sapeaçu and Cachoiera.

Nunes studied history at the Federal University of the Bahian Recôncavo in Cachoeira, Bahia.

== Discography ==
=== Singles ===
Nunes' 2024 single "Eixo" is a homage to the Yoruba deity Eshu.

=== Albums ===
Year	Album	Label
2021	Travessia	Alá Comunicação e Cultura
2024	Segunda-Feira	Alá Comunicação e Cultura
