= Juliane Gamboa =

Juliane Merenciano Gamboa, better known as Juliane Gamboa (born Petrópolis, Brazil) is a Brazilian singer and songwriter who focuses on samba, jazz, and música popular brasileira (MPB). Gamboa was nominated as the Best New Artist at the 2025 Latin Grammy Awards.

Gamboa names Michael Jackson, Elis Regina, hip-hop, and Djavan as among her musical influences.

Gamboa served as an artist in residency at Rio de Janeiro's MARES – Women Artists in Residency, collaborating on an album with residency participants.

== Early life ==
Gamboa was raised in Morro da Cocada where she sang in her catholic church choir. Her father is a percussionist.

Gamboa graduated with a degree in Art History from the Federal University of Rio de Janeiro. She combines her musical career with work as an activist and curator.

== Discography ==
=== Singles ===
Year	Title	Collaborators
2020	"Vambora"	Banda Boom
2020	"No Espelho"	Ananda Jacques
2021	"Mulher Força"	Josiel Konrad
2023	"Sete Mulheres pela Independência do Brasil"	Zélia Duncan and Ana Costa

=== Albums ===
Year	Title	Recording Studio
2024	JAZZWOMAN	Biscoito Fino
