= Sapeaçu =

Coordinates: 12°44′S 39°13′W

- Municipality
- Flag Coat of arms
- Interactive map of Sapeaçu
- Country: Brazil
- Region: Nordeste
- State: Bahia

Population (2020)
  - Total: 17,409
- Time zone: UTC−3 (BRT)

Sapeaçu is a municipality in the state of Bahia in the North-East region of Brazil.

== See also ==
- List of municipalities in Bahia
