= Alleh (Venezuelan musician) =

Venezuelan singer and songwriter

- Born: Alleh Mezher; 13 December 2003 (age 22); Valencia, Venezuela
- Genres: Reggaeton; Afrobeat
- Occupations: Singer; songwriter
- Years active: 2022–present

Alleh Mezher (born Valencia, Venezuela), better known as Alleh, is a Venezuelan singer and songwriter best known for his electronic approach to traditional Latin American dance music and tecnomerengue. Alleh was nominated for the 2025 Latin Grammy's Best New Artist Award.

== Early Years ==
Mezher was born in Valencia. From a young age, he showed an interest in music and began developing his artistic career in the 2020. His first compositions and releases emerged independently on digital platforms, where he began to gain attention within the Latin urban pop scene. During his early years as an artist, Alleh experimented with various urban music styles, including Latin pop, reggaeton, and electronic music. His first released song was “Baby Guaya,” which marked the beginning of his professional career. In 2024, he released the single “Deja Vu,” his first collaboration with Venezuelan producer and singer Yorghaki, with whom he would later form an artistic duo.

Alleh worked with fellow Venezuelan producer Yorghak on the 2024 track "capaz (merenguetón)" which went platinum in Spain. Working together as Alleh y Yorghak, they released the 12-track album 2025 La Ciudad.

In 2025, Alleh & Yorghaki were nominated for the 2025 Premios Juventud.

== Discography ==
=== Albums ===
- La Ciudad (2024, with Alleh & Yorghaki)

=== Singles ===
- Capaz (merenguetón)
- “Deja Vu”
- “Una Noche”
- “El Ingeniero”
- “Ultravioleta”
- "Baby Guaya"
- "DesOrden"
- "amoureux"
