= Manuel Medrano =

Colombian musician (born 1987)

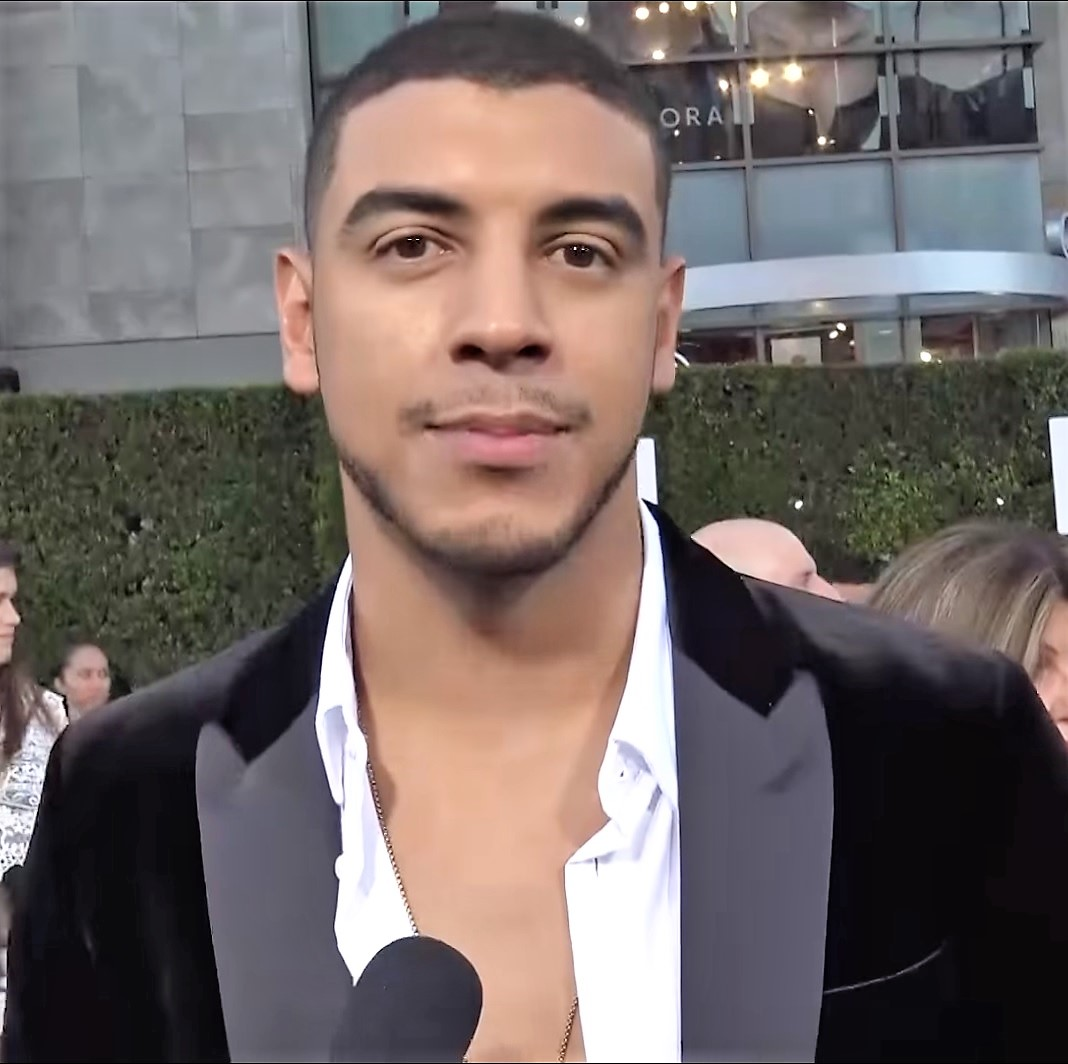
- Medrano in 2017

Background information
- Born: Manuel Alejandro Medrano López; October 29, 1987 (age 38); Bocagrande, Cartagena de Indias, Colombia
- Genres: Latin rock Latin rock, Cumbiapop
- Occupations: Musician, singer, songwriter
- Instruments: Vocals, guitar, Violin, Piano, Trumpet, Flute
- Years active: 2014–present
- Label: Warner Music Group
- Website: www.manuelmedrano.com (in Spanish)

Manuel Alejandro Medrano López (born October 29, 1987), known as Manuel Medrano, is a Colombian pop singer and a winner of two Latin Grammy Awards.

== Start ==
Medrano was born in Cartagena, Colombia. His interest in music began when he failed a school year and, as "punishment," received a guitar. From the age of 16 he began writing songs, which motivated him to start a career as a solo artist.

For several years he played in bars in Bogota while composing his songs, which, years later, made him popular at the national level.

== Recognition ==
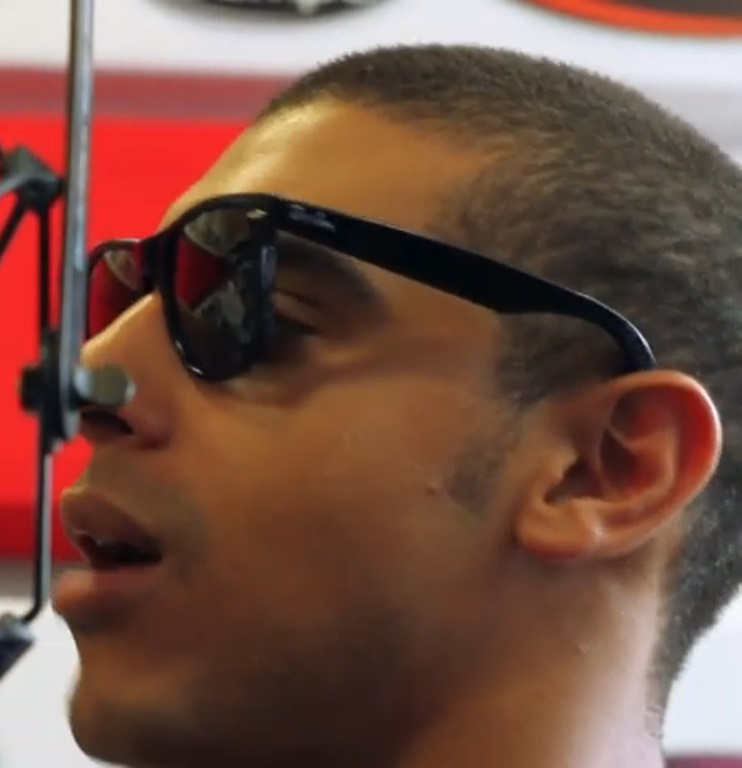
Medrano interviewed on Colombian radio in 2019

In August 2014 he released "Afuera del planeta," his first independent single. Playback of the song increased gradually on national radio to the point of becoming one of the hits of the year. Thanks to this song, he was nominated twice to the Shock music awards: in the Best New Artist and Best Shock Presents categories.

In early 2015 he signed with multinational label Warner Music and, months later, released his second promotional single "Bajo el agua," which accumulated more than 75,000,000 views on YouTube and was well received in Colombia and Mexico.

In the year 2016 he won two Latin Grammy Awards: Best New Artist and Best Songwriting Album.

Manuel Medrano composes romantic music that he calls pop-cast, because it doesn't come from a specific genre, but from various influences of Latin American singer-songwriters.

== Discography ==
- Manuel Medrano (2015)
- Eterno (2021)
- Perfecto (2024)

== Awards and nominations ==
=== Latin Grammy Awards ===
A Latin Grammy Award is an accolade by the Latin Academy of Recording Arts & Sciences to recognize outstanding achievement in the music industry.

Year	Nominee / work	Award	Result
2016	Manuel Medrano	Best New Artist	Won
2016	"Bajo el Agua"	Song of the Year	Nominated
2016	Manuel Medrano	Best Singer-Songwriter Album	Won
