= Annasofia =

Colombian singer/songwriter (born 2001)

Anna Sofia Jaramillo Fatat (born February 26, 2001), better known mononymously as Annasofia, is a Costa Rican-born Colombian singer, songwriter, and producer of Latin pop. Annasofia started playing the drums at age seven. Raised in Tuluá, Valle del Cauca, she mastered several instruments and studied at University of the Andes. She made her professional debut in September 2019 with the single Friends with Benefits and received multiple nominations at the Premios Nuestra Tierra, including Breakthrough Artist in 2022 and Best Pop Song and Best Video of the year for Cómo fue in 2023. In October 2025, she released her debut extended play, Primer Intento and also got nominated for Best New Artist at the 2025 Latin Grammy Awards.

== Early life and education ==
She was born on February 26, 2001 in San José, Costa Rica to Alexandra Fatat and Germán Jaramillo before they returned to Colombia after completed her parent's study. Anna was living in Tuluá, Valle del Cauca from the age of three years old. At 7 years old, she started playing drums before starting to write her own songs at 9 years old. Her aspiration to become a musician started when she attended a concert by Katy Perry when she was 14 years old. Other than drums, she also can play guitar, piano, bass, ukulele, and percussion. After graduating from high school, she studied music at the University of the Andes.

== Discography ==
She debuted with her single titled Friends with benefits in September 2019. Then, she released her debut Extended play Primer Intento with Arthouse/Universal Music Latino in October 2025.

== Awards and nomination ==
In 2022, she was nominated as a Breakthrough artist in Premios Nuestra Tierra 2022, that won by Ryan Castro The next year, her song Cómo fue was nominated in that 2023 award in Best Pop Song category. She was nominated as a Best New Artist at the 2025 Latin Grammy Awards .
