= Isadora Sofia Figueroa =

American singer

Isadora
- Isadora at the 2026 Latin Grammy Awards

Background information
- Born: Isadora Sofia Figueroa Maronesse; December 10, 2000 (age 25); Miami, Florida, U.S.
- Genre: Latin pop
- Occupations: Singer, songwriter
- Years active: 2023–present
- Label: Mariposa Music

Isadora Sofia Figueroa Maronesse (born December 10, 2000, in Miami, Florida), known professionally as Isadora or Isadora Figueroa, is a Latin pop singer. She was nominated in the Best New Artist category at the 2025 Latin Grammy Awards.

== Music career ==
In 2022 Isadora graduated with a degree in music industry and a minor in songwriting from the University of Miami's Frost School of Music. In April 2023 she released her first music video.

Her debut album, La Isla, was released in November 2025 on the label Mariposa Music.

== Personal life ==
Isadora is the daughter of Puerto Rican singer Chayanne. She is the cousin of Venezuelan-American social media star Lele Pons.
