= Yorghaki =

- Born: Yorghaki Yacoub; 3 May 1999 (age 27); Valencia, Venezuela
- Genres: Reggaeton; Afrobeat
- Occupations: Singer; songwriter
- Years active: 2017–present

Yorghaki Yacoub (born 3 May 1999), known professionally as Yorghaki, is a Venezuelan singer-songwriter of the reggaeton and afrobeat genres. In 2025, Alleh & Yorghaki were nominated for the 2025 Premios Juventud to be held in Panama.

== Early years of life ==
Yorghaki was born in Valencia and grew up in Las Mercedes. Born to a Syrian father, he began writing music at age 14. He attended Full Sail University, in Orlando, Florida. His stage name comes from his father's initials. From a young age, he became interested in traditional Colombian music, which led him to write his first song, "La Primera Vez," which was released in a video on his YouTube account in 2017.

== Musical career ==
In 2017, he released his first song, "La Primera Vez." This allowed him to meet other established artists in the genre and release music regularly. In 2022, Yorghaki released his first single with Warner Music Latina called "inigualable" in collaboration with Aloisio.

In 2024, he released his first international hits with Afrobeat-style songs. His album "La ciudad" featured singles like "Capaz," which charted on global playlists. He participated as a producer and composer on the singles "Pa que te rías" and "Frío," without receiving support from record labels. Later, the duo Alleh & Yorghaki was formed. In January 2025, they earned a platinum record in Spain for their single "Capaz (merenguetón)". debuted on the US Billboard charts. The song peaked at number 46 on the Hot Latin Songs chart.

== Discography ==
=== Studio albums ===
- La Ciudad (2024)

=== Extended plays (EP) ===
- Un día a la vez (2021)

=== Singles ===
==== As lead artist ====
- Contra la gravedad (2019)
- Pense (2019)
- Inigualable (2021)
- Pierdo el control (2022)
- Creo que ya (2022)
- La verdad (2022)
- Eivissa (2022)
- Una noche con hugel (2022)
- Dejavu (2023)
- Tú (2024)
- Guerra fría (2024)
- X suerte (2025)

==== As featured artist ====
- Capaz (Yorghaki featuring Alleh)(2024)

== Awards and nominations ==
Award	Year	Recipient(s) and nominee(s)	Category	Result	Ref.
Platino Awards	PROMUSICAE	Alleh & Yorghaki	Best New Latin/Urban Artist	Won	
2025 Premios Juventud	2025 Premios Juventud	Yorghaki	Tropical Mix	Won	
