= Eduardo Cabra =

Puerto Rican musician (born 1979)

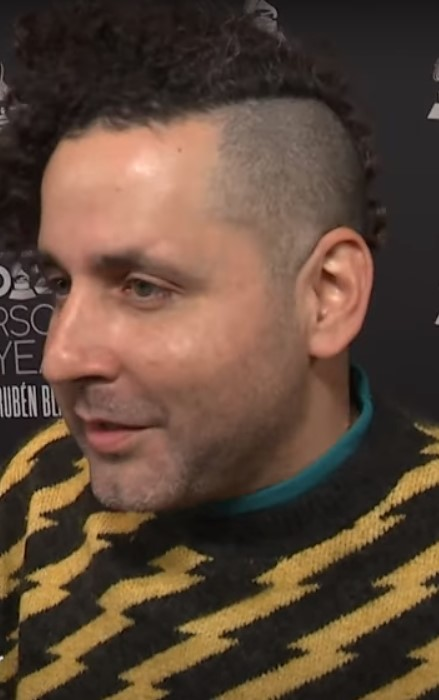
- Cabra in 2021

Background information
- Also known as: Cabra
- Born: Eduardo José Cabra Martínez; September 10, 1979 (age 47); Santurce, San Juan, Puerto Rico
- Genres: Hip hop; urban
- Occupations: Multi-instrumentalist; composer
- Instruments: Vocals; guitar; bass; drums; percussion; keyboards; melodica; harmonica; cuatro; accordion; tres; banjo; mandolin; oud; cümbüş; charango; erke; ukulele; bouzouki; vihuela; harp; autoharp; timple; gittern; cavaquinho; trombone; saxophone; trumpet; violin; clarinet; theremin; kalimba; cello
- Years active: 1995–present
- Member of: Calle 13

Eduardo José Cabra Martínez (Latin American Spanish: [eˈðwarðo xoˈse ˈkaβɾa maɾˈtines]; born September 10, 1979), better known by his stage name "Visitante Calle 13", "Visitante", or more recently, "Cabra", is a Puerto Rican producer, musician, composer, and multi-instrumentalist. He rose to fame in the Puerto Rican band Calle 13, which he co-founded with his step brother René Pérez Joglar (Residente).

Eduardo currently holds a record for 28 awards and 44 Latin Grammy nominations, winning 9 awards in the 2011 ceremony. He also has special recognitions such as the ASCAP Vanguard Award for his contribution to the development of new genres in Latin America. As part of Calle 13, Eduardo collaborated with high-calibre artists such as Shakira, Tom Morello, Silvio Rodríguez and Rubén Blades, among others. Eduardo has worked as producer for such international artists as Bad Bunny, La Vida Bohème, Chambao, Gustavo Cordera and Jorge Drexler.

== Early life ==
Visitante was born in Santurce, San Juan, in Puerto Rico. His father was also a musician. Visitante met his stepbrother, Residente, when they were both two years old, when Residente's mother married Visitante's father. The family developed strong ties to the Puerto Rican arts community; his stepmother, Flor Joglar de Gracia, was an actress in Teatro del Sesenta, a local acting troupe, while his father was still a musician at the time. His stepbrother asserts that he and his family lived a relatively comfortable lifestyle growing up, placing them in a group of Puerto Ricans who are "too poor to be rich and too rich to be poor". Although their parents later divorced, the stepbrothers remained close.

When he was at the seventh grade, Visitante was once reprimanded and taken to the school principal's office for refusing to sing the American national anthem—he would later become a supporter of the Puerto Rican independence, just like Residente.

Residente attended the Savannah College of Art and Design in Savannah, Georgia, where he obtained a master's degree in art, while Visitante continued refining his skills as a musician, directing bands Kampo Viejo and Bayanga. When Residente returned to Puerto Rico the band Calle 13 was almost immediately put together.

== Musical career ==
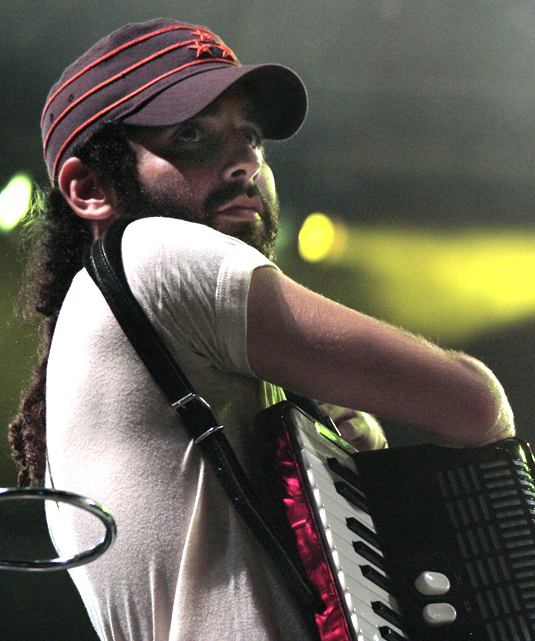
Visitante performing in Nicaragua in 2009

=== Calle 13 ===
Visitante has been a musician most of his life, but it was not until 2004 that he began making music with his stepbrother, giving the band the name Calle 13. The stepbrothers hosted their music on a website, and began searching for a record label in order to release their music commercially. After sending demo tapes to White Lion Records, the duo was offered a record deal. The duo gained recognition for their controversial song "Querido FBI", which responded to the killing of Filiberto Ojeda Ríos, a militant activist in the Puerto Rican independence movement.

Cabra chose his stage name "Visitante" because that is how he had to identify himself to the guard every time he returned to his brother's house in Trujillo Alto. Visitante's influences come from numerous musical genres. Artists that were influential on him included salsa master Rubén Blades, singer-songwriter Silvio Rodríguez and writer Tite Curet Alonso. As musical director of Calle 13, he created several popular rhythms and elevated the group to significant standing in the genre.

Eduardo functioned as multi-instrumentalist, musical director, arranger, and producer of every album the band released during their 10 year career. All together, Visitante and his band Calle 13 have won 19 Latin Grammy Awards and 3 Grammys, the most by any group.

==== Debut album ====
In January 2006, their first album, Calle 13, was released and was a large success. The band won its first three Latin Grammys, and became the group with the most wins that year.

==== Internationalization ====
After the unexpected success of the initial album and after traveling around Latin America looking for inspiration, they released their second album Residente o Visitante in 2007. For this album, he collaborated for the first time with international artists such as La Mala Rodríguez, Vicentico and Bajofondo Tangoclub, among others. This was the band's first album to reach number 1 on the Billboard charts and the album for which they won their first Grammy Award for Best Latin Urban Album.

"Entren Los Que Quieran" is the album with the most Latin Grammy Awards in history, and Eduardo was nominated for the first time as best individual producer by the Grammy Awards.

After the band became known world-wide, and obtained multiple recognitions, Multi Viral was released, an ambitious album that took a year to record and whose production was made almost entirely in La Casa del Sombrero, Eduardo's production label. The record was produced by his own record label and was mixed by Michael Brower and Ritch Costey. For this album, Eduardo was nominated for the second time as the best producer of the year at the Latin Grammy Awards.

In 2015, he decided to take a break to take on individual projects.

=== Cabra ===
In 2020, he began his solo music career as CABRA, shining the spotlight on him as a vocalist for the first time. On July 17, 2020, Eduardo releases his first single "La Cabra Jala Pal Monte". This single was produced by himself and composed next to Rita Indiana. Its release came with an official video which was filmed in Buenos Aires and directed by Nicolás Sedano. "La Cabra Jala Pal Monte" was also the first release of his own label, La Casa del Sombrero. This song blends electronic sounds with a strong and fresh Latin percussion, creating a hip hop song mixed with his own avant-garde and risky style. In the lyrics, he presents himself as a singer and recounts the end of Visitor as the beginning of "Cabra".

His second single, "La Ventana", was released on September 9, 2020.

On March 2, 2021, he shared his third single, "Gris", through which CABRA gives an interesting twist to his musical concept, introducing us to a new side of introspective lyrics and sound within his repertoire. The music video was directed by the visual collaborator of Trending Tropics, Niko Sedano and César Berrios, who portray the attitude of CABRA towards the responsibilities and blame that fall on him.

On May 31, 2021, Cabra debuted with his first self-titled EP, which includes "La Cabra Jala Pal Monte", "La Ventana" and "Gris", and comes with three additional songs, "Lingote", "Un Belén" and "Quisiera Ser Un Meme". Eduardo collaborates with his daughter Azul in the song "Quisiera Ser Un Meme", which criticizes the need for artists to go viral, drifting away from the artistic purpose of communicating and making art.

== As a musical producer ==
In 2013, Eduardo began his career as an independent musical producer with the production of Cuban singer Diana Fuentes's debut album. Since then, Eduardo has worked with many established artists, as well as helped smaller artists obtain industry recognition through his work and musical productions. Trending Tropics, a project Eduardo worked on with his partner Vicente Garca in which they explored diverse sound textures and experimented with new materials, is proof of this, as he tells us in an exclusive interview for Rolling Stone Colombia.

He was given the opportunity to produce a song written by Sie7e and performed by Pedro Capó for a Pepsi commercial campaign in 2021. Gibson is another brand that has lately placed its trust in Eduardo. Additionally, has worked with Rita Indiana, Abel Pintos, Diana Fuentes, Vicente García, La Vida Boheme, Monsieur Periné, Chambao, Gustavo Cordera and Jorge Drexler, among many others.

Cabra is the producer with the most Latin Grammy nominations and awards, with a total of 45 nominations and 28 wins.

=== La Casa del Sombrero ===
La Casa Del Sombrero is a boutique label based in San Juan, Puerto Rico. It serves as a creative incubator for artists whose work is based on cultural truths in their self-expression. With Cabra as the driving force behind the venture, the label focuses entirely on the artist and their creative process, enriching the A&R experience. Artists that have worked with LCDS include Diana Fuentes, Sebastian Otero, and Eduardo Cabra himself for his solo debut.

=== Trending Tropics ===
In summer of 2017, Eduardo began collaborating with Vicente García on a project called Trending Tropics.

On July 11, 2018, it was presented live during a rehearsal open to the public in La Respuesta (Santurce) as part of the preparations for his show at the SummerStage in NYC. The artistic concept of Trending Topics deals with the distorted relationship of human beings and the technology that surrounds them. Musicians who have already joined Eduardo and Vicente for Trending Tropics include Carlos Alomar (David Bowie's guitarist), Ziggy Marley, Pucho y Guille (members of Vetusta Morla), Ana Tijoux, Jorge Drexler, Li Saumet (Bomba Estéreo), iLe, Amayo (from Antibalas), Acentoh or Wiso G, among others.

=== Cabratón ===
By the end of 2020, Eduardo created the virtual activity "Cabratón", whose main objective is to connect the producer with his followers and foster a space for creative interaction.

It functions by CABRA creating a new track live on his YouTube profile and then airing it through his SoundCloud profile. He invites people to download it and encourages them to add to the production through acapellas (voices), instruments or any type of session added to the track.

Participants have a deadline to submit their music. In the following days, CABRA makes a detailed review of the submitted materials, evaluating the combination of ideas, aesthetics and genres in order to select several singles and produce an EP.

== Discography ==
With Calle 13

- 2005: Calle 13
- 2007: Residente o Visitante
- 2008: Los de Atrás Vienen Conmigo
- 2010: Entren Los Que Quieran
- 2014: Multi Viral

=== Compositions ===
- 2006: «No hay igual» (by Nelly Furtado)
- 2007: «Beautiful Liar» (by Beyoncé y Shakira)
- 2010: «Gordita» (from the album Sale el sol by Shakira)
- 2013: «Todo Cae» (from the album Bailar en la Cueva by Jorge Drexler)
- 2019: «Mario Neta» (from the album Jueves by Cuarteto de Nos)
- 2021: «Somos» (single in collaboration with Guaynaa)
- 2021: «Tarantinero» (from the album 777: A Quemarropa by LosPetitFellas)

== Productions ==
- 2013: Todo cae, Jorge Drexler
- 2015: Caja de Música, Monsieur Periné
- 2016: A la mar, Vicente García
- 2016: Tecnoanimal, Gustavo Cordera
- 2016: Nuevo Ciclo, Chambao
- 2016: Somos, Swing Original Monks
- 2017: Sofá, Silvina Moreno
- 2018: Encanto Tropical, Monsieur Periné
- 2018: Trending Tropics junto con Vicente García
- 2019: Candela, Vicente García
- 2019: Jueves, El Cuarteto de Nos
- 2019: Para Remendar el Cielo, Diana Fuentes Ft. Seu Jorge
- 2020: Mi Derriengue, Riccie Oriach
- 2020: 2030, LOUTA
- 2020: After School, Rita Indiana
- 2020: Mandinga Times, Rita Indiana
- 2020: Dulce y Salado, Pedro Capó Ft. Visitante
- 2021: Amor En Mi Vida, Abel Pintos
- 2021: Atravesao, Elsa y Elmar
- 2021: Fiesta en lo del Dr. Hermes, El Cuarteto de Nos
- 2021: El Arca de Mima, Mima

=== Casa del Sombrero ===
- 2014: Planeta Planetario, Diana Fuentes
- 2020: La Cabra Jala P'al Monte, CABRA
- 2020: Juyendo, Sebastián Otero
- 2020: La Ventana, CABRA
- 2020: Cabratón Vol.1
- 2021: Gris, CABRA
- 2021: CABRA (EP)

== Filmography ==
- 2006 – My Block: Puerto Rico (documentary), as himself.
- 2009 – Mercedes Sosa, Cantora un viaje íntimo (documentary), as himself.
- 2009 – Calle 13: Sin Mapa (documentary), as himself.

== Public appearances ==
- 2017 – Hablando La Música Se Entiende (TEDxBerkleeValencia).
- 2020 – A Conversation with... Eduardo Cabra (BIME PRO).
- 2020 – Un Shot con CABRA: La Muerte de Visitante (Corriente Perú).
- 2020 – Fábrica de hits en la nueva normalidad (Resonancia Colombia).
- 2021 – Ecosistemas Musicales del FUTURO (FUTURX Argentina).
- 2021 – Eduardo Cabra by Javier Andrade (Latin Alternative Music Conference).
- 2021 – Amazessions: CABRA (Amazon Music).
- 2021 – Final Panel: Jury Of Honor (Red Bull Battle US).
- 2021 – Person Of The Year: Rubén Blades (22nd Latin Grammy Awards Ceremony).

== Awards and nominations ==
=== Grammy Awards ===
Year	Nominee / work	Award	Result
2008	Residente o Visitante	Best Latin Urban Album	Won
2010	Los de Atras Vienen Conmigo	Best Latin Urban Album	Won
2015	Multi Viral	Best Latin Rock, Urban or Alternative Album	Won

=== Latin Grammy Awards ===
Year	Nominee / work	Award	Result
2006	Calle 13	Best New Artist	Won
2006	Calle 13	Best Urban Music Album	Won
2006	"Atrévete-te-te"	Best Short Form Music Video	Won
2007	Residente o Visitante	Album of the Year	Nominated
2007	Residente o Visitante	Best Urban Music Album	Won
2007	"Pa'l Norte" (feat Orishas)	Best Urban Song	Won
2007	"Tango del Pecado"	Best Short Form Music Video	Nominated
2009	Los de Atrás Vienen Conmigo	Album of the Year	Won
2009	Los de Atrás Vienen Conmigo	Best Urban Music Album	Won
2009	"No Hay Nadie Como Tu" (featuring Café Tacuba)	Record of the Year	Won
2009	"No Hay Nadie Como Tu" (featuring Café Tacuba)	Best Alternative Song	Won
2009	"La Perla" (featuring Rubén Blades)	Best Short Form Music Video	Won
2011	Entren Los Que Quieran	Album of the Year	Won
2011	Entren Los Que Quieran	Best Urban Music Album	Won
2011	"Latinoamérica" (featuring Totó la Momposina, Susana Baca and Maria Rita)	Record of the Year	Won
2011	"Latinoamérica"	Song of the Year	Won
2011	Shakira's "Sale el Sol" (Composer)	Album of the Year	Nominated
2011	Shakira's "Sale el Sol" (Composer)	Best Pop Vocal Album	Won
2011	"Calma Pueblo"	Best Alternative Song	Won
2011	"Baile de los Pobres" (featuring Rafa Arcaute)	Best Urban Song	Won
2011	"Vamo' a Portarnos Mal"	Best Tropical Song	Won
2011	Rafael Arcaute and Calle 13	Producer of the Year	Won
2011	"Calma Pueblo"	Best Short Form Music Video	Won
2014	Multi Viral	Best Urban Music Album	Won
2014	"Respira el Momento"	Record of the Year	Nominated
2014	"Ojos Color Sol" (feat Silvio Rodríguez)	Song of the Year	Nominated
2014	"El Aguante"	Best Alternative Song	Won
2014	"Adentro"	Best Urban Song	Nominated
2014	"Cuando los Pies Besan el Piso"	Best Urban Contemporary Album	Nominated
2014	"Adentro"	Best Urban Performance	Nominated
2014	"Adentro"	Best Short Form Music Video	Nominated
2015	"Ojos Color Sol" (feat Silvio Rodríguez)	Best Short Form Music Video	Won
2015	"Así de Grandes Son las Ideas"	Best Short Form Music Video	Nominated
2017	Visitante	Producer of the Year	Won
2021	"CABRA (EP)"	Best Alternative Music Album	Nominated
2022	Eduardo Cabra	Producer of the Year	Nominated
2022	"ya no somos los mismos"	Album of the Year	Nominated
2023	Eduardo Cabra	Producer of the Year	Nominated
2023	"Martinez"	Best Alternative Music Album	Nominated
2024	Eduardo Cabra	Producer of the Year	Nominated
2025	In the Summers	Latin Grammy Award for Visual Best Music for Visual Media	Nominated
2025	"Puñito de Yocahú"	Latin Grammy Award for Album of the Year	Nominated
2025	"Puñito de Yocahú"	Best Contemporary Tropical Album	Won

=== Billboard Latin Music Awards ===
Year	Nominee / work	Award	Result
2007	Calle 13	Best Reggaeton Album	Won
2009	"No Hay Nadie Como Tu"	Hot Latin Song of the Year Vocal Duet or Collaboration	Won

=== Lo Nuestro Awards ===
Year	Nominee / work	Award	Result
2008	"Pa'l Norte"	Video of the Year	Won
2009	"Un Beso de Desayuno"	Video of the Year	Won
2010	"No Hay Nadie Como Tu"	Collaboration of the Year	Won

=== Los Premios MTV Latinoamérica ===
Year	Nominee / work	Award	Result
2006	Calle 13	Promising Artist	Won
2007	Calle 13	Best Urban Artist	Won
2009	Calle 13	Best Urban Artist	Won

=== Instituto Cubano de la Música ===
Year	Nominee / work	Award	Result
2010	Calle 13	Premio Internacional Cubadisco	Won

=== Ateneo Puertorriqueño ===
Year	Nominee / work	Award	Result
2011	Calle 13	Medalla Ramón Emeterio Betances	Won

=== Premios El País - Babelia ===
Year	Nominee / work	Award	Result
2021	CABRA	Músicas del Mundo - Latinoamérica y El Caribe	Won
