= A La Mar =

Studio album by Vicente García
- Released: August 26, 2016
- Genre: Bachata, merengue, pop
- Length: 56:32

Vicente García chronology
| Melodrama (2010) | A La Mar (2016) | Candela (2019) |

A La Mar is the second studio album by Dominican musician Vicente García, released on August 26, 2016.

== Background and accolades ==
The album marks García's first collaboration with Calle 13 producer Visitante. The collaboration inspired García to deviate from mainstream bachata and incorporate a variety of genres into the album: the artist recalled, "I [didn't] want to be that guy that just does Caribbean music". García won three awards including Best New Artist at the 2017 Latin Grammy Awards. The song "Bachata en Kingston" from A La Mar won Best Tropical Song at the ceremony. A La Mar was ranked by the Los Angeles Times as the best album of the decade by any Dominican artist.

== Track listing ==
| No. | Title | Writer(s) | Length |
|---|---|---|---|
| 1. | "A La Mar" | García | 3:31 |
| 2. | "Dulcito e Coco" | García | 3:09 |
| 3. | "Carmesí" | García | 3:01 |
| 4. | "Espuma y Arrecife" | García | 4:04 |
| 5. | "Pa Nuevayor" | García | 1:10 |
| 6. | "Amor Pretao" | García | 3:04 |
| 7. | "She Prays" | García | 3:05 |
| 8. | "El Yeyo" | García | 2:52 |
| 9. | "Mal de Amore" | García | 3:29 |
| 10. | "Bachata en Kingston" | García | 3:59 |
| 11. | "Bohío" | García | 3:16 |
| 12. | "La Paloma" | García | 1:11 |
| 13. | "La Esquinita" | García | 3:59 |
| 14. | "Zafra Negra" | García | 3:40 |
| 15. | "La Paloma" | García | 1:11 |
| 16. | "Te Soñé (Bonus Track)" | García | 3:26 |
