= Lucas Arnau =

Colombian singer-songwriter

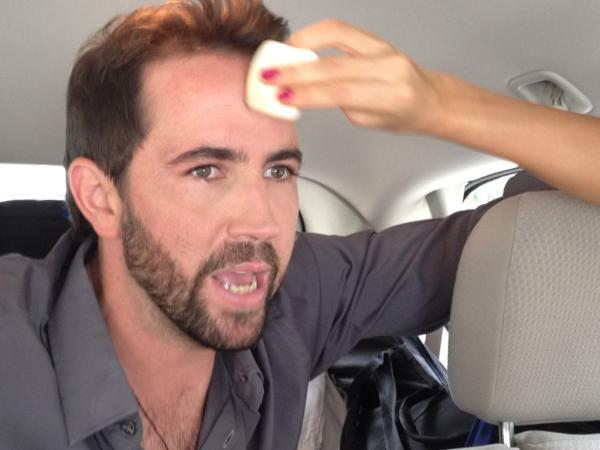

Background information
- Born: Lucas Arnau Fernandez; May 16, 1979 (age 46)
- Origin: Medellín, Colombia
- Genres: Latin pop; Tropipop
- Occupation: Singer-songwriter
- Instrument: Guitar
- Years active: 2000–present
- Labels: Sony BMG
- Website: www.lucasarnau.com

Lucas Arnau (born May 16, 1979) is a Colombian singer-songwriter.

== Early life ==
Lucas Arnau was born on May 16, 1979 in Medellín. His musical curiosity started at a very young age inspired by his father's singing and songwriting. His mother, a creative director for an Advertising Agency in Colombia, was also an important influence in Arnau's artistic interests. Arnau wrote his first song at age 11 and was able to sing it at the age of 23.

== Albums ==
Arnau's first album, "Un Poco Más" was produced by Jose Gaviria and Andres Munera in Miami, Florida and was released in Latin America in April 2004.

His second album, "Rompecabezas" was launched in August 2006 and has been very well welcomed by his fans in Colombia, and Latin America. The album was produced by Grammy and Latin Grammy award-winning songwriter/producer Luis F. Ochoa in Miami, Florida and co-produced by Lucas Arnau and David Cardenas.

Both albums have been a smash hit in Latin America, especially in Colombia, Peru and Ecuador.

== Awards and nominations ==
Lucas Arnau was awarded Shock Magazine's Best Colombian Pop Artist on September 21, 2007.

=== Latin Grammy Awards ===
A Latin Grammy Award is an accolade by the Latin Academy of Recording Arts & Sciences to recognize outstanding achievement in the music industry.

Year	Nominee / work	Award	Result
2015	Buen Camino	Best Contemporary Tropical Album	Nominated
2017	Teatro	Best Contemporary Tropical Album	Nominated
