= Latin Grammy Award for Best Contemporary Tropical Album =

Music award category

- Awarded for: vocal or instrumental tropical music albums containing at least 51% playing time of newly recorded material
- Country: United States
- Presented by: The Latin Recording Academy
- First award: 2002
- Currently held by: Vicente García for Puñito de Yocahú (2025)
- Website: latingrammy.com

The Latin Grammy Award for Best Contemporary Tropical Album is an honor presented annually at the Latin Grammy Awards, a ceremony that recognizes excellence and promotes a wider awareness of cultural diversity and contributions of Latin recording artists in the United States and internationally. According to the category description guide for the 13th Latin Grammy Awards, the award is for vocal or instrumental contemporary tropical albums containing at least 51 percent playing time of newly recorded material. It is awarded to solo artists or groups; if the work is a tribute album or collection of live performances, the award is presented only to the directors or producers.

The category included cumbia and vallenato recordings until the introduction of Best Cumbia/Vallenato Album at the 7th Annual Latin Grammy Awards in 2006. In January 2008, the award for Best Merengue Album was discontinued due to a shortage of submissions, resulting in merengue recordings becoming eligible in the Best Contemporary Tropical Album category. The accolade for Best Contemporary Tropical Album was first presented to Colombia singer Carlos Vives at the 3rd Annual Latin Grammy Awards in 2002 for his album Déjame Entrar (2001). Vives holds the record for the most victories, with six.

== Winners and nominees ==
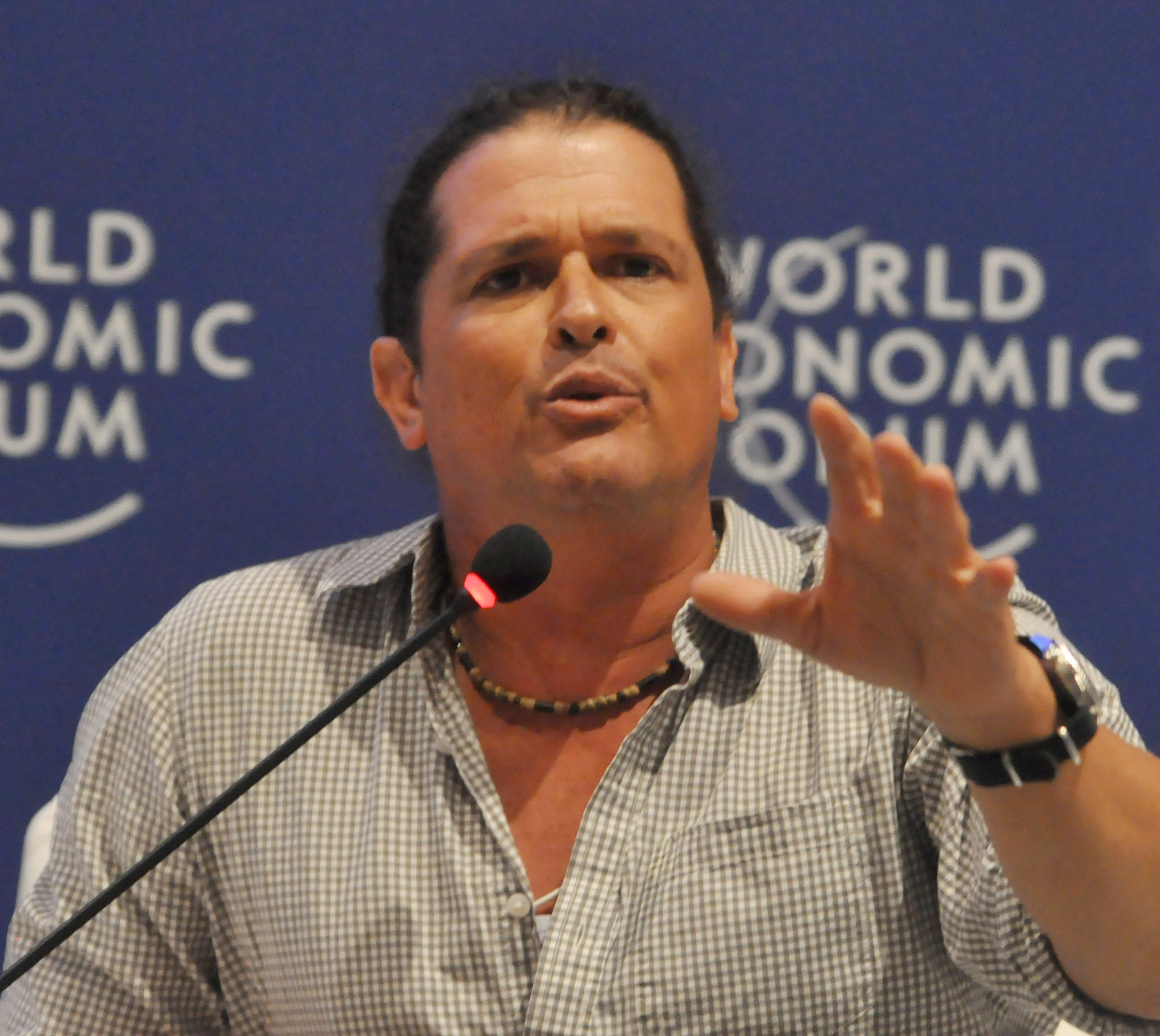
Colombian singer Carlos Vives was the first winner of this award in 2000 for Déjame Entrar. Additionally, he has won five more times, in 2005, 2014, 2018, 2020 and 2022.

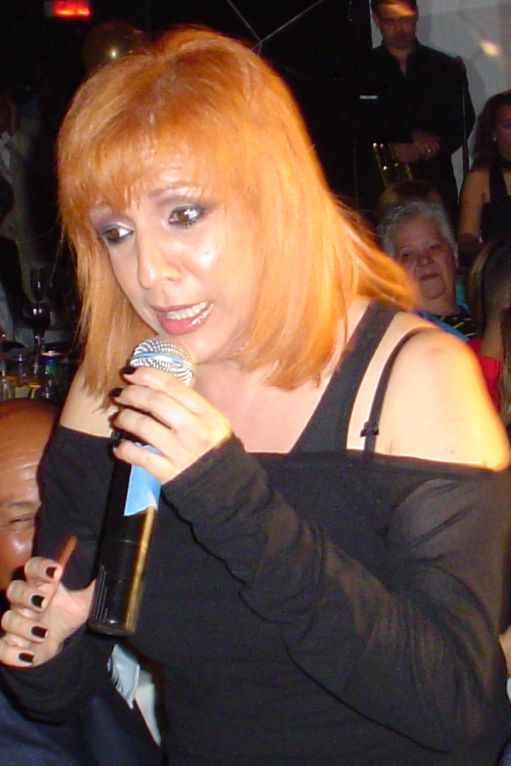
2004 winner Albita, the first female recipient of the award.

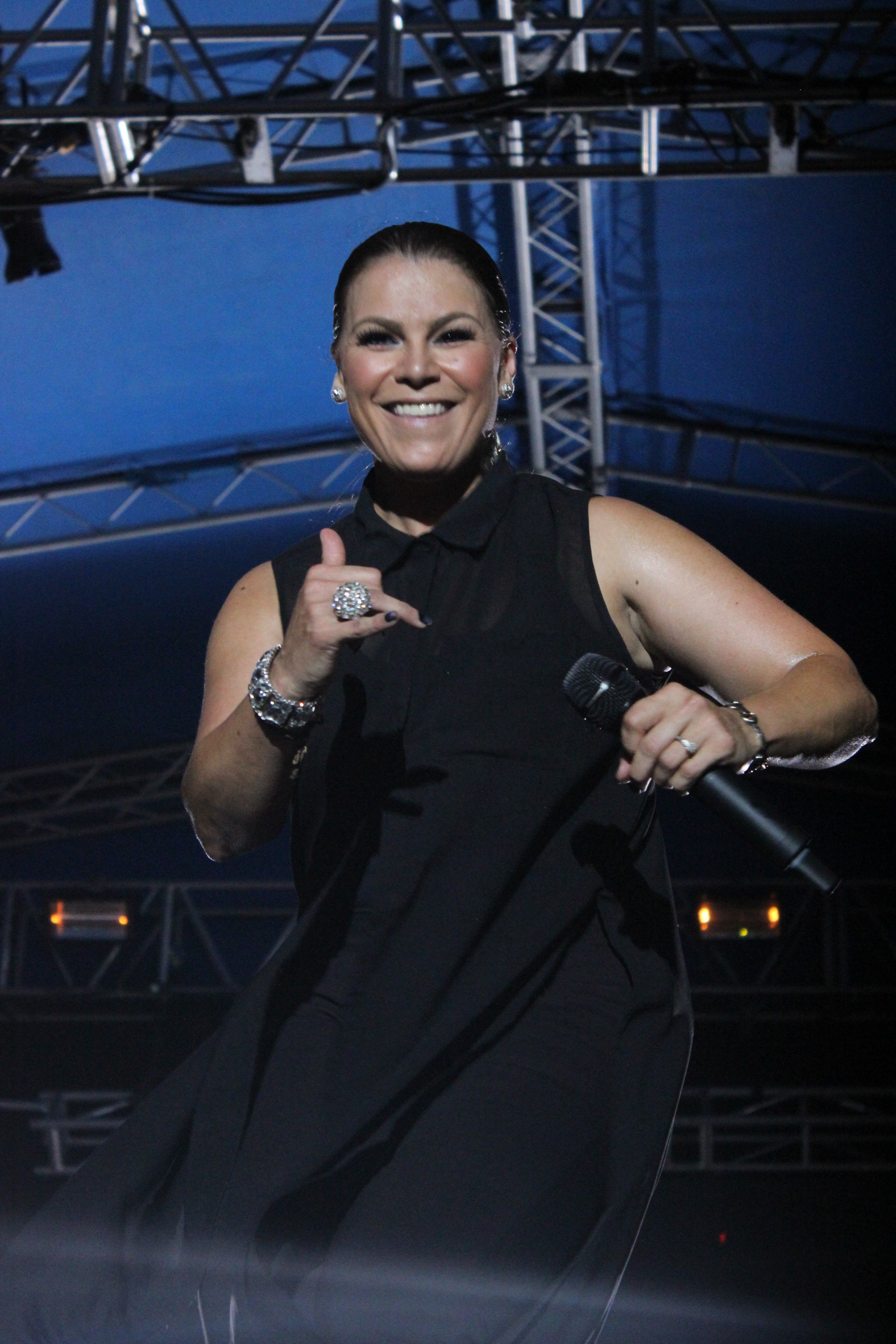
2006 winner, Puerto Rican singer Olga Tañón.

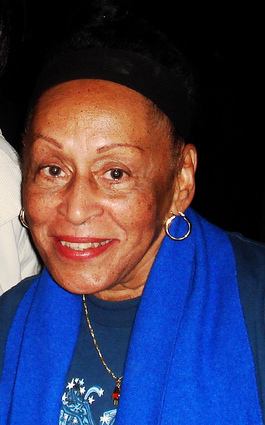
2009 winner Omara Portuondo.

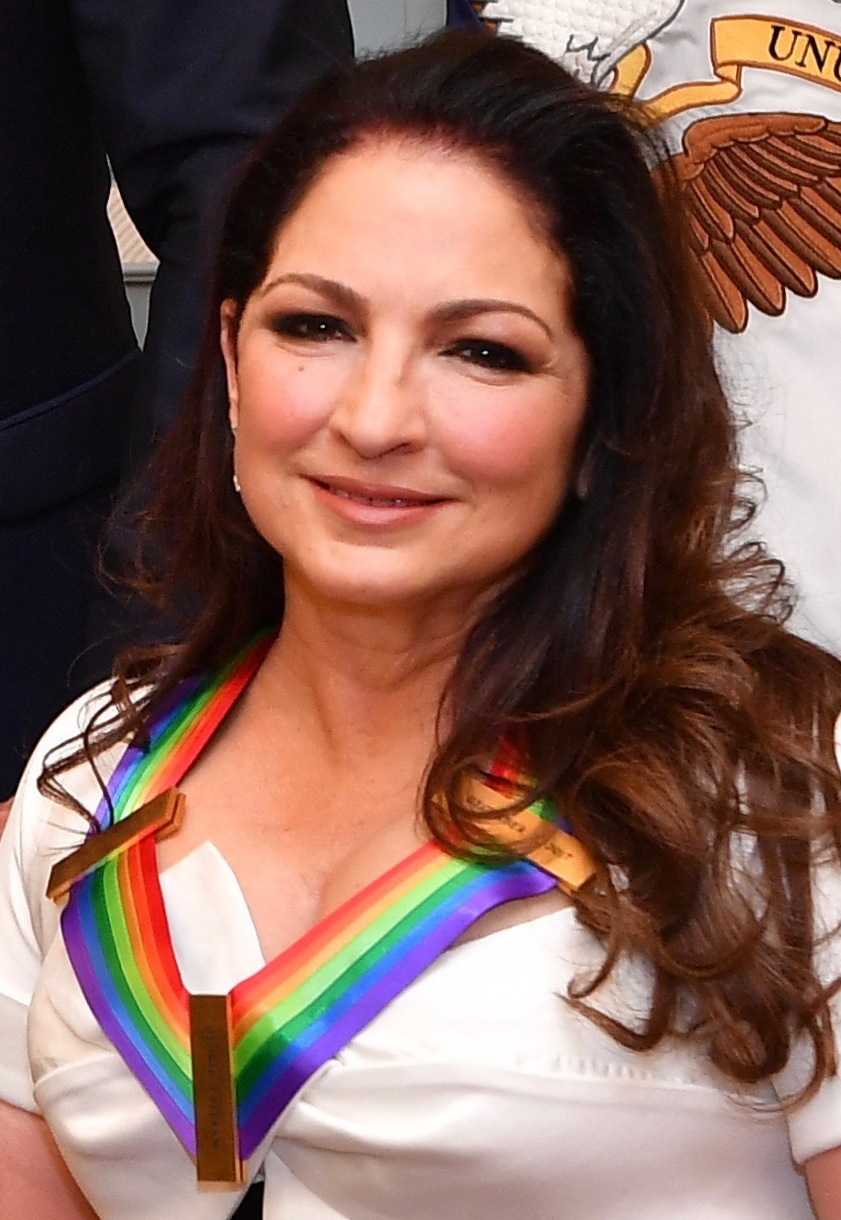
2021 winner Gloria Estefan.

Year	Performing artist(s)	Work	Nominees	Ref.
2002	(Colombia) Carlos Vives	Déjame Entrar	Felix D'Oleo – Frutos; Celso Piña – Barrio Bravo; Síntesis – Habana A Flor De Piel; Vocal Sampling – Cambio De Tiempo	
2003	(Panama) Rubén Blades	Mundo	Charanga Habanera – Live In The USA; Ry Cooder and Manuel Galbán – Mambo Sinuendo; Juan Formell and Los Van Van – En El Malecón De La Habana; Monchy & Alexandra – Confesiones...	
2004	(Cuba) Albita	Albita Llegó	Andy Andy – Necesito Un Amor; Huey Dunbar – Music for My Peoples; Frank Reyes – Cuando Se Quiere Se Puede; Mickey Taveras – Sigo Siendo Romántico	
2005	(Colombia) Carlos Vives	El Rock de Mi Pueblo	Bachá – Bachá; Juan Formell and Los Van Van – Chapeando; Monchy & Alexandra – Hasta El Fin; Michael Stuart – Sin Miedo; Various Artists – Cuba Le Canta A Serrat	
2006	(Puerto Rico) Olga Tañón	Una Nueva Mujer	Cabas – Puro Cabas; Ciclón – Ciclón; Fonseca – Corazón; Chichi Peralta – Más Que Suficiente	
2007	(Venezuela) Oscar D'León	Fuzionando	Albita – Live At The Colony Theater; Aventura – K.O.B. Live; Richie Ray & Bobby Cruz – A Lifetime Of Hits... Live At Centro De Bellas Artes, San Juan, Puerto Rico; Nino Segarra – De Nino A Nino: Homenaje A Nino Bravo	
2008	(Puerto Rico) José Feliciano	Señor Bachata	Joe Arroyo – El Súper Joe; Fonseca – Gratitud; Adriana Lucía – Porro Nuevo; Olga Tañón – Éxitos en Dos Tiempos	
2009	(Cuba) Omara Portuondo	Gracias	Coronel – Superstición; Eddy Herrera – Paso Firme; Daniel Santacruz – Radio Rompecorazones; Sin Ánimo De Lucro – Todo Pasa Por Algo	
2010	(Dominican Republic) Juan Luis Guerra	A Son de Guerra	Lucrecia – Album de Cuba; Prince Royce – Prince Royce; Tecupae – Tiempo; Johnny Ventura – Volvio La Navidad	
2011	(Puerto Rico) Tito El Bambino	El Patrón: Invencible	Héctor Acosta – Obligame; Monchy & Nathalia – Monchy & Nathalia; Daniel Santacruz – Bachata Stereo; Paula Zuleta – Mezcla Soy	
2012	(Dominican Republic) Milly Quezada	Aqui Estoy Yo	Maía – Instinto; Gaitanes – Caminos; Juan Formell and Los Van Van – La Maquinaria; Elaín – Volando Alto - Made on the Road	
2013	(Dominican Republic) Juan Luis Guerra	Asondeguerra Tour	Leslie Grace – Leslie Grace; Guaco – Escultura; Toby Love– Amor Total; Vocal Song – Amarle	
2014	(Colombia) Carlos Vives	Más Corazón Profundo	Julio César – Todo Empieza Soñando; Jorge Luis Chacín – El Color De Mi Locura...; Palo! – Palo! Live; Prince Royce – Soy el Mismo	
2015	(Dominican Republic) Juan Luis Guerra 4.40	Todo Tiene Su Hora	Lucas Arnau – Buen Camino; Leslie Grace – Lloviendo Estrellas; Guaco – Presente Continuo; Johnny Sky – Johnny Sky	
2016	(Venezuela) Guaco	Guaco Histórico 2	Héctor Acosta – Merengue y Sentimiento; David Calzado & Charanga Habanera – Vivito y Coleando; Toño Restrepo – En La Sala con El Joe; Daniel Santacruz– Toda la Vida; Charlie Zaa– Mi Mejor Regalo	
2017	(Venezuela) Guaco	Bidimensional	Lucas Arnau – Teatro; Gaitanes – La Parranda de Gaitanes; Frank Reyes– Devuelveme mi Libertad; Prince Royce– FIVE	
2018	(Colombia) Carlos Vives	Vives	Elvis Crespo – Diomedizao; Milton Salcedo – Presenta: Swing 80; Daniel Santacruz – Momentos de Cine; Romeo Santos – Golden	
2019	(Dominican Republic) Juan Luis Guerra 4.40	Literal	Iván Barrios – Barrios De Mi Tierra (Rubén Blades' songs); Vicente García – Candela; Ilegales – Tropicalia; Milly Quezada – Milly & Company	
2020	(Colombia) Carlos Vives	Cumbiana	El Caribefunk – Energía Para Regalar; Riccie Oriach – Mi Derriengue; Omara Portuondo – Mariposas; Prince Royce – Alter Ego	
2021	(Cuba) Gloria Estefan	Brazil305	Billos – Legendarios; Diana Burco – Río Abajo; Pedrito Martínez – Acertijos; Juventino Ojito y Su Son Mocaná – La Música del Carnaval - XX Aniversario	
2022	(Colombia) Carlos Vives	Cumbiana II	Jorge Luis Chacín – El Mundo está Loco; Gente De Zona – De Menor a Mayor; Marissa Mur – All Inclusive; Pavel Núñez – Tropico	
2023	(Venezuela) Luis Fernando Borjas	5:10 AM	Mike Bahía – Contigo; Silvestre Dangond – Intruso; Gusi – 24/7; Ilegales – Otro Color	
2024	(Colombia) Fonseca	Tropicalia	Jeremy Bosch – Epílogo: La Clave del Tiempo; Camilo – cuatro; Gusi – Monte Adentro; Ilegales – La Fiesta	
2025	(Dominican Republic) Vicente García	Puñito de Yocahú	Mike Bahía – Calidosa; Pedrito Martinez – Ilusión Óptica; Alain Pérez – Bingo; Puerto Candelaria – Fiesta Candelaria	

== Notes ==
^{^[I]} Each year is linked to the article about the Latin Grammy Awards held that year.
^{^[II]} Showing the name of the performer and the nominated album

== See also ==
- Grammy Award for Best Tropical Latin Album
