= Vicente García (musician) =

Dominican singer (born 1968)

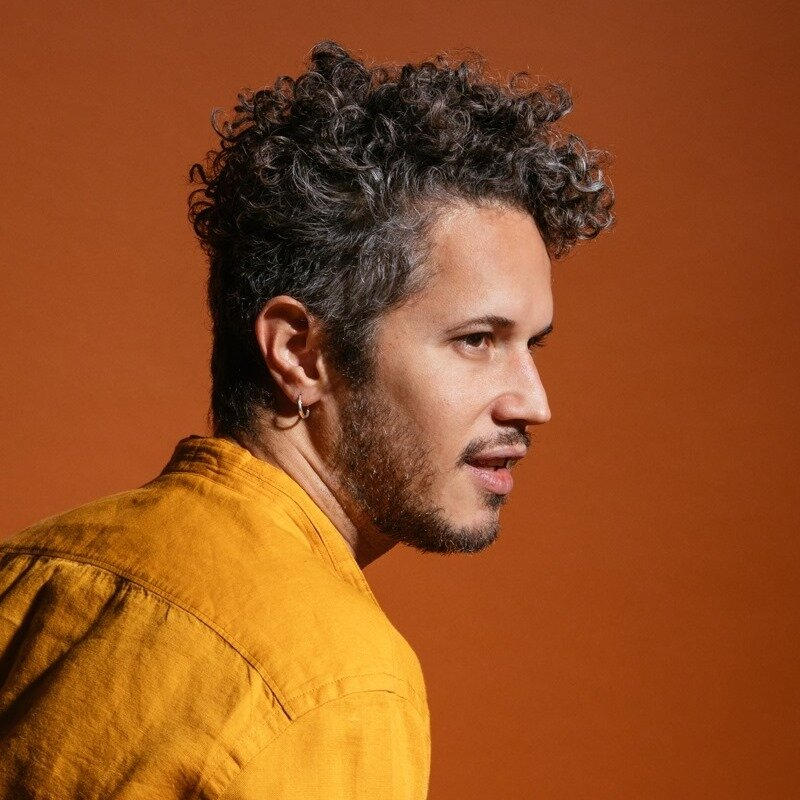
- García in 2022

Background information
- Born: Vicente Luis García Guillén; March 30, 1983 (age 43); Santo Domingo, Dominican Republic
- Genres: Latin; pop
- Occupations: Musician; singer; composer
- Instruments: Vocals; guitar; piano
- Years active: 2002–present
- Labels: Capitol Latin; Sony Music
- Website: vicentegarcia.io (in Spanish)

Vicente Luis García Guillén (born March 30, 1983) is a Dominican musician, singer and composer. He is the former lead singer of the Dominican alternative rock band Calor Urbano, which he left in 2010 to pursue a solo career. Garcia has collaborated in concerts with renowned artists such as Juan Luis Guerra, Alejandro Sanz, Cultura Profetica, Juanes, Ximena Sariñana, Louis Michael Figueroa and Maná among others. He has won four Latin Grammy awards including Best New Artist in 2017 and was nominated for the Grammy awards in 2020.

Born and raised in the Dominican Republic, García developed an interest in various musical genres at a young age. He served as the frontman of Calor Urbano from 2002 to 2010, after which he pursued a solo career. Upon beginning his solo career, García incorporated influences of traditional Dominican genres such as bachata and merengue with modern styles of reggae, funk, and hip-hop. His solo albums are Melodrama (2010), and A La Mar (2016), and Candela (2019). He also released an experimental collaborative album with producer Visitante of Calle 13 entitled Trending Tropics in 2018.

== Early life ==
Vicente García was born on March 30, 1983, in the city of Santo Domingo, the capital of the Dominican Republic. He is the third son of Vicente José García Siragusa and Ani Guillén Pelegrin. From a young age he began to show great interest in music, growing up in a house where the art played an important role in daily life, with a father who came from a family of musicians. His earliest musical memory includes listening to bachata artist Juan Luis Guerra, with García stating, "All my really big memories from when I was a kid, going to the beach, hanging out with my parents on Sundays, all those are hooked to Juan Luis' music". As a teenager, he developed an interest in punk rock and hard rock, and was a fan of Rage Against the Machine and Deftones. He also served as the frontman for an R&B/funk group.

== Career ==
=== 2002–10: Calor Urbano ===
Garcia began his career in 2002 as a member of the Dominican group Calor Urbano, with whom he was a vocalist and composer, With the group recorded one album, which won several awards. The group was invited to tour with Juan Luis Guerra, which reinvigorated García's interest in traditional Dominican music and inspired him to incorporate genres such as bachata and merengue into his music. He noted, "That's when I realized that Dominican music has this power to make people dance and saw how people got really interested in our culture [through Guerra's music]". After touring with Calor Urbano, he returned to the Dominican Republic in 2010 and announced he was leaving the group to pursue a solo career.

=== 2010–2017: Solo career beginnings, Melodrama, and A La Mar ===
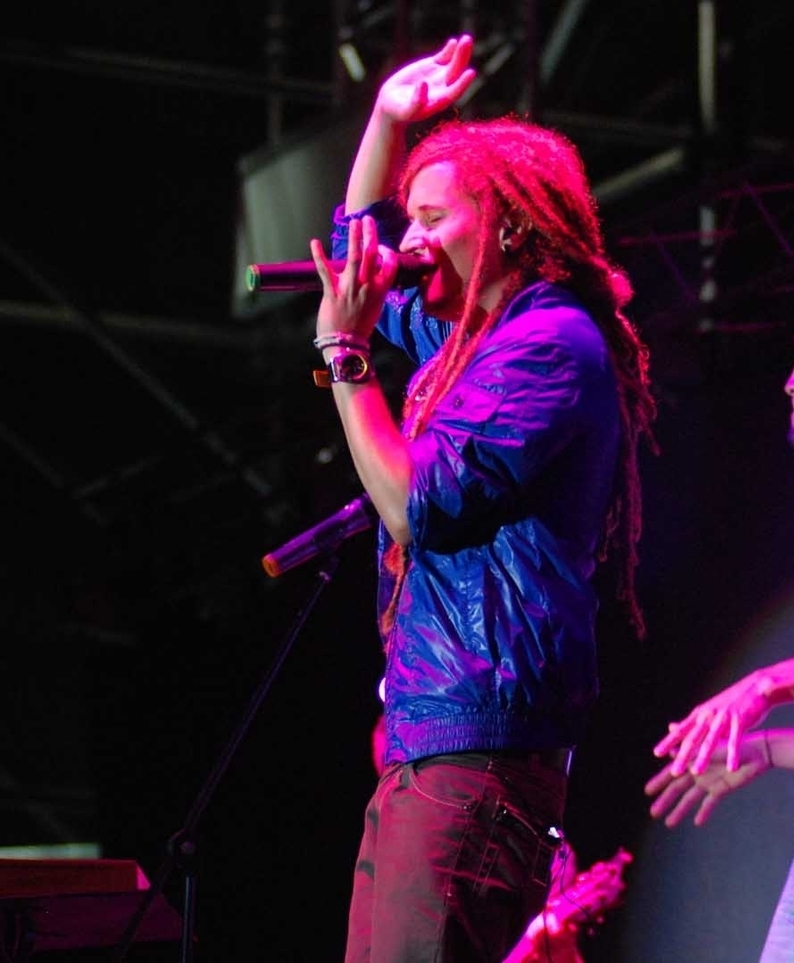
García performing in November 2014.

On August 9, 2010, García signed in Hollywood, California, with the label Capitol Latin, with whom he launched his first solo album titled Melodrama. On August 25 he released his first single, "Cómo Has Logrado". The album was released on October 26. García debuted as a soloist in front of over 14,000 people in the KQ Live Concert event in San Juan, Puerto Rico, where he shared the stage with Juan Luis Guerra, Wisin y Yandel, Gilberto Santa Rosa and Kany García. On March 22, 2011, he performed alongside the Dominican-American urban bachata artist Prince Royce in the Casandra Awards.

His debut album, Melodrama, incorporated bachata rhythms with stylistic influences of other genres from around the world, such as bolero. For his second album A La Mar, García began collaborating with Calle 13 producer Visitante. The collaboration inspired García to deviate from mainstream bachata and incorporate a variety of genres into the album: the artist recalled, "I [didn't] want to be that guy that just does Caribbean music". García won three awards including Best New Artist at the 2017 Latin Grammy Awards. The song "Bachata en Kingston" from A La Mar won Best Tropical Song at the ceremony. A La Mar was ranked by the Los Angeles Times as the best album of the decade by any Dominican artist.

=== 2018–present: Trending Tropics side project and Candela ===
García continued his collaboration with Visitante on the experimental 2018 album Trending Tropics, which received critical acclaim. The pair experimented with a wide variety of musical genres on the record, ranging from "hip-hop to reggae, from merengue to disco, from choral music to fuzzy African rock". The lyrical content on Trending Topics was inspired by the complex relationship between humans and technology and features collaborations with Vetusta Morla, iLe, Ana Tijoux, Nidia Góngora.

His 2019 release Candela was heavily influenced by merengue, a genre García called "the most important rhythm of the Dominican Republic". Seeking inspiration, García went to a state-owned music library to listen to preserved merengue phonographs. Through his studies, the singer learned about the diversity of merengue, including Haitian merengue derived from Angolan music. García hoped that by incorporating these styles on the record, he would demonstrate a "universalist perspective" through his music. At the 2019 Latin Grammy Awards Candela was nominated for Best Contemporary Tropical Album while the song "Ahí Ahí" was nominated for Record of the Year.

== Discography ==
- Melodrama (2010)
- A La Mar (2016)
- Candela (2019)
- Desde Otro Malecón (2023)
- Puñito de Yocahú (2025)

=== Singles ===
- "Cómo Has Logrado"
- "Mi Balcón" (featuring Cultura Profética)
- "Te soñé"
- "Amar en el Yuna"
- "Carmesí"
- "Dulcito e Coco"
- "Caramelo"
- "Loma de Cayenas" (featuring Juan Luis Guerra)

== Awards and nominations ==
=== Latin Grammy Awards ===
A Latin Grammy Award is an accolade by the Latin Academy of Recording Arts & Sciences to recognize outstanding achievements in the music industry. Vicente García has achieved three wins among five nominations.

Year	Category	Nominated work	Result	Ref.
2017	Best New Artist	Himself	Won	
2017	Album of the Year	A la mar	Nominated	
2017	Best Singer-Songwriter Album	A la mar	Won	
2017	Best Tropical Song	"Bachata en Kingston"	Won	
2019	Record of the Year	"Ahí Ahí"	Nominated	
2019	Best Contemporary Tropical Album	Candela	Nominated	
2023	Best Folk Album	Camino Al Sol	Won	
2024	Song of the Year	"A Fuego Lento" Ft. Daymé Arocena	Nominated	
