= Abaroa =

Abaroa or Avaroa may refer to:

== People ==
- Eduardo Abaroa (1838–1879), also spelled Avaroa, a Bolivian hero of the War of the Pacific
- Gabriel Abaroa, the first president of the Latin Academy of Recording Arts & Sciences (LARAS)
- Ronald MacLean Abaroa, a Bolivian politician and leading international expert in anti-corruption programs

== Places ==
- Eduardo Avaroa province, Oruro department, Bolivia
- Eduardo Avaroa Andean Fauna National Reserve in Sur Lípez province, Potosí department, Bolivia
