= After School =

After School may refer to:

== Film and television ==
- After School (1972 film), a Chinese animated short film
- After School (2003 film), a Singaporean film
- After School, a 2023 film directed by Lan Cheng-lung
- Afterschool, a 2009 film directed by Antonio Campos
- After School (TV series), a New Zealand children's television series (1981–1988)

== Music ==
- After School (group), a South Korean girl group
- "After School", a 1957 song by Randy Starr
- "After School", a song by LL Cool J from his 2002 album 10
- "After School", a song from the 1990 album Trio, featuring Donald Bailey, Red Mitchell, and Jimmy Rowles
- "After School", a song by Young MC from the 1991 album Brainstorm
- "After School", a song by Dom Kennedy from the 2013 album Get Home Safely
- After School (EP), a 2020 extended play by Melanie Martinez
- "After School" (song), a 2020 song by Korean girl group Weeekly from We Play
- After School (album), an album by Miho Nakayama

== Other uses ==
- After-school activity, special activities that are done at the school after the day is over
- After school special, a type of television program
- After School (app), a social network mobile application for teenagers
