= Silvina Moreno =

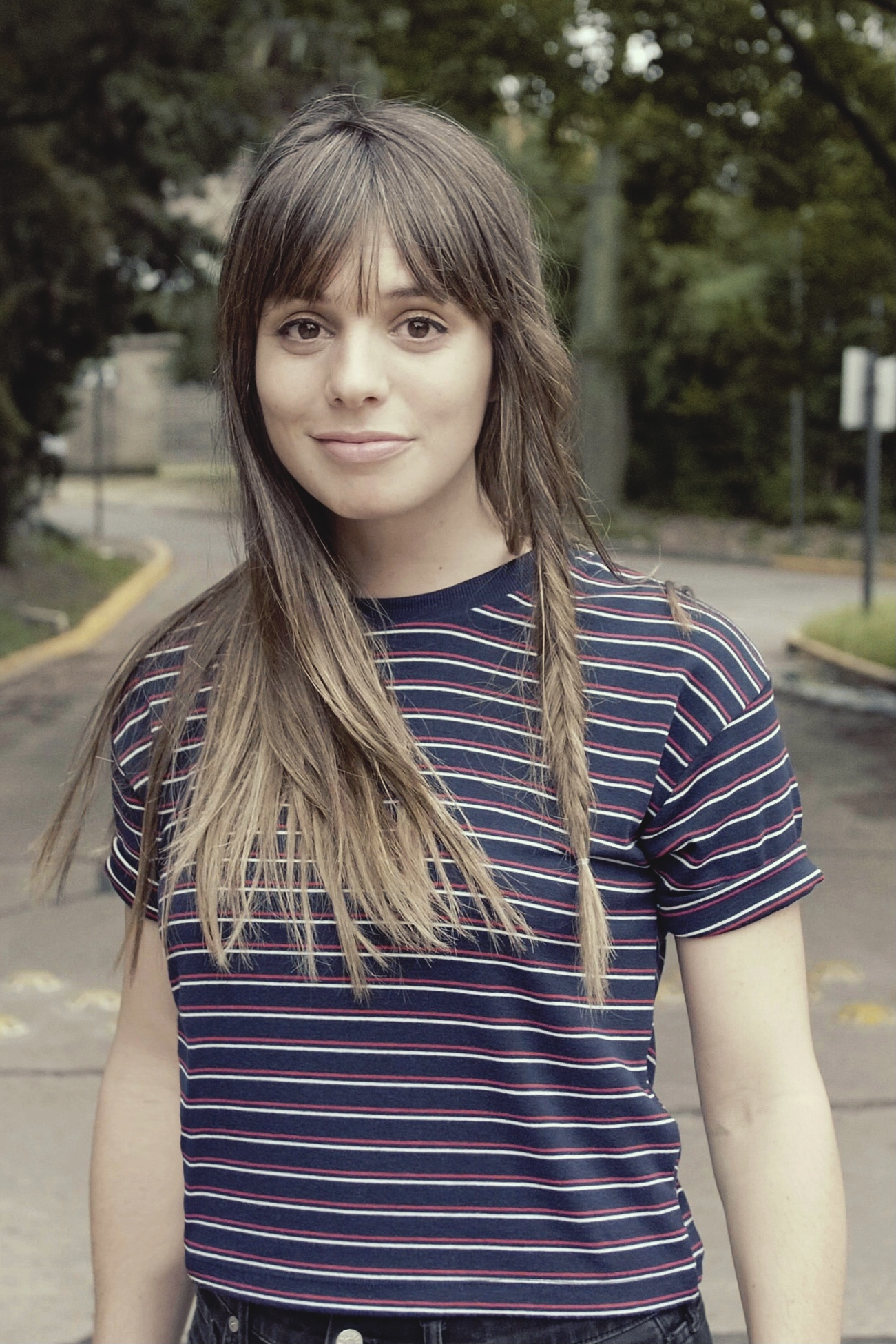
- Silvina Moreno in 2018

Background information
- Born: September 8, 1987 (age 38); Buenos Aires, Argentina
- Origin: Berklee College of Music
- Genres: Pop; Rock; Indie; Jazz
- Occupations: Singer and songwriter
- Instruments: Vocals, guitar
- Years active: 2011–present
- Labels: Sony Music Argentina
- Website: www.silvinamoreno.com

Silvina Moreno (born September 8, 1987) is an Argentine singer, instrumentalist and composer. Her career includes five albums, she has had three nominations for the Gardel Awards and she is currently an artist for the record label Sony Music Argentina.

== Biography ==
Moreno received her college education at Berklee, where she appeared in high-profile concerts. She was subsequently chosen to perform at three graduation ceremonies at the Agganis Arena in Boston, in front of renowned artists such as Juan Luis Guerra, Smokey Robinson, Angelique Kidjo, Michael McDonald, Paco De Lucía and Chucho Valdés.

During the aforementioned years she formed her roots in Brooklyn and London, resulting in an artistic combination with her South American roots. In this way she began to venture into an experimental genre that included variants of North American and English indie pop/rock (Ingrid Michaelson, Florence + The Machine, Sia, Lily Allen, Kate Nash, St. Vincent) and Latin American singer-songwriters (Jorge Drexler, Kevin Johansen, Gustavo Cerati).

Her music is characterized by telling and defending narrative stories with a marked focus on the song and composition itself.

She shared the stage with Jorge Drexler, Natalia Lafourcade, Ximena Sarinana, Carlos Rivera and Paty Cantu. In addition, she opened for notable artists such as Ed Sheeran, Alicia Keys, Gilberto Gil and Harry Styles. Lastly, she shared the stage with Oscar-winning singer-songwriter Jorge Drexler and sang alongside ten-time Grammy Award winner Bobby McFerrin.

== Musical career ==
After graduating from higher education, she decided to work on her professional career, releasing her debut album titled "Mañana", which was released in 2011 as an independent production. It was recorded in New York City and was produced by her and the indie recording engineer Jeff Fettig. In the reissue Alejandro Pont Lezica was in charge of the integral artistic production. It has 10 original compositions that reveal her musical imagination. Through this album Moreno had the opportunity to open concerts for different figures such as Gilberto Gil, Coti, Estelares y Alicia Keys.

Her second album, titled "Real", was recorded simultaneously in studios in Buenos Aires and New York City, and mastered in London, and was released in 2015. It contains fifteen songs of his own authorship that were musically co-produced by Nicolás Guerrieri and the duo Alfredo Toth and Pablo Guyot.

On 3 March 2017, she released the single "Frío En los Pies" with Kevin Johansen. This single was the first preview of her third album, "Sofá." The latter features twelve songs of her own authorship and was produced by Eduardo Cabra of Calle 13. The song "Cuídame," which is part of the aforementioned album, would become one of the author's best-known works, surpassing twenty million views on digital platforms.

In 2019 she released her fourth album titled "Herminia" with works alongside Nico Cotton and Juan Pablo Vega.

In 2022 she released her fifth album entitled "Selva" and presented it for the first time in an emblematic space on Avenida Corrientes, the appointment was at the Broadway Theater. She was also part of the Concert with Refugees for Telefe and ACNUR.

== Discography ==
- Mañana (2012)
- Real (2015)
- Sofá (2017)
- Herminia (2019)
- Selva (2022)

== Awards and nominations ==
Year	Awards	Category	Album	Result
2013	Gardel Awards	Best New Pop Artist Album	Mañana	Nominated
2018	Gardel Awards	Best Pop Female Artist Album	Sofá	Nominated
2019	Fans Choice Awards	Breakthrough Artist	Sofá	Nominated
2020	Gardel Awards	Best Songwriter Album	Herminia	Nominated
