= Manuel Abud =

Mexican-American media executive

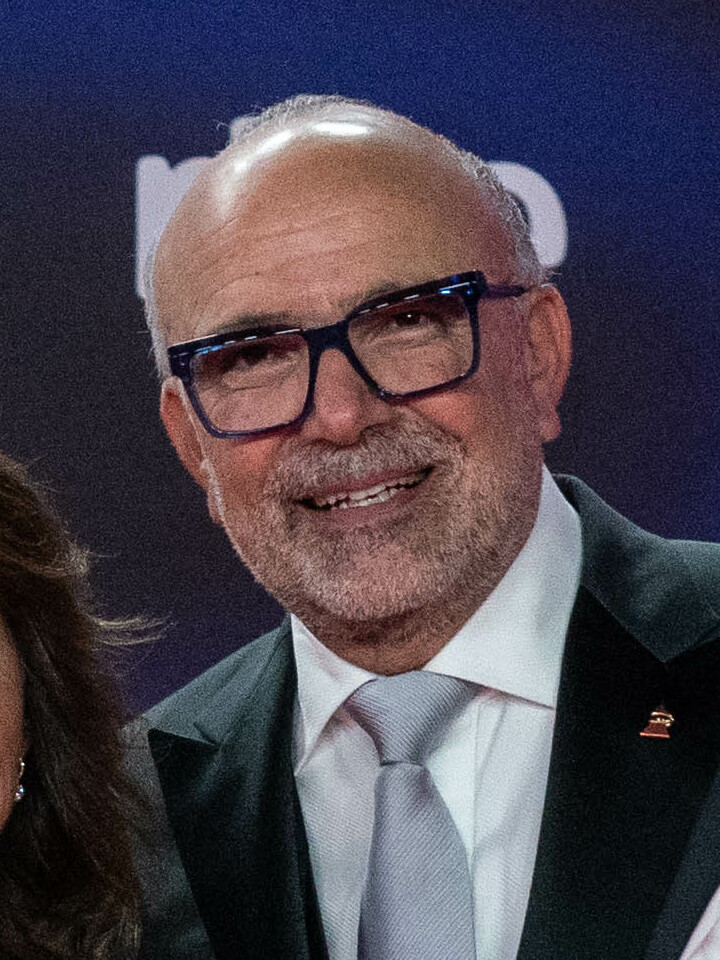
- Abud in 2023
- Born: 1966 (age 59–60); Mexico City, Mexico
- Citizenship: Mexico; United States
- Education: Instituto Tecnológico Autónomo de México (Lic.); Houston Baptist University (MBA)
- Occupation: Business executive
- Title: CEO of The Latin Recording Academy

Manuel Abud (born 1966) is a Mexican and American business and entertainment executive. He is currently CEO of The Latin Recording Academy. Abud was born in Mexico City and earned an MBA in 1991. He has held leadership roles in media and entertainment companies serving Spanish-speaking and multicultural audiences in the United States and Latin America.

== Early life and education ==
Abud was born in Mexico City. He received a bachelor's degree in accounting from the Instituto Tecnológico Autónomo de México (ITAM) in 1986 and an MBA from Houston Baptist University in Texas in 1991.

== Career ==
=== 1997–1999: Early career: Televisa and CBS Telenoticias ===
Abud began his career at Grupo Televisa, where he served as director of investor relations and was involved in the company's initial public offering and listing on the New York Stock Exchange. He later became the chief financial officer of Grupo Medcom, overseeing more than 50 corporations and the operations of a television station in Guadalajara.

From 1999 to 2000, Abud was president of CBS Telenoticias. He relaunched the network as Telemundo Internacional, shifting its format from all-news to a mix of news and entertainment.

=== 2000–2012: NBCUniversal and Telemundo ===
Abud joined NBCUniversal in 2000 and held several executive positions over 14 years. He was president of Telemundo Cable, overseeing networks like Telemundo Internacional. Abud served as general manager of television stations KVEA and KWHY in Los Angeles and KXTX-TV in Dallas. In 2001, he founded the bilingual cable network Mun2 (now NBC Universo), targeting young Hispanic audiences. In 2012, Abud was named president of the Telemundo Station Group, where he was credited with increasing local news programming and community engagement initiatives.

=== 2012–2017: Azteca América ===
Abud was appointed president and CEO of Azteca América in March 2014. During his tenure, he reorganized the network, expanded its programming to include more soccer and original productions, and oversaw the creation of a digital content studio, Azteca GlassWorks. In November 2017, he led the network's acquisition by HC2 Holdings, Inc.

=== 2019–present: The Latin Recording Academy ===
Abud joined to the Latin Recording Academy as its COO in 2019. In this role, he led a reorganization of the organization and focused on digital content development. He succeeded Gabriel Abaroa as CEO in August 2021. As CEO, Abud has focused on strengthening the organization's membership, increasing its international presence through events in Mexico, Brazil, and Spain, and evolving its digital strategy. He has stated that his goal is to ensure the academy is an inclusive and representative institution for the Latin music community.

== Board memberships ==
Abud serves on the Board of Councilors at the USC Annenberg School for Communication and Journalism. He has previously served on the boards of the Texas Association of Broadcasters, Junior Achievement of Dallas, the YWCA Foundation of Fort Worth, and the Ronald McDonald House of Southern California.

== Personal life ==
Abud resides in Miami, Florida.

== See also ==
- National Academy of Recording Arts & Sciences
- Harvey Mason Jr.

Cultural offices
Preceded by Gabriel Abaroa	President of The Latin Recording Academy; 2021–present	Incumbent
