= Latin Grammy Awards =

American award for achievements in music in Spanish and Portuguese

Latin Grammy Award
- Current: 27th Annual Latin Grammy Awards; November 12, 2026
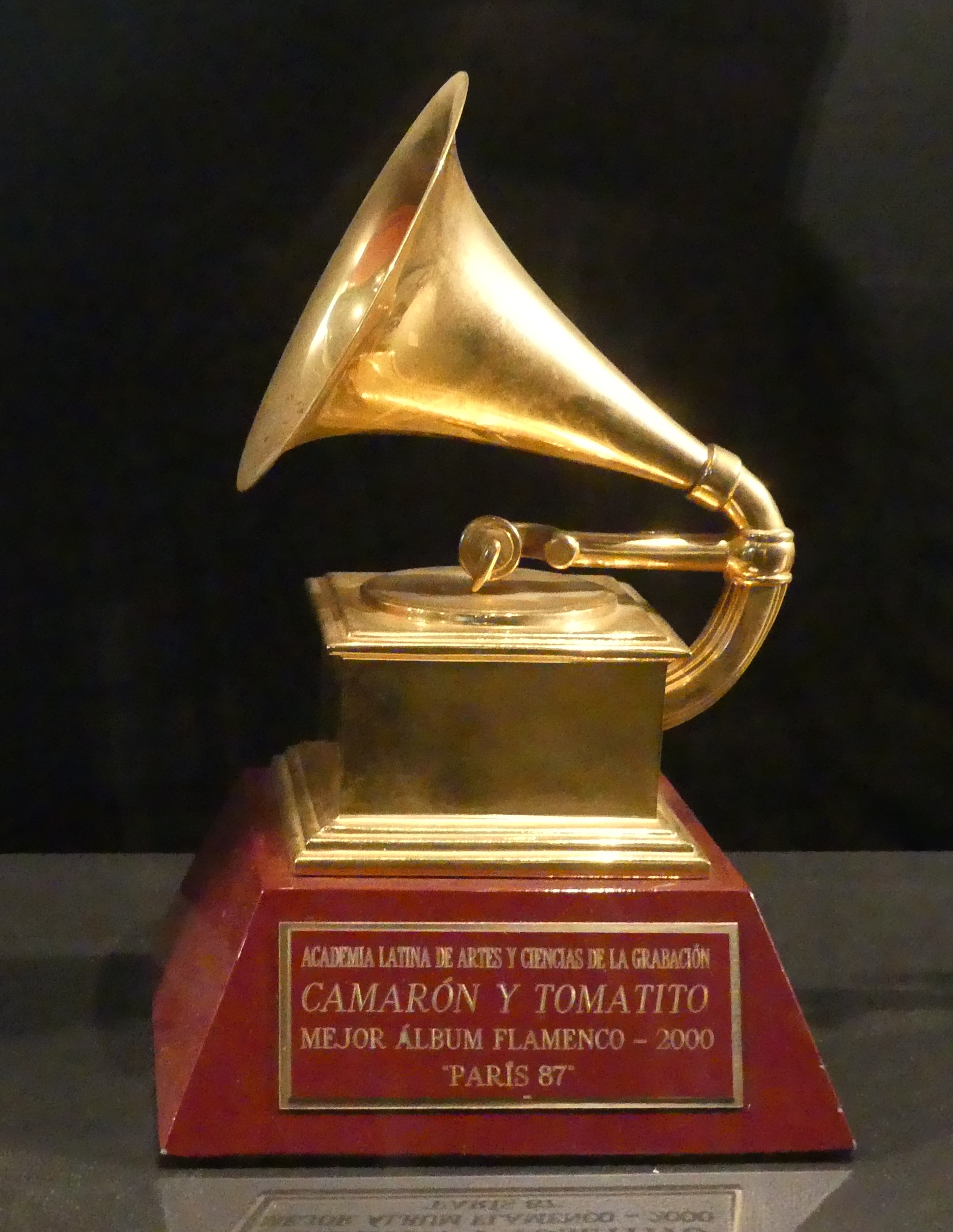
- The 2000 Best Flamenco Album trophy
- Awarded for: Outstanding achievements in the Latin music industry, primarily for works recorded in either Spanish or Portuguese
- Country: United States
- Presented by: The Latin Recording Academy
- First award: September 13, 2000; 26 years ago
- Website: latingrammy.com (in Spanish, English, and Portuguese)

Television/radio coverage
- Network: CBS (2000–2004); Univision (2005–present)

Most recent Latin Grammy Award winners
- Best in 2025–26
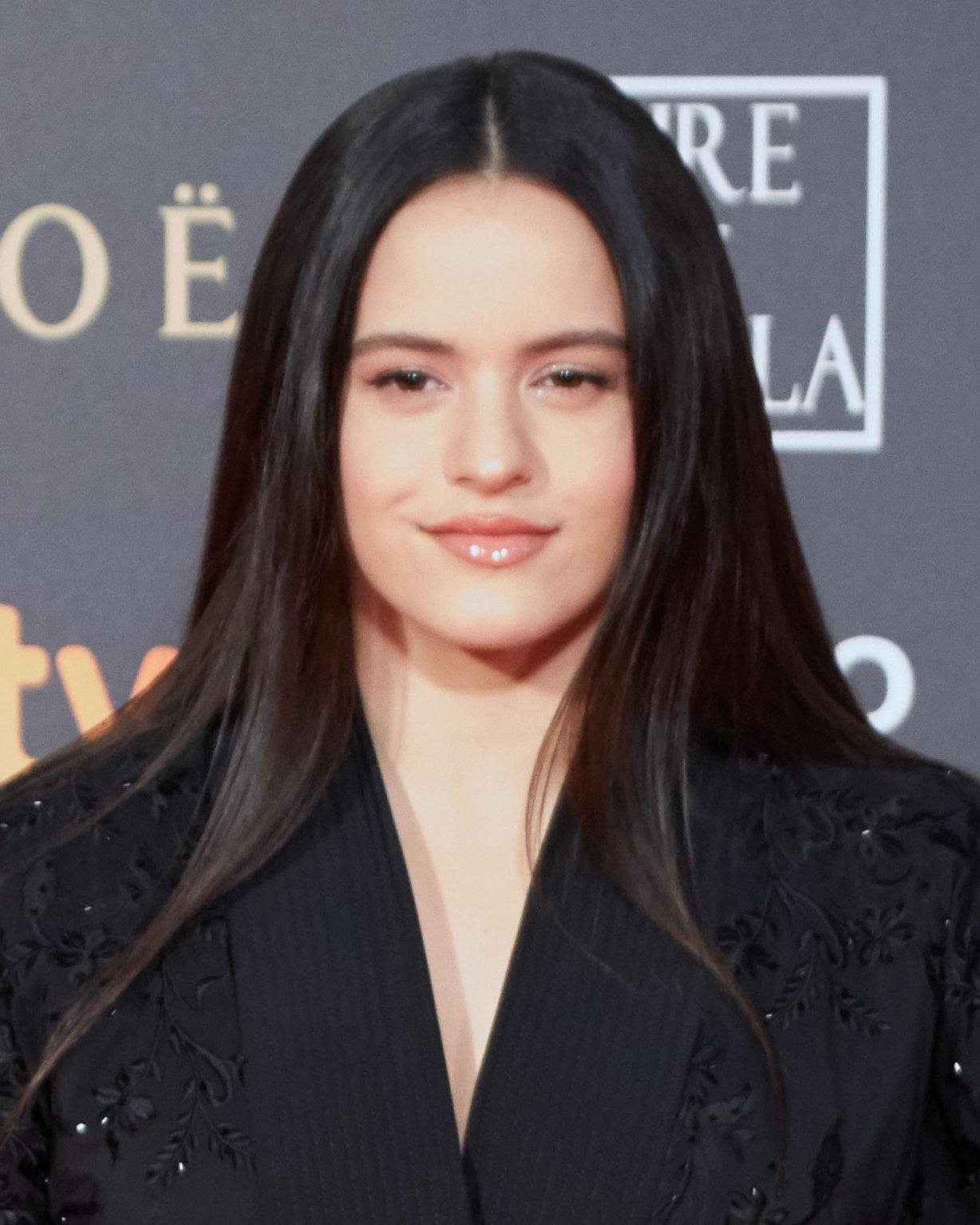

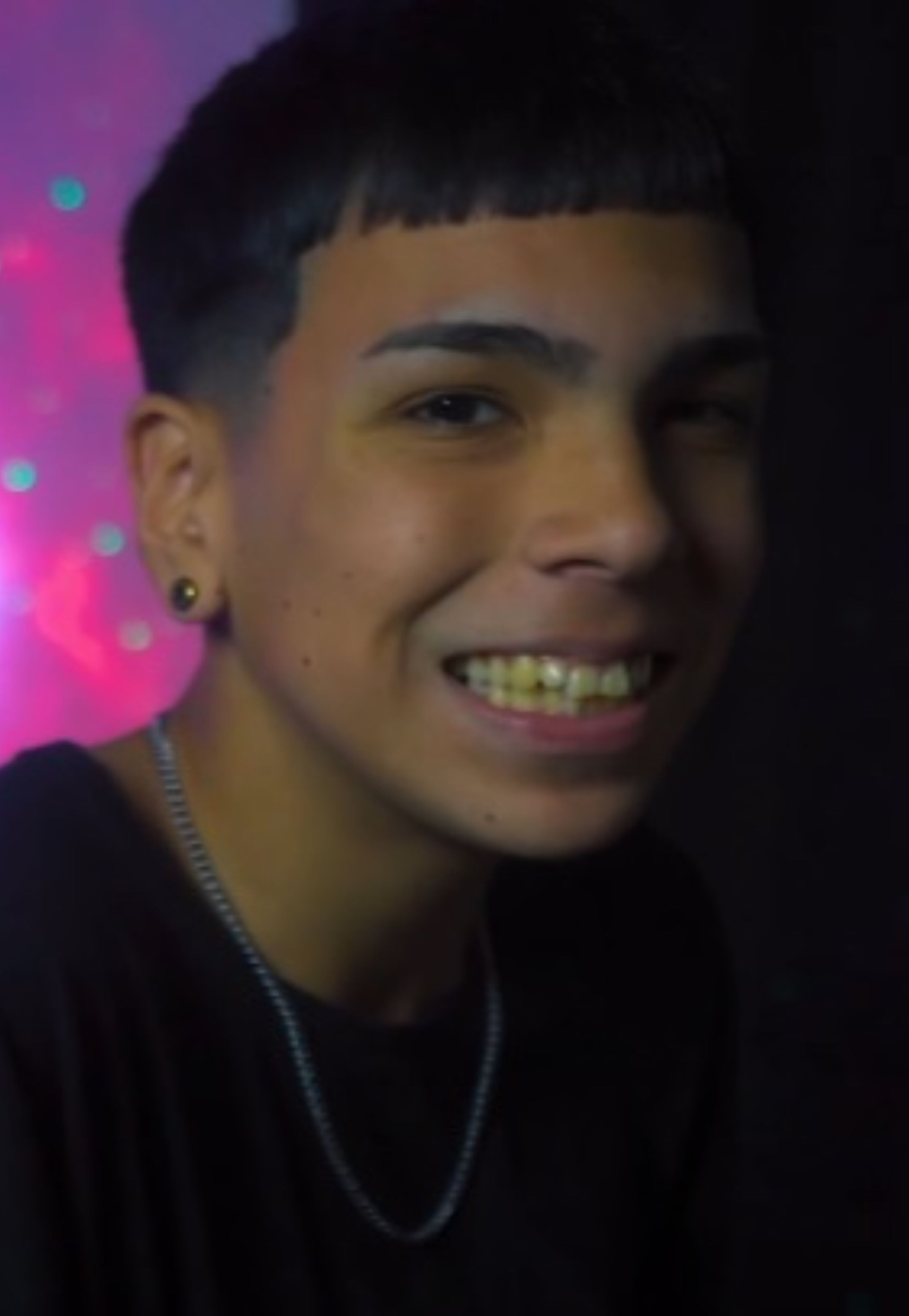

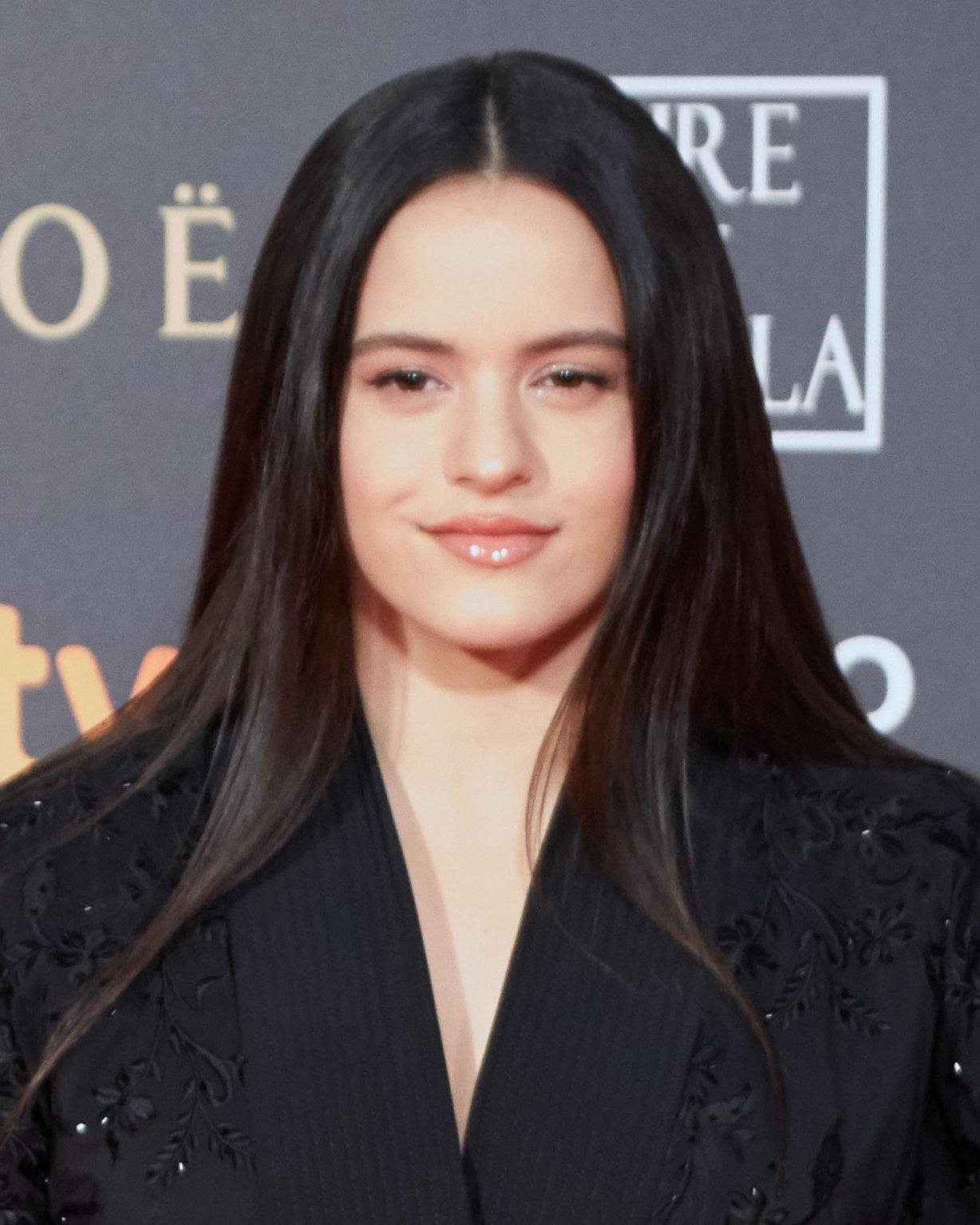

Award	Album of the Year	Record of the Year
Winner	Rosalía (Lux (Complete Works))	Milo J ("Niño")
Award	Song of the Year	Best New Artist
Winner	Rosalía ("La Perla")	Aria Vega
Previous Album of the Year
Debí Tirar Más Fotos
Album of the Year
Lux (Complete Works)

The Latin Grammy Awards, stylized as the Latin GRAMMYs, are honors presented by the Latin Recording Academy to recognize excellence in the Latin music industry. The awards celebrate outstanding achievements in recordings released anywhere in the world, provided they are tied to Ibero-America—a region defined by the Academy as including Latin America, Spain, Portugal, and the Latino communities in the United States and Canada—and are primarily performed in Spanish or Portuguese.

Additionally, recordings in other Ibero-American languages or dialects, such as Catalan, Basque, Galician, Valencian, Mayan, Guarani, Nahuatl, or Quechua, may be deemed eligible by a majority vote. Similar to the Grammy Awards, winners are selected through a peer-review process by Academy members.

The inaugural ceremony was held on September 13, 2000, at the Staples Center in Los Angeles. Its broadcast on CBS was a landmark event, as it served as the first prime-time program on U.S. television to be broadcast primarily in Spanish by an English-language network. Since 2005, the official U.S. broadcast has been handled by Univision, where the awards have solidified their position as one of the network's highest-rated events. For instance, the 2013 ceremony drew 9.8 million viewers, making Univision one of the three most-watched networks in the country that evening.

The 27th edition was on November 12, 2026, at the MGM Grand Garden Arena in Las Vegas.

== History ==
The Latin Academy of Recording Arts & Sciences, doing business as the Latin Recording Academy, was formed by the National Academy of Recording Arts & Sciences (dba the Recording Academy) in 1997. It was founded by Michael Greene and Producers & Songwriters Rudy Pérez & Mauricio Abaroa. Rudy Pérez was the Grammy Florida chapter's first President of the Board. The concept of a separate Grammy Awards for Latin music began in 1989. According to organizers, the Latin Grammy Awards was established as the Latin music universe was deemed too large to fit on the Grammy Awards. The Latin Recording Academy defines Latin music as music in Spanish or Portuguese regardless of an artist's origin.

The Latin Grammy Awards mainly encompasses music released in Latin America, Spain, Portugal and the Latino United States. In 2000, it was announced that the 1st Annual Latin Grammy Awards would take place at the Staples Center on September 13, 2000. On July 7, 2000, the nominations were announced in Miami, Florida, United States. The Latin Grammys were introduced with over 39 categories included limited to Spanish and Portuguese-speaking recordings. The first telecast took place at the Staples Center and was broadcast. The following year's show was canceled due to the September 11, 2001 attacks, which was the same day the show was to take place. In 2002, the academy elected its first independent board of trustees. In 2005, the broadcast was moved from CBS to Univision where the whole telecast was in Spanish.

Voting members live in various regions in the US and outside of the US including Latin America and Iberia. For a recording to be eligible for a nomination, it must have at least 60% (previously 51% until 2024) of its content recorded in Spanish or Portuguese and commercially released in North America, Central America, South America, the Caribbean, Spain, or Portugal. Products recorded in languages and dialects from Ibero-America such as Catalan, Basque, Galician, Valencian, Nahuatl, Guarani, Quechua or Mayan may be accepted by majority vote of the committees of the Latin Recording Academy. According to the organization's bylaws, it can also include recognized dialects from countries where Portuguese is an official language as well as music in French or Italian if "specific music categories are created or approved by the Board of Trustees". The Latin Recording Academy also accepts Latin instrumental music from Ibero-America as well as compositions that have been composed or interpreted by an Iberian American musician. The eligibility period is June 1 to May 30 for a respective awards ceremony. Recordings are first entered and then reviewed to determine the awards they are eligible for. Following that, nominating ballots are mailed to voting members of the academy. The votes are tabulated and the five recordings in each category with the most votes become the nominees. Final voting ballots are sent out to voting members and the winners are determined. Winners are later announced at the Latin Grammy Awards. The current President & CEO of the Latin Academy of Recording Arts & Sciences is Manuel Abud, who succeeded Gabriel Abaroa in 2021.

Altogether there are four events: the Lifetime Achievement and Trustees when renowned artists are honored for lifetime achievement; the Leading Ladies of Entertainment event presented to women for their work in the Latin entertainment industry; Person of the Year, when one artist is honored at a gala dinner, and Grammy itself, an award that brings together artists from all over Latin America and Iberia and that today is broadcast live to 80 countries, including Brazil, by channel Univision (TNT in Brazil).

== Awards ==
=== Award categories ===
Similar to the Grammys, four award categories recognize the broad range of Latin music regardless of genre:

- Record of the Year is awarded to the performer and the production team of a single song.
- Album of the Year is awarded to the performer and the production team of a full album.
- Song of the Year is awarded to the writer(s)/composer(s) of a single song.
- Best New Artist is awarded to an artist without reference to a song or album.

The remainder of the categories are genre-specific. Special non-competitive awards are also given out for more long-lasting contributions to the Latin music industry.

== Ceremonies and venues ==
#	Year	Album of the Year	Record of the Year	Song of the Year	Best New Artist	Most wins	Most nominations	Ref.
1	2000	Luis Miguel; Amarte Es Un Placer	Santana; Maná "Corazón Espinado"	Marc Anthony "Dímelo"	Ibrahim Ferrer	Luis Miguel; Santana; Maná (3)	Marc Anthony; Shakira; Fito Páez (5)	
2	2001	Alejandro Sanz; El Alma Al Aire	Alejandro Sanz "El Alma Al Aire"		Juanes	Alejandro Sanz (4)	Juanes (7)	
3	2002	Alejandro Sanz; MTV Unplugged	Alejandro Sanz "Y Solo Se Me Ocurre Amarte"		Jorge Moreno	Alejandro Sanz (3)	Carlos Vives (6)	
4	2003	Juanes; Un Día Normal	Juanes "Es Por Ti"		David Bisbal	Juanes (5)	Juanes (5)	
5	2004	Alejandro Sanz; No Es Lo Mismo	Alejandro Sanz "No Es Lo Mismo"		María Rita	Alejandro Sanz (4)	Alejandro Sanz (4)	
6	2005	Ivan Lins; Cantando Histórias	Alejandro Sanz "Tú No Tienes Alma"		Bebe	Juanes (3)	Bebe (5)	
7	2006	Shakira; Fijación Oral, Vol. 1	Shakira; Alejandro Sanz "La Tortura"		Calle 13	Shakira (4)	Shakira (5)	
8	2007	Juan Luis Guerra; La Llave De Mi Corazón	Juan Luis Guerra "La Llave De Mi Corazón"		Jesse & Joy	Juan Luis Guerra (5)	Juan Luis Guerra (5)	
9	2008	Juanes; La Vida... Es Un Ratico	Juanes "Me Enamora"		Kany García	Juanes (5)	Juanes; Café Tacuba; Julieta Venegas (5)	
10	2009	Calle 13; Los de Atrás Vienen Conmigo	Calle 13; Café Tacuba "No Hay Nadie Como Tú"	Luis Fonsi; Aleks Syntek; Noel Schajris; David Bisbal "Aquí Estoy Yo"	Alexander Acha	Calle 13 (5)	Calle 13 (5)	
11	2010	Juan Luis Guerra; A Son de Guerra	Camila "Mientes"		Alex Cuba	Camila; Juan Luis Guerra (3)	Juan Luis Guerra; Jorge Drexler; Alejandro Sanz (4)	
12	2011	Calle 13; Entren Los Que Quieran	Calle 13 "Latinoamérica"		Sie7e	Calle 13 (9)	Calle 13 (9)	
13	2012	Juanes; MTV Unplugged	Jesse & Joy "¡Corre!"		3BallMTY	Jesse & Joy (4)	Juan Luis Guerra (6)	
14	2013	Draco Rosa; Vida	Marc Anthony "Vivir Mi Vida"	Carlos Vives "Volví A Nacer"	Gaby Moreno	Carlos Vives; Sergio George (3)	Carlos Vives; Illya Kuryaki and the Valderramas; Javier Garza (5)	
15	2014	Paco de Lucía; Canción Andaluza	Jorge Drexler; Ana Tijoux "Universos Paralelos"	Enrique Iglesias; Descemer Bueno; Gente de Zona "Bailando"	Mariana Vega	Enrique Iglesias; Descemer Bueno; Gente de Zona (3)	Eduardo Cabra (10)	
16	2015	Juan Luis Guerra; Todo Tiene Su Hora	Natalia Lafourcade "Hasta La Raíz"		Monsieur Periné	Natalia Lafourcade (4)	Leonel García (6)	
17	2016	Juan Gabriel; Los Dúo, Vol. 2	Carlos Vives; Shakira "La Bicicleta"		Manuel Medrano	Juan Gabriel; Carlos Vives; Shakira; Manuel Medrano; Yandel; Los Fabulosos Cadillacs; Illya Kuryaki and the Valderramas; Fonseca (2)	Djavan; Fonseca; Jesse & Joy (4)	
18	2017	Rubén Blades; Salsa Big Band	Luis Fonsi; Daddy Yankee "Despacito"		Vicente García	Luis Fonsi; Daddy Yankee (4)	Residente (9)	
19	2018	Luis Miguel ¡México Por Siempre!	Jorge Drexler "Telefonía"		Karol G	Jorge Drexler (3)	J Balvin (8)	
20	2019	Rosalía; El Mal Querer	Alejandro Sanz; Camila Cabello "Mi Persona Favorita"	Pedro Capó "Calma"	Nella	Rosalía; Alejandro Sanz El Guincho (3)	Alejandro Sanz (8)	
21	2020	Natalia Lafourcade; Un Canto por México, Vol. 1	Alejandro Sanz "Contigo"	Residente "René"	Mike Bahía	Rosalía; Natalia Lafourcade; Carlos Vives (3)	J Balvin (13)	
22	2021	Rubén Blades; Roberto Delgado & Orquesta; SALSWING!	Caetano Veloso; Tom Veloso "Talvez"	Yotuel; Gente De Zona; Descemer Bueno; Maykel Osorbo; El Funky "Patria y Vida"	Juliana Velásquez	Camilo (4)	Camilo (10)	
23	2022	Rosalía; Motomami (Digital Album)	Jorge Drexler & C. Tangana "Tocarte"		Angela Alvarez; Silvana Estrada	Jorge Drexler (6)	Bad Bunny (10)	
24	2023	Karol G Mañana Será Bonito	Natalia Lafourcade "De Todas las Flores"	Bizarrap & Shakira; Shakira: Bzrp Music Sessions, Vol. 53	Joaquina	Karol G Shakira; Bizarrap; Natalia Lafourcade; Edgar Barrera; Santiago Alvarado (3)	Edgar Barrera (13)	
25	2024	Juan Luis Guerra 4.40; Radio Güira	Juan Luis Guerra 4.40 "Mambo 23"	Jorge Drexler "Derrumbe"	Ela Taubert	Juan Luis Guerra (4)	Edgar Barrera (9)	
26	2025	Bad Bunny; Debí Tirar Más Fotos	Alejandro Sanz "Palmeras en el Jardín"	Karol G "Si Antes Te Hubiera Conocido"	Paloma Morphy	Bad Bunny; Ca7riel & Paco Amoroso (5)	Bad Bunny (12)	
27	2026	Rosalía LUX (Complete Works)	Milo J "Niño"	Rosalía "La Perla"	Aria Vega	Rosalía (5)	Edgar Barrera (10)	

=== Venues ===
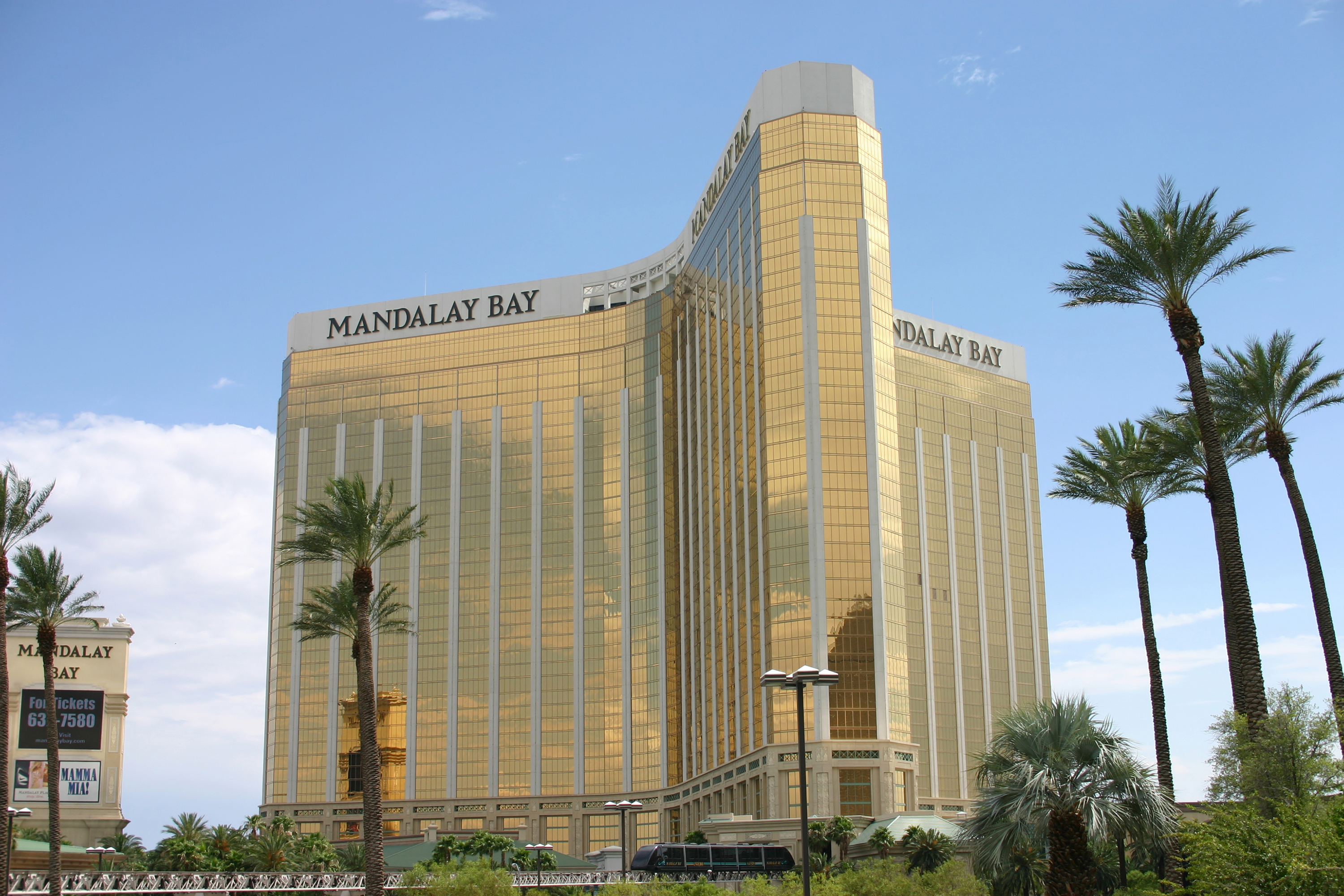
The Latin Grammy Awards have been held seven times at the Michelob Ultra Arena in Las Vegas, which is part of the Mandalay Bay Resort & Casino

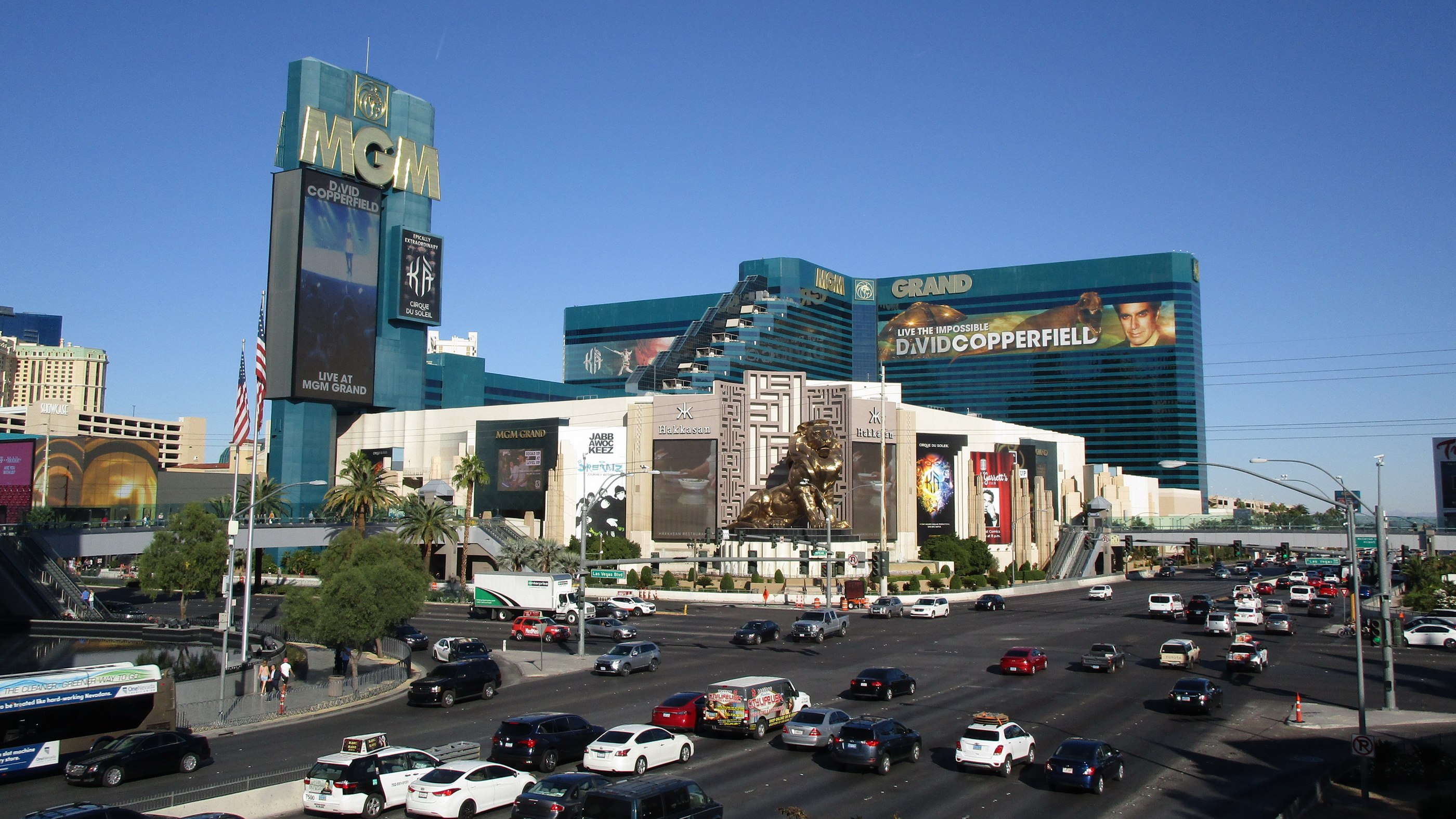
The MGM Grand Garden Arena at the MGM Grand Las Vegas will host its seventh Latin Grammy telecast in 2025

The Latin Grammy Awards are held in Las Vegas the most. The ceremony has been held there 14 times. The ceremony spent its first few years being held in Los Angeles and in 2003 took place in Miami. The ceremony had also been held once in New York City and Houston. In Las Vegas the ceremony has been held at three different venues over the years; the Michelob Ultra Arena, the MGM Grand Garden Arena and the T-Mobile Arena. The Michelob Ultra Arena has hosted the show seven times.

The 24th Annual Latin Grammy Awards were held on November 16, 2023, at the FIBES Conference and Exhibition Centre in Seville, Spain, which marked the first time the awards were held outside of the United States.

== Leading winners ==
With 31 Latin Grammy Awards, Edgar Barrera has won the most Latin Grammy Awards, followed by Residente who has won 29 wins. Natalia Lafourcade is the biggest winner among female artists with 20 awards. Calle 13, with 22 Latin Grammy Awards, holds the record for most awards won by a group.

== TV broadcasts and ratings ==
Year	Network	Viewers (millions)	Reach (millions)	Source
2000	CBS	7.5		
2001	—N/a (Note: The 2001 event was cancelled in response on the September 11 attacks that took place earlier in the day.)			
2002	CBS	3.9		
2003	CBS	4.9		
2004	CBS	3.3		
2005	Univision	5.1		
2006	Univision	5.7		
2007	Univision	6.2		
2008	Univision	5.8	11	
2009	Univision		12.8	
2010	Univision	6.2	12.5	
2011	Univision	5.7	11.1	
2012	Univision	5.0	11	
2013	Univision	4.6	9.8	
2014	Univision	4.8	9.9	
2015	Univision	4.0	9.0	
2016	Univision	3.2	9.0	
2017	Univision	2.7	8.0	
2018	Univision	2.68	7.0	
2019	Univision	3.44	8.0	
2020	Univision	2.1	5.7	
2021	Univision	2.3	5.9	
2022	Univision	2.5	5.3	
2023	Univision	2.5	18.9	
2024	Univision	1.9	4.2	
2025	Univision	1.8		

== Criticism ==
As with its Grammy Awards counterpart, the Latin Grammy Awards has also received criticism from various recording artists and music journalists.

Upon the announcement of the Latin Grammy Awards in 1999, several musical journalists raised concerns about the awards being used as a marketing tool by the mainstream media. Manny S. Gonzalez of the Vista En L.A felt that the award would just be used to advertise artists being promoted by Emilio Estefan. The lack of categories for non Spanish and Portuguese-speaking music has been criticized, namely by artists who consider their work to be "Latin" in sound or origin but are not eligible for a Latin Grammy including those from Haiti (who have compared their compas music to merengue music from the Dominican Republic but is sung in French Creole) and Celtic musicians from the Galicia and Asturias regions of Spain. In 2026, the Haitian compas was recognized under the category of Best Contemporary Tropical Album, although the linguistic requirement still requires least 60% lyrics in Spanish or languages/dialects of Hispanic America for that category. The linguistic requirement has also been criticized by Tony Succar whose album, Unity: The Latin Tribute to Michael Jackson, was not eligible for a Latin Grammy Award despite the album being recorded in salsa music. In response to the criticism, a spokesman for the Latin Recording Academy stated: "The Latin Recording Academy considers music based on the contents of the recording itself – the technical elements that go into the art of music making – not based on how a recording or an artist is marketed externally." In 2001, Cuban exiles living in Miami protested at the Latin Grammy Awards for allowing musicians living in Cuba to perform at the stage. This resulted in the Latin Grammys being moved to Los Angeles for the second annual awards (which would in the end be canceled in the aftermath of the September 11 attacks).

In October 2010, a year in which he did not have any new works eligible for the 11th Annual Latin Grammy Awards, Venezuelan singer-songwriter Franco De Vita – a previous nominee – called the Latin Grammys "fake and a lie" and stated that if he were to ever win an award, he would not accept it. The following year, he won his first two Latin Grammy Awards, at the 12th Annual Latin Grammy Awards. American musician Willie Colón observed the relationship between the Latin Grammys and major Latin record labels. Mexican singer-songwriter Aleks Syntek noted that Mexican artists in general were apathetic towards the awards. The Latin Grammys was met with backlash at the 2019 awards ceremony when none of the urbano artists were nominated in the general categories despite its popularity. This led to several reggaeton artists, including Daddy Yankee and J Balvin, boycotting the event. The Latin Recording Academy responded to criticism by requesting the "leaders of the urban community to get involved with the Academy, to get involved with the process, and to get involved with discussions that improve the Academy." Since the late 2010s, the inclusion of Spain in the awards has garnered controversy from social media users who noted the Spanish colonization of the Americas. Abud has responded to criticism on the inclusion of Spain by pointing out that "Latin music has been defined by Spanish and Portuguese".

== See also ==
- List of Grammy Award categories
