= Calor Urbano =

Dominican music band

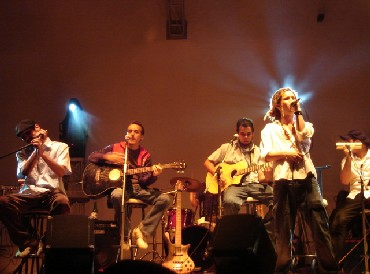
Calor Urbano in concert

Calor Urbano was a band from the Santo Domingo, Dominican Republic that was formed in late 2002 when its members decided to make a mixture of the different musical styles that influenced them as artists. The band members consisted of Vicente García leading on vocals and writing, Adolfo Guerrero as their M.C./backup vocals, Joel Berrido as their bassist and Carlos Chapuseaux as their guitarist, they fused their influences with soul, funk, disco, hip-hop, neo-soul, Nu-Jazz to create their unique and modern musical style.

After months of work early on the band, initially with little more than a dozen songs, produced what later became their first single, "Calor Urbano", recorded with the production and engineering of Mike Rodríguez and José Bordas, recognized producers who have worked with well-known musicians and groups of the Dominican Republic. The single was sent to national radio stations in 2003. It quickly became a hit, reaching the top of music charts and receiving good reviews by recognized members of the local music scene within the country.

In the first quarter of 2003, Calor Urbano began a process of organization and restructuring the band to a more mature form. Then, towards the end of the same year the band released the second promotional single, "Vertigo", and in mid-2004 they took over listings with their third single, "To Soul", placing Calor Urbano among the top bands of the Dominican Republic by releasing three consecutive singles in one year, all of which became very popular. The same year, they were nominated as best pop/rock band of the year in the Premios del Pueblo awards.

By 2005, the group had signed their first record deal with Azares Entertainment, a Dominican record company, and released their first official album, Transmission Groove, in the summer of 2006. The bands final lineup consisted of Vicente García as lead vocalist, Adolfo Guerrero as M.C./backup vocals, Joel Berrido on the bass guitar and Carlos Chapuseaux playing lead guitars, as well as many other musicians for live performances.

In the following years, they performed as one of the opening acts for major tours with Ricky Martin and Juan Luis Guerra also touring in the United States in cities like Miami and beyond.

By August 2010 an announcement was made that lead vocalist and leader of the group Vicente García was moving onto become a solo artist.
