= Wireless Latin Entertainment =

Wireless Latin Entertainment (WILAEN) is a United States producer and distributor of Latin digital entertainment content formed in 2001. The WILAEN distribution network has a presence in eight countries: Argentina, Brazil, Colombia, Dominican Republic, Guatemala, Mexico, Peru, and the U.S.

Through its brand, Latin Garage, WILAEN produces and distributes digital services and content, such as mastertones, ringbacks, polyphonic ringtones, video ringers, images and wallpapers, and full-track downloads.
