= Candela (album) =

Studio album by Vicente García
- Released: May 24, 2019
- Genres: Bachata, merengue, pop
- Length: 44:03

Vicente García chronology
A La Mar (2016)	Candela (2019)

Candela is the third studio album by Dominican musician Vicente García, released on May 24, 2019.

== Background and composition ==
Candela was heavily influenced by merengue, a genre García called “the most important rhythm of the Dominican Republic". Seeking inspiration, García went to a state-owned music library to listen to preserved merengue phonographs. Through his studies, the singer learned about the diversity of merengue, including Haitian merengue derived from Angolan music. García hoped that by incorporating these styles on the record, he would demonstrate a "universalist perspective" through his music.

== Reception ==
At the 2019 Latin Grammy Awards Candela was nominated for Best Contemporary Tropical Album while the song "Ahí Ahí" was nominated for Record of the Year.

Also Candela was nominated for Best Tropical Latin Album on the 62nd Annual Grammy Awards.

== Track listing ==
No.	Title	Writer(s)	Length
1.	"Guatú"	García	1:48
2.	"Candela"	García	3:28
3.	"El Reperpero"	García	3:26
4.	"La Tambora"	García	2:53
5.	"Detrás del Horizonte"	García	3:24
6.	"Murió Con Flores"	García	0:37
7.	"Ahí Ahí"	García	3:31
8.	"Merengue De Enramada"	García	3:29
9.	"Lo Que Más Extrañas"	García	3:29
10.	"Un Conuco y Una Flor"	García	4:04
11.	"Loma de Cayenas (Feat. Juan Luis Guerra)"	García, Guerra	3:48
12.	"Palm Beach"	García	3:05
13.	"San Bá"	García	3:14
14.	"Magüá"	García	2:57
15.	"Contracanto"	García	1:44
