= Diana Fuentes =

American journalist (1958–2026)

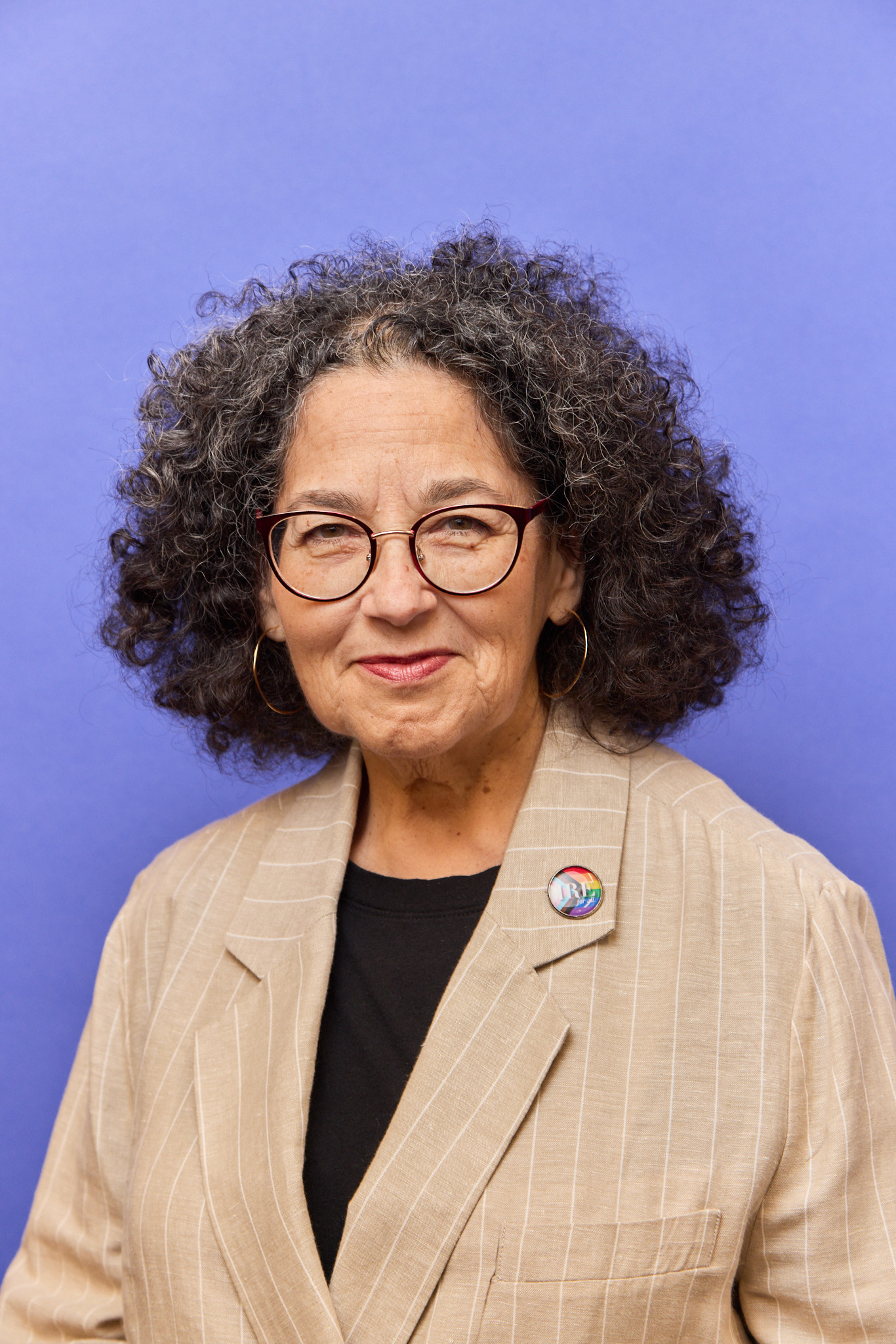
- Born: September 27, 1958
- Died: March 20, 2026
- Education: Texas State University
- Occupations: Executive director, managing editor, deputy editor, board member, president, professor
- Employers: Freedom of Information Foundation of Texas; Investigative Reporters and Editors; Laredo Morning Times; San Antonio Express-News; Texas State University; University of Missouri

Diana R. "DeeDee" Fuentes (September 27, 1958 – March 20, 2026) was an American journalist, editor, and press freedom advocate with more than 35 years of experience in journalism, reporting on stories across Mexico and the United States. She was widely recognized as a champion of investigative reporting, diversity in newsrooms, and freedom of information. In 2021, she became the first person of color to serve as executive director of Investigative Reporters and Editors (IRE), a nonprofit organization dedicated to training journalists in investigative techniques.

== Early life and education ==
Fuentes was born on September 27, 1958, in Corpus Christi, Texas, and grew up as the oldest of five children in Laredo, Texas. She had two brothers, Jaime and Marco, and two sisters, Lydia and Sylvia. Fuentes attended Nixon High School in Laredo, where she was an honor roll student and participated in the debate team, student council, and the school newspaper. She began her journalism studies at Laredo Junior College, where she was noted as a passionate and outspoken student. She earned a Bachelor of Journalism from the University of Texas at Austin and later completed a master's degree at Texas State University.

== Career ==
=== Early career in Texas newsrooms ===
Fuentes spent the early part of her career as a reporter and editor in South Texas and San Antonio. She served as editor of the Laredo Morning Times for seven years and as editor and publisher of the Del Rio News Herald. She also served as managing editor of the Beaumont Enterprise.

She later joined the San Antonio Express-News, where she worked as a reporter and rose to serve as deputy metro editor, a position from which she retired in 2021. During her time in San Antonio, she was a founding figure in the San Antonio Association of Hispanic Journalists (SAAHJ).

=== Investigative Reporters and Editors ===
In April 2021, Fuentes was appointed executive director of Investigative Reporters and Editors, becoming the first person of color to hold that position. In her role, she led the organization through major milestones including the COVID-19 pandemic and IRE's 50th anniversary, while working to expand access to investigative journalism training for reporters across the country.

=== Academia ===
Fuentes taught journalism at the University of Missouri–Columbia and Texas State University, helping to train future reporters and editors.

== Advocacy ==
Throughout her career, Fuentes was a fierce advocate for freedom of the press, transparency, and accountability in public institutions. She was a former president of Texas Managing Editors, active in the Texas Press Association and the Freedom of Information Foundation of Texas, and was a longtime member and leader within the National Association of Hispanic Journalists (NAHJ), which inducted her into its Hall of Fame in 2022. She also participated in the Society of Professional Journalists San Antonio Pro chapter, where she helped organize the annual Gridiron show, a satirical fundraiser supporting journalism scholarships, and the annual Texas Managing Editors/Headliners Excellence in Journalism Contest.

== Awards and honors ==
The IRE Board of Directors voted to nominate Fuentes posthumously for induction into the IRE Ring of Honor, established in 2022 to recognize members who have made significant contributions to the organization. A fundraising campaign was established in her name to support journalism fellowships, training, and resources for the next generation of investigative journalists.

== Personal life ==
Fuentes met her husband, Raymond A. Gomez, Jr., during her career at the Laredo Morning Times. The couple married in 1993 and remained together with their cat, Phoenix, until Gomez's death by pneumonia in 2009.

== Death and legacy ==
Fuentes died on March 20, 2026, in Washington, D.C., where she was attending a Freedom of Information conference during Sunshine Week. She sustained an accidental head injury from a fall while visiting a friend and died from her injuries. An autopsy by the District of Columbia Office of the Chief Medical Examiner confirmed the cause of death as a blunt force injury to the head due to a fall. She was 67 years old.

Following her death, tributes poured in from across the journalism community. The National Association of Hispanic Journalists described her passing as "a deeply personal and significant loss to the journalism profession" and called her "a trailblazer who leaves a great legacy." The San Antonio Association of Hispanic Journalists remembered her as "a giant in our industry."
