= Gabriel Abaroa =

Mexican music executive and attorney

Gabriel Abaroa Jr.
- Born: Mexico City, Mexico
- Occupations: Former president and CEO of the Latin Recording Academy, music executive, attorney

Gabriel Abaroa Jr. is a Mexican entertainment executive and attorney, best known for his role as the president and CEO of the Latin Recording Academy (LARAS), which presents the Latin Grammy Awards, from 2003 to 2021. Under his nearly two-decade leadership, the Latin Recording Academy experienced significant growth, including the establishment of the Latin Grammy Cultural Foundation, where he served as founding president, and the transition of the Latin Grammy telecast from English to Spanish. After stepping down in August 2021, he was named president emeritus of the academy, a non-full-time paid position.

== Early life and education ==
Coming from a very musical family, Abaroa grew up in an environment deeply rooted in music. His father transformed their family home in Mexico City by removing walls between two rooms to create a small home auditorium. "Passing bands in Mexico would stop by, whom my father invited to perform so his friends could pay to see them," recalls Abaroa. "Most of these musicians were so dedicated to art that they forgot to charge even though they had nothing to live on." At the age of 15, Gabriel began to play the drums and sing, starting his professional musical career in 1976.

He later pursued legal studies at two prestigious universities in Mexico. The combination of law with his passion for music paved the way for his career. He co-founded the Special Annual Seminar on Music Entertainment Business at Anahuac University, where he taught entertainment law for five consecutive years.

== Career ==
=== Early career ===
Abaroa created Legal Corp, a firm providing legal services to most multinational record labels based in Mexico and to major artists. In 1994, he moved to Miami to cover the Latin American market and worked alongside the Recording Industry Association of America (RIAA) to support the growing Latin music industry.

In 2000, along with a group of visionaries, he founded Wireless Latin Entertainment, the first U.S.-based Latin content producer, focusing on developing ringtones for the untapped U.S. wireless market.

=== The Latin Recording Academy ===
Motivated by his brother Mauricio, who was the founding vice president of the Latin Recording Academy, Abaroa began his association with the organization as the vice-chairman of its board of trustees. In March 2003, he was appointed president of the academy, and in August 2010, he was promoted to president and CEO.

Under Abaroa's leadership, the Latin Recording Academy experienced significant growth, becoming a respected international entity with exceptional financial stability and strong credibility. He led the establishment of the Latin Grammy Cultural Foundation in 2014, serving as its founding president. By 2020, the foundation had allocated over $6.5 million toward scholarships, grants, musical instrument donations, and educational events in the United States and Ibero-America.

In 2018, Abaroa led the negotiating team to secure an unprecedented multi-million-dollar agreement extending the partnership with Univision, the largest U.S. Hispanic network, through 2028, with multi-platform coverage of the Latin Grammy Awards.

He was instrumental in transitioning the Latin Grammy Awards telecast from English to Spanish, broadening its appeal to Spanish-speaking audiences worldwide. In recognition of his influence in the industry, he was listed among Billboard's Latin Power Players in 2016.

After nearly 20 years at the helm, Abaroa stepped down from his role in August 2021 and was named president emeritus of the academy.

== Other activities ==
Abaroa has been involved with various organizations throughout his career. He has been a member of the Rock & Roll Hall of Fame, the National Council of La Raza, the Miami Symphony Orchestra, the USO's Entertainment Committee, the Mexican Entrepreneur Association (AEM), and the task force to create Spanish-language categories for the Daytime Emmy Awards.

He currently serves on the boards of the National Association of Latino Arts and Cultures (NALAC) and MusiCares. Since 2014, Abaroa has been an international judge for the Platino Awards, which honor excellence in Ibero-American cinema. Additionally, he has been a permanent member of the Grammy Awards' TV Committee for the past 15 years and is a voting member of both the Grammy and Latin Grammy Awards.

== See also ==
- Latin Academy of Recording Arts & Sciences
- Latin Grammy Awards

Cultural offices
Preceded by Mauricio Abaroa	President of The Latin Recording Academy; 2003–2021
