= After School (app) =

Social network mobile application for teenagers

- Type: Anonymous social network
- Discontinued: Yes, service is offline
- Final version: 1.99.94 (iOS) / February 18, 2019
- Operating systems: Android, iOS

After School was a proprietary iOS and Android, social network mobile application that allows users in a defined network, aimed at high schools, to share anonymous text-based posts and images with others. As of July 2016, After School had users at more than 20,000 American high schools.

According to CEO Michael Callahan, the app was created as a network “that teens could use to express themselves, to reach out to others and to ask for and offer help to fellow teens in distress.”

The app, created by Michael Callahan and Cory Levy of ONE, Inc., debuted in mid-November 2014. In the re-release of the app in April 2015, After School implemented “mature content” filters, age verification, 24/7 live anonymous support, and FIRST (Fastest Internet Response System for Threats). In February 2016, After School announced raising a $16.4 million Series A round. The app also detects threatening or harmful messages using "language algorithms" and "enforces a single-report immediate user removal for violations."

While the service has not been formally discontinued, the website is offline and the applications are no longer available for download in the Google Play Store and Apple App Store as of 2020. It is now part of the Utah operation of Ancestry.com.

== Criticism ==
The service has received criticism for enabling cyberbullying due to its anonymous nature and intended audience, as well as not being accessible by parents or teachers.

== Cofounders & acquisition ==
Core team
Michael Callahan	Romain Declé-Nancy	Cory Levy

The company's staff was acquired by Ancestry.com LLC in 2021. Ancestry.com
