= The Latin Recording Academy =

American Latin music organization

- The Latin Academy Of Recording Arts & Sciences, Inc.
- Academia Latina de la Grabación (Spanish); Academia Latina da Gravação (Portuguese)
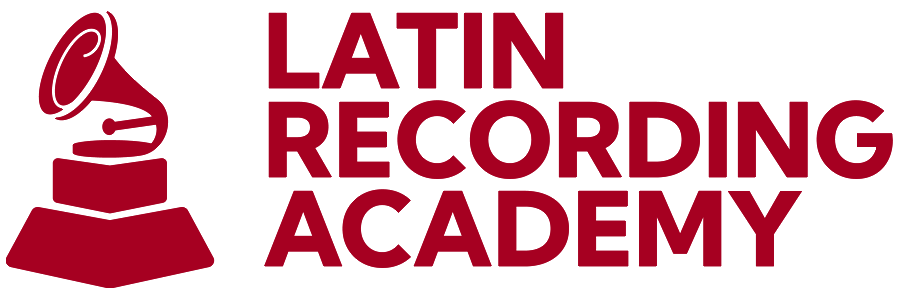
- Latin Recording Academy Logo
- Abbreviation: LARAS
- Formation: 1997; 29 years ago
- Type: Music organization
- Legal status: 501(c)(3)
- Headquarters: Miami, Florida, U.S.
- Official language: English; Portuguese; Spanish
- Key people: Manuel Abud (President & CEO)
- Affiliations: The Recording Academy
- Website: www.latingrammy.com (in Spanish, English, and Portuguese)

The Latin Academy of Recording Arts & Sciences, Inc. (LARAS), doing business as the Latin Recording Academy (Spanish: Academia Latina de la Grabación; Portuguese: Academia Latina da Gravação), is a multinational membership-based association composed of Latin music industry professionals, musicians, producers, recording engineers, and other creative and technical recording professionals. The Latin Recording Academy places greater emphasis on aesthetic and technical accomplishments than on sales or chart positions. They aim to provide a broader platform and raise the profile of Latino artists and creators, both domestically and internationally.

They promote the genre and its makers, both inside and outside the United States. The Academy is internationally known for its annual Latin Grammy Awards. It is headquartered in Miami and is led by president and CEO Manuel Abud.

== Historical highlights ==
- 1997: The Recording Academy establishes the Latin Recording Academy as a Latin counterpart to expand its operation in Latin America and Spain.
- 2002: Elected its first independent Board of Trustees. Manolo Diaz (Chairman); Gabriel Abaroa (Vice-Chair), Raul Vazquez (Treasurer) and Tom Gomes (Secretary).
- 2003: Gabriel Abaroa is appointed president of the Latin Recording Academy.
- 2004: Internationally renowned recording artist Carlos Santana was honored as the Latin Recording Academy Person of The Year, recognizing his professional, cultural, and social accomplishments.
- 2014: Under the leadership of Gabriel Abaroa, the Latin Recording Academy established the Latin Grammy Cultural Foundation, aimed at furthering international awareness and appreciation of the significant contributions of Latin music and its makers to the world's culture through college scholarships, grants, and educational programs.
- 2018: The organization, under Gabriel Abaroa's leadership, secured an unprecedented multi-million-dollar agreement extending the partnership with Univision, the largest U.S. Hispanic network, through 2028, with multi-platform coverage of the Latin Grammy Awards.

== Organization ==
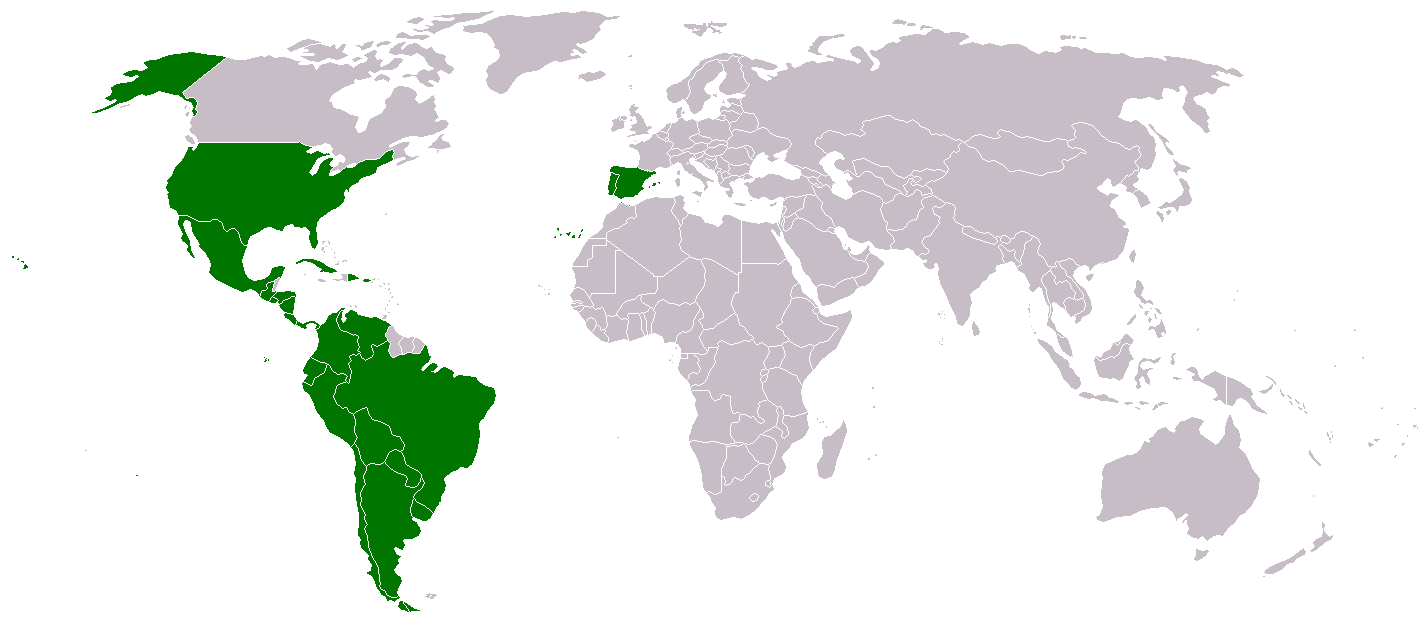
Map of where voting members of the Latin Recording Academy live

The Latin Recording Academy draws its membership from music professionals from Spanish- and Portuguese-speaking communities worldwide, namely Latin America, Iberia, and the United States. Through its efforts, the Latin Academy works to strengthen these communities through networking opportunities and educational outreach.

Under the nearly two-decade leadership of Gabriel Abaroa, the Latin Recording Academy experienced significant growth. He was instrumental in transitioning the Latin Grammy Awards telecast from English to Spanish, broadening its appeal to Spanish-speaking audiences worldwide.

The Latin Grammy Awards were the first prime-time English-, Spanish-, and Portuguese-language telecast on U.S. television. Members of the Latin Recording Academy are also eligible to vote for the categories in the Latin field of the Grammy Awards.

The Latin Recording Academy has produced educational outreach programs in Buenos Aires, Los Angeles, Mexico City, Santo Domingo, San Juan, Bogotá, São Paulo, and in the U.S. in Miami, Chicago, Los Angeles, Dallas, Houston, New York, and San Antonio. The Latin Academy has also produced the e-Latin GRAMMY Carreras Y Música events. These events provide educational outreach to more than 10,000 high school-age participants from at least 11 countries. The Latin Academy's programs provide interested students the opportunity, using interactive satellite technology, to discuss with musicians and members of the music industry what it is like to work in the business and what it takes to be successful in the field.

== Latin Grammys ==
The Latin Recording Academy is best known for its role in putting on the annual Latin Grammy Awards. The Latin Grammy Awards typically take place every November in Las Vegas, Nevada. The Latin Grammys have many awards to showcase artists that are involved in the music industry. Some of the main awards that fans focus on are "Album of the Year," "Record of the Year," "Song of the Year," and "Best New Artist."

The Latin Grammy Awards were originally broadcast by CBS and, after 2005, they switched to Univision, the largest U.S. Hispanic network. The Latin Grammy Week includes the Special Awards Tribute (Lifetime Achievement Awards and the Trustees Awards), the Person of the Year Gala, the Pre-Telecast simulcast event, the Latin Grammy Telecast ceremony, the Official After Party, and several other concerts aiming to promote the different genres of music. The Latin Grammy Awards have taken place in New York, Los Angeles, Las Vegas, Houston, Miami and Madrid. The Latin Grammy Week closes a cycle of music celebration formed by the Latin Grammy Street Parties (attended by 1.5 million people) and the Latin Grammy Intimate Concerts.
