= Vicente García =

Filipino priest

The Reverend Father Vicente García
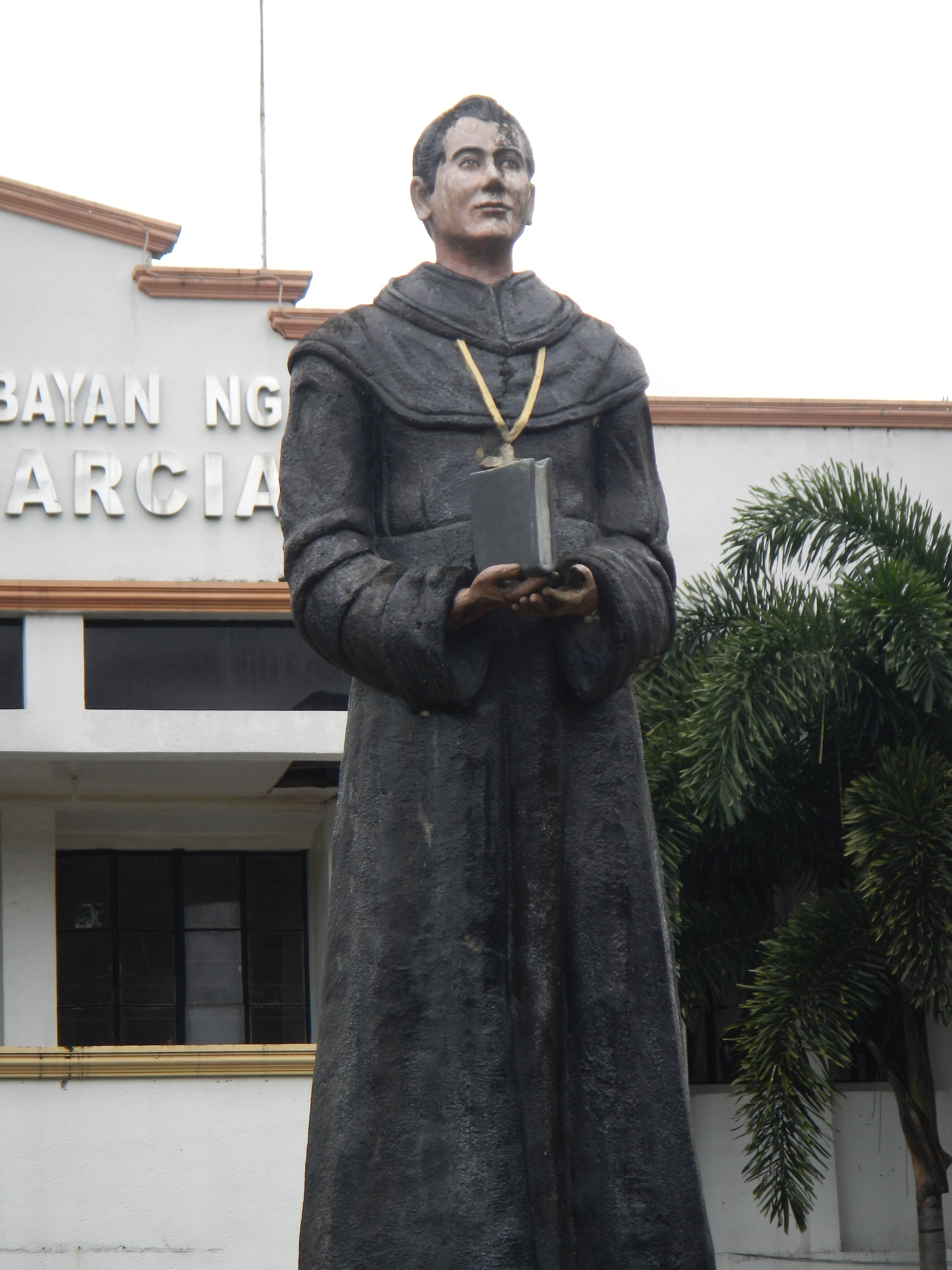
- Monument to García at the Padre Garcia Municipal Hall, Padre Garcia, Batangas

Personal details
- Born: Vicente García y Teodoro; April 5, 1817 Maugat, Rosario, Batangas, Captaincy General of the Philippines (now part of Padre Garcia, Batangas)
- Died: July 5, 1899 (aged 82) Rosario, Batangas, First Philippine Republic

Vicente García y Teodoro (Spanish: [biˈsente ɣaɾˈsi.a]; 1817–1899) was a Filipino priest, hero and a defender of Jose Rizal.

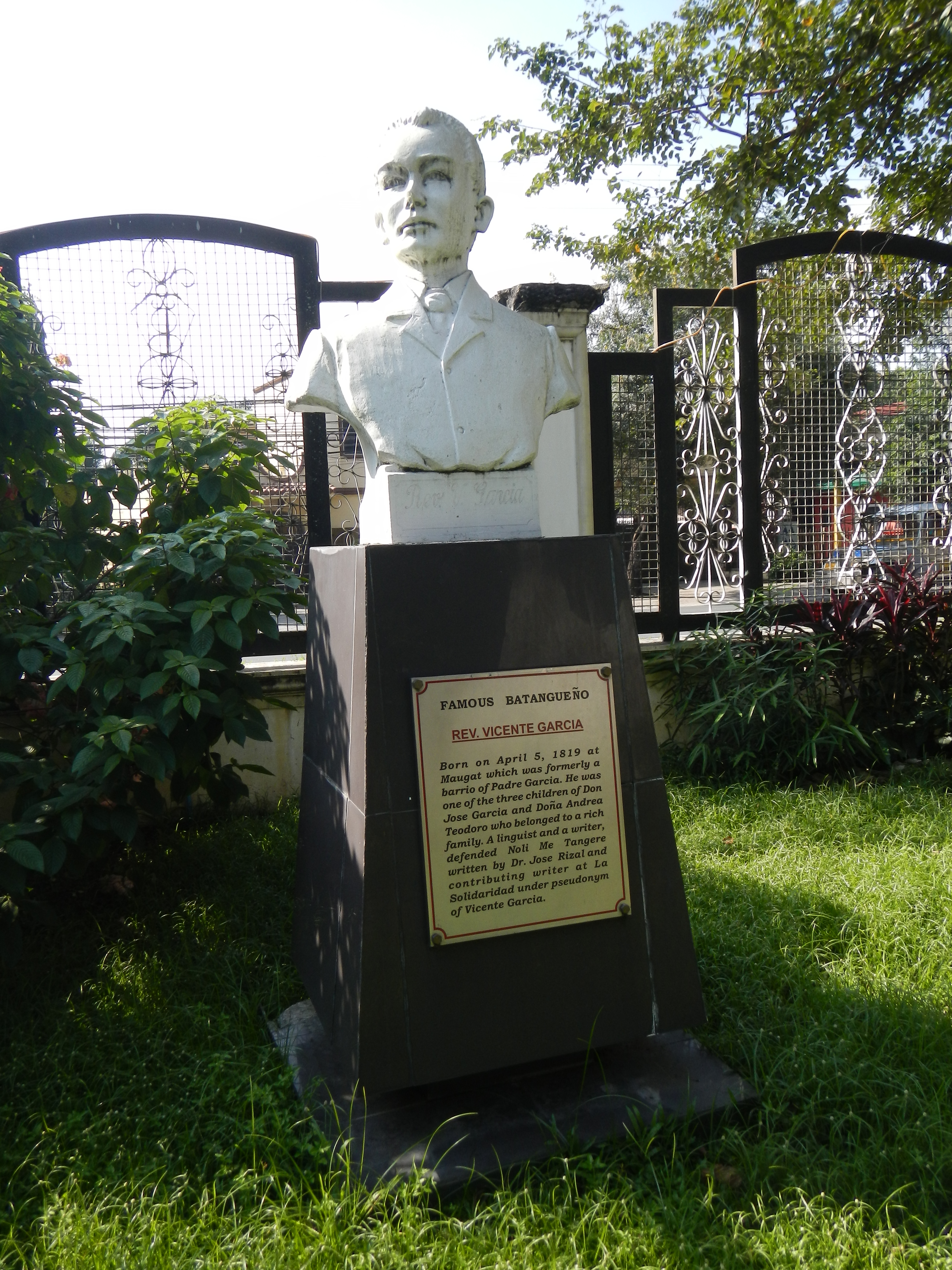
Vicente Garcia bust and plaque at the Historical Park

Garcia was born in the village of Maugat, formerly a part of Rosario and presently a barangay of Padre Garcia (a town named after him), on April 5, 1817, to parents Jose Garcia and Andrea Teodoro. His family belonged to the upper classes and had Castilian blood. The faint photograph of the man among the exhibits in the town hall show a handsome mestizo. Another proof was that Vicente went to study for the priesthood while pure-blooded Filipinos at that time were not able to study because of poverty and discrimination.

Garcia suffered discrimination from his Spanish superiors because although he was nominated for the position of Canonigo Magistral, he did not occupy it. The colonizers did not see fit to have an indio even if he is a mestizo in any exalted position.

There are anecdotes of his admirable qualities such as his kindness and generosity and his proficiency in Spanish and Latin. He was himself a writer who translated Spanish and Latin literary pieces. One of his more notable works was his translation from the original Latin to Tagalog of the Imitacion de Cristo.

Garcia's place in history comes not only from his admirable qualities as a human being. Although a member of the church, he had the courage to defend Rizal from the tirades and censure of the Catholic church. His letter of defense was originally intended to be given to José Rodriguez, an Augustinian friar who, in 1888, published a pamphlet entitled "¡CAIÑGAT CAYO! Sa Mañga Masasamang Libro,t, Casulatan (Beware Of Malevolent Books and Writings)". The publication is filled with scathing condemnation of Jose Rizal's writings. However, his friends dissuaded him from doing so. The letter was published in La Solidaridad on March 15, 1895.

In his defense-letter the priest belied Rodriguez's accusation that Rizal was an "impious man, a heretic who hated religion and Spain." According to Garcia, while the friar was quick to issue such accusations, he failed to cite any proposition made by Rizal that showed his "impiety, heresy, or blasphemy." Garcia then proceeded to cite various phrases in the Noli that showed the hero to be the exact opposite of the heretic and blasphemer that Rodriguez had accused him of being. He signed his name as V. Caraig.

Garcia came home to Rosario in 1899 and in July of that year he died at the age of 82. In determining whether the bones interred in the old cemetery were those of the priest, the historical committee sought the help of University of the Philippines professor and anthropologist Jerome Bailen and his team of experts. Bailen says that based on historical data and technical description the bones found in the old cemetery are those of Garcia.

On July 12, 1999, his remains were re-interred in the Most Holy Rosary Parish Church in the town proper of Padre Garcia (the old seat of the township of Rosario).

== Bibliography ==
- Rodriguez, José (1888). ¡CAIÑGAT CAYO! Sa Mañga Masasamang Libro,t, Casulatan (Beware Of Malevolent Books and Writings). Manila: Religioso sa Orden ni San Agustin (Religious Order of St. Augustine).
