= 25th Annual Latin Grammy Awards =

2024 edition of the Latin Grammy Awards

25th Latin Grammy Awards
- Date: November 14, 2024
- Venue: Kaseya Center; Miami; Florida, United States
- Hosted by: Roselyn Sánchez

Highlights
- Most wins: Juan Luis Guerra (4)
- Most nominations: Édgar Barrera (9)
- Person of the Year: Carlos Vives

Television/radio coverage
- Network: Univision; HBO Max
- Viewership: 4.2 million

The 25th Annual Latin Grammy Awards took place on November 14, 2024, at Kaseya Center in collaboration with Miami-Dade County and the Greater Miami Convention & Visitors Bureau (GMCVB). The awards honored recordings released between June 1, 2023, and May 31, 2024. It was the third time the ceremony takes place at Kaseya Center after 2003 and 2020. Puerto Rican actress Roselyn Sánchez hosted the ceremony.

Colombian singer and 18-time Latin Grammy winner Carlos Vives was honored as the Latin Recording Academy Person of the Year. Musicians and singers Albita, Lolita Flores, Alejandro Lerner, Los Ángeles Azules, Draco Rosa and Lulu Santos were honored with the Latin Grammy Lifetime Achievement Award. The nominations were announced via a virtual livestream on September 17, 2024, presented by Natalia Lafourcade, Luis Fonsi, Gilberto Gil, Juanes, Gente de Zona, Draco Rosa and Nathy Peluso. Mexican-American producer and songwriter Édgar Barrera led the nominations (for the second consecutive year) with nine, followed by Karol G and Bad Bunny, both with eight; Kevyn Mauricio Cruz with six, and Peso Pluma and Juan Luis Guerra with five.

== Performances ==
List of musical performances
Artist(s)	Song(s)
Premiere ceremony
Ale Acosta & Valeria Castro	"La Ceniza"
Vikina & Deorro	"BAMBOLE"
Alok	"Drum Machine" "Pedju Kunumigwe"
Kany García	"GARCÍA"
Rozalén; Leonel García	"Entonces" "Aún" "Altar"
Draco Rosa	"En Remolinos"
Simone Mendes	"Erro Gostoso"
Fonseca; Grupo Niche	"Con Dinero o Sin Dinero"
Jão	"Alinhamento Milenar"
Main ceremony
Carlos Vives	"Fruta Fresca" "La Bicicleta" "La Tierra del Olvido" "Volví a Nacer" "Robarte un Beso" "Pa' Mayte"
Ela Taubert; Joe Jonas	"¿Cómo Pasó?"
Eladio Carrión	"Mama's Boy"
Quevedo	"Columbia" "DURO"
Myke Towers	"LA FALDA" "Lala"
Juan Luis Guerra 4.40	"Mambo 23"
Danny Ocean	"Amor"
Álvaro Díaz	"QUIÉN TE QUIERE COMO EL NENE"
Trueno	"Tranky Funky"
Kali Uchis	"Te Mata"
Elena Rose	"Caracas en el 2000"
Emilia	"No Se Ve"
Leonel García; Reik; David Bisbal; Carlos Rivera; Alejandro Fernández	Tribute to Juan Gabriel, José José and Vicente Fernández "Hasta Que Te Conocí" "El Triste" "No Me Sé Rajar"
Tito Nieves; Christian Alicea; Grupo Niche; Luis Figueroa; Oscar D'León; Marc Anthony; La India	Salsa Tribute "De Mí Enamórate" "Una Aventura" "Tú Me Vuelves Loco" "Llorarás" "Vivir Lo Nuestro"
Carín León	"Despídase Bien"
Darumas	"Francotirador"
Edgar Barrera; Ángela Aguilar; Leonardo Aguilar; Becky G	"Por el Contrario"
Anitta; Tiago Iorc	"Mil Veces" "Mas que Nada"
Pitbull; Jon Bon Jovi	"Now or Never"
Grupo Frontera	"El Amor de Su Vida"
The Warning	"Qué Más Quieres"
Luis Fonsi	"No Me Doy por Vencido" "Despacito" "Santa Marta"

== Presenters ==
Premiere ceremony

- Maria Becerra, Juliana and Luísa Sonza (hosts)
- J Noa, Lauana Prado and Conociendo Rusia
- Gian Marco and Nicole Zignago
- Niña Pastori, Lila Downs and Soledad
- Mon Laferte and Gloria Groove
- DannyLux and Sofi Saar

Main ceremony

- Andy García, Gloria Estefan and Roselyn Sánchez – presented Best Contemporary Mexican Music Album
- DJ Khaled – introduced Eladio Carrión, Quevedo and Myke Towers
- Pepe Aguilar, Leonardo Aguilar and Ángela Aguilar – presented Best Traditional Pop Vocal Album and introduced Juan Luis Guerra 4.40
- Alejandro Sanz and Jon Bon Jovi – presented the Latin Recording Academy Person of the Year award to Carlos Vives
- Alejandro Sanz – presented Best Pop/Rock Album
- Mon Laferte and Julieta Venegas – presented Best Urban Music Album and introduced Carín León
- Chiquis – presented Best Pop Vocal Album and introduced Darumas
- Rauw Alejandro – presented Record of the Year
- Nathy Peluso and Goyo – introduced Grupo Frontera and presented Best New Artist
- Juanes – introduced The Warning and presented Song of the Year
- Carlos Vives – presented Album of the Year

== Winners and nominees ==
The nominations were announced on September 17, 2024. Winners appear first and highlighted in bold.

=== General Field ===
General Field
**Record of the Year**
- **"Mambo 23" – Juan Luis Guerra 4.40**
  - **Juan Luis Guerra & Janina Rosado, record producers; Allan Leschhorn, recording engineer; Allan Leschhorn, mixer; Adam Ayan, mastering engineer**
- "Mil Veces" – Anitta
  - Marcio Arantes, DJ Gabriel Do Borel & Julia Lewis, record producers; Denzel "Heartbreak" Richards, Jean Rodriguez & Pamela Velez, recording engineers; Eli Heisler & Rob Kinelski, mixers; Dave Kutch, mastering engineer
- "Monaco" – Bad Bunny
  - Argel, Smash David, Edsclusive, La Paciencia & Mag, record producers; Colin Leonard, recording engineer; Josh Gudwin, mixer; Bad Bunny, mastering engineer
- "Una Vida Pasada" – Camilo & Carín León
  - Camilo, record producer; Richard Bravo, Oscar Convers, Frank Fuentes, Nico González, Nicolás Ramírez & Daniel Uribe, recording engineers; Nico González & Nicolás Ramírez, mixers; Adam Ayan, mastering engineer
- "Catalina" – Cimafunk & Monsieur Periné
  - Fux Beat, record producer; Jose Manuel Morales Duluc, recording engineer; Jonathan Vergara, mixer; Bassy Bob Brockmann, mastering engineer
- "Derrumbe" – Jorge Drexler
  - Rafa Arcaute, Jorge Drexler & Federico Vindver, record producers; Rafa Arcaute, Lucas Piedracueva & Federico Vindver, recording engineers; Carlos Hernández Carbonell, mastering engineer
- "Con Dinero y Sin Dinero" – Fonseca & Grupo Niche
  - José Aguirre & Fonseca, record producers; José Aguirre, Carlos Bonilla & Germán Rodríguez, recording engineers; Carlos Alvarez, mixer; Mike Fuller, mastering engineer
- "Mi Ex Tenía Razón" – Karol G
  - Édgar Barrera & Mag, record producers; Na, recording engineer; MAG, mixer; Colin Leonard, mastering engineer
- "Tenochtitlán" – Mon Laferte
  - Manú Jalil & Mon Laferte, record producers; Isaí Araujo, Manú Jalil, Daniel Martinez & Pablo Rojas, recording engineers; Ignacio Sotelo, mixer; Chalo González, mastering engineer
- "Igual Que un Ángel" – Kali Uchis & Peso Pluma
  - Carter Lang, Jean Rodriguez, Kali Uchis & Dylan Wiggins, record producers; Luca Brown, Austen Jux-Chandler, Enrique Larreal & Jean Rodriguez, recording engineers; Neal Pogue, mixer; Mike Bozzi, mastering engineer
**Album of the Year**
- **Radio Güira – Juan Luis Guerra 4.40**
  - **Juan Luis Guerra & Janina Rosado, album producers; Allan Leschhorn, album recording engineer; Allan Leschhorn, album mixer; Juan Luis Guerra, songwriter; Adam Ayan, album mastering engineer**
- Bolero – Ángela Aguilar
  - Pepe Aguilar & Cheche Alara, album producers; Norberto Islas & Peter Mokran, album recording engineers; Peter Mokran, album mixer; Bernie Grundman, album mastering engineer
- cuatro – Camilo
  - Camilo, album producer; Oscar Convers, Frank Fuentes, Nico González, Natalia Ramírez, Nicolás Ramírez & Daniel Uribe, album recording engineers; Nico González & Nicolás Ramírez, album mixers; Camilo, songwriter; Adam Ayan, album mastering engineer
- Xande Canta Caetano – Xande de Pilares
  - Pretinho Da Serrinha, album producer; Igor Ferreira, album recording engineer; Igor Ferreira, album mixer; Caetano Veloso, songwriter; Alexandre Rabaço, album mastering engineer
- Mañana Será Bonito (Bichota Season) – Karol G
  - Sky Rompiendo, album producer; Joel Iglesias, album recording engineer; Josh Gudwin & Joel Iglesias, album mixers; Karol G, Ovy on the Drums & Sky Rompiendo, songwriters; Dave Kutch, album mastering engineer
- García – Kany García
  - Rafa Arcaute & Richi López, album producers; Rafa Arcaute & Richi López, album recording engineers; Lewis Pickett, album mixer; Rafa Arcaute, Kany García, Richi López & Juan Morelli, songwriters; Felipe Tichauer, album mastering engineer
- Autopoiética – Mon Laferte
  - Manú Jalil & Mon Laferte, album producers; Isaí Araujo, Manú Jalil, Daniel Martínez, Joel Orta Oviedo & Pablo Rojas, album recording engineers; Ignacio Sotelo, album mixer; Mon Laferte, songwriter; Chalo González, album mastering engineer
- Boca Chueca, Vol. 1 – Carín León
  - Israel Aispuro Meneses & Orlando Aispuro Meneses, album producers; Israel Aispuro Meneses & Orlando Aispuro Meneses, album recording engineers; Alberto Medina, album mixer; Edgar Barrera, songwriter; Alberto Medina, album mastering engineer
- Las Letras Ya No Importan – Residente
  - Residente, album producer; Beatriz Artola, album recording engineer; Beatriz Artola, album mixer; Leo Genovese, Jeffrey Peñalva & Residente, songwriters; Ted Jensen, album mastering engineer
- Las Mujeres Ya No Lloran – Shakira
  - Alberto Carlos Melendez & Shakira, album producers; Dave Clauss, Roger Rodés & Dani Val, album recording engineers; Dave Clauss, album mixer; Kevyn Mauricio Cruz, Alberto Carlos Melendez & Shakira, songwriters; Adam Ayan, album mastering engineer
**Song of the Year**
- **"Derrumbe" – Jorge Drexler, songwriter (Jorge Drexler)**
  - "A Fuego Lento" – Daymé Arocena & Vicente García, songwriters (Daymé Arocena & Vicente Garcia)
  - "A la Mitad" – Julio Reyes Copello & Mariana Vega, songwriters (Maura Nava)
  - "Aún Me Sigo Encontrando" – Rubén Blades, Gian Marco & Julio Reyes Copello, songwriters (Gian Marco & Rubén Blades)
  - "Caracas en el 2000" – Marvin Hawkins Rodriguez, Jerry Di, La Pichu, Danny Ocean & Elena Rose, songwriters (Elena Rose, Danny Ocean & Jerry Di)
  - "(Entre Paréntesis)" – Édgar Barrera, Kevyn Mauricio Cruz, Manuel Lorente Freire, Lenin Yorney Palacios & Shakira, songwriters (Shakira & Grupo Frontera)
  - "Mi Ex Tenía Razón" – Édgar Barrera, Andrés Jael Correa Rios, Kevyn Mauricio Cruz Moreno, Karol G & Mag, songwriters (Karol G)
  - "Según Quién" – Édgar Barrera, Kevyn Mauricio Cruz, Luís Miguel Gómez Castaño, Maluma, Lenin Yorney Palacios & Juan Camilo Vargas, songwriters (Maluma & Carín León)
  - "Te Lo Agradezco" – Rafa Arcaute, Kany García, Carín León & Richi López, songwriters (Kany García & Carín León)
  - "313" – Leo Genovese, Residente & Sílvia Pérez Cruz, songwriters (Residente, Sílvia Pérez Cruz & Penélope Cruz)
**Best New Artist**
- **Ela Taubert**
  - Agris
  - Kevin Aguilar
  - Darumas
  - Nicolle Horbath
  - Latin Mafia
  - Cacá Magalhães
  - Os Garotin
  - Íñigo Quintero
  - Sofi Saar
  - Jeyhanth

=== Pop ===
**Best Pop Vocal Album**: **El Viaje – Luis Fonsi**; Tofu – Caloncho; .mp3 – Emilia; Hotel Caracas – Mau y Ricky; Orquídeas – Kali Uchis; Escrita – Nicole Zignago	**Best Traditional Pop Vocal Album**: **García – Kany García**; Obras Maestras – Diego El Cigala; Mar Adentro – Juliana; Aún Me Sigo Encontrando – Gian Marco; Almas Paralelas – Laura Pausini
**Best Pop Song**: **"Feriado" – Manuel Lorente Freire, Héctor Mazzarri, Alberto Montenegro, Daniel Rondón & Andres Story, songwriters (Rawayana)**; "A la Mitad" – Julio Reyes Copello & Mariana Vega, songwriters (Maura Nava); "A las 3" – Paty Cantú, Ángela Dávalos, Leon Leiden & Saibu, songwriters (Paty Cantú & León Leiden); "Ahora" – David Bisbal, Pablo Preciado & Carlos Rivera, songwriters (David Bisbal & Carlos Rivera); "Amor" – José Andrés Benitez, Christian Bermudez, Richard Bermudez, Rodney Kumbirayi Hwingwiri, Juan Diego Linares, Luis Alejandro Márquez, Anibal Morin Diaz, Danny Ocean & Rafael Salcedo, songwriters (Danny Ocean); "Dime Quién" – Lagos, songwriter (Lagos); "Igual Que un Ángel" – Carter Lang, Manuel Lorente Freire, Kali Uchis & Dylan Wiggins, songwriters (Kali Uchis & Peso Pluma)

=== Electronic Music ===
**Best Latin Electronic Music Performance**
- **"Bzrp Music Sessions, Vol. 53" (Tiësto Remix) – Bizarrap, Shakira & Tiësto**
  - "La Ceniza" – Ale Acosta featuring Valeria Castro
  - "Drum Machine" – Alok
  - "Pedju Kunumigwe" – Alok & Guarani Nhandewa
  - "BAMBOLE" – Vikina featuring Deorro

=== Urban ===
Irban Field
**Best Urban Fusion/Performance**: **"Tranky Funky" – Trueno**; "Nadie Sabe" – Bad Bunny; "Corazon Vacio" – María Becerra; "Young Miko: Bzrp Music Sessions, Vol. 58" – Bizarrap & Young Miko; "S91" – Karol G	**Best Reggaeton Performance**: **"Perro Negro" – Bad Bunny featuring Feid**; "Un Preview" – Bad Bunny; "Triple S" – J Balvin featuring Jowell & Randy & De la Ghetto; "Byak" – Álvaro Díaz featuring Rauw Alejandro; "Qlona" – Karol G featuring Peso Pluma; "Labios Mordidos" – Kali Uchis featuring Karol G
**Best Urban Music Album**: **Mañana Será Bonito (Bichota Season) – Karol G**; Nadie Sabe Lo Que Va a Pasar Mañana – Bad Bunny; Sol María – Eladio Carrión; Sayonara – Álvaro Díaz; Ferxxocalipsis – Feid; El Último Baile – Trueno	**Best Rap/Hip Hop Song**: **"Aprender a Amar" – Pablo Drexler, Alberto Escámez López & Nathy Peluso, songwriters (Nathy Peluso)**; "Bendecido" – Eladio Carrión, songwriters (Eladio Carrión); "Blam Blam" – Al2 El Aldeano & Vico C, songwriters (Vico C featuring Al2 El Aldeano); "La Sabia Escuela" – Akapellah, Leonardo Daniel Díaz, Jose Gonzalez Ollarves, Marlon Luis Morales Santana, Luis Jacinto Muñoz Hernandez & Pedro Elias Querales, songwriters (Akapellah featuring Canserbero & Lil Supa); "Teléfono Nuevo" – Bad Bunny & Luar La L, songwriters (Bad Bunny featuring Luar La L); "Thunder y Lightning" – Bad Bunny & Eladio Carrión, songwriters (Bad Bunny featuring Eladio Carrión)
**Best Urban Song**: **"Bonita" – Daddy Yankee, songwriter (Daddy Yankee)**; "Columbia" – Quevedo, songwriter (Quevedo); "El Cielo" – Feid, Nicolás Jaña Galleguillos, Gabriel Mora Quintero, Andrés David Restrepo Echavarria, Sky Rompiendo & Myke Towers, songwriters (Sky Rompiendo, Feid & Myke Towers); "La Falda" – Julio Emmanuel Batista Santos, Carlos Alberto Butter Aguila, Orlando J. Cepeda Matos, Ralph Jemar Milln Calderon, Jose Reyes, Myke Towers & Siggy Vazquez Rodriguez, songwriters (Myke Towers); "Luna" – Feid, songwriters (Feid featuring ATL Jacob); "Qlona" – Karol G, Daniel Esteban Gutiérrez, Ovy on the Drums & Peso Pluma, songwriters (Karol G featuring Peso Pluma)

=== Rock ===
Rock Field
**Best Rock Album**: **El Dorado (En Vivo) – Aterciopelados**; Diáspora Live Vol.1 – La Vida Bohème; Herencia Lebón – David Lebón; Alicia en el Metalverso – Mägo de Oz; Mi Mejor Enemigo – Viniloversus	**Best Rock Song**: **"No Me Preguntes (Live)" – Jesús Quintero & Draco Rosa, songwriters (Draco Rosa)**; "Algo Bueno Tenía Que Tener (Bogotá)" – Diamante Eléctrico & Andrés Kenguan, songwriters (Diamante Eléctrico); "Animal Temporal" – Viniloversus, songwriters (Viniloversus); "Camaleónica" – Ali Stone, songwriter (Ali Stone); "Qué Más Quieres" – Anton Curtis Delost, Shaun Lopez, Kathryn Ostenberg, Monica Velez & The Warning, songwriters (The Warning)
**Best Pop/Rock Album**: **Reflejos de lo Eterno – Draco Rosa**; Cuando Ella Me Besó Probé a Dios – Bruses; Jet Love – Conociendo Rusia; Jay de la Cueva – Jay de la Cueva; Adentro – Francisca Valenzuela	**Best Pop/Rock Song**: **"Cinco Horas Menos" – Conociendo Rusia & Natalia Lafourcade, songwriters (Conociendo Rusia featuring Natalia Lafourcade)**; "Acapulco" – Emmanuel Horvilleur, Siddhartha & Rul Velázquez, songwriters (Siddhartha & Emmanuel Horvilleur); "Afilá" – Ali Stone, songwriter (Ali Stone); "Blanco y Negro" – Christian Mauricio Aloisio Zavala, Lagos & Elena Rose, songwriters (Lagos featuring Elena Rose); "Diciembre" – Los Mesoneros, songwriters (Los Mesoneros)

=== Alternative ===
Alternative Field
**Best Alternative Music Album**: **Autopoiética – Mon Laferte**; Por Cesárea – Dillom; Hiper – Hello Seahorse!; Nica – Nicole Horts; Pandora – Ali Stone; DESCARTABLE – Wos	**Best Alternative Song**: **"El Día Que Perdí Mi Juventud" – Devonté Hynes & Nathy Peluso, songwriters (Nathy Peluso)**; "Cabecear" – J Noa, Jeffrey Peñalva "Trooko" & Skai, songwriters (J Noa); "Déjalo Ir" – Francisco Rojas & Francisca Valenzuela, songwriters (Francisca Valenzuela); "Insomnia" – Goyo, Illmind, Omar Isaiah Lupuku, Don Mills, Carlos Santander & Telly, songwriters (Goyo); "Lloro" – Nicole Horts, Camilo Velez & Maria Vertiz, songwriters (Nicole Horts)

=== Singer-Songwriter ===
**Best Singer-Songwriter Album**: **Pausa – Leonel García**; Compita del Destino – El David Aguilar; Scratch de Versos – El Riqué; De Magia Imperfecta – Nicolle Horbath; El Abrazo – Rozalén	**Best Singer-Songwriter Song**: **"Derrumbe" – Jorge Drexler, songwriter (Jorge Drexler)**; **"García" – Kany García, songwriter (Kany García)**; "Antes Que O Mundo Acabe" – Tiago Iorc, songwriter (Tiago Iorc); "Entonces" – Rozalén, songwriter (Rozalén); "Luz de Cabeza" – El David Aguilar, songwriter (El David Aguilar)

=== Tropical ===
Tropical Field
**Best Salsa Album**: **Siembra: 45° Aniversario (En Vivo en el Coliseo de Puerto Rico, 14 de Mayo 2022) – Rubén Blades and Roberto Delgado & Orquesta**; Yo Deluxe – Christian Alicea; Muevense – Marc Anthony; Joyas Que Bailan – Ronald Borjas; Coexistencia – Luis Figueroa	**Best Cumbia/Vallenato Album**: '**Ta Malo – Silvestre Dangond**; De la Uno a la 1000 (Primera Temporada) – Omar Geles; Se Agradece – Los Ángeles Azules; Vallenatos Pa Enamorar – Osmar Pérez & Geño Gamez; La Sociedad de la Cumbia (Big Band Live) – Puerto Candelaria
**Best Merengue/Bachata Album**: **Radio Güira – Juan Luis Guerra 4.40**; Agradecido Live! – Eddy Herrera; Superhéroe Merengue – Magic Juan; Lo Tengo Todo – Oscarito; Llamada Perdida – Prince Royce	**Best Traditional Tropical Album**: **Rodando por el Mundo – José Alberto "El Canario"**; Tengo Algo Que Decirte – Luis Fernando Borjas; Voces de Mi Familia – Alex Cuba; Los Mismos Negros – Yelsy Heredia; A Mis Ancestros – Yeisy Rojas
**Best Contemporary Tropical Album**: **Tropicalia – Fonseca**; Epílogo: La Clave del Tiempo – Jeremy Bosch; cuatro – Camilo; Monte Adentro – Gusi; La Fiesta – Ilegales	**Best Tropical Song**: **"Mambo 23" – Juan Luis Guerra, songwriter (Juan Luis Guerra 4.40)**; "Baila y Goza" – Renesito Avich & Rafael "Pollo" Brito, songwriters (Renesito Avich featuring Rafael "Pollo" Brito); "Con Dinero y Sin Dinero" – Jorge Luis Chacín, Fonseca & Miguel Yadam González Cárdenas, songwriters (Fonseca & Grupo Niche); "Hasta Que Aguante el Cuerpo" – Jorge Luis Piloto, songwriter (Dayhan Díaz & Pupy Santiago); "Llorar Bonito" – Luis Figueroa & Yoel Henríquez, songwriters (Luis Figueroa)

=== Regional-Mexican ===
Field
**Best Ranchero/Mariachi Album**: **Te Llevo en la Sangre – Alejandro Fernández**; Mariachi y Tequila (Deluxe) – Majo Aguilar; Que Llueva Tequila – Pepe Aguilar; Romances Eternos – Mariachi Sol de México de José Hernández	**Best Banda Album**: **Diamantes – Chiquis**; Presente – Julión Álvarez y Su Norteño Banda; Yo Te Extrañaré – Luis Ángel "El Flaco"
**Best Tejano Album**: **Imperfecto – El Plan**; Siempre Gabriella – Gabriella; Ganas (Deluxe) – Vilax	**Best Norteño Album**: **El Comienzo – Grupo Frontera**; Modus Operandi – Intocable; LNDT – Los Nietos de Terán; Te Amaré – Pesado; Terca – Sofi Saar
**Best Contemporary Mexican Music Album**: **Boca Chueca, Vol. 1 – Carín León**; Nata Montana – Natanael Cano; EVOLUXION – DannyLux; Jugando a Que No Pasa Nada – Grupo Frontera; Trastornado – Michelle Maciel; Génesis – Peso Pluma	**Best Regional Mexican Song**: **"El Amor de Su Vida" – Édgar Barrera & Kevyn Mauricio Cruz, songwriters (Grupo Frontera & Grupo Firme)**; "Aquí Mando Yo" – Héctor Guerrero, songwriter (Los Tigres del Norte); "Canción Para Olvidarte" – Mango, Nabález, Chris Zadley & Nicole Zignago, songwriters (Majo Aguilar); "Por el Contrario" – Édgar Barrera, Becky G, Kevyn Mauricio Cruz & Elena Rose, songwriters (Becky G featuring Angela Aguilar & Leonardo Aguilar); "Tienes Que Ser Tú" – Salvador Aponte & Yoel Henríquez, songwriters (La Energía Norteña)

=== Instrumental ===
**Best Instrumental Album**
- **Tembla – Hamilton de Holanda & C4 Trio**
  - Impronta – Omar Acosta
  - Claude Bolling Goes Latin – Suite for Flute and Latin Music Ensemble – Carlomagno Araya, Jose Valentino & The Latin Music Ensemble
  - Capriccio Latino – Alexis Cárdenas
  - Encontro Das Águas – Yamandu Costa & Armandinho Macêdo

=== Jazz ===
**Best Latin Jazz/Jazz Album**
- **Pra Você, Ilza – Hermeto Pascoal & Grupo**
  - Collab – Hamilton de Holanda & Gonzalo Rubalcaba
  - Searching for a Memory (Busco Tu Recuerdo) – Sammy Figueroa featuring Gonzalo Rubalcaba & Aymée Nuviola
  - My Heart Speaks – Ivan Lins
  - El Arte del Bolero, Vol. 2 – Miguel Zenón & Luis Perdomo

=== Christian ===
**Best Christian Album (Spanish Language)**: **Kintsugi – Un Corazón**; Necesito de Ti – Jesús Israel; No Yo, Sino Cristo – Majo y Dan; Maverick – Redimi2; Tu Iglesia – Marcos Witt	**Best Christian Album (Portuguese Language)**: **Deixa Vir - Vol II (Ao Vivo) – Thalles Roberto**; Ele É Jesus - Ao Vivo – Bruna Karla; In Concert (Ao Vivo) – Rosa de Saron; Vida (Ao Vivo) – Eli Soares; Temporal – Vocal Livre

=== Children's Music ===
**Best Latin Children's Album**
- **¡A Cantar! – Danilo & Chapis**
  - Navidad de Norte a Sur: Cantoaegre Big Band (En Vivo) – Cantoalegre & Orquesta La Pascasia
  - Cantemos Juntos – Claraluna
  - Dun Dun Dara – Payasitas Nifu Nifa
  - Todos Podemos Cantas 2024 – Todos Podemos Cantar

=== Traditional ===
Traditional Field
**Best Folk Album**: **Raíz Nunca Me Fuí – Lila Downs, Niña Pastori & Soledad**; Canto y Río – Martina Camargo; C4 Suena a Navidad – C4 Trío; Paisajes – Ciro Hurtado; Bullerengue y Tonada – Tonada	**Best Tango Album**: **Apiazolado – Diego Schissi Quinteto**; El Cantor de Tangos – Guillermo Fernández featuring Cristian Zarate; Tangos Cruzados – Franco Luciani & Fabrizio Mocata; ¿Y el Fin del Amor? – Mariana Mazú; Ya Está en el Aire – Ulmann Cuarteto	**Best Flamenco Album**: **Historias de un Flamenco – Antonio Rey**; Andenes del Tiempo – Vicente Amigo; Rumberas – Las Migas

=== Portuguese Language ===
Portuguese Language Field
**Best Portuguese Language Contemporary Pop Album**: **Os Garotin de São Gonçalo – Os Garotin**; Afrodhit – IZA; Super – Jão; Amaríssima – Melly; Escândalo Íntimo – Luísa Sonza	**Best Portuguese Language Rock or Alternative Album**: **Erasmo Esteves – Erasmo Carlos**; No Rastro de Catarina – Cátia de França; Me Chama de Gato Que Eu Sou Sua – Ana Frango Elétrico; Ontem Eu Tinha Certeza (Hoje Eu Tenho Mais) – Jovem Dionisio; Lagum Ao Vivo – Lagum
**Best Portuguese-Language Urban Performance**: **"Cachimbo da Paz 2" – Gabriel O Pensador, Lulu Santos & Xamã**; "Joga Pra Lua" – Anitta featuring Dennis & Pedro Sampaio; "Da Braba" – Gloria Groove featuring Ludmilla & MC GW; "Carta Aberta" – MC Cabelinho; "Fé nas Maluca" – MC Carol & IZA; "La Noche" – Yago Oproprio featuring Patricio Sid	**Best Samba/Pagode Album**: **Xande Canta Caetano – Xande de Pilares**; Alcione 50 Anos (Ao Vivo) – Alcione; Iboru – Marcelo D2; Tardezinha Pela Vida Inteira (Ao Vivo) – Thiaguinho; Subúrbio (Ao Vivo) – Tiee
**Best MAPB (Música Afro Portuguesa-Brasileira) Album**: **Se o Meu Peito Fosse o Mundo – Jota.Pê**; D Ao Vivo Maceió – Djavan; Portas (Ao Vivo) – Marisa Monte; Outros Cantos – Milton Nascimento & Chitãozinho & Xororó; No Tempo da Intolerância – Elza Soares	**Best Sertaneja Music Album**: **Boiadeira Internacional (Ao Vivo) – Ana Castela**; Paraíso Particular (Ao Vivo) – Gusttavo Lima; Cintilante (Ao Vivo) – Simone Mendes; Raiz Goiânia (Ao Vivo) – Lauana Prado; Luan City 2.0 (Ao Vivo) – Luan Santana
**Best Portuguese Language Roots Album**: **Mariana e Mestrinho – Mariana Aydar & Mestrinho**; Aguidavi do Jêje – Aguidavi Do Jêje & Luizinho Do Jêje; De Norte a Sul – João Gomes; Night Clube Forró Latino (Volume I) – Marcelo Jeneci; Faróis do Sertão – Gabriel Sater	**Best Portuguese Language Song**: **"Ouro Marrom" – Jota.Pê, songwriter (Jota.Pê)**; "Alinhamento Milenar" – Jão, Pedro Tófani & Zebu, songwriters (Jão); "Ata-me" – Junio Barreto, songwriter (Alaíde Costa); "Chico" – Bruno Caliman, Carolzinha, Douglas Moda, Jenni Mosello & Luísa Sonza, songwriters (Luísa Sonza); "Esperança" – Criolo, Dino D'Santiago, Amaro Freitas & Nave, songwriters (Criolo, Dino D'Santiago & Amaro Freitas)

=== Classical ===
Classical and Arrangement Fields
**Best Classical Album**
- **Fandango – Los Angeles Philharmonic**
  - **Anne Akiko Meyers & Gustavo Castillo; Gustavo Dudamel, conductor; Dmitry Lipay, album producer**
- Aire, Aire... No Puedo Respirar – Nueva Filarmonía
  - Ricardo Jaramillo, conductor; Ricardo Jaramillo, Jefferson Rosas & Marcela Zorro, album producers
- Credo for Orchestra, Choir and Five Soloists – Simón Bolívar Symphony Orchestra & Simón Bolívar National Choir
  - Iván Cardozo, Fernando Escalona, Claudio González, Jhoxiris Medina & Grace Terán; Christian Vásquez, conductor; Maria Beatriz Cárdenas, Eugenio Carreño & Eduardo Martínez Planas, album producers
- Fantasies of Buenos Aires – Lincoln Trio
  - Lincoln Trio; Daniel Binelli & Ted Viviani, album producers
- The Latin Rites – ADDA Simfònica Alicante
  - Josep Vicent, conductor; Fernando Arias, album producer
**Best Classical Contemporary Composition**
- **"Fandango"**
  - **Arturo Márquez, composer (Los Angeles Philharmonic, Gustavo Dudamel & Anne Akiko Meyers)**
- "Caribben Berceuse"
  - Paquito D'Rivera, composer (Barcelona Clarinet Players, Paquito D'Rivera, North Texas Wind Symphony; Eugene Migliaro Corporon, conductor)
- "Concerto for Electric Bass and Orchestra – Live at Adrienne Arsht Center Miami"
  - Rodner Padilla, composer (Rodner Padilla, Miami Symphony Orchestra; Eduardo Marturet, conductor)
- "La Minerva – III. Himno a la Mujer"
  - Juan Pablo Contreras, composer (Juan Pablo Contreras, Orquesta Latino Mexicana, Angélica Olivo)
- "Meditation No. 1"
  - Julien Labro, composer (Takács Quartet & Julien Labro)
- "Sueño Austral"
  - Daniel Freiberg, composer (Barcelona Clarinet Players, Freiburger Blasorchester, Miguel Etchegoncelay & Daniel Freiberg)

=== Arrangement ===
**Best Arrangement**
- **"Night in Tunisia"**
  - **Hilario Durán, arranger (Hilario Durán and His Latin Jazz Big Band featuring Paquito D'Rivera)**
- "Sueño Austral"
  - Daniel Freiberg, arranger (Barcelona Clarinet Players, Freiburger Blasorchester, Miguel Etchegoncelay & Daniel Freiberg)
- "Fuego de Noche, Nieve de Dia"
  - Julio Reyes Copello, arranger (Ricky Martin & Christian Nodal)
- "Linha de Passe"
  - Nailor Proveta, arranger (Orquestra Jazz de Matosinhos, Gabi Guedes & Kiko Freitas)
- "Rapsodia Aérea"
  - Andrés Soto, arranger (Andrés Soto, Orquesta Sinfónica Nacional de Costa Rica & Carl St. Clair)

=== Recording Package ===
**Best Recording Package**
- **En Vivo – 100 Años de Azúcar**
  - **Nelson Albareda, Sebastian Aristizabal, Kemelly Figueroa-Mouriz, Omer Pardillo-Cid & Albertico Rodríguez, art directors (Celia Cruz)**
- **Karma**
  - **Carlos Ortiz, art director (Diana Burco)**
- Figurantes
  - Boa Mistura, art director (Vetusta Morla)
- Realismo Mágico
  - Carlos Sadness, art director (Carlos Sadness)
- Tekoá
  - Leonardo Macias, art director (Jair Oliveira)

=== Songwriting ===
**Songwriter of the Year**
- **Édgar Barrera**
  - **"Cuestion de Tiempo" (Don Omar)**
  - **"En Tus Sueños o En Los Míos" (Camilo)**
  - **"(Entre Paréntesis)" (Shakira & Grupo Frontera)**
  - **"Mi Ex Tenía Razón" (Karol G)**
  - **"No Se Vale" (Camilo)**
  - **"Ojos Verdes" (Nicki Nicole)**
  - **"The One (Pero No Como Yo)" (Carin León & Kane Brown)**
  - **"Por el Contrario" (Becky G, Angela Aguilar & Leonardo Aguilar)**
  - **"XL" (Grupo Firme & Luis Mexia)**
- Yoel Henríquez
  - "Equipo Favorito" (India Martínez featuring La Adictiva)
  - "Eres Tú" (Diego Torres)
  - "La Que Se Nos Viene" (Emmanuel)
  - "La Sicóloga" (Fonseca)
  - "Llorar Bonito" (Luis Figueroa)
  - "Mi X" (Kenia Os)
  - "Tienes Que Ser Tú" (La Energía Norteña)
  - "Todas Menos Una" (Luis Figueroa)
- Manuel Lorente Freire
  - "El Jefe" (Shakira & Fuerza Regida)
  - "(Entre Paréntesis)" (Shakira & Grupo Frontera)
  - "Existo" (Carin León & Pedro Capó)
  - "Feriado" (Rawayana)
  - "Igual Que un Ángel" (Kali Uchis & Peso Pluma)
  - "Legendario" (Nathy Peluso)
  - "Nunca La Olvidé" (Grupo Frontera)
  - "2ndo Chance" (Becky G & Iván Cornejo)
  - "Vocation" (Ozuna & David Guetta)
- Horacio Palencia
  - "Ahí la Llevo" (Carin León & Hijos de Barron)
  - "Alch Si" (Carin León & Grupo Frontera)
  - "Alguien de Aquí" (Nathan Galante & Gerardo Coronel)
  - "Buen Provecho" (La Adictiva & Gerardo Coronel)
  - "En Altavoz" (Grupo Frontera & Junior H)
  - "Ojitos Rojos" (Grupo Frontera & Ke Personajes)
  - "Se Cancela la Depre (En Vivo)" (Grupo Firme)
  - "Tu Perfume" (Banda Ms De Sergio Lizárraga)
  - "Ya Pedo Quién Sabe" (Grupo Frontera & Christian Nodal)
- Pablo Preciado
  - "Ahora" (David Bisbal & Carlos Rivera)
  - "Corazón a Medio Día" (Pepe Aguilar)
  - "De Tanto" (Chayanne)
  - "El Amor Cuando Se Va" (Intocable)
  - "Hasta Que Me Duermo" (Pepe Aguilar)
  - "Mi Alma Rota (Tanto)" (Intocable)
  - "Ojalá Estuvieras Aquí" (Intocable)
  - "Te Acuerdas" (Ha*Ash & Reik)

=== Production ===
Production, Songwriting and Package Fields
**Producer of the Year**: **Édgar Barrera**; **"Cosas de la Peda" (Prince Royce featuring Gabito Ballesteros)**; **"Cuando la Vida Sea Trago" (Carin León)**; **"Difícil Tu Caso" (Alejandro Fernández)**; **"El Jefe" (Shakira & Fuerza Regida)**; **Esquinas (Becky G)**; **Jugando a Que No Pasa Nada (Grupo Frontera)**; **"Me Gusta Tu Flow" (Arcángel)**; **"Mi Ex Tenía Razón" (Karol G)**; **Obsessed Pt. 2 (Yahritza y Su Esencia)**; **"Según Quién" (Maluma & Carin León)**; Eduardo Cabra; Alkemi (Daymé Arocena); "Bachaqué" (Mima); Esta Vida Que Elegí (St. Pedro); "Guarapo y Flor" (Seba Otero & Bebo Dumont); "Malabar" (Seba Otero featuring Irepelusa); Manual de Romería (Rodrigo Cuevas); "Miel" (Rawayana, Rafa Pabön & Cabra); Nico Cotton; "Atelier" (Chita); "Diamante" (Louta & Elsa y Elmar); "Faltas Tú" (Morat); Jet Love (Conociendo Rusia); "La Carta" (Daniela Spalla); "La Vivida Noche" (Usted Señálemelo); "Pelo Suelto" (Elsa y Elmar & Conociendo Rusia); "Siempre Que Lo Beso" (Miranda! & Kenia Os); "Un Día" (Lara91k & Julieta Venegas); "X Siempre" (Usted Señalemelo); Juan Luis Guerra & Janina Rosado; Capitán Avispa (Original Motion Picture Soundtrack) (Juan Luis Guerra 4.40); Radio Güira (Juan Luis Guerra 4.40); Julio Reyes Copello; "A La Mitad" (Maura Nava); "Aún Me Sigo Encontrando" (Gian Marco & Rubén Blades); "Fuego de Noche, Nieve de Día" (Ricky Martin & Christian Nodal); "Los Sueños de Tu Vida" (Gian Marco & Silvio Rodríguez); "Nacimos Solos" (Juanes); "Perderme" (Morat); "Quise Quererte" (Joaquina); "Se Te Va a Olvidar" (Agris); "Si Me Llevas Contigo" (Carin León featuring Keith Urban & Rosario); "Vale la Pena" (Laura Pausini)	**Best Engineered Album**: **Se o Meu Peito Fosse o Mundo**; **Thiago Baggio, Will Bone, Leonardo Emocija, Rodrigo Lemos & Felipe Vassão, engineers; João Milliet, mixer; Felipe Tichauer, mastering engineer (Jota.Pê)**; Analu; Tó Brandileone, engineer; Daniel Musy, mixer; André Dias, mastering engineer (Analu Sampaio); Era Uma Vez; Pedro Peixoto & Matheus Stiirmer, engineers; Pedro Peixoto, mixer; Fili Filizzola, mastering engineer (Mobi Colombo); Os Garotin De São Gonçalo; Uiliam Pimenta, Julio Raposo & Pepê Santos, engineers; Bernardo Martins, mixer; Felipe Tichauer, mastering engineer (Os Garotin); Quem É Ela?; Túlio Airold, Alex Dos Reis Silva & Gianlucca Pernechele Azevedo, engineers; João Milliet, mixer; Fili Filizzola, mastering engineer (Mariana Nolasco)

=== Music video ===
Music Video Field
**Best Short Form Music Video**: **"313" – Residente featuring Penélope Cruz & Sílvia Pérez Cruz**; **Residente, video director; Carolina Wolf, video producer**; "Ale Ale" – Marc Anthony; Carlos Pérez, video director; Joanna Egozcue, video producer; "Baticano" – Bad Bunny; Stillz, video director; "Oliveira dos cen anos" – C. Tangana; C. Tangana, video director; "Sálvanos" – Leonel García; Nuno Gomes, video director and video producer; "Glock" – Mau y Ricky; Daniel Duran, video director; Alegna Espinoza & Maricel Zambrano, video producers	**Best Long Form Music Video**: **Grasa (Album Long Form) – Nathy Peluso**; **Agustín Puente, video director**; Beautiful Humans Vol 1. Documental – AleMor; Wismer Jimenez, video director; AleMor & Wismer Jimenez, video producers; Meu Karma – Jovem Mk; Kaique Alves, Gabriel Avelar & Beto Galloni, video directors; Rodrigo Castello, Mariê Nunes & Eduardo Saraiva, video producers; Hotel Caracas – Mau y Ricky; Daniel Duran, video director; Alegna Espinoza & Maricel Zambrano, video producer; Nacimos Llorando – Rubio; Fernando Cattori, video director; Luis Betances, Fernando Cattori, Josep Pardo, Jaume Rigual, Ana Laura Solis, Aura Solis & Joe Solis, video producers

== Background ==
In March 2024, the Latin Recording Academy announced several changes for different categories:

=== Category changes ===
- The linguistic requirement for a recording to be eligible is now 60% of its content in Spanish, Portuguese, or in languages, dialects or idiomatic expressions recognized in Ibero-America. Previously, the requirement was only 51%.
- Two new categories were introduced – Best Latin Electronic Music Performance (as a part of the new Electronic Music Field) and Best Contemporary Mexican Music Album.
- The category for Best MPB (Musica Popular Brasileira) Album was renamed into Best MAPB (Música Afro Portuguesa-Brasileira) Album.
- In order to be eligible for the Best Singer-Songwriter Song, the song must be new and both composed and performed 100% by the singer-songwriter(s).
- The duration for the eligible videos for the category for Best Long Form Music Video was reduced from 20 minutes to 12.
- New rules were added regarding the number of nominations, which will be based on the number of entries per category:
  - "If a category receives between 25 and 39 entries, only three recordings will receive nominations in that year. Should there be fewer than 25 entries in a category, that category will immediately go on hiatus for the current year and entries will be screened into the next most logical category. If a category receives fewer than 25 entries for three consecutive years, the category will be discontinued, and submissions will be entered in the next most appropriate category."

== Multiple nominations ==
The following received multiple nominations:

Nine:

- Édgar Barrera

Eight:

- Karol G
- Bad Bunny

Six:

- Kevyn Mauricio Cruz

Five:

- Julio Reyes Copello
- Juan Luis Guerra
- Peso Pluma
- Adam Ayan

Four:

- Kali Uchis
- Feid
- Kany García
- Carín León

Three:

- Nathy Peluso
- Mon Laferte
- Ali Stone
- Eladio Carrión
- Mau y Ricky
- Camilo
- Fonseca
- Residente
- Shakira
- Jorge Drexler
- Rafa Arcaute
- MAG
- Felipe Tichauer
- Janina Rosado
- Yoel Henríquez
- Elena Rose

Two:

- Anitta
- Pepe Aguilar
- Nicolle Horbath
- Sofi Saar
- Os Garotin
- C4 Trio
- Nicole Horts
- Viniloversus
- Draco Rosa
- Lagos
- Xande de Pilares
- Hamilton de Holanda
- Gonzalo Rubalcaba
- Jean Rodriguez
- IZA
- Jota.Pê
- Jão
- Luísa Sonza
- Leonel García
- Sílvia Pérez Cruz
- Danny Ocean
- Rozalén
- Marc Anthony
- Gian Marco
- Álvaro Díaz
- Trueno
- El David Aguilar
- Conociendo Rusia
- Francisca Valenzuela
- Myke Towers
- Rubén Blades
- Luis Figueroa
- Grupo Frontera
- Bizarrap
- Alok
- Dave Kutch
- Colin Leonard
- Josh Gudwin
- Oscar Convers
- Frank Fuentes
- Nico González
- Nicolás Ramírez
- Daniel Uribe
- Mariana Vega
- Allan Leschhorn
- Manú Jalil
- Isaí Araujo
- Daniel Martínez
- Pablo Rojas
- Pablo Preciado
- Ignacio Sotelo
- Manuel Lorente Freire
- Chalo González
- Carter Lang
- Dylan Wiggins
- Ovy on the Drums
- Sky Rompiendo
- Richi López
- Jeffrey Peñalva
- Leo Genovese
- Lenin Yorney Palacios
- Daniel Freiberg
