= Veneka =

Single by Rawayana
- Language: Spanish
- Released: 21 October 2024
- Length: 4:14

Veneka is a single released on 21 October 2024 by the Venezuelan band Rawayana and featuring Akapellah. It was originally planned to be released later, but a leaked song fragment went viral on social media, which prompted the band to advance its release. Besides the popularity in social media, at the time it was Rawayana's biggest streaming debut on Spotify, accumulating 2 million streams in its first week on the platform and reaching #1 on Spotify's Top 50 Venezuela chart within 24 hours of its release. The song won the 2025 Latin Grammy Award for Best Latin Electronic Music Performance in the 26th Annual Latin Grammy Awards.
