= Maye (singer) =

Venezuelan singer

- Maye at the 2026 Latin Grammy Awards

Background information
- Born: Maria Alejandra Osorio; December 1, 1993 (age 32); Caracas, Venezuela
- Origin: Miami, Florida, US
- Genres: Latin pop; indie rock; bolero; dream pop
- Occupations: Singer; songwriter
- Instrument: Vocals
- Years active: 2019-present
- Label: Warner Chappell Music
- Website: www.musicaparaabrirelcielo.com

Maria Alejandra Osorio (born December 1, 1993), better known by her stage name Maye (stylised in all lowercase), is a Venezuelan singer and songwriter based in the United States. She is best known for her single "Tú", which was featured on former President of the United States Barack Obama's 2020 summer playlist. She released her debut album Música Para Abrir El Cielo on June 27, 2025.

== Early life ==
Maye was born in Caracas, and her family moved to Miami when she was young. Her father is Fernando Osorio, a singer-songwriter who won a Latin Grammy Award for Best Tropical Song in 2004. She first started writing songs when she was eight and learned to play the guitar when she was fifteen. Her first songs were in English, but her father encouraged her to write in Spanish as well.

== Career ==
=== 2019–2024: Career beginnings ===
Maye was on the songwriting team of Aitana's song "Nada Sale Mal", and was also part of the songwriting team of Aitana's 2019 debut album Spoiler. She and her father were also part of the songwriting effort behind Danny Ocean's song "Dime Tú", and she performed backing vocals as well.

On March 15, 2019, she released her first single "My Love", which features a switch in tempo at the chorus. The track helped her get her first deal with Warner Chappell Music. On September 16, she released her second single "Tú", which was featured in Barack Obama's annual summer playlist in 2020. In 2020, she also released a cover of J Balvin and Bad Bunny's "La Canción" as a single.

In 2021, she released the singles "Yours" and "Versos de Placer." As part of their celebration of Hispanic Heritage Month, in September NPR Music released Maye's Tiny Desk Concert performance. In January 2022, she released "Descifrar" before embarking as the opening act for the first leg of The Marias's CINEMA tour. She then released "Maybe Baby" in February.

In 2023, she released the single "Kaleidoscope". She also released "Heridas pt. 2" with RØZ and "Mi Hogar" with DannyLux later that year. In November, she opened for Faye Webster on tour. In 2024, she was featured on the song "Qué Bonito!" for Nella's album En Otra Vida.

=== 2025–present: Debut album Música Para Abrir El Cielo and tours ===
On April 4, 2025, Maye released "Yo Me Consiento", the first single of her debut album. On April 8, she announced her first U.S. tour to begin in July, stating "[Fans] can also expect some special guests on tour that are very dear to me". The album's second single "Peter Pan" was released on May 30. On June 27, Maye released her debut album Música Para Abrir El Cielo, which was noted by Billboard as one of the best new Latin albums of the week. On the same day, she released the third single of the album, "Lento", which features Rawayana. The Música Para Abrir El Cielo tour concluded in August and featured her father Fernando Osorio as the opening act.

On September 13, Maye was announced as an "Artist 2 Watch" for the 2025 Premios Juventud. On October 28, Maye released the single "Favorite Place". On March 20, 2026, Maye released the single "La Máquina". On April 2, 2026, Maye released her first extended play, Música Para Abrir el Cielo: Act 2, as an extension of her first album, with the single "Mine". Beginning in April 2026, Maye co-headlined the Entre Dos Mundos tour with singer Ambar Lucid. On May 27, Maye appeared on the album La Frontera by Viniloversus for the song "Supernova". On July 28, she released the single "Creo En Ti". On September 16, Maye was announced as a nominee for Best New Artist for the 27th Annual Latin Grammy Awards.

== Musical style ==
Maye is known for writing boleros as well as songs of the genres indie rock and dream pop. Luisa Calle of Billboard described Maye's music as "an organic fusion of dream pop with nuances of bossa nova, bolero, and Latin influences, articulated with a contemporary Gen Z sensibility." Maye has also been noted for her "sultry vocals and ethereal energy" and ability to switch between English and Spanish in her songs.

== Discography ==
=== Studio albums ===
Title	Details
Música Para Abrir El Cielo	Released: June 27, 2025; Label: Pink Poetry, Warner Chappell Music; Formats: digital download, streaming

=== Extended plays ===
Title	Details
Música Para Abrir El Cielo: Act 2	Released: April 2, 2026; Label: Pink Poetry; Formats: digital download, streaming; Track listing: 1. "Mine"; 2. "La Máquina"; 3. "Favorite Place"; 4. "Not Ready"; 5. "Goodbye?"

=== As lead artist ===
Title	Year	Album
"Roma" (with Rodriogo Solo)	2018	Ego
"My Love"	2019	Non-album singles
"Tú"	2019	Non-album singles
"Moody"	2019	Non-album singles
"La Canción"	2020	Non-album singles
"Yours"	2021	Non-album singles
"Versos de Placer"	2021	Non-album singles
"Descifrar"	2022	Non-album singles
"Maybe Baby"	2022	Non-album singles
"Kaleidoscope"	2023	Non-album singles
"Heridas pt. 2" (with RØZ)	2023	Non-album singles
"Mi Hogar" (with DannyLux)	2023	DLUX
"Qué Bonito!" (with Nella)	2024	En Otra Vida
"Yo Me Consiento"	2025	Música Para Abrir El Cielo
"Peter Pan"	2025	Música Para Abrir El Cielo
"Lento" (with Rawayana)	2025	Música Para Abrir El Cielo
"Favorite Place"	2025	Música Para Abrir El Cielo: Act 2
"La Máquina"	2026	Música Para Abrir El Cielo: Act 2
"Mine"	2026	Música Para Abrir El Cielo: Act 2
"Creo En Ti"	2026	Non-album single

=== As featured artist ===
Title	Year	Album
"Dare" (Mr. Pauer featuring Ana Osorio and Maye Osorio)	2014	Orange
"Alone" (Laguna featuring Top Hat and Maye)	2016	Non-album singles
"It's Not Over" (Laguna featuring Maye)	2016	Non-album singles
"Nothing Will Be As It Was" (Ricardo Bacelar featuring Maye)	2018	Sebastiana
"Todo El Resto En Que No Estás" (Fernando Osorio featuring Maye)	2018	Siempre Comienza
"Azteca" (Viniloversus featuring Maye)	2019	VVV
"Pangea (Revisitado)" (Los Mesoneros featuring Maye)	2020	Non-album single
"Water Your Garden" (Magic City Hippies featuring Maye)	2021	Water Your Garden
"Maybe Baby" (Cheo featuring Maye)	2023	Música Para Verse Bien
"Q.I.S" (Vanessa Zamora featuring Maye)	2025	Non-album single

=== Songwriting credits ===
Title	Year	Artist	Album	Ref.
"Las Olas"	2017	Juan Pablo Vega	Non-album single	
"Paso a Paso"	2018	Fonseca featuring Ana Torroja	Agustín	
"Passengers"	2018	Miriam Rodríguez	Cicatrices	
"Nada Sale Mal"	2019	Aitana	Spoiler	
"Dime Tú"	2019	Danny Ocean	Venequia.	
"Apocalipsis"	2020	Isabela Merced	The Better Half of Me	
"For Ya"	2020	Paloma Mami	Sueños de Dalí	
"Bachatica"	2021	Leslie Grace	Non-album single	
"Tamagotchi"	2022	Omar Apollo	Ivory	
"Luna de Miel"	2023	Alaina Castillo	Malos Hábitos	
"Saboteo"	2023	Alaina Castillo	Malos Hábitos	
"Me Conquistaste"	2023	Alaina Castillo	Malos Hábitos	
"Combustible"	2023	Ventino	Inevitables	
"Playa Pantaleta"	2026	Rawayana	¿Dónde Es El After?	
"Soltero"	2026	Rawayana	¿Dónde Es El After?	
"Creer en el Amor"	2026	Leslie Grace	Amor, Quién Eres?	
"Perros"	2026	Leslie Grace	Amor, Quién Eres?	

== Awards ==
List of awards and nominations received by Maye
Award	Year	Recipient	Category	Result	Ref.
Latin Grammy Awards	2026	Maye	Best New Artist	Nominated	
