= 32nd Brazilian Music Awards =

2025 Brazilian Music Awards

- Date: 4 June 2025
- Location: Theatro Municipal; Rio de Janeiro
- Hosted by: Fabrício Boliveira; Nanda Costa

Highlights
- Most nominations: Emicida (4)
- Website: premiodamusica.com.br

Television/radio coverage
- Network: YouTube

The 32nd Brazilian Music Awards (Portuguese: 32.° Prêmio da Música Brasileira) were held on 4 June 2025, at the Theatro Municipal in Rio de Janeiro, to recognize the Brazilian music of 2024. It was first edition sponsored by BTG Pactual. The ceremony, broadcast on YouTube, was hosted by actors Fabrício Boliveira and Nanda Costa. The duo Chitãozinho & Xororó was honored at the show, becoming the first time that sertanejo music artists were honored.

The nominees were announced in April 2025 by Lázaro Ramos. Emicida led with four nominations.

== Background ==
=== Category changes ===
For the 2025 ceremony, the Brazilian Music Awards announced the introduction of new categories and several changes:

- The Urban Music category has been divided into three: Funk, Rap/Trap and Reggae.
- The Pop/Rock category has been divided into two: Pop and Rock.
- The Popular Song/Sertanejo category has been divided into three: Popular Song, Romantic and Sertanejo.
- The Regional category has been renamed Roots.
- For New Artist category, artist must have up to five years of career since the release of their first published work.
- For Special Project category, children's music become eligible.

=== Artificial intelligence ineligibility ===
In "defense of artistic integrity, the rights of composers, performers, producers, and the entire Brazilian music industry," songs composed, produced, or performed exclusively by artificial intelligence (AI) are not eligible for the award. Additionally, works that use AI or other technologies to replicate the vocals of deceased artists are also disqualified.

== Winners and nominees ==
The nominees were announced on 9 April 2025, at the São Paulo Museum of Art, by Lázaro Ramos. Emicida received the most nominations with four, followed by Amaro Freitas, Ana Castela, Céu, Grelo and Os Garotin with three nominations each.

Winners are listed first and highlighted in boldface.

=== MPB ===
Artist	Release
**João Bosco**; Alaíde Costa; Dori Caymmi; Jota.pê; MPB4	**Se o Meu Peito Fosse o Mundo – Jota.pê**; E o Tempo Agora Quer Voar – Alaíde Costa; "Fé (Ao Vivo)" – Caetano Veloso and Maria Bethânia; Prosa & Papo – Dori Caymmi; 60 Anos de MPB – MPB4

=== Pop ===
Artist	Release
**Liniker**; Céu; Melly; Os Garotin; Tássia Reis	**Caju – Liniker**; Novela – Céu; Amaríssima – Melly; Os Garotin de São Gonçalo – Os Garotin; Topo da Minha Cabeça – Tássia Reis

=== Rock ===
Artist	Release
**Black Pantera**; Carne Doce; CPM 22; Fresno; João Gordo	**Baseado em Fatos Reais: 30 Anos de Fumaça (Ao Vivo) – Planet Hemp**; Ana Canta Cássia – Vol. 1 (Ao Vivo) – Ana Carolina; Perpétuo – Black Pantera; ACNXX Ao Vivo em Salvador – Pitty; Microfonado – Titãs

=== Funk ===
Artist	Release
**Valesca Popozuda**; Deize Tigrona; MC Kevin o Chris; Pedro Sampaio; Torya	**"Amor de Carnaval" – Jup do Bairro, Maria Alcina and Pagode da 27**; Não Tem Rolê Tranquilo – Deize Tigrona; "Ram Tchum" – Dennis, Ana Castela and MC GW; "Sua Preferida" – Ludmilla, WIU and MC Kevin o Chris; Astro – Pedro Sampaio

=== Rap/Trap ===
Artist	Release
**Emicida**; Duquesa; BNegão; MV Bill; Yago Oproprio	**Na Visão do Morador – MV Bill**; "Esperança" – Criolo, Dino D'Santiago and Amaro Freitas; "Acabou, Mas Tem" – Emicida; Direct-to-Disc – Marcelo D2 and SambaDrive; Oproprio – Yago Oproprio

=== Reggae ===
Artist	Release
**Planta & Raiz**; Armandinho; Dasplanta; Mukambu; Núbia	**"Coração Âncora" – Céu and RDD**; "Desses Olhos Tenho Medo" – Armandinho; "Love to Jah" – Gustah, Julian Marley and Rael; Do Gueto ao Kilombo – Mukambu; Sabores – Núbia

=== Samba ===
Artist	Release
**Zeca Pagodinho**; Alcione; Jorge Aragão; Mart'nália; Martinho da Vila	**Zeca Pagodinho – 40 Anos (Ao Vivo) – Zeca Pagodinho**; "Marra de Feroz" – Alcione; Deixa Com a Gente – Antônio Neves; Pagode da Mart'nália – Mart'nália; Violões e Cavaquinhos – Martinho da Vila

=== Sertanejo ===
Artist	Release
**João Gomes**; Ana Castela; Lauana Prado; Rionegro & Solimões; Zezé Di Camargo	**Transcende (Ao Vivo) Vol. 1 – Lauana Prado**; Herança Boiadeira (Ao Vivo) – Ana Castela; Vaquejada Tá na Moda – João Gomes; Check-In (Ao Vivo) – Jorge & Mateus; Rionegro e Solimões em Uberlândia – Rionegro & Solimões

=== Romantic ===
Artist	Release
**Odair José**; Alice Caymmi; Grelo; Roberta Miranda; Simone Mendes	**"É o Grelo" – Grelo**; "O Amor (El Amor)" – Alice Caymmi; Seres Humanos (e a Inteligência Artificial) – Odair José; Infinito, Ep.1 (Ao Vivo) – Roberta Miranda; Cantando Sua História (Ao Vivo/Vol.1 e Vol.2) – Simone Mendes

=== Roots ===
Artist	Release
**Alceu Valença**; Dona Onete; Elba Ramalho; Joelma; Samba de Coco Raízes de Arcoverde	**Mariana e Mestrinho – Mariana Aydar and Mestrinho**; Bicho Maluco Beleza – É Carnaval – Alceu Valença; Bagaceira – Dona Onete; Isso Quer Dizer Amor – Elba Ramalho; J. Velloso e Recôncavo Experimental – J. Velloso and Recôncavo Experimental

=== Instrumental ===
Artist	Release
**Hermeto Pascoal**; Amaro Freitas; Carlos Malta; Hamilton de Holanda Trio; Yamandu Costa	**Y'Y – Amaro Freitas**; Cadê Tereza? – Clube do Balanço; Pra Você, Ilza – Hermeto Pascoal; Estado de Espírito – Roberto Barreto, Manoel Cordeiro and Pupillo; Ida e Volta – Yamandu Costa

=== Other categories ===
New Artist	Electronic Release
**Os Garotin**; Joyce Alane; Grelo; Rachel Reis; Sued Nunes	**Vera Cruz Island – Jadsa, João Milet Meirelles and Taxidermia**; The Mad Wizard's Sampler – Beagle Bonnie and DJ Noé; "100% 13" – Bixiga 70 and DJ Mam; "Know It" – Dre Guazzelli; "MTG Chihiro" – Mulú and Duda Beat
Foreign Language Release	Classical Release
**Invisible Woman – Silvia Machete**; "Encore Un Tour" – Anelis Assumpção; Funk Generation – Anitta; "La Mer" – Caetano Veloso; "Cry Me a River" – Iza	**Heitor Villa-Lobos: Bachianas Brasileiras N.8 (Ao Vivo) – Orquestra Sinfônica Brasileira**; Concerto Místico para Cello e Orquestra – Alexandre Guerra, André Micheletti, Knut Andreas and Orquestra Sinfônica de Piracicaba; Auto da Compadecida, a Ópera – Orquestra Ouro Preto, Maestro Rodrigo Toffolo and Tim Rescala; Canções do Guia Prático, Vol. 2 – Orquestra Petrobras Sinfônica, Heitor Villa Lobos and Felipe Prazeres; Sempre – Quinteto Villa-Lobos
Special Project	Audiovisual Project
**Moraes é Frevo – Orquestra Frevo do Mundo, Pupillo and Davi Moraes**; Um Tributo a Luiz Melodia – Luiz Melodia and Pérolas Negras; "Voando (Nel Blu Dipinto Di Blu)" – Rita Lee and Roberto de Carvalho; Sabotage 50; O Auto da Compadecida 2 (Trilha Sonora do Filme) – Various Artists	**"Voando (Nel Blu Dipinto Di Blu)" – Rita Lee and Roberto de Carvalho**; "A Melhor Saída" – Dora Morelenbaum; "Acabou, Mas Tem..." – Emicida; "Erasmo Esteves (Tijuca Maluca)" – Erasmo Carlos, Rubel and Emicida; "Volta e Meia" – O Terno, Devendra Banhart and Shintaro Sakamoto
