= Latin Grammy Award for Best Electronic Music Performance =

Latin Grammy Award category

- Awarded for: quality vocal or instrumental latin electronic music singles or tracks
- Country: United States
- Presented by: The Latin Recording Academy
- Currently held by: "Beto's Horns (Fred Remix)" – Ca7riel & Paco Amoroso & Fred Again (2026)
- Website: latingrammy.com

The Latin Grammy Award for Best Electronic Music Performance is a recent honor set to be presented annually by the Latin Recording Academy at the Latin Grammy Awards, a ceremony that recognizes excellence and promotes a wider awareness of cultural diversity and contributions of Latin recording artists in the United States and globally.

== History ==
It was awarded for the first time at the 25th Annual Latin Grammy Awards, as the first Latin electronic music category in the ceremony's history. According to the definition category guide, the award is for recordings characterized by a prominent use of electronic instrumentation, often featuring a dance rhythm and incorporating elements of Latin vocal and instrumental music, including subgenres such as EDM, electro, electronic, house, disco, techno, etc.

The recording should prioritize established dance and electronic music recordings, with at least 51% of the playing time dedicated to Latin electronic music genres, as determined by the committee. It should also encompass emerging genres and Latin influences to accurately represent current trends in Latin electronic music. Recordings that include interpolations or samples are eligible, provided that these elements constitute no more than 25% of the lyrics and/or 51% of the music of the original song. Latin electronic remixes are also considered for the award. The statuette is awarded to solo artists, duos or groups.

== Recipients ==
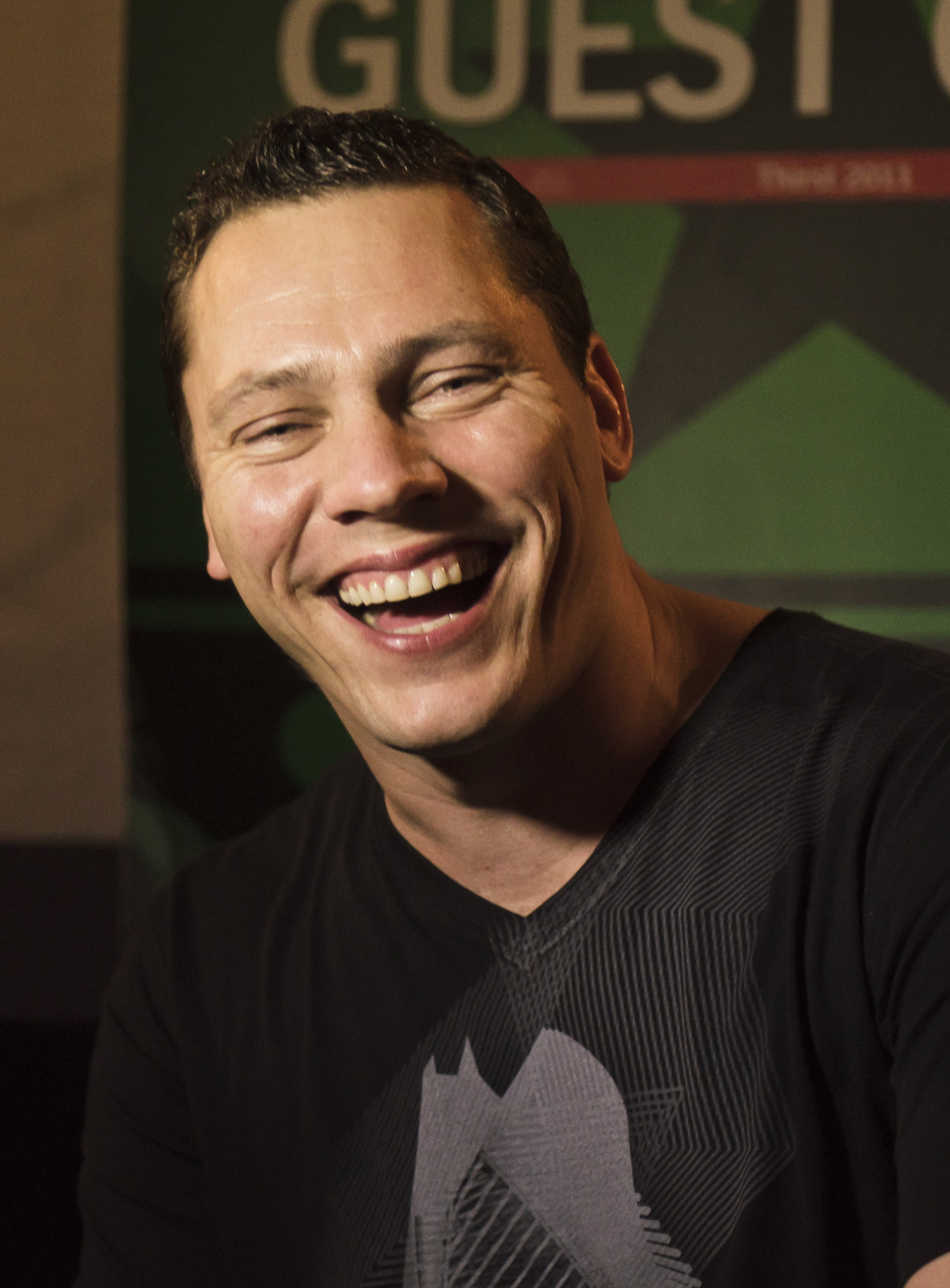
Tiësto, one of the inaugural winners, is the first Dutch artist to win a Latin Grammy.

| Year | Artist | Work | Nominees | Ref. |
|---|---|---|---|---|
| 2024 | Bizarrap, Shakira & Tiësto | "Bzrp Music Sessions, Vol. 53" (Tiësto Remix) | Ale Acosta featuring Valeria Castro – "La Ceniza"; Alok – "Drum Machine"; Alok & Guarani Nhandewa – "Pedju Kunumigwe"; Vikina featuring Deorro – "BAMBOLE" | |
| 2025 | Rawayana featuring Akapellah | "Veneka" | Boza, Elena Rose & Sistek – "Orión" (Sistek Remix); Imanbek & Taichu – "Ella Quiere Techno"; Ela Minus – "QQQQ"; Mr. Pauer, Villa Electronika & DJ Polin – "Rulay En Dubai - (Extended)" | |
| 2026 | Ca7riel & Paco Amoroso & Fred Again | "Beto's Horns (Fred Remix)" | Kinky – "Armándola de Pedo"; Peces Raros featuring Nick Warren – "Circular"; Soucream & Mazzarri – "Motopirueta"; Violeta & Bronquio – "III. Ojalá! (Bronquio Remix)" | |
