= DARUMAS =

DARUMAS is a U.S.-based funk pop band. The group includes Argentine bassist Aldana Aguirre, Cuban-American singer and guitarist Ceci León, and Haitian singer Vedala Vilmond.

The trio first connected through social media, and then traveled to Argentina to record their first songs. DARUMAS was nominated for the Best New Artist Award at the 2024 Latin Grammy Awards. They were also featured at the 2024 Latin Alternative Music Conference (LAMC) in New York City.

In 2025, DARUMAS performed at Rock in Rio and Lollapalooza Argentina.

DARUMAS takes their name from the Japanese daruma doll symbolizing resilience.

== Previous Solo Careers ==
Aldana Aguirre's parents are both musicians. Aldana started playing the bass at age fifteen, and later toured as Karol G's bassist.

Vedala Vilmond was born in Haiti. After moving to Chile at age eleven, she signed with Sony Music Chile at age fifteen. Vilmond's father is a sound engineer.

== Discography ==
- 2024: Darumas (eponymous 7 track album)
