= Nicolle Horbath =

Colombian singer and songwriter

- Horbath at the 2026 Latin Grammy Awards

Background information
- Genres: Jazz, pop, folk music
- Occupation: Singer-songwriter
- Instrument: Vocals
- Years active: 2022–present
- Website: nicollehorbath.com

Nicolle Horbath is a Colombian singer-songwriter. In May 2024, she released her debut EP, De Magia Imperfecta, produced by Latin Grammy Award winner Juan Carlos Pérez Soto. That same year, she received Latin Grammy nominations for Best Singer-Songwriter Album and Best New Artist.

== Biography ==
Horbath is from Barranquilla, Colombia. She studied music with a focus on jazz and popular music at Universidad del Norte in Barranquilla. During her time there, she was the soloist at two editions of the annual Cátedra Europa. In 2017, she graduated with honors and became the first jazz singer to win the Jóvenes Intérpretes competition of the Banco de la República, which allowed her to tour with her show Latinoamérica y el Jazz. In 2022 she was a special guest at the Carnaval Internacional de las Artes, an event organized by journalist and writer Heriberto Fiorillo.

In 2018, Horbath was awarded the "Prodigy Scholarship" from the Latin Grammy Cultural Foundation, sponsored by Carlos Vives, allowing her to begin studies at Berklee College of Music in Boston. There, she earned a degree in film scoring and songwriting. During her time at Berklee, she presented a concert titled The Dream—Viviendo el Sueño with drummer and music director Emanuel Lewis, featuring original compositions, at the Berklee Performance Center.

== Musical career ==
In 2022 Horbath made her debut as a songwriter with the singles Sueña and Florecer. That same year, she was the opening act for Carlos Vives during one of his concerts in Boston as part of his U.S. tour. Later, she performed at the Latin Grammys 2022 ceremony.

In 2023, she participated in NPR's Tiny Desk Contest, where she was selected for the "Top Shelf" category. NPR interviewed Horbath about her song Florecer and its inspiration. That same year, she contributed as a composer, performer, and vocal arranger to the album Beautiful Humans Vol. 1 by AleMor, which was nominated for both a Latin Grammy and a Grammy.

In May 2024, Horbath released her first EP as a singer-songwriter, titled De Magia Imperfecta. The EP was produced by Latin Grammy winner Juan Carlos Pérez Soto.

== Discography ==
=== Extended plays ===
- De Magia Imperfecta (2024)

=== Singles ===
- "Sueña" (2022)
- "Florecer" (2022)

== Awards and nominations ==
- 2024: Nominated for Latin Grammys in the categories of Best Singer-Songwriter Album and Best New Artist.
- 2023: Nominated for Grammys and Latin Grammys as part of the album Beautiful Humans Vol. 1 by AleMor.
- 2018: Winner of the "Prodigy Scholarship" from the Latin Grammy Cultural Foundation.
- 2017: First place in the Jóvenes Intérpretes competition of the Banco de la República.
