= Cátia de França =

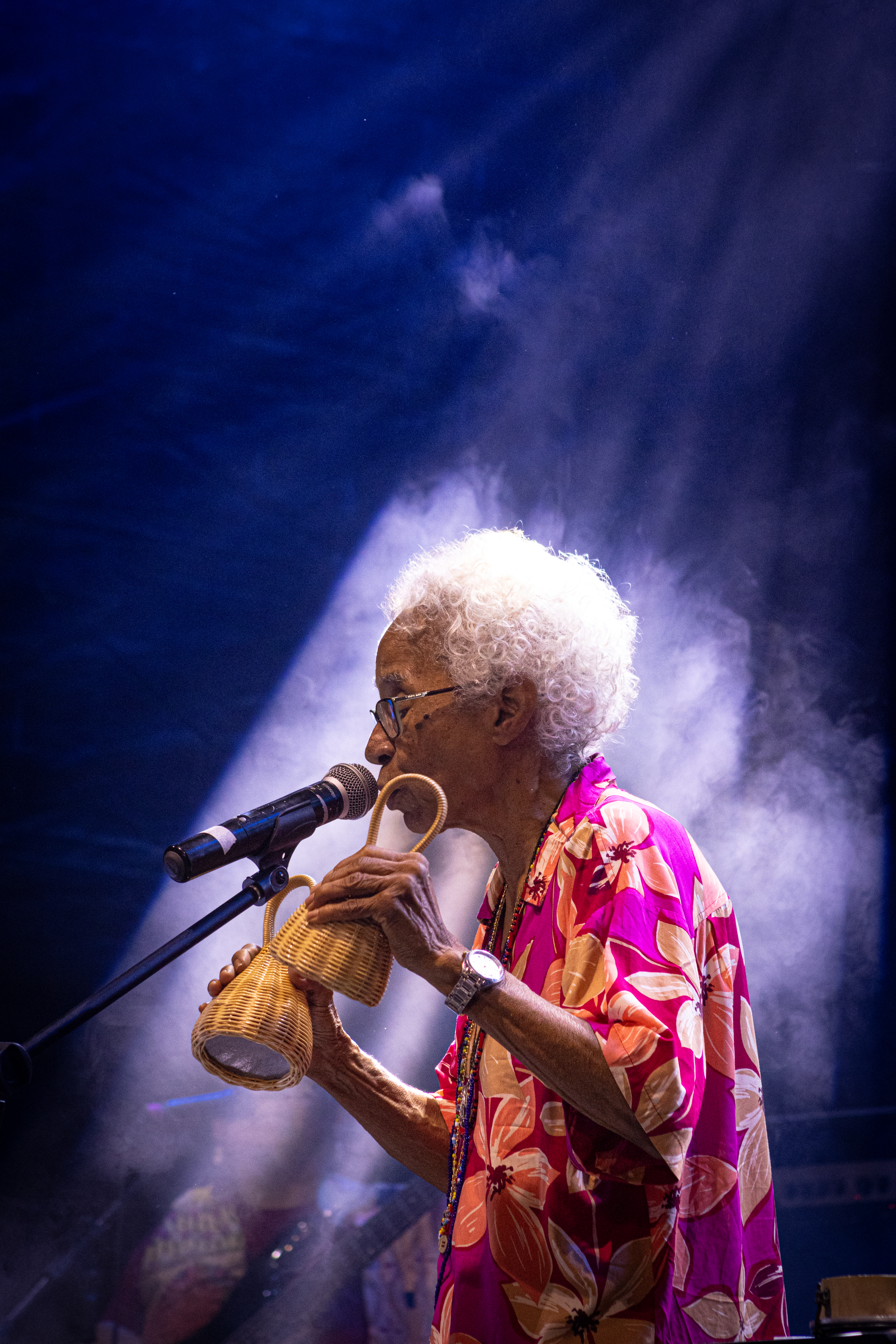
- Cátia de França, 2025

Background information
- Born: Catarina Maria de França Carneiro; November 13, 1947 (age 78); João Pessoa, Paraíba, Brazil
- Genres: Música popular brasileira
- Occupations: Singer-songwriter, writer
- Instruments: Voice, guitar
- Website: Cátia de França

Catarina Maria de França Carneiro, known as Cátia de França (born 13 February 1947) is a Brazilian singer-songwriter and writer. Her music draws inspiration from literature, referencing the works of Guimarães Rosa, José Lins do Rego, Manoel de Barros, and João Cabral de Melo Neto, but she also defines it as "world popular" because it includes references ranging from Northeastern Brazilian artists Luiz Gonzaga and Jackson do Pandeiro to Elvis Presley, the Beatles, and the Minas Gerais-based Clube da Esquina.

In 2023, she was one of ten personalities from the Brazilian artistic scene honored with the Milú Villela Award - Itaú Cultural 35 Years. She was nominated for a Latin Grammy in 2024 in the Best Rock or Alternative Music Album in Portuguese Language category, with "No Rastro de Catarina".

== Personal life ==
Cátia de França is openly homosexual. As she herself recounts, "until I was 15 years old I was afraid of going to hell, but I wore boots, had short hair, and wore western pants." She frequented the Bambu steakhouse in downtown João Pessoa, whose clientele included artists, journalists, and politicians, but also an LGBT audience. Cátia states that she "didn't wave a flag" (in the sense of not being an activist), but believed that "people had no doubt about my sexuality." She emphasizes that currently "there is still prejudice, but there is also greater awareness."

== Discography ==
- 20 Palavras ao redor do Sol (1979)
- Estilhaços (1980)
- Feliz demais (1985)
- Avatar (1998)
- Cátia de França canta Pedro Osmar (2005)
- No Bagaço da Cana / Um Brasil Adormecido (2012)
- Hóspede da Natureza (2016)
- No Rastro de Catarina (2024)
