= Música Para Abrir El Cielo =

2025 studio album by Maye

- Digital cover

Studio album by Maye
- Released: June 27, 2025
- Length: 34:48
- Languages: Spanish; English
- Labels: Pink Poetry; Warner Chappell Music

Singles from Música Para Abrir El Cielo
- 1. "Yo Me Consiento" Released: April 4, 2025; 2. "Peter Pan" Released: May 30, 2025; 3. "Lento" Released: June 27, 2025

Música Para Abrir El Cielo (transl. Music to Open the Sky or Music to Open Heaven) is the debut studio album by Venezuelan singer-songwriter Maye. It was released by Pink Poetry on June 27, 2025, and contains 11 tracks, including singles "Yo Me Consiento", "Peter Pan", and "Lento" featuring Rawayana.

== Background ==
Maye began working on the album with producers Mick Coogan and Scott Dittrich in 2022, starting with the song "Una Medalla". Later, she was introduced to Beto Montenegro of Rawayana who would feature on the single "Lento". Maye stated writing the lyrics to "Lento" with Rawayana was "challenging in a great way".

Maye stated the name of the album came from a conversation while buying a yoga mat, where the seller told Maye that her purpose in life was to "abrirle el cielo" (transl. "open the sky" or "open heaven") to many people.

== Release and promotion ==
On April 4, 2025, Maye released "Yo Me Consiento" as the first prerelease single of the album. On May 30, she released the second single "Peter Pan". On June 27, Maye released the album along with the third single, "Lento", which features Rawayana.

On July 11, Maye embarked her first headline U.S. tour, titled the Música Para Abrir El Cielo Tour. The tour was opened by her father Fernando Osorio who helped pen some of the album's tracks.

== Reception ==
The album was listed by Billboard as one of the best new Latin albums of its week of release. Luisa Calle of Billboard praised Maye's vocals, songwriting, and overall sound. E.R. Pulgar of Spin called Maye an "emerging force in Latin alternative music with an effortlessly bilingual sound" in response to the album's release.

== Track listing ==
Track listing for Música Para Abrir El Cielo
No.	Title	Lyrics	Music	Length
1.	"Open The Sky"	Scotty Dittrich; Maria Alejandra Osorio; Mick Coogan; Thom Bridges	maye; Coogan; Dittrich; Bridges	3:06
2.	"Yo Me Consiento"	Dittrich; M. Osorio; Coogan	maye; Dittrich; Coogan	2:29
3.	"Peter Pan"	Dittrich; M. Osorio; Coogan	maye; Coogan; Dittrich	3:09
4.	"Lento" (featuring Rawayana)	Dittrich; Alberto Montenegro; Andrés Story; M. Osorio; Coogan	maye; Coogan; Dittrich; Fofo Story	3:32
5.	"Versión de Mí"	Dittrich; M. Osorio; Coogan; Paul Omar Elkan Agyei	maye; Coogan; Dittrich; Elkan	3:41
6.	"Bailemos"	Fernando Belisario; Fernando Osorio; M. Osorio	maye; Pat Howard	2:08
7.	"Ella"	Dittrich; Eduardo Puche; M. Osorio; Coogan; Miguel Puche	maye; M. Puche; Dittrich; E. Puche; Coogan	2:17
8.	"Luna de Miel"	Belisario; F. Osorio; M. Osorio; Howard	maye; Belisario; Howard	3:38
9.	"Ángel"	Dittrich; M. Osorio; Coogan	maye; Coogan; Dittrich	3:05
10.	"Una Medalla"	Dittrich; M. Osorio; Coogan	maye; Coogan; Dittrich	2:45
11.	"Cowboy"	Dittrich; Linden Jay; M. Osorio; Coogan	maye; Coogan; Dittrich; Jay	4:52
Total length:				34:48

== Release history ==
Release history for Música Para Abrir El Cielo
Region	Date	Format	Label
Various	June 27, 2025	Digital download; streaming	Pink Poetry; Warner Chappell Music
