= Cacá Magalhães =

Cacá Magalhães (born Salvador, Bahia, Brazil) is a Brazilian pop musician and singer. She was nominated for the Best New Artist Award at the 2024 Latin Grammy Awards.

== Musical career ==
Magalhães first received popular attention for her singing in 2019 at age twelve when her cover of Nina Simone's "Feeling Good" went viral on Brazilian social media.

In May 2020 she appeared on the NBC reality show Little Big Shots which highlighted young singers from around the world.

In a 2020 interview, Cacá Magalhães named Brazilian singers and composers Cássia Eller, Frejat, Vitor Kley, Los hermanos, Liniker, Jhonny Hooker, and Raul Seixas as her biggest inspirations.

== Discography ==
- Só Sinto (2023) Sony Music Brasil
