= ¿Dónde es el after? =

Sixth studio album by Venezuelan band Rawayana

Studio album by Rawayana
- Released: January 1, 2026
- Length: 61:54
- Label: Brocoli Records

Rawayana chronology
Astropical (2025)	¿Dónde es el after? (2026)

¿Dónde es el after? is the sixth studio album by Venezuelan band Rawayana, released on January 1, 2026, by Brocoli Records and distributed by Rimas Entertainment. The album features 23 songs with guest appearances by Manuel Turizo, DannyLux, Elena Rose, Justin Quiles, Jowell & Randy, Magic Juan, Mazzarri, Carín León, Grupo Frontera, Servando & Florentino and Joaquina.

It was nominated for album of the year in the 2026 Latin Grammy Awards.

== Background and recording ==
The album incorporates elements of afrobeat, funk, urban contemporary music, Caribbean music, reggaetón, dembow beat, cumbia, merengue, Latin hip-hop, and traditional Venezuelan folk music. It was recorded over two to three years in Puerto Rico and Los Angeles. Edgar Barrera produced tracks such as "Como de sol a sol." The song "El after del after" includes a segment from the Venezuelan variety show El Show de Renny, broadcast in 1973, in which host Renny Ottolina said, "It is undoubtedly foolish to have space in your heart for bitterness, because a space is a space and if it's filled with bitterness, there's no room left for love." He added, "No group has a monopoly on the truth. When someone decides to align with one group, he effectively loses the truth that any other groups might possess."

== Album art ==
The phone number +1 (414) 261-2692 appears on the album cover. According to the Los Angeles Times, the number, when called, plays a fragment of a 1996 interview in which Venezuelan intellectual Arturo Uslar Pietri criticizes Venezuela's dependence on petroleum. Uslar Pietri says, “We don’t know how to put our house in order because we have to undertake a gigantic task as great as independence itself, which is to reduce the oil state, that monster that devoured the country, and create a space for a nation to emerge, to become the nation we failed to create with abundance."

== Track listing ==
No.	Title	Length
1.	"Si te pica es porque eres tú"	0:32
2.	"Se presta"	2:38
3.	"Inglés en Miami" (featuring Manuel Turizo)	3:22
4.	"Bendito"	2:34
5.	"Bienvenidos a la tierra" (featuring DannyLux)	2:52
6.	"Naguará" (featuring Elena Rose)	3:02
7.	"La noche que no había Uber"	2:43
8.	"Reyimiller"	3:22
9.	"Playa Pantaleta"	3:12
10.	"Mimir"	1:28
11.	"Qué rico PR!"	2:00
12.	"Coronando" (featuring Justin Quiles)	2:59
13.	"Domingo familiar" (featuring Jowell & Randy)	2:38
14.	"Soltero"	2:31
15.	"Conga"	1:30
16.	"Amor de contrabando" (featuring Magic Juan y Mazzarri)	4:15
17.	"Como de sol a sol" (featuring Carín León y Grupo Frontera)	2:02
18.	"El amor se ve" (featuring Servando & Florentino)	3:40
19.	"30K"	3:27
20.	"Cimarrón" (featuring Joaquina)	3:27
21.	"El after del after"	1:20
22.	"Tonada por ella"	3:41
23.	"Se vienen cositas"	2:39
Total length:		61:54
