= Pra Você, Ilza =

Studio album by Hermeto Pascoal
- Released: May 28, 2024
- Recorded: Araras, Rio de Janeiro, Brazil
- Studio: Rocinante Records
- Genres: Jazz fusion, progressive big band, samba jazz, experimental
- Length: 42:05
- Label: Rocinante
- Producer: Fábio Pascoal

Hermeto Pascoal chronology
Natureza Universal (2018)	Pra Você, Ilza (2024)

Pra Você, Ilza is a jazz album by Brazilian musician Hermeto Pascoal released on May 28, 2024. Released by Rocinante Records, the album is Hermeto's tribute to Ilza, the artist's wife, to whom he was married for over forty years. It was his last album released before his death in September 2025. In 2024, the album won a Latin Grammy Award for Best Latin Jazz Album.

== Background ==
Released on May 26, 2024, by Rocinante Records, the album Pra Você, Ilza by Brazilian multi-instrumentalist Hermeto Pascoal was released in two versions, one on vinyl containing ten tracks, and a digital version with three bonus tracks.

The work is a tribute by Hermeto to Ilza, the musician's wife, to whom he was married for forty-six years and with whom he had six children. Hermeto lived with her until her death in 2000 from pancreatic cancer.

According to music journalist Mauro Ferreira, in his blog on G1, the album cover photo, dated 1999, shows Hermeto with Ilza. In an interview with journalist Pedro Ibarra from the Correio Braziliense newspaper, Hermeto stated that he met Ilza in Recife and that much of his work is a tribute to her. Also in the interview, he stated that since Ilza's death, the musician has composed 190 songs dedicated to his wife and that he had to curate them to choose which songs would be included in the album.

The album was recorded in Araras, in the mountainous region of Rio de Janeiro. The album was released on the twenty-fourth anniversary of Ilza's death.

== Tracks ==
Side A
No.	Title	Length
1.	"Inspirando fundo"	3:05
2.	"Conversação"	4:51
3.	"Porto da Madeira"	2:46
4.	"Do Rio para Recife"	5:17
5.	"Seus lindos olhos"	4:50
Total length:		20:49

Side B
No.	Title	Length
1.	"Passeando pelo jardim"	5:33
2.	"Sentir é muito bom"	3:34
3.	"Recordações de Recife"	4:04
4.	"Sol de Recife"	4:32
5.	"Pra você, Ilza"	3:33
Total length:		21:16

Digital album bonus tracks
No.	Title	Length
1.	"Voltando para Casa"	2:23
2.	"Na feira do Jabour"	8:06
3.	"No topo do morro de Aracajú"	2:54
Total length:		14:05

== Release ==
Released on May 28, 2024, the album was released on CD, LP, and streaming platforms.

== Reception ==
=== Critical ===
Sidney Molina, from the São Paulo newspaper Folha de S.Paulo, gave it five stars—the highest rating adopted by the newspaper—and added that: "the themes played in unison are not yet, of course, improvisations, but the result of writing in which virtuosity is already implicit, both in the rhythmic twists and turns and in the fast tempo." Laís Franklin, from Bravo! magazine, praised the album and recommended it: "This is one of those albums that deserves to be listened to in its entirety, without rushing. An invitation to creative immersion."

Katchie Cartwright, from the US website All About Jazz, rated the album four and a half stars out of five, saying that it is "heartfelt, a labor of love, with multifaceted performances, in a loving tribute to a fruitful life and a long marriage." Raul da Gama, from the Canadian website Latin Jazz Network, praised the work and commented: "As in other recordings, in Pra Você, Ilza, Mr. Pascoal's music inexorably intertwines melody, harmony, and rhythm."

=== Awards ===
In 2024, the album was nominated for a Latin Grammy in the category of Best Latin Jazz Album. At a ceremony held at the Kaseya Center in Miami, United States, the album won the award.

The following year, the work was nominated for the 2025 Brazilian Music Award in the category 'instrumental - new release'. At the award ceremony held at the Municipal Theater of Rio de Janeiro, in the city of Rio de Janeiro, the album was surpassed by the work Y'Y by musician Amaro Freitas.

It was included in the list of 50 best albums of 2024 by the São Paulo Art Critics Association.

Awards and nominations
Year	Award	Category	Event location	Result	Ref.
2024	Latin Grammy Awards	Latin Grammy Award for Best Latin Jazz/Jazz Album	Kaseya Center, Miami, Florida, United States	Won	
2025	Brazilian Music Award	Instrumental – Release	Theatro Municipal do Rio de Janeiro, Rio de Janeiro, Rio de Janeiro, Brazil	Nominated	

== Personnel ==
The following musicians worked on the album:

- Hermeto Pascoal: blowing horn, glass of water, kettle, PVC pipe, bass flute, melodica, acoustic piano, and keyboards
- Ajurinã Zwarg: drums and percussion
- André Marques: acoustic piano and keyboards
- Fábio Pascoal: percussion
- Itiberê Zwarg: electric bass and tuba
- Jota P.: soprano saxophone, alto saxophone, tenor saxophone, flute, and piccolo
