= Bachatica =

Single by Leslie Grace
- Released: September 30, 2021
- Genre: Bachata
- Length: 3:16
- Label: Sony Music Latin
- Songwriters: Leon Viviana Baptista; Leslie Grace Martinez; Maye Osorio; Edwin Perez

Leslie Grace singles chronology
"Conga" (2021)	"Bachatica" (2021)	"Un Buen Día" (2022)

Music video
- "Bachatica" on YouTube

"Bachatica" ("Little Bachata") is a song recorded by American singer and actress Leslie Grace. it was released on September 30, 2021, by Sony Music Latin. It was her first bachata since 2015 due to the fact that she released singles for other genres from 2016 to 2021. This was also her first solo song since 2016.

== Music video ==
The music video was released on the same day. It is inspired by the 1920s as it is the theme of the video.

== Charts ==
Chart (2021)	Peak position
US Tropical Airplay (Billboard)	10
