= Quinteto Villa-Lobos =

Brazilian wind quintet

Quinteto Villa-Lobos is a Brazilian wind quintet, founded in 1962 with the intention of popularizing Brazilian chamber music, featuring the diverse compositions of Heitor Villa-Lobos. The founding original quintet were Celso Woltzenlogel, Paolo Nardi, Wilfried Berk, Carlos Gomes de Oliveira, and Airton Lima Barbosa. The Quinteto Villa-Lobos has celebrated over 50 years of performances and recordings, replenishing its membership with instrumentalists that are active as soloists in Brazil and internationally, featuring flute, oboe, clarinet, horn and bassoon.

== History ==
Quinteto Villa-Lobos has played in towns and cities across Brazil. In 1987, they opened the commemorations for the Unesco "Year of Villa-Lobos" in Paris. In July 2010, the ensemble played with Egberto Gismonti in "Tocar la Vida" festival, in Argentina.

In 2001, and again in 2009, the ensemble received the Carlos Gomes Award, as the best Brazilian chamber group, from the São Paulo state government.

In March 2002, the quintet celebrated its 40th anniversary with a series of concerts entitled "Quinteto Villa-Lobos – 40 years of Brazilian Music", in the Centro Cultural Banco do Brasil, Rio de Janeiro. That same year it participated in the Projeto Sonora Brasil – SESC, playing in 32 Brazilian cities.

In 2006, it was one of the winners of the project "Concert Music Circulation", provided by CEMUS-Funarte and in the same year the quintet played in the "Culture Cup" in Berlin, Germany.

The group participated in the 2008 project "Oi apresenta: Quinteto Villa-Lobos no Rio de Janeiro."

In 2009, the quintet played in several African countries and also in a festival in honoring Villa-Lobos in the Radio-France, Paris.

In 2012, the ensemble celebrated its 50th anniversary by releasing a DVD and Blu-ray of a concert series recorded at venues in Rio de Janeiro.

== Discography ==
- Quinteto Villa-Lobos (1966) Forma LP
- Reencontro. Silvinha Telles, Edu Lobo, Tamba Trio e Quinteto Villa-Lobos" (1966) LP
- Vanguarda. Quinteto Villa-Lobos & Luizinho Eça
- Quinteto Villa-Lobos interpreta (1977) Marcus Pereira" LP, CD
- Quinteto Villa-Lobos, with works by Mário Tavares, Radamés Gnattali e Ernst Widmer (1979) Funarte LP
- O grande palhaço – soundtrack of the film with the same name (1979) Coomusa LP
- Airton Lima Barbosa (1981) CBS LP
- Quinteto em forma de choros (2000) Kuarup CD
- Fronteiras (2000) RioArte Digital CD
- Quinteto Villa-Lobos convida (2002) RioArte CD
- Um Sopro Novo (2006) Radio MEC CD
- Villa-Lobos – um clássico popular (2009) Kalamata CD

== See also ==
- Choro
