= Astropical =

Studio album by Astropical
- Released: March 7, 2025
- Length: 36:34
- Label: Sony Latin
- Producers: Édgar Barrera; Casta; José Castillo; Brandon Cores; Fux Beat; IzyBeats; JenneJenne; Lil Einyel; Mazzarri; Orteez; Fofo Story; Rob Smyles

Singles from Astropical
- 1. "Me Pasa (Piscis)" Released: January 31, 2025; 2. "Corazón Adentro (Escorpio)" Released: February 7, 2025; 3. "Noche en Caracas (Tauro)" Released: February 7, 2025

Astropical is the debut studio album by South American supergroup Astropical. It was released on March 7, 2025, by Sony Music Latin. The album was preceded by three singles: "Me Pasa (Piscis)", "Una Noche en Caracas (Tauro)", and "Corazón Adentro (Escorpio)".

== Background ==
Colombian band Bomba Estéreo members Li Saumet and José Castillo, and Venezuelan band Rawayana members Beto Montenegro and Andrés Story collaborated to form the supergroup Astropical when Saumet and Montenegro worked together to create "Me Pasa (Piscis)", the first single of the album released in January 2025. Consisting of twelve tracks, Astropical incorporates elements of African music, tropical music, and electronic dance music, and centers on the themes of femininity, eros, spirituality, club culture, and astrology.

== Reception ==
Professional ratings
Review scores
Source	Rating
AllMusic	4/5 stars

AllMusic wrote in its review about the album, stating "Astropical isn't just a sparkling debut, it's a remarkably hip, optimistically ecstatic, and holistic work that can soundtrack the dancefloor, spring and summer, and all major life events." NPR described it as "a euphoric exploration of South America's coastal sounds."

== Track listing ==
No.	Title	Lyrics	Music	Producer(s)	Length
1.	"Brinca (Acuario)"	Alberto Montenegro Delgado; Liliana Saumet Avila; Sebastian Zapata	Montenegro; Saumet; Andrés Story; Andron Cross; Kristian Jensen; Sylvester Løkken; Zapata	Fofo Story; IzyBeats; JenneJenne; Rob Smyles	3:39
2.	"Siento (Virgo)"	Saumet; Édgar Barrera; Manuel Lorente Freire	José Castillo; Montenegro; Saumet; Story	Fofo Story; Castillo; Casta; Barrera	2:39
3.	"Me Pasa (Piscis)"	Montenegro; Saumet	Montenegro; Saumet; Story; Angel Arevalo; Cross; Zapata	Fofo Story; IzyBeats; Liol Einyel; Bassto^{[c]}	3:21
4.	"Otro Nivel (Capricornio)"	Montenegro; Saumet; Lorente	Castillo; Montenegro; Saumet; Story; Lorente; Hector Mazzarri; César Santiago Cajigas	Fofo Story; Castillo; Fux Beat; Mazzarri	2:34
5.	"Una Noche en Caracas (Tauro)"	Montenegro; Saumet	Castillo; Montenegro; Saumet; Story; Brandon Cores	Fofo Story; Castillo; Cores	2:48
6.	"Happy (Libra)"	Montenegro; Saumet; Edgardo Franco	Montenegro; Saumet; Story; Franco	Fofo Story	3:59
7.	"Calentita (Aries)"	Montenegro; Saumet	Montenegro; Saumet; Story; Andres Gavillan Batista; Ismael Ortiz Bayron; Santiago	Fofo Story; Casta; IzyBeats; Orteez	2:58
8.	"El Lobo (Cáncer)"	Montenegro; Saumet; Carlos Santander; Santiago	Montenegro; Saumet; Story; Santander; Santiago	Fofo Story; Fux Beat	3:06
9.	"Llegó el Verano (Sagitario)"	Montenegro; Saumet	Castillo; Montenegro; Saumet; Jaime Alzate; Pacho Carnaval; Luís Gómez Castaño	Fofo Story; Castillo; Casta	2:45
10.	"Quién Me Mandó (Géminis)"	Montenegro; Saumet; Alejandro Sanz	Montenegro; Saumet; Story; Sanz	Fofo Story	2:05
11.	"Corazón Adentro (Escorpio)"	Montenegro; Saumet	Montenegro; Saumet; Story; Cross; Gómez; Jensen; Løkken	Fofo Story; Casta; IzyBeats	2:56
12.	"Fogata (Leo)"	Montenegro; Saumet	Castillo; Montenegro; Saumet; Story; Cross	Fofo Story; Castillo; IzyBeats	3:40
Total length:					36:34

Note

- ^{^[c]} signifies a co-producer.

== Personnel ==
Credits adapted from Tidal.

=== Astropical ===
- José Castillo – performance
- Beto Montenegro – performance
- Li Saumet – performance
- Andrés "Fofo" Story – performance, engineering

=== Technical ===
- Alex de Turk – mastering
- Rian Lewis – mixing
- Felipe Trujillo – engineering
- César Sánchez – engineering (tracks 1, 3, 6)
- Carlos Imperatori – engineering (tracks 1, 5, 6, 11)
- César Santiago Cajigas – engineering (tracks 5, 7)
