= Daymé Arocena =

Cuban jazz singer

Daymé Arocena in concert, Philadelphia 2016

Daymé Arocena (born January 1992) is an Afro-Cuban jazz singer from Havana, who has been described as Cuba's "finest young female singer." She won the 2015 Juno Award for the best jazz album, as a member of the jazz band Maqueque performing with Canadian musician Jane Bunnett. For 2026 Grammy Awards, she received a nomination for the album The Original Influencers: Dizzy, Chano & Chico Arturo O'Farrill & The Afro Latin Jazz Orchestra in the Best Latin Jazz Album category.

Arocena is on National Public Radio's (NPR) list of 50 favourite albums of 2015, with the album Nueva Era. Describing Arocena's voice, NPR host Felix Contreras called her "a cross between Celia Cruz and Aretha Franklin," saying that Arocena's name "deserve[d] to be alongside those two legendary voices."

Arocena began performing semi-professionally when she was eight years old; at the age of 14, she became the lead singer of the band Los Primos. She is considered a musical prodigy, and is a trained composer, arranger, choir director, and band leader, in addition to being a singer.

== Afro-Diasporic connections ==
Arocena is devoted to the religion of Santería, an Afro-Cuban religion, in which she has been a santera for over a decade. Through her work she embraces her religious identity like that of her music, album structures, cover art, and personal looks. She also incorporates the Yoruba language, traditional Santería prayers, and references to Orishas into her lyrics, as an aim to portray the faith in a deeper and empowering manner.

Arocena frequently dresses entirely in white and wears a white head wrap, which reflects the traditional attire of being a Santería initiate. Arocena specifically honors Yemayá, who she regularly consults for guidance within her songwriting and more personal life. By getting closer to Afro-descendant spirituality, Arocena sees it as a way to reconnect with her ancestors and understand her own roots.

== Meaning behind music ==
Arocena uses her music as a platform to describe the concept of “Cubanism” by showcasing the island's roots to the African Diaspora. Her work represents cultural preservation, pushing back against traditional viewpoints that have oppressed Black Cubans throughout history. Arocena draws influence and blends the historical traditions of Buena vista Social Club and Afro-Cuban jazz bands like Irakeré. She incorporates elements of jazz, pop, R&B, neo-soul, salsa, and cha-cha-chá, alongside the classical music influence she gets from her Russian-style music education that she received in Cuba. Her songwriting touches upon the themes of motherhood, men, heat, and body confidence.

== Discography ==
Studio Albums

- Nueva Era (2015)
- One Takes (2016)
- Cubafonía (2017)
- Sonocardiogram (2019)
- Alkemi (2024)
