= Mariana Vega =

- Born: 11 February 1985 (age 41); Caracas, Venezuela
- Education: University of Toronto
- Occupation: Singer-songwriter
- Spouse: Sergio Pizzolante
- Awards: Latin Grammy (2014)
- Musical career
- Genres: Pop rock, Latin ballad, Folk
- Instruments: Guitar, voice
- Labels: Sonográfica, Warner Music, PYE Records/Empire Distribution
- Website: www.marianavega.com

Mariana Vega (born 11 February 1985) is a Venezuelan singer-songwriter, successful in her native country and Mexico, and the winner of the Latin Grammy for Best New Artist in 2014.

== Biography ==
Mariana Vega was born in Caracas, the youngest of four siblings. She studied at the Emil Friedman School, and at age 15 moved to Toronto, where at 16 she began to develop her musical career.

Along with her guitar, she began to compose at the age of 19. She graduated from the University of Toronto with a degree in Industrial Relations and Psychology, and decided to dedicate herself fully to music, because she had also taken music classes there, guiding her into this profession. She first appeared at local venues, and then larger rooms.

She visited her native land to attend the wedding of a cousin, and it was there that a record executive listened to her, accompanied by an electric guitar, and asked for a demo, for his later musical production.

== Artistic career ==
=== 2008–2011: EPs, success in Venezuela, and first album ===
Mariana Vega released her EP Háblame through the Venezuelan label Sonográfica in 2008. Produced by Sebastián Krys and Luis Romero, this reached platinum record status in her native Venezuela. From this first EP, three #1 singles were released: "Háblame", "No me queda nada", and "Ni tú ni nadie".

That same year, Vega received the 2008 Pop Artist of the Year award given by the Record Report organization, for being the artist with the most singles in the top 10 and having the most talked-about album of the year in her country.

In 2010 she traveled to Mexico, signed with Warner Music, and recorded her first complete album, titled Mariana Vega. Produced by Aureo Baqueiro, this eponymous disc contained the single "Contigo" and a new version of "No me queda nada".

During 2011, Vega released two songs to the radio in Venezuela, "Te Segué" and "Pregúntale por mi".

=== 2012-present: Mi burbuja, Te busco, and Latin Grammy ===
In 2013, Mariana Vega released her second studio album entitled Mi burbuja, from which came the singles "Mi burbuja" and "De tu voz". The record was recorded in Argentina this time, with producer Cachorro López.

In 2014, she released a second EP, Te Busco, on which she collaborated with Los Amigos Invisibles and Oscar D'León and covered some of her previous songs. That same year she received the Latin Grammy for Best New Artist in Las Vegas.

== Personal life ==
Mariana Vega is married to Sergio Pizzolante, a media consultant for TV, film, and entertainment companies.

== Discography ==
=== Studio albums ===
- 2010: Mariana Vega
- 2013: Mi Burbuja

=== EPs ===
- 2008: Háblame
- 2014: Te Busco

=== Singles ===
- "Háblame"
- "No me queda nada"
- "Lejos de reconocer"
- "Ni tú ni nadie"
- "Contigo"
- "No me queda nada (2010 version)"
- "Háblame (2010 version)"
- "Mi burbuja"
- "De tu voz"
- "Te seguiré" (with Los Amigos Invisibles)
- "Te busco" (with Oscar D'León)
- "Medicinal" (with Ale Sergi)
- "Cámara Lenta"
- "La Marea"

== Awards ==
| Year | Nominated work | Award | Category | Result |
|---|---|---|---|---|
| 2014 | Mi Burbuja | 15th Latin Grammy Awards | Best New Artist | Winner |
