= Rawayana =

Venezuelan musical group

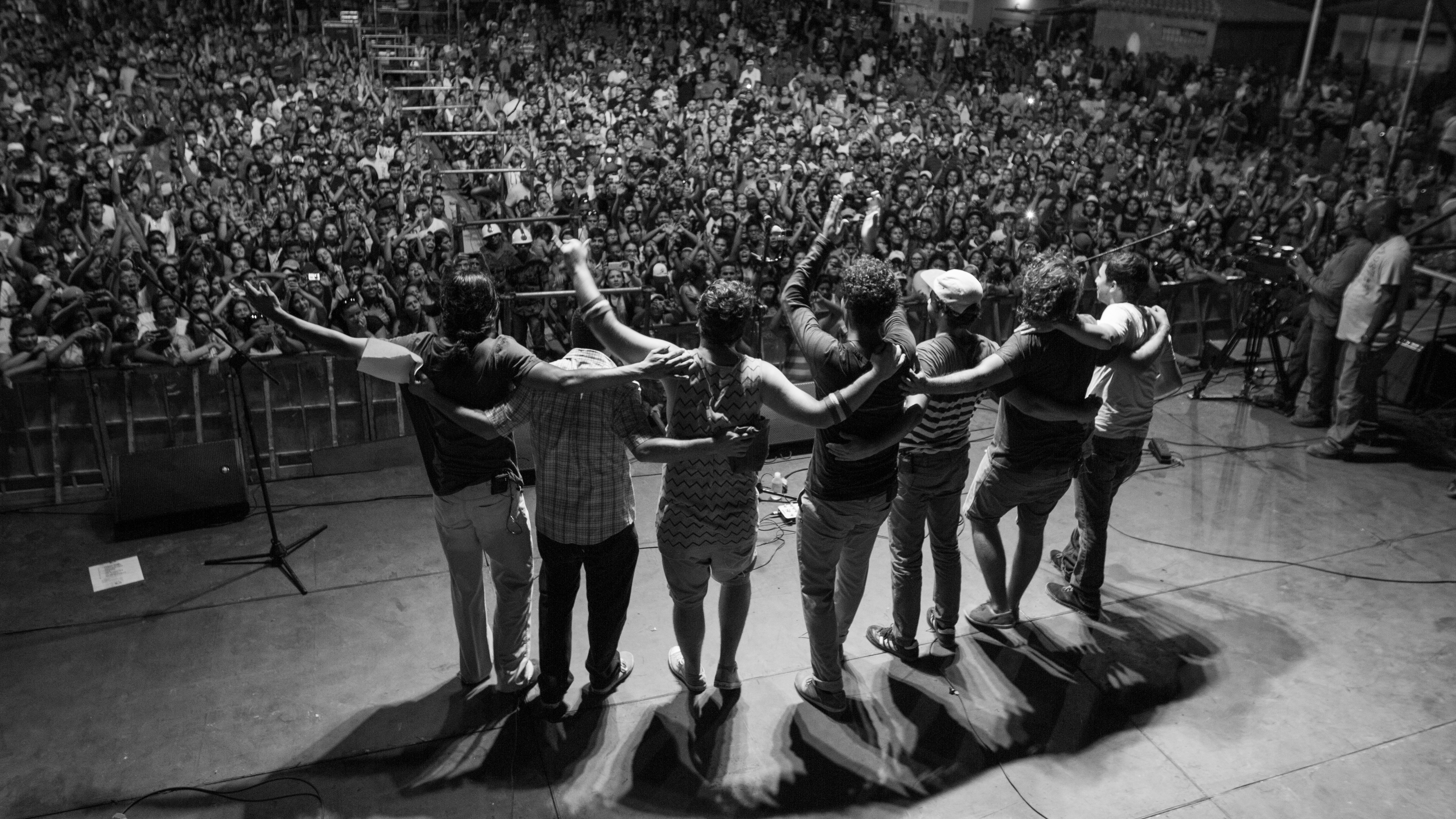
- Rawayana performing live in Punto Fijo, Venezuela

Background information
- Origin: Caracas, Venezuela
- Genres: Latin alternative; psychedelic pop; reggae; funk
- Years active: 2007–present
- Label: Broccoli Records
- Members: Alberto "Beto" Montenegro; Antonio "Tony" Casas; Andrés "Fofo" Story; Alejandro "Abeja" Abeijón
- Past members: Rodrigo Michelangeli
- Website: www.rawayana.com (in Spanish)

Rawayana is a Venezuelan band formed in Caracas in 2007. The group's music combines a variety of musical genres including reggae, psychedelic, electronic, funk and salsa, and the members describe their style as "trippy pop". The band consists of Alberto "Beto" Montenegro, Antonio "Tony" Casas, Andrés "Fofo" Story and Alejandro "Abeja" Abeijón.

The band has released 5 studio albums and has collaborated with artists such as Parcels, Danny Ocean, Natalia Lafourcade, Bomba Estéreo, Monsieur Periné and Los Amigos Invisibles. They have performed at festivals such as Coachella and Lollapalooza and are the recipients of two Latin Grammys and a Grammy.

== History ==
After the release of the album Trippy Caribbean in 2016, the band was nominated for Best New Artist at the 18th Annual Latin Grammy Awards, losing to Dominican musician Vicente García. To promote the album, the band embarked on a tour of major cities in Latin America and the United States, and released a music video for the song "Funky Fiesta" featuring Jose Luis Pardo of Los Amigos Invisibles.

Rawayana's 2021 album Cuando los Acéfalos Predominan discusses the crisis in Venezuela in both its lyrical content as well as the album's accompanying music videos. The album featured Los Amigos Invisibles, Cheo Pardo, and Akapellah, and was released in conjunction with an art installation in Mexico City. In the words of lead singer Montenegro, the satirical music video for the song "Into You", which parodies Latin American talk shows, served as a way to "[call] forth major 'entertainers' in the industry not to stay silent about the world’s problems".

On September 19, 2023, the band performed a Tiny Desk Concert for NPR to promote their album ¿Quién trae las cornetas?, which was officially released two days later on September 21. The Tiny Desk performance further propelled the band's international popularity, accumulating over 11 million views. In 2024, the band embarked on the ¿Quién trae las cornetas? World Tour, performing across Europe, North America and Latin America.

In 2024, Rawayana's song "Feriado" won Best Pop Song at the 25th Annual Latin Grammy Awards. In early 2025, their album ¿Quién Trae las Cornetas? won the 2025 Grammy for Best Latin Rock or Alternative Album.

In early 2024, Bomba Estereo frontman Li Saumet sent a track to the band with the intention of collaborating; what was originally supposed to be an EP ended up becoming a full album under the name Astropical, released on March 7, 2025. The supergroup has multiple US dates planned for mid 2025, their first live show being in Vive Latino 2025 in Mexico City.

In June 2025, member Beto featured on Maye's debut album Música Para Abrir El Cielo for its single "Lento".. “In November, Rawayana — together with Venezuelan rapper Akapellah — won the Latin Grammy Award for Best Latin Electronic Music Performance for their song ‘Veneka’.

In October 2025, Nathy Peluso composed the song "Malportada", featuring Rawayana.

On 1 January 2026, Rawayana released their new album ¿Dónde Es El After? which features Venezuelan artists like Elena Rose, Servando & Florentino and Joaquina. The cover includes an easter egg leading to a speech of Venezuelan writer Arturo Uslar Pietri. In their opening track "Si Te Pica Es Porque Eres Tú", they open with the lyrics “Un feliz año te desea Rawa, y que por fin los hijueputas ya se vayan,” (Rawa wishes you a happy New Year, and may those sons of bitches finally leave"), in reference to the Nicolás Maduro government. Two days later, the United States intervened in Venezuela and captured Maduro which produced a popular response to Rawayana in YouTube. Users drew parallels between the lyrics and the events in Venezuela.

== Cancelled tour ==
The song "Veneka" was criticized by the Venezuelan president Nicolás Maduro, which forced Rawayana to cancel their tour through Venezuela in 2024/2025.

== Members ==
=== Official members ===
- Alberto "Beto" Montenegro (vocals, guitar) (2007-present)
- Antonio "Tony" Casas (bass, synth) (2007-present)
- Andrés "Fofo" Story (drums, percussion, guitar) (2011-present)
- Alejandro "Abeja" Abeijón (guitar, synth) (2007-present)

=== Current touring members ===
- Orestes Gómez (percussion, synths, samples) (2023-present)

== Discography ==
=== Studio albums ===
Title	Details
Licencia Para Ser Libre	Released: March 30, 2011; Label: Digital Pressure, Peermusic Venezuela
Rawayanaland	Released: May 19, 2013; Label: Brocoli Records
Trippy Caribbean	Released: October 7, 2016; Label: Brocoli Records
Cuando los Acéfalos Predominan	Released: February 5, 2021; Label: Brocoli Records
¿Quién Trae las Cornetas?	Released: September 21, 2023; Label: Brocoli Records
¿Dónde es el after?	Released: January 1, 2026; Label: Brocoli Records

=== Collaborative albums ===
Title	Details
Astropical with Bomba Estéreo	Released: March 7, 2025; Label: Sony Music Latin, Brocoli Records, Elegancia Tropical

=== As lead artist ===
Title	Year	Certifications	Album
"Me Pasa (Piscis)" with Bomba Estéreo	2025	RIAA: Gold(Latin)	Astropical
"Inglés en Miami" with Manuel Turizo	2026		

== Awards and nominations ==
Award	Year	Recipient(s) and nominee(s)	Category	Result	Ref.
Grammy Awards	2025	¿Quién Trae las Cornetas?	Best Latin Rock or Alternative Album	Won	
Latin Grammy Awards	2024	"Feriado"	Best Pop Song	Won	
Latin Grammy Awards	2025	"Veneka"	Best Latin Electronic Music Performance	Won	
Latin Grammy Awards	2025	"Venga Lo Que Venga" (with Fonseca)	Best Tropical Song	Nominated	
Latin Grammy Awards	2026	¿Dónde es el after?	Album of the Year	Nominated	
Premios Juventud	2025	Themselves	Favorite Group or Duo of The Year	Nominated	
Premios Juventud	2025	"La Culpa" (with Kany García)	Tropical Mix	Nominated	
Premios Juventud	2025	Astropical (with Bomba Estéreo)	Best Tropical Album	Nominated	
