= AleMor =

Colombian singer and songwriter

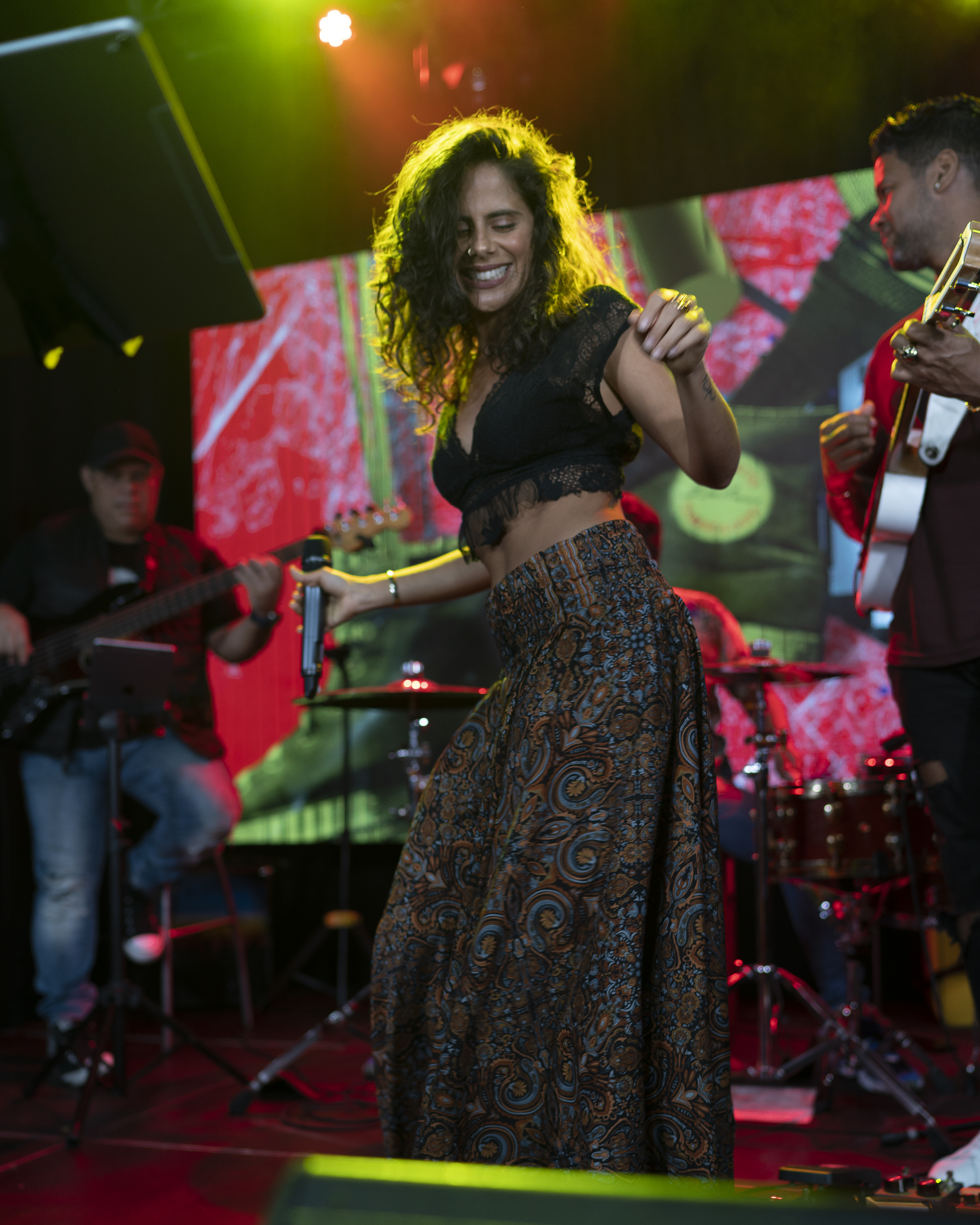
- Born: Alejandra Mor Tatis; Bogotá, Colombia
- Citizenship: Colombia; United States
- Occupations: Singer; songwriter; composer; musician
- Years active: 2019–present
- Musical career
- Instruments: Vocal; Mouth trumpet
- Labels: Wizzmor, Inc.
- Website: alemormusic.com

Alejandra Mor Tatis, known professionally as AleMor, is a Colombian-American musician, singer, and composer. Her musical style includes genres such as pop, latin alternative, rock, bolero, R&B, soul, neo-soul, and hip hop.

In 2021, AleMor released her debut extended play (EP) titled Alemorología, which was nominated for the 2021 Latin Grammy Awards in the category of Best Singer-Songwriter Album.

In 2023, AleMor released her first album, Beautiful Humans Vol. 1, which was nominated, this time in Category 5 for Best Latin Pop Album at the 2023 Latin Grammy Awards., Spain.

== Early life ==
AleMor was born in Bogotá, Colombia At the age of 12, her family relocated to Miami, Florida in the US.

== Music career ==
Between 2019 and 2020, AleMor participated in "La Voz US", a singing competition.

In 2021, AleMor independently released her debut album, titled Alemorología. This received a Latin Grammy nomination in the Best Singer-Songwriter Album category.

In May 2023, AleMor released her second album, Beautiful Humans Vol. 1, produced by Juan Carlos Pérez Soto and Bruno Romano. The album received a nomination Category 5 for Best Pop Vocal Album at the 2023 Latin Grammy Awards.

== Discography ==
=== Studio albums ===
  - 2021: Alemorología
  - 2023: Beautiful Humans Vol. 1

== Awards and nominations ==
=== Grammy Awards ===
AleMor has received her first nomination at Grammy Award nominations by the National Academy of Recording Arts and Sciences to recognize outstanding achievement in the music industry.

Year	Nominee / work	Award	Result
2023	Beautiful Humans, Vol. 1	Grammy Award for Best Latin Pop Album	Nominated

=== Latin Grammy Awards ===
AleMor has received two Latin Grammy Award nominations by the Latin Academy of Recording Arts & Sciences to recognize outstanding achievement in the music industry.

Year	Nominee / work	Award	Result
2021	Alemorología	Best Singer-Songwriter Album	Nominated
2023	Beautiful Humans Vol. 1	Best Pop Vocal Album	Nominated
