= List of Billboard Hot Latin Songs and Latin Airplay number ones of 2026 =

The Billboard Hot Latin Songs and Latin Airplay are charts that rank the best-performing Latin songs in the United States and are both published weekly by Billboard magazine. The Hot Latin Songs chart ranks the best-performing Spanish-language songs in the country based on digital downloads, streaming, and airplay from all radio stations. The Latin Airplay chart ranks the most-played songs on Spanish-language radio stations in the United States regardless of genre or language.

== Chart history ==
Chart history
Issue date	Hot Latin Songs			Latin Airplay		
Issue date	Title	Artist(s)	Ref.	Title	Artist(s)	Ref.
January 3	"DTMF"	Bad Bunny		"Perfumito Nuevo"	Bad Bunny and RaiNao	
January 10	"DTMF"	Bad Bunny		"Dem Bow"	Natti Natasha and Nando Boom	
January 17	"DTMF"	Bad Bunny		"Bzrp Music Sessions, Vol. 0/66"	Bizarrap and Daddy Yankee	
January 24	"DTMF"	Bad Bunny		"Lokita Por Mí"	Romeo Santos and Prince Royce	
January 31	"Baile Inolvidable"	Bad Bunny		"Coleccionando Heridas"	Karol G and Marco Antonio Solís	
February 7	"Baile Inolvidable"	Bad Bunny		"No Capea"	Xavi and Grupo Frontera	
February 14	"DTMF"	Bad Bunny		"Canción Para Regresar"	Sebastián Yatra, Lucho RK, Belinda and Gente de Zona	
February 21	"DTMF"	Bad Bunny		"Coleccionando Heridas"	Karol G and Marco Antonio Solís	
February 28	"DTMF"	Bad Bunny		"Corazón"	Danny Ocean	
March 7	"DTMF"	Bad Bunny		"Lokita Por Mí"	Romeo Santos and Prince Royce	
March 14	"DTMF"	Bad Bunny		"La Morrita"	Xavi and Carín León	
March 21	"DTMF"	Bad Bunny		"Si Te Vas"	J Balvin and Jay Wheeler	
March 28	"DTMF"	Bad Bunny		"Me Enamoré Solo"	Calibre 50	
April 4	"DTMF"	Bad Bunny		"Enemigos"	Ozuna, Beéle and Ovy on the Drums	
April 11	"DTMF"	Bad Bunny		"La Villa"	Ryan Castro, Kapo and Gangsta	
April 18	"DTMF"	Bad Bunny		"Como en el Idilio"	Marc Anthony and Nathy Peluso	
April 25	"DTMF"	Bad Bunny		"Cambiaré"	Luis Fonsi and Feid	
May 2	"DTMF"	Bad Bunny		"1+1"	Maluma and Kany García	
May 9	"DTMF"	Bad Bunny		"Dardos"	Romeo Santos and Prince Royce	
May 16	"DTMF"	Bad Bunny		"Dardos"	Romeo Santos and Prince Royce	
May 23	"DTMF"	Bad Bunny		"Inglés En Miami"	Rawayana and Manuel Turizo	
May 30	"DTMF"	Bad Bunny		"Te Dedico"	Carlos Vives	
June 6	"DTMF"	Bad Bunny		"Me Voy a La Chingada"	Yandel and Xavi	
June 13	"DTMF"	Bad Bunny		"Hoy Se Guaya"	Arcángel	
June 20	"DTMF"	Bad Bunny		"Tu Cárcel"	Morat	
June 27	"DTMF"	Bad Bunny		"Una Aventura"	Ozuna	
July 4	"DTMF"	Bad Bunny		"Una Aventura"	Ozuna	
July 11	"DTMF"	Bad Bunny		"Echo"	Daddy Yankee and Shenseea	
July 18	"DTMF"	Bad Bunny		"5 Estrellas (W Sound 23)"	W Sound, Myke Towers and Ovy on the Drums	
July 25	"DTMF"	Bad Bunny		"Dai Dai"	Shakira and Burna Boy	
August 1	"DTMF"	Bad Bunny		"Yapaqué"	Farruko, Greeicy and Steve Aoki	
August 8	"DTMF"	Bad Bunny		"Noche Perfecta"	Calle 24 and Fuerza Regida	
August 15	"DTMF"	Bad Bunny		"Caducaste"	Zion and Chencho Corleone	
August 22	"Ahí"	Karol G and Drake		"Dosis"	Xavi	
August 29	"Bby Wow"	Karol G with Judeline and Rusowsky		"De Lejitos"	Jay Wheeler	
September 5	"Bby Wow"	Karol G with Judeline and Rusowsky		"Polaroid"	Eladio Carrión	
September 12	"Bby Wow"	Karol G with Judeline and Rusowsky		"De Lejitos"	Jay Wheeler	
September 19	"Bby Wow"	Karol G with Judeline and Rusowsky		"Chévere"	Aria Vega and Ryan Castro	
September 26	"Bby Wow"	Karol G with Judeline and Rusowsky		"Ay! San Miguel"	Romeo Santos and Prince Royce	
October 3	"Bby Wow"	Karol G with Judeline and Rusowsky		"Para Que Seas Feliz"	Ricardo Montaner	
October 10	"Bby Wow"	Karol G with Judeline and Rusowsky		"Koko"	Omar Courtz	
October 17	"Bby Wow"	Karol G with Judeline and Rusowsky		"Bby Wow"	Karol G with Judeline and Rusowsky	
October 24	"Bby Wow"	Karol G with Judeline and Rusowsky		"Bby Wow"	Karol G with Judeline and Rusowsky	
October 31	"Bby Wow"	Karol G with Judeline and Rusowsky		"Ahí"	Karol G with Drake	
November 7	"Bby Wow"	Karol G with Judeline and Rusowsky		"Bby Wow"	Karol G with Judeline and Rusowsky	
November 14	"Bby Wow"	Karol G with Judeline and Rusowsky		"Bby Wow"	Karol G with Judeline and Rusowsky	
November 21	"Bby Wow"	Karol G with Judeline and Rusowsky		"Bby Wow"	Karol G with Judeline and Rusowsky	

== Hot Latin Songs weeks at number one ==
=== Songs ===
Number of weeks	Song	Artist(s)
31	"DTMF"	Bad Bunny
13	"Bby Wow"	Karol G with Judeline and Rusowsky
2	"Baile Inolvidable"	Bad Bunny
1	"Ahí"	Karol G and Drake

=== Artists ===
Number of weeks	Artist	Number of songs
33	Bad Bunny	2
14	Karol G	2
13	Judeline	1
13	Rusowsky	1
1	Drake	1

== See also ==
- 2026 in Latin music
- List of artists who reached number one on the U.S. Latin Songs chart
- List of number-one Billboard Latin Albums from the 2020s
