= List of Billboard number-one Latin rhythm songs of 2026 =

Hot Latin Rhythm Songs and Latin Rhythm Airplay are charts that rank the top-performing Latin rhythm songs in the United States, published by Billboard magazine.

== Chart history ==
Chart history
Issue date	Hot Latin Rhythm Songs			Latin Rhythm Airplay		
Issue date	Title	Artist	Ref.	Title	Artist(s)	Ref.
January 3	"DTMF"	Bad Bunny		"Perfumito Nuevo"	Bad Bunny	
January 10	"DTMF"	Bad Bunny		"Dem Bow"	Natti Natasha and Nando Boom	
January 17	"DTMF"	Bad Bunny		"Bzrp Music Sessions, Vol. 0/66"	Bizarrap and Daddy Yankee	
January 24	"DTMF"	Bad Bunny		"Bzrp Music Sessions, Vol. 0/66"	Bizarrap and Daddy Yankee	
January 31	"DTMF"	Bad Bunny		"Bzrp Music Sessions, Vol. 0/66"	Bizarrap and Daddy Yankee	
February 7	"DTMF"	Bad Bunny		"Bzrp Music Sessions, Vol. 0/66"	Bizarrap and Daddy Yankee	
February 14	"DTMF"	Bad Bunny		"Canción Para Regresar"	Sebastián Yatra, Lucho RK, Belinda and Gente de Zona	
February 21	"DTMF"	Bad Bunny		"Bzrp Music Sessions, Vol. 0/66"	Bizarrap and Daddy Yankee	
February 28	"DTMF"	Bad Bunny		"Bzrp Music Sessions, Vol. 0/66"	Bizarrap and Daddy Yankee	
March 7	"DTMF"	Bad Bunny		"Bzrp Music Sessions, Vol. 0/66"	Bizarrap and Daddy Yankee	
March 14	"DTMF"	Bad Bunny		"Si Te Vas"	J Balvin and Jay Wheeler	
March 21	"DTMF"	Bad Bunny		"Si Te Vas"	J Balvin and Jay Wheeler	
March 28	"DTMF"	Bad Bunny		"Enemigos"	Ozuna, Beéle and Ovy on the Drums	
April 4	"DTMF"	Bad Bunny		"Enemigos"	Ozuna, Beéle and Ovy on the Drums	
April 11	"DTMF"	Bad Bunny		"La Villa"	Ryan Castro, Kapo and Gangsta	
April 18	"DTMF"	Bad Bunny		"La Villa"	Ryan Castro, Kapo and Gangsta	
April 25	"DTMF"	Bad Bunny		"La Villa"	Ryan Castro, Kapo and Gangsta	
May 2	"DTMF"	Bad Bunny		"La Villa"	Ryan Castro, Kapo and Gangsta	
May 9	"DTMF"	Bad Bunny		"La Villa"	Ryan Castro, Kapo and Gangsta	
May 16	"DTMF"	Bad Bunny		"Inglés En Miami"	Rawayana and Manuel Turizo	
May 23	"DTMF"	Bad Bunny		"Inglés En Miami"	Rawayana and Manuel Turizo	
May 30	"DTMF"	Bad Bunny		"Me Voy a la Chingada"	Yandel and Xavi	
June 6	"DTMF"	Bad Bunny		"Me Voy a la Chingada"	Yandel and Xavi	
June 13	"DTMF"	Bad Bunny		"Me Voy a la Chingada"	Yandel and Xavi	
June 20	"DTMF"	Bad Bunny		"Una Aventura"	Ozuna	
June 27	"DTMF"	Bad Bunny		"Una Aventura"	Ozuna	
July 4	"DTMF"	Bad Bunny		"Una Aventura"	Ozuna	
July 11	"DTMF"	Bad Bunny		"5 Estrellas (W Sound 23)"	W Sound, Myke Towers and Ovy on the Drums	
July 18	"DTMF"	Bad Bunny		"5 Estrellas (W Sound 23)"	W Sound, Myke Towers and Ovy on the Drums	
July 25	"DTMF"	Bad Bunny		"Una Aventura"	Ozuna	
August 1	"DTMF"	Bad Bunny		"Yapaqué"	Farruko, Greeicy and Steve Aoki	
August 8	"DTMF"	Bad Bunny		"Yapaqué"	Farruko, Greeicy and Steve Aoki	
August 15	"DTMF"	Bad Bunny		Zion and Chencho Corleone	"Caducaste"	
August 22	"Bby Wow"	Karol G, Judeline and Rusowsky		"De Lejitos"	Jay Wheeler	
August 29	"Bby Wow"	Karol G, Judeline and Rusowsky		"De Lejitos"	Jay Wheeler	
September 5	"Bby Wow"	Karol G, Judeline and Rusowsky		"Polaroid"	Eladio Carrión	
September 12	"Bby Wow"	Karol G, Judeline and Rusowsky		"De Lejitos"	Jay Wheeler	
September 19	"Bby Wow"	Karol G, Judeline and Rusowsky		"Chévere"	Aria Vega and Ryan Castro	
September 26	"Bby Wow"	Karol G, Judeline and Rusowsky		"De Lejitos"	Jay Wheeler	
October 3	"Bby Wow"	Karol G, Judeline and Rusowsky		"Koko"	Omar Courtz	
October 10	"Bby Wow"	Karol G, Judeline and Rusowsky		"Koko"	Omar Courtz	
October 17	"Bby Wow"	Karol G, Judeline and Rusowsky		"Bby Wow"	Karol G, Judeline and Rusowsky	
October 24	"Bby Wow"	Karol G, Judeline and Rusowsky		"Bby Wow"	Karol G, Judeline and Rusowsky	
October 31	"Bby Wow"	Karol G, Judeline and Rusowsky		"Ahi"	Karol G and Drake	
November 7	"Bby Wow"	Karol G, Judeline and Rusowsky		"Bby Wow"	Karol G, Judeline and Rusowsky	
November 14	"Bby Wow"	Karol G, Judeline and Rusowsky		"Bby Wow"	Karol G, Judeline and Rusowsky	
November 21	"Bby Wow"	Karol G, Judeline and Rusowsky		"Bby Wow"	Karol G, Judeline and Rusowsky	
