= 2026 in Latin music =

The following is a list of events and new Spanish- and Portuguese-language music that happened or are expected to happen in 2026 in Ibero-America. Ibero-America encompasses Latin America, Spain, Portugal, and the Latin population in Canada and the United States.

== Events ==
=== January–March ===
- January 29 — The Las Mujeres Ya No Lloran World Tour by Shakira breaks the Guinness World Record for the highest-grossing tour by a Latin artist.
- February 1 — The 68th Annual Grammy Awards are held at the Crypto.com Arena in Los Angeles, California:
  - Debí Tirar Más Fotos by Bad Bunny becomes the first Spanish-language album to win the Grammy Award for Album of the Year. Bad Bunny also wins the Grammy Award for Best Música Urbana Album for Debí Tirar Más Fotos and Best Global Music Performance for "Eoo".
  - Cancionera by Natalia Lafourcade wins Best Latin Pop Album.
  - Papota by Ca7riel & Paco Amoroso wins Best Latin Rock or Alternative Album.
  - Palabra de To's (Seca) by Carín León wins Best Música Mexicana Album (including Tejano).
  - Raíces by Gloria Estefan wins Best Tropical Latin Album.
  - A Tribute to Benny Moré and Nat King Cole by Gonzalo Rubalcaba, Yainer Horta & Joey Calveiro wins Best Latin Jazz Album.
  - Caetano e Bethânia Ao Vivo by Caetano Veloso and Maria Bethânia wins Best Global Music Album.
- February 8 — The Super Bowl LX halftime show is held in San Francisco, California. Bad Bunny became the first solo Latino act and to mainly perform in Spanish.

=== April–June ===
- April 12 — Karol G headlines Coachella 2026, becoming the first female Latin artist to do so. Special guests on the first weekend included Wisin, Becky G, Mariah Angeliq and Greg Gonzalez of Cigarettes After Sex.
- April 28 — "DTMF by Bad Bunny breaks the record for the most weeks at number one on the Billboard Hot Latin Songs chart with 57 weeks. The record was previously held by "Despacito" by Luis Fonsi and Daddy Yankee featuring Justin Bieber.

== Spanish- and Portuguese-language songs on the Billboard Global 200 ==
The Billboard Global 200 is a weekly record chart published by Billboard magazine that ranks the top songs globally based on digital sales and online streaming from over 200 territories worldwide.

An asterisk (*) represents that a single is charting for the current week.

| Song | Performer(s) | Entry | Peak | Weeks | Ref. |
2020 entries
| "Yo Perreo Sola" | Bad Bunny | September 19, 2020 | 74 | 13 | |
| "Safaera" | Bad Bunny, Jowell & Randy & Ñengo Flow | October 3, 2020 | 80 | 4 | |
| "Dákiti" | Bad Bunny & Jhay Cortez | November 14, 2020 | 1 | 111 | |
| "Feliz Navidad" | José Feliciano | November 28, 2020 | 5 | 38 | |
2022 entries
| "La Canción" | J Balvin & Bad Bunny | February 12, 2022 | 15 | 49 | |
| "Tití Me Preguntó" | Bad Bunny | May 21, 2022 | 4 | 98 | |
| "Moscow Mule" | Bad Bunny | May 21, 2022 | 2 | 52 | |
| "Ojitos Lindos" | Bad Bunny & Bomba Estéreo | May 21, 2022 | 4 | 72 | |
| "Me Porto Bonito" | Bad Bunny & Chencho Corleone | May 21, 2022 | 2 | 79 | |
| "Callaíta" | Bad Bunny & Tainy | May 21, 2022 | 41 | 19 | |
2023 entries
| "Danza Kuduro" | Don Omar & Lucenzo | June 3, 2023 | 75 | 74* | |
| "Monaco" | Bad Bunny | October 28, 2023 | 1 | 27 | |
2024 entries
| "Gata Only" | FloyyMenor X Cris Mj | February 24, 2024 | 4 | 110 | |
| "Si Antes Te Hubiera Conocido" | Karol G | July 6, 2024 | 5 | 123* | |
| "Qué Pasaría..." | Rauw Alejandro & Bad Bunny | November 30, 2024 | 20 | 59 | |
| "El Clúb" | Bad Bunny | December 21, 2024 | 15 | 12 | |
2025 entries
| "Nuevayol" | Bad Bunny | January 18, 2025 | 3 | 92 | |
| "Baile Inolvidable" | Bad Bunny | January 18, 2025 | 2 | 97* | |
| "DTMF" | Bad Bunny | January 18, 2025 | 1 | 97* | |
| "Voy a Llevarte Pa' PR" | Bad Bunny | January 18, 2025 | 8 | 55 | |
| "Eoo" | Bad Bunny | January 18, 2025 | 4 | 96* | |
| "Kloufrens" | Bad Bunny | January 18, 2025 | 18 | 23 | |
| "La Mudanza" | Bad Bunny | January 18, 2025 | 34 | 7 | |
| "Lo Que Le Pasó a Hawaii" | Bad Bunny | January 18, 2025 | 43 | 6 | |
| "Turista" | Bad Bunny | January 18, 2025 | 24 | 6 | |
| "Ketu Tecré" | Bad Bunny | January 18, 2025 | 20 | 7 | |
| "Bokete" | Bad Bunny | January 18, 2025 | 28 | 6 | |
| "Veldá" | Bad Bunny, Omar Courtz & Dei V | January 18, 2025 | 9 | 47 | |
| "Weltita" | Bad Bunny & Chuwi | January 18, 2025 | 12 | 14 | |
| "Café con Ron" | Bad Bunny & Los Pleneros de la Cresta | January 18, 2025 | 31 | 9 | |
| "Perfumito Nuevo" | Bad Bunny & RaiNao | January 18, 2025 | 14 | 8 | |
| "La Plena (W Sound 05)" | W Sound, Beéle & Ovy on the Drums | March 15, 2025 | 11 | 57 | |
| "Coqueta" | Fuerza Regida & Grupo Frontera | May 10, 2025 | 115 | 33 | |
| "Marlboro Rojo" | Fuerza Regida | May 24, 2025 | 33 | 58 | |
| "Tu Sancho" | Fuerza Regida | May 31, 2025 | 19 | 48 | |
| "No Tiene Sentido" | Beéle | June 7, 2025 | 27 | 36 | |
| "P do Pecado (Puro Suco do Brasil)" | Menos É Mais & Simone Mendes | August 9, 2025 | 57 | 22 | |
| "Tú Vas Sin (Fav)" | Rels B | August 9, 2025 | 58 | 22 | |
| "Yogurcito" | Blessd | September 13, 2025 | 92 | 19 | |
| "Posso Até Não Te Dar Flores" | DJ Japa NK, MC Jacaré, MC Meno K, MC Ryan SP & DJ Davi DogDog | November 1, 2025 | 36 | 17 | |
| "Cuando No Era Cantante" | El Bogueto x Yung Beef | November 8, 2025 | 5 | 22 | |
| "La Perla" | Rosalía & Yahritza y su Esencia | November 22, 2025 | 12 | 15 | |
| "No Batidão" | ZXKAI & sluxghter | November 22, 2025 | 28 | 30 | |
| "Intro" | Peso Pluma & Tito Double P | December 6, 2025 | 125 | 2 | |
| "Ya Borracho" | Herencia de Grandes | December 6, 2025 | 75 | 17 | |
2026 entries
| "Dopamina" | Peso Pluma & Tito Double P | January 10, 2026 | 20 | 17 | |
| "Bckpckbyz" | Peso Pluma & Tito Double P | January 10, 2026 | 58 | 2 | |
| "Daño" | Peso Pluma & Tito Double P | January 10, 2026 | 47 | 23 | |
| "Ni Pedo" | Peso Pluma & Tito Double P | January 10, 2026 | 74 | 3 | |
| "7-3" | Peso Pluma & Tito Double P | January 10, 2026 | 53 | 14 | |
| "Eu Me Apaixonei" | Vitinho Imperador | January 10, 2026 | 128 | 1 | |
| "Putielegante" | Peso Pluma & Tito Double P | January 10, 2026 | 146 | 1 | |
| "Pvta Luna" | Netón Vega | January 10, 2026 | 105 | 12 | |
| "Jetski" | Pedro Sampaio, MC Meno K & Melody | January 10, 2026 | 97 | 7 | |
| "Pela Última Vez (O Puro Suco do Brasil)" | Grupo Menos É Mais & Nattan | January 10, 2026 | 192 | 1 | |
| "Cuando No Era Cantante (Remix)" | El Bogueto, Fuerza Regida, Anuel AA & Yung Beef | January 17, 2026 | 25 | 35* | |
| "La Villa" | Ryan Castro, Kapo & Gangsta | January 17, 2026 | 64 | 12 | |
| "IIII x IIII" | Omar Camacho x Víctor Mendivil x Ángel Almaguer x $HUPE | January 31, 2026 | 193 | 2 | |
| "Todo lo Fue" | Lenin Ramírez | February 7, 2026 | 142 | 13 | |
| "Canasteo" | Regulo Molina X Óscar Maydon X Netón Vega | February 7, 2026 | 172 | 1 | |
| "Diles" | DJ Luian & Mambo Kingz Presents Bad Bunny X Ñengo Flow X Ozuna X Arcángel X Farruko | February 21, 2026 | 105 | 1 | |
| "Mía" | Bad Bunny Featuring Drake | February 21, 2026 | 144 | 1 | |
| "Droga Letal" | Junior H, Gael Valenzuela & Peso Pluma | February 28, 2026 | 96 | 1 | |
| "Forever Tu Gantel" | Omar Courtz & Ñengo Flow | March 7, 2026 | 173 | 2 | |
| "Rosita" | Tainy, Rauw Alejandro, Jhayco | March 7, 2026 | 192 | 1 | |
| "Chiclona" | Peso Pluma, Tito Double P & Lencho | March 14, 2026 | 120 | 5 | |
| "Koko" | Omar Courtz | April 11, 2026 | 75 | 13 | |
| "Last Breath" | Kanye West & Peso Pluma | April 11, 2026 | 155 | 1 | |
| "De Lejitos" | Jay Wheeler | April 25, 2026 | 77 | 23* | |
| "Nalguita & Teta" | Netón Vega | May 16, 2026 | 127 | 8 | |
| "Superestrella" | Aitana | August 1, 2026 | 53 | 15 | |
| "¿Y Qué Fue?" | Don Miguelo | August 1, 2026 | 95 | 3 | |
| "Dichavate" | Ya Ice Dilan X Rey Tony X Helabusador | August 8, 2026 | 161 | 4 | |
| "Matadora" | Karol G | August 15, 2026 | 84 | 3 | |
| "Ahí" | Karol G & Drake | August 22, 2026 | 103 | 1 | |
| "Bby Wow" | Karol G, Judeline & Rusowsky | August 22, 2026 | 1 | 14* | |
| "Te Estoy Correteando" | Latin Mafia & Fred Again | August 22, 2026 | 83 | 10 | |
| "Riki" | Netón Vega | August 29, 2026 | 71 | 4 | |
| "Ayúdame" | Los Dos de Tamaulipas | August 29, 2026 | 174 | 2 | |
| "Zizi" | Ozuna & Omar Courtz | August 29, 2026 | 188 | 1 | |
| "Olivia La Flaka" | Natanael Cano, Tito Double P, Víctor Mendivil & Ovi | October 10, 2026 | 46 | 4 | |
| "Postinho de Gasolina" | João Gustavo & Murilo & Grelo | October 17, 2026 | 91 | 6* | |
| "Pos (Em Brasília)" | Felipe & Rodrigo | October 24, 2026 | 38 | 5* | |
| "Suzuki" | Fuerza Regida | October 31, 2026 | 46 | 4* | |
| "Flash" | Hugo & Guilherme | November 7, 2026 | 62 | 3* | |
| "Paradixe" | Feid, El Americano 4KT & Pirlo | November 21, 2026 | 110 | 1* | |
| "Olimpo" | Netón Vega & Fuerza Regida | November 21, 2026 | 143 | 1* | |

== Spanish-language songs on the Billboard Hot 100 ==
The Billboard Hot 100 ranks the most-played songs in the United States based on sales (physical and digital), radio play, and online streaming. Also included are certifications awarded by the Recording Industry Association of America (RIAA) based on digital downloads and on-demand audio and/or video song streams: gold certification is awarded for sales of 500,000 copies, platinum for one million units, and multi-platinum for two million units, and following in increments of one million thereafter. The RIAA also awards Spanish-language songs under the Latin certification: Disco de Oro (Gold) is awarded for sales 30,000 certification copies, Disco de Platino (Platinum) for 60,000 units, and Disco de Multi-Platino (Multi-Platinum) for 120,000 units, and following in increments of 60,000 thereafter.

| Song | Performer(s) | Entry | Peak | Weeks | RIAA certification | Ref. |
2017 entries
| "Feliz Navidad" | José Feliciano | January 7, 2017 | 6 | 43 | | |
2019 entries
| "La Canción" | J Balvin & Bad Bunny | September 14, 2019 | 27 | 12 | | |
2020 entries
| "Dákiti" | Bad Bunny & Jhay Cortez | November 14, 2020 | 5 | 29 | 24× Platinum (Latin) | |
2022 entries
| "Tití Me Preguntó" | Bad Bunny | May 21, 2022 | 5 | 33 | | |
2023 entries
| "Monaco" | Bad Bunny | October 28, 2023 | 5 | 21 | | |
2024 entries
| "Qué Pasaría..." | Rauw Alejandro & Bad Bunny | November 30, 2024 | 34 | 21 | Gold (Latin) | |
| "El Clúb" | Bad Bunny | December 21, 2024 | 27 | 9 | | |
2025 entries
| "DTMF" | Bad Bunny | January 18, 2025 | 1 | 30 | | |
| "Baile Inolvidable" | Bad Bunny | January 18, 2025 | 2 | 26 | | |
| "Nuevayol" | Bad Bunny | January 18, 2025 | 5 | 26 | | |
| "Voy a Llevarte Pa' PR" | Bad Bunny | January 18, 2025 | 14 | 20 | | |
| "Eoo" | Bad Bunny | January 18, 2025 | 11 | 33 | | |
| "La Mudanza" | Bad Bunny | January 18, 2025 | 51 | 5 | | |
| "Kloufrens" | Bad Bunny | January 18, 2025 | 40 | 6 | | |
| "Lo Que le Pasó a Hawaii" | Bad Bunny | January 18, 2025 | 62 | 4 | | |
| "Veldá" | Bad Bunny, Omar Courtz & Dei V | January 18, 2025 | 23 | 9 | | |
| "Café con Ron" | Bad Bunny & Los Pleneros de la Cresta | January 18, 2025 | 48 | 6 | | |
| "Weltita" | Bad Bunny & Chuwi | January 18, 2025 | 32 | 7 | | |
| "Perfumito Nuevo" | Bad Bunny & RaiNao | January 18, 2025 | 31 | 6 | | |
| "Amor" | Emmanuell Cortés | November 8, 2025 | 88 | 7 | 19× Platinum (Latin) | |
2026 entries
| "Dopamina" | Peso Pluma & Tito Double P | January 10, 2026 | 52 | 3 | 12× Platinum (Latin) | |
| "Daño" | Peso Pluma & Tito Double P | January 10, 2026 | 75 | 9 | 13× Platinum (Latin) | |
| "Ni Pedo" | Peso Pluma & Tito Double P | January 10, 2026 | 76 | 1 | | |
| "Bckpckbyz" | Peso Pluma & Tito Double P | January 10, 2026 | 79 | 1 | | |
| "Droga Letal" | Junior H, Gael Valenzuela & Peso Pluma | February 28, 2026 | 100 | 1 | | |
| "Last Breath" | Ye & Peso Pluma | April 11, 2026 | 81 | 1 | | |
| "Ferrari" | Clave Especial, Fuerza Regida & Los Gemelos de Sinaloa | May 2, 2026 | 83 | 1 | | |
| "Después de Ti" | Karol G & Greg González | May 9, 2026 | 96 | 1 | | |
| "Matadora" | Karol G | August 8, 2026 | 58 | 6 | | |
| "Ahí" | Karol G & Drake | August 22, 2026 | 44 | 12 | | |
| "Bby Wow" | Karol G, Judeline & Rusowsky | August 22, 2026 | 6 | 14* | | |
| "Ayúdame" | Los Dos de Tamaulipas | August 29, 2026 | 99 | 2 | | |

== Albums released ==
The following is a list of notable Latin albums (music performed in Spanish or Portuguese) (Note: In the United States, Billboard and the RIAA recognizes an album as "Latin" if 51% or more of its content is sung in the Spanish language. The Latin Recording Academy extends this definition of "Latin music" to include Portuguese-language records as well as other languages and dialects of Ibero-America such as Catalan, Nahuatl, Quechua, Galician, Valencia, and Mayan. The Latin Recording Academy also includes Latin instrumental recordings performed by Ibero-American musicians. Note that Spain and Portugal are included under this definition of Ibero-America.) that have been released in Latin America, Spain, Portugal, or the United States in 2026.

=== First-quarter ===
==== January ====
| Day | Title | Artist(s) | Genre(s) | Singles | Label |
|---|---|---|---|---|---|
| 2 | La Bruja, La Niña y El Dragón | Lola Índigo | | | Universal Music Spain |
| 2 | ¿Dónde Es El After? | Rawayana | | | Brocoli Records, Rimas Entertainment |
| 6 | El Bárbardo del Reparto | Wow Popy | | | Plus Media |
| 8 | No vuelve a suceder (calentamiento pre álbum) | Clarent | | | Warner Latina |
| 16 | La 8va Maravilla | Arcángel | | | Rimas Entertainment |
| 16 | Ghetto Vato 2: Siempre Ghetto | Baby Gas | | | Empire |
| 16 | Para Caídas | Carlos Neda | | | |
| 16 | 30 Años | Dani Flow | | | Virgin Music México |
| 16 | Eterno | Juan Gabriel | | | Virgin Music |
| 16 | Bandoleros | Mariachi El Bronx | | | ATO |
| 23 | El Plugg 3 Ova 2 | Yung Beef | | | Empire |
| 23 | Natural al Natural | Paulina Goto | | | Empire |
| 23 | Infinito | Yandel | Reggaeton | | Rimas Entertainment |
| 30 | Bohemio | Nicky Jam | | | Virgin Music |
| 30 | Al Romper La Burbuja 2 | Joaquina | | | UMG |

==== June ====
| Day | Title | Artist(s) | Genre(s) | Singles | Label |
|---|---|---|---|---|---|
| 5 | TIEMPO | Anna Lola | Jazz, Latin Music | Rumba Random, Tiempo, Nosotros, Pan Comido, Bolero Azul, Cantar, Bailar, Imagina | |

=== September ===
| Day | Title | Artist(s) | Genre(s) | Singles | Label |
|---|---|---|---|---|---|
| 25 | Toc-Toc | Ed Motta | Jazz, Pop music, Soft rock | | Dwitza, MPS Records |

== Deaths ==
- 10 January – Yeison Jiménez, 34, Colombian singer
- 14 January – Quemil Yambay, 87, Paraguayan musician and composer
- 28 January – Nilton César, 86, Brazilian singer
