= List of number-one singles of 2026 (Spain) =

This lists the singles that reached number one on the Spanish PROMUSICAE sales and airplay charts in 2026. Total sales correspond to the data sent by regular contributors to sales volumes and by digital distributors.

== Chart history ==
Week	Issue date	Top Streaming, Downloads & Physical Sales			Most Airplay		
Week	Issue date	Artist(s)	Song	Ref.	Artist(s)	Song	Ref.
1	December 26	Romeo Santos and Prince Royce	"Dardos"		Huntrix	"Golden"	
2	January 2	Romeo Santos and Prince Royce	"Dardos"		Huntrix	"Golden"	
3	January 9	Romeo Santos and Prince Royce	"Dardos"		Huntrix	"Golden"	
4	January 16	Romeo Santos and Prince Royce	"Dardos"		Huntrix	"Golden"	
5	January 23	Romeo Santos and Prince Royce	"Dardos"		Huntrix	"Golden"	
6	January 30	Rosalía and Yahritza y su Esencia	"La Perla"		Huntrix	"Golden"	
7	February 6	Bad Bunny	"Baile Inolvidable"		Huntrix	"Golden"	
8	February 13	Quevedo	"Ni Borracho"		Huntrix	"Golden"	
9	February 20	Quevedo	"Ni Borracho"		Nil Moliner	"Nexo 04:Tu Cuerpo en Braille"	
10	February 27	Quevedo	"Ni Borracho"		Rosalía and Yahritza y su Esencia	"La Perla"	
11	March 6	Quevedo	"Ni Borracho"		Aitana	"Superestrella"	
12	March 13	Quevedo	"Ni Borracho"		Romeo Santos and Prince Royce	"Dardos"	
13	March 20	Quevedo	"Scandic"		Aitana	"Superestrella"	
14	March 27	Quevedo	"Scandic"		Taylor Swift	"Opalite"	
15	April 4	Omar Courtz	"Koko"		Romeo Santos and Prince Royce	"Dardos"	
16	April 11	Jay Wheeler	"De Lejitos"		Romeo Santos and Prince Royce	"Dardos"	
17	April 18	Jay Wheeler	"De Lejitos"		Taylor Swift	"The Fate of Ophelia"	
18	April 25	Quevedo and Elvis Crespo	"La Graciosa"		Taylor Swift	"The Fate of Ophelia"	
19	May 1	Quevedo and Nueva Linea	"Al Golpito"		Djo	"End of Beginning"	
20	May 8	Quevedo and Nueva Linea	"Al Golpito"		Aitana	"Superestrella"	
21	May 15	Quevedo and Nueva Linea	"Al Golpito"		Taylor Swift	"Opalite"	
22	May 22	Quevedo and Elvis Crespo	"La Graciosa"		Taylor Swift	"The Fate of Ophelia"	
23	May 29	Quevedo and Elvis Crespo	"La Graciosa"		Aitana	"Superestrella"	
24	June 5	Quevedo and Elvis Crespo	"La Graciosa"		Aitana	"Superestrella"	
25	June 12	Quevedo and Elvis Crespo	"La Graciosa"		Aitana	"Superestrella"	
26	June 19	Quevedo and Elvis Crespo	"La Graciosa"		Quevedo and Elvis Crespo	"La Graciosa"	
27	June 26	Quevedo and Elvis Crespo	"La Graciosa"		Aitana	"Superestrella"	
28	July 3	Quevedo and Elvis Crespo	"La Graciosa"		Shakira and Burna Boy	"Dai Dai"	
29	July 10	Quevedo and Elvis Crespo	"La Graciosa"		Shakira and Burna Boy	"Dai Dai"	
30	July 17	Quevedo and Elvis Crespo	"La Graciosa"		Shakira and Burna Boy	"Dai Dai"	
31	July 24	Quevedo and Elvis Crespo	"La Graciosa"		Shakira and Burna Boy	"Dai Dai"	
32	July 31	Quevedo and Elvis Crespo	"La Graciosa"		Quevedo and Elvis Crespo	"La Graciosa"	
33	August 7	Quevedo and Elvis Crespo	"La Graciosa"		Shakira and Burna Boy	"Dai Dai"	
34	August 14	Quevedo and Elvis Crespo	"La Graciosa"		Shakira and Burna Boy	"Dai Dai"	
35	August 21	Quevedo and Elvis Crespo	"La Graciosa"		Shakira and Burna Boy	"Dai Dai"	
36	August 28	Karol G, Judeline and Rusowsky	"Bby Wow"		Shakira and Burna Boy	"Dai Dai"	
37	September 4	Karol G, Judeline and Rusowsky	"Bby Wow"		Ana Mena and Lola Índigo	"Pa Ti Toa"	
38	September 11	Karol G, Judeline and Rusowsky	"Bby Wow"		Ana Mena and Lola Índigo	"Pa Ti Toa"	
39	September 18	Karol G, Judeline and Rusowsky	"Bby Wow"		Ana Mena and Lola Índigo	"Pa Ti Toa"	
40	September 25	Karol G, Judeline and Rusowsky	"Bby Wow"		Ana Mena and Lola Índigo	"Pa Ti Toa"	
41	October 2	Clarent and Quevedo	"Jukiar"		Ana Mena and Lola Índigo	"Pa Ti Toa"	
42	October 9	Karol G, Judeline and Rusowsky	"Bby Wow"		Ana Mena and Lola Índigo	"Pa Ti Toa"	
43	October 16	Karol G, Judeline and Rusowsky	"Bby Wow"		Ana Mena and Lola Índigo	"Pa Ti Toa"	
44	October 23	La Pantera and Quevedo	"Doggy"		Ana Mena and Lola Índigo	"Pa Ti Toa"	
45	October 30	Lucho RK	"Retrica"		Ana Mena and Lola Índigo	"Pa Ti Toa"	
46	November 6	Lucho RK	"Retrica"		Karol G, Judeline and Rusowsky	"Bby Wow"	

== See also ==
- List of number-one albums of 2026 (Spain)
