= Bby Wow =

Single by Karol G, Judeline and Rusowsky

from the album No Me Arrepiento de Sentir Tanto
- Language: Spanish
- Released: September 25, 2026
- Recorded: c. August 2026
- Genre: Dancehall; Latin pop
- Length: 3:45
- Label: Bichota; Interscope
- Songwriters: Carolina Giraldo; Lara Fernández; Ruslán Mediavilla; Marco Masís; Omer Fedi; Andrés Correa
- Producers: Karol G; Judeline; Rusowsky; Tainy; Fedi

Karol G singles chronology
"Still" (2026)	"Bby Wow" (2026)

Judeline singles chronology
"Besito" (2026)	"Bby Wow" (2026)	"La Falda" (2026)

Rusowsky singles chronology
"Malibu" (2025)	"Bby Wow" (2026)

Music video
- "Bby Wow" on YouTube

"Bby Wow" (stylized as "BbY WOW") is a song by Colombian singer-songwriter Karol G and Spanish singer-songwriters Judeline and Rusowsky, from the former's sixth studio album No Me Arrepiento de Sentir Tanto (2026). It was released as the album's fourth single on September 5, 2026. Alongside the performers, the song was co-produced Tainy and Omer Fedi. They all additionally co-wrote the track, alongside Andrés Jael Correa Ríos. "Bby Wow" is a dancehall and Latin pop track that samples the "Coolie Dance" riddim, thematically revolving around a lost relationship and Giraldo remembering someone she is unable to forget.

"Bby Wow" was written in January 2026, during a writing session with Judeline, where they additionally wrote three more songs for its parent album. It was originally intended to be excluded from the album after Giraldo deemed it unfinished, but reconsidered as she felt that the song needed performances from Judeline and Rusowsky, the latter whose music influenced Giraldo. Giraldo described the track as an emotional song that people can also find themselves dancing to. The song received positive feedback from music critics, who complimented its production, sample usage and catchiness, with some reviewers additionally calling it an album highlight.

"Bby Wow" was met with a widespread commercial success, peaking at number six on the US Billboard Hot 100 and at number one on the US Hot Latin Songs chart, being Judeline and Rusowsky's first top-10 song on the former and their first number-one song on the latter. It also reached number one on the Billboard Global 200, and additionally topped the national charts in 15 countries, including Argentina, Bolivia, Colombia, Costa Rica, Ecuador, Mexico, Panama, Paraguay, Peru, Spain, Switzerland, Uruguay and Venezuela. Its music video, which is labeled "Live from New York", was released on October 15, 2026, and is a montage of clips, including Giraldo's concert at MetLife Stadium, where all three artists performed "Bby Wow" together; the performance was deemed as one of the concert's best moments.

== Background and release ==
On July 29, 2026, Karol G announced her sixth studio album No Me Arrepiento de Sentir Tanto (2026), during a concert at Rogers Stadium in Toronto, revealing its cover art and confirming its release for August 7 of the same year. During the concert, she revealed that she had spent the "past couple of months" recording the album. Sometime before its release, Giraldo told her team about it and were worried that releasing it without any marketing strategy would interfere with her ongoing Viajando Por el Mundo Tropitour. She explained that she wanted to release it because she could not wait to perform its tracks for her fans. The album's tracklist was revealed on August 5, in which "Bby Wow" was listed as its 11th track; Spanish singer-songwriters Judeline and Rusowsky were additionally announced as the song's additional performers.

Soon after its official release on August 7 through Bichota and Interscope Records, "Bby Wow" had already become a fan favorite track. Despite not initially being released as one of the album's main singles nor supported with a music video at the time, it went viral on social media and was met with commercial success in the coming weeks; this virality can be attributed to Venezuelan group Los Menor3s and their dance to the song. Giraldo stated that the song's growing popularity was a surprise to her, as she was not expecting any commercial success from any of the tracks from her album. The song was additionally released as a standalone single on digital platforms on September 25, with a specific single cover. Universal Music released the song to Italian radio stations on October 16.

== Writing and recording ==
During the album's creative process, Giraldo had been influenced by other music genres, including ambient, indie and pop rock, putting her interest in reggaeton aside for a while. She also contacted Judeline to write a few songs for the album. Before this, Judeline had taken a break from writing songs for other artists, but reconsidered as she "felt that it could be a good thing" with Giraldo. After spending three to four days in the studio, Judeline had co-written four songs for the album, including "Bby Wow", which was written in January 2026. It was originally supposed to have Giraldo as its sole performer, but she felt that the song was in an unfinished state and decided not to include it in the album.

Giraldo had been listening to Rusowsky's music over the summer that year, and later found interest in working on "Bby Wow" again, realizing that the song needed performances from him and Judeline. This decision was made during the same week that she was about to announce the album's tracklist. To accomplish this, she spoke with her manager two days before this and requested that both artists record their verses for the song before the next day. Judeline was in her hometown when she was notified and hurried to the nearest recording studio, which resembled a fried fish restaurant from its exterior. After finally receiving the verses, which were recorded remotely in different parts of Spain, she immediately revealed the album's tracklist on August 5.

== Music and lyrics ==
"Bby Wow"
A 22-second sample of the main chorus in "Bby Wow", demonstrating its dancehall production and sample usage

Giraldo wrote "Bby Wow", along with Judeline, Rusowsky, Tainy, Omer Fedi and Andrés Correa, with all but the latter additionally producing it. With a duration of 3 minutes and 45 seconds, "Bby Wow" is an upbeat dancehall and Latin pop track, (Note: Critics from Billboard, Complex, and Pitchfork have referred "Bby Wow" as a dancehall track, while authors from El País and Radiónica referred to it as a Latin pop track.) with elements of alternative pop, reggaeton, R&B, and urbano music, as well as electronic textures. It samples the "Coolie Dance" riddim, which is heard throughout the entire song. Because of the use of this sample, critics compared the track to Nina Sky's "Move Ya Body" and Kat DeLuna's "Whine Up".

"Bby Wow" is a melancholic song in lyrical context, revolving around a lost relationship. The song begins with Rusowsky's lo-fi, avant-pop-like vocals. Then, Giraldo sings about the difficulty of forgetting about a person who still has a romantic interest in her, therefore igniting a possibility of getting back together as a second chance. Fans and various publications speculated that the track was about Giraldo's ex-partner, Colombian singer Feid; the "Wow" in the song's title was thought to reference Feid's ad lib that is heard in his music. Giraldo also felt that her album, No Me Arrepiento de Sentir Tanto, needed an emotional song that people could also find themselves dancing to, further explaining the concept of "Bby Wow",

"So, what happens when you're in the club and you're heartbroken? You just think about the other person, about the song you'd love to be dancing to with that person. [...] Live, I wanted to sing that song with more people on stage and for it to really become a bit more of a party."

== Critical reception ==
"Bby Wow" received positive reviews from critics. In a ranking of all 14 tracks from No Me Arrepiento de Sentir Tanto, Jessica Roiz from Billboard ranked "Bby Wow" at number four, additionally calling it "a bop" in a separate article. Pitchfork's Maria Nenet Barrios referred it as one of the album's best collaborations, stating that it "hits the mark" that Giraldo's other collaborations from the album, "Ahí" with Drake and "Still" with Bruno Mars in particular, were not able to reach. AllMusic's David Crone named "Bby Wow" as the album's main highlight, additionally stating that it "runs a similar path to success as" her 2023 song "Ojos Ferrari".

Complex's Dimas Sanfiorenzo and Antonio Johri agreed that the track is "one of the better uses of the ["Coolie Dance" riddim], as they flip the familiar rhythm into a melancholy pop banger". Jenesaispop's Gabriel Carey called it an "unexpected hit", calling it a catchy track that "gives off [a] fresh, summery energy". María Munsuri from Vogue Spain complimented the track, commenting that "the angelic voices of [Judeline and Rusowsky] intertwine with that of the Colombian to create a catchy hit from the first listen." Jamaican producer Cordel "Skatta" Burrell, the creator of the "Coolie Dance" riddim that is used on "Bby Wow", responded positively to the track, saying that Giraldo "did a great job" on the song and called it a "child of the 2000s."

== Commercial performance ==
=== Native continents ===
In Giraldo's native country Colombia, "Bby Wow" debuted at number 36 on the Colombia Hot 100 chart, later rising 32 positions to number four in its second week as the chart's Greatest Gainer, earning 933,492 streams in the country. It eventually peaked at number one on the chart, in its third week. Elsewhere in South America, "Bby Wow" reached the top position of national charts in Argentina, Bolivia, Chile, Ecuador (Streaming), Paraguay, Panama (International Chart), Peru, Uruguay and Venezuela (Airplay).

In Judeline and Rusowsky's native country Spain, the song rose from its debut position of number 30 to number 10 in its second week. In its third week, it rose to number three, just behind two songs by Spanish singer Quevedo. The song reached a new peak of number one on the chart in its fourth week, making it Judeline and Rusowsky's first number-one single on the chart and Giraldo's seventh. It also received a platinum certification in the country.

=== North America ===
On the issue dated August 22, 2026, "Bby Wow" also debuted at 73 on the Billboard Hot 100, earning 4.5 million streams within its first week of release in the United States. This was both Judeline and Rusowsky's first entries on a Billboard chart. On its fourth week, the song rose from number 29 to number 16 on the chart, making it Giraldo's third top 20 entry on the chart, after her respective collaborations with Shakira and Becky G, "TQG" and "Mamiii". On its fifth week, the song rose to the tenth position on the Hot 100, with 13.4 million streams and 3.8 million radio spins, making it Giraldo's second top-10 track on the chart, after "TQG", as well as Judeline and Rusowsky's first, becoming the first Spanish artists to reach the region since Enrique Iglesias in 2011, with Judeline being the first female Spanish artist to do so. It rose to number seven on its sixth week on the chart, and eventually reached a new peak of number six on its seventh week, making it all three artists' highest entry on the chart. After falling to number 11 following its peak on the chart, it returned to its top-10 region on the issue dated October 17.

"Bby Wow" debuted at number five on the US Hot Latin Songs chart, reaching the summit of that chart a week later, on the issue dated August 29, dethroning Giraldo's own track "Ahí" from the exact position. It has since spent eight weeks atop. It also peaked atop the Hot Latin Rhythm Songs and Latin Streaming Songs charts in its second week. On the issue dated October 17, "Bby Wow" rose to number one on both US Latin Airplay and Latin Rhythm Airplay charts, garnering 7.9 million radio impressions through a 13% increase, making it Giraldo's 22nd number-one song on the former chart, as well as Judeline and Rusowsky's first. In other North American countries, it peaked atop the single charts in Costa Rica (Streaming), El Salvador (Airplay), and Mexico (Streaming), as well as in Central America (Airplay). It also peaked within the top 10 in the Dominican Republic (Airplay) (5), Guatemala (Airplay) (9), Honduras (Airplay) (4), Nicaragua (Airplay) (5), and Puerto Rico (Airplay) (6).

=== Global ===
On August 12, 2026, "Bby Wow" debuted at the 189th position on the daily global Spotify chart. On August 28, it peaked atop the chart, making it Giraldo's second song to reach the summit of the chart, after "TQG" reached that position in 2023. Additionally, Judeline became the first female Spanish artist to have a song peak at number one on the chart. On September 1, it also reached the summit of the daily global Apple Music chart, making it all three artists' first number-one song on the chart. As of October 16, the song had spent 46 non-consecutive days atop the global Spotify chart, ranking among the 14 songs by female artists to spend the most days atop the chart.

"Bby Wow" rose from number 171 to a new peak of number 37 in its second week on the Billboard Global 200, earning 17.9 million streams worldwide. On its third week, it reached a new peak of number five on the same chart, earning 26 million streams worldwide from a 45% gain, as well as number 10 on the Billboard Global Excl. US chart in its second week. The song eventually reached its peak at the summit of both charts in its respective fourth and third week, garnering 42.3 million streams from a 62% increase, making it Giraldo's second song to reach the position, after "TQG", as well as Judeline and Rusowsky's first. It remained three additional weeks at number one on both charts, becoming Giraldo's first song to maintain its number-one position for more than one week on both charts. On the issue dated October 10, the song fell to the third and second positions of the Global 200 and Global Excl. US charts, respectively, before rising to number one again, maintaining that position for two additional weeks.

== Live performances ==
Giraldo initially did not perform "Bby Wow" at any of the first dates of her concert tour, Viajando Por el Mundo Tropitour. On August 21, 2026, she performed the song for the first time at Levi's Stadium in Santa Clara, California, as part of the tour. On September 12, Giraldo invited two members of Los Menor3s to perform the dance onstage during her concert at Gillette Stadium, in Foxborough, Massachusetts, as part of her tour.

On September 17, Giraldo invited Judeline, Rusowsky and Tainy to perform "Bby Wow" together for the first time during her concert at MetLife Stadium, in East Rutherford, New Jersey. As part of the concert's third act, the performance included fireworks shot into the sky, Tainy showcasing a new beat for the track and additionally displaying the flags of Colombia, Puerto Rico and Spain, and pink-and-blue light strobes. Billboard's Sigal Ratner-Arias and Consequence's Maria Villarroel called it one of the concert's best surprises. Stefanie Fernández of The Guardian stated that this performance of the song "picks [the pace of the concert's third act] back up".

== Music video ==
"Bby Wow" was initially supported with an audio visualizer that was released alongside its parent album, garnering more than 96 million views on YouTube as of October 2026. On October 15, 2026, an official video for the track was released on YouTube, subtitled "Live from New York". Garnering over a million views within one day of release, the video consists of a montage of clips, including the performance of the song at MetLife Stadium, where all three artists and Tainy performed it, as well as rehearsals and videos taken backstage during the concert. The video also includes clips from Giraldo's concert at Gillete Stadium, where she also performed the song's dance with Los Menor3s.

Critics saw the release of this video as a celebration for the song's commercial success and the conclusion of the North American leg of Giraldo's Viajando Por el Mundo Tropitour.

== Personnel ==
Credits are adapted from Apple Music and Tidal.

- Karol G – vocals
- Judeline – vocals
- Rusowsky – vocals
- Dave Kutch – mastering
- Rob Kinelski – mixing
- Eli Heisler – additional mixing
- Joey Mora – engineering

== Charts ==
=== Weekly charts ===
Weekly chart performance
Chart (2026)	Peak position
Argentina (CAPIF)	1
Argentina Hot 100 (Billboard)	1
Australia (ARIA)	88
Austria (Ö3 Austria Top 40)	26
Belgium (Ultratop 50 Wallonia)	21
Bolivia (IFPI Latin America)	1
Brazil Latino Airplay (Crowley)	7
Bulgaria Airplay (PROPHON)	4
Canada Hot 100 (Billboard)	33
Central America Airplay (Monitor Latino)	1
Central America + Caribbean Airplay (BMAT)	1
Chile (IFPI Latin America)	1
CIS Airplay (TopHit)	112
Colombia Airplay (National-Report)	1
Colombia Hot 100 (Billboard)	1
Colombia Streaming (Promúsica)	1
Costa Rica Airplay (FONOTICA)	9
Costa Rica Airplay (Monitor Latino)	4
Costa Rica Streaming (FONOTICA)	1
Croatia International Airplay (Top lista)	57
Dominican Republic Airplay (Monitor Latino)	5
Ecuador Airplay (Monitor Latino)	1
Ecuador Streaming (Promúsica)	1
El Salvador Airplay (ASAP EGC)	1
France (SNEP)	11
France Airplay (SNEP)	3
Germany (GfK)	14
Germany Airplay (MusicTrace)	29
Global 200 (Billboard)	1
Greece International (IFPI)	8
Guatemala Airplay (Monitor Latino)	9
Honduras Airplay (Monitor Latino)	4
Italy (FIMI)	5
Italy Airplay (EarOne)	3
Italy Latin Airplay (EarOne)	1
Jamaica Airplay (JAMMS)	7
Latin America (IFPI Latin America)	1
Lebanon (Lebanese Top 20)	15
Lithuania (AGATA)	21
Lithuania Airplay (TopHit)	181
Luxembourg (Billboard)	3
Mexico Airplay (Monitor Latino)	7
Mexico Streaming (AMPROFON)	1
Middle East and North Africa (IFPI)	18
Netherlands (Dutch Top 40)	28
Netherlands (Single Top 100)	32
New Zealand Hot Singles (RMNZ)	22
Nicaragua Airplay (Monitor Latino)	5
Nigeria (TurnTable Top 100)	96
North Africa (IFPI)	20
North Macedonia Airplay (Radiomonitor)	3
Panama International (PRODUCE)	1
Paraguay (IFPI Latin America)	1
Peru Airplay (Monitor Latino)	1
Peru Streaming (Promúsica)	1
Portugal (AFP)	5
Puerto Rico Airplay (Monitor Latino)	6
Romania Airplay (TopHit)	21
San Marino Airplay (SMRTV Top 50)	11
Singapore (RIAS)	20
Slovakia Singles Digital (ČNS IFPI)	29
Spain (Promusicae)	1
Spain Airplay (Promusicae)	1
Suriname (Nationale Top 40)	2
Sweden Heatseeker (Sverigetopplistan)	1
Switzerland (Schweizer Hitparade)	1
UK Singles (Official Charts)	97
United Arab Emirates (IFPI)	6
Uruguay (IFPI Latin America)	1
US Billboard Hot 100	6
US Hot Latin Rhythm Songs (Billboard)	1
US Hot Latin Songs (Billboard)	1
US Latin Airplay (Billboard)	1
US Latin Rhythm Airplay (Billboard)	1
US Rhythmic Airplay (Billboard)	4
Venezuela Airplay (Record Report)	1

=== Monthly charts ===
Monthly chart performance
Chart (2026)	Peak position
Panama Streaming (PRODUCE)	1
Paraguay Airplay (SGP)	1
Uruguay Streaming (CUD)	1

== Certifications ==
Certifications
Region	Certification	Certified units/sales
Portugal (AFP)	Gold	12,000^{‡}
Spain (Promusicae)	Platinum	100,000^{‡}
^{‡} Sales+streaming figures based on certification alone.

== Release history ==
List of release history, showing region, date, format and label
Region	Date	Format	Label	Ref.
Various	September 25, 2026	Digital download; streaming	Interscope; Bichota	
Italy	October 16, 2026	Radio airplay	Universal	

== See also ==
- 2026 in Latin music
- List of Latin songs on the Billboard Hot 100
- List of Billboard Hot 100 top-ten singles in 2026
- List of Billboard Hot Latin Songs and Latin Airplay number ones of 2026
- List of Billboard Global 200 number ones of 2026
- List of Billboard number-one Latin rhythm songs of 2026
- List of number-one singles of 2026 (Spain)
- List of number-one hits of 2026 (Switzerland)
