= Still (Karol G and Bruno Mars song) =

Single by Karol G and Bruno Mars

from the album No Me Arrepiento de Sentir Tanto
- Language: English
- Released: August 11, 2026
- Genre: Synth-pop
- Length: 3:40
- Label: Interscope; Bichota; Atlantic
- Songwriters: Carolina Giraldo Navarro; Peter Hernandez; Alexandra Yatchenko; Isabel LaRosa; Thomas LaRosa
- Producers: Karol G; Bruno Mars; Thomas; D'Mile (co.)

Karol G singles chronology
"Matadora" (2026)	"Still" (2026)	"Bby Wow" (2026)

Bruno Mars singles chronology
"On My Soul" (2026)	"Still" (2026)	"Dance with Me" (2026)

Music video
- Still on YouTube

"Still" is a song by Colombian singer-songwriter Karol G and American singer-songwriter Bruno Mars from Karol G's sixth studio album, No Me Arrepiento de Sentir Tanto (2026). Alongside the performers, the song was co-written by Alexandra Yatchenko, Isabel LaRosa, and Thomas LaRosa. Karol G, Mars, and Thomas produced the track with D'Mile co-producing it. Isabel and LaRosa had first sent a version of the song to Karol G, who identified with its lyrics. The song was then sent to Mars, who agreed to participate.

On August 11, 2026, "Still" was added to contemporary hit radio as the third single from the album in the United States. It is a synth-pop and 80s love power ballad, and is Karol G's first English-language song. The track features the duo harmonizing over a heartfelt reflection on love, heartbreak, vulnerability, and hope. It received mixed reviews from music critics. Some considered it an album highlight and praised Mars's vocals, while others criticized Karol G's English delivery and the song's message as formulaic.

"Still" debuted at number 41 on the US Billboard Hot 100 and peaked at number two on Crowley Brazil Latino Airplay. The song also achieved commercial success on Anglo Monitor Latino charts. Karol G and Mars have performed the track live twice. One time at the latter's Bellagio club, The Pinky Ring, and the other at SoFi Stadium as part of Karol G's Viajando Por el Mundo Tropitour (2026-27). The music video was directed by Pedro Artola and Daniel Ramos, and was recorded at SoFi Stadium in Los Angeles. It begins with black-and-white close-ups of their connection, before coming to life in full color, showing part of their live performance at SoFi Stadium in front of a crowd of 50,000 fans.

== Background and development ==
On July 29, 2026, Karol G announced her sixth studio album No Me Arrepiento de Sentir Tanto (2026), during a concert at Rogers Stadium in Toronto, revealing its cover art and confirming its release for August 7 of the same year. During the concert, she revealed that she had spent the "past couple of months" recording the album. The album's tracklist was revealed on August 5, in which "Still" was listed and American singer-songwriter Bruno Mars was announced as the song's featured artist. Mars re-shared Karol G 's post on their Instagram Stories and left a rose emoji in the comments.

Karol G spoke about her collaboration with Mars in a TikTok video. "There's a fully English song on the album, but I don't want it to be seen as simply my English-language track". She continued, "I've always embraced making music in different languages whenever it feels genuine. This song came into my life at exactly the right moment as it captured everything I was feeling, and I hope it resonates with many people." She also dedicated a message to Mars: "Thank you, Bruno Mars, for the magic in this song and for feeling it the way I did. You're incredible."

"Still" was written by Carolina Giraldo Navarro, Peter Hernandez, Alexandra Yatchenko, Isabel LaRosa, and Thomas LaRosa. It was produced by Karol G, Mars, Thomas, and co-produced by D'Mile. Mars also played drums and tambourine, while Thomas played the guitar and D'Mile performed the bass and piano. Joel Iglesias and Charles Moniz were the recording engineers, while Eli Heisler provided additional engineering. Serban Ghenea mixed the song alongside Bryce Bordone at MixStar Studios in Virginia Beach, with Ghenea serving as an assisting mixing engineer. Randy Merrill mastered the track at Sterling Sound, Edgewater, New Jersey.

== Writing and recording ==
Various publications noticed "Still" was Karol G's first track sung only in English. It became her first entirely English-language song from one of her albums, No Me Arrepiento De Sentir Tanto (2026). Nevertheless, she has previously sung entirely in English on Tiësto's collaborative single, "Don't Be Shy" (2021).

In an October 2026, Karol G told Interview that her collaboration with Mars stemmed from her desire to explore songwriting in English. In January, she approached Isabel LaRosa and her brother, Tomás, about writing a song together, sharing personal experiences that inspired them to write it for her. Wanting to give the song a more romantic and dramatic feel, Karol G agreed to Interscope Records chairman John Janick's suggestion to approach Mars, who accepted the collaboration. A week later, she traveled to London, attended his concert at Wembley Stadium and joined him at a recording studio at around 1 a.m., where they worked on the song through the night.Karol G recalled their immediate connection and said Mars had long admired her performance on The Tonight Show Starring Jimmy Fallon.

In a separate interview with Rolling Stone, Karol G said she had long considered recording music in English but had never pursued the idea. She said she connected with the lyrics when songwriters Isabel and Tomás LaRosa sent her the song, and chose to keep it in English rather than translate or adapt it. The song was then sent to Mars, who agreed to collaborate and contributed to its production. Mars also guided Karol G during the recording session, encouraging her to keep her accent while ensuring that her words remained clear.

Karol G said reaching an English-speaking audience was not the goal of the collaboration. She remains open to recording music in English in the future, but said she would do so when the right song came along rather than make an English-language album deliberately.

== Release ==
"Still" was initially released on August 7, 2026, through Interscope and Bichota Records, as the sixth track on Karol G's sixth studio album, No Me Arrepiento de Sentir Tanto (2026). New Music Server announced the track was serviced to US Pop radio on the same date. The track's official single release was formalized on August 11, 2026, being added to contemporary hit radio by Interscope and Atlantic. On August 18, 2026, the song was added to rhythmic contemporary radio stations by the aforementioned labels. On August 20, 2026, the track was given a distinct release on digital platforms, featuring a single-specific cover art. This transition was formally acknowledged by her record label, Bichota Records, through their official platforms. The song reached Italian radio stations on September 11, 2026, via Universal Music Group. On December 11, 2026, a 7-inch single in a translucent blue color and die-cut star-shape will be released via Karol G's and Mars's official websites by Interscope and Bichota Records.

== Composition ==
"Still"
A 21-second sample of "Still", where Karol G and Mars harmonize on the final chorus.

"Still" is a synth-pop and 80's love power ballad. Jessica Roiz from Billboard described the song as an "80s-inspired synthwave power ballad with a nostalgic, neon-drenched sound" as the duo harmonizes over its lyrics. Complex's Dimas Sanfiorenzo found the duet to be "80s-influenced emo", while Billboard's Isabela Raygoza dubbed it as a "nostalgic, '80s-inspired power-ballad sheen" with an "emotional hook".

The Latin Times found "Still" to be "an '80s-tinged duet about love that outlasts a breakup." HOLA! 's Shirley Gomez noticed that Mars smooth vocals blend effortlessly with Karol G's softer, "more restrained" delivery, creating a duet driven by emotion rather than "flashy production". Karol G and Mars exchange verses before joining forces on a "soaring chorus" that captures the struggle of letting go once a relationship ends.

Lyrically, "Still" offers a heartfelt reflection on love, heartbreak, and "lingering emotions". It is a departure from Karol G's "signature reggaeton and pop sound". The song depicts an "unconditional love despite no longer being together". The pair passionately sing, "I still love you even with a broken heart". "Still" conveys a familiar image of sleeping in an ex's sweater, framing heartbreak through themes of vulnerability and hope.

== Critical reception ==
"Still" received mixed reviews from music critics. Sanfiorenzo commented that the track was an "unexpected highlight" from the album, noticing the duo's undeniable chemistry shining throughout. Anna Sky Magliola, writing for Rayo, praised Karol G's vocals. María Munsuri, of Vogue Spain, called the song a "big surprise" reminiscent of Karol G's "covers on YouTube", such as "Killing Me Softly" (1972). Munsuri dubbed the collaboration "unexpected", but ultimately praised it as "more than convincing". Gomez labeled "Still" as one of the album's "emotional highlights" and that Karol G remains true to the heartfelt storytelling that has become a hallmark of her music, despite her international appeal.

During Billboard's "Five Burning Questions" segment, Lyndsey Havens highlighted Mars's abilities in downtempo collaborations. Cata Balzano affirmed that "Still" has Mars's "DNA in the rhythms and style", but praised Karol G's "versatility and ability to adapt". In a mixed review, Sigal Ratner-Arias appreciated Mars's vocals, but thought that it would have been more suitable for Karol G if sung in Spanish. However, she found that Karol G was able to display a different side "of her voice". Raygoza shared a similar view as she praised Mars's vocals, calling them "mesmerizing". Nevertheless, she was skeptical regarding Karol G's English delivery as it "may feel less natural". In a more negative review, Roiz first acclaimed the lyrics and harmonies, and found the "power ballad approach" a surprise and described the "Wedding Singer" feeling it had.

In a ranking of all 14 tracks from the album No Me Arrepiento de Sentir Tanto, Roiz placed "Still" at number 11. Pitchfork's Maria Nenet Barrios criticized the "drenched in chintzy synths" song, as its message of healing and moving forward comes across as more formulaic than emotionally lasting. Barrios felt the collaboration fell short when compared to the track "Bby Wow" with Judeline and Rusowsky.

== Commercial performance ==
"Still" was the album's highest-charting track in the United States, on the Billboard Hot 100 at number 41 and 124 on the Billboard Global 200 charts. The single reached inside the top twenty of the US Adult Pop Airplay and peaked at number 21 on Rhythmic Airplay. The song also peaked at number two on Crowley Brazil Latino Airplay, and at number four on Monitor Latino's Ecuador Anglo Airplay and Honduras Anglo Airplay. "Still" achieved commercial success on other Anglo Monitor Latino charts, peaking at number six in Argentina, the Dominican Republic, and in Central America. The single also reached the top 10 of various other countries, including Costa Rica, El Salvador and Uruguay. The song peaked at number 13 on the Billboard Japan Hot Overseas. It peaked at number 22 and 35 on the Poland Airplay and Dutch Top 40 charts, respectively.

== Music video ==
On August 15, 2026, before the debut live performance of "Still", a message on the giant video screen at SoFi Stadium, Los Angeles, announced that the performance would be filmed for the official music video of the song. The music video was directed by Pedro Artola and Daniel Ramos. The video starts with black-and-white close-ups showing their emotional connection, including silhouette moments backstage, couch chats, driving a utility cart inside the venue, and rehearsing on stage, which match the track's theme. The scene then comes to life in full color, showing part of their live performance at SoFi Stadium in front of a crowd of over 50,000 fans.

== Live performances ==
On August 5, 2026, Karol G and Mars debuted their duet during a performance at the latter's Bellagio club, The Pinky Ring. On August 15, 2026, Mars made a surprise cameo to sing "Still" with Karol G for the first time during the latters's second date of three headlining tour dates at the SoFi Stadium as part of her Viajando Por el Mundo Tropitour (2026-27), in Los Angeles. During the performance, Karol G wore a "sparkling white dress", while Mars wore a "flower-embroidered white suit with a matching cowboy hat". Mars also performed a segment of the song during The Romantic Tour (2026-27).

== Credits and personnel ==
Credits adapted from Spotify digital single liner notes.

- Mixed at MixStar Studios, Virginia Beach
- Mastered at Sterling Sound, Edgewater, New Jersey

=== Personnel ===
- Karol G – vocals, songwriting, production
- Bruno Mars – vocals, songwriting, production, drums, tambourine
- Alexandra Yatchenko – songwriting
- Isabel LaRosa – songwriting
- Thomas LaRosa – songwriting, production, guitar
- D'Mile – co-production, bass, piano
- Joel Iglesias – engineering
- Charles Moniz – engineering
- Eli Heisler – additional engineering
- Serban Ghenea – mixing engineer
- Bryce Bordone – mixing second engineer
- Randy Merrill – mastering engineer

== Charts ==
=== Weekly charts ===
Weekly chart performance
Chart (2026)	Peak position
Argentina Anglo Airplay (Monitor Latino)	6
Belarus Airplay (TopHit)	193
Brazil Airplay (Crowley)	120
Brazil Latino Airplay (Crowley)	2
Canada Hot AC (Billboard)	32
Central America Anglo Airplay (Monitor Latino)	6
Colombia Anglo Airplay (Monitor Latino)	12
Costa Rica Anglo Airplay (Monitor Latino)	7
Dominican Republic Anglo Airplay (Monitor Latino)	6
Ecuador Anglo Airplay (Monitor Latino)	4
El Salvador Anglo Airplay (Monitor Latino)	8
Estonia Airplay (TopHit)	42
Global 200 (Billboard)	124
Guatemala Anglo Airplay (Monitor Latino)	16
Honduras Anglo Airplay (Monitor Latino)	4
Italy Airplay (EarOne)	36
Japan Hot Overseas (Billboard Japan)	13
Latin America Anglo Airplay (Monitor Latino)	8
Netherlands (Dutch Top 40)	35
Netherlands (Single Tip)	16
Panama International (PRODUCE)	22
Poland Airplay (OLiS)	22
Puerto Rico Anglo Airplay (Monitor Latino)	12
San Marino Airplay (SMRTV Top 50)	23
Suriname (Nationale Top 40)	19
UK Singles Sales (Official Charts)	99
Uruguay Anglo Airplay (Monitor Latino)	10
US Billboard Hot 100	41
US Adult Pop Airplay (Billboard)	19
US Pop Airplay (Billboard)	26
US Rhythmic Airplay (Billboard)	21
Venezuela Airplay (Record Report)	40

=== Monthly charts ===
Monthly chart performance
Chart (2026)	Peak position
Estonia Airplay (TopHit)	54

== Release history ==
List of release history, showing region, date, format and label
Region	Date	Format	Label	Ref.
United States	August 11, 2026	Contemporary hit radio	Interscope; Atlantic	
United States	August 18, 2026	Rhythmic contemporary radio	Interscope; Atlantic	
Various	August 20, 2026	Digital download; streaming	Interscope; Bichota	
Italy	September 11, 2026	Radio airplay	Universal	
Various	December 11, 2026	7-inch single	Interscope; Bichota	
