= Bodhiria =

Studio album by Judeline
- Released: 25 October 2024
- Length: 30:50
- Language: Spanish
- Label: Interscope
- Producers: Tuiste; Mayo; Ralphie Choo; Rusowsky; Drummie; Louis Amoeba; Rob Bisel; Browni; Zulu; Saint Lowe

Singles from Bodhiria
- 1. "Mangata" Released: 10 April 2024; 2. "INRI" Released: 10 July 2024; 3. "Zarcillos de plata" Released: 19 September 2024

Bodhiria is the debut studio album by Spanish singer and songwriter Judeline, which was released on 25 October 2024, through Interscope Records. The album features guest appearances by Rusowsky, and Judeline's alter-ego, Angel-a.

== Background and promotion ==
In 2023, after gaining public attention with her singles "TÁNGER", "ZAHARA", "CANIJO", and "2+1", Judeline began working on her debut studio album. In several interviews and posts on her social media, she stated that she was working on her first studio album, which would have a conceptual and spiritual focus. During the process, the singer herself described the project as a deep exploration of her identity and themes such as love, spirituality, and introspection.

The album was gaining momentum from April 2024, with the release of the first single "mangata", where the artist fused elements of flamenco and trap. The second single arrived in July of that same year, under the title of "INRI". Finally, the third and final single would be released on 19 September, receiving acclaim from the public by becoming acclaimed on social networks, allowing the artist to get her first entry in the official sales list of Spain, reached position 67 and had a trajectory of 5 weeks on the list. On 10 October, Judeline announced the release date of the album and the list of twelve songs that make it up.

== Track listing ==
Bodhiria track listing
No.	Title	Writer(s)	Productor(es)	Length
1.	"Bodhitale" (featuring Angel-a)	Lara Fernández; Pablo Gómez Cano; Pablo López García; Rob Bisel; Andrés de las Heras; Juan Casado Fisac	Lara Fernández; Rob Bisel; Mayo; Tuiste; Drummie; Ralphie Choo; I-Ace; Lewis Peter Pickett	2:29
2.	"INRI"	Lara Fernández; Pablo Gómez Cano; Pablo López García; Jordi Moreno Márquez; Rob Bisel	Lara Fernández; Mayo; Tuiste; Browmi; I-Ace; Lewis Peter Pickett; Rob Bisel	2:25
3.	"AngelA"	Lara Fernández; Pablo Gómez Cano; Pablo López García; Jorge Muñoz Sanchez; Rob Bisel; Luis P. Ayuso	Lara Fernández; Rob Bisel; Tuiste; Mayo; Saint Lowe; Louis Amoeba; I-Ace; Lewis Peter Pickett	2:55
4.	"Mangata"	Lara Fernández; Pablo Gómez Cano; Pablo López García; Louis Amoeba; Rob Bisel; Andrés de las Heras	Lara Fernández; Louis Amoeba; Rob Bisel; Mayo; Tuiste; Drummie; Lewis Peter Pickett	3:03
5.	"¡BRUJERÍA!"	Lara Fernández; Pablo Gómez Cano; Pablo López García; Jorge Muñoz Sanchez; Jordi Moreno Márquez	Lara Fernández; Mayo; Tuiste; Browni; Saint Lowe; I-Ace; Lewis Peter Pickett	2:45
6.	"Luna roja"	Lara Fernández; Pablo Gómez Cano; Pablo López García; Rob Bisel; Jorge Muñoz Sanchez; Luis P. Ayuso	Lara Fernández; Rob Bisel; Tuiste; Mayo; Saint Lowe; Louis Amoeba; I-Ace; Lewis Peter Pickett	3:18
7.	"JOROPO"	Lara Fernández; Pablo Gómez Cano; Pablo López García; Roberto Gutierrez Acosta; Javier Fernández Blanco; Andrés de las Heras	Lara Fernández; Roberto Gutierrez Acosta; Tuiste; Mayo; Drummie; I-Ace; Lewis Peter Pickett	2:25
8.	"4esquinitas"	Lara Fernández; Juan Casado Fisac; Pablo Gómez Cano; Andrés de las Heras	Lara Fernández; Ralphie Choo; Drummie; Mayo; Lewis Peter Pickett	1:05
9.	"4 angelitos"	Lara Fernández; Andrés de las Heras; Juan Casado Fisac; Pablo Gómez Cano	Lara Fernández; Ralphie Choo; Drummie; Mayo; I-Ace; Lewis Peter Pickett; Rob Bisel	2:37
10.	"Heavenly" (with Rusowsky)	Lara Fernández; Andrés de las Heras; Juan Casado Fisac; Pablo Gómez Cano	Lara Fernández; Rusowsky; Ralphie Choo; Mayo; I-Ace; Lewis Peter Pickett	2:25
11.	"Zarcillos de plata"	Lara Fernández; Pablo López García; Pablo Gómez Cano; Yinka Bankole; Simon Hessman; Rob Bisel	Lara Fernández; Simon Hessman; Mayo; Tuiste; Fwdslxsh; Lewis Peter Pickett; Rob Bisel	3:18
12.	"Es Dios bueno o sólo es poderoso"	Lara Fernández; Pablo López García; Pablo Gómez Cano	Lara Fernández; Mayo; Tuiste; I-Ace; Lewis Peter Pickett	2:05
Total length:				30:50

== Charts ==
Chart performance for Bodhiria
Chart (2024)	Peak position
Spanish Albums (Promusicae)	3

== Release history ==
Release dates and formats for Bodhiria
Region	Date	Format(s)	Label	Ref.
Various	25 October 2024	Streaming; digital download	Interscope	
Spain	10 February 2025	CD; LP	Interscope	
