= List of number-one hits of 2026 (Switzerland) =

This is a list of the Swiss Hitparade number-one hits of 2026.

== Chart history ==
Issue date	Song	Artist	Ref.	Album	Artist	Ref.
4 January	"The Fate of Ophelia"	Taylor Swift		Lux	Rosalía	
11 January	"The Fate of Ophelia"	Taylor Swift		Lux	Rosalía	
18 January	"The Fate of Ophelia"	Taylor Swift		M.I.L.S IV	Ninho	
25 January	"The Fate of Ophelia"	Taylor Swift		Don't Be Dumb	ASAP Rocky	
1 February	"The Fate of Ophelia"	Taylor Swift		Megadeth	Megadeth	
8 February	"The Fate of Ophelia"	Taylor Swift		Octane	Don Toliver	
15 February	"DTMF"	Bad Bunny		Debí Tirar Más Fotos	Bad Bunny	
22 February	"DTMF"	Bad Bunny		Debí Tirar Más Fotos	Bad Bunny	
1 March	"DTMF"	Bad Bunny		Debí Tirar Más Fotos	Bad Bunny	
8 March	"DTMF"	Bad Bunny		The Mountain	Gorillaz	
15 March	"DTMF"	Bad Bunny		Kiss All the Time. Disco, Occasionally.	Harry Styles	
22 March	"Ordinary"	Alex Warren		Liebe Glaube Monster	Unheilig	
29 March	"Babydoll"	Dominic Fike		Arirang	BTS	
5 April	"Babydoll"	Dominic Fike		This Music May Contain Hope	Raye	
12 April	"Babydoll"	Dominic Fike		Arirang	BTS	
19 April	"Dracula"	Tame Impala		Arirang	BTS	
26 April	"Beauty and a Beat"	Justin Bieber featuring Nicki Minaj		Us üs wird nüt	Fischermätteli Hood Gäng and PVP	
3 May	"Beauty and a Beat"	Justin Bieber featuring Nicki Minaj		The Great Divide	Noah Kahan	
10 May	"Beauty and a Beat"	Justin Bieber featuring Nicki Minaj		Hit Me Hard and Soft	Billie Eilish	
17 May	"Beauty and a Beat"	Justin Bieber featuring Nicki Minaj		Debí Tirar Más Fotos	Bad Bunny	
24 May	"Billie Jean"	Michael Jackson		Iceman	Drake	
31 May	"Billie Jean"	Michael Jackson		Iceman	Drake	
7 June	"Hate That I Made You Love Me"	Ariana Grande		Trink aus! Wir müssen gehen	Die Toten Hosen	
14 June	"Dai Dai"	Shakira and Burna Boy		Forever	RAF Camora	
21 June	"Dai Dai"	Shakira and Burna Boy		You Seem Pretty Sad for a Girl So in Love	Olivia Rodrigo	
28 June	"Dai Dai"	Shakira and Burna Boy		Pndr.	L Loko and Drini	
5 July	"Dai Dai"	Shakira and Burna Boy		The Wow! Signal	Muse	
12 July	"Dai Dai"	Shakira and Burna Boy		Confessions II	Madonna	
19 July	"Dai Dai"	Shakira and Burna Boy		Foreign Tongues	The Rolling Stones	
26 July	"Dai Dai"	Shakira and Burna Boy		Eurosport 2	Dardan and Azet	
2 August	"Dai Dai"	Shakira and Burna Boy		Lounge Musik	Pashanim	
9 August	"Dai Dai"	Shakira and Burna Boy		Petal	Ariana Grande	
16 August	"Dai Dai"	Shakira and Burna Boy		This & That	Stray Kids	
23 August	"Dai Dai"	Shakira and Burna Boy		Fründschaft	Heimweh	
30 August	"Dai Dai"	Shakira and Burna Boy		Be	Shem Thomas	
6 September	"Dai Dai"	Shakira and Burna Boy		Timeless	Prince	
13 September	"Dai Dai"	Shakira and Burna Boy		Just Live Loud!	Shakra	
20 September	"Dai Dai"	Shakira and Burna Boy		Debí Tirar Más Fotos	Bad Bunny	
27 September	"Dai Dai"	Shakira and Burna Boy		15	Schwiizergoofe	
4 October	"Patient Zero"	Taylor Swift		WpointM	Tiakola	
11 October	"Dai Dai"	Shakira and Burna Boy		The Bligg Picture	Bligg	
18 October	"Bby Wow"	Karol G, Judeline and Rusowsky		Hände höch!	Stubete Gäng	
25 October	"Housewife"	Tate McRae		Dopamine Chamber	Fontaines D.C.	
1 November	"Housewife"	Tate McRae		From the Dark	Iommi	
8 November	"Housewife"	Tate McRae		Time Lab	Yello	
15 November	"Housewife"	Tate McRae		Requiem for a Village	Steven Wilson	
22 November	"Housewife"	Tate McRae		Carnaval de Luz	U2	
