= Matadora =

Single by Karol G

from the album No Me Arrepiento de Sentir Tanto
- Language: Spanish
- English title: "Killer"
- Released: July 24, 2026
- Genre: Reggaeton
- Length: 2:24
- Label: Interscope; Bichota
- Songwriters: Carolina Giraldo Navarro; Magnus August Høiberg; Marcos Efraín Masís; Lara Fernández Castrelo; Andrés Correa Ríos
- Producers: Karol G; Cashmere Cat; Tainy

Karol G singles chronology
"Después de Ti" (2026)	"Matadora" (2026)	"Still" (2026)

Visualizer
- "Matadora" on YouTube

"Matadora" (transl. "Killer") is a song by Colombian singer-songwriter Karol G. It was released on July 24, 2026, as the second single from Karol G's sixth studio album, No Me Arrepiento de Sentir Tanto.

== Composition ==
The song was written by Girado, Judeline, Andrés Correa Ríos with the production of Cashmere Cat and Tainy. In a interview for Rolling Stone, Girardo explained that the song referencse her everyday life and dealing with fame and her "embrace [of] female sensuality, especially because that has been so suppressed and frowned upon".

== Live performance ==
Karol G performed the song live for the first time on the opening day of the Viajando Por El Mundo Tropitour, on July 24, 2026, in Chicago, Illinois.

== Critical reception ==
Robin Murray of Clash described the song as "a reggaeton fuelled celebration of femme energy". Billboard's Sigal Ratner-Arias wrote that the song is an "old-school reggaetón track" which "reminiscent of her early days in urban music".

== Charts ==
=== Weekly charts ===
Weekly chart performance
Chart (2026)	Peak position
Chile (Billboard)	7
Colombia Hot 100 (Billboard)	13
Colombia Streaming (Promúsica)	13
Costa Rica Streaming (FONOTICA)	6
Ecuador Streaming (Promúsica)	9
El Salvador Airplay (ASAP EGC)	6
Panama Streaming (PRODUCE)	19
Peru (Billboard)	25
Spain (Promusicae)	32
US Billboard Hot 100	58
US Hot Latin Songs (Billboard)	3

=== Monthly charts ===
Monthly chart performance
Chart (2026)	Peak position
Panama Streaming (PRODUCE)	40
