= List of number-one albums of 2026 (Spain) =

Top 100 España is a record chart published weekly by PROMUSICAE (Productores de Música de España), a non-profit organization composed of Spanish and multinational record companies. This association tracks both physical (including CDs and vinyl) and digital (digital download and streaming) record consumption and sales in Spain.

== Albums ==
Week	Chart date	Album	Artist(s)	Ref
1	December 26	Lux	Rosalía	
2	January 2	Lux	Rosalía	
3	January 9	Daisy	Rusowsky	
4	January 16	El Día Que Me Olvides	Walls	
5	January 23	How Did I Get Here?	Louis Tomlinson	
6	January 30	Debí Tirar Más Fotos	Bad Bunny	
7	February 6	Debí Tirar Más Fotos	Bad Bunny	
8	February 13	Debí Tirar Más Fotos	Bad Bunny	
9	February 20	Por Si Mañana No Estoy	Omar Courtz	
10	February 27	Por Si Mañana No Estoy	Omar Courtz	
11	March 6	Kiss All the Time. Disco, Occasionally	Harry Styles	
12	March 13	Por Si Mañana No Estoy	Omar Courtz	
13	March 20	Arirang	BTS	
14	March 27	Arirang	BTS	
15	April 3	Por Si Mañana No Estoy	Omar Courtz	
16	April 10	Por Si Mañana No Estoy	Omar Courtz	
17	April 17	De un Siglo Anterior	Bunbury	
18	April 24	El Baifo	Quevedo	
19	May 1	El Baifo	Quevedo	
20	May 8	El Baifo	Quevedo	
21	May 15	El Baifo	Quevedo	
22	May 22	El Baifo	Quevedo	
23	May 29	El Baifo	Quevedo	
24	June 5	El Baifo	Quevedo	
25	June 12	You Seem Pretty Sad for a Girl So in Love	Olivia Rodrigo	
26	June 19	El Baifo	Quevedo	
27	June 26	El Baifo	Quevedo	
28	July 3	Confessions II	Madonna	
29	July 10	El Baifo	Quevedo	
30	July 17	El Baifo	Quevedo	
31	July 24	El Baifo	Quevedo	
32	July 31	Petal	Ariana Grande	
33	August 7	El Baifo	Quevedo	
34	August 14	El Baifo	Quevedo	
35	August 21	El Baifo	Quevedo	
36	August 28	El Baifo	Quevedo	
37	September 4	El Baifo	Quevedo	
38	September 11	El Baifo	Quevedo	
39	September 18	El Baifo	Quevedo	
40	September 25	El Baifo	Quevedo	
41	October 2	Manufacturas del club de la gente sola	Arde Bogotá	
42	October 9	Sordo de un pie	Lucho RK	
43	October 16	Sordo de un pie	Lucho RK	
44	October 23	Sordo de un pie	Lucho RK	
45	October 30	Sordo de un pie	Lucho RK	
46	November 6	Flipenses	La Pantera	
