= No Me Arrepiento de Sentir Tanto =

Studio album by Karol G
- Released: August 7, 2026
- Recorded: 2026
- Length: 42:54
- Languages: Spanish; English
- Labels: Bichota; Interscope
- Producers: Edgar Barrera; Bruno Mars; Cashmere Cat; D'Mile; Omer Fedi; Greg Gonzalez; Judeline; Karol G; Keityn; Oklou; Ovy on the Drums; Rusowsky; Sky Rompiendo; Thomas; Tyler Spry; Taiko; Tainy

Karol G chronology
Tropicoqueta (2025)	No Me Arrepiento de Sentir Tanto (2026)

Singles from No Me Arrepiento de Sentir Tanto
- 1. "Después de Ti" Released: April 23, 2026; 2. "Matadora" Released: July 24, 2026; 3. "Still" Released: August 11, 2026; 4. "Bby Wow" Released: September 25, 2026

No Me Arrepiento de Sentir Tanto (transl. I Don't Regret Feeling So Much) is the sixth studio album by Colombian singer Karol G. It was released on August 7, 2026, through Bichota Records and Interscope Records. It features guest appearances from Drake, Bruno Mars, Judeline, Rusowsky and Greg Gonzalez. The album debuted at number eight on the Billboard 200, peaking at one on the Top Latin Albums chart.

== Background ==
Following the release of her fifth studio album, Tropicoqueta, Karol G released multiple singles from the album, including "Papasito" among others and "Única", a collaboration with Tainy.

On April 12, 2026, Giraldo performed at the 2026 Coachella Valley Music and Arts Festival, where "Después de Ti" with Greg Gonzalez was performed. On April 21, 2026, Karol G announced her fourth solo concert tour, the Viajando Por El Mundo Tropitour. "Despúes de Ti" was released on April 23, 2026, without any previous announcement, as the album's lead single. On July 23, 2026, a day before Giraldo embarked on the tour, "Matadora" was announced and was released the following day, on July 24, 2026, coinciding with the start of the tour.

On July 29, 2026, Karol G announced the album, revealing its release day and cover art. The announcement took place during a concert at Rogers Stadium in Toronto, where Karol G revealed that she had spent the "past couple of months" "locked away" recording the album. On August 5, 2026, the track list was revealed.

"Still" transition to an official single was formalized on August 11, 2026, when it was first included in radio add reports. On August 20, 2026, the track was given a distinct release on digital platforms, featuring a single-specific cover art. This transition was acknowledged by her record label, Bichota Records, through their official platforms. On September 25, 2026, "Bby Wow" was released as an official single on digital platforms, with a specific single cover.

== Concept ==
When revealing its release, Karol G described the album as one that "opens a door for my fans to a more intimate Carolina". She stated:

When I did the Playboy photoshoot this year, they asked me: "What don’t people know about you?". I said, "People know everything about me. I'm a public figure, and that’s just how it is. I share a lot." But we all keep something that is only ours and that exists in our room at night, lying in bed, staring at the ceiling, listening to music. Just existing.

— Karol G explaining what the album represents.

The inspiration for the album began in November 2025, when Karol G embarked on solo hikes through the mountains of Hawaii. She stated the experience taught her about loneliness and isolation within the music industry. Giraldo encouraged her fans to listen to it "in their own rooms and see what comes up for them", reflecting the atmosphere in which it was recorded, with "little lights", "candles", and "incense".

In an interview with Rolling Stone, Giraldo revealed that the album had been done "for months", but didn't release as she was waiting for "the right time", stating: "This album has been ready for a long time, but to be honest, I didn’t want it to feel like I was exploiting a personal situation. I didn’t want it to feel like this album was part of some marketing campaign. It was very personal to me. It was so personal that I didn’t even feel ready to release it." She further stated that the album was released to connect with the listener, adding: "If we limit ourselves and let ourselves go, "I don’t want to feel, I'm not going to fall in love, I'm not going to give myself the chance, I'm not going to speak up, I'm not going to say anything, then we're not going to live. Living is about feeling, feeling things, feeling every moment, and feeling it to the fullest."

== Commercial performance ==
In the United States No Me Arrepiento de Sentir Tanto debuted at number eight on the Billboard 200 with 50,000 equivalent album units, becoming Giraldo's fourth top ten album and her seventh career entries. The album also become Giraldo's fifth number one album on the Top Latin Albums.

In Spain the album debuted at number three on the Promusicae Top 100 Álbumes, becoming her fifth top ten album.

== Accolades ==
Awards and nominations for No Me Arrepiento de Sentir Tanto
Year	Ceremony	Category	Result	Ref.
2026	Billboard Latin Music Awards	Latin Pop Album of the Year	Nominated	

== Track listing ==
No Me Arrepiento de Sentir Tanto track listing
No.	Title	Writer(s)	Producer(s)	Length
1.	"Te Llevas To'"	Carolina Giraldo Navarro; Andrés Correa Rios; Lara Fernández Castrelo; Marco Masís	Karol G; Tainy	2:30
2.	"Maybe"	Giraldo; Alejandro Ramírez; Nicolás Jaña Galleguillos	Sky Rompiendo^{[p]}; Taiko	2:24
3.	"Bebiendo Lágrimas"	Giraldo; Kevyn Cruz Monero; Daniel Echavarría Oviedo	Ovy on the Drums	3:00
4.	"Ahí" (with Drake)	Giraldo; Aubrey Graham; Cruz; Echavarría	Karol G; Ovy on the Drums	2:56
5.	"Final Feliz"	Giraldo; Fernández; Tyler Spry; Marylou Mayniel	Karol G; Spry; Oklou	3:06
6.	"Still" (with Bruno Mars)	Giraldo; Peter Hernandez; Alexandra Yatchenko; Isabel LaRosa; Thomas LaRosa	Karol G; Bruno Mars; Thomas; D'Mile	3:40
7.	"Alguien Que Te Amaba"	Giraldo; Édgar Barrera; Pedro Astudillo	Barrera	3:14
8.	"Matadora"	Giraldo; Fernández; Correa; Masís; Magnus August Høiberg	Karol G; Tainy; Cashmere Cat	2:25
9.	"For U My Lova"	Giraldo; Corea; Masís; Barrera	Karol G; Tainy; Barrera; Joel Iglesias^{[c]}	3:27
10.	"Si Lo Ven"	Giraldo Navarro; Joel Iglesias; Cruz	Karol G; Keityn; Iglesias^{[a]}	2:42
11.	"Bby Wow" (with Judeline and Rusowsky)	Giraldo; Fernández; Ruslán Mediavilla; Correa; Masís; Omer Fedi	Karol G; Judeline; Rusowsky; Tainy; Fedi	3:45
12.	"Con Quién Andará?"	Giraldo; Cruz; Echavarría; José Luis Perales	Karol G; Ovy on the Drums	3:01
13.	"Eclipse"	Giraldo; Cruz; Echavarría	Karol G; Ovy on the Drums	2:09
14.	"Después de Ti" (with Greg Gonzalez)	Giraldo; Greg Gonzalez; Correa; Barrera	Karol G; Gonzalez	4:35
Total length:				42:54

=== Notes ===
- ^{^[p]} signifies a producer and vocal producer
- signifies a co-producer
- ^{^[a]} signifies an assistant producer

== Personnel ==
Credits are adapted from Tidal.

- Carolina Giraldo – vocals
- Dave Kutch – mastering (tracks 1–5, 7–14)
- Rob Kinelski – mixing (1–5, 8–14)
- Eli Heisler – additional mixing (1–5, 8–14), additional engineer (6)
- Joey Mora – engineering (1, 8, 11)
- Joel Iglesias – engineering (2, 4–7, 9, 10, 14); bass, drums, percussion (9)
- Ovy on the Drums – engineering (3, 4, 12, 13)
- Aubrey Drake Graham – vocals (4)
- Noel Cadastre – engineering (4)
- Edgar Barrera – drums, percussion (7, 9); engineering (7); bass, organ (9)
- Daniel Uribe – guitar (7, 9, 10)
- Carlos Zamora – bass guitar (7)
- Doug Emery – keyboards (7)
- Artemio Gómez – engineering (7)
- Tainy – bells, drums, percussion (9)
- Greg Gonzalez – guitar, engineering (14)
- Goody Grace – acoustic guitar (14)
- Christian Celaya – acoustic guitar (14)
- Henry Kwapis – acoustic guitar (14)
- Jeff Kite – keyboards (14)
- Jackson Dale – engineering (14)
- Ryan Tharayil – engineering (14)
- Charles Moniz – engineering (6)
- Serban Ghenea – mixing (6)
- Bryce Bordone – mixing (6)
- Luis Barrera Jr. – mixing (7)
- Paulo Uribe – additional mixing (7)
- Randy Merrill – mastering (6)

== Charts ==
Chart performance for No Me Arrepiento de Sentir Tanto
Chart (2026)	Peak position
Belgian Albums (Ultratop Flanders)	183
Belgian Albums (Ultratop Wallonia)	118
Canadian Albums (Billboard)	56
Dutch Albums (Album Top 100)	91
French Albums (SNEP)	101
Portuguese Albums (AFP)	34
Spanish Albums (Promusicae)	3
Swiss Albums (Schweizer Hitparade)	11
US Billboard 200	8
US Latin Pop Albums (Billboard)	1
US Top Latin Albums (Billboard)	1
