= Daisy (Rusowsky album) =

Studio album by Rusowsky
- Released: 23 May 2025
- Length: 38:46
- Language: Spanish
- Label: Warner
- Producer: Rusowsky

Singles from Daisy
- 1. "Sophia" Released: 30 January 2025; 2. "Altagama" Released: 13 March 2025; 3. "Bby Romeo" Released: 25 April 2025; 4. "Malibu" Released: 23 May 2025

Daisy is the debut studio album by Spanish singer Rusowsky. The album was released on 23 May 2025, by Warner Music. The album was produced by Rusowsky himself.

Daisy contains 13 songs and features collaborations with artists such as Jean Dawson, Las Ketchup, Ralphie Choo, Ravyn Lenae, Kevin Abstract, and La Zowi.

== Concept ==
The album is described as a concept album blending electronic pop, alternative reggaeton, and digital melancholy.

== Promotion ==
Warner Music released the album on 23 May 2025.

=== Singles ===
On 30 January 2025, Rusowsky released "Sophia," the first single from his debut album. On 13 March, he released the second single "Altagama". On 25 April, he released the third single "Bby Romeo", a collaboration with Ralphie Choo. On 23 May, coinciding with the release of the album, he released the fourth and final single, "Malibu", which went double platinum in Spain.

=== Touring ===
Later that July, Rusowsky performed at one of the Tiny Desk Concerts sessions. In the set, he presented new versions of "Johnny Glamour," "(Ecco)," and "Malibu," as well as "Sophia" and "Dolores." On 25 September, the Daisy Tour began at the Movistar Arena in Madrid.

== Track listing ==
Daisy track listing
No.	Title	Length
1.	"Kinki Fígaro" (featuring Jean Dawson)	2:18
2.	"Johnny Glamour" (featuring Las Ketchup)	2:21
3.	"Sophia"	3:04
4.	"Bby Romeo" (featuring Ralphie Choo)	3:18
5.	"Pink + Pink" (featuring Ravyn Lenae)	3:02
6.	"Altagama"	2:30
7.	"4 Daisy"	3:54
8.	"Malibu"	3:35
9.	"Liar?" (featuring Kevin Abstract)	3:25
10.	"(Ecco)"	3:26
11.	"Sukkkk!!" (featuring La Zowi)	1:43
12.	"Project tu culo"	2:48
13.	"99%"	3:22
Total length:		38:46

== Charts ==
=== Weekly charts ===
Weekly chart performance for Daisy
Chart (2025)	Peak position
Spanish Albums (Promusicae)	1

== Certifications and sales ==
Certifications for Daisy
Region	Certification	Certified units/sales
Spain (Promusicae)	Platinum	40,000^{‡}
^{‡} Sales+streaming figures based on certification alone.
