= Omega (song) =

2024 promotional single by Rosalía

Single by Rosalía featuring Ralphie Choo
- Language: Spanish
- Released: 25 September 2024
- Recorded: 2023
- Length: 2:49
- Label: Columbia
- Composers: Vila; Andrew Wyatt; David Rodriguez; Dylan Wiggins; Martin Moreno; Noah Goldstein; Sam Gold; Terius Gesteelde-Diamant
- Lyricists: Rosalia Vila; Juan Casado Fisac
- Producers: Rosalía; Ralphie Choo; Noah Goldstein; Dylan Patrice

Rosalía singles chronology
"New Woman" (2024)	"Omega" (2024)	"Berghain" (2025)

Ralphie Choo singles chronology
"Voycontodo" (2023)	"Omega" (2024)	"Eso Que Tú Llamas Amor" (2025)

Music video
- "Omega" on YouTube

"Omega" is a song recorded by Spanish singer Rosalía featuring Spanish singer Ralphie Choo. It was released on 24 September 2024 through Columbia Records as a "gift for her fans", coinciding with Rosalía's 32nd birthday.

The song's production was handled by both performers, alongside Dylan Patrice and Noah Goldstein. A Spanish-language love song with a slow 1990s guitar riff, "Omega" expresses finding what you searched for so long and the security with which the person loves.

== Background ==
After the release of her critical acclaimed third studio album, Motomami, in March 2022, Rosalía has collaborated with several prominent artists, including Björk on the charity single "Oral", Lisa from Blackpink on "New Woman", and Rauw Alejandro on the joint EP RR (2023).

Being asked about her upcoming studio album in an interview with Highsnobiety, she stated:

It's been a process. I've changed a lot, but at the same time, I'm still wrapping my head around the same things. It's like I still have the same questions and the same desire to answer them. I still have the same love for the past and the same curiosity for the future.

Rosalía began teasing something Omega-related through Instagram on 19 September. The title "Omega" sparked speculation about a possible connection to the legendary album released by Enrique Morente and the group Lagartija Nick as a tribute to Leonard Cohen in 1985. Three days later, she shared a voice note through her own WhatsApp channel singing some lyrics, and announced the song's release on 23 September. She premiered the song at a musical firework show in Barcelona that concluded La Mercè, the city's official local holiday, for which she curated its soundtrack. Televised through TV3, it included songs by Vybz Kartel, Peret, Arctic Monkeys, and Caroline Polachek, among others.

== Composition ==
"Omega" is a mid-tempo Spanish-language love song in the form of a ballad that runs for two minutes and forty-nine seconds. It was recorded "almost a year before" its release. The first recorded interaction between Rosalía and Choo happened in September 2023, when Rosalía shared the latter's album Supernova (2023) and its song "Voycontodo" on Instagram. She later stated that Supernova was her favorite album released in 2023. In January 2024, Rosalía posted a picture of her and Choo ice skating in Madrid.

The song opens with a dreamlike atmosphere characterized by keyboards, gentle guitar strums, and background voices. Rosalía's vocals introduce stanzas that reflect on themes of love and memory, including lines such as, “You and I lost among poppies / Your eyes shine, they are like two pistols / Tongues embrace, they are no longer alone / In my memory, you shot me.” This is followed by a semi-rap section where she asserts, “I don’t drink anymore, I don’t smoke / I don’t consume, and I flaunt it,” before reverting to a more melodic tone with, “You are the best / And before you, I was the worst.” In the chorus, Rosalía employs a high-pitched, emotive style, singing: “I have become sentimental / (You are my omega) / Before making you finish / (You are my omega),” accompanied only by acoustic guitar. Ralphie Choo then enters, first delivering lines in a trap style with autotuned vocals, followed by a reggaeton-influenced section. A flamenco drum roll precedes a return to the chorus, transitioning into a unique segment featuring hand claps, English vocal loops, and a synthetic backdrop. A moment of silence leads to a climax in which Rosalía expresses intense emotion amid repeated vocal phrases in English. In the concluding part, she sings over an keyboard backdrop.

The soundscape and visuals are reminiscent to the "Rusia-IDK" collective, a group of Spanish artists that includes Choo, aiming for a unique hip-hop-flamenco sound. The collective is heavily influenced by El Mal Querer, hence why "Omega" sounds closer to her second studio album than the more minimalist production of Motomami.

The title refers to the last letter of the Greek alphabet, which is often used to denote the last, the end, or the ultimate limit of a set. About its meaning, Rosalía has stated that: "Omega is the end, it is the celebration of having found what you wanted so much and the security with which one loves that makes you not want to be anywhere else but there".

== Music video ==
On 24 September, she shared a preview of the music video on Instagram, featuring her and Choo on a rollercoaster wearing a ushanka. The music video is directed by Stillz in Los Angeles, a frequent collaborator of Rosalía, directing several previous music videos including "Tuya", "Candy" and "La Noche de Anoche".

== Reception ==
La Vanguardia described the song as "a compilation of solemn ballads, pop delirium, urban music, and flamenco rhythm".

== Credits and personnel ==
Adapted from the credits on Tidal.

- Rosalía – vocals, songwriting, production
- Ralphie Choo – vocals, songwriting
- David Rodríguez – songwriting, production, recording engineer
- Noah Goldstein – songwriting, production, arranger
- Dylan Patrice – production, arranger
- Sam Gold – songwriting, guitar
- Andrew Wyatt – songwriting
- Dylan Wiggins – songwriting
- Martin Moreno – songwriting
- Terius Gesteelde-Diamant – songwriting
- Brian Lee – mastering engineer
- Joe Visciano – mixing engineer
- Andrés de las Heras – recording engineer

== Charts ==
Weekly chart performance for "Omega"
Chart (2024)	Peak position
Spain (PROMUSICAE)	8

== Release history ==
Release dates and formats for "Omega"
Region	Date	Format	Label	Ref.
Various	24 September 2024	Digital download; streaming	Columbia	
Italy	24 September 2024	Radio airplay	Sony Italy	
