= List of Billboard number-one Latin pop songs of 2026 =

Hot Latin Pop Songs and Latin Pop Airplay are charts that rank the top-performing Latin pop songs in the United States, published by Billboard magazine.

== Chart history ==
Chart history
Issue date	Hot Latin Pop Songs			Latin Pop Airplay		
Issue date	Title	Artist(s)	Ref.	Title	Artist(s)	Ref.
January 3	"La Perla"	Rosalía and Yahritza y su Esencia		"Coleccionando Heridas"	Karol G and Marco Antonio Solís	
January 10	"La Perla"	Rosalía and Yahritza y su Esencia		"Coleccionando Heridas"	Karol G and Marco Antonio Solís	
January 17	"La Perla"	Rosalía and Yahritza y su Esencia		"Coleccionando Heridas"	Karol G and Marco Antonio Solís	
January 24	"La Perla"	Rosalía and Yahritza y su Esencia		"Coleccionando Heridas"	Karol G and Marco Antonio Solís	
January 31	"La Perla"	Rosalía and Yahritza y su Esencia		"Coleccionando Heridas"	Karol G and Marco Antonio Solís	
February 7	"La Perla"	Rosalía and Yahritza y su Esencia		"Coleccionando Heridas"	Karol G and Marco Antonio Solís	
February 14	"Weltita"	Bad Bunny and Chuwi		"Canción Para Regresar"	Sebastián Yatra, Lucho RK, Belinda and Gente de Zona	
February 21	"Weltita"	Bad Bunny and Chuwi		"Coleccionando Heridas"	Karol G and Marco Antonio Solís	
February 28	"Weltita"	Bad Bunny and Chuwi		"Corazón"	Danny Ocean	
March 7	"Weltita"	Bad Bunny and Chuwi		"Coleccionando Heridas"	Karol G and Marco Antonio Solís	
March 14	"Weltita"	Bad Bunny and Chuwi		"Coleccionando Heridas"	Karol G and Marco Antonio Solís	
March 21	"Weltita"	Bad Bunny and Chuwi		"Coleccionando Heridas"	Karol G and Marco Antonio Solís	
March 28	"La Perla"	Rosalía and Yahritza y su Esencia		"Coleccionando Heridas"	Karol G and Marco Antonio Solís	
April 4	"La Perla"	Rosalía and Yahritza y su Esencia		"Coleccionando Heridas"	Karol G and Marco Antonio Solís	
April 11	"La Perla"	Rosalía and Yahritza y su Esencia		"Coleccionando Heridas"	Karol G and Marco Antonio Solís	
April 18	"La Perla"	Rosalía and Yahritza y su Esencia		"Coleccionando Heridas"	Karol G and Marco Antonio Solís	
April 25	"La Perla"	Rosalía and Yahritza y su Esencia		"Coleccionando Heridas"	Karol G and Marco Antonio Solís	
May 2	"La Perla"	Rosalía and Yahritza y su Esencia		"Algo Tú"	Shakira and Beéle	
May 9	"Después de Ti"	Karol G and Greg Gonzalez		"Algo Tú"	Shakira and Beéle	
May 16	"Después de Ti"	Karol G and Greg Gonzalez		"Algo Tú"	Shakira and Beéle	
May 23	"Lo Arriesgo Todo"	Bruno Mars		"Algo Tú"	Shakira and Beéle	
May 30	"Después de Ti"	Karol G and Greg Gonzalez		"Algo Tú"	Shakira and Beéle	
June 6	"Después de Ti"	Karol G and Greg Gonzalez		"Algo Tú"	Shakira and Beéle	
June 13	"Algo Tú"	Shakira and Beéle		"Algo Tú"	Shakira and Beéle	
June 20	"Tú Carcel"	Morat		"Tú Carcel"	Morat	
June 27	"Weltita"	Bad Bunny and Chuwi		"Tú Carcel"	Morat	
July 4	"Weltita"	Bad Bunny and Chuwi		"Tú Carcel"	Morat	
July 11	"Weltita"	Bad Bunny and Chuwi		"Tú Carcel"	Morat	
July 18	"Weltita"	Bad Bunny and Chuwi		"Tú Carcel"	Morat	
July 25	"Después de Ti"	Karol G and Greg Gonzalez		"Dodis"	Xavi	
August 1	"Después de Ti"	Karol G and Greg Gonzalez		"Dodis"	Xavi	
August 8	"Superestrella"	Aitana		"Dodis"	Xavi	
August 15	"Te Estoy Correteando"	Latin Mafia		"Dodis"	Xavi	
August 22	"Te Llovas to"	Karol G		"Dodis"	Xavi	
August 29	"Te Estoy Correteando"	Latin Mafia		"Dodis"	Xavi	
September 5	"Te Estoy Correteando"	Latin Mafia		"Dodis"	Xavi	
September 12	"Te Estoy Correteando"	Latin Mafia		"Dodis"	Xavi	
September 19	"Te Estoy Correteando"	Latin Mafia		"Para Que Seas Feliz	Ricardo Montaner	
September 26	"Te Estoy Correteando"	Latin Mafia		"Para Que Seas Feliz	Ricardo Montaner	
October 3	"Te Estoy Correteando"	Latin Mafia		"Para Que Seas Feliz	Ricardo Montaner	
October 10	"Te Estoy Correteando"	Latin Mafia		"Para Que Seas Feliz	Ricardo Montaner	
October 17	"Te Estoy Correteando"	Latin Mafia		"Desde Que te Tengo"	Carín León	
October 24	"Te Estoy Correteando"	Latin Mafia		"Desde Que te Tengo"	Carín León	
October 31	"Te Estoy Correteando"	Latin Mafia		"Desde Que te Tengo"	Carín León	
November 7	"Te Estoy Correteando"	Latin Mafia		"Desde Que te Tengo"	Carín León	
November 14	"Te Estoy Correteando"	Latin Mafia		"Desde Que te Tengo"	Carín León	
November 21	"Te Estoy Correteando"	Latin Mafia		"Desde Que te Tengo"	Carín León	
