= Después de Ti =

2026 single by Karol G and Greg Gonzalez

Single by Karol G and Greg Gonzalez

from the album No Me Arrepiento de Sentir Tanto
- Language: Spanish
- English title: "After You"
- Released: April 23, 2026
- Genre: Dream pop
- Length: 4:35 (single ver.); 4:28 (album ver.)
- Label: Interscope; Bichota
- Songwriters: Carolina Giraldo Navarro; Gregory Steven Gonzalez; Andrés Jael Correa Ríos; Édgar Barrera
- Producers: Karol G; Greg Gonzalez

Karol G singles chronology
"Ivonny Bonita" (2025)	"Después de Ti" (2026)	"Matadora" (2026)

Greg Gonzalez singles chronology
"The Rose You Kept" (2022)	"Después de Ti" (2026)

Visualizer
- "Después de Ti" on YouTube

"Después de Ti" (transl. "After You") is a song performed by Colombian singer Karol G and American singer-songwriter Greg Gonzalez, the vocalist and guitarist of the band Cigarettes After Sex. It was released on April 23, 2026, through Interscope and Bichota Records, as the lead single from her sixth studio album, No Me Arrepiento de Sentir Tanto. Both Giraldo and Gonzalez produced the track, and wrote it alongside Andrés Jael Correa Ríos and Édgar Barrera.

Both artists acknowledged each other's work a year prior to working on "Después de Ti", which was recorded at Gonzalez's house at Giraldo's request. A dream pop ballad that was also mixed by Rob Kinelski and mastered by Dave Kutch, the song showcases a shift in Giraldo's usual musical style, relying on soft guitars and minimalist production provided by Gonzalez, Lyrically, it revolves around the absence of an old lover, the remembrance of a breakup and the difficulty of adjusting to it.

Both artists first performed "Después de Ti" at Giraldo's headling Coachella 2026 set on April 12, 2026. After its official release, which was accompanied by an audio visualizer of stars against a blue background, the song debuted at number 96 on the US Billboard Hot 100, making it Gonzalez's first appearance on the chart. It also topped the US Hot Latin Pop Songs chart and peaked at number 84 on the Colombia Hot 100.

== Background and release ==
Before the release of "Después de Ti", Karol G and Greg Gonzalez were both aware that they were fans of each other's music. In an interview with Selena Gomez for Complex, Giraldo also named Cigarettes After Sex as an influence. A few months later, Giraldo contacted Gonzalez requesting him to produce "Después de Ti", a song she had written during that time, to which Gonzalez accepted, explaining to Billboard that he was "struck by the heartbreak and the beauty" of the track. They recorded "Después de Ti" at Gonzalez's house, which had a bar and recording studio, in which Giraldo re-recorded her vocals, mentioning she "had never recorded this way, but she loved it".

On April 12, 2026, Giraldo performed as a headliner at the 2026 Coachella Valley Music and Arts Festival, where she performed "Después de Ti"—which was unreleased at the time—with Gonzalez for the first time. During the performance, both artists stood back to back, with Gonzalez providing the song's guitar arrangements. It was later released onto music streaming platforms on April 23, 2026, through Interscope and Bichota Records, as the lead single from Giraldo's sixth studio album No Me Arrepiento de Sentir Tanto (2026).

== Composition ==
"Después de Ti" is a melancholic dream pop ballad with influences from shoegaze and glam pop, marking a shift from Giraldo's usual style of reggaeton. Both Giraldo and Gonzalez wrote and produced the song, with Rob Kinelski mixing the song and Dave Kutch mastering it. The track runs at a length of four minutes and 35 seconds, and relies on a soft guitar arrangement and minimalist production, resulting in a much different sound compared to that of Karol G's fifth studio album, Tropicoqueta (2025), and Giraldo's vocals being more "intimate".

Along with the official song title, fans had also titled the song as "Me Haces Falta Tú" before its official release. Lyrically, the song is about no longer being with a loved one, and additionally revolves around the grief and remembrance of a breakup, as well as the difficulty of adjusting to a loved one's absence. Giraldo sings about such in the chorus, "Es que después de ti se me acabó la vida / No aprendo a vivir sin tu compañía", which translates to "The truth is, after you, my life came to an end / I cannot learn to live without your company".

== Critical reception ==
Jordi Bardají of Jenesaispop, who initially thought that "Después de Ti" was inspired by alternative pop band the Marías, stated that the track is an unsurprising collaboration "in commercial terms", although complimented Giraldo's fitting vocal performance and likened it as a Cigarettes After Sex song performed in Spanish. In a ranking of all 14 tracks from its accompanying album, No Me Arrepiento de Sentir Tanto, Jessica Roiz from Billboard ranked "Después de Ti" at number 12.

== Commercial performance ==
"Después de Ti" debuted at number 96 on the US Billboard Hot 100, number six on the Hot Latin Songs chart and peaked atop the Hot Latin Pop Songs chart, earning 3.8 million official streams and 1,000 downloads, becoming Gonzalez's first chart entries and first number-one entry on the latter chart, while it is Giraldo's third number-one entry on the latter chart. Following its inclusion on Giraldo's album No Me Arrepiento de Sentir Tanto, the song rose from number 17 to number 10 on the Hot Latin Songs chart, on the issue dated August 22, 2026. The song also peaked at number 71 on the Colombia Hot 100.

== Audio visualizer ==
An audio visualizer for "Después de Ti" was released on Karol G's YouTube channel on April 23, 2026. It is a looped video of stars against a blue background.

== Live performances ==
On April 12, 2026, both Giraldo and Gonzalez performed "Después de Ti" for the first time at the former's headlining 2026 Coachella Valley Music and Arts Festival set, initially being unreleased at the time. They both later performed it on August 14, 2026, the first of three headlining tour dates at the SoFi Stadium as part of Giraldo's Viajando Por el Mundo Tropitour, in Los Angeles.

== Charts ==
Chart performance for "Después de Ti"
Chart (2026)	Peak position
Colombia Hot 100 (Billboard)	71
US Billboard Hot 100	96
US Hot Latin Songs (Billboard)	6
US Hot Latin Pop Songs (Billboard)	1

== Personnel ==
Credits adapted from Apple Music.

- Karol G – vocals; songwriter, producer
- Greg Gonzalez – guitar; songwriter, producer, recording engineer
- Goody Grace – acoustic guitar
- Jeff Kite – keyboards
- Henry Kwapis – drums
- Christian Celaya – bass
- Andrés Jael Correa Ríos – songwriter
- Édgar Barrera – songwriter
- Joel Iglesias – recording engineer
- Ryan Tharayil – recording engineer
- Jackson Dale – recording engineer
- Pranav Chawla – assistant recording engineer
- Rob Kinelski – mixing engineer
- Eli Heisler – assistant mixing engineer
- Dave Kutch – mastering engineer

== See also ==
- 2026 in Latin music
- List of Billboard number-one Latin pop songs of 2026
