= Nilton César =

Brazilian musician (1939–2026)

- Born: June 27, 1939; Ituiutaba, Minas Gerais, Brazil
- Died: January 28, 2026 (aged 86) São Paulo, Brazil

Nilton César (June 27, 1939 – January 28, 2026) was a Brazilian singer known for hits such as "A namorada que sonhei", "Férias na Índia", "Professor apaixonado", "Espere um pouco, um pouquinho mais" and "Tudo passará".

== Life and career ==
Nilton César, the son of farmers, was born on June 27, 1939, and initially dedicated himself to his studies to manage the family business. He began his musical career in 1960, when he performed as a newcomer on television programs. His career breakthrough came in 1970 with the song "Férias na Índia".

César died on January 28, 2026, at the age of 86.

== Discography ==
- 1964 – Nilton César I (Continental)
- 1965 – Nilton César II (Continental)
- 1965 – Com Alma e Coração (Continental)
- 1966 – A Volta do Professor (Continental)
- 1968 – Dois Num Só Coração (RCA Victor)
- 1969 – Nilton César III (RCA Victor)
- 1970 – Nilton César IV (RCA Victor)
- 1971 – Nilton César V (RCA Victor)
- 1973 – Amor... Amor... Amor... (RCA Victor)
- 1974 – Nilton Cesár VI (RCA Victor)
- 1977 – Por Esse Amor Que Tu Me Dás (RCA Victor)
- 1979 – Meu Doce Bem (RCA Victor)
- 1981 – Palavras de Amor (RCA Vik)
- 1982 – Sensações (RCA Vik)
- 1984 – Nilton César VII (RCA Vik)
- 1987 – Só Por Essa Noite (Copacabana)
- 1990 – Nilton César VIII (Copacabana)
- 1993 – Nilton César IX (RGE)
- 1995 – Nilton César X (RGE)
- 2003 – O Homem Também Chora (Intercard Record)
- 2004 – No Limite da Paixão (Intercard Record)
