= Ralphie Choo =

Spanish singer-songwriter and producer (born 1998)

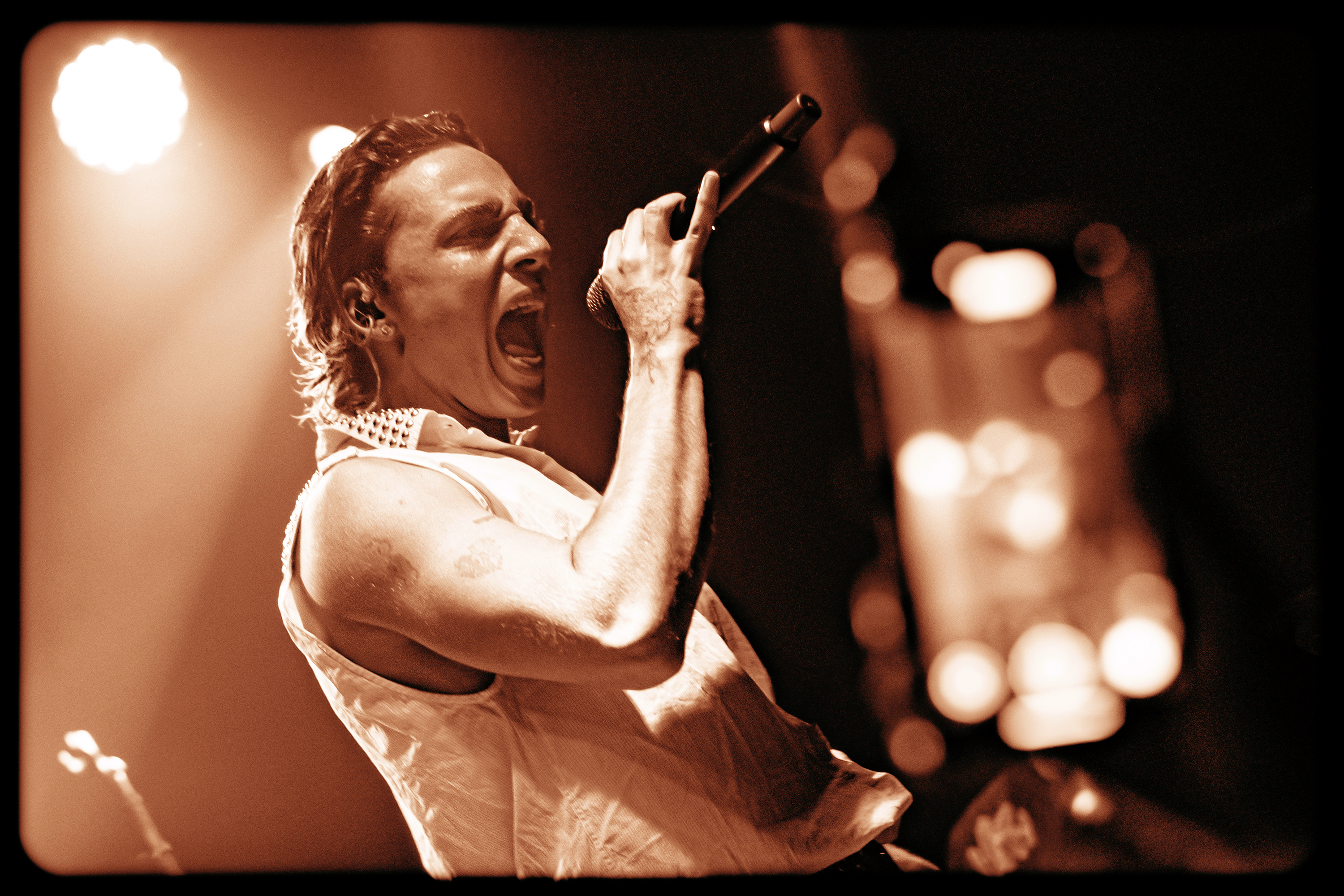
- Born: Juan Casado Fisac; 18 December 1998 (age 27); Madrid, Spain
- Occupations: Singer; songwriter; record producer
- Years active: 2019–present
- Musical career
- Origin: Madrid, Spain
- Genres: Urbano; bedroom pop; alternative; avant-pop
- Instruments: Vocals
- Label: Warner Music Spain
- Website: ralphiechoo.com

Juan Casado Fisac (born December 18, 1998), known professionally as Ralphie Choo, is a Spanish singer-songwriter and producer.

== Early life ==
Fisac was born in Madrid. He grew up in Daimiel, a small town in the province of Ciudad Real, in Castille-La Mancha after moving with his family from an early age. Although it is often cited that he studied a degree in chemical engineering before switching to music, this is a running myth that he has debunked publicly, citing his mother as the main reason for his decision to study Harmony and Musical Production.

His professional career began in 2019 when he started producing beats with friends after an ACL injury while playing soccer forced him to rest at home for two months. He began adding his vocals to original compositions in 2021. His stage name is a mix of The Simpsons character Ralph Wiggum and the series' Valentine's Day special "I Choo Choo Choose You”.

== Career ==
Inspired by the experimentalism of Internet-born music collectives such as Odd Future and PC Music, Ralphie Choo is a founding member of the artistic collective and label "Rusia-IDK", alongside Rusowsky, TRISTÁN!, DRUMMIE and Mori, who all met each other and grouped together online through their manager, Jubera. "Rusia-IDK" artists have a similar artistic vision, aiming to create a bold sound that combines hip-hop with flamenco and reggaeton.

Rosalía, "De aquí no sales"

Ralphie Choo, "Bulerías de un caballo malo"

Ralphie Choo's Bulerías de un caballo malo draws inspiration from Rosalía's use of vocal chops and "flamenco-electronica" as seen in "De aquí no sales"

Ralphie Choo's breakthrough occurred in 2022 with “BULERÍAS DE UN CABALLO MALO,” a track that draws inspiration from the flamenco-electronica fusion popularized by Rosalía in El Mal Querer. The song resonated with critics and attracted attention from labels such as 4AD, True Panther, and ultimately Warner Records, with which he signed.

In September 2023, Ralphie Choo launched his debut album, Supernova, which Pitchfork characterized as "bizarre and incongruous—but oddly satisfying." The album blends elements of R&B, hip-hop, reggaeton, and flamenco. It was named one of the best albums of 2023 by Variety.

In September 2024, Ralphie Choo collaborated with fellow Spanish singer-songwriter Rosalía on the single "Omega," released on September 25.

In October 2025, he released the single "Pirri", billed as the first preview of his next album; that same month he announced 2026 headline dates at Madrid's Movistar Arena (20 February 2026) and Barcelona's Sant Jordi Club (27 March 2026).

In November 2026, he released the single "El Hueso" as the lead single for his album Charmain "Le grand architecte", which is scheduled to release on February 26, 2027.

== Artistry ==
An "avant-pop prodigy" and a "musical rebel", Ralphie Choo has cited Frank Ocean, Rosalía, and Yung Lean as his major musical influences. A loyal consumer of American music, he was captivated by the bedroom pop scene of the United States. Inspired by artists like Rex Orange County and Clairo, he aimed to export the genre to the Spanish scene. He has also stated that his artistry delivers from the more “classical" and "flamenco view” of her mother and "punkier" side of his father, citing Outkast, OK Go, Choker, Kanye West, Oklou, Tyler, the Creator, Childish Gambino and Paco de Lucía as direct musical inspirations.

== Discography ==
=== Studio albums ===
List of studio albums, with selected details
Title	Details
Supernova	Released: 15 September 2023; Label: Warner Music; Format: CD, LP, digital download

=== As producer ===
Credits
Year	Title	Artist	Production	Songwriting	Technical
2022	Usted Está Aquí	Amore	check	check	
2022	"En El Cielo"	Judeline	check	check	
2023	Làgrimas Pa Otro Día	Dellafuente	check	check	
2024	"Nanai"	Amaia	check		
2024	"Omega"	Rosalía, Ralphie Choo	check	check	
2024	Bodhiria	Judeline	check	check	
