= Ahí (song) =

Song by Karol G and Drake

from the album No Me Arrepiento de Sentir Tanto
- Language: Spanish and English
- English title: "There"
- Written: December 31, 2025
- Released: August 7, 2026
- Recorded: January 2026
- Genre: Afrobeats
- Length: 2:56
- Label: Bichota; Interscope
- Songwriters: Carolina Giraldo; Kevyn Cruz; Daniel Echavarria; Aubrey Drake Graham
- Producers: Ovy on the Drums; Karol G

Visualizer
- "Ahí" on YouTube

"Ahí" (transl. "There") is a song by Colombian singer Karol G and Canadian singer Drake, from the former's sixth studio album No Me Arrepiento de Sentir Tanto (2026), which was released on August 7, 2026, through Bichota Records and Interscope Records. Both artists co-wrote the track alongside Ovy on the Drums, who co-produced the track alongside Giraldo, and Kevyn Cruz.

It is the first collaboration between both artists; initial rumors of this collaboration spread prior to the release of Drake's album Iceman, which claimed that Giraldo would appear on the album. They worked on the track within three days in January 2026, with Drake focusing primarily on his Spanish pronunciations. It peaked at number 44 on the US Billboard Hot 100, additionally peaking atop the US Hot Latin Songs chart and at number 103 on the Billboard Global 200.

== Background ==
In May 2026, during a lead-up to Canadian singer Drake's album Iceman, American radio host Charlamagne tha God claimed that Karol G would appear on the album; this rumor was based on a leaked version of "Ahí". On July 29, 2026, Karol G announced her sixth studio album No Me Arrepiento de Sentir Tanto (2026), revealing its release date as August 7 of the same year. Before releasing it, she revealed its tracklist, with "Ahí" with Drake listed as the 11th track.

Prior to any announcement of the collaboration, Giraldo wrote "Ahí" on December 31, 2025. At around the start of January 2026, she sent the song to Drake, who liked it. On January 8, representatives for Giraldo met with Drake's team and both artists worked on "Ahí" for three days; at this time, Drake had been working on Iceman in the Bahamas. During the recording session, in which both Giraldo and Drake were in the studio, as well as the latter's engineer, she helped him with the Spanish pronunciations.

== Music and lyrics ==
"Ahí" is an "upbeat, [...] melodic" dance-influenced Afrobeats and tropical song that blends pop and R&B melodies. It is the eighth track in which Drake sings or raps in Spanish, and is the first collaboration between both artists. "Ahí" sees both artists sharing verses about having a romantic interest in someone who is not ready for a relationship. Towards the end of the track, Drake interpolates a lyric from his own track, "New Bestie", in which he previously shouted-out Giraldo: "Yeah, I want a Latina, I want a Latina / I want a G like Karolina".

== Live performances ==
Drake and Karol G performed the song together for the first time in September 2026 at the Houston show on Karol G's No Me Arrepiento de Sentir Tanto Tour.

== Commercial performance ==
A week after its release, "Ahí" debuted atop three Billboard Latin charts, those being US Hot Latin Songs, US Hot Latin Rhythm Songs, and US Latin Streaming Songs, with 5.9 million streams in the United States. On the former chart the following week, "Ahí" fell from number one to four with 4.2 million streams; her other track, "Bby Wow" with Judeline and Rusowsky, replaced the track from the top position. It additionally peaked at number 44 on the US Billboard Hot 100, as well as number 103 on the Billboard Global 200, earning 11.8 million streams worldwide in its first week.

== Charts ==
=== Weekly charts ===
Weekly chart performance
Chart (2026)	Peak position
Argentina Airplay (Monitor Latino)	1
Bolivia Airplay (Monitor Latino)	13
Canada Hot 100 (Billboard)	86
Chile Airplay (Monitor Latino)	1
Colombia Hot 100 (Billboard)	31
Costa Rica Airplay (FONOTICA)	10
Costa Rica Airplay (Monitor Latino)	4
Costa Rica Streaming (FONOTICA)	13
Ecuador Airplay (Monitor Latino)	1
El Salvador Airplay (ASAP EGC)	8
Global 200 (Billboard)	103
Honduras Pop Airplay (Monitor Latino)	9
Latin America Latino Airplay (Monitor Latino)	2
Panama Streaming (PRODUCE)	37
Peru Airplay (Monitor Latino)	1
Puerto Rico Airplay (Monitor Latino)	14
Spain (Promusicae)	62
Suriname (Nationale Top 40)	22
US Billboard Hot 100	44
US Hot Latin Songs (Billboard)	1
US Hot Latin Rhythm Songs (Billboard)	1
US Latin Airplay (Billboard)	1
US Latin Rhythm Airplay (Billboard)	1
Venezuela Airplay (Record Report)	16

=== Monthly charts ===
Monthly chart performance
Chart (2026)	Peak position
Panama Streaming (PRODUCE)	73
Paraguay Airplay (SGP)	59
