= Asociación Salvadoreña de Productores de Fonogramas y Afines =

Salvadoran music industry trade association

- Abbreviation: ASAP EGC
- Type: Technical standards, licensing and royalties
- Legal status: Association
- Purpose: Trade organization protecting music production companies' interests
- Headquarters: San Salvador
- Location: El Salvador
- Affiliations: IFPI
- Website: www.asap-egc.org

The Asociación Salvadoreña de Productores de Fonogramas y Afines (ASAP EGC) (English: Salvadoran Association of Phonograph Producers and Related) is a non-profit organization and industry trade group integrated by multinational and national record companies in El Salvador composed of various Salvadoran corporations involved in the music industry. It serves as the affiliate member of the International Federation of the Phonographic Industry (IFPI) in the country and also serves as the national ISRC agency.

== History ==
ASAP EGC is a collective management society that represents the cultural music industry in El Salvador and for this it has a technical, professional and highly specialized organization. It is constituted as a non-profit association, its members are natural or legal people and represent the intellectual property rights of the most important labels of national and international record companies and independent phonographic producers. Being the national entity authorized to manage the rights of phonogram producers, ASAP is in charge of collecting related rights of songwriters. The also raise money to pay artist their royalties for the musical works. The royalty cheques are then handed out to the artist by Artistas Intérpretes o Ejecutantes de El Salvador, Entidad de Gestión Colectiva (ARIES E.G.C.).

According to the CNR, a total of 1,111 deposits were processed in 2015 in the country. Until July 28, 2016, they have exceeded 500 deposits of works in which literary works such as short stories, novels and poems, and artistic works such as paintings and sculptures are found; another large part are software. When talking about copyright, reference is made to the recognition that the State makes in favor of the creator of any artistic work.

== Music charts ==
ASAP publishes weekly music charts for the country as well as yearly charts as part of their annual newsletter.

== Music sales ==
Music consumption in El Salvador generated $4.1 million in revenue in 2020, according to data compiled by the International Federation of Phonogram and Music Video Producers (IFPI). Citing IFPI statistics, a report on neighboring rights by the ASAP EGC, points out that the music market in El Salvador grew by 7.3% in 2020 with annual revenues of $4.1 million, above the $3.8 million reported in 2019. This amount includes what was paid for services streaming, digital downloads and collective management. This last segment includes establishments open to the public, radio and television. The ASAP indicates that the main driver of the market is the sale in streaming format, since due to mobility restrictions in 2020 due to the COVID-19 pandemic, the Collective management revenues "have fallen dramatically" by -18.3% at the end of last year. Meanwhile, streaming music services alone accounted for $3.6 million (87.2% of what was generated by the industry), equivalent to 12.5% Variation This figure corresponds to 63% of revenue from subscriptions, 28% from advertising and 12% from videos.

== See also ==
- Monitor Latino
