= Judeline =

Spanish singer (born 2003)

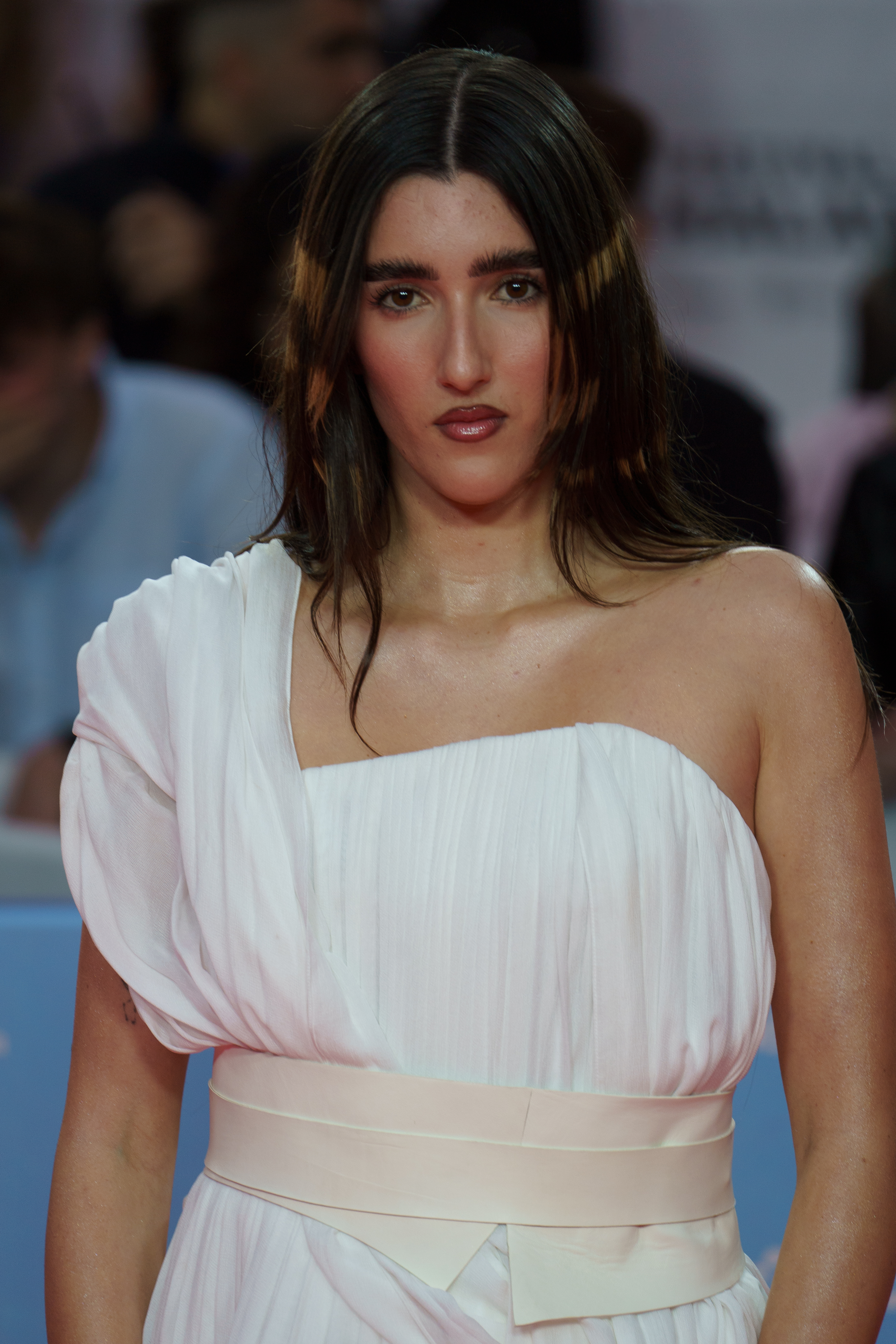
- Judeline at the 2025 Málaga Film Festival
- Born: Lara Fernández Castrelo; 18 January 2003 (age 23); Jerez de la Frontera, Cádiz, Andalusia, Spain
- Occupations: Singer; songwriter
- Years active: 2020–present
- Musical career
- Origin: Madrid, Spain
- Genres: Latin pop; indie
- Instruments: Vocals
- Label: Interscope
- Website: judeline.es

Lara Fernández Castrelo (born 18 January 2003), known professionally as Judeline, is a Spanish singer and songwriter. An artist primarily exploring indie pop with Latin influence, she started her career in 2020s at the age of 17 following a move to Madrid.

== Early life ==
Lara Fernández Castrelo was born on January 18, 2003 in Jerez de la Frontera, but predominantly spent her childhood in Barbate. Her mother is from Jerez de la Frontera, while her father originates from Madrid, although he spent part of his childhood in Venezuela.

== Career ==
=== 2020–present: Career beginnings and Bodhiria ===
In 2020, she moved to Madrid to complete her studies and eventually launched a successful music career. She has stated that her stage name is derived from her father's favourite song, "Hey Jude" by the Beatles. Her first collaboration was with singer Alizzz on his project Desclasificados in 2020.

Judeline independently released her first extended play in 2022 titled de la luz (transl. of the light). In 2023, she signed a record deal with Interscope Records. The same year, she released multiple singles including "TÁNGER", "ZAHARA", and "CANIJO", which further increased her notoriety in Spain.

In 2024, Judeline was invited by Colombian singer J Balvin to open the European dates of his Que bueno volver a verte Tour. That same year, she released two songs: "mangata", the first single from her debut album, and "Romero Santo", a collaboration with DELLAFUENTE included in his album Torii Yama. The following singles "INRI" and "zarcillos de plata" served to promote Bodhiria, her debut studio album released on 25 October 2024. That same month, she collaborated with Argentine rapper Duki on the track "Imperio", included in his album AMERI. The song entered the top 15 of the Spanish charts and reached the top 21 in Argentina. Also in 2024, she appeared as a guest coach on La Voz Kids for its ninth season, aiding coach Lola Índigo in making decisions for her team.

After releasing her debut album, she embarked on the Bodhiria Tour, performing in Spain, France, Belgium, Switzerland, England, the United States, Mexico, Colombia and Chile. In 2025, she performed on April 12 and 19 at the Coachella festival and released the single "TU ET MOI" featuring MC Morena.

== Personal life ==
In a 2025 interview with People, Judeline stated that growing up she was "the only atheist" in her Catholic school.

== Discography ==
=== Studio albums ===
List of studio albums, with selected details, and chart positions
Title	Details	Peaks
Title	Details	SPA
Bodhiria	Released: 25 October 2024; Label: Interscope; Format: CD, digital download, streaming, vinyl	3

=== Extended plays ===
List of extended plays, with selected details, and chart positions
Title	Details	Peaks
Title	Details	SPA
de la luz	Released: 14 January 2022; Label: none (self-released); Format: Digital download, streaming	
VERANO SAUDADE	Released: 12 December 2025; Label: Interscope Records; Format: Digital download, streaming	—

=== Singles ===
==== As lead artist ====
List of singles as lead artist, showing year released, chart positions, and originating album
Title	Year	Peaks	Certifications	Album
Title	Year	SPA	Certifications	Album
"Solo Quiero Huir" (prod. Trillfox)	2020	—	—	Non-album single
"De una Manera" (prod. Tuiste)	2020	—	—	Non-album single
"Nueva en la Ciudad" (prod. Oddliquor and Tuiste)	2021	—	—	Non-album single
"Sustancia" (prod. Mayo)	2021	—	—	Non-album single
"Otro Lugar • Despertar"	2021	—	—	De la Luz
"Marisucia • Noche"	2021	—	—	De la Luz
"En el Cielo"	2022	—	—	Non-album single
"La Pestaña Que Soplé"	2022	—	—	Non-album single
"TÁNGER" / "ZAHARA"	2023	—	—	Non-album single
"CANIJO"	2023	—	PROMUSICAE (SPA): Gold	Non-album single
"Soy el Único" / "La Tortura"	2023	—	—	Non-album single
"2+1"	2023	—	—	Non-album single
"mangata"	2024	—	—	Bodhiria
"Romero Santo" (with Dellafuente)	2024	35	—	Torii Yama
"INRI"	2024	—	—	Bodhiria
"zarcillos de plata"	2024	69	PROMUSICAE (SPA): Gold	Bodhiria
"TÚ ET MOI" (with Mc Morena)	2025	—	—	Non-album single
"chica de cristal"	2025	—	—	Non-album single
"Un puente por la Bahía, la Cruz del Campo" (with Yerai Cortés)	2025	—	—	Non-album single
"com você" (with Amaia)	2025	37	—	Non-album single
"La Falda"	2026	10	—	

==== As featured artist ====
List of singles as featured artist, showing year released, and originating album
Title	Year	Album
"Laberinto" (Quaiko featuring Judeline)	2020	Non-album single
"La del Rencoroso" (Vatocholo featuring Judeline)	2022	Non-album single
"Bby Wow" (Karol G featuring Judeline & Rusowsky)	2026	No Me Arrepiento de Sentir Tanto

=== Guest appearances ===
List of non-single guest appearances, showing year released, other artists, chart positions, and originating album
Title	Year	Other artists	Peaks		Album
Title	Year	Other artists	SPA	ARG	
"Rota"	2019	None	—	—	Desclasificados
"Si Preguntas por Mí"	2023	Tainy; Kris Floyd	—	—	Data
"De Serie"	2024	Taiko	—	—	Offside
"Imperio"	2024	Duki	15	21	AMERI
"Who Wants to Live Forever?"	2025	Nine Inch Nails	—	—	Tron: Ares

== Tours ==
=== Headlining ===
- Bodhiria Tour (2024–2026)

=== Opening act ===
- J Balvin - Que bueno volver a verte Tour (2024)

== Awards and nominations ==
Award	Year	Category	Nominated work	Result	Ref.
Latin Grammy Awards	2025	Best Alternative Music Album	Bodhiria	Lost	
Latin Grammy Awards	2025	Best Alternative Song	"Joropo"	Lost	
