= Rusowsky =

Spanish singer and songwriter (born 1999)

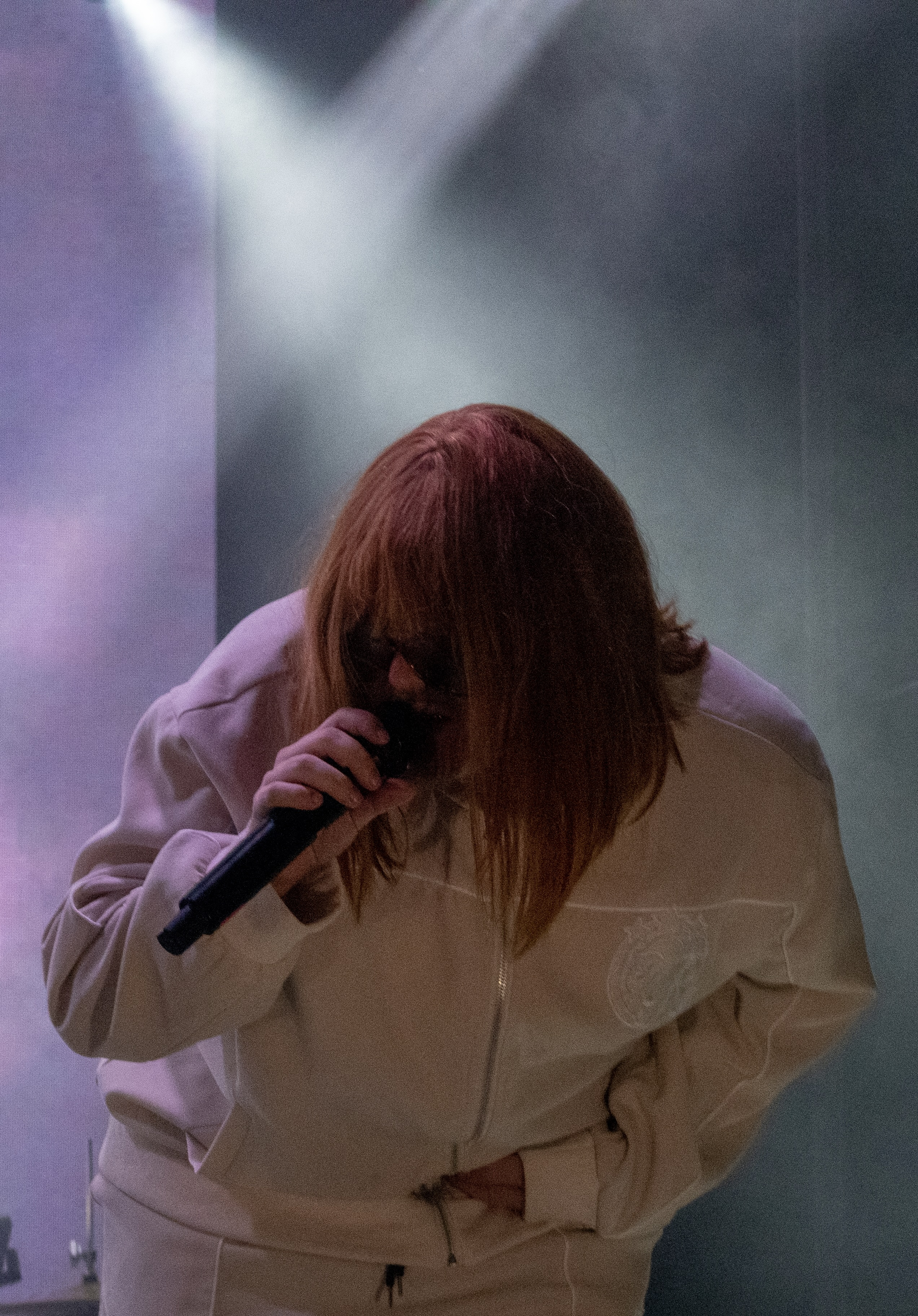
- Rusowsky performing in 2025

Background information
- Born: Ruslán Mediavilla Solovieva; 1999 (age 26–27); Valladolid, Spain
- Genres: Reggaeton; Latin trap; R&B; experimental; bedroom pop
- Occupations: Singer; songwriter; record producer
- Instruments: Vocals; piano
- Years active: 2019–present
- Label: Warner Music Group

Ruslán Mediavilla Solovieva (born 1999), known professionally as Rusowsky (stylized in all lowercase), is a Spanish singer, songwriter and record producer. His music explores underground and avant-garde genres such as bedroom pop, R&B, reggaeton, techno, hip hop and jazz.

== Early life ==
Rusowsky was born into a Belarusian family; his mother was a member of a Belarusian folk group. He has a classical music background, with knowledge of solfège, and plays instruments such as the guitar and piano. He began his musical training at the age of four at the music school run by his mother. Later, he studied piano at a professional conservatory. The pseudonym "Rusowsky" comes from combining his nickname "Rus" and "Wazowski," the name of a protagonist in the Monsters, Inc. franchise.

== Musical career ==
=== 2019–2024: Beginnings ===
In 2019, Rusowsky began independently releasing his first tracks on digital platforms. From the beginning, he has stated that his music is closely linked to the different stages of life he goes through, addressing themes such as love, heartbreak, loneliness, and introspection. Among his main musical influences, he has cited Tyler, the Creator.

In 2020, Rusowsky released the singles "So So" and "Mwah :3". The former was inspired by the song "Sin Ingresos" by Spanish artist Soto Asa, while "Mwah :3" was later performed in a Gallery Session format. Also, following the COVID-19 pandemic, C. Tangana contacted Rusowsky to produce the track "Bien:(".

Between 2021 and 2022, Rusowsky continued collaborating with other emerging and established artists, such as Najwa on "Esta tarde vi llover" and L'haine on "Lilo". During this period, he also collaborated with musicians such as Ralphie Choo, Mori, Tristán, Drummie, Barry B, Gara Durán, Latin Mafia, Dinamarca, and Hnos Muñoz. In 2022, he collaborated with Aitana on one of the remixes of "Formentera".

In 2023, Rusowsky released the single "Loto," a song that explores heartbreak, melancholy, and sadness, incorporating influences from Mexican music.

=== 2025–present: Daisy ===
On 30 January 2025, Rusowsky released "Sophia," the first single from his debut album. On 13 March, he released the second single "Altagama". In April, he released the third single "Bby Romeo", a collaboration with Ralphie Choo.

On 23 May 2025, Rusowsky released his debut studio album, Daisy, a 13-song work featuring collaborations with artists such as Jean Dawson, Las Ketchup, Ralphie Choo, Ravyn Lenae, Kevin Abstract, and La Zowi. The album, described as a concept album blending electronic pop, alternative reggaeton, and digital melancholy, has been well-received by critics, solidifying his distinctive style within the contemporary Spanish music scene.

Later that July, Rusowsky performed at one of the Tiny Desk Concerts sessions. In the set, he presented new versions of "Johnny Glamour," "(Ecco)," and "Malibu," as well as "Sophia" and "Dolores." On 25 September, the Daisy Tour began at the Movistar Arena in Madrid.

== Discography ==
=== Studio albums ===
List of studio albums, with selected details
Title	Details	Peak chart positions	Certifications
Title	Details	ESP	Certifications
Daisy	Released: 23 May 2025; Label: Warner Music Group; Formats: LP, digital download, streaming	1	PROMUSICAE: Platinum

=== Singles ===
==== As lead artist ====
Year	Title	Peak chart positions	Certifications	Album or EP
Year	Title	ESP	Certifications	Album or EP
"Disorder Waves"	2019	—		Non-album singles
"No sé"	2019	—		Non-album singles
"So so"	2019	—		Non-album singles
"Olas" (with Mori)	2019	—		Non-album singles
"A/b"	2020	—		Non-album singles
"Micro"	2020	—		Non-album singles
"+1 -"	2020	—		Non-album singles
"No t dejas ver"	2020	—		Non-album singles
"Dolores" (with Ralphie Choo)	2020	—		Non-album singles
"+ Suave"	2021	—		Non-album singles
"B.I.L.L"	2021	—		Non-album singles
"Pikito"	2022	—		Non-album singles
"Mwah :3" (with Dinamarca)	2022	—		Non-album singles
"Bla bla bla" (with Drummie and Barry B)	2022	—		Non-album singles
"Q bonito"	2022	—		Non-album singles
"Goofy" (with Tristán!)	2022	—		Non-album singles
"Loto"	2023	—		Non-album singles
"Electric bby" (with Dellafuente)	2023	—		Non-album singles
"Neo roneo" (with Latin Mafia)	2023	—		Non-album singles
"Uwu ^^" (with Bb Trickz)	2023	—		Non-album singles
"Sophia"	2025	—		Daisy
"Altagama"	2025	—	PROMUSICAE: Gold	Daisy
"Bby Romeo" (with Ralphie Choo)	2025	—		Daisy
"Malibu"	2025	6	PROMUSICAE: 3x Platinum	Daisy

==== As featured artist ====
Year	Title	Peak chart positions	Album or EP
Year	Title	ESP	Album or EP
"Hugo Gloss" (with D3llano and Ralphie Choo)	2020	—	Non-album singles
"Liit" (with Çantamarta)	2022	—	Non-album singles
"Valentino" (with Ralphie Choo, Pedraxe, Mori and Clutchill)	2022	—	Non-album singles
"Gata" (with Ralphie Choo)	2023	—	Supernova
"Cell" (with Tristán!)	2024	—	Music

== Awards and nominations ==
Year	Awards	Category	Work	Result	Ref.
2025	Premios GQ Men of the Year	Breakthrough Artist	Himself	Won	
2025	Latin Grammy Awards	Best Alternative Music Album	Daisy	Nominated	
