= Los 40 Music Awards 2025 =

Spanish music awards ceremony

LOS40 Music Awards Santander 2025
- Date: 7 November 2025
- Location: Roig Arena, Valencia
- Presented by: Los 40
- Hosted by: Cristina Boscá; Dani Moreno "El Gallo"; Tony Aguilar

Highlights
- Most wins: Ed Sheeran (3)
- Most nominations: Aitana, Lola Indigo, Dani Fernández and Feid (6 each)
- Website: los40.com/tag/los40_music_awards/a/

Television/radio coverage
- Network: Divinity; Mediaset Infinity; Los 40; YouTube

The 20th Los 40 Music Awards, also named Los 40 Music Awards Santander 2025 for sponsorship reasons, took place on 7 November 2025, at Roig Arena in Valencia, to recognize the best in Spanish and international music of 2025. It was the first time the ceremony takes place in said venue and city.

The nominations were announced on 16 October 2025 via Los 40 YouTube channel and app. In the Spanish music categories, Aitana, Lola Indigo and Dani Fernández, all led with six nominations. In the Global Latin categories, Colombian singer Feid also received six nominations. Finally, in the International categories, British singers Ed Sheeran and Myles Smith were the most nominated, with three nods each.

== Performers ==
Artist(s)	Song(s)
Rosalía	"Reliquia"
Beéle	"No Tiene Sentido" "Mi Refe" "Si Te Pillara"
Nil Moliner	"Al Meu País" "Libertad" "Tu Cuerpo en Braille"
Ed Sheeran; Aitana	"Perfect" "Azizam" "Sapphire"
Morat	"Me Toca a Mí" "Porfa No Te Vayas" "Besos en Guerra"
Dani Martín	"Veinticinco" "Zapatillas"
Nicky Jam; Beéle	"El Perdón" "Hiekka"
Feid	"Monstruo" "Se Lo Juro Mor" "Luna"
Emilia	"Blackout" "Pasarella"
Alleh & Yorghaki	"Capaz (Merengueton)"
Dani Fernández; Valeria Castro	"Y Si Lo Hacemos" "Me Has Invitado a Bailar"
Mora; De La Rose	"Aurora" "Detrás de Tu Alma"
Myles Smith	"Stargazing" "Stay (If You Wanna Dance)" "Nice to Meet You"
Kapo; Danny Ocean	"X Ti" "Imagínate"
Pablo Alborán	"Mis 36" "Vámonos de Aquí"
Rels B	"Tú Vas Sin (Fav)" "A Mí"
Aitana	"Cuando Hables con Él" "6 de Febrero" "Superestrella"
Luck Ra	"La Morocha"

== Winners and nominees ==
The nominees were revealed on 16 October 2025. Winners are listed first and highlighted in bold.

**Spain**
Best Act	Best New Act
**Aitana**; Dani Fernández; Abraham Mateo; Dani Martín; Pablo Alborán; Leiva	**Naiara**; Chiara Oliver; Lia Kali; Lucho RK; Enol; Mayo
Best Album	Best Song
**La Jauría – Dani Fernández**; El Último Día de Nuestras Vidas – Dani Martín; Buenas Noches – Quevedo; Cuarto Azul – Aitana; Nave Dragón – Lola Índigo; AfroLova 25' – Rels B	**"El Último Día de Nuestras Vidas" – Dani Martín**; "Me Has Invitado a Bailar" – Dani Fernández; "Te Confieso" – Depol; "Sin Autotune" – Lola Índigo; "Nexo 04. Tu Cuerpo en Braille" – Nil Moliner
Best Collaboration	Best Music Video
**"Y Si Lo Hacemos" – Dani Fernández & Valeria Castro**; "Gran Vía" – Quevedo & Aitana; "Rayo de Luz" – Soge Culebra & Abraham Mateo; "La Reina" (Remix) – Lola Índigo featuring María Becerra & Villano Antillano; "Sentimiento Natural" – Aitana & Myke Towers; "Bésame" – Alejandro Sanz & Shakira	**"Haz lo Que Quieras Conmigo" – Walls**; "Bailar y Llorar" – Vicco; "Golpo x Despecho" – Lérica, Clara & Abraham Mateo; "Da Me" – Bad Gyal; "Mojaita" – Lola Índigo; "Vámonos de Aquí" – Pablo Alborán & Indiara Sfair
Best Urban Act	Best Live Act
**Rels B**; Omar Montes; Bad Gyal; Quevedo; Saiko; Rusowsky	**Dani Martín**; Depol; Dani Fernández; Álvaro de Luna; Lola Índigo; Nil Moliner
Best Festival or Event	Best Tour or Concert
**Love the Twenties**; Bresh; PortAmérica; Coca-Cola Music Experience; Concert Music Festival; Gira OT 2023	**Metamorfosis Season – Aitana**; La Niña, la Bruja y el Dragón – Lola Índigo; A New Star World Tour – Rels B; El Gran Bellodrama – Ana Mena; La Jauría Tour – Dani Fernández; Buenas Noches Tour – Quevedo
Best LOS40 Summer Live Act	Best Del 40 al 1 Act
**Bombai**; Malva; La Beba; Chema Rivas; Paula Koops; Naiara	**Nil Moliner**; Walls; Beret; Vicco; Ruslana; Adexe y Nau
**International**
Best Act	Best New Act
**Ed Sheeran**; Gracie Abrams; Sabrina Carpenter; Coldplay; Miley Cyrus; Lady Gaga	**Huntrix**; Myles Smith; Alex Warren; Lola Young; Rosé; Sombr
Best Album	Best Song
**Play – Ed Sheeran**; Mayhem – Lady Gaga; Hurry Up Tomorrow – The Weeknd; A Minute... – Myles Smith; Moon Music – Coldplay; Funny Little Fears – Damiano David	**"Stargazing" – Myles Smith**; "Azizam" – Ed Sheeran; "The Door" – Teddy Swims; "That's So True" – Gracie Abrams; "Ordinary" – Alex Warren; "Born with a Broken Heart" – Damiano David
**Global Latin**
Best Act	Best New Act
**Emilia**; Camilo; Sebastián Yatra; Shakira; Morat; Beéle	**De La Rose**; Omar Courtz; Alleh & Yorghaki; Pikete; Ca7riel & Paco Amoroso; Luck Ra
Best Song	Best Urban Song
**"Capaz (Merenguetón)" – Alleh & Yorghaki**; "Sin Ti" – Morat & Jay Wheeler; "Droga" – Mora & C. Tangana; "Hasta Que Me Enamoro" – María Becerra & Tini; "Soltera" – Shakira; "La Morocha" – Luck Ra & BM	**"Blackout" – Emilia, Tini & Nicki Nicole**; "Mi Refe" – Beéle & Ovy on the Drums; "Comernos" – Omar Courtz & Bad Gyal; "Soleao" – Myke Towers & Quevedo; "Nuevayol" – Bad Bunny; "Detrás de Tu Alma" – Mora
Best Album	Best Urban Album
**Borondo – Beéle**; Ya es Mañana – Morat; Babylon Club – Danny Ocean; Milagro – Sebastián Yatra; Perfectas – Emilia; Cosa Nuestra – Rauw Alejandro	**Debí Tirar Más Fotos – Bad Bunny**; Lo Mismo de Siempre – Mora; Por Si Alguien Nos Escucha – Kapo; FERXXO Vol X: Sagrado – Feid; El Último Baile (Deluxe) – Trueno; Tropicoqueta – Karol G
Best Collaboration	Best Urban Collaboration
**"Imagínate" – Danny Ocean & Kapo**; "X Ti" – Kapo & Feid; "Solcito" – Miguel Bueno & Juan Duque; "Me Toca a Mí" – Morat; "Blackout" – Emilia, Tini & Nicki Nicole; "La Plena (W Sound 05)" – W Sound, Beéle & Ovy on the Drums	**"Hiekka" – Nicky Jam & Beéle**; "Veldá" – Bad Bunny, Omar Courtz & Dei V; "Aurora" – Mora & De La Rose; "Verano Rosa" – Karol G & Feid; "QLOO" – Young Cister & Kreamly; "Qué Pasaría..." – Rauw Alejandro & Bad Bunny
Best Urban Act	Best Live Act
**Mora**; Alexis & Fido; Bad Bunny; Karol G; Myke Towers; Feid	**Morat**; Rauw Alejandro; Feid; Trueno; Emilia; Sebastián Yatra
Best Tour or Concert	Best Music Video
**Fastest Tour – Feid**; +Pretty + Dirty World Tour – Maluma; Cosa Nuestra World Tour – Rauw Alejandro; Papota Tour – Ca7riel & Paco Amoroso; 201 Tour – Manuel Turizo; Nuestro Lugar Feliz Tour 2025 – Camilo	**"Carita Linda" – Rauw Alejandro**; "Se Lo Juro Mor" – Feid; "Priti" – Danny Ocean & Sech; "Latina Foreva" – Karol G; "Ramen Para Dos" – María Becerra & Paulo Londra; "La Pelirroja" – Sebastián Yatra
**Golden Icon Award**
**Rosalía**; **Nicky Jam**; **Ed Sheeran**; **Pablo Alborán**
**Argentine Phenomenon Award**	**Colombian Phenomenon Award**
**Luck Ra**	**Feid**
