= 2026 Premios Juventud =

2026 award ceremony

23rd Premios Juventud
- Date: September 3, 2026
- Location: Starlite Auditorium; Marbella, Spain
- Hosted by: Alejandra Espinoza, Clarissa Molina and Jesús Vázquez
- Most awards: Aitana, Alejandro Fernández, Prince Royce, Romeo Santos and Shakira (3 each)
- Most nominations: Carín León (9)
- Website: Official page

Television/radio coverage
- Network: Univisión

The 23rd Premios Juventud were held on September 3, 2026, at the Starlite Auditorium in Marbella, Spain. The ceremony recognized the best in pop culture of young Hispanic and Latino Americans. This was the first time that the ceremony was held in Europe. It was simulcast by Univision, UniMás, Galavisión, and streamed on ViX. Alejandra Espinoza, Clarissa Molina and Jesús Vázquez hosted the ceremony.

== Performers ==
Artist(s)	Song(s)
Pre-show
ROBI	"Brrreak!"
Chuyin	"Pues qué le hago?"
Juan Duque	"Songo Sorongo"
Main show
Farruko, Juan Magán, Rous & Greeicy	"Marbella Nights" / "Yapaque" / "Madrid" / "Como un sueño"
Mau y Ricky	"aiaiaiaiai"
Natanael Cano	"Mar Azul" / "CR7"
Santos Bravos	"Velocidade"
Quevedo, Las Ku4tro & Elvis Crespo	"Columbia" / "Al Golpito" / "La Graciosa"
Ángela Aguilar	"Cielito lindo"
Eladio Carrión	"Polaroid" / "Body"
Camilo	"El Árbol"
Elena Rose & Alleh	"Quién Contra Mi " / "Tututu"
Marc Anthony	"Aguanile" / "Valió La Pena" / "Flor Pálida" / "Vivir Mi Vida"
Aria Vega	"Tototo" / "Cule Poco" / "Chévere"
Manuel Carrasco	"Buchito" / "Oh Si Pudiera"
Kenia Os & Xavi	"Malas Mañas"
Wisin & Kapo	"Saoco" / "Paleta" / "Gistro Amarillo" / "Muévelo pa mi"
Christian Nodal	"Amé"
La Oreja de Van Gogh	"Rosas"
Ana Mena	"Madrid City" / "pa ti toa"
Morat	"Tu Cárcel" / "Besos en guerra"
Yandel	"DND" / "Cuál Es La Necesidad"
Silvestre Dangond & Elena Rose	"Cásate Conmigo" / "Efectos Secundarios"
Elvis Crespo	"Pa' Bailar"
DnD | Do Not Disturb	"Too Good"
Fariana & Kiko el Crazy	"Me Muevo"
Alofoke Music, Arlene MC & Jey One	"Saca Punta"

== Winners and nominees ==
The nominees were announced on July 28, 2026. Carín León leads with nine nominations. He is followed by Beéle, Kany García and Rauw Alejandro with seven each, and Eladio Carrión, Farruko, Karol G, Manuel Turizo, Ovy on the Drums, Quevedo, Romeo Santos, Shakira and Xavi with six nominations each. Aitana, Alejandro Fernández, Prince Royce, Romeo Santos and Shakira were the most awarded artists, with three wins each, while Angelique Boyer, Bad Bunny, Beéle, Bizarrap, Carín León, Grupo Frontera, Karol G, Ovy on the Drums and Santos Bravos followed with two wins each.

Winners are listed first and highlighted in bold.

=== Music ===
**Premios Juventud Female Artist**: **Shakira**; Aitana; Ana Mena; Anitta; Elena Rose; Kany García; Karol G; Natti Natasha; Rosalía; Young Miko	**Premios Juventud Male Artist**: **Bad Bunny**; Carín León; Danny Ocean; Farruko; Maluma; Myke Towers; Quevedo; Rauw Alejandro; Romeo Santos; Xavi
**Favorite Group or Duo of the Year**: **Santos Bravos**; Dnd I Do Not Disturb; Gente de Zona; Jowell & Randy; La Oreja de Van Gogh; Maná; Mau y Ricky; Morat; Rawayana; Reik	**New Generation – Female Artist**: **Aria Vega**; Amaia; Angela Leiva; Annasofia; Emjay; Isadora; Judeline; Mafalda Cardenal; Mar Solís; Nic
**New Generation – Male Artist**: **Santos Bravos**; Bebeshito; Clarent; Damn Goldo; Dfzm; Dia; Juan Duque; Kris R.; Maisak; Sebas Barcenas	**New Generation – Mexican Music**: **Omar Camacho**; Armenta; Chuyin; Edgardo Nuñez; Kakalo; Kane Rodriguez; La Nueva Ola De La Cumbia; Low Clika; Mariangela; Tombochio
**My Favorite Track**: **"Me Está Doliendo" – Carín León and Alejandro Fernández**; "Carita Linda" – Rauw Alejandro; "Coleccionando Heridas" – Karol G and Marco Antonio Solís; "Corazón" – Danny Ocean; "La Perla" – Rosalía and Yahritza y su Esencia	**Album of the Year**: **Tropicoqueta – Karol G**; ¿Dónde es el after? – Rawayana; Babylon Club – Danny Ocean; Better Late Than Never – Romeo Santos and Prince Royce; Equilibrivm – Anitta; Lamento en Baile – Daddy Yankee; Lux – Rosalía; Palabra De To’s (Seca) – Carín León; Sinfónico (En Vivo) – Yandel; Stendhal – Ozuna and Beéle
**Best Euro-Song**: **"Superestrella" – Aitana**; "Com Você" – Judeline and Amaia; "Da Me" – Bad Gyal; "La Graciosa" – Quevedo and Elvis Crespo; "Lárgate" – Ana Mena; "Moja1ta" – Lola Indigo; "No Me Tires Flores" – Alejandro Sanz and Rels B; "Oh Si Pudiera" – Manuel Carrasco; "Si Juegas Conmigo (Asa25)" – Juan Magán and Abraham Mateo; "Todos Estamos Bailando La Misma Canción" – La Oreja de Van Gogh	**Girl Power**: **"Fifty Fifty" – Kenia Os and Lola Indigo**; "Amiga Mía" – Karol G and Greeicy; "Brujería (En Vivo Desde La Plaza De Toros La México)" – Yuridia and Majo Aguilar; "Choka Choka" – Anitta and Shakira; "Gabriela (Young Miko Remix)" – Katseye and Young Miko; "Huir" – Kany García and Lia Kali; "La Rumba del Perdón" – Rosalía, Estrella Morente and Sílvia Pérez Cruz; "Muñeca" – Bad Gyal and De La Rose; "Muxaxa" – Tokischa and La Mas Doll; "Te Apuesto" – Ha**Ash and María José
**OMG Collaboration**: **"Dai Dai" – Shakira and Burna Boy**; "Birthday Behavior" – Bia and Young Miko; "Damn I Love Miami" – Pitbull and Lil Jon; "East La" – Will.i.am and Taboo; "Estrellitas y Duendes" – Juan Luis Guerra 4.40 and Sting; "Oye Mi Amor (Live from Mexico)" – Dua Lipa, Maná and Fher de Maná; "Thootie" – Ice Spice and Tokischa; "We Made It Look Easy / Hicimos Que Pareciera Fácil" – Bon Jovi and Carín León	**The Perfect Collab**: **"No Quiero Hablar" – Ángela Aguilar and Marc Anthony**; "A Medio Vivir" – Ricky Martin and Carín León; "Carteras Chinas" – Elena Rose, Camilo and Los Ángeles Azules; "La Del Primer Puesto" – Reik and Xavi; "La Del Proceso" – Grupo Frontera and Manuel Turizo; "Una Noche Contigo" – La Arrolladora Banda El Limón de René Camacho and Juanes
**Best Dance Track**: **"Yapaque" – Farruko, Greeicy and Steve Aoki**; "Algo Tú" – Shakira and Beéle; "Bai-Lala" – Abraham Mateo; "Dando Vueltas" – Rauw Alejandro; "Esa Diva" – Melody; "Motinha 2.0 (Mete Marcha) Remix" – Dennis, Luísa Sonza and Emilia; "No Bailes Sola (Nsm25)" – Juan Magán and Lucho Rk; "Polaroid" – Eladio Carrión; "Secreto (Remix)" – Payaso X Ley, Nyno Vargas, Omar Montes and Ernesto Losa; "Sorry Papi" – Topic and Becky G	**Afrobeat of the Year**: **"Enemigos" – Ozuna, Beéle and Ovy on the Drums**; "Bendito" – Rawayana; "Botecito" – Juan Duque & Hamilton; "Chévere (Premium_remix)" – Aria Vega and Ryan Castro; "La Villa" – Ryan Castro, Kapo and Gangsta
**Best Cumbia Song**: **"Con Otra" – Cazzu**; "Celosa" – Ke Personajes and J Balvin; "Cuando Una Mujer" – Mariangela; "Cumbiando" – La Nueva Ola de Cumbia & La Coreañera; "Prieta De Mi Vida" – Los Mirlos and Guaynaa; "Yo Me Lo Busqué" – Los Ángeles Azules and Thalía	**Producer of the Year**: **Bizarrap**; Andy Clay; Casta; Édgar Barrera; Fux Beat; La Paciencia; Mag; Nico Cotton; Ovy on the Drums; Sky Rompiendo
**Best Tour**: **Debí Tirar Más Fotos World Tour – Bad Bunny**; Bailemos Otra Vez Tour – Chayanne; Cosa Nuestra World Tour – Rauw Alejandro; De Sonora, Para El Mundo – Carín León; Dinastía Tour – Peso Pluma; Las Mujeres Ya No Lloran World Tour – Shakira; Latinaje Tour – Cazzu; Lux Tour – Rosalía; Mejor Tarde Que Nunca Tour – Romeo Santos and Prince Royce; Vivir Sin Aire Tour – Maná	**Best Urban Track**: **"Daddy Yankee: Bzrp Music Sessions, Vol. 0/66" – Bizarrap and Daddy Yankee**; "Al Golpito" – Quevedo and Nueva Línea; "Alambre Púa" – Bad Bunny; "Amista" – Blessd and Ovy on the Drums; "Aplicándola" – Farruko; "Buenos Términos" – Rauw Alejandro; "Lleva Al Sol" – Rels B; "Polaroid" – Eladio Carrión; "Se Lo Juro Mor" – Feid; "Una Aventura" – Ozuna
**Best Urban Mix**: **"Tonto" – J Balvin, Ryan Castro and DJ Snake**; "5 Estrellas – W Sound 23" – W Sound, Myke Towers and Ovy on the Drums; "Ay Dale" – Farruko and Eddy Lover; "Cholo 2" – Victor Mendivil and Eladio Carrión; "Forni" – Los Ballers, Clarent and Rauw Alejandro; "Incorregible" – Jory Boy and Chencho Corleone; "Me Voy A La Chingada" – Yandel and Xavi; "Portate Bonito" – Anuel AA, Blessd and Ovy on the Drums; "Ta' Bien" – Nicky Jam and Beéle; "Un Polvito +" – Maluma and Maisak	**Best Urban Rhythmic Song**: **"Verano Rosa" – Karol G and Feid**; "Apaga La Luz" – Røz and Peso Pluma; "Buenos Días" – Eladio Carrión; "No Tiene Sentido" – Beéle; "Perlas Negras" – Natanael Cano and Gabito Ballesteros; "Pongo" – Rvssian, Rauw Alejandro and Wizkid; "Si Estás Con Alguien" – Omar Courtz; "Si Te Vas" – J Balvin and Jay Wheeler; "Tengo Celos" – Myke Towers; "Zaza" – Alofoke Music, Shadow Blow and Don Miguelo
**Best Urban Trap Song**: **"Que Sensación (Remix)" – Jezzy and Arcángel**; "Bienvenida" – Clarent; "Breezy" – Kidd Keo & Neutro Shorty; "Buti Call" – Kendo Kaponi and Omar Courtz; "Chica Atractiva" – Floyymenor and Lewis Somes; "Gout" – La Pantera; "Ricky Boby" – Eladio Carrión; "Topshelf" – Kris R. and Myke Towers; "Yeh!" – J Noa; "Yogurcito Remix" – Blessd, Anuel AA, Yan Block, Luar la L, Kris R. and Roa	**Best Dembow Song**: **"Saca Punta" – Arlene MC, Alofoke Music, Jey One and La Mas Doll**; "Dem Bow" – Natti Natasha, Nando Boom and Dímelo Flow; "Hace Calor" – Maria Becerra, El Alfa and Xross; "Me Muevo" – Fariana and Kiko El Crazy; "Miami" – Tokischa; "Pa Que Lo Bailes (Bailalo Rocky)" – Lomiiel; "Pelo" – DJ Pereira and Blue Diamond; "Un Gatito Me Llamó" – Karol G
**Best Urban Album**: **Do Not Disturb – Young Miko**; Afrolova 25' – Rels B; Corsa – Eladio Carrión; El Baifo – Quevedo; El Sobreviviente WWW – Wisin; Hopi Sendé – Ryan Castro; Island Boyz – Myke Towers; La 8va Maravilla – Arcángel; Manda La Plena Moh – Farruko; Stendhal – Ozuna and Beéle	**Best Pop/Urban Song**: **"Bronceador" – Maluma**; "Babylon" – Venesti and Nicky Jam; "Canción Para Regresar" – Sebastián Yatra, Lucho Rk, Belinda and Gente de Zona; "Cosita Linda" – Elena Rose and Justin Quiles; "Menos El Cora" – Ryan Castro and Manuel Turizo; "Paris" – Boza and Sech
**Best Pop/Rhythmic Song**: **"Yo Y Tú" – Ovy on the Drums, Quevedo and Beéle**; "Cambiaré" – Luis Fonsi and Feid; "Chamita" – Mari La Carajita; "Inglés En Miami" – Rawayana and Manuel Turizo; "Las Guapas" – Alejandro Sanz; "Pinterest (Spanish)" – Anitta; "Tututu" – Elena Rose and Alleh	**Best Pop Song**: **"Bésame" – Alejandro Sanz and Shakira**; "Bebiendo Lágrimas" – Mar Solís; "La Del Primer Puesto" – Reik and Xavi; "La Pelirroja" – Sebastián Yatra; "Mal Escrito" – Carlos Rivera and Malú; "Mi Historia Entre Tus Dedos" – Matteo Bocelli and Gianluca Grignani; "Si Tuviera Que Elegir" – Ricardo Montaner, Camilo and Evaluna Montaner; "Te Acuerdas?" – Dnd I Do Not Disturb and R!Ch Yashel; "Tierra Mía" – Kany García; "Un Abrazo" – Gloria Trevi
**Best Pop/Rock Song**: **"Sin Ti" – Morat and Jay Wheeler**; "¿Es En Serio?" – Ela Taubert; "Muérdeme" – Juanes and Bomba Estéreo; "Vivir Sin Aire" – Maná and Carín León; "Vuelve" – Black Guayaba	**Best Pop Song – New Generation**: **"Morfina" – Humbe**; "Com Você" – Judeline and Amaia; "Hecho Para Ti" – Latin Mafia and Omar Apollo; "Nunca Me Lo Esperé" – Piso 21 and Lasso; "Tus Iniciales" – Lola Indigo, Lia Kali, Queralt Lahoz and Salma
**Best Pop/Ballad Song**: **"Sin Despedida" – Carlos Rivera and Alejandro Fernández**; "+ Te Vale" – Yami Safdie and Emilia; "Aquí En La Arena" – Reik and Leo Rizzi; "Conmigo Sin Ti" – Matisse and Cristian Castro; "Huir" – Kany García and Lia Kali; "KMO" – Pablo Alborán	**Best Pop Album**: **Cuarto Azul – Aitana**; ¿Qué Significa El Amor? – Carlos Rivera; ¿Y Ahora Qué +? – Alejandro Sanz; Apambichao – Manuel Turizo; Bendito Verano – Elena Rose; Juanesteban – Juanes; KMO – Pablo Alborán; La Llave – Mau Y Ricky; Puerta Abierta – Kany García; TQ+ – Reik
**Best Mexican Music Collaboration**: **"Modo Difícil" – Grupo Firme and Grupo Frontera**; "Donde Estés, Donde Estoy" – Carlos Rivera and Marisela; "Los Laureles" – Pepe Aguilar, Josi Cuen and Jorge Medina; "No Voy A Cambiar" – Codiciado and Xavi; "Te Quiero, Te Amo" – Pesado and Alfredo Olivas	**Best Mexican Music Fusion**: **"No Capea" – Xavi and Grupo Frontera**; "Déjame Dormir" – Codiciado and Carín León; "Demencia" – Junior H and Gael Valenzuela; "Dopamina" – Peso Pluma and Tito Double P; "Marlboro Rojo" – Fuerza Regida; "Mejores Jordans 2" – Victor Mendivil and Oscar Maydon; "Ojitos Mentirosos" – Chino Pacas; "Perlas Negras" – Natanael Cano and Gabito Ballesteros; "Pues Qué Le Hago?" – Chuyin; "Tu Tu Tu" – Clave Especial and Edgardo Nuñez
**Best Mexican Mariachi Music**: **"Retumbando En El Cora" – Camila Fernández**; "Amémonos De Nuevo" – Lupita Infante and Leonardo Aguilar; "China De Los Ojos Negros" – Ángela Aguilar; "Cuento De Nunca Acabar" – Carlos Rivera and Ana Bárbara; "¿Quien No Ha Llorado Por Amor?" – Alex Fernández; "Tú Y Las Nubes" – Pepe Aguilar and Alfredo Olivas; "Un Vals" – Christian Nodal	**Best Mexican Banda Music**: **"El Rey" – Vicente Fernández and Alejandro Fernández**; "Al Chile No Sé" – Banda Los Sebastianes De Saúl Plata and Gerardo Coronel; "Aunque Tiren Hate" – La Arrolladora Banda El Limón De René Camacho; "De Esta Me Levanto" – Banda Los Recoditos; "Directo Al Corazón" – Luis Angel "El Flaco"; "No Me Aprovechaste" – Banda El Recodo De Cruz Lizárraga; "Seguro Le Dolió" – Banda Ms De Sergio Lizárraga and Fuerza Regida
**Best Mexican Norteño Music**: **"Me Enamoré Solo" – Calibre 50**; "Eres" – Joss Favela and Alfredo Olivas; "Lejos Estamos Mejor" – Eden Muñoz; "Selfie" – La Fiera De Ojinaga; "Supercargada" – Los Dos De Tamaulipas; "Ya Me Vale Madre" – El Fantasma	**Best Mexican Music Album**: **Palabra De To’s (Seca) – Carín León**; ¿Quien + Como Yo? – Christian Nodal; 111xpantia (Deluxe) – Fuerza Regida; Arriba La Compañia – Los Dos De Tamaulipas; Dinastía – Peso Pluma and Tito Double P; El Mundo Es Del Que Se Anima – Calibre 50; Lo Que Me Falta Por Llorar – Grupo Frontera; La Fernández – Camila Fernández; Nadie Se Va Como Llegó – Ángela Aguilar; Silencio Habla – Oscar Ortiz
**Tropical Hit**: **"Dardos" – Romeo Santos and Prince Royce**; "1+1" – Maluma and Kany García; "Como En El Idilio" – Marc Anthony and Nathy Peluso; "Cómo Se Compara" – Luis Figueroa; "El Pacto" – Silvestre Dangond and Manuel Turizo; "Hello, What’s Up" – Christian Alicea; "La Graciosa" – Quevedo and Elvis Crespo; "La Tierra Del Olvido (Versión Salsa)" – Carlos Vives and Grupo Niche; "No Te Borro" – Fariana; "Tú Tienes Algo" – Indy Fontaine and Charlie Cruz	**Tropical Mix**: **"Lokita Por Mí" – Romeo Santos and Prince Royce**; "A Celia" – Lena Burke featuring La India, Gilberto Santa Rosa, José Alberto "El Canario", Gonzalo Rubalcaba, Cucco Peña and Víctor Manuelle; "Amor Bonito" – Kany García and Juan Luis Guerra 4.40; "Apambichao" – Manuel Turizo and Maluma; "Fabricando Fantasías" – Sergio George and Carlos Vives; "Hasta El Sol De Hoy" – Guaynaa and Farruko; "Malportada" – Nathy Peluso and Rawayana; "Me Muevo" – Fariana and Kiko El Crazy; "Que Me Quiera Má" – Marc Anthony and Wisin; "Una Vaina Bien" – Silvestre Dangond and Sebastián Yatra
**Best Tropical Album**: **Better Late Than Never – Romeo Santos and Prince Royce**; El Último Baile – Silvestre Dangond and Juancho De La Espriella; El Último Disco Vol.1 – Carlos Vives; Gris – Luis Figueroa; La Covertura – Guaynaa; Música Para Bailar – Fariana; Poeta Herío – Elvis Crespo; Radio Venezuela – Chino Y Nacho, Chyno Miranda and Nacho; Soy – Daniela Darcourt; Swingkete Vol.1 – Maratón – Christian Alicea

=== TV and streaming ===
**My Favorite Actor**: **Gabriel Soto – Monteverde**; Andrés Palacios – Mi verdad oculta; Diego Klein – Guardián de mi vida; Emmanuel Palomares – Los hilos del pasado; Marcus Ornellas – Doménica Montero	**My Favorite Actress**: **Angelique Boyer – Doménica Montero**; Oka Giner – Tan cerca de ti, nace el amor; Silvia Navarro – Guardián de mi vida; Susana González – Mi verdad oculta; Yadhira Carrillo – Los hilos del pasado
**They Make Me Fall in Love**: **Angelique Boyer and Marcus Ornellas – Doménica Montero**; África Zavala and Gabriel Soto – Monteverde; Ela Velden and Sebastián Rulli – Mi rival; Oka Giner and David Zepeda – Tan cerca de ti, nace el amor; Silvia Navarro and Daniel Arenas – Guardián de mi vida; Susana González and David Chocarro – Mi verdad oculta

=== Digital/Social ===
**Creator of the Year**: **Stefanny Loaiza**; Diego Rodriguez; Ibai Llanos; Rocío López; Tefi Valenzuela	**Best LOL**: **Jenny Solares**; Andrea Farga; Héctor De La Garza; Nachter; Tío Néstor
**Podcast of the Year**: **Pinky Promise**; El Chal Con Pao Sasso; La Cotorrisa; Roca Project; Yo Pude, Tu Puedes	**#GettingReadyWith**: **Valeria Villalobos**; Alejandra Capetillo; Lailany Sota; Ludmilla; Sol Vargas
**Soccer POV**: **Mercedes Roa**; Futbol Al Chile; Ivansfull; Joel Ubieto; Pablo Zolezzi	**#AirplaneMode**: **Araya Vlogs**; Alejandra Travels; Hola Soy Natasha; Plex; Roberta Con Maleta
**Couple Goals**: **Aitana and Plex**; Calle and Poché; Fernanda Giménez and Sebastien Andrade; Lola Lolita and Alonso López; Polo Morín and Bernardo Abascal	**Creator of Spain**: **Lola Lolita**; Elena Gortari; Jordi Rodriguez Moreno; Nil Ojeda; Tatiana Kae
