= 2026 Heat Latin Music Awards =

2026 award ceremony

2026 HEAT Latin Music Awards
- Date: November 5, 2026
- Venue: Puerto Vallarta International Convention Center
- Country: Mexico
- Hosted by: Karime Pindter; Caroline Aquino; La Segura; Ignacio Baladán; Yohana Vargas; Dímelo King

Highlights
- Most awards: TBA
- Most nominations: Karol G (10)
- Website: losheat.tv

Television/radio coverage
- Network: LosHeat.tv

The 2026 Heat Latin Music Awards will be held at the Puerto Vallarta International Convention Center in Puerto Vallarta, Jalisco, Mexico, on November 5, 2026. The ceremony will be streamed live on LosHeat.tv. The 2026 edition will mark the first time the Heat Latin Music Awards are held in Mexico, in collaboration with the government of Jalisco and the municipality of Puerto Vallarta.

Karol G is the most nominated artist, with ten nominations. Bad Bunny follows with nine, while Carlos Rivera and Shakira received seven nominations each. The ceremony will take place during HEAT Week, which is scheduled for October 31 through November 5.

== Nominations ==
The nominees for the 2026 HEAT Latin Music Awards were announced on September 24, 2026. The complete list of nominees was published by Billboard.

Best Male Artist	Best Female Artist
Bad Bunny; Feid; Carín León; Alejandro Fernández; Carlos Rivera; Maluma; J Balvin; Manuel Turizo; Wisin; Alejandro Sanz; Quevedo; Rels B; Danny Ocean; Ricardo Montaner	Karol G; Shakira; Elena Rose; Rosalía; Tini; Emilia; Anitta; Kenia Os; Aitana; Kany García; Greeicy; Mon Laferte; Cazzu; Yuridia; Belinda; Ana Mena; Gloria Trevi; Thalía
Best Group or Band	Best Rock Artist
Morat; Grupo Frontera; Grupo Firme; Ha*Ash; Maná; Fuerza Regida; Rawayana; CA7RIEL & Paco Amoroso; Los Ángeles Azules; Banda MS; Latin Mafia; La Arrolladora Banda El Limón De René Camacho; Ke Personajes; Intocable; Grupo Niche; Santos Bravos; Cultura Profética; Los Tucanes de Tijuana	Maná; Molotov; Don Tetto; Arde Bogotá; Airbag; Aterciopelados; Zoé; No Te Va Gustar; Siddhartha; Enjambre; Panteón Rococó; The Warning; Babasónicos; Tan Biónica; Enrique Bunbury; Viniloversus; Conociendo Rusia
Best Pop Artist	Best Urban Artist
Camilo; Danny Ocean; Shakira; Alejandro Sanz; Carlos Rivera; Morat; Reik; Aitana; Luis Fonsi; Ha*Ash; Kenia Os; Rosalía; Yuridia; Matisse; Tini; Belinda; Mon Laferte; Gloria Trevi; María José; Sin Bandera	Beéle; Ryan Castro; Kapo; Bad Bunny; Rauw Alejandro; Karol G; J Balvin; Feid; Arcángel; Wisin; Farruko; Maluma; Young Miko; Rels B; Quevedo; El Malilla; Trueno; Bad Gyal; Duki
Best Tropical Artist	Best Salsa Artist
Carlos Vives; Prince Royce; Romeo Santos; Eddy Herrera; Elvis Crespo; Silvestre Dangond; Fonseca; Grupo 5; Corazón Serrano; Olga Tañón; Los Ángeles Azules; La Sonora Santanera; Ke Personajes; Miriam Cruz; Margarita la Diosa de la Cumbia; Chino & Nacho; Américo; El Blachy	Grupo Niche; Víctor Manuelle; Yiyo Sarante; Willy García; Luis Enrique; Gilberto Santa Rosa; Brunella Torpoco; Marc Anthony; Rubén Blades; Christian Alicea; Jerry Rivera; Grupo Cañaveral; Oscar D'León; Guayacán Orquesta; Luis Figueroa; Tito Nieves
Best Southern Region Artist	Best Andean Region Artist
Emilia; Tiago PZK; Trueno; Luck Ra; Gonzalo Genek; Mon Laferte; Tini; María Becerra; Cris Mj; Anitta; Marama; Duki; CA7RIEL & Paco Amoroso; Milo J; Cazzu; Pablo Vita; Kidd Voodoo	Greeicy; Mau y Ricky; Jombriel; ALLEH; Dayanara; Andreina Bravo; Nanpa Básico; Lasso; Los Amigos Invisibles; Miguel Bueno; Joaquina; LA GURU; Mike Bahía; Juliana; Luister La Voz; Juan Duque; FARIANA
Best Northern Region Artist	Best New Artist
De La Rose; Michael Flores; Tito Double P; Majo Aguilar; Natanael Cano; Alfredo Olivas; Boza; Netón Vega; Oscar Maydon; Gabito Ballesteros; Remmy Valenzuela; Sech; Gente De Zona; Dei V; ROA; Lucía De la Puerta; Guitarricadelafuente; Alemán; Gera MX	Clarent; Paloma Morphy; DFZM; Macario Martínez; Santostefi Bravos; Ivan Cornejo; Netón Vega; LATIN MAFIA; El Bogueto; Kris R; Melody; Mar Solís; Dayanara; Omar Courtz; Miguel Bueno; Anna Sofia; Dani Flow; Lara Campos; Yeri Mua
Musical Promise	Influencer of the Year
Aria Vega; Kate Candela; Gonzy; Mario Girón; Marc Magán; Lowis Ye; Motherflowers; Kevis & Maykyy; Marcos Villalobos; Ana Sofi W; Jhon de la Torre; Lucero Mijares; Camila Fernández; Judeline; Cachirula; Vivir Quintana; Isadora; Yele; Lala García; Plan de Escape; Dani Barranco; Yo soy Arango	Alejo Igoa; Aldo Arturo; Ignacia Antonia; Araya Vlogs; Lucas Rangel; Davoo Xeneize; Tefi Valenzuela; Pamela López; Zully; Shirley Arica; Camilo Cifuentes; Aaron Mercury; Wendy Guevara; Nicola Porcella; Fede Vigevani; Paola Villalobos; Karime Pindter; Luisito Comunica; Yohana Vargas; Ignacio Baladan; La Segura; Alexis Omman; Berth-OH; Robe Grill; Rivers; LA COBRA; Kim Shantal
Best Regional Popular Artist	Regional Mexican Artist
Jessi Uribe; Paola Jara; Luis Alfonso; Pipe Bueno; Arelys Henao; Francy; Dayanara; Natalia Jiménez	Lucero; Christian Nodal; Grupo Firme; Grupo Frontera; Fuerza Regida; Carín León; Alejandro Fernández; Alfredo Olivas; Alicia Villarreal; Ana Bárbara; Eden Muñoz; Banda MS; La Arrolladora Banda El Limón de René Camacho; Julión Álvarez y su Norteño Banda; Lenin Ramírez; Remmy Valenzuela; Majo Aguilar
Best Dominican Urban Artist	Best Music Video
El Alfa; Tokischa; La Perversa; Yailin La Más Viral; Chimbala; Rochy RD; Bulin 47; Donaty; Kiko el Crazy; La Insuperable; Shadow Blow; Don Miguelo; Arlene MC; Jey One; La Mas Doll; Lil Naay; Ronny GTA	"Berghain" — Rosalía feat. Björk & Yves Tumor; "Rojo Profundo" — Dillom; "Bajo De La Piel" — Milo J; "Choka Choka" — Anitta, Shakira; "Dai Dai" — Shakira, Burna Boy; "La Villa" — Ryan Castro, Kapo, Gangsta; "DtMF" — Bad Bunny; "SUPERESTRELLA" — Aitana; "Sin Despedida" — Carlos Rivera, Alejandro Fernández; "Heterocromía" — Belinda; "NUEVAYoL" — Bad Bunny; "Pa' Él" — Los Ángeles Azules, TINI; "Otro Como Tú" — Cazzu; "Tú y Yo y Tú" — Siddhartha; "Si se acaba el mundo" — Danna, El Malilla; "Papasito" — Karol G; "Dardos" — Romeo Santos, Prince Royce; "Gimme More" — CA7RIEL & Paco Amoroso
Best Collaboration	Best Digital Content Platform
"Te Apuesto" — Ha*Ash & María José; "VeLDÁ" — Bad Bunny ft. Dei V, Omar Courtz; "Cuando No Era Cantante / No Hay Loco Que No Corone" — El Bogueto, Yung Beef; "Me Jalo" — Fuerza Regida, Grupo Frontera; "Vivir Sin Aire" — Maná & Carín León; "Perlas Negras" — Natanael Cano, Gabito Ballesteros; "Para Que Seas Feliz" — Ricardo Montaner, Eden Muñoz; "El Final De Nuestra Historia" — Josi Cuen ft. Jorge Medina; "Fifty Fifty" — Kenia Os, Lola Índigo; "Coleccionando Heridas" — Karol G, Marco Antonio Solís; "A Medio Vivir" — Ricky Martin, Carín León; "Carteras Chinas" — Elena Rose, Camilo & Los Ángeles Azules; "DOLCE VITA" — Danna, Belinda; "BbY WOW" — Karol G, Judeline, Rusowsky; "La Graciosa" — Quevedo ft. Elvis Crespo; "Como en el Idilio" — Marc Anthony, Nathy Peluso; "Con el corazón" — Maluma, Yeison Jiménez; "Pa ti toa" — Ana Mena, Lola Índigo; "Andamos Ready" — Los Tucanes de Tijuana, Maffio, Izaak G; "Así Fue" — Arthur Hanlon & Thalía	Alofoke Media Group; DIMELOKING; La Cotorrisa; El Factor Latino; Impresentables de LOS40; Spotify Sessions; Javier Paniagua ¿Qué es la música?; SongBook; Hermanos de Leche; CREATIVO — Roberto Mtz; Los Hombres Sí Lloran — Juan Pablo Raba; Contenido Extra — Jessie Cervantes; WestCOL; Las Alucines; Pinky Promise con Karla Díaz; Se Regalan Dudas; Karime Kooler; Alan por el Mundo; Leyendas Legendarias; Future of Music
DJ of the Year	Song of the Year
Alok; Vintage Culture; Bizarrap; Deorro; The Martinez Brothers; Julio Victoria; Steve Aoki; Juan Magán; Mariana BO; DJ Adoni; Little D; DJ Tao	"Todo lo fue" — Lenin Ramírez; "La Villa" — Ryan Castro, Kapo, Gangsta; "No Me Sé Rajar" — Alejandro Fernández; "Dai Dai" — Shakira, Burna Boy; "DtMF" — Bad Bunny; "La Perla" — Rosalía ft. Yahritza Y Su Esencia; "SUPERESTRELLA" — Aitana; "Niño" — Milo J; "BbY WOW" — Karol G, Judeline, Rusowsky; "Baile Inolvidable" — Bad Bunny; "La Graciosa" — Quevedo ft. Elvis Crespo; "Coleccionando Heridas" — Karol G y Marco Antonio Solís; "Osadía" — Eden Muñoz, Cristian Castro; "No Capea" — Xavi, Grupo Frontera; "Eres Mi Nada" — Yuridia
Producer of the Year	Video Director of the Year
Tatool; Ovy On The Drums; XROSS; KBeaTz; Sky Rompiendo; Federico Vindver; MAG; Tainy; Edgar Barrera; Sergio George; Rafa Arcaute	Stillz; Residente; Direct Tony; Jessi Terrero; Rodrigo Films; Pedro Artola; Nuno Gomes; Nicolás Méndez; Darío Burbano y Felipe Mejía
Album of the Year	Best Viral Song
DtMF — Bad Bunny; LUX — Rosalía; Tropicoqueta — Karol G; En Las Nubes – Con Mis Panas — Elena Rose; MUDA — Carín León; Free Spirits — CA7RIEL & Paco Amoroso; ¿Dónde es el after? — Rawayana; Puerta Abierta — Kany García; ¿Y ahora qué? — Alejandro Sanz; LO QUE ME FALTA POR LLORAR — Grupo Frontera; La 8va Maravilla — Arcángel; De Rey A Rey — Alejandro Fernández; Almas — Carlos Rivera; EQUILIBRIVM — Anitta; Femme Fatale — Mon Laferte; Julio Eterno — Juan Fernando Velasco	"CHÉVERE" — Aria Vega; "Dai Dai" — Shakira & Burna Boy; "LA VILLA" — Ryan Castro, Kapo & Gangsta; "BbY WOW" — Karol G, Judeline & Rusowsky; "La Más Bonita" — AA; "COSITA LINDA" — Elena Rose & Justin Quiles; "Tú Eres Ajena" — Eddy Herrera; "Superestrella" — Aitana; "La Perla" — Rosalía, Yahritza y su Esencia; "Inglés en Miami" — Rawayana; "Hasta que te conocí" — Juan Gabriel; "Coqueta" — Fuerza Regida & Grupo Frontera; "Él me mintió" — Amanda Miguel; "Saca Punta" — Arlene MC X Alofoke Music X Jey One X La Mas Doll; "Dichavate" — Ya Ice Dilan X Rey Tony X Helabusador
Composer of the Year	Best Song for a Video Game, Series or Movie
Edgar Barrera; Cristian Maldonado (Master Chris); Keytin; Joss Favela; Horacio Palencia; Pablo Preciado; Eden Muñoz; Marcela de la Garza; Gian Marco; Elena Rose; Justin Quiles; Leonel García; José Luis Roma; Jorge Drexler	"Zoo" — Shakira — Zootopia 2; "EOO" — Bad Bunny — Spiderman; "Pájaro Cantor" — Ácido Pantera & Cantora de Barro; "Qué Más Quieres" — The Warning — WWE 2K26; "La primera vez" — Juliana y Chromeo; "Sentimiento Raro" — Julieta Venegas — Nadie Nos Va A Extrañar; "Hasta que me quede sin voz" — Leiva; "Ahí estabas tú" — Carín León — Doménica Montero; "Colors" — Maluma — EA Sports 2026; "Almas" — Carlos Rivera — Hermanas: Un Amor Compartido; "Sin Despedida" — Alejandro Fernández & Carlos Rivera — Mi Rival; "ESTOY PUTIAO" — Feid, Sky Rompiendo & Dei V; "Mentiras" — Daniela Romo — Belinda
Fandom of the Year	Best Religious Song
La Perversa — VibraPerversa; Michael Flores — Michaelistas; Shirley Arica — Shililovers; Pablo Heredia — Pablovers; Yailin — Chiviricas; Pamela López — Team KittyPam; Dani Barranco — Club de fans de Dani Barranco; J Lexis — Team JLexis; Kenia Os — Las Kenini; Danna — Dreamiers; Belinda — Belifans; Carlos Rivera — Riveristas; CD9 — Coders; Karol G — Bichotas; Tini — Tinistas; Mario Girón — Gironers; Andreina Bravo — Team Andreina; Yahaira Plasencia — Yahalovers; Anitta — Aniitters; Cazzu — Cazzu Army	"Voy Con Jesús" — Yele, Alex Zurdo; "Quién Contra Mí" — Elena Rose; "La Respuesta" — Gocho; "Si Volviera Jesús" — Víctor Manuelle; "Todo Va Estar Bien" — Barak, Tercer Cielo; "Despiértame" — Jesús Adrián Romero; "ABCD" — Daddy Yankee feat. Alex Zurdo; "Ayer Hablé con Dios" — Corridos del Rey; "Solo hay uno" — Joel Rocco y Enoc Parra
