= LOS40 Music Awards for Best Latin New Artist =

Spanish music awards

LOS40 Music Award for Best Latin New Artist
- Awarded for: Best in Spanish and International music
- Country: Spain
- Presented by: Los 40
- First award: 2020
- Currently held by: Kidd Voodoo (2026)
- Website: los40.com/tag/los40_music_awards/a/

The LOS40 Music Award for Best Latin New Artist is an honor presented annually since 2020 by Los 40 as part of the LOS40 Music Awards, which are considered Spain's most important music awards today.

== Winners and nominees ==
| Year | Artist | Nominees |
|---|---|---|
| 2020 | (Colombia) Camilo | (Puerto Rico) Rauw Alejandro; (Spain) Omar Montes; (Argentina) Nicki Nicole; (Puerto Rico) Jay Wheeler |
| 2021 | (Argentina) Nicki Nicole | (Argentina) Nathy Peluso; (United States) Mariah Angeliq; (Argentina) María Becerra; (Puerto Rico) Nio García |
| 2022 | (Argentina) Tiago PZK | (Argentina) Emilia; (Colombia) Feid; (Puerto Rico) Mora; (Chile) Polimá Westcoast; (Colombia) Ryan Castro |
| 2023 | (Puerto Rico) Young Miko | (Argentina) Lil Cake; (Mexico) Peso Pluma; (Argentina) Milo J; (Mexico) Yng Lvcas; (Argentina) Emilia |
| 2024 | (Colombia) Kapo | (Chile) Cris MJ; (Puerto Rico) Dei V; (Colombia) Ela Taubert; (United States) Gonzy; (Honduras) Key Key |
| 2025 | (Puerto Rico) De La Rose | (Puerto Rico) Omar Courtz; (Venezuela) Alleh & Yorghaki; (Spain) Pikete; (Argentina) Ca7riel & Paco Amoroso; (Argentina) Luck Ra |
