= LOS40 Music Awards for Best Urban Artist =

Annual Spanish music award

LOS40 Music Award for Best Urban Artist
- Awarded for: Best in Spanish and International music
- Country: Spain
- Presented by: Los 40
- First award: 2019
- Currently held by: Mora (2025)
- Website: los40.com/tag/los40_music_awards/a/

The LOS40 Music Award for Best Urban Artist is an honor presented annually by Los 40 as part of the LOS40 Music Awards, which are considered Spain's most important music awards today.

It was introduced in 2019 as the Los40 Urban Award in the now-defunct Mixed Global category before being given its current name and added to the expanded Latin category.

== Winners and nominees ==
Year	Artist	Nominees
LOS40 Urban Award
2019	(United States) Nicky Jam	(Colombia) J Balvin; (Spain) Juan Magán; (Puerto Rico) Daddy Yankee; (Brazil) Anitta
Best Urban Artist
2020	(Spain) C. Tangana	(Puerto Rico) Bad Bunny; (Colombia) Karol G; (Colombia) Maluma; (Puerto Rico) Ozuna
