= Young Miko =

Puerto Rican rapper (born 1997)

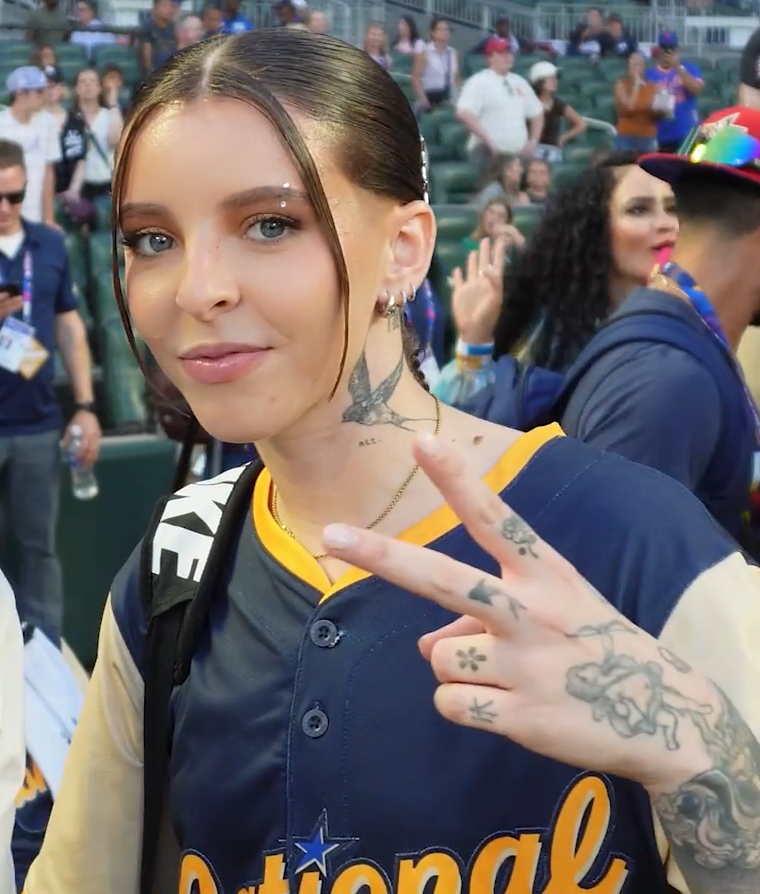
- Young Miko at the 2025 All-Star Legends & Celebrity Softball Game

Background information
- Also known as: Baby Miko
- Born: María Victoria Ramírez de Arellano Cardona; November 8, 1997 (age 29); Añasco, Puerto Rico
- Genres: Latin trap; Latin R&B; reggaeton
- Occupations: Rapper; singer; songwriter; footballer
- Years active: 2018–present
- Labels: The Wave; Jak; Sony Latin; Capitol
- Website: youngmiko.com
Association football career
- Height: 5 ft 5 in (1.65 m)
- Positions: Right back; defensive midfielder
Youth career
- Indias de Mayagüez
College career
Years	Team	Apps	(Gls)
2017	UPR Río Piedras	1+	(1+)
Senior career*
Years	Team	Apps	(Gls)
2013–2014	Indias de Mayagüez		
2016	Challengers SC		
International career
- Puerto Rico U17
2015	Puerto Rico U20	1+	(0)
- * Club domestic league appearances and goals as of June 21, 2015

María Victoria Ramírez de Arellano Cardona (born November 8, 1997), known professionally as Young Miko, is a Puerto Rican rapper, singer, songwriter and former footballer. In 2022, she released her debut extended play, Trap Kitty, featuring Latin trap tracks. In April 2024, she released her debut studio album, Att., featuring collaborations with Feid, Jowell & Randy, Villano Antillano, Elena Rose, and Dei V. In November 2025, she released her second studio album, Do Not Disturb, which featured a collaboration with Eladio Carrión.

== Early life ==
Young Miko was born in Añasco, Puerto Rico. Her family often listened to rock, hip hop, and reggaeton, which helped her realize that music was her passion. She began writing poetry while attending a Catholic school in Mayagüez, Puerto Rico. She played on the Puerto Rican women's national football team from the ages of 13 to 18, often leaving school early to make it to practices in the municipality of Bayamón.

Besides football, Young Miko played multiple sports as a child, including karate, basketball, tennis, and ping pong. There was no girls' basketball league, so she had to play on a boys team.

In high school, she recalls that she was introverted and did not have many friends, finding it difficult to befriend girls.

Young Miko attended the University of Puerto Rico, Río Piedras Campus, majoring in drawing. However, budget cuts forced her department to remove credits off her major, so she transferred to the Interamerican University of Puerto Rico in San Germán to study visual arts.

== Career ==
Ramírez de Arellano started rapping her lyrics in 2018 to beats she downloaded from YouTube. She uploaded these initial songs to SoundCloud under the name Young Miko. Her first song was "Quiero". Meanwhile, she worked as a tattoo artist for five years to pay bills and music studio costs. She posted her work to Instagram, under the handle @samuraimiko.

In 2022, Young Miko released her debut extended play, Trap Kitty, featuring Latin trap tracks. She incorporates her identity and interests into her music including anime, urban music, and The Powerpuff Girls.

It was later announced that her record label, The Wave Music Group, had signed a long-term distribution agreement with Capitol Music Group (CMG) to support her upcoming release.

In 2023, Young Miko's reggaeton song "Classy 101", a collaboration with Colombian artist Feid, reached number 99 on the Billboard Hot 100, marking her first appearance on the chart. Young Miko opened for Karol G on her Mañana Será Bonito Tour on some dates of the U.S. leg. She also joined her onstage to perform "Dispo". She was featured on the album of Puerto Rican rapper Bad Bunny, Nadie Sabe Lo Que Va a Pasar Mañana, with the song "Fina". The song peaked at number 14 on the Billboard Hot 100, marking her second entry on the chart.

Young Miko performed at Coachella in 2024. Accompanied by a band, she delivered some of her most popular titles, including the "Chulo" remix and her Bizarrap session, "Young Miko: Bzrp Music Sessions, Vol. 58". On April 24, Young Miko released her debut album, Att. The title is shorthand for atentamente, which means “sincerely” in Spanish. It features collaborations with Dei V, Feid, Jowell & Randy, Elena Rose and Villano Antillano. The album peaked at number 9 on the Billboard Top Latin Albums and number 129 on the Billboard 200.

Young Miko has also expressed her interest in acting. Her first acting appearance was in the film Sneaks, where she voiced Tiffany alongside other artists like Mustard, Swae Lee, and Roddy Ricch.

In 2025, Young Miko performed at the Governors Ball Music Festival in Queens, NY, and Lollapalooza in Chicago. The previous night, she performed at a sold-out aftershow featuring guest band Latin Mafia at the Aragon Ballroom. At the festival, she also met the girl group Katseye, whom she collaborated with for the "Gabriela" remix. In September, she became the first Puerto Rican Council of Fashion Designers of America ambassador.

On November 7, 2025, a day before her 28th birthday, Young Miko released her second studio album, Do Not Disturb. Its 16 tracks demonstrate intense production that reflect the chaos around the artist, and she describes the album as "Scorpio-coded".

In December 2025, Young Miko headlined José Miguel Agrelot Coliseum, often referred to as "El Choli", for the first time. The two night shows were sold out and featured multiple guest performances. Night one guest performances included Bad Gyal, Eladio Carrión, Elena Rose, Tokischa, and Villano Antillano. Night two guest performances included Bad Gyal, Feid, Kany García, Mora, Omar Courtz, Tainy, Tokischa, and Villano Antillano; with Rauw Alejandro being in attendance.

Young Miko appeared at the Super Bowl LX halftime show alongside Pedro Pascal, Karol G, and other Latin American celebrities.

In March 2026, Gap launched a new campaign with Miko as the star. The campaign's name, Sweats Like This, features a slight remix of her hit single "WASSUP". This is the first Spanish-language video campaign by Gap and she is the brand's first openly lesbian Latina face.

On May 29, 2026, Miko released a deluxe version of her sophomore album, titled Do Not Disturb: Late Checkout. The deluxe edition adds six new songs and includes collaborations with Clarent, De La Rose, Rauw Alejandro, and Destin Conrad.

== Personal life ==
Ramírez de Arellano is openly lesbian. Two of her closest friends are Mariana Beatriz López Crespo and Diego Amaury López Crespo (known as "Mauro"), siblings who work as her manager and principal producer, respectively. Mariana López Crespo first met Ramírez de Arellano in 2012 and became friends through the Puerto Rican women's national football team. In 2018, when Ramírez de Arellano was just starting to make music, Mariana connected her with Mauro, who was starting to produce at that time. They've been a team ever since.

== Tours ==
Headlining

- XOXO Tour (2024/2025)
- Late Checkout Tour (2026)

List of XOXO tour concerts, showing date, city, country, and venue
Date (2024)	City	Country	Venue
July 31	Denver, CO	United States	Fillmore Auditorium
August 3	Wheatland, CA	United States	Hard Rock Live Sacramento
August 6	San Jose, CA	United States	San Jose Civic Center
August 9	Phoenix, AZ	United States	Arizona Financial Theater
August 10	Las Vegas, NV	United States	Fountainebleu Las Vegas
August 12	San Diego, CA	United States	Cal Coast Credit Union Open Air Theater
August 15	Los Angeles, CA	United States	Peacock Theater
August 19	Austin, TX	United States	Moody Amphitheater
August 20	Houston, TX	United States	Smart Financial Centre
August 21	Irving, TX	United States	The Pavilion at Toyota Music Factory
August 24	Rosemont, IL	United States	Rosemont Theater
August 27	New York City, NY	United States	The Theater at Madison Square Garden
August 30	Bridgeport, CT	United States	Hartford HealthCare Amphitheater
August 31	Philadelphia, PA	United States	The Met
September 1	Boston, MA	United States	Leader Bank Pavilion
September 4	Washington, D.C.	United States	The Theater at MGM National Harbor
September 6	Atlanta, GA	United States	Coca-Cola Roxy
September 7	Orlando, FL	United States	Hard Rock Live Orlando
September 11	Hollywood, FL	United States	Hard Rock Live at Seminole Hard Rock Hotel & Casino
September 28	La Romana	Dominican Republic	Altos de Chavón
October 2	Tegucigalpa	Honduras	Bazar del Sábado Tegucigalpa
October 4	San Salvador	El Salvador	Complejo Estadio Cuscatlán
October 5	Guatemala City	Guatemala	Explanada Cayalá
October 10	Panama City	Panama	Plaza Amador
October 12	San José	Costa Rica	Anfiteatro Coca-Cola
October 23	Montevideo	Uruguay	Antel Arena
October 25	Cordoba	Argentina	Quality Arena
October 27	Rosario	Argentina	Anfiteatro Municipal
October 31	Viña del Mar	Chile	Anfiteatro Quinta Vergara
November 2	Lima	Peru	Costa 21
May 18, 2025	Madrid	Spain	Movistar Arena
May 23, 2025	Barcelona	Spain	Sant Jordi Club

List of cancelled concerts, showing date, city, country and venue
Date (2024)	City	Country	Venue
October 20	Caracas	Venezuela	Terraza del CCCT
November 8	Medellín	Colombia	Centro de Eventos de la Macarena

List of Late Checkout tour concerts, showing date, city, country, and venue
Date (2026)	City	Country	Venue
July 3	Roskilde	Denmark	Roskilde Festival
July 4	Nuremberg	Germany	Latin Airport Festival
July 5	Cologne	Germany	Carlswerk Victoria
July 8	Amsterdam	Netherlands	Melkweg
July 10	London	United Kingdom	Outernet London
July 12	Paris	France	Bataclan (theatre)
July 15	Montreux	Switzerland	Montreux Jazz Festival
July 16	Bern	Switzerland	Gurtenfestival
July 18	Berlin	Germany	Lollapalooza
July 19	Dour	Belgium	Dour Festival
July 23	Milan	Italy	Magnolia Club
July 25	A Coruña	Spain	Morriña Festival
July 27	València	Spain	Far València
August 2	St. Charles, Iowa	United States	Hinterland Music Festival
September 17	Guadalajara	Mexico	Arena VFG
September 19	Monterrey	Mexico	Arena Monterrey
September 22	Mexico City	Mexico	Palacio de los Deportes
September 25	Mérida	Mexico	Foro GNP Seguros
October 13	Seattle, WA	United States	Climate Pledge Arena
October 15	San Francisco, CA	United States	Chase Center
October 17	Inglewood, CA	United States	Intuit Dome
October 18	Phoenix, Arizona	United States	Mortgage Matchup Center
October 22	San Antonio, TX	United States	Freeman Coliseum
October 24	Houston, TX	United States	Toyota Center
October 28	Miami, FL	United States	Kaseya Center
October 29	Orlando, FL	United States	Kia Center
October 31	Atlanta, GA	United States	State Farm Arena
November 1	Charlotte, NC	United States	Spectrum Center
November 4	Philadelphia, PA	United States	Xfinity Mobile Arena
November 5	Brooklyn, NY	United States	Barclays Center

List of canceled concerts, showing date, city, country, and venue
Date (2026)	City	Country	Venue
July 11	Málaga	Spain	Urban Paradise Festival

Opening act

- Mañana Será Bonito Tour (2023)
- Hit Me Hard and Soft: The Tour (2025)

== Discography ==
=== Album ===
Title	Details	Peak chart positions		
Title	Details	US	US Latin	SPA
Att.	Release: April 5, 2024; Record label: The Wave, Capitol; Formats: CD, digital download, streaming, vinyl record	129	9	10
Do Not Disturb	Release: November 7, 2025; Record label: The Wave, Capitol; Formats: CD, digital download, streaming	—	23	49
Do Not Disturb: Late Checkout	Release: May 29, 2026; Record label: The Wave, Capitol; Formats: CD, digital download, streaming, vinyl record		36	

=== EPs ===
Title	Details
Trap Kitty	Release: July 22, 2022; Record label: The Wave, Jak, Sony Latin; Formats: CD, digital download, streaming, vinyl record

=== Singles ===
==== As lead artist ====
Title	Year	Peak chart positions							Certifications	Album
Title	Year	ARG	BOL	COL	CHI	SPA	US	US Latin	Certifications	Album
"105 Freestyle" (with Caleb Calloway)	2021	—	—	—	—	—	—	—		Non-album singles
"Vendetta" (with Villano Antillano)	2021	—	—	—	—	—	—	—		Non-album singles
"Katana" (with Leebrian)	2021	—	—	—	—	—	—	—		Non-album singles
"Puerto Rican Mami"	2021	—	—	—	—	—	—	—		Non-album singles
"Besties" (with Joyce Santana)	2022									A Quien Pueda Interesar
"Stripper X" (with Lil Joujou)	2022	—	—	—	—	—	—	—		Non-album singles
"2seater" (with Young Martino and Juanka)	2022	—	—	—	—	—	—	—		Non-album singles
"Un Poquito" (with Alejo)	2022	—	—	—	—	—	—	—		Non-album singles
"Castigada" (with Catalyna and Cory)	2022	—	—	—	—	—	—	—		Non-album singles
"Standard"	2022	—	—	—	—	—	—	—		Trap Kitty
"Riri"	2022	—	—	—	—	—	—	—	RIAA: Platinum (Latin)	Trap Kitty
"Besties (Remix)" (with Joyce Santana and Villano Antillano featuring Yovngchimi and Luar la L)	2022	—	—	—	—	—	—	—		Non-album singles
"Condado" (with Chris Jedi and Lunay)	2022	—	—	—	—	—	—	—		Non-album singles
"Salvaje" (with Lyanno)	2022	—	—	—	—	—	—	—		Non-album singles
"La Mini" (with Casper Mágico)	2022	—	—	—	—	—	—	—		Los Magicos
"Aprovéchame, BB" (with VF7)	2022	—	—	—	—	—	—	—		Non-album singles
"Kachipun" (with Metalingüística and Akapellah)	2022	—	—	—	—	—	—	—		Non-album singles
"De Pasajero" (with Club 16 and Jota Rosa featuring Kris Floyd and Chanell)	2022	—	—	—	—	—	—	—		Club 16, Jota Rosa Presents Vol. 2
"Amandita" (with Omar Courtz)	2022	—	—	—	—	—	—	—		Non-album single
"Cuando Te Toca" (with Yandel)	2023	—	—	—	—	—	—	—		Resistencia
"Déjanos Pasar" (with PJ Sin Suela)	2023	—	—	—	—	—	—	—		Chinchorreo, Vol. 1
"Big Booty" (with Hozwal and Lil Geniuz)	2023	—	—	—	—	—	—	—	RIAA: Platinum (Latin)	Non-album single
"6B" (with Los G4 and Jovaan featuring Go Get Music)	2023	—	—	—	—	—	—	—		Certified
"Pretty Bad Bitch" (with Brray)	2023	—	—	—	—	—	—	—		El Alma De La Fiesta
"Lisa"	2023	—	—	—	—	58	—	—	RIAA: Platinum (Latin)	Non-album single
"Curita"	2023									Att.
"Classy 101" (with Feid)	2023	9	6	2	2	6	99	15	PROMUSICAE: 2× Platinum	Ferxxocalipsis
"Dirty"	2023	—	—	—	—	—	—	—		Non-album single
"Brinca" (with Cazzu)	2023	66	—	—	—	—	—	—		Nena Trampa (deluxe)
"8 AM" (with Nicki Nicole)	2023	25	—	—	—	—	—	—		Alma
"ID" (with Jowell & Randy)	2023	—	—	—	—	—	—	—	RIAA: Platinum (Latin)	Att.
"Chulo, pt. 2" (with Bad Gyal and Tokischa)	2023	16	—	—	7	— (Note: Sales for the remix were included into the ones for the original version and not listed independently. "Chulo" entered at number 19 following the release of the remix (it had previously peaked at number 16) and was certified platinum.)	—	—	RIAA: 6× Platinum (Latin)	La joia
"Colmillo" (with Tainy and J Balvin featuring Jowell & Randy)	2023	—	—	—	51	—	—	—		Data
"Mañana" (with Tainy and the marias)	2023	—	—	—	—	—	—	—	—	Data
"Wiggy"	2023	27	—	—	—	66	—	—	RIAA: Gold (Latin)	Att.
"Tempo" (with Marshmello)	2023	—	—	—	—	—	—	—		Sugar Papi
"CC - Remix" (with Lil Joujou, Omar Courtz, Bryant Myers and De La Ghetto)	2023	—	—	—	—	—	—	—		Demon Time
"Señorita" (with Wisin)	2023	—	—	—	—	—	—	—		Mr. W
"Young Miko: Bzrp Music Sessions, Vol. 58" (with Bizarrap)	2024	3	6	12	7	1	— (Note: "Young Miko, Bzrp Music Sessions, Vol. 58" did not enter the Billboard Hot 100, but peaked at number nine on the Bubbling Under Hot 100 chart.)	20		Non-album single
"En Esta Boca" (with Kany Garcia)	2024	—	—	—	—	—	—	—		García
"Sorry Es Que Soy Bipolarrr" (with Robi)	2024	—	—	—	—	—	—			Non-album single
"Sucia" (with Kehlani and Jill Scott)	2024	—	—	—	—	—	—	—		Crash
"Come Play" (with Stray Kids and Tom Morello)	2024	—	—	—	—	—	—	—		Arcane League of Legends: Season 2
"Woahh" (with Rvssian and Omar Courtz featuring Clarent)	2025	—	—	—	—	—	—	—		Non-album single
"AMG" (with Eladio Carrion)	2025	—	—	—	—	—	—	—		Don KBRN
"En La City" (with Trueno)	2025	—	—	—	—	—	—	—		El Último Baile (deluxe)
"Wassup"	2025	—	—	—	—	—	—	—		Do Not Disturb
"Jetski" (with Randy Nota Loca)	2025	—	—	—	—	—	—	—		Non-album single
"Birthday Behavior" (with Bia)	2025	—	—	—	—	—	—	—		Bianca
"Meiomi"	2025	—	—	—	—	—	—	—		Do Not Disturb
"Likey Likey"	2025	—	—	—	—	—	—	—		Do Not Disturb
"No Vamo' a Cambiar" (with Los Pleneros de la Cresta)	2025	—	—	—	—	—	—	—		Estampas De Mi Tierra
"Duro" (with Skrillex)	2026	—	—	—	—	—	—	—		Soma
"Safada" (with Luísa Sonza)	2026	—	—	—	—	—	—	—		Brutal Paraíso
"BIAF"	2026	—	—	—	—	—	—	—		Do Not Disturb: Late Checkout

==== As featured artist ====
List of singles as featured artist
Title	Year	Album
"Gabriela - Young Miko Remix" (Katseye featuring Young Miko)	2025	Non-album single
"After (featuring Young Miko)" (Conep featuring Young Miko	2026	Non-album single

=== Other charted songs ===
Title	Year	Peak chart positions					Album
Title	Year	COL	SPA	US	US Latin	WW	Album
"Dispo" (with Karol G)	2023	20	70	— (Note: "Dispo" did not enter the Billboard Hot 100, but peaked at number three on the Billboard Bubbling Under Hot 100 chart.)	22	174	Mañana Será Bonito (Bichota Season)
"Fina" (with Bad Bunny)	2023	3	5	14	2	6	Nadie Sabe Lo Que Va a Pasar Mañana
"Offline" (with Feid)	2024	22	18	—	33	123	Att. (album)
"BnB" (with Clarent)	2026	—	9	—	—	—	Do Not Disturb: Late Checkout

=== Other album appearances ===
Title	Year	Album
"Kilimanjaro" (with Arcángel)	2022	Sr. Santos
"Sale el Sol"	2022	Especial Musical de Popular: Mas Que 30
"Gata" (with Central Cee)	2025	Can't Rush Greatness
"TOA" (with Mora)	2025	LO MISMO DE SIEMPRE
"Gyoza" (with Elena Rose)	2025	Bendito Verano
"MVP"	2026	2026 World Baseball Classic
"Te llevo tatuada" (with Jorge Drexler)	2026	Taraca
"Safada" (with Luísa Sonza)	2026	BRUTAL PARAÍSO
"die 4 u" (with Hayley Kiyoko)	2026	girls like girls the album

== Awards and nominations ==
Award	Year	Category	Nominated work	Result	Ref.
Billboard Latin Music Awards	2023	Hot Latin Songs Artist of the Year, Female	Young Miko	Nominated	
Billboard Latin Music Awards	2024	Hot Latin Songs Artist of the Year, Female	Young Miko	Nominated	
Billboard Latin Music Awards	2024	New Artist of the Year	Young Miko	Nominated	
Billboard Latin Music Awards	2024	Top Latin Albums Artist of the Year, Female	Young Miko	Nominated	
Billboard Latin Music Awards	2025	Hot Latin Songs Artist of the Year, Female	Young Miko	Nominated	
Billboard Latin Music Awards	2026	Top Latin Albums Artist of the Year, Female	Young Miko	Nominated	
Billboard Latin Women in Music	2026	Unstoppable Artist	Young Miko	Won	
Grammy Awards	2025	Best Música Urbana Album	Att.	Nominated	
Grammy Awards	2026	Best Música Urbana Album	Do Not Disturb: Late Checkout	Pending	
GLAAD Media Award	2026	Outstanding Music Artist	Young Miko	Won	
Heat Latin Music Awards	2023	Musical Promise	Young Miko	Nominated	
Heat Latin Music Awards	2024	Best Female Artist	Young Miko	Nominated	
Heat Latin Music Awards	2024	Best Urban Artist	Young Miko	Nominated	
Heat Latin Music Awards	2024	Best Artist North Region	Young Miko	Nominated	
Heat Latin Music Awards	2024	Best Collaboration	"Young Miko: Bzrp Music Sessions, Vol. 58" (with Bizarrap)	Nominated	
iHeartRadio Music Awards	2024	Best New Latin Artist	Young Miko	Won	
Latin American Music Awards	2024	New Artist of the Year	Young Miko	Won	
Latin American Music Awards	2024	Streaming Artist of the Year	Young Miko	Nominated	
Latin American Music Awards	2024	Favorite Urban Artist	Young Miko	Nominated	
Latin American Music Awards	2024	Global Latin Song of the Year	"Classy 101" (with Feid)	Won	
Latin American Music Awards	2024	Best Urban Collaboration	"Classy 101" (with Feid)	Won	
Latin Grammy Awards	2024	Best Urban Fusion/Performance	"Young Miko: Bzrp Music Sessions, Vol. 58" (with Bizarrap)	Nominated	
Latin Grammy Awards	2025	Best Urban Song	"En la City" (with Trueno)	Nominated	
Latin Grammy Awards	2026	Best Urban Music Album	Do Not Disturb: Late Checkout	Nominated	
Los 40 Music Awards	2023	Best Latin New Act	Young Miko	Won	
Los 40 Music Awards	2023	Best Latin Urban Song	"Classy 101" (with Feid)	Won	
Los 40 Music Awards	2023	Best Latin Urban Collaboration	"Classy 101" (with Feid)	Nominated	
Los 40 Music Awards	2024	Best Latin Urban Act	Young Miko	Nominated	
Los 40 Music Awards	2024	Best Latin Album	Att.	Nominated	
Los 40 Music Awards	2024	Best Latin Urban Collaboration	"Offline" (with Feid)	Nominated	
MTV Europe Music Awards	2023	Best Caribbean Act	Young Miko	Won	
MTV Europe Music Awards	2024	Best Caribbean Act	Young Miko	Won	
MTV Millennial Awards	2023	Flow Artist	Young Miko	Nominated	
MTV Millennial Awards	2023	Artist to Watch	Young Miko	Nominated	
MTV Millennial Awards	2023	Reggaeton Hit	"Classy 101" (with Feid)	Nominated	
MTV Millennial Awards	2024	MIAW Artist	Young Miko	Nominated	
MTV Millennial Awards	2024	Flow Artist	Young Miko	Won	
MTV Millennial Awards	2024	"La Patrona" of the Year	Young Miko	Nominated	
MTV Millennial Awards	2024	Bellakeo Supremo	"Offline" (with Feid)	Nominated	
MTV Millennial Awards	2024	Collaboration of the Year	"Offline" (with Feid)	Nominated	
MTV Millennial Awards	2024	Collaboration of the Year	"Young Miko: Bzrp Music Sessions, Vol. 58" (with Bizarrap)	Nominated	
MTV Millennial Awards	2024	Video of the Year	"Curita"	Nominated	
Premios Juventud	2023	The New Generation – Female	Young Miko	Nominated	
Premios Juventud	2023	Girl Power	"Brinca" (with Cazzu)	Nominated	
Premios Juventud	2023	Trap Song	"Riri"	Nominated	
Premios Juventud	2023	Best Urban Album – Female	Trap Kitty	Nominated	
Premios Juventud	2024	The Perfect Mix	"En Esta Boca" (with Kany García)	Nominated	
Premios Juventud	2024	Girl Power	"En Esta Boca" (with Kany García)	Nominated	
Premios Juventud	2024	Best Urban Album	Att.	Nominated	
Premios Juventud	2025	Girl Power	"Chulo Pt. 2" (with Bad Gyal & Tokischa)	Nominated	
Premios Juventud	2026	Female Artist	Young Miko	Nominated	
Premios Juventud	2026	Girl Power	"Gabriela (Young Miko remix)" (with Katseye)	Nominated	
Premios Juventud	2026	Omg Collaboration	"Birthday Behavior" (with Bia)	Nominated	
Premios Juventud	2026	Best Urban Album	Do Not Disturb	Won	
Premios Lo Nuestro	2023	New Artist – Female	Young Miko	Nominated	
Premios Lo Nuestro	2024	Urban Female Artist of the Year	Young Miko	Nominated	
Premios Lo Nuestro	2024	Urban Song of the Year	"Classy 101" (with Feid)	Won	
Premios Lo Nuestro	2025	Female Urban Artist of the Year	Young Miko	Nominated	
Premios Lo Nuestro	2025	Best Female Combination	"Chulo Pt. 2" (with Bad Gyal & Tokischa)	Nominated	
Premios Lo Nuestro	2025	Urban Song of the Year	"Chulo Pt. 2" (with Bad Gyal & Tokischa)	Nominated	
Premios Lo Nuestro	2025	Pop-Urban Best "EuroSong"	"Chulo Pt. 2" (with Bad Gyal & Tokischa)	Won	
Premios Lo Nuestro	2025	Best Urban Trap/Hip Hop Song	"Wiggy"	Nominated	
Premios Lo Nuestro	2025	Urban Album of the Year	Att.	Nominated	
Premios Lo Nuestro	2026	Female Urban Artist of the Year	Young Miko	Nominated	
Premios Lo Nuestro	2026	Best Urban Trap/Hip Hop Song	"En La City" (with Trueno)	Nominated	
Premios Lo Nuestro	2026	Urban Collaboration of the Year	"AMG" (with Eladio Carrión)	Nominated	
Premios Lo Nuestro	2026	Urban Collaboration of the Year	"WOAHH" (with Rvssian, Omar Courtz & Clarent)	Nominated	
Premios Nuestra Tierra	2024	Best Urban Song	"Classy 101" (with Feid)	Nominated	
Premios Nuestra Tierra	2024	Best Urban Collaboration	"Classy 101" (with Feid)	Nominated	
Premios Tu Música Urbano	2023	Top Rising Star — Female	Young Miko	Won	
Premios Tu Música Urbano	2023	Top Artist — Trap	Young Miko	Nominated	
Premios Tu Música Urbano	2023	Top Song — Trap	"Lisa"	Nominated	
Premios Tu Música Urbano	2023	Top Song — Trap	"Big Booty" (with Hozwal and Lil Geniuz)	Nominated	
Premios Tu Música Urbano	2023	Video of the Year	"Riri"	Nominated	
Rolling Stone en Español Awards	2023	Promising Artist of the Year	Young Miko	Nominated	
Rolling Stone en Español Awards	2023	Voice of the Audience	Young Miko	Nominated	
