= Primera Musa =

Studio album by Omar Courtz
- Released: September 20, 2024
- Recorded: 2023–2024
- Genres: Latin trap; reggaeton
- Length: 57:28
- Label: Rimas • Mr 305

Omar Courtz chronology
Invierno (2018)	Primera Musa (2024)	Por Si Mañana No Estoy (2026)

Singles from Primera Musa
- 1. "Una Noti" Released: January 12, 2024; 2. "Luces de Colores" Released: February 14, 2024; 3. "Drippeo Kbron" Released: March 29, 2024; 4. "Serio con Ese Q" Released: July 25, 2024; 5. "Goddess" Released: September 19, 2024; 6. "Qué Vas Hacer Hoy?" Released: September 20, 2024

Primera Musa (stylized in all caps; transl. First Muse) is the debut studio album by Puerto Rican singer-songwriter Omar Courtz. It was released through Rimas Entertainment on September 20, 2024. It features appearances from De la Rose, Dei V, Rauw Alejandro, Luar la L, Bryant Myers and Anuel AA.

The album spawned six singles including, "Una Noti", "Luces de Colores", "Drippeo Kbron" and "Serio Con Ese Q". A day prior to the album's release, Courtz released "Goddess" as the first single. "Qué Vas Hacer Hoy?" is a collaborative single with fellow Puerto Rican singer De La Rose, which was released alongside the album. It later gained widespread attention and formed part of a trend on TikTok, becoming the singer's first commercial breakthrough. In Spain, the single reached the second spot in the PROMUSICAE Top 100 Canciones chart.

Following the commercial success of "Qué Vas Hacer Hoy?", Courtz's previous singles rose to further attention, charting in Spain, Argentina and other countries across Latin America. He followed Primera Musa with his second studio album, Por Si Mañana No Estoy (2026).

== Background and composition ==
Courtz cited the "magic" of debut albums, particularly those by Latin artists, including Bad Bunny's X 100pre (2018) and Myke Towers's El Final del Principio (2016), as his inspiration for Primera Musa. When asked about what his debut album was about, he stated:

"Primera Musa can mean many things. I leave it to the people to interpret it as they wish. It can be something you’ve lived, an experience, or it could be a woman."

— Courtz when asked about the concept of the album.

Primera Musa is an album consisting of Latin trap and reggaeton tracks, with incorporations of house, Jersey club and R&B, with themes revolving around Courtz's childhood experiences, family, his music career and his admiration for women.

== Track listing ==
Primera Musa track listing
No.	Title	Length
1.	"Intro" (with Kendo Kaponi)	2:44
2.	"Goddess"	2:35
3.	"Heavy"	3:18
4.	"Pienso en Sexxxo"	3:33
5.	"Una Noti"	3:20
6.	"Musa Elevá"	3:07
7.	"Drippeo Kbron" (with Dei V)	3:18
8.	"Piensas en Mí" (with Luar La L)	3:50
9.	"Polvos Que No Se Olvidan"	3:04
10.	"Interludio"	3:12
11.	"2K16" (with Bryant Myers)	4:05
12.	"Si Te Gustan las Gatas"	2:53
13.	"Aloca-T"	2:58
14.	"Sex Playlist 1" (with Rauw Alejandro)	3:57
15.	"Qué Vas Hacer Hoy?" (with De La Rose)	3:44
16.	"Serio Con Ese Q" (with Anuel AA)	4:07
17.	"Luces de Colores"	3:36
Total length:		57:28

Stylization notes

- All track titles are stylized in all caps and are letter spaced with no word spacing. For example, "Musa Elevá" is stylized as "M U S A E L E V Á". There are a few exceptions to this:
  - "Una Noti" is stylized as "UNA NOTi".
  - "Drippeo Kbron", "Serio Con Ese Q" and "Luces de Colores" are only stylized in all caps.
  - "Polvos Que No Se Olvidan" is stylized as "P o l v o s Q u e N o S e O l v i d a n".

== Charts ==
Chart performance for Primera Musa
Chart (2024)	Peak position
Spanish Albums (Promusicae)	1
US Billboard 200	101
US Top Latin Albums (Billboard)	8
US Latin Rhythm Albums (Billboard)	2

== Certifications ==
Certifications for Primera Musa
Region	Certification	Certified units/sales
Spain (Promusicae)	2× Platinum	80,000^{‡}
United States (RIAA)	Platinum (Latin)	60,000^{‡}
^{‡} Sales+streaming figures based on certification alone.
