= Omar Courtz =

Puerto Rican singer and songwriter (born 1997)

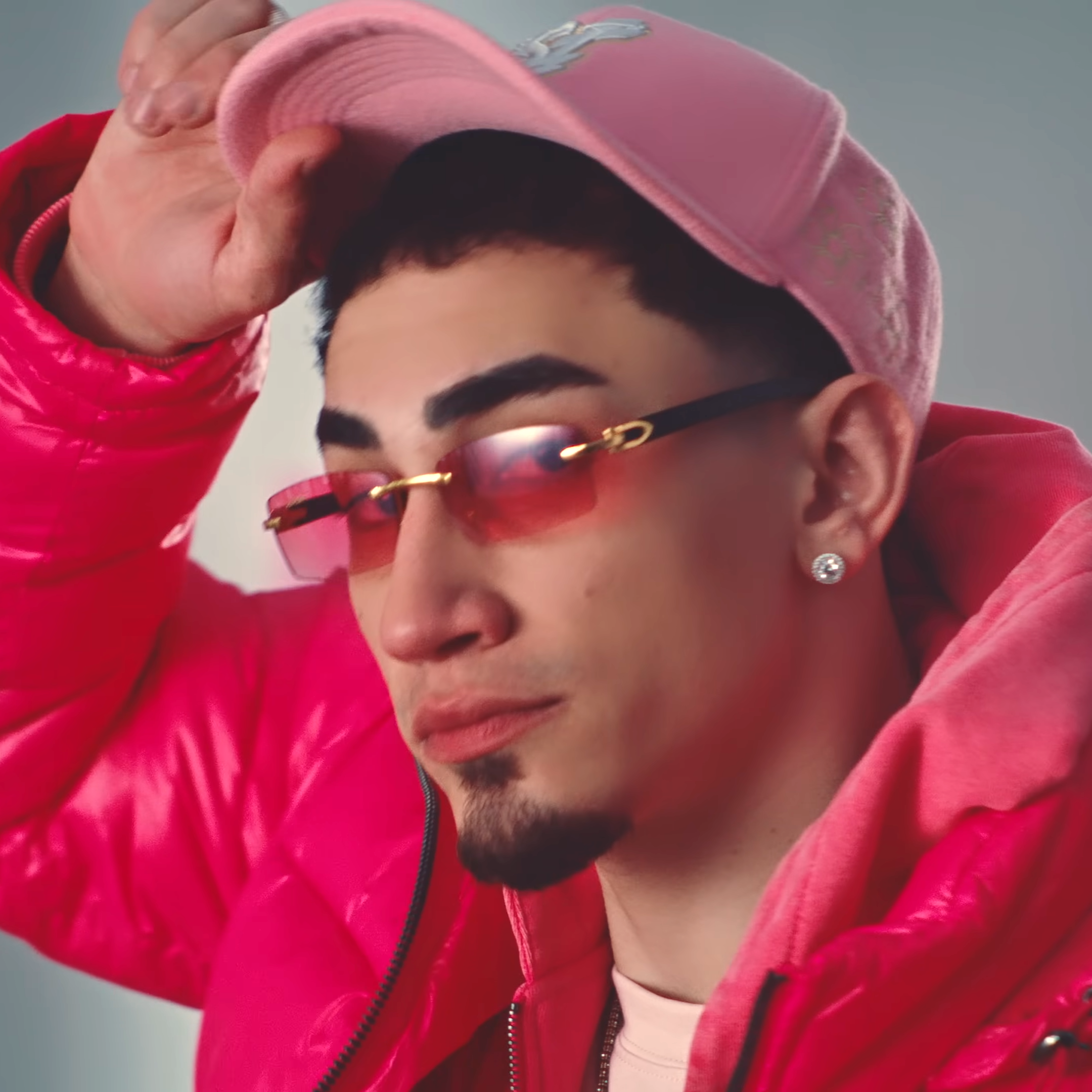
- Courtz in 2024

Background information
- Also known as: Ousi
- Born: Joshua Omar Medina Cortés; October 11, 1997 (age 29); Carolina, Puerto Rico
- Genres: Reggaeton; Latin R&B; Latin trap
- Occupations: Singer; songwriter
- Years active: 2017–present
- Labels: Mr. 305; Rimas

Joshua Omar Medina Cortés (born October 11, 1997), known professionally as Omar Courtz, or Ousi is a Puerto Rican singer and songwriter.

== Early life ==
Born on October 11, 1997, Courtz is a native of Carolina, Puerto Rico. During his adolescence, he worked at a clothing store known as Change, which gained popularity among reggaeton stars. Among the notable figures he encountered during his time there were his major inspirations, including Farruko, Anuel AA, and Ozuna. Courtz later found himself collaborating with some of these artists in his music career.

== Career ==
Courtz's debut, a SoundCloud track titled "Volvemos Otra Vez", released in 2017, swiftly gained local popularity, marking a significant early success in his music career. He persistently released music while simultaneously pursuing a degree in mechanical engineering at university, where he had been recruited for track and field. He garnered attention with releases like his viral single “En Tu Nota", released in 2020 amid the COVID-19 quarantine, and his four-track EP Invierno. This eventually led to a deal with Cuban-American singer Pitbull’s record label, Mr. 305. Courtz is the second Puerto Rican artist to be signed under the label.

Early in his career, Courtz secured a significant collaboration with the track "Ten Cuidado", featuring Pitbull, Farruko, el Alfa, and IAmChino. The song entered Billboard's Hot Latin Songs chart in 2021. Alongside collaborations with emerging artists like Young Miko, paopao, and Dei V, he has garnered recognition from more established acts, including Natti Natasha, Lenny Tavárez, and Justin Quiles. In 2023, Courtz collaborated with Daddy Yankee on "Beachy", Tainy on "Pasiempre", J Balvin on "En Alta", and Wisin on "Cuerpo a Cuerpo". In January 2024, Courtz released "Una Noti" via Mr. 305 Records.

In July 2023, it was announced that Courtz was among six artists chosen by TikTok for its "Elevate" music program, an initiative launched to support emerging artists that had gained substantial attention on the platform.

In May 2023, Courtz was nominated at the 2023 Premios Tu Música Urbano in the category of Top New Male Artist. Later that month, Billboard highlighted him as a rising artist to watch to watch. In January 2024, he was nominated for the Premio Lo Nuestro award for New Male Artist.

Courtz performed at the Latin American Music Awards of 2023 and at the 2023 Premios Juventud. In November, he took stage at the Coca Cola Flow Fest in Mexico City and headlined the "Ousi Fest" in San Juan, his first massive concert in Puerto Rico, marking the end of his tour in the United States.

== Artistry ==
Billboard has described Courtz as "versatile and innovative, backed by distinct deep vocals." Puerto Rican rapper Bad Bunny has similarly labeled him as "very versatile" and has highlighted Courtz's skill in channeling a polished sound reminiscent of urbano music's 2000s era. In reflecting on his musical approach, Courtz conveyed to Puerto Rican newspaper El Vocero, "I consistently direct my music towards women; there's a wealth of themes related to women that I find intriguing and personally resonate with."

== Discography ==
=== Albums ===
List of albums, with selected chart positions
Title	Album details	Peak chart positions			
Title	Album details	US	US Latin	US Latin Rhy.	SPA
Primera musa	Released: September 20, 2024; Labels: Mr. 305 Records, Rimas; Format: Digital download, streaming	101	8	2	1
Por Si Mañana No Estoy	Released: February 19, 2026; Labels: Mr. 305 Records, Rimas; Format: Digital download, streaming	22	3	3	1

=== Extended plays ===
List of extended plays
Title	EP details
Invierno	Released: December 21, 2018; Labels: Omar Courtz; Format: Digital download, streaming

=== Singles ===
==== As lead artist ====
List of singles as lead artist, with selected chart positions
Title	Year	Peak chart positions					Certifications	Album
Title	Year	US Bub.	US Latin	US Latin Rhy.	SPA	WW	Certifications	Album
"Rosas Negras"	2018	—	—	—	—	—		Non-album singles
"En Su Nota" (solo or remix with Brray)	2020	—	—	—	—	—		Non-album singles
"Dame Lu" (with Dei V)	2021	—	—	—	—	—		Non-album singles
"Los Dueños de la Calle" (with Yovngchimi and Dei V or remix with Jhayco featuring Myke Towers)	2022	—	—	—	—	—		Non-album singles
"Baby Schai" (solo or remix with Lenny Tavárez and Darell)	2022	—	—	—	—	—		Non-album singles
"Paola "Asesinos""	2022	—	—	—	—	—	RIAA: Platinum (Latin)	Non-album singles
"Jetski (remix)" (with ROA and Bryant Myers featuring Dei V)	2022	—	—	—	—	—	RIAA: Platinum (Latin)	Non-album singles
"Amandita" (with Young Miko)	2022	—	—	—	—	—	RIAA: Platinum (Latin)	Non-album singles
"En Bajita" (with Justin Quiles and Natti Natasha)	2023	—	—	—	—	—		Non-album singles
"Me Pone Mal" (with Pitbull)	2023	—	—	—	—	—		Trackhouse
"Beachy" (with Daddy Yankee)	2023	—	—	7	—	—		Non-album single
"Me Dice Daddy" (with Darell)	2023	—	—	—	—	—	RIAA: Gold (Latin)	Everybody Go to the Discotek
"En Alta" (with J Balvin and Yovngchimi featuring Quevedo, Mambo Kingz and DJ Luian)	2023	—	—	—	65	—		Rayo
"Kyoto" (with De La Rose and Haze)	2023	—	—	—	—	—		Non-album singles
"Bonnie and Clyde (remix)" (with iZaak and Luar la L)	2023	—	—	—	—	—	RIAA: Gold (Latin)	Non-album singles
"Una Noti"	2024	—	—	—	—	—		Primera Musa
"Luces de Colores"	2024	—	—	—	81	—	RIAA: Platinum (Latin)	Primera Musa
"Drippeo Kbron" (with Dei V)	2024	—	—	—	—	—		Primera Musa
"Serio con ese Q" (with Anuel AA)	2024	—	43	—	57	—		Primera Musa
"No Entiendo" (with Jhayco and Eladio Carrión)	2024	—	—	—	80	—		Le Clique: Vida Rockstar (X)
"Goddess"	2024	—	—	—	99	—		Primera Musa
"Veldá" (with Bad Bunny and Dei V)	2025	—	5	—	3	—	PROMUSICAE: 4× Platinum	
"Woahh" (with Rvssian and Young Miko featuring Clarent)	2025	—	—	—	36	—	PROMUSICAE: Gold	
"Nota" (with Jay Wheeler)	2025	—	—	—	36	—		Girasoles
"Amber" (with Dei V)	2025	—	—	—	44	—		Los Flavorz
"Nubes" (with De La Rose)	2025	—	39	—	9	—	PROMUSICAE: Platinum	FX De La Rose
"Comernos" (with Bad Gyal)	2025	—	—	—	5	—	PROMUSICAE: 2× Platinum	Por Si Mañana No Estoy
"Más Que Algo" (with Mora (singer))	2025	—	—	—	15	—	PROMUSICAE: Gold	Lo Mismo De Siempre
"Lokenecesitas" (with Saiko)	2025	—	—	—	8	—	PROMUSICAE: Platinum	Natsukashii Yoru
"Primer Lugar" (with Eladio Carrion)	2025	—	49	—	47	—		
"Scat Pack" (with Clarent)	2025	—	—	—	25	—	PROMUSICAE: Platinum	No vuelve a suceder (calenmiento pre-album)
"El Mundo Se Va a Acabar"	2025	—	43	—	28	—		Por Si Mañana No Estoy
"$uelta Gatita $uelta" (with Dei V and Clarent)	2025	—	34	20	7	—		Por Si Mañana No Estoy
"Dulces SueñoZzz (+Interludio)" (with Rubí)	2025	—	—	—	77	—		Por Si Mañana No Estoy
"Forever Tu Gantel" (with Ñengo Flow)	2025	—	17	11	2	—		Por Si Mañana No Estoy
"Koko"	2025	1	29	22	1	75		Por Si Mañana No Estoy
"Moonlight" (with Eladio Carrion)	2025	—	—	—	54	—		Por Si Mañana No Estoy
"Por Si Mañana No Estoy"	2025	—	30	18	15	—		Por Si Mañana No Estoy
"Si Estás Con Alguien"	2025	—	29	17	16	—		Por Si Mañana No Estoy
"Wo Oh Oh" (with ROA)	2025	—	23	14	6	—		Por Si Mañana No Estoy

==== As featured artist ====
List of singles as featured artist, with selected chart positions
Title	Year	Peak chart positions					Certifications	Album
Title	Year	US Bub.	US Latin	COL	SPA	WW	Certifications	Album
"Ten Cuidado" (Pitbull, Farruko and IAmChino featuring El Alfa and Omar Courtz)	2021	—	50	—	—	—	RIAA: Platinum (Latin); PROMUSICAE: Gold	Non-album single
"Pasiempre" (Tainy, Arcángel and Jhayco featuring Myke Towers, Omar Courtz and Arca)	2022	20	28	18	32	122	PROMUSICAE: Gold	Data
"Blinblineo" (Dímelo Flow, Sech, Dalex, Justin Quiles and Lenny Tavárez featuring Omar Courtz)	2024	—	—	—	—	—		The Academy: Segunda Misión
"Suelta" (Myke Towers featuring Omar Courtz)	2025	—	—	—	73	—		Non-album single

=== Other charted songs ===
List of other charted songs, with selected chart positions, showing year released and album name
Title	Year	Peak chart positions			Album
Title	Year	SPA	WW	US Latin	Album
"2K16" (with Bryant Myers)	2024	70	—	—	Primera Musa
"Que Vas Hacer Hoy?" (with De La Rose)	2024	2	54	9	Primera Musa
"Sex Playlist 1" (with Rauw Alejandro)	2024	62	—	—	Primera Musa

== Awards and nominations ==
Award	Year	Recipient(s) and nominee(s)	Category	Result	Ref.
Billboard Latin Music Awards	2025	Primera Musa	Latin Rhythm Album of the Year	Nominated	
Billboard Latin Music Awards	2026	Himself	New Artist of the Year	Won	
Billboard Latin Music Awards	2026	Himself	Hot Latin Songs Artist of the Year, Male	Nominated	
Billboard Latin Music Awards	2026	Himself	Latin Rhythm Artist of the Year, Solo	Nominated	
Billboard Latin Music Awards	2026	Por Si Mañana No Estoy	Top Latin Album of the Year	Nominated	
Billboard Latin Music Awards	2026	Por Si Mañana No Estoy	Latin Rhythm Album of the Year	Won	
Heat Latin Music Awards	2026	Himself	Best New Artist	Pending	
Heat Latin Music Awards	2026	Best Collaboration	"VeLDÁ" (with Bad Bunny)	Pending	
Latin Grammy Awards	2026	"Por Si Mañana No Estoy"	Best Urban Song	Pending	
LOS40 Music Awards	2025	Himself	Best Latin New Act	Nominated	
LOS40 Music Awards	2025	"Comernos" (with Bad Gyal)	Best Latin Urban Song	Nominated	
LOS40 Music Awards	2025	"Veldá" (with Bad Bunny & Dei V)	Best Latin Urban Collaboration	Nominated	
LOS40 Music Awards	2026	"Koko"	Best Latin Urban Song	Pending	
LOS40 Music Awards	2026	Por Si Mañana No Estoy	Best Latin Urban Album	Pending	
LOS40 Music Awards	2026	"De Lejitos (Remix)" (with Jay Wheeler)	Best Latin Urban Collaboration	Pending	
LOS40 Music Awards	2026	"Ojos Brujos" (with Clarent)	Best Latin Music Video	Pending	
Premios Juventud	2024	Himself	The New Generation – Male	Nominated	
Premios Juventud	2025	"Comernos" (with Bad Gyal)	Best Urban Mix	Nominated	
Premios Juventud	2025	"Nubes" (with De La Rose)	Best Urban Alternative Song	Won	
Premios Juventud	2025	"Nota" (with Jay Wheeler)	Best Pop/Rhythmic Song	Nominated	
Premios Juventud	2026	"Si Estas Con Alguien"	Best Urban Alternative Song	Nominated	
Premios Juventud	2026	"Buti Call" (with Kendo Kaponi)	Best Urban Trap Song	Nominated	
Premios Lo Nuestro	2024	Himself	New Male Artist	Nominated	
Premios Lo Nuestro	2026	"Woahh" (with Rvssian, Young Miko & Clarent)	Urban Collaboration of the Year	Nominated	
Premios Tu Música Urbano	2023	Himself	Top New Male Artist	Nominated	
Premios Tu Música Urbano	2025	Himself	Rising Star	Nominated	
Premios Tu Música Urbano	2025	Primera Musa	Male Album of the Year	Nominated	
Premios Tu Música Urbano	2025	"Que Vas Hacer Hoy?" (with De La Rose)	Collaboration of the Year	Won	
Premios Tu Música Urbano	2025	"Eta (Remix)" (with Roa, De La Rose, Luar La L & Yan Block)	Remix of the Year	Nominated	
Premios Tu Música Urbano	2025	"2K16" (with Bryant Myers)	Best Trap Song	Nominated	
Premios Tu Música Urbano	2026	Himself	Male Rising Star	Won	
Premios Tu Música Urbano	2026	"Koko"	Best Afrobeat Song	Nominated	
Premios Tu Música Urbano	2026	Por Si Mañana No Estoy	Male Album of the Year	Nominated	
Rolling Stone en Español Awards	2026	Himself	Best Urban Music Project	Pending	
