= Att. (album) =

Studio album by Young Miko
- Released: April 5, 2024
- Length: 46:23
- Language: Spanish
- Label: The Wave; Capitol
- Producer: Mauro; Jota Rosa; Caleb Calloway; Brandon Cores; Nova; Oscar Ortíz; Jean Viana; MAG; Guelo Star; DJ Maff; AvilaWTF; Alizzz; Sunny Kale; Garabatto; Albert Hype

Young Miko chronology
Trap Kitty (2022)	Att. (2024)	Do Not Disturb (2025)

Singles from Att.
- 1. "ID" Released: June 2, 2023; 2. "Wiggy" Released: July 21, 2023; 3. "Curita" Released: March 7, 2024; 4. "Princess Peach" Released: April 5, 2024; 5. "Offline" Released: May 7, 2024

Att. (abbreviation of "atentamente"; transl. "sincerely") is the debut studio album by Puerto Rican rapper Young Miko. It was released on April 5, 2024, through The Wave Music Group and Capitol Music Group.

It was produced by Mauro, Jota Rosa, Caleb Calloway, Brandon Cores, Nova, Oscar Ortíz, Jean Viana, MAG, Guelo Star, DJ Maff, AvilaWTF, Alizzz, Sunny Kale, Garabatto and Albert Hype; and featured collaborations with Dei V, Feid, Jowell & Randy, Elena Rose and Villano Antillano.

The album entered the top ten at the Spain Albums chart and the Top Latin Albums chart, peaking at numbers 10 and 9, respectively. It also peaked at number 129 at the Billboard 200 chart.

== Background and release ==
After uploading several songs to SoundCloud, Miko released her first EP in 2022, titled Trap Kitty, later being invited by Puerto Rican rapper Bad Bunny to perform at one of his concerts. The following year she released several singles and collaborations including "Lisa" to moderate commercial success peaking at number 58 in Spain.

She achieved commercial success and international recognition as a featured artist in "Classy 101" with Colombian singer Feid. The song earned her several awards and nominations, and entered the Billboard Hot 100 at number 99, as well as peaking at number 15 at the Hot Latin Songs chart. The song also peaked within the top 10 in various countries including Argentina, Chile, Colombia and Spain. Though 2023 she continued releasing collaborations with artists such as Cazzu, Nicki Nicole, Jowell & Randy (who would appear again in the album), Bad Gyal, Tokischa, and Tainy, among others.

On March 7, 2024, Young Miko released "Curita". That same day, she announced the title of her album, and the single would be the third preview of the album. At the end of March, she announced the release date and track listing.

== Singles ==
"ID" with Puerto Rican duo Jowell & Randy was released as the first single on June 2, 2023. It was followed by the second single "Wiggy" which was released on July 21 and it went viral on social media. "Wiggy" peaked at numbers 24 and 66 in Argentina and Spain, respectively.

The third single "Curita" was released on March 7, 2024. The following month, in conjunction with the album's release, a fourth single titled "Princess Peach" was released on April 5. The following month, on May 7, it was preceded by the fifth single "Offline" with Colombian singer-songwriter Feid and is the second collaboration between both artists, after "Classy 101".

== Track listing ==
Att. track listing
No.	Title	Writer(s)	Producer(s)	Length
1.	"Rookie of the Year"	María Victoria Ramírez de Arellano Cardona; Abner Cordero Boria; Diego López Crespo; Joan Urbinas; Mariana López Crespo	Jota Rosa; Mauro	2:49
2.	"Arcoíris"	Ramírez de Arellano Cardona; D. López Crespo; Urbinas; Brando Caraballo Cores; Héctor López Jimenez; Miguel Montoya	Brandon Cores; Mauro; Caleb Calloway	2:42
3.	"Tamagotchi"	Ramírez de Arellano Cardona; D. López Crespo; Urbinas; B. López Crespo; Montoya; Alan Yael Hernandez	Mauro; Nova	2:56
4.	"Ay Mami" (with Dei V)	Ramírez de Arellano Cardona; D. López Crespo; Urbinas; López Jimenes; David Rivera Juarbe	Caleb Calloway; Slow Jamz; Mauro	3:09
5.	"Fuck TMZ"	Ramírez de Arellano Cardona; D. López Crespo; Urbinas	Mauro	2:28
6.	"Offline" (with Feid)	Ramírez de Arellano Cardona; D. López Crespo; Urbinas; López Jimenes; Salomón Villada Hoyos	Caleb Calloway; Mauro	3:21
7.	"Princess Peach"	Ramírez de Arellano Cardona; D. López Crespo; Urbinas; M. López Crespo; Montoya; Cordero Boria; Alberto Carlos Melendez; Marco Daniel Borrero; Andrea Elena Mangiamarchi	MAG; Albert Hype; Jota Rosa; Mauro	2:46
8.	"ID" (with Jowell & Randy)	Ramírez de Arellano Cardona; D. López Crespo; Urbinas; López Jimenes; M. López Crespo; Montoya; Caleb Calloway; Miguel de Jesus; Randy Ortiz	Mauro; Caleb Calloway	3:55
9.	"En la Pichi Interlude"	Ramírez de Arellano Cardona; D. López Crespo; Urbinas; Cordero Boria; Caraballo Cores	Brandon Cores; Jota Rosa; Mauro	2:19
10.	"Tres Tristes Tragos"	Ramírez de Arellano Cardona; D. López Crespo; López Jimenes; M. López Crespo; Robert Rodríguez Cruz	Caleb Calloway; Mauro	2:35
11.	"No Quiero Pelear" (with Elena Rose)	Ramírez de Arellano Cardona; D. López Crespo; Mangiamarchi; Marvin Hawkins Rodríguez	Mauro; DJ Maff	3:18
12.	"Wiggy"	Ramírez de Arellano Cardona; D. López Crespo; López Jimenes; M. López Crespo; Calloway; Alejandro Avila; Francisco Ruiz Gomez	Mauro; Caleb Calloway; AvilaWTF	2:24
13.	"Madre" (with Villano Antillano)	Ramírez de Arellano Cardona; D. López Crespo; Cristian Quirante Catalán; Javier Falquet Moragues; Rahul Kale; Reinaldo Santiago Pacheco	Mauro; Alizzz; GARABATTO; Sunny Kale	3:01
14.	"Oye Ma'"	Ramírez de Arellano Cardona; D. López Crespo; Urbinas; Cordero Boria; Melendez; Borrero	Albert Hype; Mauro; Jota Rosa; MAG	3:06
15.	"Curita"	Ramírez de Arellano Cardona; D. López Crespo; Urbinas; Cordero Boria	Mauro; Jota Rosa	2:25
16.	"Pinot Grigio"	Ramírez de Arellano Cardona; D. López Crespo; Urbinas; Melendez; Borrero; Cordero Boria	Albert Hype; Mauro; Jota Rosa	3:07
Total length:				46:23

=== Notes ===
- All tracks are stylized in all lowercase, except for "ID" and "Madre", which are stylized in all caps.

== Charts ==
Chart performance for Att.
Chart (2024)	Peak position
Spanish Albums (PROMUSICAE)	10
US Billboard 200	129
US Latin Rhythm Albums (Billboard)	4
US Top Latin Albums (Billboard)	9
