= Lia Kali =

Spanish singer and songwriter (born 1997)

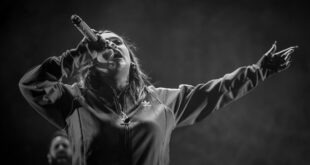

Background information
- Born: Julia Isern i Tomas; July 25, 1997 (age 29); Barcelona, Catalonia, Spain
- Genres: Soul; Latin pop; reggae; rap; jazz; R&B
- Occupations: Singer; songwriter
- Years active: 2013–present
- Labels: Sony Music; Propaganda pel Fet!
- Website: liakali.com

Julia Isern i Tomas (born 25 July 1997), known professionally as Lia Kali, is a Spanish singer and songwriter from Barcelona. She is known for her genre-blending musical style that combines soul, reggae, jazz, R&B, and Latin pop. Lia Kali gained national recognition through her participation in Spanish talent shows and has since become known for her authentic approach to music and openness about mental health challenges.

== Early life and education ==
She grew up in an artistic family environment that nurtured her passion for music from an early age. Her father is a drummer and her mother is a writer, which fostered her creativity from childhood.

At the age of 16, she began exploring Barcelona's music scene by cycling to jam sessions throughout the city, connecting with musicians from the local scene and exploring genres such as reggae, jazz, soul, and rap. Her vocal ability and charisma led her to participate in projects including a tribute to Amy Winehouse called "The Amy's Soul", which helped establish her presence on local stages.

== Career ==
=== Early musical development (2013–2020) ===
Lia Kali's music combines genres such as soul, reggae, and rap, reflecting her diverse musical influences and Barcelona's multicultural music scene.

=== Television appearances and breakthrough (2017–2021) ===
In 2017, Lia Kali auditioned for the Spanish talent show Operación Triunfo, reaching the final phase of the casting process. Although she was not selected for the main competition, this experience marked an important step in her musical development.

In 2021, she participated in the television program La Voz (the Spanish version of The Voice), where her talent attracted the attention of a broader audience and allowed her to gain recognition in the Spanish music industry.

=== "Contra todo pronóstico" and recognition (2023–2024) ===
In 2023, Lia Kali released her debut album Contra todo pronóstico (Against All Odds), a work that addressed personal and emotional experiences through sincere and profound lyrics. The album featured collaborations with producers such as Toni Anzis and Acción Sánchez, and artists including Nanpa Básico and SFDK. The album explored themes of overcoming adversity, mental health, and personal empowerment.

She has collaborated with prominent artists in the Spanish music scene, including Rels B, SFDK, and Argentine rapper Duki, with whom she worked on a song that fused styles and expanded her international reach.

Lia Kali has been invited to prominent Spanish television programs such as El Hormiguero on Antena 3 and La Revuelta on TVE, where she showcased her charisma and discussed her career trajectory, establishing herself as a notable figure both within and outside the musical sphere.

In 2024, she performed at renowned festivals such as Cruïlla and Primavera Sound, consolidating her career as one of the most promising artists of her generation.

=== "Kaelis" and international expansion (2025–present) ===
On 21 March 2025, Lia Kali released her second studio album titled Kaelis, consisting of 17 songs and 36 minutes of music. The album marked her artistic evolution from personal catharsis to what she described as "a gift for the whole world".

Following the album's release, she embarked on a tour across Spain, including performances at iconic venues such as the WiZink Center in Madrid. In May 2025, she collaborated with Puerto Rican singer-songwriter Kany García on the single "Huir" (Flee), a collaboration that expanded her reach in the Latin American market.

In 2025, she received the Antonio Banderas Award for Performing Arts from ESAEM, recognizing her talent and profound artistic connection.

== Personal life ==
Lia Kali has been open about her personal challenges, including her admission to a psychiatric center and mental health struggles, experiences that have influenced her music and strengthened her connection with the public. Her transparency about these experiences has become an integral part of her artistic identity and has resonated with fans.

== Discography ==
=== Studio albums ===
- Contra todo pronóstico (2023)
- Kaelis (2025)

=== Notable collaborations ===
- "El Blues del Condenado" with SFDK (2022)
- "Constelación" with Duki (2024)
- "Huir" with Kany García (2025)

== Awards and recognition ==
Year	Award	Category	Work	Result
2025	Antonio Banderas Award for Performing Arts (ESAEM)	Career Recognition		Won
