= Blackout (Emilia, Tini and Nicki Nicole song) =

2025 single by Emilia, Tini and Nicki Nicole

Single by Emilia, Tini and Nicki Nicole

from the EP Perfectas
- Released: 25 March 2025
- Genre: Electropop; Urban pop
- Length: 3:02
- Label: Sony Latin
- Songwriters: María Emilia Mernes; Martina Stoessel; Nicole Denise Cucco; Andrés Torres; Daniel Ismael Real; Enzo Ezequiel Sauthier; Francisco Zecca; Mauricio Rengifo; Mauro Ezequiel Lombardo
- Producer: Big One

Emilia singles chronology
| "Bunda" (2025) | "Blackout" (2025) | "Motinha 2.0 (Mete Marcha)" (remix) (2025) |

Tini singles chronology
| "Lo Que Me Causa" (2025) | "Blackout" (2025) | "Me Gusta" (2025) |

Nicki Nicole singles chronology
| "Vulnerable" (2025) | "Blackout" (2025) | "Hace Rato" (2025) |

Music video
- "Blackout" on YouTube

"Blackout" (stylized as "blackout 🧊") is a song by Argentine singers Emilia, Tini and Nicki Nicole. It was released on 25 March 2025, through Sony Music Latin, as the second single from Emilia's extended play (EP), Perfectas. The song was written by the three artists along with Andrés Torres, Duki, FMK, Mauricio Rengifo, Zecca, and Big One, and produced by the latter.

== Background ==
On 11 March 2025, Emilia shared a snippet of an upcoming song via TikTok. Over the next few days, all three artists posted photos on their respective social media accounts holding a portable fan, hinting that the song would be a collaboration between the three of them. Emilia announced the song on 21 March via her social media.

== Music video ==
The music video for "Blackout" was directed by Lea Esmaili, which was released alongside the song. The video takes place in a fan warehouse during a heat wave, Emilia, Tini and Nicole seduced customers, causing them to "melt" for them.

== Charts ==
=== Weekly charts ===
Weekly chart performance for "Blackout"
| Chart (2025) | Peak position |
|---|---|
| Latin America (Monitor Latino) | 8 |
| Argentina (Argentina Hot 100) | 1 |
| Argentina (CAPIF) | 1 |
| Argentina (Monitor Latino) | 1 |
| Bolivia (Monitor Latino) | 6 |
| Chile (Monitor Latino) | 1 |
| Ecuador (Monitor Latino) | 1 |
| Nicaragua (Monitor Latino) | 12 |
| Panama (PRODUCE) | 2 |
| Peru (Monitor Latino) | 11 |
| Spain (PROMUSICAE) | 8 |
| Uruguay (Monitor Latino) | 5 |
| US Latin Pop Airplay (Billboard) | 24 |
| World (Billboard Global Excl. US) | 119 |

== Certifications ==
Certifications for "Blackout"
| Region | Certification | Certified units/sales |
|---|---|---|
| Spain (Promusicae) | Platinum | 100,000^{‡} |
| United States (RIAA) | Gold (Latin) | 30,000^{‡} |
^{‡} Sales+streaming figures based on certification alone.
