= Clarent (singer) =

Puerto Rican singer

- Also known as: Babayaga
- Born: Fabián Cartagena Torres; Caparra, Puerto Rico
- Genres: Reggaeton; Latin trap
- Occupations: Singer; songwriter
- Years active: 2023–present
- Label: Warner Music Latina

Alexis Fabián Cartagena Torres, known professionally as Clarent, is a Puerto Rican singer and songwriter Born on December 11, 2003. He is best known for his song "IA", a collaboration with Mora, and his collaborations with artists such as Myke Towers, Omar Courtz, Young Miko, Rauw Alejandro and Bryant Myers among others.

== Early life ==
Torres worked as a barber before pursuing music professionally.

== Career ==
While there have been leaks of his music before, his first release on music platforms was "1A" on June 4, 2023. His early music was influenced by artists like Bryant Myers, Ozuna and Bad Bunny.

He found initial success with "Sport+ RMX", a collaboration with Myke Towers. This marked his first entry on the Spanish charts.

On October 17, 2024, he released "IA" with Mora. The song reached number one in Spain.

On January 8, 2026, he released his debut EP No vuelve a suceder, featuring collaborations with Omar Courtz and Morad.

== Discography ==
=== Albums ===
List of EPs, with chart positions
Title	Year		
Title	Year	US Latin	SPA
No Pasa Nada Hombre	2026	—	—

=== EPs ===
List of EPs, with chart positions
Title	Year	Peak chart positions	
Title	Year	US Latin	SPA
No vuelve a suceder (calentamiento pre álbum)	2026	49	4

=== Charting songs ===
List of songs, with selected chart positions
Title	Year	Peak chart positions		Album
Title	Year	US Latin	SPA	Album
"Sport+ RMX" (with Myke Towers)	2024	—	54	Non-album singles
"IA" (with Mora)	2024	42	1	No Pasa Nada Hombre
"Woahh" (with Young Miko, Rvssian and Omar Courtz)	2025	—	36	Non-album singles
"Lolly" (with Dei V)	2025	—	60	Los Flavorz
"Killa" (with Bryant Myers)	2025	—	23	Millo Gangster Club
"Forni" (with Rauw Alejandro)	2025	47	53	Non-album single
"Scat Pack" (with Omar Courtz)	2025	—	25	No vuelve a suceder (calentamiento pre álbum)
"Love"	2025	—	3	No vuelve a suceder (calentamiento pre álbum)
"Toy" (with JC Reyes)	2025	—	44	Vivir Pa' Quedarse
"Dime Baby"	2026	—	28	
"—" denotes a title that was not released or did not chart in that territory.
