= Bésame (Alejandro Sanz and Shakira song) =

Single by Alejandro Sanz and Shakira

from the album ¿Y Ahora Qué?
- Released: 23 May 2025
- Genre: Flamenco, afrobeat, rumba
- Length: 3:23
- Label: Sony Music Entertainment España
- Songwriters: Shakira; Alejandro Sanz; Andy Clay; Kemzo, Rayito; Héctor Rubén Rivera "Kahno"; Alexander "A.C." Castillo.
- Producers: Andy Clay; Rayito; Héctor Rubén Rivera "Kahno"; Alexander "A.C." Castillo; Ruffsound

Alejandro Sanz singles chronology
"Corazón Partío (remix)" (2025)	"Bésame" (2025)	"El Vino de Tu Boca" (2025)

Shakira singles chronology
"Soltera" (2024)	"Bésame" (2025)	"Zoo" (2025)

Music video
- "Bésame" on YouTube

"Bésame" (transl. "Kiss Me") is a song by Spanish musician Alejandro Sanz and Colombian singer-songwriter Shakira. A flamenco, afrobeat and rumba ballad, it was released on 23 May 2025 as a single from Sanz's second EP ¿Y Ahora Qué?.

== Background and release ==
On 19 May 2025, Alejandro Sanz posted a preview of "Bésame", a collaboration with Shakira, on social media. The song is the third collaboration between Sanz and Shakira, and featured on his second EP ¿Y Ahora Qué?. It was released on 23 May 2025, almost twenty years after their first collaborations "La Tortura" (2005) and "Te Lo Agradezco, Pero No" (2006). Sanz commented that they had been talking about releasing a new song together for a while and would always joke about it. Despite wanting to record together, they could not come up with the right song, before "Bésame".

== Composition ==
"Bésame" is a flamenco, afrobeat and rumba ballad. It features minimal dance rhythms, combining elegance with mainstream appeal. Sanz commented that the genres showcase their different influences: Shakira is "very into afrobeat" and wants to explore that genre, while he considers flamenco "a part of [his] culture, [his] roots."

The lyrics of the song talk about love, conveying themes of emotion, connection, intimacy, and nostalgia. They depict a deeply emotional romantic connection, likening the beloved's beauty to the essence of life and conveying a strong wish to remain with her. Sanz howls at the end of the track, which has drawn comparisons to Shakira's "She Wolf" and "Bzrp Music Sessions, Vol. 53".

== Music video ==
The music video for "Bésame" was spontaneously filmed during rehearsals for the Charlotte date of Shakira's Las Mujeres Ya No Lloran World Tour. The video was released on 30 May 2025 and directed by Jaume de Laiguana. It features Shakira, donning a cap, jacket, and braids, joining Sanz on stage. Together, they hold microphones, as if rehearsing for a show. Sanz kisses Shakira on her cheek in the video, while she kisses his ear in promotional pictures for the song, which sparked rumors of a possible romance between the two. Milenio explained how they have a history of romantic tension between them, ranging from hugs and suggestive looks on stage to flirty comments on Instagram. Sanz's girlfriend Candela Márquez reportedly got jealous and "very angry" from the kiss, triggering her to unfollow Shakira and Sanz on social media.

== Reception ==
Juan Ignacio Herrero from Los 40 commented that the song "has surprised everyone with its spectacular structure and identity, proving that the two performers have a special chemistry when they unite their talents", and described it as a "gigantic ode to love, to the courage to take that step despite the risk of being hurt." Tomás Mier from Rolling Stone noted Shakira's "shining vocals." Me Suena emphasized that the song is made special for merging deep, heartfelt lyrics with a distinctive mix of sounds.

== Charts ==
=== Weekly charts ===
Weekly chart performance for "Bésame"
Chart (2025–2026)	Peak position
Argentina Hot 100 (Billboard)	9
Argentina (Monitor Latino)	1
Bolivia (Monitor Latino)	6
Central America (Monitor Latino)	2
Central America + Caribbean (FONOTICA)	1
Chile (Monitor Latino)	18
Colombia (National-Report)	1
Costa Rica (Monitor Latino)	2
El Salvador (Monitor Latino)	4
Guatemala (Monitor Latino)	4
Latin America (Monitor Latino)	1
Mexico (Monitor Latino)	16
Nicaragua (Monitor Latino)	13
Panama (PRODUCE)	1
Paraguay (Monitor Latino)	1
Spain (PROMUSICAE)	66
Uruguay (Monitor Latino)	6
US Hot Latin Pop Songs (Billboard)	7
US Latin Airplay (Billboard)	7
US Latin Pop Airplay (Billboard)	3
Venezuela Airplay (Record Report)	14

=== Year-end charts ===
Year-end chart performance for "Bésame"
Chart (2025)	Position
Argentina Airplay (Monitor Latino)	12
Bolivia Airplay (Monitor Latino)	29
Central America Airplay (Monitor Latino)	20
Chile Airplay (Monitor Latino)	82

== Certifications ==
Certifications for "Bésame"
Region	Certification	Certified units/sales
Mexico (AMPROFON)	Gold	70,000^{‡}
Spain (Promusicae)	Gold	50,000^{‡}
United States (RIAA)	Gold (Latin)	30,000^{‡}
^{‡} Sales+streaming figures based on certification alone.
