= Veldá =

Song by Bad Bunny, Omar Courtz and Dei V

from the album Debí Tirar Más Fotos
- Language: Spanish
- English title: "Truth"
- Released: January 5, 2025
- Genre: Reggaeton
- Length: 3:55
- Label: Rimas Entertainment
- Songwriters: Benito Antonio Martínez Ocasio; David Gerardo Rivera Juarbe; Joshua Omar Medina Cortés
- Producers: Tainy; Foreign Teck; Frank King; Bassy; KARBeats; The Osakis; Wisin; Chencho Corleone; Maldy

Visualizer
- "Veldá" on YouTube

"Veldá" (stylized as "VeLDÁ"; normative spelling "Verdad"; Spanish for "Truth") is a song by Puerto Rican rappers Bad Bunny, Omar Courtz and Dei V. It was released on January 5, 2025, through Rimas Entertainment, as part of Bad Bunny's sixth solo studio album Debí Tirar Más Fotos.

== Background and release ==
On January 3, 2025, when Bad Bunny revealed the songs from his album Debí Tirar Más Fotos, is where the song "Veldá" was also revealed and included as the sixth track.

== Music and lyrics ==
Musically, "Veldá" It is a reggaeton song that, in brief moments, combines latin pop and trap. Lirically, "Veldá" it is a song that invites you to explore the senses and enjoy the pleasures of life. The lyrics includes, "Vamo' a ver si es verdá'". Additionally, at the end of the song, Wisin speaks and it also contains a sample of "No Voy a Esperar Por Ti" by Plan B.

== Visualizer ==
A visualizer was released on January 5, 2025 along with the other songs and the release of the album Debí Tirar Más Fotos. This recounts the first years of Americanization in Puerto Rico (1898–1936).

== Charts ==
=== Weekly charts ===
Weekly chart performance for "Veldá"
Chart (2025–2026)	Peak position
Argentina Hot 100 (Billboard)	10
Bolivia (Billboard)	8
Canada Hot 100 (Billboard)	75
Central America + Caribbean (BMAT)	7
Chile (Billboard)	4
Colombia (Billboard)	6
Costa Rica (FONOTICA)	3
Costa Rica (Monitor Latino)	18
Ecuador (Billboard)	7
France (SNEP)	99
Global 200 (Billboard)	9
Greece International (IFPI)	18
Honduras (Monitor Latino)	4
Italy (FIMI)	60
Peru (Billboard)	3
Portugal (AFP)	17
Spain (PROMUSICAE)	3
Switzerland (Schweizer Hitparade)	68
US Billboard Hot 100	23
US Hot Latin Rhythm Songs (Billboard)	5
US Hot Latin Songs (Billboard)	5
Uruguay (CUD)	8
UK Indie (Official Charts)	50

=== Monthly charts ===
Monthly chart performance
Chart (2026)	Peak position
Paraguay Airplay (SGP)	17

=== Year-end charts ===
Year-end chart performance for "Veldá"
Chart (2025)	Position
Central America Airplay (Monitor Latino)	55
Global 200 (Billboard)	86
US Hot Latin Songs (Billboard)	13

== Certifications ==
Certifications and sales for "Veldá"
Region	Certification	Certified units/sales
France (SNEP)	Gold	100,000^{‡}
Italy (FIMI)	Gold	100,000^{‡}
Portugal (AFP)	Platinum	10,000^{‡}
Spain (Promusicae)	5× Platinum	500,000^{‡}
^{‡} Sales+streaming figures based on certification alone.
