= Luar la L =

Puerto Rican singer (born May 29th 2000)

Luar La L
- Born: Raúl Armando del Valle Robles; May 29, 2000 (age 26); Carolina, Puerto Rico
- Genres: Reggaeton; Latin trap; Drill
- Occupations: Singer; songwriter
- Years active: 2018–present
- Labels: White Lion Records; Warner Music Latina
- Website: luar-la-l.com

Raúl Armando del Valle Robles (born May 29, 2000), known professionally as Luar La L, is a Puerto Rican singer and songwriter. He is best known for his song "Caile", and his collaborations with artists such as Bad Bunny, Anuel AA, Nicky Jam, Arcángel among others. Robles has been considered a raw and direct voice of the street, with great rhythmic capacity.

== Early life ==
Luar la L was born and raised in Carolina, Puerto Rico. He is the son of Miss Puerto Rico, Brenda Robles, and of former merengue singuer, Raúl Armando Del Valle. He spent most of his childhood with his grandparents, Juan and Rogelia and also studied in Río Grande. In his teens, he moved to Washington, California, US, with his mother, who intended to save money and focus on music. However, her project did not work out, and she returned to Puerto Rico.

== Career ==
Robles began participating in improvised freestyle rap battles alongside Eduardo Cebador, a renowned freestyler from Spain, where he excelled. He promoted his music through social media, gaining a following. Initially focused on rap, he later branched out into reggaeton and trap. His professional career began in 2018 and 2019 with singles such as "Guayoteo," "Comerte," and "El Bote," among others.

In early 2018, already part of the production group Los G4, Luar collaborated on several singles with different artists, such as Jamby el Favo on "Me La Quieren Dejar Pegá". He was then discovered by Elías, founder of White Lion Records, who signed Luar to his label. His first single released on the new label was "Algo Diferente" featuring iZaak.

On December 18 of that same year, he released his first EP, L3tra, which included eight songs such as "Side Bitch," "Caile," and "Figura Pública," among others. This extended play brought the artist national and later international recognition.

At the beginning of 2021, he released his first single of the year, "Giuseppe" in collaboration with producer Sinfónico. Following this, he released "De Respuesta" with Jon Z. Already with significant national recognition, he collaborated with Bad Bunny on the single "100 Millones," which further boosted his career. Later, Alex Gárgolas included him on his single "Las Gárgolas" alongside Darell, Arcángel, and others. In early October of the same year, he also collaborated on Farruko's album on the song "Guerrero." In early November, he collaborated with Nio García on the single "Parao."

On November 19 of the same year, he released his second EP titled Subiendo de Precio alongside Rokero, which featured 6 singles and collaborations with artists such as Ñengo Flow. A few days later, he collaborated on Eladio Carrión's album SauceBoyz II with the single "Socio."

In January 2022, he also collaborated with Brytiago and Ankhal on the single "Sicaria." In May of that year, he released L3TRA Platinum Reloaded, which consisted of eight remixes of the hit songs from his first album. This project featured collaborations with artists such as De La Ghetto, Tito el Bambino, Eladio Carrión, Jon Z, Jowell, Brytiago, Darell, among others.

On December 18, 2022, he released his second studio album, titled L3TRA 2, a sequel to his first album, which included 12 solo tracks.

In August 2023, he gave a sold-out concert at the Coca-Cola Music Hall, where he performed 39 songs and featured guest artists such as Eladio Carrión, Yovngchimi, Jay Wheeler, De la Ghetto, and others.

On October 13, 2023, his collaboration with Bad Bunny, "TELEFONO NUEVO", was released on Bad Bunny's fifth studio album, nadie sabe lo que va a pasar mañana. This song marked his first entry on the Billboard Hot 100, charting at #32.

On December 18, 2025, he released his third studio album, SOBR3NATURAL, featuring collaborations with artists like Dei V, Blessd, Juhn, Anuel AA and others.

== Controversies ==
In May 2023, Robles was arrested in San Juan for possession of drugs and illegal weapons.

== Discography ==
=== Albums ===
- 2020: L3tra
- 2022: L3tra 2
- 2025: Sobr3natural

=== Extended plays ===
- 2021: Subiendo de Precio (with Rokero)
- 2022: L3tra Platinum Reloaded

=== Other charting singles ===
Title	Peak chart positions		Album
Title	US	US Latin	Album
100 Millones (with Bad Bunny)	— (Note: "100 Millones" did not enter the Billboard Hot 100, but peaked at number 13 on the Bubbling Under Hot 100 Singles chart.)	8	Non-album single
TELEFONO NUEVO (with Bad Bunny)	32	9	Nadie Sabe Lo Que Va a Pasar Mañana
VVS Switch (Remix) (with Pressure 9X19, Hades66, YOVNGCHIMI, CDobleta, Anuel AA)	— (Note: "VVS Switch" did not enter the Billboard Hot 100, but peaked at number 8 on the Bubbling Under Hot 100 Singles chart.)	15	Non-album single
No Te Quieren Conmigo (with Lunay and Gaby Music)	—	36	Non-album single
Toki (with Casper Magico, Anuel AA, iZaak)	—	37	Los Magicos
ETA - RMX (with ROA, De La Rose, Omar Courtz, Yan Block)	—	49	Private Suite (Vol. 2)
