= Rels B =

Spanish rapper (born 1993)

- Also known as: Rels Beats; Skinny Flakk
- Born: Daniel Heredia Vidal; 18 October 1993 (age 32); Palma de Mallorca, Spain
- Genres: Latin R&B; dancehall; Latin pop; Latin hip hop; reggaeton
- Occupations: Singer; rapper; record producer
- Years active: 2014–present
- Labels: ILoveRibs!; MÉCÈN
- Partner: Nicole Betancur (2024-present)

Daniel Heredia Vidal (born 18 October 1993), known professionally as Rels B, is a Spanish rapper, songwriter and record producer. He is considered one of the great rising stars of the Spanish urbano music.

His breakthrough single "A mí" received a significant popularity in Spain. On streaming platforms the song became his most listened track. During his career, Rels B had commercial success multiple times with songs like "¿Cómo dormiste?", "Mi luz" and "Mi amor" with singer Aitana, all of them reaching the top 10 in Spain.

== Early life ==
Born in Palma de Mallorca, the largest city of the Balearic Islands in Spain, Rels B left home to work as a waiter and bricklayer at the age of 15.

== Career ==
Rels B began his musical career at a young age, but initially dedicated solely to being a producer, although he recorded a couple of songs during that time. After working for several years as a producer, in addition to releasing some singles, he made his official debut with his first EP Change or Die, in 2014.

In 2015 he released his second EP Player Hater, which is consist of 8 songs produced by Itchy & Buco Sounds, mixed and mastered by Quiroga. Other songs such as 'Don't Tell My Mama', 'Word Up', 'Big Plan $', 'Hood Girl' and 'Palm Tree' achieved massive success on networks and millions of views on YouTube. During the same time, the music video for 'Mary Jane', with which he gained wide public acceptance, was produced by Itchy & Buco Sounds and Nibiru Films.

In 2016, he premiered the music videos for 'Skinny Flakkkkkkk' and 'Tienes El Don' on YouTube, with which he managed to capture the attention of other exponents of the genre. His first album Boys Don't Cry was released in the same year, consisting of a total of 12 tracks, again produced by Itchy & Buco Sounds and mastered by Quiroga.

In 2017 he returned with an audiovisual project consisting of various songs with Indigo Jams, such as 'Nueva generación', 'A solas', 'Lord Forgive Me' and 'I Know'. Then he would launch the song 'Libres' and the music video of 'Rock & Roll', with which he had accumulated more than two million views in less than a month.

In 2019, the Majorcan 'spent his time celebrating' and on his birthday he released the album Happy Birthday Flakko.

At the end of 2020, an album titled La Isla LP was released by Rels B, which has been described as the 'most musical work of his career', consisting of ten songs that deal with confinement, heartbreak and his hometown, Palma de Mallorca.

On April 14, 2021, he released his single "Clase G", in which he discusses his contract with Sony Music, which he had just terminated. This single was also the first from his EP as an independent artist, which would be released in 2022. In May of the same year, he also released "Como Antes", and in September, "Shorty que te vaya bn".

== Discography ==
=== Studio albums ===
Album	Details	Peaks	Certifications
Album	Details	SPA	Certifications
Boys Don't Cry	Released: 25 September 2016; Label: ILoveRibs!; Formats: Digital download	52	
Flakk Daniel's LP	Released: 6 April 2018; Label: ILoveRibs!; Formats: Digital download, streaming	1	
Happy Birthday Flakko	Released: 17 October 2019; Label: Sony Music Spain; Formats: Digital download, streaming	66	
La Isla LP	Released: 26 December 2020; Label: Sony Music Spain; Formats: Digital download, streaming	12	PROMUSICAE: Gold
Smile Bix :)	Released: 25 March 2022; Label: Dale Play Records; Formats: Digital download, streaming	6	
AfroLOVA' 23	Released: 21 July 2023; Label: Dale Play Records; Formats: Digital download, streaming	3	
A New Star (1993)	Released: 26 April 2024; Label: Dale Play Records; Formats: Digital download, streaming	2	
afroLOVA' 25	Released: 20 June 2025; Label: Dale Play Records; Formats: Digital download, streaming	6	
Love Love Flakk	Released: 1 May 2026; Label: Dale Play Records; Formats: Digital download, streaming	3	

=== EPs ===
- Change or Die (2014)
- Player Hater (2015)
- Nueva Generación (2017)
- Nostalgia EP (2024)

=== Singles ===
List of songs, with selected chart positions, showing year released and album name
Title	Year	Peak chart positions		Album
Title	Year	SPA	WW	Album
"Money Maker"	2016	—	—	Non-album single
"Re-Member"	2016	—	—	Boys Don't Cry
"Lejos de ti"	2018	—	—	Flakk Daniel's LP
"Euromillón"	2018	—	—	Non-album singles
"A Mí"	2019	52	—	Non-album singles
"¿Cómo Te Va, Querida?"(with Don Patricio)	2019	30	—	Happy Birthday Flakko
"Shorty Que Te Vaya Bn"	2021	38	—	Non-album singles
"Mi Luz"	2022	9	—	Non-album singles
"100 Tracks"	2022	74	—	Smile Bix :)
"Cómo Dormiste?"	2022	8	—	Non-album single
"Un Rodeoooo"	2023	40	—	Afrolova' 23
"Solita y Sueltaaa"	2023	53	—	Non-album singles
"Mi Amor" (with Aitana)	2023	9	—	Non-album singles
"Ni 1 Complejo"	2024	70	—	Non-album singles
"La Vida Sin Ti"	2024	7	—	A New Star (1993)
"Yotuloko" (with Omar Montes)	2024	19	—	Non-album singles
"Balearico"	2024	72	—	Non-album singles
"Te Regalo"	2024	3	—	Non-album singles
"Corazón Puro" (with RVFY and Morad)	2025	9	—	Non-album singles
"Tu Vas Sin (Fav)"	2025	1	58	Non-album singles
"No me tires flores" (with Alejandro Sanz)	2025	53	—	Non-album singles
"Lleva al Sol"	2026	30	—	Love Love Flakk

=== Other charted and certified songs ===
List of songs, with selected chart positions and certifications, showing year released and album name
Title	Year	Peak chart positions				Certifications	Album
Title	Year	SPA	MEX	US Latin	WW	Certifications	Album
"Buenos Genes" (with Dellafuente)	2018	92	—	—	—	PROMUSICAE: 2× Platinum	Flakk Daniel's LP
"Sin Mirar las Señales"	2019	20	—	—	—	PROMUSICAE: Platinum	Happy Birthday Flakko
"Otro Cheke" (with Duki and The Rudeboyz)	2019	41	—	—	—		Happy Birthday Flakko
"Si No Te Veo"	2019	63	—	—	—	PROMUSICAE: Gold	Happy Birthday Flakko
"Quédate, Te Quiero"	2019	92	—	—	—		Happy Birthday Flakko
"1 de Enero, Puntacana"	2024	58	—	—	—		A New Star (1993)
"Caída del Cielo <3"	2024	35	—	—	—		A New Star (1993)
"Detrás del DJ"	2024	38	—	—	—		A New Star (1993)
"Rapeadita Love"	2024	56	—	—	—		A New Star (1993)
"Como un Velero (Interludio)"	2024	86	—	—	—		A New Star (1993)
"Pretty Girl" (with Tempoe)	2024	51	—	—	—		A New Star (1993)
"Un Desperdicio" (with Junior H)	2024	22	8	49	134	AMPROFON: Gold	A New Star (1993)
"Foro Sol"	2024	93	—	—	—		A New Star (1993)
"Se Apaga // Me Apago"	2024	77	—	—	—		A New Star (1993)
"Ocean Piano"	2024	74	—	—	—		A New Star (1993)
"El Último del Contracto"	2024	80	—	—	—		A New Star (1993)
"A New Star (2024)"	2024	29	—	—	—	PROMUSICAE: Gold	A New Star (1993)
"1000 Millones"	2024	42	—	—	—		Nostalgia EP
"El Mundo x Ti"	2026	41	—	—	—		Love Love Flakk
"Aprendi a Decir No"	2026	44	—	—	—		Love Love Flakk
"Quien Te Ve"	2026	47	—	—	—		Love Love Flakk
"El Cielo" (with kali Uchis)	2026	54	—	—	—		Love Love Flakk
"Sueno"	2026	60	—	—	—		Love Love Flakk
"Mas Que Tu"	2026	61	—	—	—		Love Love Flakk
"Un Placer Conocerte" (with Dj Swet)	2026	68	—	—	—		Love Love Flakk
"Panuelito de Seda"	2026	76	—	—	—		Love Love Flakk
"A 2000 Pies"	2026	81	—	—	—		Love Love Flakk
