= De La Rose (singer) =

Puerto Rican singer

- Born: Yuberkis Gabriela Marie de la Rosa Bryan; September 18, 2001 (age 24); Cayey, Puerto Rico
- Genres: Latin trap; Latin R&B; reggaeton
- Occupations: Singer; songwriter
- Years active: 2019–present

Yuberkis Gabriela Marie de la Rosa Bryan (born September 18, 2001), professionally known as De La Rose, is a Puerto Rican singer and songwriter. She has worked with several well-known artists in the Latin scene such as Mora, Omar Courtz, Jhayco, Jay Wheeler, Quevedo and Myke Towers among others.

== Early life and career ==
De La Rose was born and raised in Puerto Rico. Her father is Dominican, and her mother is from the U.S. Virgin Islands. De La Rose began her music career in 2019 by covering songs from artists such as Juice WRLD and XXXTentacion. In 2021, she released her first original single, "Harley", inspired by Harley Quinn from the DC Universe. She later joined the record label House of Haze, which helped her collaborate with well-known urban artists such as Mora, Jay Wheeler, iZaak, Luar La L and Omar Courtz.

In 2023, she released "Kyoto" with fellow Puerto Rican artists, Omar Courtz and Haze, which charted in Peru and Spain. In May 2024, she appeared on the remix of J Abdiel & iZaak's song "WYA" with Yan Block and Jay Wheeler, earning her first certifications in Spain and the United States.

Later in 2024, she signed with Warner Music Latina and collaborated again with Omar Courtz on the single "¿ Q U E V A S H A C E R H O Y ?" from his album "PRIMERA MUSA". This song ended up charting on the Hot Latin Songs chart with a peak position of No. 9.

== Discography ==
=== Albums ===
- FX De La Rose (2025)

=== As lead artist ===
List of tracks as lead artist with year of release, peak positions on select charts, certifications and album
Title	Year	Peak position on charts										Certifications	Album
Title	Year	USA Bub.	USA Latin	ARG	BOL	CHI	COL	ECU	ESP	GLO	PER	Certifications	Album
"Harley"	2021	—	—	—	—	—	—	—	—	—	—		
"Purple"	2021	—	—	—	—	—	—	—	—	—	—		
"Maya" (with Sharif Rafael)	2021	—	—	—	—	—	—	—	—	—	—		
"Condado"	2021	—	—	—	—	—	—	—	—	—	—		
"AM a PM" (with Seguí)	2022	—	—	—	—	—	—	—	—	—	—		
"De La Nada" (with Los G4 and Rokero)	2022	—	—	—	—	—	—	—	—	—	—		
"Maya (Remix)" (with Mora and Sharif Rafael)	2022	—	—	—	—	—	—	—	—	—	—		
"Nena Buena" (with Chanell)	2022	—	—	—	—	—	—	—	—	—	—		
"Call Center" (with Smash Hits)	2023	—	—	—	—	—	—	—	—	—	—		YKWGTS
"Kyoto" (with Omar Courtz & Haze)	2023	—	—	76	—	—	—	—	75	—	25	Promusicae: Platinum	
"Bien K" (with Conep & Chen)	2024	—	—	—	—	—	—	—	—	—	—		
"Comen Dos" (with Jory Boy & Los G4)	2024	—	—	—	—	—	—	—	—	—	—		
"WYA REMIX RED" (with J Abdiel, Yan Block, Jay Wheeler & iZaak)	2024	—	—	—	—	—	—	—	30	—	—	Promusicae: Platinum	
"3D" (with Jhayco & Tivi Gunz)	2024	—	—	—	—	—	—	—	—	—	—		Le Clique: Vida Rockstar (X)
"Pidiendo Saoco" (with DIA)	2024	—	—	—	—	—	—	—	—	—	—		ITM: Summer, Vol. 2
"Los Fin de"	2024	—	—	—	—	—	—	—	—	—	—		
"Slow" (with Jovaan, Jay Wheeler & Lyanno)	2024	—	—	—	—	—	—	—	—	—	—		
"Malos Hábitos" (with Joyce Santana)	2024	—	—	—	—	—	—	—	—	—	—		
"¿ Q U E V A S H A C E R H O Y ?" (with Omar Courtz)	2024	20	9	7	4	6	16	9	2	23	3	Promusicae: ×3 Platinum	Primera Musa
"ETA – RMX" (with ROA, Omar Courtz, Yan Block & Luar La L)	2024	—	49	—	—	—	—	—	—	—	—		Private Suite (Vol. 2)
"Cobro"	2024	—	—	—	—	—	—	—	—	—	—		
"Ex Ass" (with iZaak)	2025	—	—	—	—	—	—	—	—	—	—		
"Palgo"	2025	—	—	—	—	—	—	—	—	—	—		
"Ninfo" (with JC Reyes & MC Menor JP)	2025	—	—	—	—	—	—	—	5	—	—	Promusicae: Platinum	Nacer de Nuevo
"Nubes" (with Omar Courtz)	2025	—	39	27	—	—	—	—	9	—	—	Promusicae: Gold	
"Natural (Remix)" (with Little Homie, Huan62 & Kris R.)	2025	—	—	—	—	—	—	—	—	—	—		
"Te Colaboro (Remix)" (with Brray, Feid, Yan Block & NTG)	2025	—	—	—	—	—	—	—	—	—	—		
"Aurora" (with Mora)	2025	—	—	—	—	—	—	—	5	—	—	Promusicae: Platinum	Lo mismo de siempre
"5 Minutos"	2025	—	—	—	—	—	—	—	—	—	—		
«—» indicates that the track did not chart there.

== Awards and nominations ==
Award	Year	Category	Nominated work	Result
Premios Tu Música Urbano	2025	Female Emerging Artist	Herself	Won
Premios Tu Música Urbano	2025	Collaboration of the Year	¿ Q U E V A S H A C E R H O Y ? (with Omar Courtz)	Won
Premios Tu Música Urbano	2025	Remix of the Year	"WYA (Remix Red)"	Nominated
Premios Tu Música Urbano	2025	Remix of the Year	"ETA (RMX)"	Nominated
