= Mora (singer) =

Puerto Rican singer

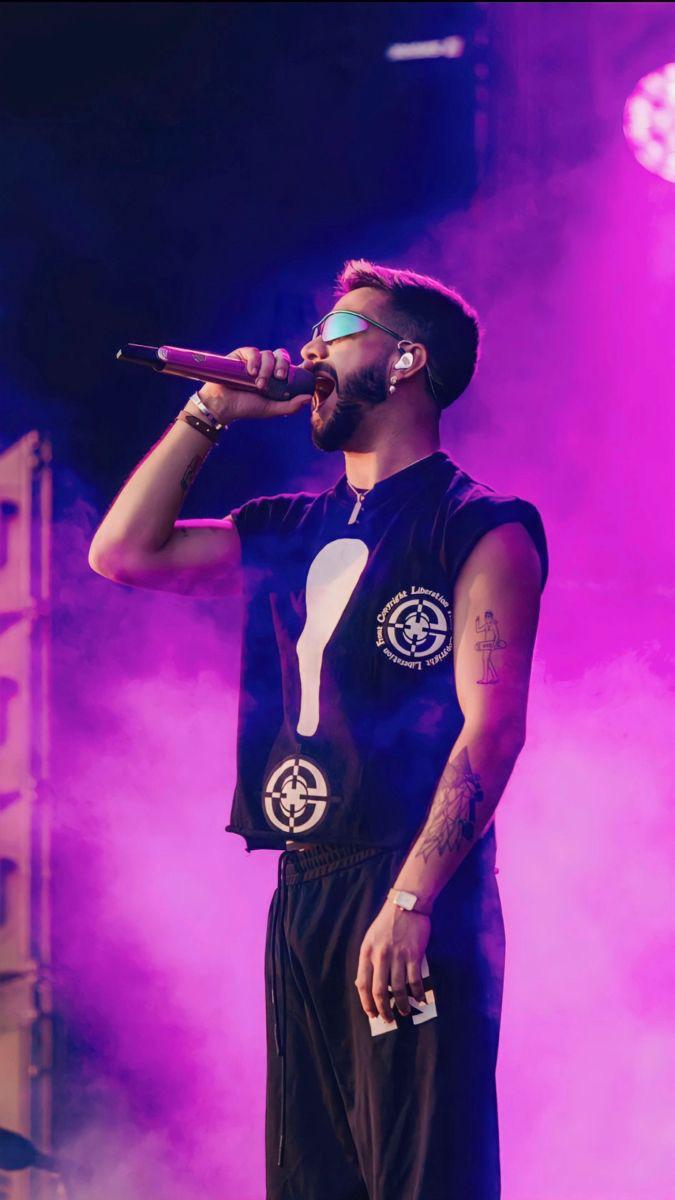
- Mora in 2024.

Background information
- Born: Gabriel Armando Mora Quintero; April 18, 1996 (age 30); San Juan, Puerto Rico
- Genres: Reggaeton; Latin trap
- Occupations: Singer; songwriter
- Instruments: Vocals; piano
- Years active: 2017–present
- Label: Rimas

Gabriel Armando Mora Quintero (born April 18, 1996), better known by his stage name Mora, is a Puerto Rican singer, songwriter, and record producer.

He is known for producing, composing, and collaborating on singles such as "Una Vez" and "Hibiki" with Bad Bunny, "512" with Jhayco, "La Inocente" with Feid, "Volando" (remix) with Bad Bunny and Sech, "Pensabas" with Eladio Carrión, Brray and Joyce Santana, "Memorias" and "Tuyo".

== Biography ==
Originally from Bayamón, Puerto Rico, Mora became interested in music at a young age. At age six, he learned how to play the flute and later learned how to play the piano.

He studied in a Montessori school, where the academic focus was more on the arts than traditional studies. As a teenager, he played basketball and tennis at Colegio San José in Río Piedras, but he did not quit making music.

He was accepted to study Business Administration at the University of Puerto Rico, however he did not complete his degree and left the university after a short amount of time. He also attended the Berklee College of Music, but he dropped out of the university. In 2017, he began his pursuit of a career in music, releasing his first songs.

== Discography ==
Studio albums

- Primer día de clases (2021)
- Microdosis (2022)
- Paraíso (2022)
- Estrella (2023)
- Lo mismo de siempre (2025)

== Awards and nominations ==
=== Grammy Awards ===
Year	Nominee / work	Award	Result	Ref.
2023	Un Verano Sin Ti	Album of the Year	Nominated	

=== Latin Grammy Awards ===
Year	Nominee / work	Award	Result	Ref.
2021	"Dakiti"	Best Urban Song	Nominated	
2022	Un Verano Sin Ti	Album of the Year	Nominated	
2024	"El Cielo"	Best Urban Song	Nominated	
