= List of best-selling singles in Spain =

This is a list of best-selling singles in Spain, some of which have been certified by the Productores de Música de España (PROMUSICAE). All of these singles have multi-platinum certifications.

== Records ==
Ordered by highest-selling to lowest-selling within table sections and by alphabetical order within list sections.

=== Over 1,000,000 units ===
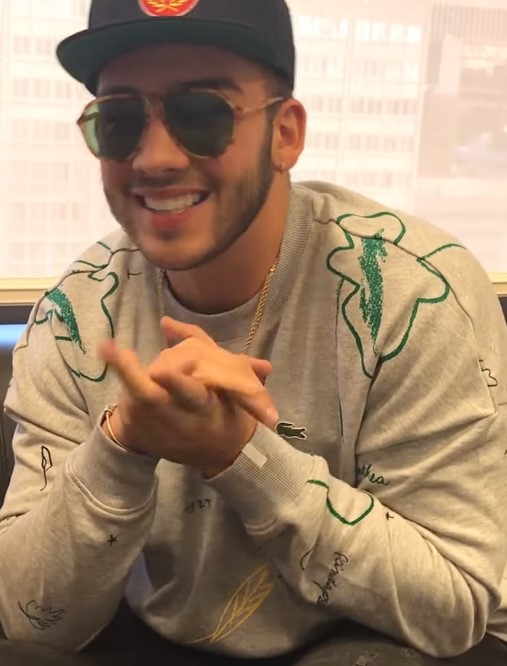
Manuel Turizo has the best-selling single of all time in Spain, his "La Bachata" has over 1 million certified units sold.

Song	Artist(s)/Group	Detailed Sales				Total Sales
Song	Artist(s)/Group	Physical	Downloads	Ringtones	Sales and streaming	Total Sales
"La Bachata"	Manuel Turizo				1,140,000	1,140,000
"Quevedo: Bzrp Music Sessions, Vol. 52"	Bizarrap & Quevedo				1,020,000	1,020,000

=== Over 500,000 units ===
Song	Artist(s)/Group	Detailed Sales				Total Sales
Song	Artist(s)/Group	Physical	Downloads	Ringtones	Sales and streaming	Total Sales
"Despechá"	Rosalía				780,000	780,000
"Todo de Ti"	Rauw Alejandro				720,000	720,000
"El Merengue"	Marshmello and Manuel Turizo				660,000	660,000
"Mon Amour (Remix)"	Zzoilo & Aitana				660,000	660,000
"Columbia"	Quevedo				660,000	660,000
"Si Antes Te Hubiera Conocido"	Karol G				600,000	600,000
"Colgando en tus manos"	Carlos Baute featuring Marta Sánchez		400,000	20,000	180,000	600,000
"Me Rehúso"	Danny Ocean				600,000	600,000
"Tacones Rojos"	Sebastian Yatra				600,000	600,000
"Tú Me Dejaste De Querer"	C. Tangana featuring Niño de Elche and La Húngara				600,000	600,000
"Provenza"	Karol G				540,000	540,000
"TQG"	Karol G and Shakira				540,000	540,000
"Dakiti"	Bad Bunny & Jhayco				540,000	540,000
"Tití Me Preguntó"	Bad Bunny				540,000	540,000
"Tiroteo (Remix)"	Marc Seguí, Rauw Alejandro and Pol Granch				540,000	540,000
"Vagabundo"	Sebastián Yatra, Manuel Turizo & Beéle				540,000	540,000
"Nochentera"	Vicco				540,000	540,000
"Despacito"	Luis Fonsi featuring Daddy Yankee				520,000	520,000
"Las de la Intuición"	Shakira		160,000	300,000	60,000	520,000
"Capaz (merenguetón)"	Alleh & Yorghaki				500,000	500,000

=== Over 400,000 units ===
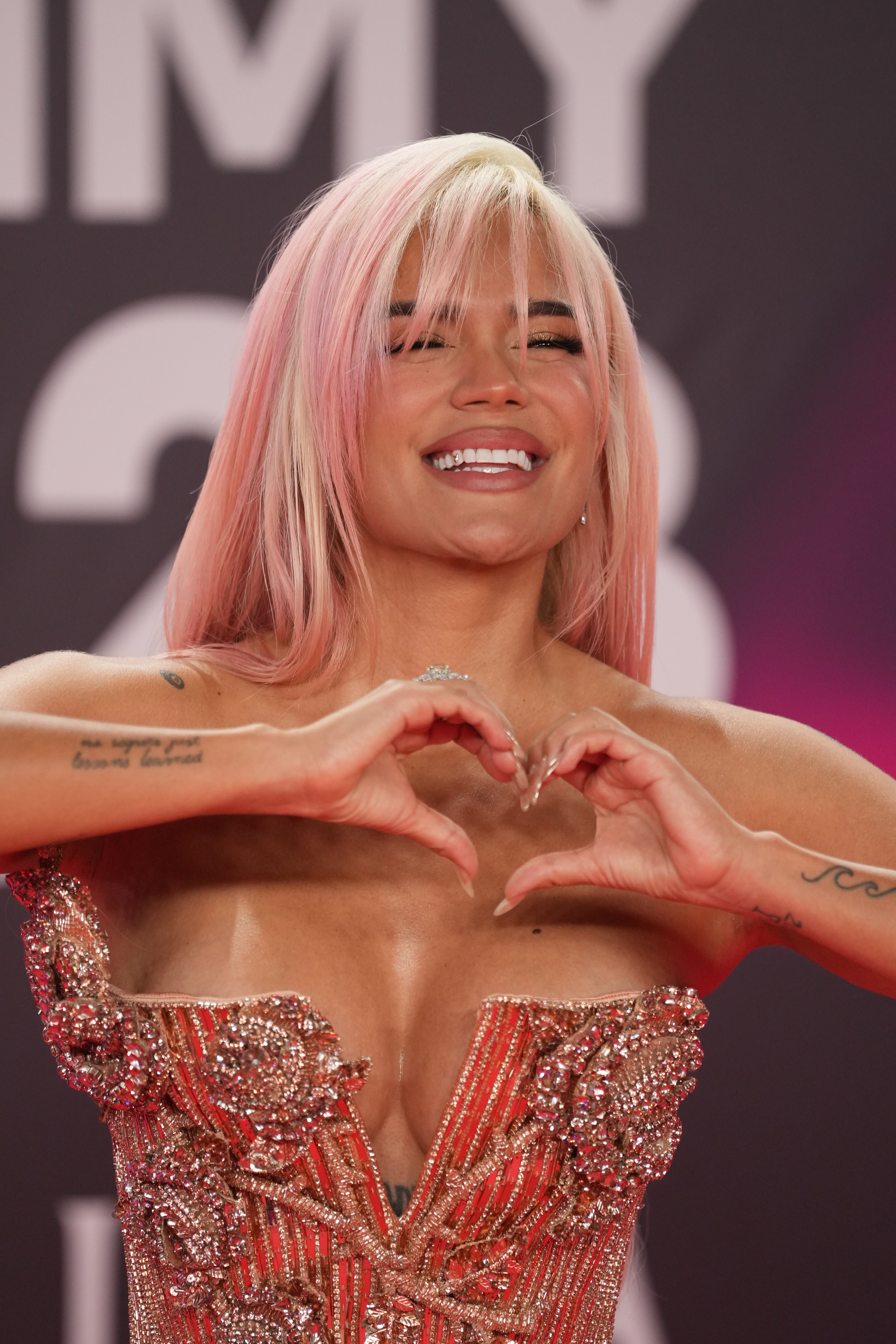
Karol G is the best-selling female artist of all time in Spain, with over 8 million certified units sold.

Song	Artist(s)/Group	Detailed Sales				Total Sales
Song	Artist(s)/Group	Physical	Downloads	Ringtones	Sales and streaming	Total Sales
"China"	Anuel AA, Daddy Yankee, and Karol G featuring Ozuna & J Balvin				480,000	480,000
"Lala"	Myke Towers				480,000	480,000
"Contando Lunares"	Don Patricio & Cruz Cafuné				480,000	480,000
"Mi Luz"	RVFV and Rels B				480,000	480,000
"Playa Del Inglés"	Quevedo & Myke Towers				480,000	480,000
"Perfect"	Ed Sheeran				480,000	480,000
"Pepas"	Farruko				480,000	480,000
"Viva la Vida"	Coldplay				480,000	480,000
"Amor Gitano"	Beyoncé & Alejandro Fernández		160,000	320,000		480,000
"Me Porto Bonito"	Bad Bunny & Chencho Corleone				480,000	480,000
"Ojitos Lindos"	Bad Bunny & Bomba Estéreo				480,000	480,000
"Despacito"	Luis Fonsi & Daddy Yankee featuring Justin Bieber				480,000	480,000
"El Fin del Mundo"	La La Love You feat. Axolotes Mexicanos				480,000	480,000
"Como Camaron"	Estopa				480,000	480,000
"Blinding Lights"	The Weeknd				480,000	480,000
"Pareja del Año"	Sebastián Yatra and Myke Towers				480,000	480,000
"Shape of You"	Ed Sheeran				440,000	440,000
"Qué Hiciste"	Jennifer Lopez		160,000	280,000		440,000
"Beso"	Rosalía & Rauw Alejandro				480,000	480,000
"Mamiii"	Becky G and Karol G				420,000	420,000
"No Me Conoce"	Jhayco				420,000	420,000
"Formentera"	Aitana & Nicki Nicole				420,000	420,000
"Miénteme"	Tini featuring Maria Becerra				420,000	420,000
"Tu Jardín con enanitos"	Melendi				420,000	420,000
"La Curiosidad"	Jay Wheeler, DJ Nelson, & Myke Towers				420,000	420,000
"Yandel 150"	Yandel and Feid				420,000	420,000
"Hey Mor"	Ozuna and Feid				420,000	420,000
"Luna"	Feid & ATL Jacob				420,000	420,000
"Vida de Rico"	Camilo				420,000	420,000
"Vista al Mar"	Quevedo				420,000	420,000
"Sin Señal"	Quevedo & Ovy on the Drums				420,000	420,000
"Punto G"	Quevedo				420,000	420,000
"Las 12"	Ana Mena & Belinda				420,000	420,000
"Shakira: Bzrp Music Sessions, Vol. 53"	Bizarrap & Shakira				420,000	420,000
"Te Felicito"	Shakira and Rauw Alejandro				420,000	420,000
"Callaíta"	Bad Bunny & Tainy				420,000	420,000
"Desesperados"	Rauw Alejandro and Chencho Corleone				420,000	420,000
"El Tonto"	Lola Índigo and Quevedo				420,000	420,000
"Flowers"	Miley Cyrus				420,000	420,000
"Yonaguni"	Bad Bunny				420,000	420,000
"Cúrame"	Rauw Alejandro				420,000	420,000
"Don't Stop the Music"	Rihanna		240,000	120,000	60,000	420,000
"Antes de morirme"	C. Tangana & Rosalía				420,000	420,000
"Another Love"	Tom Odell				420,000	420,000
"Cómo Te Atreves"	Morat				420,000	420,000
"Amanece"	Anuel AA & Haze				420,000	420,000
"Memorias"	Mora & Jhayco				420,000	420,000
"La Inocente"	Mora & Feid				420,000	420,000
"Soldadito marinero "	Fito & Fitipaldis				420,000	420,000
"Hawái"	Maluma				420,000	420,000
"Loco"	Justin Quiles, Chimbala, and Zion & Lennox				420,000	420,000
"Ateo"	C. Tangana & Nathy Peluso				420,000	420,000
"La Historia"	El Taiger & DJ Conds				420,000	420,000
"Calma (Remix)"	Pedro Capó and Farruko				420,000	420,000
"Un Rayo de Sol"	Los Diablos	400,000				400,000
"La Plena (W Sound 05)"	W Sound, Beéle, & Ovy on the Drums				400,000	400,000

=== Over 300,000 units ===
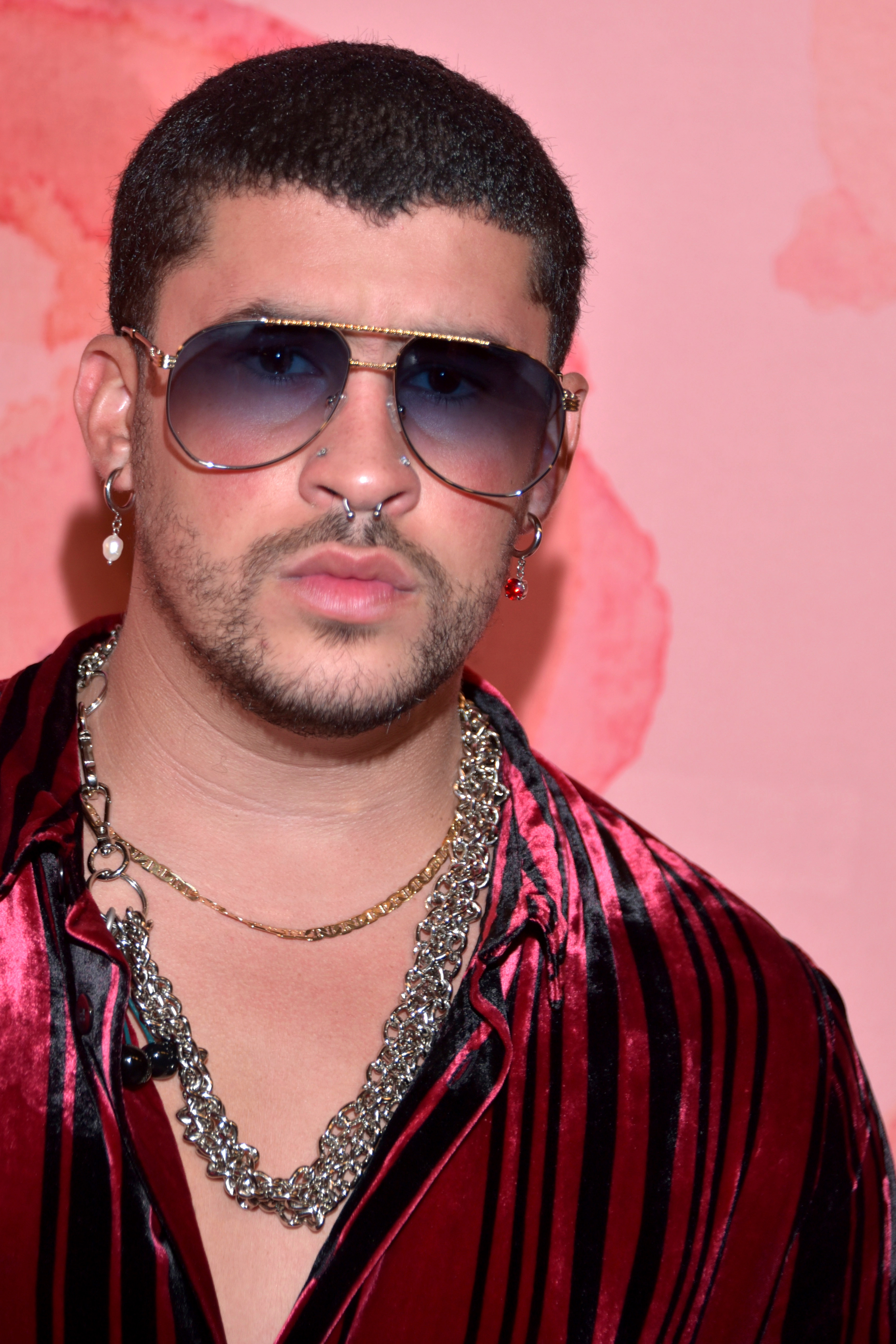
Bad Bunny is the best-selling artist of all time in Spain, with over 22 million certified units sold.

Song	Artist(s)/Group	Detailed Sales				Total Sales
Song	Artist(s)/Group	Physical	Downloads	Ringtones	Sales and streaming	Total Sales
"Umbrella"	Rihanna featuring Jay Z		180,000	200,000		380,000
"Tusa"	Karol G featuring Nicki Minaj				360,000	360,000
"La Canción"	J Balvin & Bad Bunny				360,000	360,000
"Cayó La Noche Remix"	La Pantera, Quevedo, Juesph, Abhir, Bejo, Cruz Cafuné, El Ima				360,000	360,000
"Someone You Loved"	Lewis Capaldi				360,000	360,000
"Adán y Eva"	Paulo Londra				360,000	360,000
"La Noche de Anoche"	Bad Bunny & Rosalía				360,000	360,000
"Caminando por la vida"	Melendi				360,000	360,000
"Lo Siento"	Beret				360,000	360,000
"La Gozadera"	Gente de Zona featuring Marc Anthony				360,000	360,000
"Volando Remix"	Mora, Bad Bunny & Sech				360,000	360,000
"Tarot"	Bad Bunny & Jhayco				360,000	360,000
"Qué Más Pues?"	J Balvin featuring Maria Becerra				360,000	360,000
"Supernova"	Saiko				360,000	360,000
"Shallow"	Lady Gaga & Bradley Cooper				360,000	360,000
"Every Breath You Take"	The Police				360,000	360,000
"Baby Hello"	Rauw Alejandro ft Bizarrap				360,000	360,000
"Si No Estás"	Íñigo Quintero				360,000	360,000
"Polaris Remix"	Saiko, Feid, Quevedo & Mora				360,000	360,000
"Classy 101"	Feid & Young Miko				360,000	360,000
"La Falda"	Myke Towers				360,000	360,000
"La Fama"	Rosalía & The Weeknd				360,000	360,000
"Los del Espacio"	Lit Killah, Tiago PZK, María Becerra, Duki, Emilia, Rusherking & Big One and FMK				360,000	360,000
"Tiago PZK: Bzrp Music Sessions, Vol. 48"	Bizarrap & Tiago PZK				360,000	360,000
"Clavaíto"	Chanel & Abraham Mateo				360,000	360,000
"Manos Rotas"	Dellafuente & Morad				360,000	360,000
"Moscow Mule"	Bad Bunny				360,000	360,000
"All of Me"	John Legend				360,000	360,000
"X'Clusivo"	Gonzy				360,000	360,000
"Mariposas"	Sangiovanni & Aitana				360,000	360,000
"Sin Pijama"	Becky G and Natti Natasha				360,000	360,000
"Por la boca vive el pez"	Fito & Fitipaldis				360,000	360,000
"She Don't Give a Fo"	Duki				360,000	360,000
"Vaina Loca"	Ozuna & Manuel Turizo				360,000	360,000
"Princesas"	Pereza				360,000	360,000
"Ingobernble"	C. Tangana, Gipsy Kings, Nicolás Reyes, & Tonino Baliardo				360,000	360,000
"Demasiadas Mujeres"	C. Tangana				360,000	360,000
"La Isla del amor"	Demarco Flamenco & Maki				360,000	360,000
"Flamenco y Bachata"	Daviles de Novelda				360,000	360,000
"Propuesta Indecente"	Romeo Santos				360,000	360,000
"Cold Heart (Pnau remix)"	Elton John & Dua Lipa				360,000	360,000
"La Jumpa"	Arcangel & Bad Bunny				360,000	360,000
"Qlona"	Karol G & Peso Pluma				300,000	300,000
"Amargura"	Karol G				300,000	300,000
"No Se Ve"	Emilia, Ludmilla & Zecca				300,000	300,000
"Fiebre (Prod. King DouDou)"	Bad Gyal				300,000	300,000
"Rosas"	La Oreja de Van Gogh				300,000	300,000
"Normal"	Feid				300,000	300,000
"Todo Contigo"	Álvaro De Luna				300,000	300,000
"Cupido"	Tini				300,000	300,000
"Me Niego"	Reik featuring Ozuna & Wisin				300,000	300,000
"Santa"	Rvssian, Rauw Alejandro & Ayra Starr				300,000	300,000
"Reina"	Mora & Saiko				300,000	300,000
"Where She Goes"	Bad Bunny				300,000	300,000
"Feliz Cumpleaños Ferxxo"	Feid				300,000	300,000
"Perro Negro"	Bad Bunny & Feid				300,000	300,000
"Soltera (remix)"	Bad Bunny, Lunay & Daddy Yankee				300,000	300,000
"Moscow Mule"	Bad Bunny				300,000	300,000
"Hasta Que Dios Diga"	Anuel AA & Bad Bunny				300,000	300,000
"Ley Seca"	Jhayco & Anuel AA				300,000	300,000
"Ella Quiere Beber"	Anuel AA & Romeo Santos				300,000	300,000
"Something Just Like This"	The Chainsmokers & Coldplay				300,000	300,000
"Delilah"	Tom Jones	300,000				300,000
"As It Was"	Harry Styles				300,000	300,000
"Criminal"	Natti Natasha and Ozuna				300,000	300,000
"Waka Waka (This Time for Africa)"	Shakira featuring Freshlyground				300,000	300,000
"One Dance"	Drake				300,000	300,000
"Gata Only"	FloyyMenor, Cris MJ				300,000	300,000
"Don't Start Now"	Dua Lipa				300,000	300,000
"My advice 2 you"	Gang Starr				300,000	300,000
"Oxygène (Part II)"	Jean-Michel Jarre				300,000	300,000
"Thinking Out Loud"	Ed Sheeran				300,000	300,000
"Photograph"	Ed Sheeran				300,000	300,000
"Por que no eres un coche"	Melendi				300,000	300,000
Potra salvaje	Isabel Aaiún				300,000	300,000
"Qué Bonito Es Querer"	Manuel Carrasco				300,000	300,000
"Tu Calorro"	Estopa				300,000	300,000
"Bandido"	Myke Towers & Juhn				300,000	300,000
"Rara Vez"	Taiu & Milo J				300,000	300,000
"Believer"	Imagine Dragons				300,000	300,000
"Let Her Go"	Passenger				300,000	300,000
"Love Yourself"	Justin Bieber				300,000	300,000
"Arena y Sal"	Omar Montes, Saiko & Tunvao				300,000	300,000
"El Amante"	Nicky Jam				300,000	300,000
"Badgyal"	Saiko, JC Reyes, & Dei V				300,000	300,000
"La Niña de la Escuela"	Lola Índigo, Belinda, and Tini				300,000	300,000
"Mala Mujer"	C. Tangana				300,000	300,000
"Mamichula"	Trueno, Nicki Nicole and Bizarrap				300,000	300,000
"Besos En Guerra"	Morat & Juanes				300,000	300,000
"Cuando Nadie Ve"	Morat				300,000	300,000
"Se Preparó"	Ozuna				300,000	300,000
"El Farsante"	Ozuna				300,000	300,000
"Juramento eterno de sal"	Álvaro de Luna				300,000	300,000
"Mentira"	Manu Chao				300,000	300,000
"Mercho"	Lil Cake & Migrantes featuring Nico Valdi				300,000	300,000
"Señorita"	Shawn Mendes and Camila Cabello				300,000	300,000
"Sirenas"	"Taburete"				300,000	300,000
"Strange Boat"	The Waterboys				300,000	300,000
"String Quartet in c ii poco adagio cantabile"	Joseph Haydn				300,000	300,000
"Del Amanecer"	Jose Merce				300,000	300,000
"La Cucaracha"	Pica-Pica				300,000	300,000
"Una Lady Como Tú"	Manuel Turizo				300,000	300,000
"Wanda"	Quevedo				300,000	300,000
"Yo x Ti, Tú x Mí"	Rosalía & Ozuna				300,000	300,000
Omen"	The Prodigy				300,000	300,000
"Bohemian Rhapsody"	Queen				300,000	300,000
"Gas Gas Gas"	Manuel				300,000	300,000
"Tangos De Pepico"	Estrella Morente				300,000	300,000
"La Edad del Cielo"	Jorge Drexler				300,000	300,000
"Mientras No Cueste Trabajo"	Melendi				300,000	300,000
"Oh Carol"	Dúo Dinámico				300,000	300,000
"Por La Calle Abajo"	Los Chunguitos				300,000	300,000
"Dura"	Daddy Yankee				300,000	300,000
"Nunca Estoy"	C. Tangana				300,000	300,000
"La Reina"	Lola Índigo				300,000	300,000
"La Carcacha"	Selena				300,000	300,000
"Bailando por ahí"	Juan Magán & Crossfire				300,000	300,000
"Mi Refe"	Beéle & Ovy on the Drums				300,000	300,000
"DTMF"	Bad Bunny				300,000	300,000

== See also ==
- Productores de Música de España
- List of best-selling albums in Spain
- List of best-selling singles
