= List of number-one singles of 2024 (Spain) =

This lists the singles that reached number one on the Spanish PROMUSICAE sales and airplay charts in 2024. Total sales correspond to the data sent by regular contributors to sales volumes and by digital distributors.

== Chart history ==
Week	Issue date	Top Streaming, Downloads & Physical Sales			Most Airplay		
Week	Issue date	Artist(s)	Song	Ref.	Artist(s)	Song	Ref.
1	December 29	Dellafuente and Morad	"Manos Rotas"		Ana Mena	"Madrid City"	
2	January 5	Dellafuente and Morad	"Manos Rotas"		Ana Mena	"Madrid City"	
3	January 12	Bizarrap and Young Miko	"Young Miko: Bzrp Music Sessions, Vol. 58"		Dua Lipa	"Houdini"	
4	January 19	Bizarrap and Young Miko	"Young Miko: Bzrp Music Sessions, Vol. 58"		Ana Mena	"Madrid City"	
5	January 26	Bizarrap and Young Miko	"Young Miko: Bzrp Music Sessions, Vol. 58"		Ana Mena	"Madrid City"	
6	February 2	Quevedo	"La Última"		Ana Mena	"Madrid City"	
7	February 9	Quevedo	"La Última"		Ana Mena	"Madrid City"	
8	February 16	Feid and ATL Jacob	"Luna"		Dua Lipa	"Houdini"	
9	February 23	JC Reyes and De la Ghetto	"Fardos"		Ana Mena	"Madrid City"	
10	March 1	Gonzy	"X'Clusivo"		Ana Mena	"Madrid City"	
11	March 8	Gonzy	"X'Clusivo"		Ana Mena	"Madrid City"	
12	March 15	Gonzy	"X'Clusivo"		Dani Fernández	"Todo Cambia"	
13	March 22	Gonzy	"X'Clusivo"		Ana Mena	"Madrid City"	
14	March 29	Gonzy	"X'Clusivo"		Feid and ATL Jacob	"Luna"	
15	April 5	Gonzy	"X'Clusivo"		Ana Mena	"Madrid City"	
16	April 12	El Bobe and Omar Montes	"El Conjuntito"		Benson Boone	"Beautiful Things"	
17	April 19	Rvssian, Rauw Alejandro and Ayra Starr	"Santa"		Feid and ATL Jacob	"Luna"	
18	April 26	Rvssian, Rauw Alejandro and Ayra Starr	"Santa"		Benson Boone	"Beautiful Things"	
19	May 3	Saiko, JC Reyes and Dei V	"BadGyal"		Teddy Swims	"Lose Control"	
20	May 10	Saiko, JC Reyes and Dei V	"BadGyal"		Benson Boone	"Beautiful Things"	
21	May 17	Saiko, JC Reyes and Dei V	"BadGyal"		Benson Boone	"Beautiful Things"	
22	May 24	Saiko, JC Reyes and Dei V	"BadGyal"		Myke Towers	"La Falda"	
23	May 31	Saiko, JC Reyes and Dei V	"BadGyal"		Myke Towers	"La Falda"	
24	June 7	Saiko, JC Reyes and Dei V	"BadGyal"		Benson Boone	"Beautiful Things"	
25	June 14	Trueno	"Real Gangsta Love"		Benson Boone	"Beautiful Things"	
26	June 21	Trueno	"Real Gangsta Love"		Benson Boone	"Beautiful Things"	
27	June 28	Karol G	"Si Antes Te Hubiera Conocido"		Teddy Swims	"Lose Control"	
28	July 5	Karol G	"Si Antes Te Hubiera Conocido"		Benson Boone	"Beautiful Things"	
29	July 12	Isabel Aaiún	"Potra salvaje"		Teddy Swims	"Lose Control"	
30	July 19	Karol G	"Si Antes Te Hubiera Conocido"		Teddy Swims	"Lose Control"	
31	July 26	Karol G	"Si Antes Te Hubiera Conocido"		Benson Boone	"Beautiful Things"	
32	August 2	Karol G	"Si Antes Te Hubiera Conocido"		Benson Boone	"Beautiful Things"	
33	August 9	Karol G	"Si Antes Te Hubiera Conocido"		Dani Fernández	"Todo Cambia"	
34	August 16	Karol G	"Si Antes Te Hubiera Conocido"		Karol G	"Si Antes Te Hubiera Conocido"	
35	August 23	Karol G	"Si Antes Te Hubiera Conocido"		Karol G	"Si Antes Te Hubiera Conocido"	
36	August 30	Karol G	"Si Antes Te Hubiera Conocido"		Karol G	"Si Antes Te Hubiera Conocido"	
37	September 6	Karol G	"Si Antes Te Hubiera Conocido"		Karol G	"Si Antes Te Hubiera Conocido"	
38	September 13	Karol G	"Si Antes Te Hubiera Conocido"		Karol G	"Si Antes Te Hubiera Conocido"	
39	September 20	Karol G	"Si Antes Te Hubiera Conocido"		Karol G	"Si Antes Te Hubiera Conocido"	
40	September 27	Karol G	"Si Antes Te Hubiera Conocido"		Karol G	"Si Antes Te Hubiera Conocido"	
41	October 4	Karol G	"Si Antes Te Hubiera Conocido"		Benson Boone	"Beautiful Things"	
42	October 11	Karol G	"Si Antes Te Hubiera Conocido"		Karol G	"Si Antes Te Hubiera Conocido"	
43	October 18	Karol G	"Si Antes Te Hubiera Conocido"		Karol G	"Si Antes Te Hubiera Conocido"	
44	October 25	Myke Towers and Benny Blanco	"Degenere"		Karol G	"Si Antes Te Hubiera Conocido"	
45	November 1	Myke Towers and Benny Blanco	"Degenere"		Coldplay	"Feelslikeimfallinginlove"	
46	November 8	Clarent	"IA"		Karol G	"Si Antes Te Hubiera Conocido"	
47	November 15	Rauw Alejandro and Bad Bunny	"Qué Pasaría..."		Karol G	"Si Antes Te Hubiera Conocido"	
48	November 22	Quevedo and Aitana	"Gran Vía"		Shakira	"Soltera"	
49	November 29	Quevedo and Aitana	"Gran Vía"		Shakira	"Soltera"	
50	December 6	Quevedo and Aitana	"Gran Vía"		Shakira	"Soltera"	
51	December 13	Yorghaki / Alleh	"Capaz (Merengueton)"		Dani Fernández	"Me Has Invitado a Bailar"	
52	December 20	Yorghaki / Alleh	"Capaz (Merengueton)"		Shakira	"Soltera"	
1	December 27	Yorghaki / Alleh	"Capaz (Merengueton)"		Dani Fernández	"Me Has Invitado a Bailar"	
