= Operación Triunfo series 13 =

Spanish reality television music competition

Operación Triunfo
- Series 13
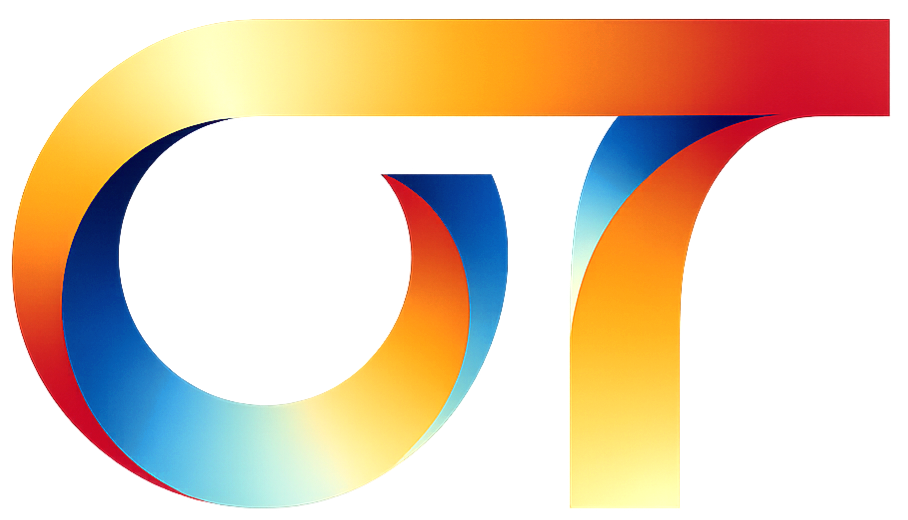
- Hosted by: Chenoa
- Judges: Leire Martínez; Cris Regatero; Guille Milkyway; Abraham Mateo
- Location: Parc Audiovisual de Catalunya, Terrassa, Barcelona

Release
- Original network: Amazon Prime Video
- Original release: 15 September – 15 December 2025

Series chronology
- ← Previous; Series 12

Operación Triunfo is a Spanish reality television music competition to find new singing talent. The thirteenth series, also known as Operación Triunfo 2025, premiered on Amazon Prime Video on 15 September 2025, presented by Chenoa.

In addition to the live Galas on Monday nights, recap shows hosted by series 9 finalist Miriam Rodríguez will air Tuesday to Saturday.

== Contestants ==
The 18 contestants who would appear at the Gala 0 were announced before the show. Of them, 16 would enter the academy and become official contestants.

Contestant	Age	Residence	Episode of elimination	Place finished
Cristina	19	Seville	Gala Final	Winner
Olivia	19	Madrid	Gala Final	Runner-up
Tinho	21	A Coruña	Gala Final	3rd
Guille Toledano	24	Cabanillas del Campo	Gala Final	4th
Claudia Arenas	19	Alicante	Gala Final	5th
Guillo Rist	23	Matadepera	Gala 12	6th
Crespo	21	Lucena	Gala 11	7th
Téyou	28	Santander	Gala 10	8th
Lucía Casani	19	Paterna	Gala 9	9th
María Cruz	24	Las Palmas	Gala 8	10th
Laura Muñoz	20	Pamplona	Gala 7	11th
Max	22	Premià de Mar	Gala 6	12th
Judit	20	Barcelona	Gala 5	13th
Carlos	23	Palma de Mallorca	Gala 4	14th
Salma de Diego	19	Benidorm	Gala 3	15th
Iván Rojo	23	Valladolid	Gala 2	16th
Quique	21	Madrid	Gala 0	Not selected
Sam	29	Las Palmas	Gala 0	Not selected

== Galas ==
=== Results summary ===
Colour key

–	Contestant received the most public votes and became exempt from nomination. (Note: From Gala 11 onwards, the favourite of the audience no longer became exempt from nomination.)
–	Contestant received immunity by the jury.
–	Contestant was up for the elimination but was saved by the Academy's staff.
–	Contestant was up for the elimination but was saved by the contestants.
–	Contestants were up for the elimination and were the nominees of the week.
–	Contestant was up for the elimination and was one of the nominees of the week, but was saved by the jury.
–	Contestant was up for the elimination but was immediately saved by the public votes.
–	Contestant received the fewest public votes and was immediately eliminated.

	Gala 0	Gala 1	Gala 2	Gala 3	Gala 4	Gala 5	Gala 6	Gala 7	Gala 8	Gala 9	Gala 10	Gala 11	Gala 12	Final
Cristina	Immune	Claudia	María	Carlos	Judit	Max	Laura	Nominated	Guille	Claudia	Guille	Mark: 8.75	Finalist	Winner (Final)
Olivia	Saved	Claudia	Max	Max	Crespo	Claudia	Nominated	Tinho	Téyou	Claudia	Guillo	Mark: 9.25	Finalist	Runner-up (Final)
Tinho	Saved	Max	Salma	Max	Lucía	Lucía	Olivia	Saved	Lucía	Claudia	Guille	Mark: 7.75	Finalist	3rd Place (Final)
Guille	Saved	Max	Salma	Max	Lucía	Max	María	Tinho	Nominated	Guillo	Saved	Mark: 7.6	Finalist	4th Place (Final)
Claudia	Immune	Nominated	Max	Max	Crespo	Saved	Olivia	Cristina / Tinho	Téyou	Saved	Guillo	Mark: 8.5	Finalist	5th Place (Final)
Guillo	Saved	Claudia	María	Max	Crespo	Claudia	María	María	Téyou	Nominated	Nominated	Mark: 8.4	Evicted (Gala 12)	
Crespo	Saved	Max	María	Carlos	Saved	Claudia	María	María	Téyou	Guillo	Nominated	Evicted (Gala 11)		
Téyou	Immune	Max	María	Max	Crespo	Claudia	María	María	Saved	Nominated	Evicted (Gala 10)			
Lucía	Immune	Max	Salma	Max	Nominated	Nominated	Laura	Tinho	Nominated	Evicted (Gala 9)				
María	Saved	Iván	Saved	Max	Crespo	Max	Saved	Nominated	Evicted (Gala 8)					
Laura	Saved	Claudia	Salma	Nominated	Judit	Claudia	Nominated	Evicted (Gala 7)						
Max	Immune	Saved	Nominated	Saved	Lucía	Nominated	Evicted (Gala 6)							
Judit	Immune	Claudia	María	Carlos	Nominated	Evicted (Gala 5)								
Carlos	Saved	Max	María	Nominated	Evicted (Gala 4)									
Salma	Saved	Max	Nominated	Evicted (Gala 3)										
Iván	Saved	Nominated	Evicted (Gala 2)											
Quique	Eliminated	Not selected (Gala 0)												
Sam	Eliminated	Not selected (Gala 0)												
Up for elimination	Iván; María; Quique; Sam	Claudia; Iván; Judit; Max	Crespo; María; Max; Salma	Carlos; Laura; Max; Tinho	Crespo; Judit; Lucía; María	Claudia; Cristina; Lucía; Max	Guillo; Laura; María; Olivia	Cristina; Guille; María; Tinho	Guille; Guillo; Lucía; Téyou	Claudia; Guillo; Olivia; Téyou	Claudia; Crespo; Guille; Guillo	Guille; Guillo; Tinho	Winner	Cristina; 46.3% to win (out of 3)
Saved by Academy's staff	María	Judit	Crespo	Tinho	María	Cristina	Guillo	Guille	Guillo	Olivia	Claudia	Guille	Winner	Cristina; 46.3% to win (out of 3)
Saved by contestants	None	Max; 7 of 13 votes to save	María; 6 of 12 votes to save	Max; 8 of 11 votes to save	Crespo; 5 of 10 votes to save	Claudia; 5 of 9 votes to save	María; 4 of 8 votes to save	Tinho; 3* of 7 votes to save	Téyou; 4 of 6 votes to save	Claudia; 3 of 5 votes to save	Guille; 2* of 4 votes to save	None	Finalist	Olivia; 30.1% to win (out of 3)
Saved by public vote	Iván; Most votes to save	Claudia; 84% to save	Max; 58% to save	Laura; 59.3% to save	Lucía; 50.3% to save	Lucía; 69.5% to save	Olivia; 67% to save	Cristina; 84% to save	Guille; 67% to save	Guillo; 52% to save	Guillo; 55% to save	Tinho; 60% to save	Finalist	Olivia; 30.1% to win (out of 3)
Saved by public vote	Iván; Most votes to save	Claudia; 84% to save	Max; 58% to save	Laura; 59.3% to save	Lucía; 50.3% to save	Lucía; 69.5% to save	Olivia; 67% to save	Cristina; 84% to save	Guille; 67% to save	Guillo; 52% to save	Guillo; 55% to save	Tinho; 60% to save	Finalist	Tinho; 23.6% to win (out of 3)
Eliminated	Quique; Fewest votes to save	Iván; 16% to save	Salma; 42% to save	Carlos; 40.7% to save	Judit; 49.7% to save	Max; 30.5% to save	Laura; 33% to save	María; 16% to save	Lucía; 33% to save	Téyou; 48% to save	Crespo; 45% to save	Guillo; 40% to save	Finalist	Guille; 16.5% to win (out of 5)
Eliminated	Sam; Fewest votes to save	Iván; 16% to save	Salma; 42% to save	Carlos; 40.7% to save	Judit; 49.7% to save	Max; 30.5% to save	Laura; 33% to save	María; 16% to save	Lucía; 33% to save	Téyou; 48% to save	Crespo; 45% to save	Guillo; 40% to save	Finalist	Claudia; 13.6% to win (out of 5)

=== Gala 0 (15 September 2025) ===
Contestants' performances on Gala 0
Contestant	Order	Song	Result
Guillo Rist	1	"Shut Up and Dance"	Saved by the jury
Claudia Arenas	2	"Oscar Winning Tears"	Immune by the jury
Crespo	3	"El Merengue"	Saved by the jury
Lucía Casani	4	"Maldita primavera"	Immune by the jury
Sam	5	"Teenage Dream"	Eliminated
Quique	6	"Inevitable"	Eliminated
Cristina	7	"My Baby Just Cares for Me"	Immune by the jury
Judit	8	"California Dreamin'"	Immune by the jury
Iván Rojo	9	"No volveré"	Saved by the public vote
Olivia	10	"Break Free"	Saved by the jury
Guille Toledano	11	"Cuánto me duele"	Saved by the jury
Salma de Diego	12	"Bleeding Love"	Saved by the jury
Max	13	"Careless Whisper"	Immune by the jury
Tinho	14	"Hold the Line"	Saved by the jury
Téyou	15	"Volver"	Immune by the jury
María Cruz	16	"Euphoria"	Saved by the academy's staff
Carlos	17	"Volar"	Saved by the jury
Laura Muñoz	18	"Desátame"	Saved by the jury

=== Gala 1 (22 September 2025) ===
- Group performance: "Yo quiero bailar"

Contestants' performances on Gala 1
Contestant	Order	Song	Result
Claudia Arenas	1	"Carita Triste"	Nominated by the jury; up for elimination
Judit	1	"Carita Triste"	Nominated by the jury; saved by the academy's staff
Salma de Diego	2	"We Don't Talk Anymore"	Saved by the jury
Max	2	"We Don't Talk Anymore"	Nominated by the jury; saved by contestants
Crespo	3	"Mariposas"	Saved by the jury
Guille Toledano	3	"Mariposas"	Saved by the jury
Olivia	4	"I Like the Way You Kiss Me"	Saved by the jury
Iván Rojo	4	"I Like the Way You Kiss Me"	Nominated by the jury; up for elimination
Lucía Casani	5	"La danza de las libélulas"	Saved by the jury
Carlos	5	"La danza de las libélulas"	Saved by the jury
Téyou	6	"Canijo"	Saved by the jury
María Cruz	6	"Canijo"	Saved by the jury
Tinho	7	"Against All Odds (Take a Look at Me Now)"	Saved by the jury
Laura Muñoz	7	"Against All Odds (Take a Look at Me Now)"	Saved by the jury
Guillo Rist	8	"Apt."	Saved by the jury
Cristina	8	"Apt."	Favourite of the audience

=== Gala 2 (29 September 2025) ===
- Group performance: "It's a Sin"

Contestants' performances on Gala 2
Contestant	Order	Song	Result
Up for elimination
Claudia Arenas	1	"El Sitio de Mi Recreo"	Saved by the public vote; saved by the jury
Iván Rojo	2	"It's My Life"	Eliminated
Regular performances
Cristina	3	"Dance Crip"	Saved by the jury
Téyou	3	"Dance Crip"	Saved by the jury
Tinho	4	"La salvación"	Saved by the jury
Guille Toledano	4	"La salvación"	Favourite of the audience
Olivia	5	"If You Could Read My Mind"	Saved by the jury
Salma de Diego	5	"If You Could Read My Mind"	Nominated by the jury; up for elimination
Laura Muñoz	5	"If You Could Read My Mind"	Saved by the jury
Lucía Casani	6	"En cambio no"	Saved by the jury
Judit	6	"En cambio no"	Saved by the jury
Crespo	7	"Clavaíto"	Nominated by the jury; saved by the academy's staff
María Cruz	7	"Clavaíto"	Nominated by the jury; saved by contestants
Guillo Rist	8	"Bye Bye Bye"	Saved by the jury
Carlos	8	"Bye Bye Bye"	Saved by the jury
Max	8	"Bye Bye Bye"	Nominated by the jury; up for elimination

=== Gala 3 (6 October 2025) ===
- Group performance: "Será porque te amo"
- Musical guest: Juanjo Bona ("Últimamente")

Contestants' performances on Gala 3
Contestant	Order	Song	Result
Up for elimination
Salma de Diego	1	"Lo saben mis zapatos"	Eliminated
Max	2	"Tu refugio"	Saved by the public vote; nominated by the jury; saved by contestants
Regular performances
Tinho	3	"El único"	Nominated by the jury; saved by the academy's staff
Crespo	3	"El único"	Saved by the jury
Claudia Arenas	4	"Messy"	Saved by the jury
Olivia	4	"Messy"	Saved by the jury
Guille Toledano	5	"Don't Leave Me This Way"	Saved by the jury
Judit	5	"Don't Leave Me This Way"	Saved by the jury
Laura Muñoz	6	"Noche en vela"	Nominated by the jury; up for elimination
Carlos	6	"Noche en vela"	Nominated by the jury; up for elimination
María Cruz	7	"Training Season"	Saved by the jury
Lucía Casani	7	"Training Season"	Favourite of the audience
Cristina	7	"Training Season"	Saved by the jury
Guillo Rist	8	"Vamos a olvidar"	Saved by the jury
Téyou	8	"Vamos a olvidar"	Saved by the jury

=== Gala 4 (13 October 2025) ===
- Group performance: "Sin miedo"
- Musical guests: Dani Fernández and Valeria Castro ("¿Y si lo hacemos?")

Contestants' performances on Gala 4
Contestant	Order	Song	Result
Up for elimination
Laura Muñoz	1	"I Surrender"	Saved by the public vote; saved by the jury
Carlos	2	"Que te Quería"	Eliminated
Regular performances
Claudia Arenas	3	"Kiss Me More"	Saved by the jury
Téyou	3	"Kiss Me More"	Favourite of the audience
Crespo	4	"Akureyri"	Nominated by the jury; saved by contestants
Olivia	4	"Akureyri"	Saved by the jury
Cristina	5	"Does Your Mother Know"	Saved by the jury
Max	5	"Does Your Mother Know"	Saved by the jury
Lucía Casani	6	"Vete"	Nominated by the jury; up for elimination
María Cruz	6	"Vete"	Nominated by the jury; saved by the academy's staff
Tinho	7	"Die with a Smile"	Saved by the jury
Judit	7	"Die with a Smile"	Nominated by the jury; up for elimination
Guille Toledano	8	"Nuevayol"	Saved by the jury
Guillo Rist	8	"Nuevayol"	Saved by the jury

=== Gala 5 (20 October 2025) ===
- Group performance: "Mi nombre" (with Leire Martínez)
- Musical guests: Mayo and Elettra Lamborghini ("Castigo")

Contestants' performances on Gala 5
Contestant	Order	Song	Result
Up for elimination
Lucía Casani	1	"Creo en mí"	Saved by the public vote; nominated by the jury; up for elimination
Judit	2	"Ciudad de papel"	Eliminated
Regular performances
Guillo Rist	3	"I Wanna Be Your Slave"	Saved by the jury
Tinho	3	"I Wanna Be Your Slave"	Saved by the jury
Crespo	4	"Nada Valgo Sin Tu Amor"	Favourite of the audience
Claudia Arenas	4	"Nada Valgo Sin Tu Amor"	Nominated by the jury; saved by contestants
Olivia	5	"Yes, And?"	Saved by the jury
María Cruz	5	"Yes, And?"	Saved by the jury
Max	6	"I Was Born to Love You"	Nominated by the jury; up for elimination
Guille Toledano	6	"I Was Born to Love You"	Saved by the jury
Cristina	7	"La mala costumbre"	Nominated by the jury; saved by the academy's staff
Laura Muñoz	7	"La mala costumbre"	Saved by the jury
Téyou	8	"Papaoutai"	Saved by the jury

=== Gala 6 (27 October 2025) ===
- Group performance: "Make Your Own Kind of Music"
- Musical guests: Ana Mena and Abraham Mateo ("Quiero decirte")

Contestants' performances on Gala 6
Contestant	Order	Song	Result
Up for elimination
Max	1	"You Will Be Found"	Eliminated
Lucía Casani	2	"Tu falta de querer"	Saved by the public vote; saved by the jury
Regular performances
Crespo	3	"Can't Hold Us"	Saved by the jury
Claudia Arenas	4	"Dos gardenias"	Saved by the jury
Guille Toledano	4	"Dos gardenias"	Saved by the jury
Laura Muñoz	5	"Diamonds"	Nominated by the jury; up for elimination
María Cruz	5	"Diamonds"	Nominated by the jury; saved by contestants
Guillo Rist	6	"El principio de algo"	Nominated by the jury; saved by the academy's staff
Olivia	6	"El principio de algo"	Nominated by the jury; up for elimination
Tinho	7	"Agua"	Favourite of the audience
Téyou	7	"Agua"	Saved by the jury
Cristina	8	"Je me casse"	Saved by the jury

=== Gala 7 (3 November 2025) ===
- Group performance: "Qué bonito es querer"
- Musical guest: Nil Moliner ("Tu cuerpo en Braille")

Contestants' performances on Gala 7
Contestant	Order	Song	Result
Up for elimination
Olivia	1	"Superestrella"	Saved by the public vote; saved by the jury
Laura Muñoz	2	"Greatest Love of All"	Eliminated
Regular performances
Claudia Arenas	3	"End of the World"	Favourite of the audience
Cristina	3	"End of the World"	Nominated by the jury; up for elimination
Tinho	4	"Let's Dance"	Nominated by the jury; saved by contestants
Guille Toledano	5	"Siempre es de noche"	Nominated by the jury; saved by the academy's staff
Lucía Casani	5	"Siempre es de noche"	Saved by the jury
Guillo Rist	6	"Catarata"	Saved by the jury
Crespo	7	"Don't Look Back in Anger"	Saved by the jury
Téyou	7	"Don't Look Back in Anger"	Saved by the jury
María Cruz	8	"La reina"	Nominated by the jury; up for elimination

=== Gala 8 (10 November 2025) ===
- Group performance: "Que nada nos pare (Lo más importante)"
- Musical guest: Violeta ("Cruel final")

Contestants' performances on Gala 8
Contestant	Order	Song	Result
Up for elimination
Cristina	1	"Garganta con arena"	Saved by the public vote; saved by the jury
María Cruz	2	"Envidia"	Eliminated
Regular performances
Olivia	3	"Cheek to Cheek"	Favourite of the audience
Tinho	3	"Cheek to Cheek"	Saved by the jury
Crespo	4	"Me has invitado a bailar"	Saved by the jury
Téyou	5	"Baby, I Love Your Way"	Nominated by the jury; saved by contestants
Guille Toledano	6	"Como Camarón"	Nominated by the jury; up for elimination
Claudia Arenas	7	"Kiss Me"	Saved by the jury
Guillo Rist	8	"Sexo en la playa"	Nominated by the jury; saved by the academy's staff
Lucía Casani	8	"Sexo en la playa"	Nominated by the jury; up for elimination

=== Gala 9 (17 November 2025) ===
- Group performance: "Potra salvaje" (with Isabel Aaiún)
- Musical guest: Ana Mena ("Lárgate")

Contestants' performances on Gala 9
Contestant	Order	Song	Result
Up for elimination
Guille Toledano	1	"Stars"	Saved by the public vote; saved by the jury
Lucía Casani	2	"Fue tan poco tu cariño"	Eliminated
Regular performances
Olivia	3	"Manchild"	Nominated by the jury; saved by the academy's staff
Cristina	3	"Manchild"	Favourite of the audience
Guillo Rist	4	"Peregrino"	Nominated by the jury; up for elimination
Tinho	5	"Beautiful Things"	Saved by the jury
Téyou	6	"Súper Vacío"	Nominated by the jury; up for elimination
Claudia Arenas	7	"Latin Girl"	Nominated by the jury; saved by the contestants
Crespo	8	"Hold My Hand"	Saved by the jury

=== Gala 10 (24 November 2025) ===
- Group performances:
  - "Saturno" (with Pablo Alborán)
  - "Lobo" (Claudia Arenas, Cristina, Olivia & Téyou - with Elena Gadel)
- Musical guest: Pablo Alborán ("Vámonos de aquí")

Contestants' performances on Gala 10
Contestant	Order	Song	Result
Up for elimination
Guillo Rist	1	"Abracadabra"	Saved by the public vote; nominated by the jury; up for elimination
Téyou	2	"Je vole"	Eliminated
Regular performances
Crespo	3	"Cosas que no te dije"	Nominated by the jury; up for elimination
Guille Toledano	4	"Until I Found You"	Nominated by the jury; saved by contestants
Tinho	5	"Tempestades de sal"	Favourite of the audience
Claudia Arenas	6	"Birds of a Feather"	Nominated by the jury; saved by the academy's staff
Olivia	7	"At Last"	Saved by the jury
Cristina	8	"Uh nana"	Saved by the jury

=== Gala 11 (1 December 2025) ===
- Group performance: "Voy a pasármelo bien"

Contestants' performances on Gala 11
Contestant	Order	Song	Result
Up for elimination
Guillo Rist	1	"Wonder"	Saved by the public vote; up for elimination
Crespo	2	"Columbia"	Eliminated
Regular performances
Cristina	3	"Punto de partida"	Saved by the jury; finalist
Tinho	4	"I'm Outta Love"	Up for elimination
Guille Toledano	5	"El roce de tu piel"	Saved by the academy's staff; finalist
Olivia	6	"Where Is My Husband!"	Favorite of the audience; saved by the jury; finalist
Claudia Arenas	7	"Overjoyed"	Saved by the jury; finalist

Detailed Jury Marks
Contestant	G. Milkyway	L. Martínez	C. Regatero	A. Mateo	Total
Claudia Arenas	9	8	8.5	8.5	34
Cristina	8.5	8.5	9	9	35
Guille Toledano	7.5	8	7.5	7.5	30.5
Guillo Rist	8.5	8.5	8.5	8	33.5
Olivia	9.5	9	9.5	9	37
Tinho	7.5	7.5	8	8	31

=== Gala 12 (8 December 2025) ===
- Musical guest: Edurne ("Santa Claus llegó a la ciudad")
- Group performance: "Todo irá bien" (with Chenoa)

Contestants' performances on Gala 12
Up for elimination
Contestant	Order	Song			Result
Guillo Rist	1	"Say My Name"			Eliminated
Tinho	2	"Palabra prohibida"			Saved by the public vote; finalist
Regular performances
Contestant	Order	Solo Song	Order	Duo Song	Result
Claudia Arenas	6	"El cielo"	3	"Yes Sir, I Can Boogie"	Already qualified
Olivia	7	"Tengo un pensamiento"	3	"Yes Sir, I Can Boogie"	Already qualified
Guille Toledano	4	"Tengo Todo Excepto a Ti"	8	"Mariposas"	Already qualified
Cristina	5	"Mamma Knows Best"	8	"Mariposas"	Already qualified; favourite of the audience

=== Gala Final (15 December 2025) ===
- Group performances:
  - "Marta, Sebas, Guille y los demás"
  - "Ese lugar" (all sixteen contestants)

Contestants' performances on Gala Final
Contestant	Order	Final Song	Order	Gala 0 Song	Result
Guille Toledano	1	"Haz lo que quieras conmigo"	N/A (already eliminated)		4th place
Claudia Arenas	2	"Vivir así es morir de amor"	N/A (already eliminated)		5th place
Olivia	3	"It's All Coming Back to Me Now"	7	"Break Free"	Runner-up
Tinho	4	"Lose Control"	8	"Hold the Line"	3rd place
Cristina	5	"La noia"	6	"My Baby Just Cares for Me"	Winner
