= List of number-one songs of 2023 (Panama) =

This is a list of the number-one songs of 2023 in Panama. The charts are published by Monitor Latino, based on airplay across radio stations in Panama using the Radio Tracking Data, LLC in real time, with its chart week running from Monday to Sunday.

In 2023, twelve songs reached number one in Panama, with eight of them being collaborations; a thirteenth single (which was also a collaboration), "Quevedo: Bzrp Music Sessions, Vol. 52" by Bizarrap and Quevedo, began its run at number one in October 2022. In fact, nineteen acts topped the chart as either lead or featured artists, with eleven—Marc Anthony, Anuel AA, Eladio Carrión, Farah, Mora, Saiko, La Factoría, Farruko, Boza, Emilia, and Tini—achieving their first number-one single in Panama.

Bizarrap is the second act after Karol G to replace himself at number one in Panama, as his collaboration with Shakira, "Bzrp Music Sessions, Vol. 53" (which debuted at number one), knocked off his collaboration with Quevedo, "Bzrp Music Sessions, Vol. 52". Maluma became the third act to replace himself at number one, as his collaboration with Anuel AA, "Diablo, Que Chimba" (which debuted at number one and extended Maluma's record as the artist with most number-one debuts in Panama) knocked off his collaboration with Marc Anthony, "La Fórmula".

Maluma is the only act to have more than a number-one song in 2023, with three.

== Chart history ==
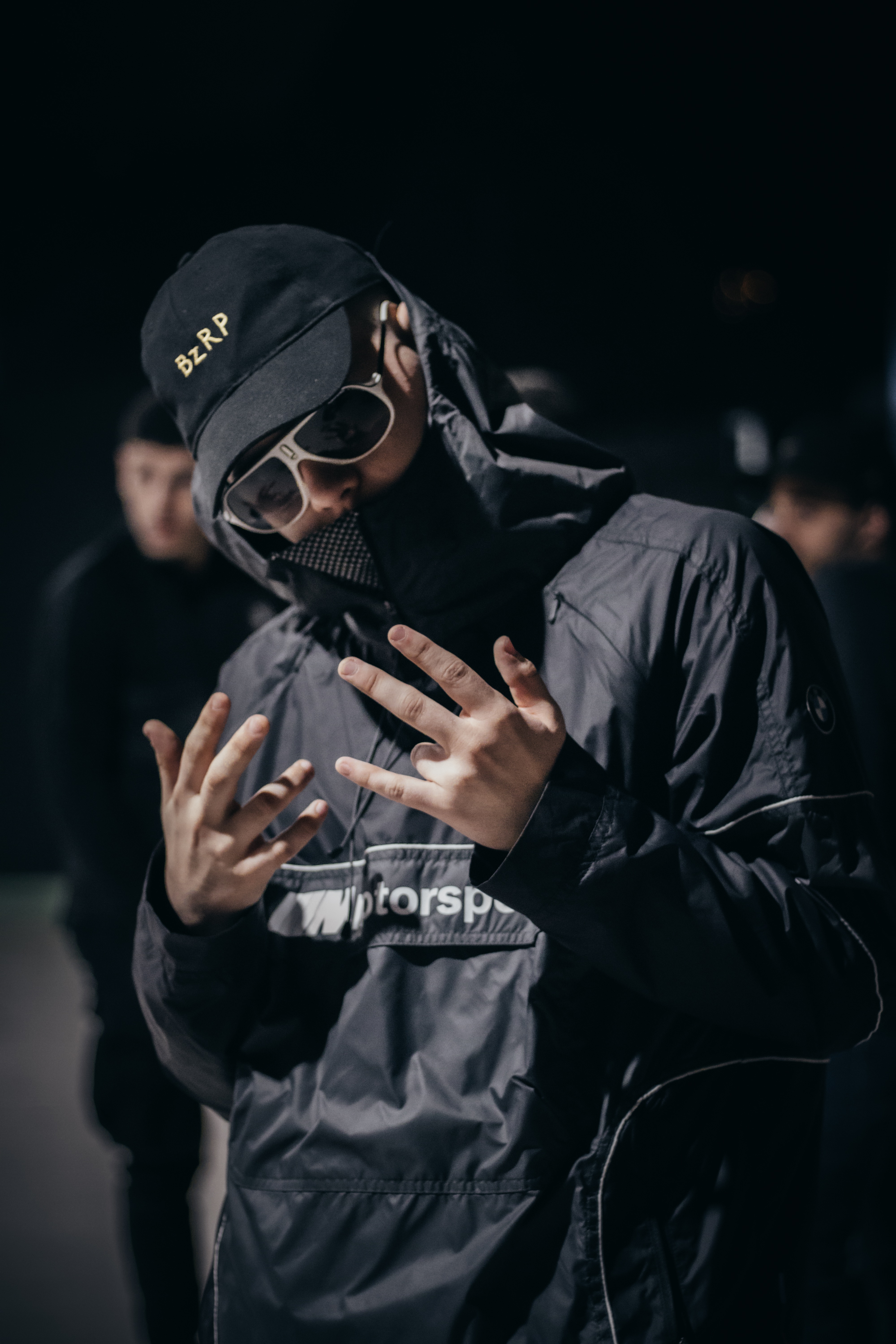
Bizarrap is the second artist to replace himself at number one in Panama.

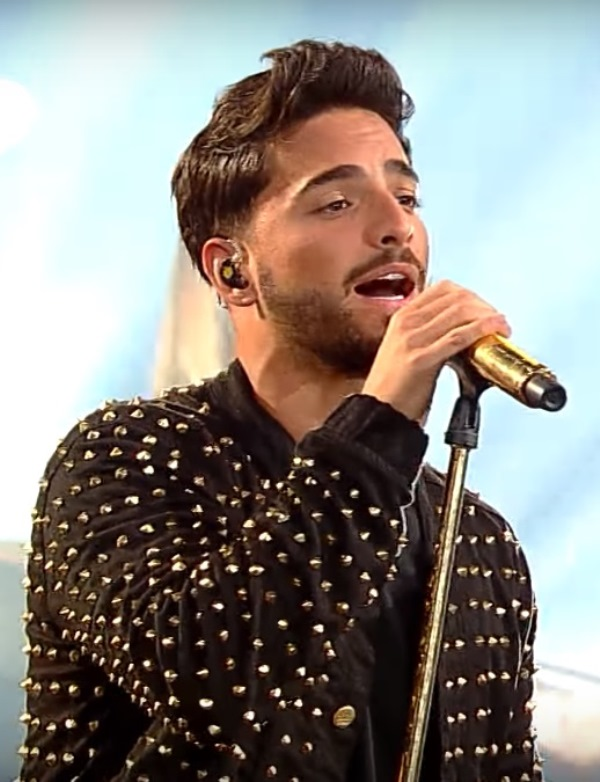
Maluma is the third artist to replace himself at number one in Panama.

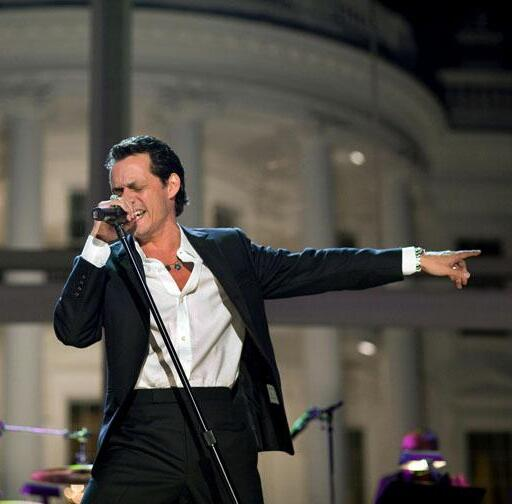
Marc Anthony earned his first number-one single in Panama with "La Fórmula".

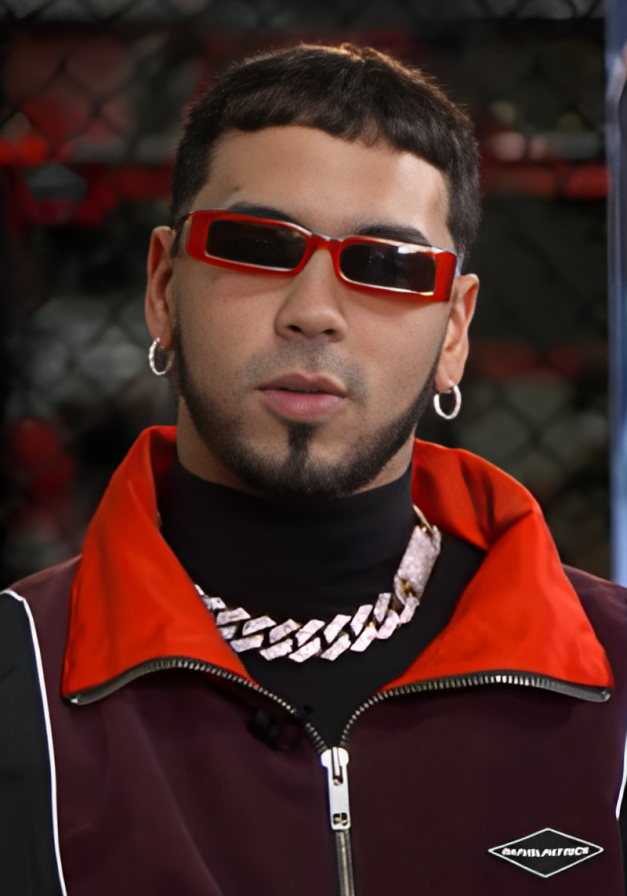
Anuel AA earned his first number-one single in Panama with "Diablo, Qué Chimba".

Key
The #1 song of 2023, "Calm Down" by Rema and Selena Gomez, never reached #1 on the weekly charts.

Issue date	Song	Artist	Reference
2 January	"Quevedo: Bzrp Music Sessions, Vol. 52"	Bizarrap and Quevedo	
9 January	"Shakira: Bzrp Music Sessions, Vol. 53"	Bizarrap and Shakira	
16 January	"Shakira: Bzrp Music Sessions, Vol. 53"	Bizarrap and Shakira	
23 January	"Shakira: Bzrp Music Sessions, Vol. 53"	Bizarrap and Shakira	
30 January	"Shakira: Bzrp Music Sessions, Vol. 53"	Bizarrap and Shakira	
6 February	"Shakira: Bzrp Music Sessions, Vol. 53"	Bizarrap and Shakira	
13 February	"Shakira: Bzrp Music Sessions, Vol. 53"	Bizarrap and Shakira	
20 February	"Shakira: Bzrp Music Sessions, Vol. 53"	Bizarrap and Shakira	
27 February	"La Fórmula"	Maluma and Marc Anthony	
6 March	"La Fórmula"	Maluma and Marc Anthony	
13 March	"La Fórmula"	Maluma and Marc Anthony	
20 March	"La Fórmula"	Maluma and Marc Anthony	
27 March	"La Fórmula"	Maluma and Marc Anthony	
3 April	"La Fórmula"	Maluma and Marc Anthony	
10 April	"Diablo, Qué Chimba"	Maluma and Anuel AA	
17 April	"Diablo, Qué Chimba"	Maluma and Anuel AA	
24 April	"Diablo, Qué Chimba"	Maluma and Anuel AA	
1 May	"Diablo, Qué Chimba"	Maluma and Anuel AA	
8 May	"Diablo, Qué Chimba"	Maluma and Anuel AA	
15 May	"Coco Chanel"	Eladio Carrión and Bad Bunny	
22 May	"Coco Chanel"	Eladio Carrión and Bad Bunny	
29 May	"Coco Chanel"	Eladio Carrión and Bad Bunny	
5 June	"Coco Chanel"	Eladio Carrión and Bad Bunny	
12 June	"Coco Chanel"	Eladio Carrión and Bad Bunny	
19 June	"Coco Chanel"	Eladio Carrión and Bad Bunny	
26 June	"Coco Loco"	Maluma	
3 July	"Coco Loco"	Maluma	
10 July	"Coco Loco"	Maluma	
17 July	"Coco Loco"	Maluma	
24 July	"Coco Loco"	Maluma	
31 July	"Lala"	Myke Towers	
7 August	"Lala"	Myke Towers	
14 August	"Lala"	Myke Towers	
21 August	"Lala"	Myke Towers	
28 August	"Lala"	Myke Towers	
4 September	"Lala"	Myke Towers	
11 September	"Bobo"	Farah	
18 September	"Las Mujeres"	Carlos Vives and Juanes	
25 September	"Las Mujeres"	Carlos Vives and Juanes	
2 October	"Las Mujeres"	Carlos Vives and Juanes	
9 October	"Las Mujeres"	Carlos Vives and Juanes	
16 October	"Reina"	Mora and Saiko	
23 October	"Perdóname"	Eddy Lover, La Factoría and Farruko	
30 October	"Perdóname"	Eddy Lover, La Factoría and Farruko	
6 November	"Perdóname"	Eddy Lover, La Factoría and Farruko	
13 November	"Perdóname"	Eddy Lover, La Factoría and Farruko	
20 November	"Perdóname"	Eddy Lover, La Factoría and Farruko	
27 November	"Perdóname"	Eddy Lover, La Factoría and Farruko	
4 December	"Perdóname"	Eddy Lover, La Factoría and Farruko	
11 December	"Barco de Papel"	Boza	
18 December	"La Original"	Emilia and Tini	
25 December	"La Original"	Emilia and Tini	

== Number-one artists ==
List of number-one artists by total weeks at number one
Position	Artist	Weeks at No. 1
1	Maluma	16
2	Bizarrap	8
3	Eddy Lover	7
3	Farruko	7
3	La Factoría	7
3	Shakira	7
4	Bad Bunny	6
4	Eladio Carrión	6
4	Marc Anthony	6
4	Myke Towers	6
5	Anuel AA	5
6	Carlos Vives	4
6	Juanes	4
7	Emilia	2
7	Tini	2
8	Boza	1
8	Farah	1
8	Mora	1
8	Quevedo	1
8	Saiko	1
