= Donde Quiero Estar =

Donde quiero estar

Studio album by Quevedo
- Released: 20 January 2023
- Recorded: 2021–2022
- Genre: Reggaeton
- Length: 47:34
- Language: Spanish
- Label: Taste the Floor
- Producer: BlueFire; Garabatto; Gio; Kiddo; Linton; Mariku; Ovy on the Drums; Pedro Calderon

Quevedo chronology
Donde quiero estar (2023)	Buenas noches (2024)

Singles from Donde quiero estar
- 1. "Sin Señal" Released: 22 July 2022; 2. "Vista al Mar" Released: 9 September 2022; 3. "Punto G" Released: 4 November 2022; 4. "Playa del Inglés" Released: 15 December 2022

Donde quiero estar (English: Where I Want to Be) is the debut studio album by Spanish rapper Quevedo, released on 20 January 2023 through Taste the Floor. It was preceded by five singles, including the Spanish number one "Playa del Inglés". The album includes collaborations with Myke Towers, Omar Montes, Ovy on the Drums, JC Reyez, and a spoken introduction by Cruz Cafuné. It debuted at number one and spent eight weeks atop the chart in Spain.

== Background ==
Quevedo expressed in a statement that he wanted to convey how he has searched to find where he wants to be, both in "the geographical sense and from the sense of [his] career" on the album. Regarding the title, he stated that he was initially unsure whether to make it a "question or affirmation", but made his mind up that he is clear about "where he wants to be". The song "Yankee" is named after and a tribute to Puerto Rican reggaeton artist Daddy Yankee.

== Critical reception ==
Professional ratings
Review scores
Source	Rating
Mondo Sonoro	7/10

Luis M. Maínez of Mondo Sonoro wrote that the album is "on par with almost any star of the international genre" and complimented how Quevedo made the album without a major label, although acknowledged that "Quevedo's success is the crystallization not only of his own talent, but also of the work and commitment of many others who tamed the horses he now rides".

== Track listing ==
Donde Quiero Estar track listing
No.	Title	Producer(s)	Length
1.	"Intro – Speech Cruzzi" (with Cruz Cafuné)	Linton	1:00
2.	"Ahora Qué"	Linton	2:51
3.	"Yankee"	Gio	3:14
4.	"Vista al Mar"	BlueFire	3:00
5.	"Playa del Inglés" (with Myke Towers)	Ovy on the Drums	3:57
6.	"Sin Señal" (with Ovy on the Drums)	Ovy on the Drums	3:05
7.	"Dame" (with Omar Montes)	Gio; Garabatto	3:51
8.	"Cuéntale"	Kiddo; Garabatto	3:18
9.	"Luces Azules"	Linton	2:40
10.	"Punto G"	BlueFire	2:31
11.	"Muñeca" (with JC Reyes)	Pedro Calderon; Kiddo; Garabatto	3:30
12.	"Wanda"	Ovy on the Drums	2:40
13.	"Me Falta Algo"	Linton; Kiddo; Hugo Bechstein	3:12
14.	"Lisboa"	BlueFire	2:31
15.	"Éramos Dos"	Mariku	2:54
16.	"Donde Quiero Estar"	Kiddo	3:20
Total length:			47:34

== Charts ==
=== Weekly charts ===
Weekly chart performance for Donde Quiero Estar
Chart (2023–2024)	Peak position
Italian Albums (FIMI)	42
Portuguese Albums (AFP)	117
Spanish Albums (PROMUSICAE)	1
Swiss Albums (Schweizer Hitparade)	35
US Heatseekers Albums (Billboard)	4
US Top Latin Albums (Billboard)	12

=== Year-end charts ===
Year-end chart performance for Donde Quiero Estar
Chart (2023)	Position
Spanish Albums (PROMUSICAE)	1

== Certifications ==
Certifications for Donde Quiero Estar
Region	Certification	Certified units/sales
Italy (FIMI)	Gold	25,000^{‡}
Spain (PROMUSICAE)	6× Platinum	240,000^{‡}
^{‡} Sales+streaming figures based on certification alone.
