= Buenas Noches =

Studio album by Quevedo
- Released: 22 November 2024
- Recorded: 2023–2024
- Length: 56:29
- Label: Rimas Entertainment
- Producers: BlueFire; Garabatto; Gio; Kiddo; Zecca; Omar Acaide

Quevedo chronology
Donde quiero estar (2023)	Buenas Noches (2024)	El Baifo (2026)

Singles from Buenas noches
- 1. "Duro" Released: October 31, 2024; 2. "Buenas noches" Released: November 22, 2024

Buenas Noches (Spanish for "Good Night") is the second studio album by Canarian rapper Quevedo. Released on 22 November 2024 through Rimas label, it features collaborations with Rels B, Aitana, Pitbull, Yung Beef, La Pantera, De La Ghetto, Rosé and Sech.

Buenas Noches spawned two singles prior to its release. "Duro" was released as the album's lead single on 31 October 2024. His first release in almost a year following a social media blackout. It reached second place in its second week on the Promusicae charts. On 22 November 2024 its second single "Buenas noches" was released alongside the album.

== Background ==
Quevedo rose to global attention and success when he released his Bizarrap session followed by the release of his studio album Donde quiero estar (2022). Quevedo's first album features "Ahora Qué" in which he stated "2021 sowing, 2022 collecting, 2023 crowning, 2024 disappearing". Prior to Buenas Noches' release he muted the "disappearing" word from the song, leading some to suspect he was going to release an album.

In 2023, Quevedo released stand-alone single "Columbia" whose chorus included the phrase "Buenas Noches" (Good night).

== Track listing ==
Buenas noches track listing
No.	Title	Length
1.	"Kassandra"	3:03
2.	"Duro"	2:42
3.	"Iguales"	3:03
4.	"Gran Vía" (with Aitana)	3:33
5.	"Chapiadora.com"	3:17
6.	"Por Atrás"	2:51
7.	"14 Febreros" (with Sin Nombre)	2:52
8.	"La 125" (with Yung Beef)	3:14
9.	"Halo" (with La Pantera)	3:01
10.	"Mr.Moondial" (with Pitbull)	2:45
11.	"Qué Asco De Todo"	3:10
12.	"Noemú"	3:26
13.	"Shibatto"	2:18
14.	"Los Días withtados" (with Rels B)	2:41
15.	"El Estribillo"	2:41
16.	"Amaneció" (with De la Rose and De la Ghetto)	4:15
17.	"Te Fallé" (with Sech)	3:39
18.	"Buenas Noches"	3:58
Total length:		56:29

== Charts ==
Chart performance for Buenas Noches
Chart (2024)	Peak position
Spanish Albums (Promusicae)	1
Swiss Albums (Schweizer Hitparade)	30

== Certifications ==
Certifications for Buenas Noches
Region	Certification	Certified units/sales
Spain (Promusicae)	4× Platinum	160,000^{‡}
^{‡} Sales+streaming figures based on certification alone.
