= Playa del Inglés (song) =

Single by Quevedo and Myke Towers 2022

Single by Quevedo and Myke Towers

from the album Donde Quiero Estar
- Language: Spanish
- English title: "English Beach"
- Released: December 15, 2022
- Recorded: November 2022
- Genre: Reggaeton
- Length: 3:58
- Songwriter: Myke Towers • Pedro Domínguez Quevedo
- Producer: Ovy on the Drums

Quevedo singles chronology
"Real G" (2022)	"Playa del Inglés" (2022)	"Mi Nena Remix" (2023)

Myke Towers singles chronology
"Ulala" (2022)	"Playa del Inglés" (2022)	"Whiskey y Coco" (2023)

Music video
- "Playa del Inglés" on YouTube

"Playa del Inglés" (Spanish for: English Beach) is a song by the Spanish singer Quevedo and Puerto Rican singer Myke Towers. Released as the fourth and final single from Quevedo's album "Donde Quiero Estar". It is their first collaboration.

== Background and release ==
After releasing his single "Punto G" the singer began recording his next single, inviting Myke Towers.

On 15 December 2022, he released a single with Myke Towers, with title "Playa del Inglés". They achieved No. 1 in some countries for this song.

== Music video ==
The music video was released on December 15, 2022. In the beginning, a van is represented entering a very beautiful area, while within the area near the beach area, Quevedo and Myke Towers dance and sing during the video.

== Charts ==
Weekly chart performance for "Playa del Inglés"
Chart (2022)	Peak position
Spain (PROMUSICAE)	1

== Certifications ==
Certifications for "Playa del Inglés"
Region	Certification	Certified units/sales
Italy (FIMI)	Gold	50,000^{‡}
Mexico (AMPROFON)	Platinum	140,000^{‡}
Spain (Promusicae)	8× Platinum	480,000^{‡}
^{‡} Sales+streaming figures based on certification alone.
