= La Graciosa (song) =

2026 song by Quevedo and Elvis Crespo

Single by Quevedo and Elvis Crespo

from the album El Baifo
- Released: 24 April 2026
- Genre: Merengue pop; tropical
- Length: 4:18
- Label: DQE
- Songwriters: Pedro Domínguez Quevedo; Elvis Crespo Díaz; Isaac Bueno del Pino; Jader Mantilla Cañas; Geovanny Chasiloa Caza; Javier Falquet Moragues; Jaime Rocha Pérez
- Producers: Garabatto; Gio; Pana YMB; BDP Music

Quevedo singles chronology
| "Scandic" (2026) | "La Graciosa" (2026) |

Elvis Crespo singles chronology
| "Abeja Blanca 2.0" (2026) | "La Graciosa" (2026) |

Music video
- "La Graciosa" on YouTube

"La Graciosa" (stylized in all caps) is a song co-written and recorded by Spanish singer Quevedo and American singer Elvis Crespo. The song was released by Quevedo's own label DQE Productions SL on 24 April 2026, as the third single from his third studio album, El Baifo (2026). It is the first collaboration between the two artists and became the album's most successful track. It also debuted at number 1 on the Top 100 Singles Chart in Spain and charted in Italy and Argentina.

== Composition ==
The song features Quevedo collaborating with American singer Elvis Crespo. It is composed of guitars and tropical sounds, and also combines merengue with trumpets and tropical rhythms. At the end of the song, an a cappella performance by Crespo can be heard.

Quevedo explained his decision to collaborate with Crespo: "Elvis is a legend. He’s someone who knows our history; he’s been coming to the islands for years. For me, it’s a dream come true to have recorded with him. We’re from completely different generations, but at the same time, he connects with everyone".

Elvis Crespo explained that the song was sent to him by Sony Music, noting that although he liked it the first time he heard it, he sensed there was a detail that left him puzzled about the meaning of the title "La Graciosa". Crespo then contacted Quevedo, who explained the song’s meaning to him, leading the duo to collaborate.

== Music video ==
The music video for "La Graciosa" was released on the same day as the album El Baifo, coinciding with the album's singles. It was filmed on the island of Graciosa, in Lanzarote, directed by David Pantalón and Zazo Canvas, and produced by Quevedo and The Movement. The two can be seen in various parts of the island: Crespo on the rocky part of the beach with his guitar, and Quevedo in a Jeep with a girl, running with her, getting back in the car, and going for a drive with him. It also includes scenes of Quevedo and Crespo together in the Jeep, dancing on the beach, and in a nightclub with other people. The video garnered 732 million views on YouTube in its first day.

== Commercial performance ==
"La Graciosa" charted in several Spanish charts, debuting at the top. On the week of 20 May, it entered directly at number 1 on the Los 40 Spanish radio station chart. It also reached number 1 on PROMUSICAE's Top 100 Songs chart on 24 May, along with all the songs from the album. It also debuted at number 1 on Spotify's Top 50 Spain chart and accumulated a total of 732,144 streams.

== Charts ==
Chart performance for "La Graciosa"
| Chart (2026) | Peak position |
|---|---|
| Argentina Hot 100 (Billboard) | 22 |
| Italy (FIMI) | 11 |
| Spain (Promusicae) | 1 |
| US Latin Rhythm Airplay (Billboard) | 20 |
| US Tropical Airplay (Billboard) | 17 |

== Certifications ==
Certifications and sales for "La Graciosa"
| Region | Certification | Certified units/sales |
|---|---|---|
| Spain (Promusicae) | 3× Platinum | 300,000^{‡} |
^{‡} Sales+streaming figures based on certification alone.

== Release history ==
Release history for "La Graciosa"
| Region | Date | Format | Label | Ref. |
|---|---|---|---|---|
| Various | 26 April 2026 | Digital download; streaming | DQE Publication | |
| Italy | 24 July 2026 | Radio airplay | DQE Publication | |
