= El Baifo =

Studio album by Quevedo
- Released: 24 April 2026
- Recorded: 2025
- Length: 56:00
- Labels: DQE; Rimas Entertainment
- Producers: Quevedo; Garabatto; Kiddo; Izak BDP; Pana Ymb

Quevedo chronology
Buenas Noches (2024)	El Baifo (2026)

Singles from El Baifo
- 1. "Ni borracho" Released: 13 February 2026; 2. "Scandic" Released: 20 March 2026; 3. "La Graciosa" Released: 24 April 2026

El Baifo is the third studio album by Spanish singer Quevedo. The album was released on 24 April 2026 through DQE and Rimas and produced by Quevedo himself along with his team. It contains 14 songs, including collaborations with other Canarian and international artists.

== Release and promotion ==
On 29 January 2026, Quevedo posted a preview of "Ni borracho", the first single from El Baifo, on his social media. The song was released on 13 February of the same year along with its music video, inspired by Canarian culture and featuring artists such as Arístides Moreno, Lucho RK, and Efecto Pasillo, as well as well-known figures like physicist Javier Santaolalla and comedian Kike Pérez, among others. On 3 March, Quevedo appeared on a float inspired by the "Ni borracho" music video at the Carnival of Las Palmas in Las Palmas.

On March 17, Quevedo released a preview of his second single, "Scandic", a title that refers to the former Scandic nightclub in Gran Canaria. The song was finally released on 20 March. Its music video was filmed in various locations on the island of La Palma, such as Poris de la Candelaria and the Cumbre Vieja area.

On 6 April, an advertising banner was placed in the center of Madrid showing Quevedo holding a young goat, or "baifo" as it is called in the Canary Islands, alongside the different pronunciations of this word. Finally, on 21 April, he announced the album's release date at a drone show held on Las Canteras beach in Las Palmas.

"El Baifo" was released on 24 April and contains collaborations with Canarian bands such as Nueva Línea and Los Gofiones, Puerto Rican artists Elvis Crespo and Tony Tun Tun, and Canarian singers Lucho RK, La Pantera, and Juseph, with whom Quevedo had already collaborated on other occasions.

== Track listing ==
El Baifo track listing
No.	Title	Length
1.	"Está en casa"	2:12
2.	"Caprichoso"	3:07
3.	"El Baifo"	3:19
4.	"Gáldar" (with Tony Tun Tun)	3:03
5.	"Scandic"	3:01
6.	"Al Golpito" (with Nueva Línea)	3:28
7.	"2010ypico"	3:11
8.	"Algo va a pasar" (with La Pantera, Lucho RK and Juseph)	4:08
9.	"Hookah y calor"	3:03
10.	"Flakito"	3:13
11.	"Mi balcón"	4:16
12.	"La Graciosa" (with Elvis Crespo)	4:18
13.	"Ni borracho"	4:08
14.	"Hijo del Volcán" (with Los Gofiones)	5:49
Total length:		56:00

== Charts ==
Chart performance for El Baifo
Chart (2026)	Peak position
Italian Albums (FIMI)	25
Portuguese Albums (AFP)	37
Spanish Albums (Promusicae)	1
Swiss Albums (Schweizer Hitparade)	50

== Certifications ==
Certifications for El Baifo
Region	Certification	Certified units/sales
Spain (Promusicae)	4× Platinum	160,000^{‡}
^{‡} Sales+streaming figures based on certification alone.
