= Cris Lora =

Spanish singer (born 2006)

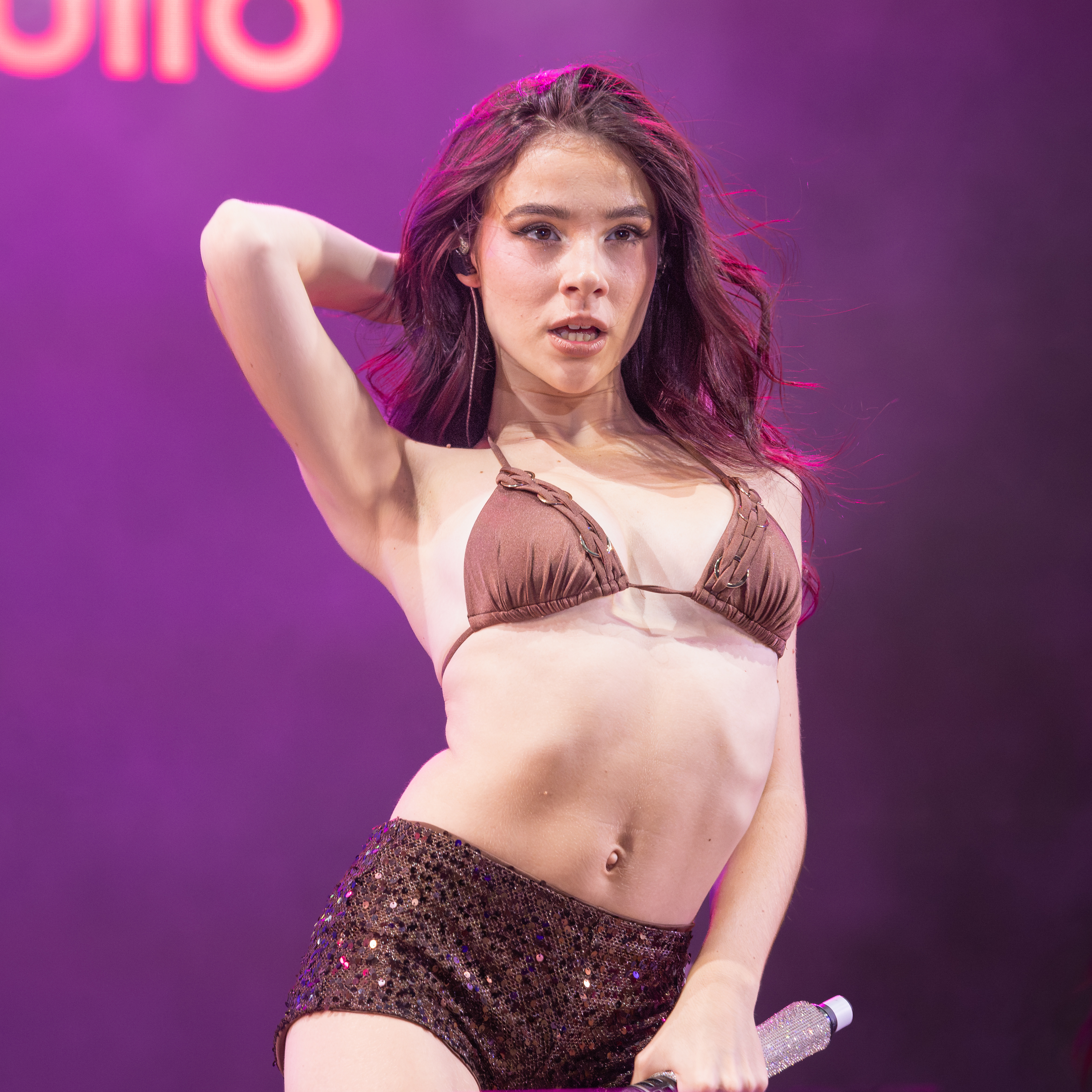
- Lora in 2026

Background information
- Born: Cristina Sánchez Lora; 2 September 2006 (age 20); Mairena del Aljarafe, Seville, Spain
- Education: University of Seville
- Genre: Pop
- Occupations: Singer; actress
- Instruments: Vocals; piano
- Years active: 2014–present
- Label: Sony Music

Cristina Sanchez Lora (born 2 September 2006), known professionally as Cris Lora, is a Spanish singer who rose to prominence after winning the 13th edition of Operación Triunfo in 2025.

== Background ==
Lora was born in Mairena del Aljarafe, Seville in Andalusia. She is studying Journalism and Audiovisual Communication at the University of Seville and has performed as a theater actress in Madrid. She taught herself how to play piano and took tap dancing classes as a child.

== Career ==
2014-2025: Early Career

During her childhood, Lora performed in "Idol Kids" in Spain and on the third season of "Tierra de Talento". She also appeared on "Menuda Noche".

2025-present: Operación Triunfo and musical releases

In 2025, she took part in the 13th edition of the Spanish talent show "Operación Triunfo". She performed songs such as End of the World by Miley Cyrus, APT by Rosé and Je Me Casse by Destiny. She won the contest with 46.3% of the votes following performances of La noia by Angelina Mango and My Baby Just Cares For Me by Nina Simone. Following the contest, Lora signed a contract with Sony Music and began producing her first single, "2 PUÑALAITAS (de Andalucía)" which was released on 27 February 2026 (Andalusia Day). During April, the Operación Triunfo tour began, where she performed across Spain with her peers.

Lora released the collaboration "MELODRAMMATICA" with singer Luk3 on 5 June 2026. She released her second single, "E UN DELIRIO" during a performance. She was also a performer at Mado Madrid 2026. On 10 July 2026 Lora's collaboration with LUCYCALYS, the winner of Benidorm Fest 2026, "¿Tú Piensas?", was released.

== Discography ==
=== Singles ===
- "2 PUÑALAITAS (de Andalucía)" - 2026
- "E UN DELIRIO" - 2026

=== Collaborations ===
- "MELODRAMMATICA" - 2026 - with Luk3
- "¿Tú Piensas?" - 2026 - with LUCYCALYS
- ''MELODRAMMATICA (Spanish Version)" - 2026 - with Luk3

== Filmography ==
=== TV ===
- "Menuda noche" (2014) - guest artist
- "Idol Kids" (2020) - contestant
- "Tierra de Talento" (2021) - contestant
- "Operación Triunfo 2025" (2025) - winner
- "La Revuelta" (2026) - guest

== Tours ==
=== Joint ===
- "2026: OT Tour" - 2026

=== Guest appearance ===
- Violeta Hódar - 2026
- Alfred García - 2026
- Ruslana - 2026
- Guille Toledano - 2026
