= Vista al Mar =

Single by Quevedo (2022)

Single by Quevedo

from the album Donde Quiero Estar
- Language: Spanish
- English title: "Seaview"
- Released: September 9, 2022
- Recorded: August 2022
- Genre: Reggaeton
- Length: 3:02
- Composer: David Hernández García • Pedro Luis Domínguez Quevedo

Quevedo singles chronology
"Sin Señal" (2022)	"Vista al Mar" (2022)	"Punto G" (2022)

Music video
- "Vista al Mar" on YouTube

"Vista al Mar" (Spanish for: "Seaview") is a song by the Spanish singer Quevedo. Released as the second single from his album "Donde Quiero Estar".

== Background and release ==
After the release of his single with Ovy on the Drums "Sin Señal", he began recording his next single and solo.

At the beginning of September 2022, he announced on his social networks that he would soon release a song like the smell of "summer love" that is titled "Vista Al Mar". The song was released on September 9 of that same year.

== Music video ==
The music video was released on 9 September 2022. The video begins on a night of shooting stars while a person is lying down looking at his phone on a mountain, while Quevedo sings in a pipe-shaped area but with a lot of water and looking at the sea during the video.

== Certifications ==
Certifications for "Vista al Mar"
Region	Certification	Certified units/sales
Spain (PROMUSICAE)	7× Platinum	420,000^{‡}
^{‡} Sales+streaming figures based on certification alone.
