= Sin Señal =

Single by Quevedo and Ovy on the Drums

from the album Donde Quiero Estar
- Language: Spanish
- English title: "No Signal"
- Released: 22 July 2022
- Genre: Reggaeton
- Length: 3:06
- Composers: Daniel Echavarria Oviedo; Stanley Jackson Simeon; Pedro Luis Domínguez Quevedo; Roger Alexander Saams Wilson
- Producer: Ovy on the Drums

Quevedo singles chronology
"Quevedo: Bzrp Music Sessions, Vol. 52" (2022)	"Sin Señal" (2022)	"Vista al Mar" (2022)

Ovy on the Drums singles chronology
"Borracha" (2022)	"Sin Señal" (2022)	"Cairo" (2022)

Music video
- "Sin Señal" on YouTube

"Sin Señal" (Spanish for "No Signal") is a song by the Spanish singer Quevedo and singer-songwriter Ovy on the Drums. It is their first collaboration and was released as the first single from Quevedo's first album Donde Quiero Estar.

== Background and release ==
A week after Quevedo released "Bzrp Music Sessions #52" with Bizarrap, which was a success, he announced on his social networks "Sin Señal" with producer Ovy on the Drums. The song was released on 22 July 2022.

== Music video ==
The music video was released on 22 July 2022.

== Charts ==
Chart performance for "Sin Señal"
Chart (2022)	Peak position
Argentina Hot 100 (Billboard)	98
Spain (PROMUSICAE)	4

== Certifications ==
Certifications for "Sin Señal"
Region	Certification	Certified units/sales
Spain (PROMUSICAE)	7× Platinum	420,000^{‡}
^{‡} Sales+streaming figures based on certification alone.
