= Quevedo (singer) =

Spanish singer (born 2001)

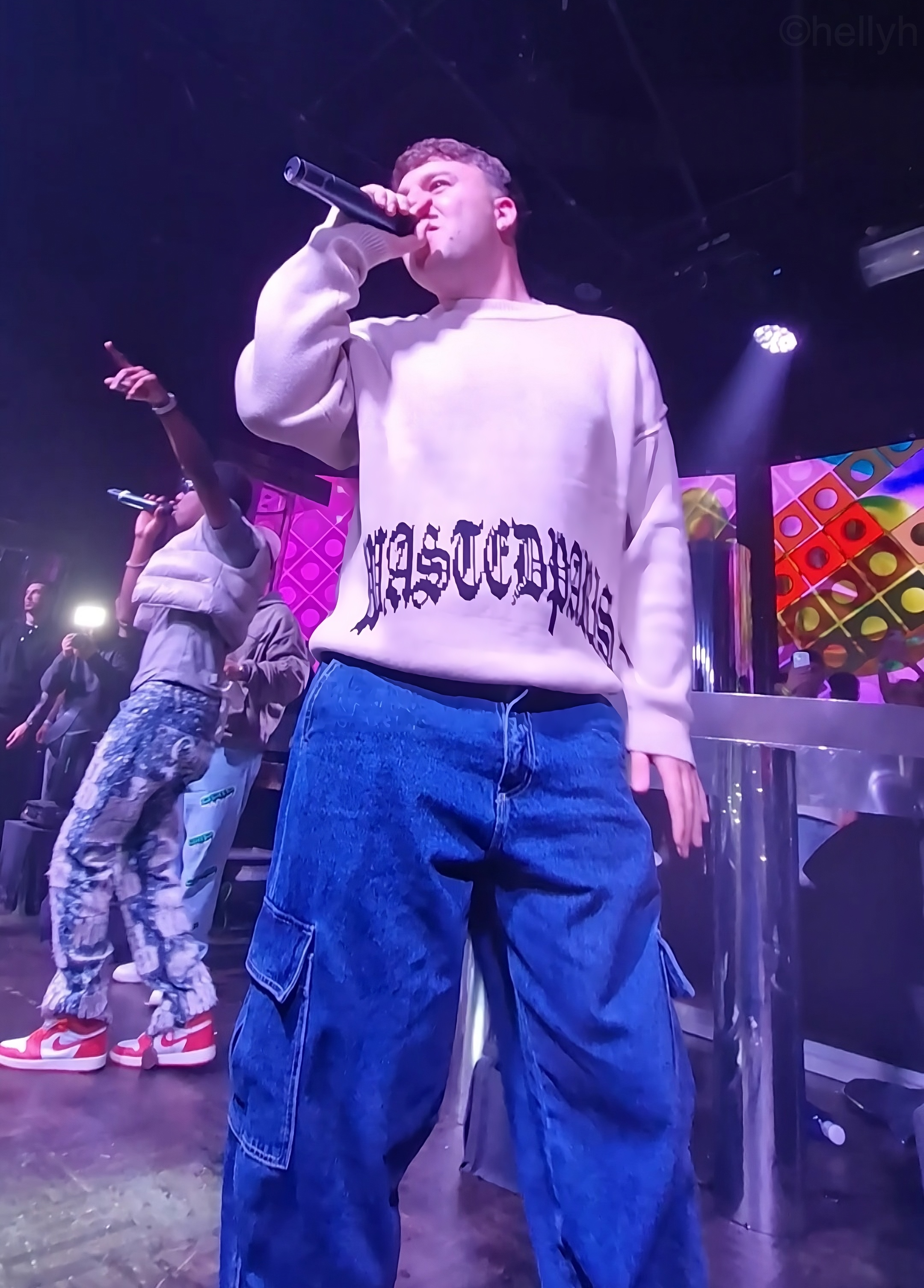
- Quevedo in 2023

Background information
- Born: Pedro Luis Domínguez Quevedo; 7 December 2001 (age 24); Madrid, Spain
- Genres: Reggaeton; Latin pop; Latin trap
- Occupations: Singer; rapper
- Years active: 2020–present
- Labels: Taste the Floor; DQE; Rimas
- Website: quevedoyouknow.com

Pedro Luis Domínguez Quevedo (Spanish pronunciation: [ˈpeðɾo ˈlwis doˈmiŋɡes keˈβeðo]; born 7 December 2001), known professionally as Quevedo, is a Spanish singer and rapper. He gained international recognition in 2022 with his collaboration "Quevedo: Bzrp Music Sessions, Vol. 52", which topped the global charts. A leading figure in the Canary Islands' urban music scene, Quevedo is known for his deep voice and eclectic style blending reggaeton, pop rap, and trap.

After a breakout period that included the release of his debut album Donde Quiero Estar (2023), Quevedo took a temporary hiatus in 2024 before returning with his second studio album, Buenas Noches (2024), which occupied the top 12 positions of the Spanish charts upon its release. As of 2026, he has achieved eighteen number-one songs in Spain and remains one of the most streamed Spanish artists globally.

== Biography ==
Quevedo was born in Madrid, Spain. When he was one year old, his family moved to Brazil, where he lived until the age of five. They subsequently returned to Spain, settling in Las Palmas. He attended the San Antonio María Claret School and later enrolled in a Business Administration and Management degree at university, but decided to drop out to focus entirely on his music career. He began freestyling in 2020, collaborating with producer Linton to launch his first tracks.

== Career ==
=== Early success and breakthrough (2020–2023) ===
Quevedo launched his professional career in 2020. His single "Ahora y Siempre" (2021) reached the 19th spot on Spotify's Global Viral 50 chart. In 2022, he collaborated with fellow Canarian artists Cruz Cafuné and Bejo on the remix of "Cayó la Noche", which became a local anthem. His global breakthrough came in July 2022 with the release of "Bzrp Music Sessions, Vol. 52" alongside Argentine producer Bizarrap. The track became the first song by a Spanish artist to reach number one on Spotify's Global Top 200 chart.

In January 2023, he released his debut studio album, Donde Quiero Estar, featuring collaborations with Myke Towers and Omar Montes. Later that year, he released "Columbia", which became one of his most successful commercial hits.

=== Hiatus, return and Buenas Noches (2024–present) ===
In February 2024, following the release of the introspection track "La última", Quevedo announced a temporary hiatus from music to prioritize his personal life. During this break, he released the track "7" in July under the pseudonym "Peter Lewis" (an English translation of his first names, Pedro Luis), which went largely unnoticed until he revealed the alias months later.

He officially returned to the public eye in October 2024 with the single "Duro", which debuted at number one in Spain. This was followed by his second studio album, Buenas Noches, released in November 2024. The album achieved immediate success, dominating streaming platforms. In 2025, Quevedo embarked on the Buenas Noches Tour and continued his tradition of releasing a major single on 7 July with the track "TUCHAT", marking the fourth consecutive year he released music on that specific date.

== Discography ==
=== Studio albums ===
List of studio albums, with selected details
Title	Details	Peak chart positions					Certifications
Title	Details	SPA	ITA	SWI	US Heat.	US Latin	Certifications
Donde Quiero Estar	Released: 20 January 2023; Label: Taste the Floor; Format: CD, digital download, streaming	1	42	35	4	12	FIMI: Gold; PROMUSICAE: 6× Platinum
Buenas Noches	Released: 22 November 2024; Label: DQE, Rimas; Format: Digital download, streaming	1	—	30	—	—	PROMUSICAE: 4× Platinum
El Baifo	Released: 24 April 2026; Label: DQE, Rimas; Format: Digital download, streaming	1	25	50	—	—	PROMUSICAE: 3× Platinum

=== Singles ===
List of singles as lead artist, with selected chart positions, showing year released and album name
Title	Year	Peak chart positions										Certifications	Album
Title	Year	SPA	ARG	BOL	CHL	COL	MEX	PAR	URU	US	US Latin	Certifications	Album
"Gris"	2020	—	—	—	—	—	—	—	—	—	—	PROMUSICAE: Gold	Non-album singles
"No Me Digas Nada"	2020	13	—	—	—	—	—	—	—	—	—	PROMUSICAE: 2× Platinum	Non-album singles
"Llegamos"	2020	—	—	—	—	—	—	—	—	—	—		Non-album singles
"Némesis"	2021	—	—	—	—	—	—	—	—	—	—		Non-album singles
"Cógelo Suave" (with La Pantera and o2 Tbb)	2021	—	—	—	—	—	—	—	—	—	—		Non-album singles
"No Me Olvido" (with Juseph)	2021	—	—	—	—	—	—	—	—	—	—	PROMUSICAE: Gold	Non-album singles
"Ya No Sé" (with Wos LasPalmas)	2021	—	—	—	—	—	—	—	—	—	—		Non-album singles
"Universitaria"	2021	81	—	—	—	—	—	—	—	—	—	PROMUSICAE: Platinum	Non-album singles
"Cayó la Noche" (with La Pantera and Juseph and remix featuring Abhir Hathi, Bejo and El Ima)	2021	1	13	22	8	—	—	7	5	—	—	PROMUSICAE: 6× Platinum	Non-album singles
"Noria"	2021	—	—	—	—	—	—	—	—	—	—		Non-album singles
"Piel de Cordero" (with La Pantera)	2021	6	—	—	—	—	—	—	—	—	—	PROMUSICAE: 4× Platinum	Non-album singles
"La Nena" (with Juseph)	2021	—	—	—	—	—	—	—	—	—	—		Non-album singles
"LB Music Session #5" (with Linton and Los BrezosBars)	2021	—	—	—	—	—	—	—	—	—	—		Non-album singles
"Rimmel"	2021	—	—	—	—	—	—	—	—	—	—	PROMUSICAE: Gold	Non-album singles
"Nana" (with Garzi)	2021	—	—	—	—	—	—	—	—	—	—	PROMUSICAE: Gold	Non-album singles
"Ahora y Siempre" (with Linton)	2021	9	—	—	—	—	—	—	—	—	—	PROMUSICAE: 4× Platinum	Non-album singles
"Estás con Él" (with Wos LasPalmas)	2021	—	—	—	—	—	—	—	—	—	—	PROMUSICAE: Gold	Non-album singles
"Respuesta Cero" (with BlueFire)	2022	24	—	—	—	—	—	—	—	—	—	PROMUSICAE: Platinum	Non-album singles
"Nonstop"	2022	25	—	—	—	—	—	—	—	—	—	PROMUSICAE: Gold	Non-album singles
"Jordan I" (with Saiko and La Mano de Oro)	2022	—	—	—	—	—	—	—	—	—	—		Non-album singles
"Si Quieren Frontear" (with Duki and De la Ghetto)	2022	4	6	21	—	—	—	14	2	—	—	PROMUSICAE: 2x Platinum	Temporada de Reggaetón 2
"Chamaquita" (with Juseph)	2022	26	—	—	—	—	—	—	—	—	—	PROMUSICAE: Platinum	Non-album singles
"Yatekomo" (with Juseph)	2022	46	—	—	—	—	—	—	—	—	—	PROMUSICAE: Platinum	Non-album singles
"Fernet" (with Rei)	2022	96	7	—	—	—	—	—	6	—	—	PROMUSICAE: Platinum	Non-album singles
"Quevedo: Bzrp Music Sessions, Vol. 52" (with Bizarrap)	2022	1	1	1	1	1	1	1	1	79	10	PROMUSICAE: 17× Platinum; RIAA: 15× Platinum (Latin)	Non-album singles
"Sin Señal" (with Ovy on the Drums)	2022	4	98	—	—	—	—	—	19	—	—	PROMUSICAE: 7× Platinum	Donde Quiero Estar
"Vista al Mar"	2022	2	14	17	9	—	—	4	7	—	—	PROMUSICAE: 7× Platinum	Donde Quiero Estar
"Punto G"	2022	2	7	12	15	—	—	12	3	—	—	PROMUSICAE: 7× Platinum	Donde Quiero Estar
"Apa" (with Mora)	2022	1	—	—	—	—	—	—	—	—	—	PROMUSICAE: 4× Platinum	Paraíso
"Lacone" (with Polimá Westcoast and Mora)	2022	13	—	—	10	—	—	60	—	—	—	PROMUSICAE: 2× Platinum	Non-album singles
"Real G" (with Bad Gyal)	2022	12	—	—	—	—	—	—	—	—	—	PROMUSICAE: Platinum	Non-album singles
"Playa del Inglés" (with Myke Towers)	2022	1	21	—	—	—	—	30	12	—	—	PROMUSICAE: 8× Platinum	Donde Quiero Estar
"Mami Chula" (with Jhayco)	2023	5	—	—	—	—	—	—	—	—	—	PROMUSICAE: 3× Platinum	Non-album single
"El Tonto" (with Lola Índigo)	2023	1	87	—	—	—	—	—	—	—	—	PROMUSICAE: 7× Platinum	El Dragón
"Sangre Y Fe" (with Cruz Cafuné)	2023	13	—	—	—	—	—	—	—	—	—	PROMUSICAE: Platinum	Non-album singles
"My Love" (with De la Ghetto)	2023	37	—	—	—	—	—	—	—	—	—	PROMUSICAE: Gold	Non-album singles
"Columbia"	2023	1	4	5	2	7	17	43	—	—	37	PROMUSICAE: 10× Platinum	Non-album singles
"En Alta" (with J Balvin, Omar Courtz, Yovngchimi, and Mambo Kingz)	2023	63	—	—	—	—	—	—	—	—	—		Non-album singles
"Buenas" (with Saiko)	2023	1	—	—	—	—	—	—	—	—	—	PROMUSICAE: 3× Platinum	Non-album singles
"OA" (with Anuel AA and Maluma featuring Mambo Kingz and DJ Lulian)	2023	5	—	—	—	—	—	—	—	—	—	PROMUSICAE: 3× Platinum	Non-album singles
"Gangster (PGFNEDG)" (with Ovy on the Drums and Yandel)	2023	21	—	—	—	—	—	—	—	—	—	PROMUSICAE: Gold	Non-album singles
"Ca'Manolo" (with Abhir Hathi)	2023	69	—	—	—	—	—	—	—	—	—		Non-album singles
"Quizás Si Quizás No" (with Álvaro Díaz)	2023	14	—	—	—	—	—	—	—	—	—	PROMUSICAE: Platinum; RIAA: Gold (Latin)	Sayonara
"La Última"	2024	1	—	—	—	—	—	—	—	—	—	PROMUSICAE: Platinum	Non-album single
"Duro"	2024	2	—	—	—	—	—	—	—	—	—	PROMUSICAE: Gold	Buenas Noches
"Gran Vía" (with Aitana)	2024	1	—	—	—	—	—	—	—	—	—		Buenas Noches
"Still Luvin'" (with Delaossa)	2025	1	—	—	—	—	—	—	—	—	—		De Madrugá
"Romeo y Julieta'" (with Eladio Carrión)	2025	5	—	—	—	—	—	—	—	—	—	PROMUSICAE: Platinum	Don Kbrn
"Soleao" (with Myke Towers)	2025	3	—	—	—	—	—	—	—	—	—		Island Boyz
"Yo y Tú" (with Ovy on the Drums and Beéle)	2025	3	5	5	9	10	—	—	—	—	38		Non-album singles
"Tuchat"	2025	1	—	—	—	—	—	—	—	—	—		Non-album singles
"Ni Borracho"	2026	1	—	—	—	—	—	—	—	—	—		Non-album singles
"Scandic"	2026	1	—	—	—	—	—	—	—	—	—		Non-album singles
"La Graciosa" (with Elvis Crespo)	2026	1	22	—	—	—	—	—	—	—	—		El Baifo
"Doggy" (with La Pantera)	2026	1	—	—	—	—	—	—	—	—	—		Non-album single
"—" denotes a recording that did not chart or was not released in that territory.

=== Promotional singles ===
List of promotional singles showing year released and album name
Title	Year	Album
"En Reformas"	2020	Non-album singles
"Planteamiento Erróneo"	2020	Non-album singles
"Luna"	2020	Non-album singles
"Gris" (with Roso)	2020	Non-album singles
"Me Fui en un Viaje" (with Mdmoney and Doc Psych)	2021	2060
"2step" (with Ed Sheeran)	2022	2step (The Remixes)

=== Other charted songs ===
List of other charted songs, showing year released, chart positions, and originating album
Title	Year	Peak chart positions						Certifications	Album
Title	Year	SPA	ARG	COL	PAR	URU	US	Certifications	Album
"WAOH" (with Kabasaki and Israel B)	2022	—	—	—	—	—	—	PROMUSICAE: Platinum	Non-album single
"Ahora Qué"	2023	3	—	—	—	—	—	PROMUSICAE: 2× Platinum	Donde Quiero Estar
"Cuéntale"	2023	15	—	—	—	—	—	PROMUSICAE: Platinum	Donde Quiero Estar
"Dame"	2023	9	—	—	—	—	—	PROMUSICAE: 2× Platinum	Donde Quiero Estar
"Donde Quiero Estar"	2023	21	—	—	—	—	—	PROMUSICAE: Gold	Donde Quiero Estar
"Éramos Dos"	2023	24	—	—	—	—	—	PROMUSICAE: Gold	Donde Quiero Estar
"Intro"	2023	36	—	—	—	—	—		Donde Quiero Estar
"Lisboa"	2023	17	—	—	—	—	—	PROMUSICAE: Platinum	Donde Quiero Estar
"Luces Azules"	2023	19	—	—	—	—	—	PROMUSICAE: Gold	Donde Quiero Estar
"Me Falta Algo"	2023	29	—	—	—	—	—	PROMUSICAE: Platinum	Donde Quiero Estar
"Muñeca"	2023	18	—	—	—	—	—	PROMUSICAE: Platinum	Donde Quiero Estar
"Wanda"	2023	6	55	—	33	15	—	PROMUSICAE: 5× Platinum	Donde Quiero Estar
"Yankee"	2023	7	—	—	—	—	—	PROMUSICAE: 2× Platinum	Donde Quiero Estar
"Pero Tú" (with Karol G)	2023	12	—	10	—	—	86	PROMUSICAE: 2× Platinum	Mañana Será Bonito
"Mi Nena" (remix) (with Maikel Delacalle)	2023	8	—	—	—	—	—	PROMUSICAE: 2× Platinum	Non-album single
"QUEVEDO #49 AFTER HOUR THE MIXTAPE" (with DJ Saot ST and Bluefire)	2023	54	—	—	—	—	—	PROMUSICAE: Gold	Non-album single
"Polaris" (Remix) (with Saiko, Mora and Feid)	2023	1	—	—	—	—	—	PROMUSICAE: 6× Platinum	Non-album single
"Don't Lie" (with Duki)	2023	48	—	—	—	—	—	PROMUSICAE: Gold	Antes de Ameri
"No Pienso Llamar" (with Soge Culebra and Garabatto)	2023	8	—	—	—	—	—	PROMUSICAE: 2× Platinum	
"Kassandra"	2024	2	—	—	—	—	—	PROMUSICAE: Gold	Buenas Noches
"Shibatto"	2024	2	—	—	—	—	—	PROMUSICAE: Gold	Buenas Noches
"Halo" (with La Pantera)	2024	7	—	—	—	—	—	PROMUSICAE: Gold	Buenas Noches
"Iguales"	2024	4	—	—	—	—	—	PROMUSICAE: Gold	Buenas Noches
"MR. Moondial" (with Pitbull)	2024	6	—	—	—	—	—	PROMUSICAE: Gold	Buenas Noches
"Los días Contados" (with Rels B)	2024	5	—	—	—	—	—	PROMUSICAE: Gold	Buenas Noches
"Chapiadora.com"	2024	10	—	—	—	—	—	PROMUSICAE: Gold	Buenas Noches
"ABC" (with Hoke)	2024	65	—	—	—	—	—		
"Guaya" (with Lucho RK)	2025	5	—	—	—	—	—		
"Desde 0" (with JC Reyes and Morad)	2025	10	—	—	—	—	—		Vivir Pa' Quedarse
"CHUOS" (with Juseph)	2025	5	—	—	—	—	—		LOS DEL GLAMOÜR
"Al Golpito" (with Nueva Linea)	2026	1	—	—	—	—	—		El Baifo

== Concert tours ==
- 2023: Donde Quiero Estar Tour
- 2025: Buenas Noches Tour
- 2026: El Baifo Tour

== Awards and nominations ==
Award	Year	Recipient(s) and nominee(s)	Category	Result	Ref.
Acervo Awards	2024	"Columbia"	Hit Latino	Nominated	
ASCAP Latin Music Awards	2021	"Quevedo: Bzrp Music Sessions, Vol. 52" (with Bizarrap)	Winning Song	Won	
Billboard Latin Music Awards	2023	"Quevedo: Bzrp Music Sessions, Vol. 52" (with Bizarrap)	Global 200 Latin Song of the Year	Nominated	
Billboard Latin Music Awards	2023	"Quevedo: Bzrp Music Sessions, Vol. 52" (with Bizarrap)	Latin Rhythm Song of the Year	Nominated	
Berlin Music Video Awards	2024	LA ÚLTIMA	Best VFX	Nominated	
Heat Latin Music Awards	2023	Himself	Revelation Artist	Nominated	
Heat Latin Music Awards	2023	"Quevedo: Bzrp Music Sessions, Vol. 52" (with Bizarrap)	Song of the Year	Nominated	
iHeartRadio Music Awards	2023	Himself	Best New Latin Artist	Nominated	
Latin American Music Awards	2023	Himself	New Artist of the Year	Nominated	
Latin American Music Awards	2023	"Quevedo: Bzrp Music Sessions, Vol. 52" (with Bizarrap)	Song of the Year	Nominated	
Latin American Music Awards	2023	"Quevedo: Bzrp Music Sessions, Vol. 52" (with Bizarrap)	Collaboration of the Year	Nominated	
Latin American Music Awards	2023	"Quevedo: Bzrp Music Sessions, Vol. 52" (with Bizarrap)	Best Collaboration - Pop/Urban	Nominated	
Latin American Music Awards	2024	Himself	Global Latin Artist of the Year	Nominated	
Latin Grammy Awards	2023	"Quevedo: Bzrp Music Sessions, Vol. 52" (with Bizarrap)	Best Urban Fusion/Performance	Nominated	
Latin Grammy Awards	2023	"Quevedo: Bzrp Music Sessions, Vol. 52" (with Bizarrap)	Best Urban Song	Won	
LOS40 Music Awards	2022	Himself	Best Urban Act	Nominated	
LOS40 Music Awards	2022	"Quevedo: Bzrp Music Sessions, Vol. 52" (with Bizarrap)	Best Song	Nominated	
LOS40 Music Awards	2022	"Quevedo: Bzrp Music Sessions, Vol. 52" (with Bizarrap)	Best Collaboration	Nominated	
LOS40 Music Awards	2023	Himself	Best Act	Nominated	
LOS40 Music Awards	2023	Himself	Best Urban Act	Won	
LOS40 Music Awards	2023	Donde Quiero Estar	Best Album	Nominated	
LOS40 Music Awards	2023	"El Tonto" (with Lola Índigo)	Best Song	Nominated	
LOS40 Music Awards	2023	"El Tonto" (with Lola Índigo)	Best Collaboration	Nominated	
MTV Europe Music Awards	2022	Himself	Best Spanish Act	Nominated	
MTV Europe Music Awards	2023	Himself	Best Spanish Act	Nominated	
Premios de la Academia de Música	2024	Himself	Artist of the Year	Nominated	
Premios de la Academia de Música	2024	"El Tonto" (with Lola Índigo)	Song of the Year	Nominated	
Premios de la Academia de Música	2024	Donde Quiero Estar	Best Urban Music Album	Won	
Premios de la Academia de Música	2024	"Columbia"	Best Urban Song	Won	
Premios de la Academia de Música	2024	"El Tonto" (with Lola Índigo)	Best Music Video	Nominated	
Premios Juventud	2023	Himself	The New Generation - Male	Nominated	
Premios Juventud	2023	Donde Quiero Estar	Best Pop/Urban Album	Nominated	
Premios Juventud	2023	"Quevedo: Bzrp Music Sessions, Vol. 52" (with Bizarrap)	Best Pop/Urban Collaboration	Nominated	
Premios Lo Nuestro	2023	Himself	New Artist – Male	Nominated	
Premios Lo Nuestro	2023	"Quevedo: Bzrp Music Sessions, Vol. 52" (with Bizarrap)	Urban Dance/Pop Song of the Year	Won	
Premios Lo Nuestro	2024	"Polaris Remix" (with Saiko, Feid & Mora)	Remix of the Year	Nominated	
Premios Lo Nuestro	2024	"Columbia"	Urban/Pop Song of the Year	Nominated	
Premios Carlos Gardel	2023	"Quevedo: Bzrp Music Sessions, Vol. 52" (with Bizarrap)	Song of the Year	Nominated	
Premios Carlos Gardel	2023	"Quevedo: Bzrp Music Sessions, Vol. 52" (with Bizarrap)	Record of the Year	Nominated	
Premios Carlos Gardel	2023	"Quevedo: Bzrp Music Sessions, Vol. 52" (with Bizarrap)	Best Urban Music Song	Won	
Premos Ícono	2023	Himself	Best Music Artist	Nominated	
Premios Odeón	2023	"Quevedo: Bzrp Music Sessions, Vol. 52" (with Bizarrap)	Song of the Year	Won	
Premios Odeón	2023	"Quevedo: Bzrp Music Sessions, Vol. 52" (with Bizarrap)	Video of the Year	Won	
Premios Odeón	2023	"Quevedo: Bzrp Music Sessions, Vol. 52" (with Bizarrap)	Best Urban Song	Won	
Premios Odeón	2024	Donde Quiero Estar	Album of the Year	Won	
Premios Odeón	2024	"Columbia"	Best Urban Song	Won	
Premios Quiero	2022	"Quevedo: Bzrp Music Sessions, Vol. 52" (with Bizarrap)	Best Urban Video	Nominated	
Premios Tu Música Urbano	2023	Himself	Top Rising Star - Male	Nominated	
Premios Tu Música Urbano	2023	"Quevedo: Bzrp Music Sessions, Vol. 52" (with Bizarrap)	Song of the Year	Nominated	
Premios Tu Música Urbano	2023	"Playa del Inglés" (with Myke Towers)	Top Song - Pop Urban	Nominated	
Premios Tu Música Urbano	2023	Donde Quiero Estar	Album of the Year - New Artist	Nominated	
