= Quevedo: Bzrp Music Sessions, Vol. 52 =

2022 single by Bizarrap and Quevedo

Single by Bizarrap and Quevedo
- Language: Spanish
- Released: July 6, 2022
- Recorded: 2022
- Studio: BZRP (Ramos Mejía, Buenos Aires, Argentina)
- Genre: Dance-pop
- Length: 3:18
- Label: Dale Play
- Songwriters: Gonzalo Julián Conde; Pedro Domínguez Quevedo; Santiago Alvarado
- Producer: Bizarrap

Bizarrap singles chronology
"Villano Antillano: Bzrp Music Sessions, Vol. 51" (2022)	"Quevedo: Bzrp Music Sessions, Vol. 52" (2022)	"Duki: Bzrp Music Sessions, Vol. 50" (2022)

Quevedo singles chronology
"Fernet" (2022)	"Quevedo: Bzrp Music Sessions, Vol. 52" (2022)	"Sin Señal" (2022)

Music video
- "Quevedo: Bzrp Music Sessions, Vol. 52" on YouTube

"Quevedo: Bzrp Music Sessions, Vol. 52" (also known as "Quédate" (Note: English: "Stay")) is a song by Argentine producer Bizarrap and Spanish rapper Quevedo. It was released on July 6, 2022, through Dale Play Records, with the music video released on Bizarrap's YouTube channel the following day. This is the sixth Bzrp Music Sessions to feature a Spanish artist, and the fourth to feature an artist from the Canary Islands.

== Background ==
The session was first teased during Villano Antillano's Session, in which during the 0:45 second, Residente's cap, which can be seen in the background in Bizarrap's desk, changes from an R to a Q, leading fans to suspect a future session with Quevedo.

The session was officially announced in July 4, 2022 through a promotional video on Bizarrap's Instagram, in which he made a special menu in a Burger King in Madrid, the bags which contained a toy of himself with a part of the chorus of the session, and delivered them himself.

== Commercial performance ==
"Quevedo: Bzrp Music Sessions, Vol. 52" reached number one in Latin American countries such as Argentina, Bolivia, Chile, Colombia, Ecuador, Honduras, Mexico, Paraguay and Peru; as well as topping the charts in Italy, Portugal and Spain. Additionally, the song charted at number one on the Billboard Global 200 during its second week chart appearance, being the second Spanish song to top on that chart after "Dakiti" of the Puerto Ricans Bad Bunny and Jhayco. In the Billboard Hot 100, "Quevedo: Bzrp Music Sessions, Vol. 52" debuted at number 98 and reached a peak position of 79 later on. In the US Hot Latin Songs it peaked at number 10. it was also featured in the soundtrack for the video game WWE 2K23

== Music video ==
The music video for "Quevedo: Bzrp Music Sessions, Vol. 52" was released on YouTube on July 6, 2022 which shows both Bizarrap and Quevedo performing the song. During the 2:28 second, a cameo of SpongeBob's Patrick Star can be seen. It was later blurred out due to a subsequent lawsuit by Nickelodeon. The song was viewed more than 10 million times within the first twenty-four hours of its release. As of March 26, 2024, the video has accumulated 633 million views on YouTube.

== Charts ==
=== Weekly charts ===
Weekly chart performance for "Quevedo: Bzrp Music Sessions, Vol. 52"
Chart (2022–2023)	Peak position
Argentina (Argentina Hot 100)	1
Bolivia (Billboard)	1
Canada (Canadian Hot 100)	95
Chile (Billboard)	1
Colombia (Billboard)	1
Costa Rica (Monitor Latino)	4
Dominican Republic (Monitor Latino)	2
Ecuador (Billboard)	1
El Salvador (Monitor Latino)	3
France (SNEP)	158
Global 200 (Billboard)	1
Guatemala (Monitor Latino)	8
Honduras (Monitor Latino)	1
Italy (FIMI)	1
Mexico (Billboard)	1
Nicaragua (Monitor Latino)	1
Panama (Monitor Latino)	1
Paraguay (Monitor Latino)	1
Peru (Billboard)	1
Portugal (AFP)	1
San Marino (SMRRTV Top 50)	21
Spain (PROMUSICAE)	1
Switzerland (Schweizer Hitparade)	15
Uruguay (Monitor Latino)	1
US Billboard Hot 100	79
US Hot Dance/Electronic Songs (Billboard)	4
US Hot Latin Songs (Billboard)	10
US Latin Airplay (Billboard)	1

=== Monthly charts ===
Monthly chart performance for "Quevedo: Bzrp Music Sessions, Vol. 52"
Chart (July 2022)	Peak position
Paraguay (SGP)	8
Uruguay (CUDISCO)	1

=== Year-end charts ===
2022 year-end chart performance for "Quevedo: Bzrp Music Sessions, Vol. 52"
Chart (2022)	Position
Argentina (Monitor Latino)	23
Costa Rica (Monitor Latino)	18
Dominican Republic (Monitor Latino)	13
El Salvador (Monitor Latino)	21
Global 200 (Billboard)	35
Guatemala (Monitor Latino)	22
Honduras (Monitor Latino)	13
Italy (FIMI)	30
Nicaragua (Monitor Latino)	11
Panama (Monitor Latino)	11
Paraguay (Monitor Latino)	16
Puerto Rico (Monitor Latino)	73
Spain (PROMUSICAE)	1
Switzerland (Schweizer Hitparade)	62
Uruguay (Monitor Latino)	7
US Hot Dance/Electronic Songs (Billboard)	12
US Hot Latin Songs (Billboard)	33

2023 year-end chart performance for "Quevedo: Bzrp Music Sessions, Vol. 52"
Chart (2023)	Position
Argentina (Monitor Latino)	37
Costa Rica (Monitor Latino)	24
Dominican Republic (Monitor Latino)	48
El Salvador (Monitor Latino)	17
Global 200 (Billboard)	40
Guatemala (Monitor Latino)	23
Honduras (Monitor Latino)	15
Italy (FIMI)	9
Nicaragua (Monitor Latino)	12
Panama (Monitor Latino)	5
Paraguay (Monitor Latino)	10
Switzerland (Schweizer Hitparade)	19
Uruguay (Monitor Latino)	11
US Hot Dance/Electronic Songs (Billboard)	10
US Hot Latin Songs (Billboard)	75
US Latin Airplay Songs (Billboard)	20

== Certifications ==
Certifications and sales for "Quevedo: Bzrp Music Sessions, Vol. 52"
Region	Certification	Certified units/sales
France (SNEP)	Gold	100,000^{‡}
Italy (FIMI)	8× Platinum	800,000^{‡}
Mexico (AMPROFON)	2× Diamond+Platinum	1,540,000^{‡}
Portugal (AFP)	4× Platinum	40,000^{‡}
Spain (PROMUSICAE)	17× Platinum	1,020,000^{‡}
United States (RIAA)	15× Platinum (Latin)	900,000^{‡}
Streaming
Chile (PROFOVI)	2× Diamond	82,000,000
^{‡} Sales+streaming figures based on certification alone.

== See also ==
- List of Billboard Argentina Hot 100 number-one singles of 2022
- List of Billboard Global 200 number ones of 2022
- List of Billboard Hot Latin Songs and Latin Airplay number ones of 2022
- List of best-selling singles in Spain
