= Punto G (Quevedo song) =

Single by Quevedo

from the album Donde Quiero Estar
- Language: Spanish
- English title: "G Spot"
- Released: 4 November 2022
- Recorded: October 2022
- Genre: Reggaeton
- Length: 2:32
- Songwriter: Pedro Luis Domínguez Quevedo

Quevedo singles chronology
"Vista al Mar" (2022)	"Punto G" (2022)	"Lacone" (2022)

Music video
- "Punto G" on YouTube

"Punto G" (Spanish for "G Spot") is a song by the Spanish singer Quevedo. Released as the third single from their album Donde Quiero Estar.

== Background and release ==
After releasing his single "Vista al Mar" he started recording his next song.

At the end of October 2022, he announced on his social networks that he would release a new solo single called "Punto G". The song was released on November 4 of that same year.

== Copyright violation ==
On January 18, 2023, Quevedo was charged for his song "Punto G" for plagiarism at the end of his song by Brytiago, which caused the singer to change the final part of the song, that is, the lyrics.

== Music video ==
The official music video was released on 4 November 2022. In the video Quevedo can be seen singing and dancing in a concert and also underwater along with another person submerging.

== Charts ==
=== Weekly charts ===
Weekly chart performance for "Punto G"
Chart (2023)	Peak position
Spain (Promusicae)	2

=== Year-end charts ===
Year-end chart performance for "Punto G"
Chart (2023)	Position
Global Excl. US (Billboard)	141

== Certifications ==
Certifications for "Punto G"
Region	Certification	Certified units/sales
Italy (FIMI)	Gold	50,000^{‡}
Spain (Promusicae)	7× Platinum	420,000^{‡}
^{‡} Sales+streaming figures based on certification alone.
