= Potra salvaje =

2021 single by Isabel Aaiún

Single by Isabel Aaiún Remix featuring Fernando Moreno

from the album La potra salvaje
- Released: 1 December 2021 (original); 14 October 2023 (Hard remix)
- Recorded: 2021 (original)
- Genre: Flamenco; Sevillanas (original); EDM; neofolk; electronic; rave (Hard remix)
- Length: 3:19 (original); 5:41 (Hard remix)
- Label: Sello Níquel
- Songwriters: Isabel Aaiún; Pablo Mora
- Producers: Michael K. Lowan (original); Fernando Moreno (Hard remix)

Isabel Aaiún singles chronology
"Potra salvaje" (2021)	"Tacones de viento" (2022)

Isabel Aaiún singles chronology
"Mano rota" (2023)	"Potra salvaje (Hard remix)" (2023)	"La partida" (2023)

Fernando Moreno singles chronology
"Se alzarán las banderas" (2023)	"Potra salvaje (Hard remix)" (2023)	"Columbia (Hardstyle remix)" (2023)

Music video
- "Potra salvaje" (original version) on YouTube

Audio
- "Potra salvaje" (Hard remix) on YouTube

"Potra salvaje" (transl. "Wild Colt") is a song by Spanish singer Isabel Aaiún. It was released on 1 December 2021 by Sello Níquel, in which it served as the first preview and title track of Aaiún's debut studio album La potra salvaje.

In early 2024, the Hard techno remix went viral on TikTok Spain, quickly climbing the country's playlists. Later, the Spain national water polo, volleyball, tennis, and football teams adopted the song as their unofficial anthem, further promoting its nationwide popularity. Footballer Dani Carvajal sang the song alongside Cristiano Ronaldo and Gerard Piqué at a Malaysian nightclub. Aaiún performed the song live at the Madrid celebrations for Spain's fourth European Championship victory.

Following Spain's victory at UEFA Euro 2024, listens to both songs skyrocketed, especially the original remix, taking "Potra salvaje" (Note: PROMUSICAE features remixes of songs from the original) to the top of the official Spanish singles chart, becoming the singer's first number one hit.

== Background and composition ==
Aaiún originally wrote the song as "an anthem for fighting women" who don't want "to be more than anyone else."

During the Euro 2024 celebrations, the Spain national team asked her to slightly modify the lyrics to "I already have six tattoos/Under the suit for seven reasons/I'm a wild filly/Going on a journey... to win the game" so that it would not lose its original meaning and would better adapt to the sporting context.

== Reception ==
The newspaper 20 minutos reported how Aaiún did not expect the reception, adding "The only promotion the song has had are my performances in Teruel, which I played whenever I could because I believed so much in the result. It was that public that started to move it," she explained in El Confidencial. The co-writer and performer responded positively to the reception of the song by the national sports world. The interpreter declared adding that the players of the Spain national football team Nico Williams and Lamine Yamal were "the real wild colts."

Many media outlets are calling the song "The unofficial anthem of Euro 2024" and "the song of the summer of 2024." The newspaper ABC named "Potra salvaje" the song of the summer due to its reception in pubs, clubs, and village festivals. In addition to its good reception on streaming platforms and its reception by the national sports world. El Correo in an article stated that thanks to its vitality on TikTok, its reception by the different Spain national teams, and its great commercial reception by the public, the song is the song of the summer.

== Charts ==
Chart (2024)	Peak position
Spain (PROMUSICAE)	1

== Certifications ==
Region	Certification	Certified units/sales
Spain (Promusicae)	5× Platinum	300,000^{‡}
^{‡} Sales+streaming figures based on certification alone.
