= Isabel Aaiún =

Spanish singer (born 1987)

- Born: Isabel Casado; 1987 (age 38–39); Madrid, Spain
- Occupation: Singer

Isabel Casado (born 1987), known professionally as Isabel Aaiún, is a Spanish singer of the neofolk genre.

In 2024, Aaiún rose to Spanish national recognition thanks to a remix by Fernando Moreno of her song "Potra salvaje", managing to position herself in second place in the Top 100 Songs of PROMUSICAE. In addition, she positioned herself in fourth place in the Top 200 streaming weekly in Spain on the Spotify platform accumulating 2,958,211 streams that week.

== Biography ==
Born in Madrid, and raised in the nearby Segovian municipality of Veganzones, with 200 inhabitants, Aaiún is the daughter, granddaughter and great-granddaughter of shoemakers. As a child, she has had two passions, horses, with which she has been a professional rider, riding teacher and horse trainer, and music. In her family, her aunt plays the guitar, her uncle plays the violin, and her cousin is a saxophonist.

== Musical career ==
In 2019, Pablo Mora, singer of Lagarto Amarillo, proposed that Aaiún collaborate with him on his song Mano rota. And with the help of this, Aaiún signed with Níquel Records in 2020, and, at the end of 2021, she released her first song, Potra salvaje (literally meaning "wild filly"), a theme with a message of feminist courage whose video clip she recorded in an abandoned livestock warehouse and in the hermitage of the Virgen del Pinar in Cantalejo. At the end of the video clip, she dedicates it to all the free, independent and wild women who fight every day to defend their place in the world.

The song had a great impact from the remix that DJ Fernando Moreno made of it in 2023. Its viralization on the networks increased thanks to the fact that it was played at the celebration of Real Madrid's fifteenth Champions League, on 1 June 2024. A month later, upon learning that the players of the Spain national football team were playing it to motivate themselves before each UEFA Euro 2024 match, the song was number 2 in Spotify's top-50 of most viral songs in Spain and achieved more than 19 million streams. After Spanish national team won the competition, Isabel Aaiún performed the song at the victory celebrations in Madrid. In July 2026, during the celebrations in Madrid for the Spanish national team's victory in the 2026 FIFA World Cup, the singer was scheduled to perform "Potra salvaje" again, as she had done during the celebrations for the UEFA Euro 2024 victory. However, she was ultimately unable to attend because a fire in the province of Segovia affected one of her properties, endangering her horses.

In November 2023, Aaiún decided to end her career as a rider and devote herself to music. In February 2024 she releases her first album La potra salvaje, which she presented at the Juan Bravo Theater in Segovia, on 21 February. It was also announced that on 26 October 2024, Aaiún would begin her first tour of the country in La Sala del WiZink Center in Madrid.

Composed with Pablo Mora and produced by Michel K.Lowan, the album includes a variety of styles, rumbas such as "A gastar la calle", "La laca" and "Mano rota"", pasodobles such as "Soy feriante" and the ranchera of "La partida". Her lyrics and melodies are framed in a neofolk style, a combination of popular culture, classic Spanish folklore such as Marifé de Triana, Rocío Jurado and Los Panchos, modern and current sounds.

In 2026, she was announced as a participant of Benidorm Fest 2027.

== Musical style ==
Aaiún's style is characterized by authenticity and vocal strength, always seeking to transmit messages of strength and freedom. It mixes traditional folklore and melodies with the most current music.

== Discography ==
Studio albums

List of Studio albums, with selected details
Title	Details
La potra salvaje	Released: 9 February 2024; Label: Níquel Records; Formats: CD, Digital download, streaming
