= Cruz Cafuné =

Spanish rapper (born 1993)

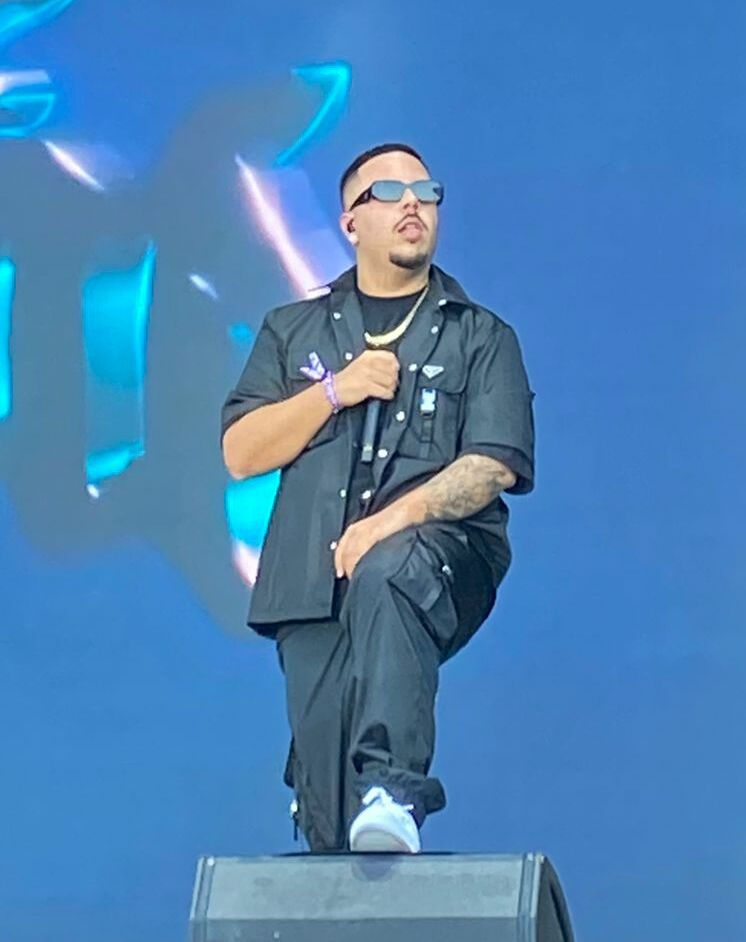
- Cafuné in 2023

Background information
- Also known as: Cruzzi; Cibi; Groovy Carajito; Fiolo Suave; Carlito
- Born: Carlos Bruñas Zamorín; 29 June 1993 (age 33); Tenerife, Spain
- Genres: Latin hip-hop; urbano; R&B
- Occupations: Rapper; singer
- Instrument: Vocals
- Years active: 1998–present
- Label: Mécèn Entertainment
- Website: cruzcafune.es

Carlos Bruñas Zamorín, professionally called Cruz Cafuné, is a Spanish rapper born on June 25, 1993 in Tacoronte, Canary Islands, Spain.

Throughout his career, many of his singles has reached commercial success in Spain. "Mi casa" who became his breakthrough song, "Contando lunares" with rapper Don Patricio, which reached number one in PROMUSICAE Top 100 charts. "Muchoperro" with Juseph and Wilson Rivera and "Sangre y fé" with rapper Quevedo among others.

== Early life ==
Cruz Cafuné was born in Tenerife, Canary Islands in 1993. During his teenage years, he became involved in the underground music scene of the Islands, where GQ magazine later reported him as an influential artist before he recorded his first album. During this time he was a member of the collective BNMP (Broke Niños Make Pesos).

== Career ==
Over his career he has headlined stages at festivals including the Primavera Sound Festival and the Cruïlla festival in Barcelona, and has also toured Spain in support of his original music. In 2016 he released two rap songs “Amen” and “Mi Casa”. He released his first album Maracucho Bueno Muere Chiquito in 2018, which was lauded by El Confidential as blending rap, Latin, and trap; and later recorded the collaboration “Contando lunares” with Don Patricio. His second album was entitled Moonlight922.

In 2022 Cafuné released the collaborative song “Cayó la noche Remix”, which reached number one on the Spanish Spotify chart, and went platinum four times in that nation. In 2023 he had 2.5 million monthly listeners on the platform.

In 2023 Cafuné released his album Me Muevo con Dios, and received the fourth highest number of listens for a debut in the chart's history. It is a concept album based on the idea that sharks never stop swimming during their life as water must continue to flow over their gills. The track “Fabiola” on the album was dedicated to his younger sister.
