= 2026 Billboard Latin Music Awards =

Latin music awards ceremony

33rd Billboard Latin Music Awards
- Date: October 22, 2026
- Location: James L. Knight Center; Miami, Florida
- Country: United States

Highlights
- Most nominations: Peso Pluma (17)

Television/radio coverage
- Network: Telemundo; Peacock

The 33rd Billboard Latin Music Awards, presented by Billboard to honor the most popular albums, songs and performers in Latin music, will be held at the James L. Knight Center in Miami on October 22, 2026. The ceremony will be broadcast on Telemundo and stream on Peacock.

== Winners and nominees ==
The nominations were announced on September 9, 2026. Peso Pluma led with 17 nominations. He is followed by Tito Double P with 15, Fuerza Regida with 12, Karol G—the most nominated female artist—with nine, Prince Royce with eight and Bad Bunny with seven.

Winners appear first and highlighted in bold.

| Artist of the Year | New Artist of the Year |
|---|---|
| **Bad Bunny**; Fuerza Regida; Karol G; Peso Pluma; Tito Double P | **Omar Courtz**; El De Las R’s; Emmanuel Cortes; Gael Valenzuela; Herencia de Grandes |
| Tour of the Year | Crossover Artist of the Year |
| **Bad Bunny**; Karol G; Pitbull; Ricardo Arjona; Shakira | **Burna Boy**; Bruno Mars; DJ Snake; Shenseea; Steve Aoki |
| Global 200 Latin Artist of the Year | Global 200 Latin Song of the Year |
| **Bad Bunny**; Beéle; Fuerza Regida; Karol G; Shakira | **"Marlboro Rojo"** – **Fuerza Regida**; "Cuando No Era Cantante (Remix)" – El Bogueto, Fuerza Regida, Anuel AA & Yung Beef; "daño" – Peso Pluma & Tito Double P; "La Perla" – Rosalía & Yahritza y su Esencia; "La Plena (W Sound 05)" – W Sound, Beéle & Ovy on the Drums |
| Hot Latin Song of the Year | Hot Latin Song of the Year, Vocal Event |
| **"Marlboro Rojo"** – **Fuerza Regida**; "Ya Borracho" – Herencia de Grandes; "Ayúdame" – Los Dos De Tamaulipas; "daño" – Peso Pluma & Tito Double P; "dopamina" – Peso Pluma & Tito Double P | **"daño"** – **Peso Pluma & Tito Double P**; "Cuando No Era Cantante (Remix)" – El Bogueto, Fuerza Regida, Anuel AA & Yung Beef; "7-3" – Peso Pluma & Tito Double P; "dopamina" – Peso Pluma & Tito Double P; "chiclona" – Peso Pluma, Tito Double P & LENCHO |
| Hot Latin Songs Artist of the Year, Male | Hot Latin Songs Artist of the Year, Female |
| **Bad Bunny**; Junior H; Omar Courtz; Peso Pluma; Tito Double P | **Karol G**; Kali Uchis; RaiNao; Rosalía; Shakira |
| Duo/Group Hot Latin Songs Artist of the Year | Hot Latin Songs Label of the Year |
| **Fuerza Regida**; Grupo Frontera; Herencia de Grandes; Hermanos Espinoza; Los Dos De Tamaulipas | **Rimas**; Double P Records; Interscope Capitol; Sony Music Latin; Warner Latina |
Streaming Song of the Year
**"Marlboro Rojo"** – **Fuerza Regida**; "Amor" – Emmanuel Cortes; "Andiedad" – Fuerza Regida; "Ayúdame" – Los Dos De Tamaulipas; "daño" – Peso Pluma & Tito Double P
| Airplay Song of the Year | Airplay Label of the Year |
| **"Lokita Por Mí"** – Romeo Santos **& Prince Royce**; "Bzrp Music Sessions, Vol. 0/66" – Bizarrap & Daddy Yankee; "Coleccionando Heridas" – Karol G & Marco Antonio Solís; "I Want It That Way" – Prince Royce; "Dardos" – Romeo Santos & Prince Royce | **Sony Music Latin**; Interscope Capitol; Rimas; Universal Music Latin Entertainment; Warner Latina |
| Top Latin Album of the Year | Top Latin Albums Artist of the Year, Duo/Group |
| **Dinastía** – **Peso Pluma & Tito Double P**; Borondo – Beéle; MIJA NO TE ASUSTES – Clave Especial; Por Si Mañana No Estoy – Omar Courtz; Lux – Rosalía | **Fuerza Regida**; Aventura; Clave Especial; Grupo Frontera; Los Dos De Tamaulipas |
| Top Latin Albums Artist of the Year, Male | Top Latin Albums Artist of the Year, Female |
| **Bad Bunny**; Junior H; Peso Pluma; Rauw Alejandro; Tito Double P | **Karol G**; Becky G; Kali Uchis; Rosalía; Young Miko |
Top Latin Albums Label of the Year
v; Double P Records; Interscope Capitol; Sony Music Latin; Warner Latina
| Latin Pop Artist of the Year | Latin Pop Duo/Group of the Year |
| **Rosalía**; Danny Ocean; Kali Uchis; Kapo; Shakira | **Maná**; Matisse; Morat; Rawayana; Reik |
| Latin Pop Song of the Year | Latin Pop Album of the Year |
| **"Coleccionando Heridas"** – **Karol G & Marco Antonio Solís**; "El Vino de Tu Boca" – Alejandro Sanz & Carín León; "Bronceador" – Maluma; "Besito en La Frente" – Rauw Alejandro; "Algo Tú" – Shakira & Beéle | **Lux** – **Rosalía**; Baraja Bendita – Becky G; 9 Months & 50 Hours – Fred again.. & Latin Mafia, No Me Arrepiento de Sentir Tanto – Karol G; Hasta el Fin Del Mundo – Kevin Kaarl |
| Latin Pop Airplay Label of the Year | Latin Pop Albums Label of the Year |
| **Sony Music Latin**; AP Global; Interscope Capitol; Universal Music Latin Entertainment; Warner Latina | **Sony Music Latin**; Columbia; Interscope Capitol; Universal Music Latin Entertainment; Warner Latina |
| Tropical Artist of the Year, Solo | Tropical Artist of the Year, Duo or Group |
| **Romeo Santos**; Carlos Vives; Jerry Rivera; Marc Anthony; Prince Royce | **Aventura**; Grupo Cañaveral de Humberto Pabón; Grupo Niche; La Sonora Dinamita; Monchy & Alexandra |
| Tropical Song of the Year | Tropical Album of the Year |
| **"Dardos"** – **Romeo Santos & Prince Royce**; "Sonríele" – Daddy Yankee; "Que Me Quiera Má" – Marc Anthony & Wisin; "I Want It That Way" – Prince Royce; "Lokita Por Mí" – Romeo Santos & Prince Royce | **Better Late Than Never** – **Romeo Santos & Prince Royce**; La Bachata Volvió – Dalvin La Melodía; Antes Que El Tiempo Se Vaya – Fonseca; Live at Thalia Home – LA LOM, La Parranda Es Mía – Víctor Manuelle |
| Tropical Songs Airplay Label of the Year | Tropical Albums Label of the Year |
| **Sony Music Latin**; HYBE Latin America; Rimas; RMGroup; Universal Music Latin Entertainment | **Sony Music Latin**; Concord; The Orchard; Universal Music Enterprises; Universal Music Latin Entertainment |
| Regional Mexican Artist of the Year, Solo | Regional Mexican Artist of the Year, Duo or Group |
| **Peso Pluma**; Dareyes de La Sierra; Junior H; Neton Vega; Tito Double P | **Fuerza Regida**; Clave Especial; Grupo Frontera; Herencia de Grandes; Los Dos De Tamaulipas |
| Regional Mexican Song of the Year | Regional Mexican Album of the Year |
| **"Marlboro Rojo"** – **Fuerza Regida**; "Amor" – Emmanuel Cortes, "Ya Borracho" – Herencia de Grandes, "daño" – Peso Pluma & Tito Double P; "No Capea" – Xavi & Grupo Frontera | **Dinastía** – **Peso Pluma & Tito Double P**; Mija No Te Asustes – Clave Especial; Redención – Dareyes de La Sierra, Depr< 3$$Ed Mfkz – Junior H & Gael Valenzuela, Rico o Muerto – Óscar Maydon |
| Regional Mexican Airplay Label of the Year | Regional Mexican Albums Label of the Year |
| **Universal Music Latin Entertainment**; Afinarte; Azteca; Music VIP; Sony Music Latin | **Double P Records**; Interscope Capitol; Sony Music Latin; Universal Music Latin Entertainment; Warner Latina |
| Latin Rhythm Artist of the Year, Solo | Latin Rhythm Artist of the Year, Duo or Group |
| **Bad Bunny**; Karol G; Omar Courtz; Ozuna; Rauw Alejandro | **Wisin & Yandel**; Baby Rasta & Gringo; Gente de Zona; Jowell & Randy; W Sound |
| Latin Rhythm Song of the Year | Latin Rhythm Album of the Year |
| **"Bzrp Music Sessions, Vol. 0/66"**– **Bizarrap & Daddy Yankee**; "Se Lo Juro Mor" – Feid; "Si Te Vas"– J Balvin & Jay Wheeler; "La Villa" – Ryan Castro, Kapo & Gangsta; "5 Estrellas (W Sound 23)" – W Sound, Myke Towers & Ovy On The Drums | **Por Si Mañana No Estoy** – **Omar Courtz**; Borondo – Beéle; La Voz Favorita – Jay Wheeler; Cosa Nuestra: Capítulo 0 – Rauw Alejandro; Tutankamon – Victor Mendivil |
| Latin Rhythm Airplay Label of the Year | Latin Rhythm Albums Label of the Year |
| **Sony Music Latin**; Interscope Capitol; Rimas; Universal Music Latin Entertainment; Warner Latina | **Rimas**; 5020; Interscope Capitol; Sony Music Latin; Universal Music Latin Entertainment |
| Songwriter of the Year | Producer of the Year |
| **Bad Bunny**; Armenta; Mag; Peso Pluma; Roberto "La Paciencia" José Rosado Torres | **Mag**; Ernesto "Neto" Fernández; Jesús Iván "El Parka" Leal Reyes; Peso Pluma; Roberto "La Paciencia" José Rosado Torres |
| Publisher of the Year | Fan Favorite Artist |
| **Street Mob ENT, BMI**; Risamar Publishing, BMI; RSM Publishing, ASCAP; Universal Music Corp., ASCAP; Warner-Tamerlane Publishing Corp., BMI | **Karol G**; Fuerza Regida; Peso Pluma; Prince Royce; Tito Double P |
