= Premio Lo Nuestro 2026 =

- Date: Thursday, February 19, 2026
- Venue: Kaseya Center, Miami
- Country: United States
- Hosted by: Thalía, Clarissa Molina, Nadia Ferreira

Highlights
- Most awards: Bad Bunny (6)
- Most nominations: Bad Bunny, Carín León, Myke Towers, and Rauw Alejandro (10)
- Website: www.univision.com/shows/premio-lo-nuestro

Television/radio coverage
- Network: Univision; Galavisión; UniMás; Canal 5; Vix

The 38th Premio Lo Nuestro was held at the Kaseya Center in Miami on February 19, 2026, and will be broadcast on Univision, UniMás, Galavisión, and Canal 5, with streaming available on the Vix platform. The ceremony was hosted by Thalía, Clarissa Molina, and Nadia Ferreira.

Bad Bunny, Carín León, Myke Towers, and Rauw Alejandro lead the nominations with 10 each. Bad Bunny won six awards, including Artist of the Year, Album of the Year for Debí Tirar Más Fotos and Song of the Year for "DTMF", followed by Carín León with five awards.

Colombian musician Juanes was honored with the Lifetime Achievement Award while Spanish singer Paloma San Basilio was recognized with the Premio Lo Nuestro Award for Excellence. Puerto Rican singer Arcángel received the Premio Lo Nuestro Urban Icon Award and Mexican group Los Bukis received the Musical Legacy Award. Spanish composer, performer and producer Manolo Díaz was feted with the Premio Lo Nuestro Visionary Award.

== Performances ==
Below is the list of the live performances of the artists and the songs they performed.

Artist(s)	Performed
Sech	"Novio No"
Lunay	"Ojalá"
Marc Anthony & Nathy Peluso	"Como en el idilio"
Matisse & Cristian Castro	"Conmigo Sin Ti"
Gloria Trevi	"Un Abrazo"
Maluma & Kany García	"1+1"
Carín León	"Lado Frágil"
Tokischa	"Ridin" / "Miami"
Carlos Vives	"Te Dedico"
Rawayana & Elena Rose	"Luna de Miel" / "Naguará"
Mau y Ricky & Kapo	"Te Quiero"
Arcángel & Feid	"Mírame Baby"
Jhayco, J Balvin, Jay Wheeler, Mora, Sech & Eladio Carrión	"Pa Que La Pases Bien" / "Ganas De Ti" / "Por Amar a Ciegas" / "Hace Mucho Tiempo" / "Me Prefieres A Mí" / "Flow Violento"
Ha*Ash & María José	"Te Apuesto"
Romeo Santos & Prince Royce	"Lokita Por Mi" / "Dardos"
Codiciado	"Déjame Dormir"
MAR	"Bebiendo Lágrimas"
Santos Bravos	"Kawasaki"
Xavi	"No Capea" / "La Morrita"
Juanes	"Hagamos Que" / "La Camisa Negra" / "Es Por Ti" / "Nada Valgo Sin Tu Amor" / "A Dios Le Pido"
María Becerra	"Hace Calor"
Café Quijano, Mau y Ricky & Melody	Homage to Manolo Díaz: "La Moto" / "Hay que venir al sur" / "Black is Black"
Silvestre Dangond & Sebastián Yatra	"Una Vaina Bien"
Sebastián Yatra & Gente De Zona	"Canción Para Regresar"
Thalía	"Dancing Queen"
Sofía Reyes, Yami Safdie, Elena Rose & Arthur Hanlon	Paloma San Basilio's recognition: "Luna de Miel" / "Cariño Mío" / "Beso a beso... dulcemente"
Ryan Castro, Kybba, Kapo, Gangsta & J Balvin	"La Villa" / "Ba Bad Bad Remix" / "Tonto"

== Winners and nominees ==
The nominees for Premio Lo Nuestro 2026 were revealed on January 13, 2026, through Billboard’s website.

Winners appear first and highlighted in bold.

=== General ===
Premio Lo Nuestro Artist of the Year	Song of the Year
**Bad Bunny**; Beéle; Carín León; Fuerza Regida; Karol G; Maluma; Marc Anthony; Rauw Alejandro; Romeo Santos; Shakira	**“DTMF” – Bad Bunny**; “Desde Hoy” – Natti Natasha; “El Amor De Mi Herida” – Carín León; “Imagínate” – Danny Ocean & Kapo; “Khé?” – Rauw Alejandro & Romeo Santos; “Latina Foreva” – Karol G; “Me Jalo” – Fuerza Regida & Grupo Frontera; “No Me Sé Rajar” – Alejandro Fernández; “Otra Noche” – Myke Towers & Darell; “Soltera” – Shakira
Album of the Year	Best Female Combination
**Debí Tirar Más Fotos – Bad Bunny**; ¿Y Ahora Qué +? – Alejandro Sanz; 111xpantia – Fuerza Regida; Babylon Club – Danny Ocean; Cosa Nuestra – Rauw Alejandro; Eterno – Prince Royce; Island Boyz – Myke Towers; La Ciudad – Alleh & Yorghaki; Palabra De To's (Seca) – Carín León; Tropicoqueta – Karol G	**“Brujería” – Yuridia & Majo Aguilar**; “Amiga Date Cuenta” – Ha*Ash & Thalia; “Blackout” – Emilia, Tini & Nicki Nicole; “De Maravisha” – Tokischa & Nathy Peluso; “En 4” – Kenia Os & Anitta; “En Tu Marea” – Goyo & Greeicy; “FKN Movie” – Karol G & Mariah Angeliq; “Maldita Billetera” – Alicia Villarreal & Lila Downs; “Maldita Primavera” – Yuri & Ángela Aguilar; “Pa’ Qué Volviste?” – Elena Rose & Maria Becerra
Crossover Collaboration of the Year	The Perfect Mix of the Year
**“Lost In Translation” – Carín León & Kacey Musgraves**; “Ba Ba Bad Remix” – Kybba, Sean Paul, Ryan Castro & Busy Signal; “I Adore You” – Hugel, J Balvin, Ellie Goulding Ft. Topic, Arash & Daecolm; “No Hay Break” – Myke Towers Ft. Omah Lay; “Now Or Never” – Bon Jovi & Pitbull; “São Paulo” – The Weeknd & Anitta	**“Que Me Quiera Ma’” – Marc Anthony & Wisin**; “Carteras Chinas” – Elena Rose, Camilo & Los Ángeles Azules; “Coleccionando Heridas” – Karol G & Marco Antonio Solís; “El Vino De Tu Boca” – Alejandro Sanz & Carín León; “Khé?” – Rauw Alejandro & Romeo Santos; “Misterio” – J Balvin & Gilberto Santa Rosa; “Sabes Qué Hora Es” – Banda Los Sebastianes De Saúl Plata & Luis Fonsi; “Sin Ti” – Morat & Jay Wheeler; “Súfrale” – Grupo Firme & Gloria Trevi; “Weltita” – Bad Bunny & Chuwi
Tour of the Year	Male New Artist of the Year
**Las Mujeres Ya No Lloran World Tour – Shakira**; Cosa Nuestra World Tour – Rauw Alejandro; De Rey A Rey – Alejandro Fernández; Más Cerca De Ti Tour – Marco Antonio Solís; No Me Quiero Ir De Aquí Residencia – Bad Bunny; Vivir Sin Aire Tour – Maná	**Roa**; Alleh; Clave Especial; Esaú Ortiz; Juan Duque; Hamilton; La Cruz; Macario Martínez; Santos Bravos; Yorghaki
Female New Artist of the Year	Christian Music — Song of the Year
**Camila Fernández**; Aria Bela; Delilah; Estevie; MAR; Paloma Morphy; Yailin La Mas Viral; Yeri Mua; Ysa C; Zoe Gotusso	**“Sonríele” – Daddy Yankee**; “Alabaré” – Nacho, Redimi2 & Alex Zurdo; “La Respuesta” – Gocho; “Ponte Bonita (Remix)” – Yaronk Rouse & Rosalina; “Si Volviera Jesús” – Víctor Manuelle; “Todo Va Estar Bien” – Barak, Tercer Cielo & Juan Carlos Rodriguez
AfroBeats of the Year	—
**“Soleao” – Myke Towers & Quevedo**; “Bien Pedos” – Xavi & Kapo; “Cosita Linda” – Elena Rose & Justin Quiles; “La Plena (W Sound 5)” – W Sound, Beéle & Ovy On The Drums; “Me Pasa (Piscis)” – Bomba Estéreo, Rawayana & Astropical; “Mi Reina” – Hamilton & Nanpa Básico; “San Blas” – Boza; “Sanka” – Ryan Castro & Dongo	-

=== Urban ===
Urban – Male Artist of the Year	Urban – Female Artist of the Year
**Bad Bunny**; Arcángel; Beéle; Eladio Carrión; Feid; J Balvin; Myke Towers; Rauw Alejandro; Wisin; Yandel	**Karol G**; Anitta; Bad Gyal; Fariana; Natti Natasha; Rainao; Tokischa; Yailin La Mas Viral; Yeri Mua; Young Miko
Urban – Song of the Year	Urban – Best Trap/Hip-Hop Song of the Year
**“Latina Foreva” – Karol G**; “Ba Ba Bad Remix” – Kybba, Sean Paul, Ryan Castro & Busy Signal; “Daddy Yankee: Bzrp Music Sessions, Vol.0/66” – Bizarrap & Daddy Yankee; “Hablame Claro” – Yandel & Feid; “La Plena (W Sound 5)” – W Sound, Beéle & Ovy On The Drums; “Lo Caro Y Lo Bueno” – Chencho Corleone; “Qué Pasaría…” – Rauw Alejandro & Bad Bunny; “Rio” – J Balvin; “Romeo” – Anitta; “Soleao” – Myke Towers & Quevedo	**“Bum Bum” – El Alfa, Jon Z & Alofoke Music**; “Cuando No Era Cantante” – El Bogueto & Yung Beef; “Duro Ma” – Bryant Myers, Dei V & Saiko; “En La City” – Trueno & Young Miko; “Flash Foto” – Arcángel & Neutro Shorty; “Love” – Clarent; “Nueva Era” – Duki & Myke Towers; “Primer Lugar” – Eladio Carrión & Omar Court; “Tokischa Rmx” – J Castle, Hades66, Ñengo Flow & Tokischa; “Yogurcito Remix” – Blessd, Anuel Aa, Yan Block, Luar La L, Kris R & ROA
Urban – Collaboration of the Year	Best Dembow Song
**“+57” – Karol G, Feid, Dfzm, Ovy On The Drums, J Balvin, Maluma, Ryan Castro, Blessd**; “Amg” – Eladio Carrión & Young Miko; “Doblexxó” – J Balvin & Feid; “La Plena (W Sound 5)” – W Sound, Beéle & Ovy On The Drums; “Luna” – Wisin & Kapo; “Otra Noche (Feat. Darell)” – Myke Towers & Darell; “Perfumito Nuevo” – Bad Bunny & Rainao; “Portate Bien” – Anuel Aa, Blessd & Ovy On The Drums; “Wells Fargo” – Arcángel, Yandel, Ñengo Flow & De La Ghetto; “Woahh” – Rvssian, Young Miko, Omar Courtz Ft. Clarent	**“Dem Bow” – Natti Natasha, Nando Boom & Dímelo Flow**; “Bing Bong” – Yailin La Mas Viral & Puyalo Pantera; “Celos” – Tokischa & Bulin 47; “Pa Que Lo Bailes (Bailalo Rocky)” – Lomiiel; “Quita Y Pone” – El Alfa & Fariana
Urban – Album of the Year	—
**Ferxxo Vol X: Sagrado – Feid**; Borondo – Beéle; Don Kbrn – Eladio Carrión; El Sobreviviente WWW – Wisin; Elyte – Yandel; Island Boyz – Myke Towers; Lo Mismo De Siempre – Mora; Sendé – Ryan Castro; Sr. Santos II Sueños De Grandeza – Arcángel; Underwater – Fariana	

=== Pop ===
Pop – Male Artist of the Year	Pop – Female Artist of the Year
**Maluma**; Alejandro Sanz; Camilo; Danny Ocean; Juanes; Manuel Turizo; Marco Antonio Solís; Pitbull; Ricardo Arjona; Sebastián Yatra	**Cazzu**; Aitana; Elena Rose; Emilia; Gloria Trevi; Kany García; Kenia Os; Laura Pausini; Shakira; Yami Safdie
Pop/Rock – Group or Duo of the Year	Pop – Song of the Year
**Ha*Ash**; Ca7riel & Paco Amoroso; Dnd I Do Not Disturb; Matisse; Latin Mafia; Maná; Mau Y Ricky; Morat; Rawayana; Reik	**“Con Otra” – Cazzu**; “Bronceador” – Maluma; “El Cielo Te Mandó Para Mi” – Ha*Ash; “La Carretera” – Pedro Capó; “La Pelirroja” – Sebastián Yatra; “Mientes” – Reik; “Noviogangsta <3” – Emilia; “Palmeras En El Jardín” – Alejandro Sanz; “Soltera” – Shakira; “Un Beso Menos” – Elena Rose & Morat
Pop – Collaboration of the Year	Pop/Ballad – Song of the Year
**“Bésame” – Alejandro Sanz & Shakira**; “Abrázame” – Ángela Aguilar & Felipe Botello Y El Sonoro Rugir; “Accidente” – Jesse & Joy & Elsa Y Elmar; “Bunda” – Emilia & Luísa Sonza; “Conmigo Sin Ti” – Matisse & Cristian Castro; “Huir” – Kany García & Lia Kali; “La Del Primer Puesto” – Reik & Xavi; “Se Fue” – Rauw Alejandro & Laura Pausini; “Si Tuviera Que Elegir” – Ricardo Montaner, Camilo & Evaluna Montaner; “Sin Ti” – Morat & Jay Wheeler	**“Querida Yo” – Yami Safdie & Camilo**; “Alguien” – Carlos Rivera; “Cueste Lo Que Cueste” – Gloria Trevi; “El Reclamo” – Olga Tañón; “Tierra Mía” – Kany García; “Mujer” – Ricardo Arjona
Pop – Album of the Year	Pop/Urban – Collaboration of the Year
**Ya Es Mañana – Morat**; Cuarto Azul – Aitana; El Vuelo – Gloria Trevi; En Las Nubes (Con Mis Panas) – Elena Rose; Haashville – Ha*Ash; La Carretera – Pedro Capó; Milagro – Sebastián Yatra; Noches De Cantina – Maná; Preguntas A Las 11:11 – Ela Taubert; ¿Qué Significa El Amor? – Carlos Rivera	**“Que Haces” – Becky G & Manuel Turizo**; “2 AM” – Sebastián Yatra & Bad Gyal; “Samaná” – Mau Y Ricky, Danny Ocean & Yorghaki; “Tamo Bien” – Enrique Iglesias, Pitbull & Iamchino; “Te Acuerdas?” – Dnd I Do Not Disturb & R!Ch Yashel; “Volver” – Piso 21, Marc Anthony & Beéle
Pop/Urban – Song of the Year	Pop/Rock – Song of the Year
**“DTMF” – Bad Bunny**; “6 De Febrero” – Aitana; “A.K.A” – Mari La Carajita; “Cables Cruzados” – Farruko; “Carita Linda” – Rauw Alejandro; “Cosas Pendientes” – Maluma; “Sirenita” – Ozuna; “Tengo Celos” – Myke Towers; “Tocando El Cielo” – Luis Fonsi; “Una Como Tu” – Jay Wheeler	**“Vivir Sin Aire” – Maná & Carín León**; “¿Es En Serio?” – Ela Taubert; “Me Toca A Mí” – Morat & Camilo; “Sabe Bien” – Pedro Capó; “Una Noche Contigo” – Juanes
Pop/Urban – Best EuroSong	—
**“6 De Febrero” – Aitana**; “Da Me” – Bad Gyal; “Esa diva” – Melody; “Moja1ta” – Lola Indigo; “Quiero Decirte” – Abraham Mateo & Ana Mena; “Tatami” – JC Reyes; “Tuchat” – Quevedo; “Tu Vas Sin (Fav)” – Rels B	

=== Tropical ===
Tropical – Artist of the Year	Tropical – Song of the Year
**Romeo Santos**; Carlos Vives; Elvis Crespo; Gloria Estefan; Jerry Rivera; Luis Figueroa; Marc Anthony; Olga Tañón; Prince Royce; Silvestre Dangond	**“Tú Con Él” – Rauw Alejandro**; “Desde Hoy” – Natti Natasha; “Fuera De Lugar” – Venesti; “Hello, What’s Up” – Christian Alicea; “How Deep Is Your Love” – Prince Royce; “La Indiferencia” – Silvestre Dangond & Fonseca; “Malportada” – Nathy Peluso & Rawayana; “Más Que Un Beso” – Luis Figueroa; “Por Si Te Me Vas” – Olga Tañón & Lenny Tavárez; “Raíces” – Gloria Estefan
Tropical – Collaboration of the Year	Tropical – Album of the Year
**“Café Con Ron” – Bad Bunny & Los Pleneros De La Cresta**; “En Privado” – Xavi & Manuel Turizo; “La Diferente” – Lenier & Gente De Zona; “La Tierra Del Olvido (Versión Salsa)” – Carlos Vives & Grupo Niche; “Me Muevo” – Fariana & Kiko El Crazy; “Nuestra Canción” – Elvis Crespo & Jerry Rivera; “Repetimos” – Arthur Hanlon, Yotuel & Darell; “Venga Lo Que Venga” – Fonseca & Rawayana; “Vestido Rojo” – Silvestre Dangond & Emilia; “Volver (La Salsa)” – Piso 21, Beéle & Marc Anthony	**Natti Natasha En Amargue – Natti Natasha**; Debut Y Segunda Tanda, Vol. 2 – Gilberto Santa Rosa; El Último Baile – Silvestre Dangond & Juancho De La Espriella; Escalona Nunca Se Había Grabado Así (Deluxe) – Carlos Vives; Eterno – Prince Royce; Gris – Luis Figueroa; Llegué Yo – Jerry Rivera; Poeta Herío – Elvis Crespo; Raíces – Gloria Estefan; Reparto By Gente De Zona – Gente De Zona

=== Mexican Music ===
Mexican Music – Male Artist of the Year	Mexican Music – Female Artist of the Year
**Carín León**; Alejandro Fernández; Christian Nodal; Eden Muñoz; Ivan Cornejo; Luis Angel “El Flaco”; Netón Vega; Oscar Maydon; Pepe Aguilar; Xavi	**Majo Aguilar**; Aida Cuevas; Ana Bárbara; Angela Leiva; Ángela Aguilar; Camila Fernández; Carolina Ross; Chiquis; Lupita Infante; Yuridia
Mexican Music – Group or Duo of the Year	Mexican Music – Song of the Year
**Julión Álvarez Y Su Norteño Banda**; Banda El Recodo; Banda Los Sebastianes De Saúl Plata; Fuerza Regida; Grupo Firme; Grupo Frontera; Intocable; La Arrolladora Banda El Limón De René Camacho; Los Ángeles Azules; Los Tigres Del Norte	**“El Amor De Mi Herida” – Carín León**; “Amor Bonito” – Luis Angel “El Flaco”; “El Amigo” – Christian Nodal; “Hija De Papi” – Xavi & Netón Vega; “Hecha Pa’ Mi” – Grupo Frontera; “Loco” – Netón Vega; “Me Prometí” – Ivan Cornejo; “Otro Capítulo” – Becky G; “Por Esos Ojos” – Fuerza Regida; “Traigo Saldo Y Ganas De Rogar” – Eden Muñoz
Mexican Music – Collaboration of the Year	Banda Song of the Year
**“Si Tú Me Vieras” – Carín León & Maluma**; “300 Noches” – Belinda & Natanael Cano; “Crisis” – Becky G & Tito Double P; “En Tiempo Y Forma (Juntos)” – Josi Cuen & Jorge Medina; “Lo Que No Saben” – Calibre 50 & Los De La Noria; “Me Jalo” – Fuerza Regida Y Grupo Frontera; “Morena” – Netón Vega & Peso Pluma; “Tu Tu Tu” – Clave Especial & Edgardo Nuñez; “Un Bendito Día” – Yuridia & Alejandro Fernández; “Yo Me Lo Busqué” – Los Ángeles Azules & Thalia	**“El Beneficio De La Duda” – Grupo Firme**; “Amor Bonito” – Luis Angel “El Flaco”; “Una Historia Mal Contada” – La Arrolladora Banda El Limón De René Camacho; “Una Peda Menos” – Banda Los Recoditos; “Voy A Levantarme” – Banda Los Sebastianes De Saúl Plata
Mariachi/Ranchera Song of the Year	Norteño Song of the Year
**“Sin Llorar” – Yuridia**; “Amé” – Christian Nodal; “Amémonos De Nuevo” – Lupita Infante & Leonardo Aguilar; “Cuídamela Bien” – Pepe Aguilar; “Nadie Se Va Como Llegó” – Ángela Aguilar; “No Me Sé Rajar” – Alejandro Fernández	**“Rey Sin Reina” – Julión Álvarez Y Su Norteño Banda**; “Chelas Y Besos” – La Fiera De Ojinaga; “La Lotería” – Los Tigres Del Norte; “Me Gusta Mi Vida” – Intocable; “Mi Lugar Favorito” – Eden Muñoz
Mexican Music – Fusion of the Year	Mexican Music – Best Electro Corrido
**“No Capea” – Xavi & Grupo Frontera**; “2+2” – Omar Camacho & Victor Mendivil; “Loco” – Netón Vega; “Marlboro Rojo” – Fuerza Regida; “Tu Tu Tu” – Clave Especial & Edgardo Nuñez	**“Triple Lavada Remix” – Esaú Ortiz, Luis R Conriquez, Oscar Maydon, Alemán Ft. Victor Mendivil**; “Bachata Bélica” – Los Esquivel, Prince Royce & Brray; “Corridos Y Alcohol” – Steve Aoki & Oscar Maydon; “La Fiesta” – Luis R Conriquez, José Guicho & Tito Double P; “Tierno” – Joaquin Medina & Codiciado
Mexican Music – Album of the Year	—
**Sin Llorar – Yuridia**; ¿Quién + Como Yo? – Christian Nodal; 111xpantia – Fuerza Regida; De Rey A Rey (En Vivo Desde La Plaza De Toros La México, 2024) – Alejandro Fernández; Eden – Eden Muñoz; Encuentros – Becky G; La Lotería – Los Tigres Del Norte; Next – Xavi; Palabra De To's (Seca) – Carín León; Voy A Levantarme – Banda Los Sebastianes De Saúl Plata	
