= XOXO (CNCO album) =

Studio album by CNCO
- Released: August 26, 2022
- Genre: Reggaeton; Latin pop
- Length: 36:30
- Language: Spanish
- Label: Sony Music Latin
- Producer: Los Legendarios; Richi Lopez; Daramola; Rafael Rodriguez; Zabdiel De Jesús; Edgar Barrera; Golden Mindz; Kairo La Sinfonia; Danny Felix

CNCO chronology
| Déjà Vu (2021) | XOXO (2022) |

Singles from XOXO
- 1. "Toa La Noche" Released: June 22, 2021; 2. "Party, Humo & Alcohol" Released: January 13, 2022; 3. "La Equivocada" Released: April 8, 2022; 4. "No Apagues la Luz" Released: June 23, 2022; 5. "La Equivocada (Versión Tumbao)" Released: June 23, 2022; 6. "Plutón" Released: July 20, 2022; 7. "Miami" Released: August 24, 2022

XOXO is the fourth and final studio album by Latin American boyband CNCO, released on August 26, 2022, by Sony Music Latin. It contains the genres of reggaeton and Latin pop, with lyrics about partying, heartbreak, romance, and sex. Co-written almost entirely by the group's members, the album features vocals from Kenia Os, Adriel Favela, Beéle, and contributions from several producers such as Los Legendarios, Richi López, and the band's own Zabdiel de Jesús. XOXO is the boyband's last album before their disbandment, announced in July 2022.

The lead single "Toa La Noche" was released on June 22, 2021, marking their first song as a quartet. The second single "Party, Humo & Alcohol" was released in January 2022, followed by "La Equivocada" in April. The fourth and fifth singles, "No Apagues la Luz", and "La Equivocada (Versión Tumbao)" with Favela, were released simultaneously on June 23. "Plutón" with Kenia Os was released in July, and the seventh and final single "Miami" with Beéle, was released on August 24.

The group announced their farewell tour, titled La Ultima Cita, to promote the album and also performed previous material. The concert series spanned throughout the Americas.

== Background ==
On October 11, 2019, they released their debut EP Que Quienes Somos. The project saw the group gain creative control over their music, co-writing most of the EP. The band announced their third concert tour, Press Start, which was set to begin in 2020, but was cancelled due to the COVID-19 pandemic. During quarantine, the group recorded their cover album Déjà Vu, released in February 2021. During May, member Joel Pimentel announced his departure from the group, with his final day being their live virtual performance on May 14. The remaining members stated that they would continue as a quartet.

== Release and promotion ==
On July 22, 2021, CNCO performed "Toa La Noche" at Premios Juventud. The next year, they performed "Party, Humo & Alcohol" at Premio Lo Nuestro on February 24, where they won the awards for Pop Album of the Year for Déjà Vu, Pop Song for "Tan Enamorados" and Pop Group or Duo. On April 21, the group appeared at the Latin American Music Awards of 2022, performing "La Equivocada", where they also received the Favorite Pop Album award. They performed "Plutón" at the 2022 Premios Juventud ceremony, which took place in July 21, with the last-minute absence of Kenia OS, due to the singer testing positive for COVID-19. While accepting the award for Best Fandom during the ceremony, de Jesús announced that the band would split up in a year and half.

After the event, the group posted photos on their social media showing the members wearing jackets spelling out the album's title in red letters. XOXO was released on August 26, the sixth-year anniversary of CNCO's first album Primera Cita (First Date). The band embarked on their final tour, La Última Cita Tour (The Last Date), which started on May 12 in Lima, Peru.

== Track listing ==
Track listing and credits adapted from Apple Music.

| No. | Title | Writer(s) | Length |
|---|---|---|---|
| 1. | "Malvada" | Alexis Gotay; Christopher Vélez Muñoz; Erick Brian Colón; Jeremy Osvaldo Ruiz Casanova; Jose Cotto; Juan Luis Morera Luna; Marcos A. Ramírez Carrasquillo; Matias Sebastian Santucho; Richard Camacho; Víctor Rafael Torres Betancourt; Zabdiel De Jesús | 2:52 |
| 2. | "Plutón" (with Kenia Os) | Vélez Muñoz; Colón; Isaac "Izaak" Ortiz Geronimo; Kenia Guadalupe Flores Osuna; Camacho; Richi Lopez; Simon Buritica; De Jesús | 2:45 |
| 3. | "Miami" (featuring Beéle) | Abraham "Daramola" Olaleye; Brandon De Jesús López Orozco; Vélez Muñoz; Diego L. Vélez Márquez; Edgar Semper; Colón; Fernando Daniel Morillo Rivas; Luian Malavé; Camacho; Xavier Semper; De Jesús | 3:45 |
| 4. | "No Se Va" | Christian A. Linares; Vélez Muñoz; Colón; Cotto; Morera Luna; Ramírez Carrasquillo; Santucho; Camacho; Torres Betancourt; De Jesús | 3:29 |
| 5. | "La Duda" | Andrea Elena Mangiamarchi; Vélez Muñoz; Colón; Camacho; De Jesús | 2:59 |
| 6. | "No Apagues la Luz" | Vélez Muñoz; Colón; Omar Sabino; Ricardo Lopez; Camacho; De Jesús | 3:12 |
| 7. | "Sábanas Mojadas" | Linares; Vélez Muñoz; Colón; Cotto; Morera Luna; Ramírez Carrasquillo; Camacho; Torres Betancourt; De Jesús | 3:22 |
| 8. | "Toa La Noche" | Linares; Vélez Muñoz; Colón; Jean Rodriguez; Cotto; Morera Luna; Ramírez Carrasquillo; Camacho; Torres Betancourt; De Jesús | 3:18 |
| 9. | "La Equivocada" | Andrés Mauricio Acosta; Luis Barrera Jr.; Santiago Munera Penagos | 3:18 |
| 10. | "Party, Humo & Alcohol" | Vélez Muñoz; Colón; Helder "Hv" Vilas Boas; José Alberto Roble Ramírez (Kairo La Sinfonía); Camacho; De Jesús | 3:36 |
| 11. | "La Equivocada - Versión Tumbao" (with Adriel Favela) | Acosta; Edgar Barrera; Barrera Jr.; Munera Penagos | 3:50 |
| Total length: | | | 36:30 |

== La Última Cita Tour ==
La Última Cita Tour
- Tour by CNCO
- Associated album: XOXO; Déjà Vu; Primera Cita; CNCO; Qué Quiénes Somos
- Start date: May 12, 2023
- End date: November 17, 2023
- Legs: 2
- No. of shows: 14 in Latin America; 26 in North America; 40 in total

CNCO concert chronology
- Toa La Noche Club Tour (2021); La Última Cita Tour

CNCO embarked on their La Última Cita Tour, to promote the album. It was set to begin on May 9 in La Paz, Bolivia, but due to logistical issues, it was postponed and rescheduled for July, alongside the concert for May 10 in Santa Cruz. The tour began on May 12, 2023, in Lima, Peru visiting various cities throughout Latin America and the US, ending on November 17, at the Coca-Cola Music Hall in San Juan, Puerto Rico.

=== Set list ===
This set list is representative of the concert on May 12, 2023 in Lima, Peru. It does not represent all concerts for the duration of the tour.

1. "Reggaetón Lento (Bailemos)"
2. "Ya Tú Sabes"
3. "Se Vuelve Loca"
4. "Quisiera"
5. "De Cero"
6. "Bonita"
7. "Para Enamorarte"
8. "Mi Medicina"
9. "Mamita"
10. "Tu Luz"
11. "Cien"
12. "Por Amarte Así"
13. "Entra En Mi Vida"
14. "Dejaría Todo"
15. "Tan Enamorados"
16. "Primera Cita"
17. "No Se Va"
18. "La Equivocada"
19. "Amor Narcotico"
20. "La Ley"
21. "La Última Canción"
22. "Tan Fácil"
23. "Party, Humo y Alcohol"
24. "Llegaste Tú"
25. "No Apagues La Luz
26. "Toa La Noche"
27. "Miami"
28. "Pegao"
29. "Plutón"
30. "Hey DJ"

=== Shows ===
| Date | City | Country | Venue | Ref. |
| South America | | | | |
|---|---|---|---|---|
| May 12, 2023 | Lima | Peru | Circuito Mágico del Agua | |
| May 13, 2023 | José Luis Bustamante | Peru | Beer garden | |
| May 16, 2023 | Santiago | Chile | Movistar Arena | |
| May 19, 2023 | Bogotá | Colombia | Movistar Arena | |
| North America | | | | |
| June 3, 2023 | Los Angeles | United States | Peacock Theater | |
| June 4, 2023 | San Diego | United States | San Diego Civic Theatre | |
| June 9, 2023 | Indio | United States | Fantasy Springs Resort Casino | |
| June 16, 2023 | Grand Prairie, Texas | United States | Texas Trust CU Theatre | |
| June 17, 2023 | Houston | United States | Arena Theatre | |
| June 22, 2023 | Rosemont | United States | Rosemont Theatre | |
| South America | | | | |
| June 29, 2023 | Quito | Ecuador | Coliseo General Rumiñahui | |
| June 30, 2023 | Cuenca | Ecuador | Coliseo Jefferson Perez Quezada | |
| July 1, 2023 | Guayaquil | Ecuador | Coliseo Voltaire Paladines Polo | |
| July 5, 2023 | São Paulo | Brazil | Audio | |
| July 7, 2023 | Villa Crespo | Argentina | Movistar Arena | |
| July 8, 2023 | Rosario | Argentina | Teatro El Círculo | |
| July 9, 2023 | Córdoba | Argentina | Quality Espacio | |
| July 11, 2023 | Maipú | Argentina | Arena Maipú | |
| July 14, 2023 | San Miguel de Tucumán | Argentina | Mercedes Sosa Theater | |
| July 15, 2023 | Asunción | Paraguay | SND Arena | |
| July 22, 2023 | Santa Cruz de la Sierra | Bolivia | Sonilum Arena | |
| July 23, 2023 | La Paz | Bolivia | Outdoor Theater | |
| North America | | | | |
| July 28, 2023 | Lake Buena Vista | United States | House of Blues | |
| July 29, 2023 | Miami | United States | Oasis Wynwood | |
| August 26, 2023 | Guácima | Costa Rica | Parque Viva | |
| September 1, 2023 | Zapopan | Mexico | Telmex Auditorium | |
| September 6, 2023 | Mexico City | Mexico | Auditorio Nacional | |
| September 8, 2023 | Hermosillo | Mexico | Hipódromo de Hermosillo | |
| September 9, 2023 | Tijuana | Mexico | Audiorama El Trompo | |
| September 21, 2023 | Santiago de Querétaro | Mexico | Auditorio Josefa Ortiz de Domínguez | |
| September 22, 2023 | Puebla | Mexico | Arena GNP Seguros | |
| September 24, 2023 | Mérida | Mexico | Foro GNP | |
| October 4, 2023 | Monterrey | Mexico | Auditorio Citibanamex | |
| October 5, 2023 | León | Mexico | Velaria de la Feria | |
| October 6, 2023 | San Luis Potosí | Mexico | El Domo | |
| October 7, 2023 | Toluca | Mexico | Teatro Morelos | |
| October 11, 2023 | Panama City | Panama | Islas de Atlapa | |
| October 13, 2023 | Nuevo Cuscatlán | El Salvador | BeSport | |
| October 14, 2023 | Guatemala City | Guatemala | Forum Majadas | |
| October 15, 2023 | Tegucigalpa | Honduras | Ingenieros Coliseum | |
| October 29, 2023 | Caracas | Venezuela | Hotel Eurobuilding | |
| November 17, 2023 | San Juan | Puerto Rico | Coca-Cola Music Hall | |
