= Ya Borracho =

2025 song by Herencia de Grandes

Song by Herencia de Grandes

from the album Noches Sin Fin
- Released: November 7, 2025
- Genre: Regional Mexican
- Length: 2:38
- Label: Rancho Humilde
- Songwriter: Axel Terrazas
- Producers: Jesus Ivan Rubio Beltran; Jimmy Humilde

Music video
- "Ya Borracho" on YouTube

"Ya Borracho" is a song by regional Mexican band Herencia de Grandes, released on November 7, 2025 from their seventh studio album, Noches Sin Fin. The lyrics depict the protagonist drunkenly confessing his feelings for his romantic interest.

== Charts ==
Chart performance for "Ya Borracho"
Chart (2025–2026)	Peak position
Global 200 (Billboard)	75
Mexico (Billboard)	2
US Bubbling Under Hot 100 (Billboard)	1
US Hot Latin Songs (Billboard)	6
US Hot Regional Mexican Songs (Billboard)	1
