= La Plena (W Sound 05) =

2025 single by W Sound, Beéle and Ovy on the Drums

Single by W Sound, Beéle and Ovy on the Drums
- Released: February 19, 2025
- Recorded: 2024
- Genre: Afrobeats; Latin pop
- Length: 2:30
- Label: Kristoman; Warner Music Latina
- Songwriters: Brandon López; Daniel Echavarría; Diego León; Cristian Salazar
- Producer: Ovy on the Drums

W Sound singles chronology
"SQ (W Sound 04)" (2024)	"La Plena (W Sound 05)" (2025)	"Chao Despechao" (2025)

Beéle singles chronology
"Pienso" (2025)	"La Plena (W Sound 05)" (2025)	"Sobelove" (2025)

Ovy on the Drums singles chronology
"Guao Guao" (2025)	"La Plena (W Sound 05)" (2025)	"Oh, Baby!" (2025)

Music video
- "La Plena (W Sound 05)" on YouTube

"La Plena (W Sound 05)" is a single by Colombian online streamer W Sound, Colombian singer Beéle and Colombian record producer Ovy on the Drums. It was released on February 19, 2025 and is an Afrobeats-infused song.

== Promotion ==
After the song was released, Beéle uploaded a video of himself dancing to it on TikTok, inspiring a popular dance challenge. By the end of April 2025, over 600,000 videos for the challenge have been created.

== Chart performance ==
"La Plena (W Sound 05)" is W Sound's first song to enter the Billboard Argentina Hot 100, debuting at No. 39 as the Hot Shot Debut of the week. In the week ending on May 17, 2025, it became the first number-one entry on the chart for all three artists.

== Charts ==
=== Weekly charts ===
Weekly chart performance
Chart (2025)	Peak position
Argentina Hot 100 (Billboard)	1
Bolivia (Billboard)	1
Chile (Billboard)	1
Colombia (Colombia Hot 100)	4
Costa Rica (FONOTICA)	1
Ecuador (Billboard)	1
France (SNEP)	195
Global 200 (Billboard)	11
Italy (FIMI)	2
Luxembourg (Billboard)	16
Netherlands (Single Top 100)	67
Peru (Billboard)	1
Portugal (AFP)	3
Spain (PROMUSICAE)	1
Switzerland (Schweizer Hitparade)	7
US Bubbling Under Hot 100 (Billboard)	14
US Hot Latin Songs (Billboard)	9

=== Year-end charts ===
Year-end chart performance
Chart (2025)	Position
Chile Airplay (Monitor Latino)	8
El Salvador Airplay (ASAP EGC)	7
Global 200 (Billboard)	44
Italy (FIMI)	7
Switzerland (Schweizer Hitparade)	35
US Hot Latin Songs (Billboard)	29

== Certifications ==
Certifications
Region	Certification	Certified units/sales
Canada (Music Canada)	Gold	40,000^{‡}
France (SNEP)	Gold	100,000^{‡}
Italy (FIMI)	2× Platinum	400,000^{‡}
Portugal (AFP)	4× Platinum	100,000^{‡}
Spain (Promusicae)	9× Platinum	900,000^{‡}
United States (RIAA)	8× Platinum (Latin)	480,000^{‡}
Streaming
Chile (PROFOVI)	Gold	9,600,000
^{‡} Sales+streaming figures based on certification alone.
