= Algo Tú =

Single by Shakira and Beéle
- Released: 4 March 2026
- Genre: Latin pop
- Length: 3:33
- Label: Sony Music Latin; 5020 Records
- Songwriters: Shakira; Keityn; Beéle; Súper Dakis; Flambo; Alexander "A.C." Castillo
- Producers: Alexander "A.C." Castillo; Flambo; Shakira; Beéle

Shakira singles chronology
"Zoo" (2025)	"Algo Tú" (2026)	"Choka Choka" (2026)

Music video
- "Algo Tú" on YouTube

"Algo Tú" (stylized in all caps as "ALGO TÚ") (English: "Something You") is a song by Colombian singers Shakira and Beéle. Released on March 4, 2026, the track fuses Latin pop with Afro-Latin rhythms and urban and Caribbean sounds, while incorporating traditional Colombian instruments such as the gaita, which serve as a homage to the artists' shared hometown of Barranquilla. It premiered live on 1 March 2026 during Shakira's Las Mujeres Ya No Lloran World Tour at the Zócalo in Mexico City.

== Background ==
The release of "Algo Tú" was announced by Shakira and Beéle on 27 February 2026 on social media, where they posted a video of singing the song's chorus. They performed the song live for an audience of over 400 000 people in Mexico City on March 1 before releasing it officially on 4 March 2026.

On 17 April 2026, an EP with two remixes for the song were released: the Shimza Remix is Afro house with "hypnotic" beats, while the Indira Paganotto Remix is intense techno.

== Composition ==
The lyrics have references to Colombian culture and Colombian musical traditions. Mentioned are the Tayrona National Natural Park on the Caribbean coast: "Una orilla de esas del Tayrona", and the Magdalena River, which flows into the Caribbean Sea near Barranquilla: "Como el Magdalena desemboca, yo quiero / Descansar en tu boca". The lyrics also mention vallenato composer Rafael Escalona: "Voy a hacerte una casa en el aire / Al laíto de la de Escalona", as well as the alegre and llamador drums used in Caribbean coastal genres of Colombia: "Tú yo somos el alegre y el llamador / Somos dos 'Ay, hombre', en un vallenato".

== Accolades ==
"ALGO TÚ"
Year	Ceremony	Award	Result	Ref.
2026	Los 40 Music Awards	Mejor Canción Latina	Pending	

== Reception ==
Eva Vernier from Delta FM noted the song's vibrant, radiant and sunny composition, highlighting how Shakira's distinctive voice blends seamlessly with Beéle's contemporary style to create a duet that feels both fresh and harmoniously connected. FrontView Magazine highlighted the "perfect blend" of Shakira and Beéle's styles on the song, encapsulating it as an "incredible Latin & Afro-fusion hit".

== Music video ==
The music video for "Algo Tú", directed by Jaume de Laiguana, was released on 6 April 2026. Filmed in Barranquilla, it features a variety of locations such as Gran Malecón del Río and the Barrio Abajo Open Air Museum, as well as the carnival troupes of Rumbón Normalista, Son Kalimba and Congo Grande de Barranquilla.

== Charts ==
=== Weekly charts ===
Weekly chart performance
Chart (2026)	Peak position
Argentina Hot 100 (Billboard)	69
Argentina Airplay (Monitor Latino)	1
Bolivia Airplay (Monitor Latino)	6
Central America Airplay (Monitor Latino)	7
Central America + Caribbean Airplay (BMAT)	8
Chile Airplay (Monitor Latino)	7
Colombia Hot 100 (Billboard)	10
Colombia Airplay (Monitor Latino)	3
Colombia Airplay (National-Report)	5
Costa Rica Airplay (FONOTICA)	8
Czech Republic Airplay (ČNS IFPI)	37
Ecuador Pop Airplay (Monitor Latino)	12
El Salvador Airplay (ASAP EGC)	1
France Airplay (SNEP)	14
Guatemala Airplay (Monitor Latino)	5
Honduras Pop Airplay (Monitor Latino)	15
Latin America Latino Airplay (Monitor Latino)	2
Mexico Pop Airplay (Monitor Latino)	5
Nicaragua Pop Airplay (Monitor Latino)	4
Nigeria Bubbling Under Hot 100 (TurnTable)	17
Nigeria Airplay (TurnTable)	79
Panama International (PRODUCE)	5
Panama Airplay (Monitor Latino)	3
Paraguay Airplay (Monitor Latino)	19
Peru Airplay (Monitor Latino)	1
Puerto Rico Airplay (Monitor Latino)	3
Spain (Promusicae)	84
Spain Airplay (Promusicae)	9
Uruguay Airplay (Monitor Latino)	11
US Hot Latin Pop Songs (Billboard)	1
US Hot Latin Songs (Billboard)	26
US Latin Airplay (Billboard)	3
US Latin Pop Airplay (Billboard)	1
Venezuela Airplay (Record Report)	9

=== Monthly charts ===
Monthly chart performance
Chart (2026)	Peak position
Paraguay Airplay (SGP)	26
