= WestCOL =

Colombian streamer (born 2000)

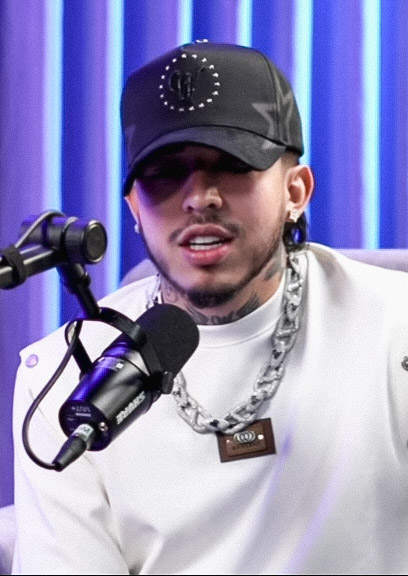
- WestCOL in 2025
- Born: Luis Fernando Villa Álvarez; December 24, 2000 (age 25); Ciudad Bolívar, Antioquia, Colombia
- Education: Tecnológico de Antioquia
- Occupations: Music producer, online streamer
- Years active: 2015–present
- Height: 158 cm (5 ft 2 in)

Kick information
- Channel: Westcol
- Years active: 2023–present
- Genre: Streamer
- Followers: 4.0 million

Twitch information
- Channel: WestCOL
- Years active: 2018–2023
- Genre: Streamer
- Followers: 1.5 million

YouTube information
- Channel: WestCOL
- Years active: 2015–present
- Genre: Streamer
- Subscribers: 2.00 million (August 2026)
- Views: 322 million (July 2025)
- Musical career
- Origin: Medellín, Antioquia
- Genres: Reggaeton; afrobeats
- Occupations: Executive producer; songwriter; singer
- Works: W Sound
- Years active: 2024–present
- Labels: Big Ligas; Warner Latina

Luis Fernando Villa Álvarez (born February 2, 2001), better known by his online alias WestCOL is a Colombian online streamer and executive producer. He became the most followed streamer on Kick in 2024, having risen to fame through his gaming content. His career has been marred by controversies which have garnered media and legal attention. WestCOL is also the organizer of Stream Fighters (es), an amateur boxing event.

== Career ==
Villa began his career as a content creator in 2015, uploading videos to YouTube. In 2018, he transitioned to Twitch, where he gained recognition for streaming games such as "Minecraft" and for "Just Chatting" sessions. By 2023, Villa shifted his primary platform to Kick following Twitch's gambling policy changes. Villa lived in Lake Nona, Florida from 2017 - 2019.

=== Content focus ===
Villa's streams feature content including Minecraft, live audience interactions, and real-life events including his boxing. He took part in the Américas Kings League with his club, West Santos FC, alongside Arcángel.

In October 2025, Villa received an "irrejectable offer" to join the emerging Baller League project, leading to his departure from the Kings League. In December 2025 it was confirmed he would join Baller League USA.

He is also known for his casino streams and collaborations with creators including Adin Ross and Sergio Agüero. Among his collaborations is a joint stream with IShowSpeed, a creator known for energetic and comedic content. Álvarez has a close friendship with Colombian reggaeton artist Blessd, frequently sharing moments with him both online and offline.

== Public image ==
Villa's career has been marred by controversies which have garnered media and legal attention.

In a 2022 video, Villa made violent and discriminatory remarks about LGBT people. He said he would kill his son with seventeen bullets if they were gay, and that he would attack his child with a stick if they were transgender. A citizen sued him for the comments, and the Constitutional Court of Colombia ordered Villa to publish on his social networks a message about the dangers of hate speech and discrimination against LGBT people. The Court also ordered Villa to attend training on LGBT human rights. Villa apologized and said the statements were dark jokes.

On Instagram during the Qatar World Cup, he glorified the lynching of women in the Middle East and made misogynistic comments about women from Pereira, Bucaramanga, Medellin, and Cali.

In 2023 during a livestream he referred to the Colombian city of Ibagué as a "hellhole", said it would never be a significant reference for foreigners, and made other disparaging remarks about the city. Mayor of Ibagué Andrés Hurtado joined the public backlash, declaring Villa "persona non grata". Two lawyers filed legal actions to demand a formal retraction of his statements and called for stricter regulation of online content.

Villa was prohibited from entering El Salvador in 2024 when he attempted to attend Gamergy, an esports and gaming event, after making misogynistic comments during a live stream. He stated, "When I went to El Salvador, I didn't see any attractive women," sparking significant backlash. Yamil Bukele, the president of the National Institute of Sports of El Salvador, announced that Álvarez would be banned from the event, citing the need to uphold the respect and values promoted by Gamergy. Villa defended his comments and refused to apologize.

== Music ==
=== W Sound ===
In 2024, Villa launched a collaborative music project, "W Sound", which combined urban music production with rotating collaborations with artists and producers. Based in Medellín, the project is a partnership between Álvarez and producer Ovy on the Drums, aiming to explore new musical styles within the Latin urban genre. W Sound has been compared to the work of Argentine producer Bizarrap due to its collaborative format and emphasis on visual storytelling. It has drawn criticism for its lyrical content.

=== Discography ===
==== Singles ====
===== As lead artist =====
List of singles as lead artist, with peak chart positions, year of release, and album name
Title	Year	Peak chart positions									Certifications	Album
Title	Year	US Bub.	US Latin	ARG	CHI	COL	ECU	PER	SPA	WW	Certifications	Album
"Soltera (W Sound 01)" (with Blessd and Ovy on the Drums)	2024	—	—	—	22	1	4	22	—	58	RIAA: 2× Platinum (Latin)	Non-album singles
"Mi Novio Tiene Novia (W Sound 02)" (with Valka and Ovy on the Drums)	2024	—	—	—	—	—	—	—	—	—		Non-album singles
"SQ (W Sound 04)" with Ryan Castro and Ovy on the Drums)	2024	—	—	—	—	—	—	—	—	—	RIAA: Gold (Latin)	Non-album singles
"La Plena (W Sound 05)" (with Beéle and Ovy on the Drums)	2025	14	9	1	1	1	1	1	1	11	RIAA: 7× Platinum (Latin)	Non-album singles
"Undercromo (W Sound 06)" (with Ovy on the Drums and Dei V)	2025	7	7	15	8	1	8	9	65	98		Non-album singles
"Chica Galáctica (W Sound 07)" (with Cris MJ and Ovy on the Drums)	2025	—	—	—	—	—	—	—	—	—		Non-album singles
"Pico Y Chao (W Sound 08)" (with Kris R. and Ovy on the Drums)	2026	—	—	—	—	—	—	—	—	—		Non-album singles
"Godzila (W Sound 09)" (with J Balvin and Ovy on the Drums)	2026	—	—	—	—	—	—	—	—	—		Non-album singles
"5 Estrellas (W Sound 23)" (with Myke Towers and Ovy on the Drums)	2026	—	—	—	—	—	—	—	58	—		Non-album singles
"Happy Monday (W Sound 10)" (with Hades66 and Ovy on the Drums)	2026	—	—	—	—	—	—	—	18	—		
"—" denotes that the song did not chart or charting information is unavailable.

== Personal life ==
Villa is based in Medellín, Colombia. He has not confirmed a current relationship and has addressed his past relationship with Colombian influencer Aída Victoria Merlano.

== Awards and nominations ==
Awards	Year	Recipient(s) and nominee(s)	Category	Result	Ref.
Billboard Latin Music Awards	2026	W Sound	Latin Rhythm Artist of the Year, Duo or Group	Pending	
Billboard Latin Music Awards	2026	"La Plena" (with Béele and Ovy on the Drums)	Global 200 Latin Song of the Year	Pending	
Billboard Latin Music Awards	2026	"5 Estrellas" (with Myke Towers and Ovy on the Drums)	Latin Rhythm Song of the Year	Pending	
Heat Latin Music Awards	2025	"La Plena" (with Béele and Ovy on the Drums)	Best Collaboration	Won	
Heat Latin Music Awards	2025	"La Plena" (with Béele and Ovy on the Drums)	Best Viral Song	Won	
Latin Grammy Awards	2025	"La Plena" (with Béele and Ovy on the Drums)	Best Urban/Urban Fusion Performance	Nominated	
Los 40 Music Awards	2025	"La Plena" (with Béele and Ovy on the Drums)	Best Latin Collaboration	Nominated	
Premios Lo Nuestro	2026	"La Plena" (with Béele and Ovy on the Drums)	AfroBeats of the Year	Nominated	
Premios Lo Nuestro	2026	"La Plena" (with Béele and Ovy on the Drums)	Urban Song of the Year	Nominated	
Premios Lo Nuestro	2026	"La Plena" (with Béele and Ovy on the Drums)	Urban Collaboration of the Year	Nominated	
Premios Juventud	2025	"La Plena" (with Béele and Ovy on the Drums)	Best Urban Track	Nominated	
Premios Juventud	2026	"5 Estrellas" (with Myke Towers and Ovy on the Drums)	Best Urban Mix	Nominated	
Premios Nuestra Tierra	2025	"Soltera" (with Blessd and Ovy on the Drums)	Best Urban Collaboration	Nominated	
Premios Nuestra Tierra	2026	"La Plena" (with Béele and Ovy on the Drums)	Best Global Song	Pending	
Premios Tu Música Urbano	2025	"La Plena" (with Béele and Ovy on the Drums)	Top Song - Afrobeat	Nominated	
