= Beéle =

Colombian singer (born 2002)

- Born: Brandon de Jesús López Orozco; 30 September 2002 (age 24); Barranquilla, Atlántico, Colombia
- Genres: Afrobeats; urbano
- Occupations: Singer; songwriter
- Instrument: Vocals
- Years active: 2019–present

Brandon de Jesús López Orozco, known professionally as Beéle, is a Colombian singer from Barranquilla.

Beéle was born and raised in Barranquilla, Colombia. He first started writing songs after discovering "Aye", a 2014 single by Nigerian-American singer Davido. He grew up surrounded with Salsa, Champeta and African music from the 80s and 90s.

In 2019 at age 16, Beéle began his career with "Loco" released under Hear The Music co-owned by Puerto Rican record producer DJ Luian, the track achieved significant success across multiple countries. The remix featuring Natti Natasha, Farruko, and Manuel Turizo released the following year (2020) reached number 18 on Billboard's Latin Digital Song Sales chart. After releasing multiple singles, his debut studio album Borondo was released in 2024. On 19 February 2025, he released the song "La Plena (W Sound 05)" with Colombian music project W Sound and Colombian record producer Ovy on the Drums

== Musical career ==
His musical style is characterized by a fusion of tropical and urban rhythms, allowing him to stand out in a highly competitive industry. Beéle has demonstrated versatility as an artist, collaborating with other musicians and bringing his music to international stages, including performances in countries such as Australia, where he has received a warm reception from audiences.

== Personal life ==
In 2019, Beéle began a romantic relationship with social communicator Camila Andrea Rodríguez Ascanio (born 1998), better known as "Cara." She served as his road manager and backing vocalist until August 2023. The couple married on 3 July 2021, and have two children together: Ethan Kai, born on 10 June 2021, and Paolo Kai, born on 14 September 2023. They separated in mid-2024.

Additionally, the singer revealed that during his teenage years he weighed up to 134 kg, but over time he improved his eating habits and adopted a healthier lifestyle, which has helped him stay fit for his demanding live performances.

== Discography ==
=== Studio albums ===
Title	Album details	Peak chart positions				Certifications
Title	Album details	MEX	SPA	US Latin	US	Certifications
Borondo	Released: May 15, 2025; Label: 5020 Records, Hear This Music LLC; Formats: CD, digital download, streaming	–	2	5	56	AMPROFON: Platinum; PROMUSICAE: 2× Platinum; RIAA: 8× Platinum (Latin)

=== Collaborative albums ===
Title	Album details	Peak chart positions				Certifications
Title	Album details	MEX	SPA	US Latin	US	Certifications
Stendhal (with Ozuna)	Released: December 5, 2025; Label: Sony Music Entertainment, Nibiru International LLC; Formats: CD, digital download, streaming	–	22	–	–	

=== EPs ===
Title	Album details	Peak chart positions			Certifications
Title	Album details	MEX	SPA	US Latin	Certifications
Borondo (5020 RCRDS Sessions)	Released: November 27, 2025; Label: 5020 Records, Hear This Music LLC; Formats: digital download, streaming	–	–	–	

== Singles ==
=== As lead artist ===
List of singles as lead artist, with selected chart positions and certifications, showing year released and album name
Title	Year	Peak chart positions								Certifications	Album
Title	Year	COL	ARG	MEX	SPA	US	US Latin	US Latin Airplay	US Latin Pop	Certifications	Album
"Sola" (with Montano & Totoy El Frio)	2019	—	—	—	—	—	—	—	—		Non-album singles
"Loco"	2019	—	—	—	14	—	—	—	—		Non-album singles
"Agüita E' Coco" (with Totoy El Frio)	2019	—	—	—	—	—	—	—	—		Non-album singles
"Tu Boca" (with José Cury & Vallejo Music)	2019	—	—	—	—	—	—	—	—		Non-album singles
"Inolvidable" (with Ovy on the Drums)	2020	—	—	—	83	—	—	—	—		Non-album singles
"Atrevida" (with Dekko & Montano)	2020	—	—	—	—	—	—	—	—		Non-album singles
"Loco" (Remix) (with Farruko, Natti Natasha & Manuel Turizo)	2020	—	—	—	48	—	—	—	—		Non-album singles
"Mi Carta"	2020	—	—	—	—	—	—	—	—		Non-album singles
"La Mujer Traiciona" (with Lenny Tavárez)	2020	—	—	—	—	—	—	—	—		Krack
"Caníbales" (with Las Villa)	2020	—	—	—	—	—	—	—	—		Non-album singles
"Victoria" (with Lunay)	2020	—	—	—	75	—	—	—	—		Non-album singles
"De 0 a Siempre" (with Piso 21)	2020	—	—	—	—	—	—	—	—		Non-album singles
"Aloha" (with Maluma, Rauw Alejandro, Darell, Mambo Kingz & DJ Luian)	2021	—	—	—	11	—	—	—	—		Non-album singles
"Angelito" (with Ovy on the Drums & Bad Milk)	2021	—	—	—	—	—	—	—	—		Non-album singles
"Problemas" (Remix) (with Paris Boy & La Ross Maria)	2021	—	—	—	—	—	—	—	—		Non-album singles
"Insuficiente" (with Sael)	2021	—	—	—	—	—	—	—	—		Non-album singles
"Nómada" (with Manú)	2021	—	—	—	—	—	—	—	—		Non-album singles
"Nanae" (with Jay Menez)	2021	—	—	—	—	—	—	—	—		Non-album singles
"Ella" (Remix) (with Boza, Lunay, Lenny Tavárez & Juhn)	2021	—	—	—	51	—	—	—	—		Bucle
"Si Te Interesa"	2021	—	—	—	—	—	—	—	—		Non-album singles
"Extrañandote" (Remix) (with vf7, Lenny Tavárez & Rauw Alejandro)	2021	—	—	—	—	—	—	—	—		Non-album singles
"Repeat" (with Keityn)	2021	—	—	—	—	—	—	—	—		Non-album singles
"Enchulao" (with Blessd)	2022	—	—	—	—	—	—	—	—		Non-album singles
"Fantasi" (with Tini)	2022	—	—	—	94	—	—	—	—		Cupido
"11:11" (with Reykon)	2022	—	—	—	—	—	—	—	—		Non-album singles
"Nómada" (Viic Remix) (with Manú & Victor Cardenas)	2022	—	—	—	—	—	—	—	—		Non-album singles
"Barranquilla Bajo Cero" (with Myke Towers & Feid)	2022	—	—	—	—	—	—	—	—		Non-album singles
"Cuando Te Veo" (with Eix & Maffio)	2022	—	—	—	—	—	—	—	—		Non-album singles
"Adivina" (with Totoy El Frio)	2022	—	—	—	—	—	—	—	—		Non-album singles
"Daytona" (with Gotay "El Autentiko")	2022	—	—	—	—	—	—	—	—		Non-album singles
"Miami" (with CNCO)	2022	—	—	—	—	—	—	—	—		XOXO
"Tas Clara" (with Big Soto)	2022	—	—	—	—	—	—	—	—		Todo Es Mental
"Te Perdí" (with Andy Rivera)	2022	—	—	—	—	—	—	—	—		Non-album single
"Qué Prefieres?" (with Boza)	2022	—	—	—	—	—	—	—	—		Sin Sol
"Catalina" (Remix) (with Mr Black El Presidente, Nacho & Ñejo)	2022	—	—	—	—	—	—	—	—		Non-album singles
"Enchule" (with Icon & Rios)	2022	—	—	—	—	—	—	—	—		Non-album singles
"Aurora" (Remix) (with Jhosy & Manuel Turizo)	2022	—	—	—	—	—	—	—	—		Mi Primera Vez (EP)
"Aroma" (with Brytiago & Lenny Tavárez)	2022	—	—	—	—	—	—	—	—		Afro Vibes
"Noche Primavera" (with Manú & Andrés Cepeda)	2023	—	—	—	—	—	—	—	—		Non-album singles
"Guaro"	2023	—	—	—	—	—	—	—	—		Non-album singles
"Vagabundo" (with Sebastián Yatra & Manuel Turizo)	2023	—	—	—	3	—	—	—	—		Milagro
"Tú Sí" (with Mar Lucas & Kenia Os)	2023	—	—	—	—	—	—	—	—		La Innocente
"Manos Frías" (with Mau y Ricky & Reik)	2023	—	—	—	—	—	—	—	—		Desgenerados Mixtape
"Santorini" (with Farruko)	2023	—	—	—	—	—	—	—	—		Non-album single
"Calor" (with Nicky Jam)	2023	—	—	—	—	—	—	—	—		Insomnio
"Santorini" (Remix) (with Farruko & Jason Derulo)	2023	—	—	—	—	—	—	—	—		Non-album single
"Cobarde" (with Sofía Reyes)	2023	—	—	—	—	—	—	—	—		Milamores
"Morena"	2023	—	—	—	97	—	—	—	—		Borondo
"Toxic Love" (with Guaynaa)	2023	—	—	—	—	—	—	—	—		Non-album singles
"Soy un HP"	2024	—	—	—	—	—	—	—	—		Non-album singles
"Me Arriesgo Contigo" (with Kany García)	2024	—	—	—	—	—	—	—	—		Non-album singles
"Low Key" (with Maria Becerra, Joeboy & Humby)	2024	—	—	—	—	—	—	—	—		Non-album singles
"Tu Boca" (with Wisin)	2024	—	—	—	—	—	—	—	—		Non-album singles
"Hasta Aquí Llegué" (with Nanpa Básico)	2024	—	—	—	66	—	—	—	—		Duelo; Borondo
"Frente al Mar"	2024	—	—	—	38	—	—	—	—		Borondo
"I Miss You"	2024	—	—	—	—	—	—	—	—		Borondo
"Pinacolada" (Remix) (with Thisizlondon, Ayra Starr & 6lack)	2024	—	—	—	—	—	—	—	—		Non-album single
"Tus Labios" (Remix) (with Sech)	2024	—	—	—	—	—	—	—	—		Tranki, Todo Pasa
"Mi Refe" (with Ovy on the Drums)	2024	—	—	—	3	—	—	—	—		Borondo
"Frente al Mar" (Ozuna Remix) (with Ozuna)	2024	—	—	—	—	—	—	—	—		Non-album singles
"Dime Que No" (with Justin Quiles, Randy & Lenier)	2024	—	—	—	—	—	—	—	—		Non-album singles
"Una Noche Más" (with Cobuz & Bustta)	2025	—	—	—	—	—	—	—	—		Non-album singles
"Volver" (with Piso 21 & Marc Anthony) (or La Salsa version)	2025	—	—	—	54	—	—	—	—		Non-album singles
"Pienso" (with Dani M)	2025	—	—	—	—	—	—	—	—		Non-album singles
"La Plena (W Sound 05)" (with W Sound & Ovy on the Drums)	2025	—	—	—	1	—	—	—	—		Non-album singles
"Sobelove"	2025	—	—	—	15	—	—	—	—		Borondo
"Por Vos" (with Arcángel)	2025	—	—	—	—	—	—	—	—		Non-album single
"Dios Me Oyó" (with Marc Anthony)	2025	—	—	—	—	—	—	—	—		Borondo
"Hiekka" (with Nicky Jam)	2025	—	—	—	10	—	—	—	—		Non-album single
"Borondo"	2025	—	—	—	—	—	—	—	—		Borondo
"Si Mañana Me Muero" (with Thisizlondon)	2025	—	—	—	—	—	—	—	—		Borondo
"No Tiene Sentido"	2025	—	—	—	1	—	—	—	—		Borondo
"Mad Koknut"	2025	—	—	—	—	—	—	—	—		Borondo
"Yo y Tú" (with Ovy on the Drums & Quevedo)	2025	—	—	—	3	—	—	—	—		Non-album single
"Si Te Pillara"	2025	—	—	—	4	—	—	—	—		Borondo
"Universidad" (with TINI)	2025	—	—	—	34	—	—	—	—		Non-album single
"Arena" (with Carla Morrison)	2025	—	—	—	—	—	—	—	—		Borondo
"Quédate" (5020 RCRDS Sessions)	2025	—	—	—	—	—	—	—	—		Borondo (5020 RCRDS Sessions)
"Lençóis Maranhenses"	2025	—	—	—	—	—	—	—	—		Non-album single
"Enemigos" (with Ozuna & Ovy on the Drums)	2025	—	—	—	77	—	—	—	—		Stendhal
"Pikito" (with Ozuna)	2025	—	—	—	—	—	—	—	—		Stendhal

=== As featured artist ===
List of singles as lead artist, with selected chart positions and certifications, showing year released and album name
Title	Year	Peak chart positions								Certifications	Album
Title	Year	COL	ARG	MEX	SPA	US	US Latin	US Latin Airplay	US Latin Pop	Certifications	Album
"Muévelo" (Maljo Perez featuring Beéle)	2020	—	—	—	—	—	—	—	—		Non-album singles
"Uno Mas" (williamtxxx featuring Beéle)	2020	—	—	—	—	—	—	—	—		Non-album singles
"Conmigo" (williamtxxx featuring Beéle, The Willy2ber & Jonn Z)	2020	—	—	—	—	—	—	—	—		Non-album singles
"+Linda" (Remix) (Dalex, Arcángel & Manuel Turizo featuring De La Ghetto & Beéle)	2020	—	—	—	—	—	—	—	—		Non-album singles
"Sigue Sola" (Montano, Juhn, KHEA & Totoy El Frio featuring Jerry Di & Beéle)	2020	—	—	—	—	—	—	—	—		Non-album singles
"Sima" (williamtxxx featuring Beéle)	2020	—	—	—	—	—	—	—	—		Non-album singles
"Otra Baby" (Akim, Boza & Dalex featuring Beéle)	2021	—	—	—	—	—	—	—	—		Haters y Fanáticos
"Amanecer en la Playa" (Suriel cruz el artista featuring Beéle)	2025	—	—	—	—	—	—	—	—		Non-album singles
"Q Pasaria" (El Asignado featuring Beéle)	2025	—	—	—	—	—	—	—	—		Non-album singles
"De To To" (El Asignado featuring Beéle)	2025	—	—	—	—	—	—	—	—		Non-album singles

=== Guest appearances ===
Title	Year	Other artist(s)	Album
"Ropa Interior"	2021	Mike Bahía; Maxiolly; Blessd	Contento
"Un Plan"	2022	Dímelo Flow; Zion & Lennox; Jerry Di	Always Dream
"Si Es Amor"	2022	Danny Ocean	@dannocean2
"Jamaica"	2023	Manuel Turizo	2000
"¿Qué Pasó Bebe?"	2025	Wisin	El Sobreviviente WWW
"Hips Don't Lie" (Anniversary Version)	2025	Shakira; Ed Sheeran	Anniversary - Oral Fixation (20th) and Pies Descalzos (30th) Live - EP

== Awards and nominations ==
Award	Year	Recipient(s)	Category	Result	Ref.
American Music Awards	2026	Himself	Breakthrough Latin Artist	Nominated	
Billboard Latin Music Awards	2026	Himself	Global 200 Latin Artist of the Year	Pending	
Billboard Latin Music Awards	2026	"La Plena" (with W Sound & Ovy on the Drums)	Global 200 Latin Song of the Year	Pending	
Billboard Latin Music Awards	2026	Borondo	Top Latin Album of the Year	Pending	
Billboard Latin Music Awards	2026	Borondo	Top Latin Rhythm Album of the Year	Pending	
Billboard Latin Music Awards	2026	"Algo Tú" (with Shakira)	Latin Pop Song of the Year	Pending	
Heat Latin Music Awards	2025	Himself	Best Urban Artist	Won	
Heat Latin Music Awards	2025	Himself	Best Artist Andean Region	Won	
Heat Latin Music Awards	2025	"Hasta Aquí Llegué" (with Nanpa Básico)	Song of the Year	Nominated	
Heat Latin Music Awards	2025	"Hasta Aquí Llegué" (with Nanpa Básico)	Best Collaboration	Nominated	
Heat Latin Music Awards	2025	"Volver" (with Piso 21 & Marc Anthony)	Best Collaboration	Nominated	
Heat Latin Music Awards	2025	"La Plena" (with W Sound & Ovy on the Drums)	Best Collaboration	Won	
Heat Latin Music Awards	2025	"La Plena" (with W Sound & Ovy on the Drums)	Best Viral Song	Won	
iHeartRadio Music Awards	2026	Himself	Best New Latin/Urban Artist	Won	
Latin Grammy Awards	2025	"La Plena" (with W Sound & Ovy on the Drums)	Best Urban/Urban Fusion Performance	Nominated	
Los 40 Music Awards	2025	Himself	Best Latin Act	Nominated	
Los 40 Music Awards	2025	"Mi Refe" (with Ovy on the Drums)	Best Latin Urban Song	Nominated	
Los 40 Music Awards	2025	Borondo	Best Latin Album	Won	
Los 40 Music Awards	2025	"La Plena" (with W Sound & Ovy on the Drums)	Best Latin Collaboration	Nominated	
Los 40 Music Awards	2025	"Hiekka" (with Nicky Jam)	Best Latin Urban Collaboration	Won	
Premios Juventud	2024	"Manos Frías" (with Mau y Ricky & Reik)	Best Pop/Urban Collaboration	Nominated	
Premios Juventud	2024	"Vagabundo" (with Sebastián Yatra & Manuel Turizo)	Best Pop/Urban Collaboration	Nominated	
Premios Juventud	2025	Himself	Artist of the Year	Nominated	
Premios Juventud	2025	Himself	New Generation – Male Artist	Nominated	
Premios Juventud	2025	"La Plena" (with W Sound & Ovy on the Drums)	Best Urban Track	Nominated	
Premios Juventud	2025	"Volver" (with Piso 21 & Marc Anthony)	Best Pop/Rhythmic Song	Won	
Premios Juventud	2025	"Mi Refe" (with Ovy on the Drums)	Afrobeat of the Year	Nominated	
Premios Juventud	2026	Stendhal	Album of the Year	Nominated	
Premios Juventud	2026	Stendhal	Best Urban Album	Nominated	
Premios Juventud	2026	"Algo Tú" (with Shakira)	Best Dance Track	Nominated	
Premios Juventud	2026	"Enemigos" (with Ozuna & Ovy on the Drums)	Afrobeat Latino of the Year	Won	
Premios Juventud	2026	"Ta' Bien" (with Nicky Jam)	Best Urban Mix	Nominated	
Premios Juventud	2026	"No Tiene Sentido"	Best Urban Rhythmic Song	Nominated	
Premios Juventud	2026	"Yo y Tú" (with Ovy on the Drums & Quevedo)	Best Pop/Rhythmic Song	Nominated	
Premios Lo Nuestro	2024	Himself	New Male Artist	Nominated	
Premios Lo Nuestro	2024	"Vagabundo" (with Sebastián Yatra & Manuel Turizo)	Urban/Pop Collaboration of the Year	Nominated	
Premios Lo Nuestro	2025	"Calor" (with Nicky Jam)	Urban/Pop Collaboration of the Year	Nominated	
Premios Lo Nuestro	2026	Himself	Premio Lo Nuestro Artist of the Year	Nominated	
Premios Lo Nuestro	2026	Himself	Male Urban Artist of the Year	Nominated	
Premios Lo Nuestro	2026	"La Plena" (with W Sound & Ovy on the Drums)	Afrobeats of the Year	Nominated	
Premios Lo Nuestro	2026	"La Plena" (with W Sound & Ovy on the Drums)	Urban Song of the Year	Nominated	
Premios Lo Nuestro	2026	"La Plena" (with W Sound & Ovy on the Drums)	Urban Collaboration of the Year	Nominated	
Premios Lo Nuestro	2026	Borondo	Urban Album of the Year	Nominated	
Premios Lo Nuestro	2026	"Volver" (with Piso 21 & Marc Anthony)	Urban/Pop Collaboration of the Year	Nominated	
Premios Lo Nuestro	2026	"Volver (La Salsa)" (with Piso 21 & Marc Anthony)	Tropical Collaboration of the Year	Nominated	
Premios Nuestra Tierra	2020	Himself	New Artist of the Year	Nominated	
Premios Nuestra Tierra	2021	Himself	Best Urban Artist	Nominated	
Premios Nuestra Tierra	2022	Himself	Best Urban Artist	Nominated	
Premios Nuestra Tierra	2022	"Aloha" (with Maluma, Rauw Alejandro & Darell)	Best Urban Song	Nominated	
Premios Nuestra Tierra	2023	Himself	Best Urban Artist	Nominated	
Premios Nuestra Tierra	2023	"Barranquilla Bajo Cero" (with Myke Towers & Feid)	Best Urban Collaboration	Nominated	
Premios Nuestra Tierra	2023	"Nómada (Vicc Remix)" (with Victor Cardenas & Manú)	Best Dance/Electronic Song	Nominated	
Premios Nuestra Tierra	2024	Himself	Best Urban Artist	Nominated	
Premios Nuestra Tierra	2024	"Calor" (with Nicky Jam)	Best Urban Song	Nominated	
Premios Nuestra Tierra	2024	"Santorini" (with Farruko)	Best Urban Collaboration	Nominated	
Premios Nuestra Tierra	2024	"Noche Primavera" (with Manú & Andrés Cepeda)	Best Pop Song	Nominated	
Premios Nuestra Tierra	2024	"Vagabundo" (with Sebastián Yatra & Manuel Turizo)	Best Video	Nominated	
Premios Nuestra Tierra	2024	"Vagabundo" (with Sebastián Yatra & Manuel Turizo)	Best Tropical Song	Won	
Premios Nuestra Tierra	2025	Himself	Best Urban Artist	Won	
Premios Nuestra Tierra	2025	"Hasta Aquí Llegué" (with Nanpa Básico)	Best Urban Collaboration	Nominated	
Premios Nuestra Tierra	2025	"Mi Refe"	Best Urban Song	Nominated	
Premios Nuestra Tierra	2025	"Frente al Mar"	Best Urban Song	Nominated	
Premios Nuestra Tierra	2026	Himself	Best Global Artist	Nominated	
Premios Nuestra Tierra	2026	Himself	Best Urban Artist	Nominated	
Premios Nuestra Tierra	2026	Himself	Best Afrobeat Artist	Won	
Premios Nuestra Tierra	2026	Borondo	Best Album of the Year	Nominated	
Premios Nuestra Tierra	2026	"La Plena" (with W Sound & Ovy on the Drums)	Best Global Song	Nominated	
Premios Nuestra Tierra	2026	"La Plena" (with W Sound & Ovy on the Drums)	Best Urban Collaboration	Nominated	
Premios Nuestra Tierra	2026	"La Plena" (with W Sound & Ovy on the Drums)	Best Viral Song	Won	
Premios Nuestra Tierra	2026	"Mi Refe"	Best Viral Song	Nominated	
Premios Nuestra Tierra	2026	"Mi Refe"	Best Afrobeat Song	Nominated	
Premios Nuestra Tierra	2026	"Top Diesel"	Best Afrobeat Song	Nominated	
Premios Nuestra Tierra	2026	"Si Te Pillara"	Best Afrobeat Song	Nominated	
Premios Nuestra Tierra	2026	"No Tiene Sentido"	Best Afrobeat Song	Nominated	
Premios Nuestra Tierra	2026	"No Tiene Sentido"	Best Viral Song	Nominated	
Premios Nuestra Tierra	2026	"No Tiene Sentido"	Best Global Song	Nominated	
Premios Nuestra Tierra	2026	"Si Te Pillara"	Best Song/Composition of the Year	Nominated	
Premios Nuestra Tierra	2026	"Volver" (with Piso 21 & Marc Anthony)	Best Song/Composition of the Year	Nominated	
Premios Nuestra Tierra	2026	"Yo y Tú" (with Ovy on the Drums & Quevedo)	Best Urban Collaboration	Nominated	
Premios Nuestra Tierra	2026	8 shows at the Movistar Arena	Best Concert	Nominated	
