= 2024 in Latin music =

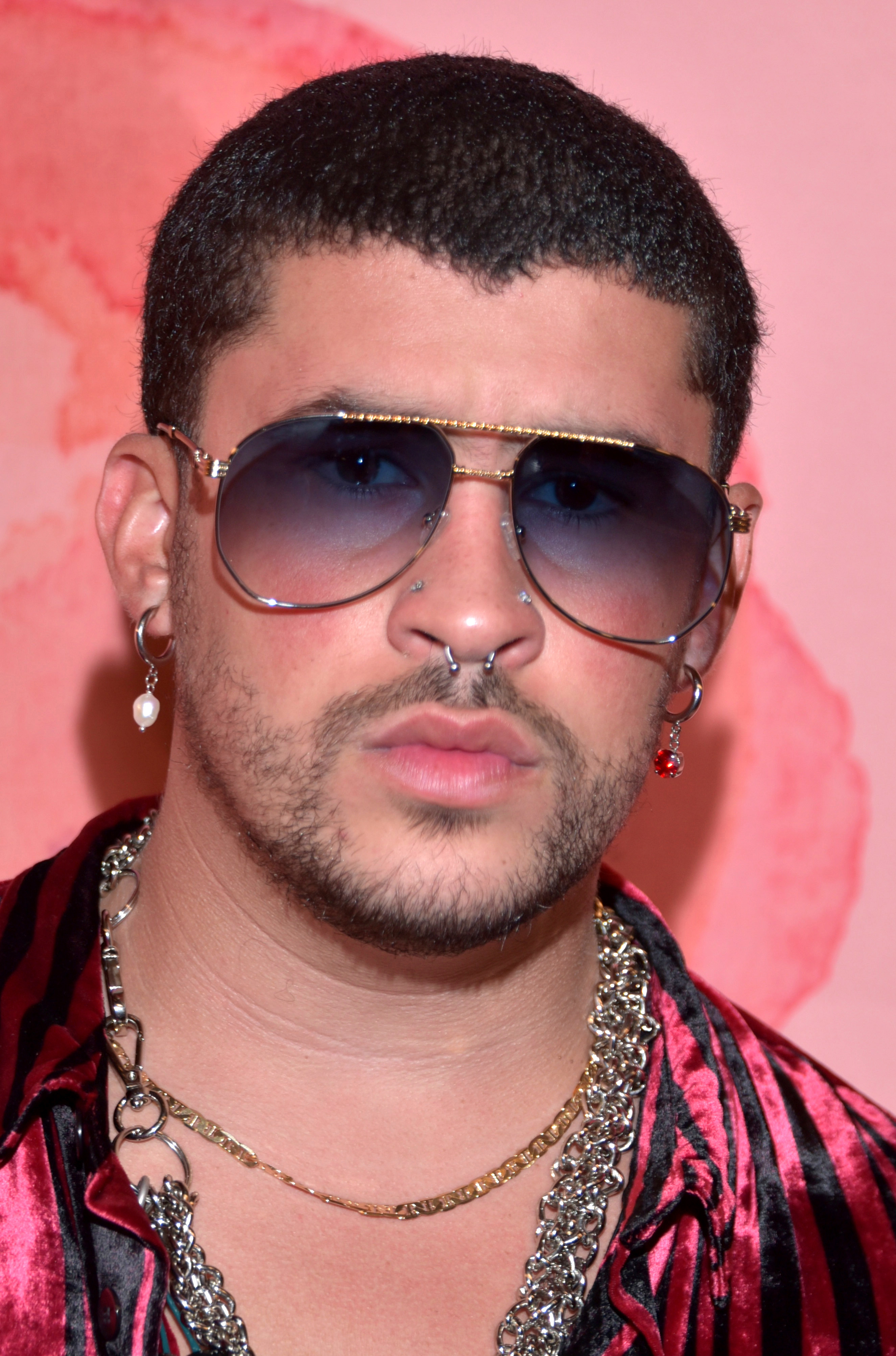
Puerto Rican rapper Bad Bunny was named Top Latin Artist of the Year in the United States by Billboard for the sixth time in a row.

The following is a list of events and new Spanish- and Portuguese-language music that happened in 2024 in Ibero-America. Ibero-America encompasses Latin America, Spain, Portugal, and the Latino population in Canada and the United States.

== Events ==
=== January–March ===
- February 3 – "Zorra", written by Mark Dasousa and Mery Bas, and performed by the synth-pop duo Nebulossa, wins the third edition of the Benidorm Fest, and will represent Spain in the Eurovision Song Contest 2024, held in Malmö, Sweden.
- February 4 – The 66th Annual Grammy Awards take place at the Crypto.com Arena in Los Angeles.
  - X Mí (Vol. 1) by Gaby Moreno wins Best Latin Pop Album.
  - Mañana Será Bonito by Karol G wins Best Música Urbana Album.
  - De Todas las Flores by Natalia Lafourcade and Vida Cotidiana by Juanes tie for Best Latin Rock or Alternative Album.
  - Génesis by Peso Pluma wins Best Música Mexicana Album (including Tejano).
  - Siembra: 45º Aniversario (En Vivo en el Coliseo de Puerto Rico, 14 de Mayo 2022) by Rubén Blades and Roberto Delgado & Orquesta wins Best Tropical Latin Album.
  - El Arte del Bolero Vol. 2 by Miguel Zenón and Luis Perdomo wins Best Latin Jazz Album.
- February 10 – "Yo Solo Quiero Amor" from the film Love & Revolution, written by Rigoberta Bandini, wins Best Original Song at the 38th Goya Awards.
- February 22 – The Premio Lo Nuestro 2024 take place at Kaseya Center in Miami, United States.
  - Karol G wins Artist of the Year.
  - Mañana Será Bonito by Karol G wins Album of the Year.
  - "Shakira: Bzrp Music Sessions, Vol. 53" by Bizarrap and Shakira wins Song of the Year.
  - Peso Pluma and Kenia Os win New Artist – Male and New Artist – Female, respectively.
- February 25 – The 63rd edition of the Viña del Mar International Song Festival takes place until March 1. Musical performers included Los Bunkers, Young Cister, Miranda!, María Becerra, Nicki Nicole, Trueno, and Anitta, among other.
- March 6 – Karol G received the Woman of the Year Award at the Billboard Women in Music. Young Miko receives the Impact Award and Luísa Sonza is one of the three singers honored with the Global Force Award.
- March 9 – "Grito", written by Iolanda Costa and Alberto "Luar" Hernández, and performed by Iolanda, wins the 56th edition of the Festival da Canção, and will represent Portugal in the Eurovision Song Contest 2024, held in Malmö, Sweden.
- March 13 – The 5th Annual Premios Odeón take place to recognize the best in Spanish music.
  - Donde Quiero Estar by Quevedo win Album of the Year.
  - "Nochentera" by Vicco wins Song of the Year.

=== April–June ===
- April 1 – At the 2024 iHeartRadio Music Awards, held at the Dolby Theatre in Los Angeles, Shakira, Bizarrap, Karol G, Peso Pluma, Eslabón Armado, and Young Miko, all win awards in the Latin categories.
- April 12 to April 21 – Peso Pluma, Young Miko, Santa Fe Klan, J Balvin, Carín León and Ludmilla, all perform on the main stage at Coachella 2024. Other performers include Son Rompe Pera, Girl Ultra, Hermanos Gutiérrez, Cimafunk, Kevin Kaarl and Erika de Casier.
- April 25 – The 9th Annual Latin American Music Awards take place at the MGM Grand Garden Arena in Las Vegas. Teatro Mayor Julio Mario Santo Domingo
  - Karol G wins Artist of the Year.
  - Young Miko wins New Artist of the Year.
  - "TQG" by Karol G & Shakira wins Song of the Year.
  - Mañana Será Bonito wins Album of the Year.
- May 8 – The 13th Premios Nuestra Tierra takes place at the Teatro Mayor Julio Mario Santo Domingo in Bogotá to reward the best in Colombian music.
  - Karol G wins Artist of the Year.
  - Mañana Será Bonito by Karol G wins Album of the Year.
  - "Mientras Me Curo del Cora" by Karol G wins Song of the Year.
- May 11 – Spain places twenty-second at the 68th edition of the Eurovision Song Contest with the song "Zorra", performed by Nebulossa. Portugal ends tenth.
- May 28 – The 26th Annual Premios Gardel takes place at Movistar Arena in Buenos Aires, to recognize the best in Argentine music.
  - Hotel Miranda! by Miranda! wins Album of the Year.
  - "Obsesión" by Lali wins Song of the Year.
  - "La Rueda Mágica – EADDA9223" by Fito Páez featuring Andrés Calamaro & Conociendo Rusia wins Record of the Year.
  - Milo J wins Best New Artist.
- June 6 – The 10th Premios Pulsar take place to recognize the best in Chilean music.
  - Autopoiética by Mon Laferte wins Album of the Year.
  - "Rey" by Los Bunkers wins Song of the Year.
  - Los Bunkers win Artist of the Year.
  - Asia Menor win Best New Artist.
- June 10 – The inaugural Premios de la Academia de la Música take place to recognize the best in Spanish music, replacing the Premios Odeón. Arde Bogotá receives the most awards with six, including Artist of the Year, New Artist of the Year, Album of the Year for Cowboys de la A3, and Song of the Year for "Los Perros".
- June 10 – At the 13th Libera Awards, dedicated to recognize the best in independent music in the United States, Helado Negro wins the Best Latin Record award for "LFO (Lupe Finds Oliveros)".
- June 12 – The 31st Brazilian Music Awards are held at the Theatro Municipal in Rio de Janeiro.

=== July–September ===
- July 13 – The 11th Annual MTV MIAW Awards take place at the Pepsi Center WTC in Mexico City. Natanael Cano and Karol G lead with three awards each.
- July 25 – The 21st Premios Juventud are held at the José Miguel Agrelot Coliseum in San Juan, Puerto Rico.
  - Carin León wins Artist of the Youth – Male.
  - Karol G wins Artist of the Youth – Female.
  - Fuerza Regida wins Favorite Group or Duo of The Year
  - Ela Taubert and Luar La L win The New Generation – Female and The New Generation – Male, respectively.
- September 11 – At the 2024 MTV Video Music Awards, held at the UBS Arena in Elmont, New York, Anitta wins Best Latin for "Mil Veces".

=== October–December ===
- October 20 – The 31st Billboard Latin Music Awards are held at Fillmore Miami Beach. Karol G received the most awards with eight out of seventeen nominations. Other winners include Bad Bunny for Artist of the Year and Xavi for New Artist of the Year. Special awards were presented to Pepe Aguilar (Hall of Fame Award), Alejandro Sanz (Lifetime Achievement Award) and J Balvin (Spirit of Hope Award).
- November 8 – The 19th Los 40 Music Awards take place at the Palau Sant Jordi in Barcelona. Myke Towers and Rauw Alejandro both lead with three wins each.
- November 10 – At the 2024 MTV Europe Music Awards, held at the Co-op Live in Manchester, United Kingdom, Peso Pluma wins Best Latin.
  - The Regional awards winners were: Lola Índigo (Best Spanish Act), Bárbara Bandeira (Best Portuguese Act), Pabllo Vittar (Best Brazilian Act), Young Miko (Best Caribbean Act), YeriMua (Best Latin America North Act), Manuel Turizo (Best Latin America Central Act), and Dillom (Best Latin America South Act).
- November 14 – The 25th Annual Latin Grammy Awards are held at the Kaseya Center in Miami, Florida:
  - Juan Luis Guerra wins the Latin Grammy Awards for Record of the Year for "Mambo 23" and Album of the Year for Radio Güira.
  - "Derrumbe" by Jorge Drexler wins Song of the Year
  - Ela Taubert wins Best New Artist
- November 20 - Ivy Queen becomes the first reggaeton artist to headline a concert at the Carnegie Hall in New York City.
- November 22 - David Marez and Placido Salazar were awarded the Lifetime Achievement Award at the 2024 Tejano Music Awards, while Jay Perez received three wins, the most at the event.
- December 3 – The 2024 Multishow Brazilian Music Awards take place at the Riocentro in Rio de Janeiro.
  - Liniker wins four awards, including both Artist of the Year and Album of the Year, the latter for Caju.
  - Anitta wins TVZ Music Video of the Year for "Mil Veces".
  - Lauana Prado wins Hit of the Year for "Escrito nas Estrelas".

== Number-one albums and singles by country ==
- List of Billboard Argentina Hot 100 number-one singles of 2024
- List of number-one albums of 2024 (Portugal)
- List of number-one singles of 2024 (Portugal)
- List of number-one albums of 2024 (Spain)
- List of Hot 100 number-one singles of 2024 (Brazil)
- List of number-one singles of 2024 (Spain)
- List of number-one Billboard Latin Albums from the 2020s
- List of Billboard Hot Latin Songs and Latin Airplay number ones of 2024

== Spanish- and Portuguese-language songs on the Billboard Global 200 ==
The Billboard Global 200 is a weekly record chart published by Billboard magazine that ranks the top songs globally based on digital sales and online streaming from over 200 territories worldwide.

An asterisk (*) represents that a single is charting for the current week.

Song	Performer(s)	Entry	Peak	Weeks	Ref.
2020 entries
"Mamichula"	Trueno & Nicki Nicole feat. Taiu, Bizarrap & Tatool	September 19, 2020	100	7	
"Feliz Navidad"	José Feliciano	November 28, 2020	5	38	
2022 entries
"La Bachata"	Manuel Turizo	July 23, 2022	6	112	
2023 entries
"Que Vuelvas"	Carín León X Grupo Frontera	January 7, 2023	34	41	
"TQG"	Karol G x Shakira	March 11, 2023	1	55	
"La Bebé"	Yng Lvcas x Peso Pluma	March 11, 2023	2	62	
"Ella Baila Sola"	Eslabón Armado X Peso Pluma	April 1, 2023	1	50	
"Classy 101"	Feid x Young Miko	April 15, 2023	17	48	
"Un x100to"	Grupo Frontera X Bad Bunny	April 29, 2023	1	46	
"Amargura"	Karol G	June 3, 2023	71	67	
"Danza Kuduro"	Don Omar & Lucenzo	June 3, 2023	75	74*	
"Lady Gaga"	Peso Pluma, Gabito Ballesteros & Junior H	July 8, 2023	13	38	
"Sabor Fresa"	Fuerza Regida	July 8, 2023	16	25	
"LaLa"	Myke Towers	July 15, 2023	3	38	
"Primera Cita"	Carín León	July 15, 2023	28	38	
"Columbia"	Quevedo	July 22, 2023	17	31	
"El Amor de Su Vida"	Grupo Frontera & Grupo Firme	August 19, 2023	38	47	
"Mi Ex Tenía Razón"	Karol G	August 26, 2023	13	32	
"Qlona"	Karol G & Peso Pluma	August 26, 2023	7	61	
"Qué Onda"	Calle 24 x Chino Pacas x Fuerza Regida	September 16, 2023	26	36	
"Según Quién"	Maluma & Carín León	September 30, 2023	17	43	
"Let's Go 4"	DJ GBR, MC IG, MC Ryan SP, MC PH, MC Davi, MC Luki, MC Don Juan, MC Kadu, Traplaudo, MC GP & MC GH Do 7	September 30, 2023	158	2	
"Si No Estás"	Iñigo Quintero	October 14, 2023	5	26	
"Y Lloro"	Junior H	October 21, 2023	77	37	
"Lollipop"	Darell	October 21, 2023	34	19	
"Monaco"	Bad Bunny	October 28, 2023	1	27	
"Perro Negro"	Bad Bunny & Feid	October 28, 2023	4	39	
"Lou Lou"	Gabito Ballesteros X Natanael Cano	November 4, 2023	76	10	
"Harley Quinn"	Fuerza Regida & Marshmello	November 11, 2023	14	24	
"Reggaeton Champagne"	Bellakath & Dani Flow	November 11, 2023	124	11	
"Daqui Pra Sempre"	Manu & Simone Mendes	November 18, 2023	136	4	
"Diluvio"	Rauw Alejandro	November 25, 2023	95	15	
"La Víctima"	Xavi	December 16, 2023	10	23	
"La Diabla"	Xavi	December 23, 2023	3	28	
"Luna"	Feid & ATL Jacob	December 23, 2023	12	74	
"Bellakeo"	Peso Pluma & Anitta	December 23, 2023	7	22	
"Ando"	Jere Klein	December 30, 2023	75	14	
2024 entries
"Me Leva Pra Casa / Escrito Nas Estrelas / Saudade"	Lauana Prado	January 6, 2024	100	3	
"Rompe la Dompe"	Peso Pluma, Junior H & Óscar Maydon	January 13, 2024	51	6	
"Déjà Vu"	Luan E Ana Castela	January 13, 2024	102	2	
"Poco a Poco"	Xavi X Dareyes de La Sierra	January 13, 2024	100	9	
"Modo DND"	Xavi X Tony Aguirre	January 13, 2024	163	5	
"Maria Mariah"	Silva MC, DJ F7, JC no Beat & MC Meno Dani	January 20, 2024	153	1	
"Una Foto"	Mesita X Nicki Nicole X Tiago PZK X Emilia	January 20, 2024	46	15	
"Igual Que Un Ángel"	Kali Uchis & Peso Pluma	January 27, 2024	9	11	
"Bzrp Music Sessions, Vol. 58"	Bizarrap & Young Miko	January 27, 2024	14	8	
"First Love"	Óscar Ortiz X Edgardo Núñez	January 27, 2024	50	11	
"Alucín"	Eugenio Esquivel X Grupo Marca Registrada X Sebastián Esquivel	January 27, 2024	123	4	
"La Falda"	Myke Towers	February 3, 2024	54	17	
"No Te Quieren Conmigo"	Gaby Music, Lunay & Luar La L	February 3, 2024	167	2	
"Hola Perdida"	Luck Ra X Khea	February 3, 2024	172	2	
"La Intención"	Christian Nodal & Peso Pluma	February 10, 2024	96	4	
"Macetando"	Ivete Sangalo & Ludmilla	February 24, 2024	117	1	
"Gata Only"	FloyyMenor X Cris Mj	February 24, 2024	4	110	
"Perna Bamba"	Parangolé & Leo Santana	February 24, 2024	159	1	
"Contigo"	Karol G & Tiësto	March 2, 2024	24	8	
"A Tu Manera"	Junior H & Peso Pluma	March 2, 2024	128	1	
"Regalo de Dios"	Julión Álvarez	March 2, 2024	124	18	
"Tu Name"	Fuerza Regida	March 16, 2024	64	15	
"Madonna"	Natanael Cano & Óscar Maydon	March 23, 2024	26	22	
"VVS Switch (Remix)"	Pressure 9X19 X Hades 66 X Yovngchimi X C Dobleta X Luar La L X Anuel AA	March 30, 2024	110	1	
"Corazón de Piedra"	Xavi	April 6, 2024	43	9	
"La People II"	Peso Pluma, Tito Double P & Joel de la P	April 6, 2024	61	5	
"Puntería"	Shakira & Cardi B	April 6, 2024	69	1	
"Elvira"	Óscar Maydon, Gabito Ballesteros & Chino Pacas	April 6, 2024	190	1	
"La Ranger"	Sech, Justin Quiles, Lenny Tavárez, Dalex and Dímelo Flow featuring Myke Towers	April 13, 2024	176	2	
"Bzrp Music Sessions, Vol. 59"	Bizarrap & Natanael Cano	April 20, 2024	26	4	
"Entre las de Veinte"	Bizarrap & Natanael Cano	April 20, 2024	51	4	
"El Boss"	Gabito Ballesteros & Natanael Cano	April 20, 2024	196	1	
"Si No Quieres No"	Luis R Conríquez x Netón Vega	April 27, 2024	34	33	
"Bby Boo"	iZaak, Jhayco & Anuel AA	April 27, 2024	179	3	
"Rockstar"	Junior H	April 27, 2024	193	1	
"Santa"	Rvssian, Rauw Alejandro & Ayra Starr	May 4, 2024	24	29	
"Bésame (Remix)"	Bhavi, Seven Kayne, Milo J, Tiago PZK, Khea & Neo Pistea	May 4, 2024	112	2	
"Ride Or Die, Pt. 2"	Sevdaliza feat. Villano Antillano & Tokischa	May 4, 2024	112	4	
"Offline"	Young Miko & Feid	May 4, 2024	123	6	
"Adivino"	Myke Towers & Bad Bunny	May 11, 2024	28	13	
"Un Desperdicio"	Rels B & Junior H	May 11, 2024	134	2	
"La Vida Sin Ti"	Rels B & Lia Kali	May 11, 2024	179	1	
"300 Noches"	Belinda & Natanael Cano	May 11, 2024	179	1	
"Digitando"	Gustavo Moura & Rafael	May 18, 2024	189	1	
"La Durango"	Peso Pluma, Junior H & Eslabón Armado	May 25, 2024	83	2	
"Ya Te Olvidé"	Natanael Cano	June 1, 2024	179	1	
"Si No Es Contigo"	Cris Mj	June 8, 2024	37	49	
"MTG Quem Não Quer Sou Eu"	DJ Topo, MC Leozin & Seu Jorge	June 8, 2024	103	2	
"Volver Al Futuro"	Óscar Maydon & Junior H	June 15, 2024	69	4	
"Real Gangsta Love"	Trueno	June 22, 2024	22	12	
"Sorry 4 That Much"	Feid	June 22, 2024	56	13	
"Si Antes Te Hubiera Conocido"	Karol G	July 6, 2024	5	123*	
"Vino Tinto"	Peso Pluma, Natanael Cano & Gabito Ballesteros	July 6, 2024	94	2	
"WYA"	J Abdiel X iZaak	July 6, 2024	93	18	
"Reloj"	Peso Pluma & Iván Cornejo	July 6, 2024	130	1	
"La Patrulla"	Peso Pluma & Netón Vega	July 6, 2024	34	30	
"Mírame"	Blessd & Ovy on the Drums	July 13, 2024	58	26	
"Apaga el Cel"	FloyyMenor & Lewis Somes	July 27, 2024	166	3	
"Ohnana"	Kapo	August 3, 2024	60	14	
"Hay Lupita"	Lomiiel	August 3, 2024	161	1	
"Nel"	Fuerza Regida	August 17, 2024	63	16	
"Só Fé"	Grelo	August 24, 2024	174	2	
"Uwaie"	Kapo	August 31, 2024	30	12	
"Se Me Olvida"	Maisak feat. Feid	September 7, 2024	52	6	
"Los Cuadros"	Peso Pluma & Tito Double P	September 7, 2024	157	2	
"Peligrosa"	FloyyMenor	September 14, 2024	72	12	
"Dos Días"	Tito Double P & Peso Pluma	September 14, 2024	28	35	
"El Lokerón"	Tito Double P	September 21, 2024	27	24	
"Escápate"	Tito Double P & Chino Pacas	September 21, 2024	55	16	
"Después de la 1"	Cris Mj & FloyyMenor	September 28, 2024	53	10	
"Rey Sin Reina"	Julión Álvarez y su Norteño Banda	September 28, 2024	93	5	
"Una Velita"	Bad Bunny	October 5, 2024	81	1	
"Q U É V A S H A C E R H O Y ?"	Omar Courtz & De La Rose	October 12, 2024	23	11	
"Soltera"	Shakira	October 12, 2024	28	10	
"Tu Boda"	Óscar Maydon & Fuerza Regida	October 12, 2024	4	40	
"Ay Mamá"	Tito Double P & Grupo Frontera	October 26, 2024	153	6	
"Barbie"	DJ Glenner & MC Tuto	November 9, 2024	55	7	
"Presidente"	Gabito Ballesteros, Natanael Cano, Netón Vega & Luis R Conríquez	November 9, 2024	48	22	
"Degenere"	Myke Towers	November 9, 2024	73	13	
"Nueva Era"	DuKi & Myke Towers	November 16, 2024	130	2	
"+57"	Karol G, Feid & DFZM featuring Ovy on the Drums, J Balvin, Maluma, Ryan Castro & Blessd	November 23, 2024	20	5	
"Qué Pasaría..."	Rauw Alejandro & Bad Bunny	November 30, 2024	20	59	
"Khé?"	Rauw Alejandro & Romeo Santos	November 30, 2024	28	27	
"Se Fue"	Rauw Alejandro & Laura Pausini	November 30, 2024	57	2	
"Tú con Él"	Rauw Alejandro	November 30, 2024	65	2	
"Revolú"	Rauw Alejandro & Feid	November 30, 2024	123	1	
"Déjame Entrar"	Rauw Alejandro	November 30, 2024	157	1	
"Nadie"	Tito Double P	December 7, 2024	41	24	
"Cosas Pendientes"	Maluma	December 7, 2024	141	1	
"El Clúb"	Bad Bunny	December 21, 2024	15	12	
"Rosones"	Tito Double P	December 21, 2024	34	21	
"Gervonta"	Peso Pluma	December 21, 2024	127	6	
"Amapola"	Natanael Cano X Nueva H	December 21, 2024	164	2	
"Última Noite"	Léo Foguete	December 28, 2024	71	6	

== Spanish-language songs on the Billboard Hot 100 ==
The Billboard Hot 100 ranks the most-played songs in the United States based on sales (physical and digital), radio play, and online streaming. Also included are certifications awarded by the Recording Industry Association of America (RIAA) based on digital downloads and on-demand audio and/or video song streams: gold certification is awarded for sales of 500,000 copies, platinum for one million units, and multi-platinum for two million units, and following in increments of one million thereafter. The RIAA also awards Spanish-language songs under the Latin certification: Disco de Oro (Gold) is awarded for sales 30,000 certification copies, Disco de Platino (Platinum) for 60,000 units, and Disco de Multi-Platino (Multi-Platinum) for 120,000 units, and following in increments of 60,000 thereafter.

Song	Performer(s)	Entry	Peak	Weeks	RIAA certification	Ref.
2017 entries
"Feliz Navidad"	José Feliciano	January 7, 2017	6	43		
2023 entries
"Sabor Fresa"	Fuerza Regida	July 8, 2023	26	16	37× Platinum (Latin)	
"El Amor de Su Vida"	Grupo Frontera & Grupo Firme	August 19, 2023	67	20		
"Mi Ex Tenía Razón"	Karol G	August 26, 2023	22	16		
"Qlona"	Karol G & Peso Pluma	August 26, 2023	28	21		
"Amargura"	Karol G	August 26, 2023	85	6		
"Qué Onda"	Calle 24 x Chino Pacas x Fuerza Regida	September 16, 2023	61	19	Diamond (Latin)	
"Según Quién"	Maluma & Carín León	October 7, 2023	65	17	13× Platinum (Latin)	
"Y Lloro"	Junior H	October 21, 2023	79	7		
"Monaco"	Bad Bunny	October 28, 2023	5	21		
"Perro Negro"	Bad Bunny & Feid	October 28, 2023	20	20		
"Harley Quinn"	Fuerza Regida & Marshmello	November 18, 2023	40	20	27× Platinum (Latin)	
"Bellakeo"	Peso Pluma & Anitta	December 30, 2023	53	14	38× Platinum (Latin)	
"La Diabla"	Xavi	December 30, 2023	20	20	25× Platinum (Latin)	
"La Víctima"	Xavi	December 30, 2023	46	15	18× Platinum (Latin)	
2024 entries
"Rompe la Dompe"	Peso Pluma, Junior H & Óscar Maydon	January 13, 2024	81	2		
"Igual Que Un Ángel"	Kali Uchis & Peso Pluma	January 27, 2024	22	10	Platinum	
"First Love"	Óscar Ortiz X Edgardo Núñez	February 3, 2024	91	3	2× Platinum (Latin)	
"La Intención"	Christian Nodal & Peso Pluma	February 10, 2024	92	1	7× Platinum (Latin)	
"Contigo"	Karol G & Tiësto	March 2, 2024	61	4		
"Tu Name"	Fuerza Regida	March 2, 2024	66	14		
"Baby Please"	Iván Cornejo	March 30, 2024	95	1		
"Gata Only"	FloyyMenor X Cris Mj	March 30, 2024	27	26	4× Platinum; 5× Diamond (Latin)	
"La People II"	Peso Pluma, Tito Double P & Joel de la P	April 6, 2024	69	2	18× Platinum (Latin)	
"Puntería"	Shakira & Cardi B	April 6, 2024	72	1		
"Corazón de Piedra"	Xavi	April 6, 2024	73	4		
"Adivino"	Myke Towers & Bad Bunny	May 11, 2024	63	2	6× Platinum (Latin)	
"Si No Quieres No"	Luis R Conríquez X Netón Vega	May 18, 2024	53	20	3× Platinum (Latin)	
"La Durango"	Peso Pluma, Junior H & Eslabón Armado	May 25, 2024	75	1		
"Si No Es Contigo"	Cris Mj	June 8, 2024	72	4		
"Si Antes Te Hubiera Conocido"	Karol G	July 6, 2024	32	20		
"Reloj"	Peso Pluma & Iván Cornejo	July 6, 2024	69	1		
"Vino Tinto"	Peso Pluma, Natanael Cano & Gabito Ballesteros	July 6, 2024	91	1		
"La Patrulla"	Peso Pluma & Netón Vega	July 6, 2024	47	18	51× Platinum (Latin)	
"Nel"	Fuerza Regida	August 10, 2024	70	14		
"Dos Días"	Tito Double P & Peso Pluma	September 21, 2024	51	20	46× Platinum (Latin)	
"Una Velita"	Bad Bunny	October 5, 2024	79	1		
"El Lokerón"	Tito Double P	October 12, 2024	73	8		
"Tu Boda"	Óscar Maydon & Fuerza Regida	November 2, 2024	22	20	28× Platinum (Latin)	
"+57"	Karol G, Feid & DFZM featuring Ovy on the Drums, J Balvin, Maluma, Ryan Castro & Blessd	November 23, 2024	62	1		
"Qué Pasaría..."	Rauw Alejandro & Bad Bunny	November 30, 2024	34	21	Gold (Latin)	
"Khé?"	Rauw Alejandro & Romeo Santos	November 30, 2024	60	10		
"Tú con Él"	Rauw Alejandro	November 30, 2024	69	1		
"Se Fue"	Rauw Alejandro & Laura Pausini	November 30, 2024	82	1		
"Revolú"	Rauw Alejandro & Feid	November 30, 2024	88	1		
"Déjame Entrar"	Rauw Alejandro	November 30, 2024	96	1		
"El Clúb"	Bad Bunny	December 21, 2024	27	9		
"Rosones"	Tito Double P	December 21, 2024	78	6	9× Platinum (Latin)	

== Albums released ==
The following is a list of notable Latin albums (music performed in Spanish or Portuguese) (Note: In the United States, Billboard and the RIAA recognizes an album as "Latin" if 51% or more of its content is sung in the Spanish language. The Latin Recording Academy extends this definition of "Latin music" to include Portuguese-language records as well as other languages and dialects of Ibero-America such as Catalan, Nahuatl, Quechua, Galician, Valencia, and Mayan. The Latin Recording Academy also includes Latin instrumental recordings performed by Ibero-American musicians. Note that Spain and Portugal are included under this definition of Ibero-America.) that have been released in Latin America, Spain, Portugal, or the United States in 2024.

=== First quarter ===
==== January ====
Day	Title	Artist(s)	Genre(s)	Singles	Label
4	Corridos Bélicos, Vol. IV	Luis R. Conriquez	Regional Mexican	"La Belikiza"; "Nemesio"; "Sin Tanto Royo"	Kartel Music
5	RealG4Life, Vol. 4	Ñengo Flow	Reggaeton, Trap	"Gato de Noche"; "Fast Money"; "Puesta Pal' Perreo"	Real G Music, LLC, Rimas Entertainment
6	Cocoliche Life	Bersuit Vergarabat	Pop rock	"Victimas"	Pirca Records
12	Orquídeas	Kali Uchis	Indie Rock, Psychedelic, Neo Soul, Merengue, Reggaeton, Dancehall, Bolero, Contemporary R&B	"Muñekita"; "Te Mata"; "Labios Mordidos"	Geffen Records
18	Vida	Ana Tijoux	Reggaeton	"Niñx"; "Tania"	Altafonte
18	Zorro	Various artists	Latin pop		Universal Music Latino
19	Sol María	Eladio Carrión	Trap, Reggaeton, Hardcore Hip Hop	"TQMQA"	Rimas
19	El Cocho de Tierra Caliente	Gerardo Diaz y Su Gerarquia	Regional Mexican		AfinArte Music
19	Tauro	Myriam Hernández	Latin pop		JenesisPro
25	La Joia	Bad Gyal	Latin Pop, Reggaeton, Dancehall	"Sexy"; "Sin carné"; "Real G"; "Chulo pt. 2"; "Mi Lova"; "Give Me"; "Bota Niña"; "Perdió este culo"	Universal Music Latino, Interscope Records
25	Si Sabe	Blessd	Reggae	"Si Sabe"	Warner Music Latina
25	Planes de Medianoche	Young Cister	Reggaeton	"Puerto Escondido"; "Bad Gyal"; "Hasta la Luna"	Sony Music Chile
29	Alicia en el Metalverso	Mägo de Oz	Heavy Rock, Folk Rock	"Luna de Sangre"	Warner Music Spain
31	Tardezinha Pela Vida Inteira (Ao Vivo)	Thiaguinho	Samba		Paz & Bem, Virgin Music Brasil

==== February ====
Day	Title	Artist(s)	Genre(s)	Singles	Label
1	Que Nos Falte Todo	Luck Ra	Cuarteto	"Quiero Creer"; "La Morocha"; "Que Me Falte Todo"; "Toco y Me Voy"; "Te Fuist de Mi Vida"; "Hola Perdida"; "Se Que Vas a Doler"; "Ojalá"	Sony Music Argentina
2	Lealtad	Marca MP	Regional Mexican		Sun Meadow
2	Bolero	Ángela Aguilar	Latin Pop	"Piensa en Mí"	Machin Records
2	Luz	Anonimus	Reggaeton		GLAD Empire
8	Modus Operandi	Intocable	Norteno		Good I Music
9	Dolido Pero No Arrepentido	Fuerza Regida	Corrido	"Tú Name"	Sony Music Latin
9	De la Uno a la 1000 (Primera Temporada)	Omar Geles	Vallenato		Diatónica Artist Management
9	LNDT	Los Nietos de Terán	Norteno		Fonovisa
16	Pa Las Vibras 2	Herencia de Patrones	Regional Mexican	"Heisenbern"; "Casino"	Rancho Humilde
16	Llamada Perdida	Prince Royce	Bachata	"Lao' a Lao'"; "Te Espero"; "Si Te Preguntan..."; "Otra Vez"; "Le Doy 20 Mil"; "Me EnRD"; "Cosas de la Peda"; "Morfina"	Sony Music Latin
22	Las Letras Ya No Importan	Residente	Latin Rap	"René"; "This Is Not America"; "Quiero Ser Baladista"; "Problema Cabrón"; "Ron en el Piso"; "Pólvora de Ayer"; "313"	Sony Music Latin, 5020 Records
23	Yo Te Extrañaré	Luis Angel "El Flaco"	Regional Mexican		Sony Music Mexico
23	Boiadeira Internacional (Ao Vivo)	Ana Castela	Sertanejo, Bachata, Reggaeton, Alt-Pop, Electro		Agroplay Music
23	Alkemi	Daymé Arocena	Afro-Cuban, Reggaeton		Brownswood Recordings
23	Costuras del Karma	Elane			
25	Capicú	RaiNao	R&B, Afrobeats		Sonar
29	Los Rompecorazones, Vol. 2	Kidd Voodoo	Reggaeton	"Prendía"	Kidd Voodoo
29	Quiero Mejor	Kevin Johansen	Latin Pop	"Quiero Mejor"	Sony Music Latin

==== March ====
Day	Title	Artist(s)	Genre(s)	Singles	Label
1	Mejor Que Ayer	Diego Torres	Vocal	"Mejor Que Ayer"; "Las Leyes de la Vida"; "Kapun"	Sony Music Latin
1	Evoluxion	DannyLux	Regional Mexican		Warner Music Latina
1	Capriccio Latino	Alexis Cardenas	Classical music		Independent
7	Maquillada en la Cama	Juliana Gattas	Latin pop	"Maquillada en la Cama"; "Borracha en un Baño Ajeno"; "Emocionalmente Tuya"	Sony Music Latin
13	Se o Meu Peito Fosse o Mundo	Jota.Pê	MPB		Slap, Som Livre
15	El Dorado (En Vivo)	Aterciopelados	Latin Rock		Entre Casa
15	Estopía	Estopa	Rock	"El Día Que Tú Te Marches"; "La Rumba de Pescailla"; "La Ranchera"	Sony Music Spain
15	Yo Deluxe	Christian Alicea	Salsa		Therapist Music
15	¿Y El Fin Del Amor?	Mariana Mazú	Tango		Acqua
15	Temporal	Vocal Livre	Christian		Ventania, Vocal Livre
15	Sonido Inmortal	Flex	Reggaeton		Asterisco Records
21	Descartable	Wos	Latin Rap, Rock	"Descartable"; "Morfeo"; "Melancolía"; "Cabezas Cromadas"; "La Niebla"; "Quemarás"	Dale Play
21	Tofu	Caloncho	Latin pop		Universal Music Mexico
22	Las Mujeres Ya No Lloran	Shakira	Reggaeton, Bachata, Afrobeat, Cumbia	"Te Felicito"; "Monotonía"; "Shakira: Bzrp Music Sessions, Vol. 53"; "TQG"; "Acróstico"; "Copa Vacía"; "El Jefe"; "Puntería"	Sony Music Latin
22	Terca	Sofi Saar	Norteño		BAM Songs S.A
22	Faróis do Sertão	Gabriel Sater	Folk		Indomável
28	Jay de la Cueva	Jay de la Cueva	Pop rock		Universal Music México
29	The Academy: Segunda Misión	Dímelo Flow, Sech, Dalex, Justin Quiles and Lenny Tavárez	Reggaeton	"Si Si Si Si"; "La Ranger"; "Latte"; "Flowhot"; "El Royce"	Rich Music
29	Los Gangsters También Lloran	Pablo Chill-E	Reggaeton		G STARR Entertainment
29	Final (Vol. 2)	Enrique Iglesias	Latin Pop, Bachata	"Asi es la Vida"; "Fría"; "Space in My Heart"	Sony Music Latin
29	Vacilón Santiaguero	Kiki Valera	Cubano		Circle 9 Records

=== Second quarter ===
==== April ====
Day	Title	Artist(s)	Genre(s)	Singles	Label	
3	Rumberas	Las Migas	Flamenco		Las Migas Music	
4	Insomnio	Abraham Mateo	Latin Pop, Bachata, Europop, Vocal	"Quiero Decirte"; "Clavaíto"; "Maniaca"; "XQ Sigues Pasando :("; "Falsos Recuerdos"	Sony Music Latin	
4	Mariana e Mestrinho	Mariana Aydar and Mestrinho	Folk	"La Fuente"; "Manguara"	Brisa	
4	Bolsa Amarilla y Piedra Potente	Derby Motoreta's Burrito Kachimba	Hard rock		Primavera Labels, Universal Music Spain	
4	5	att.	Young Miko	Latin Pop	"ID"; "wiggy"; "curita"; "princess peach"	The Wave Records
4	5	Capitán Avispa (Original Motion Picture Soundtrack)	Juan Luis Guerra			Ojoye Records
Bailar	5	Sheila E.	Salsa		Sony Music Latin	
Un lugar perfecto	5	Depedro	Pop rock			
9	Batidão Tropical Vol. 2	Pabllo Vittar	Brega pop	"Pede pra Eu Ficar (Listen to Your Heart)"; "Ai Ai Ai Mega Príncipe"; "Idiota"; "Hoje à Noite (Alone)"; "Planeta de Cores (Ascolta Il Tuo Cuore)"; "Ai Que Calor"	Sony Music Latin	
11	Un Mechón de Pelo	Tini	Indie Pop	"Pa"; "Posta"; "Buenos Aires"	Sony Music Latin	
11	Childstar	Danna Paola	Electro	"XT4S1S"; "1 Trago"; "Tenemos Que Hablar"; "Aún Te Quiero"; "Atari"	Universal Mexico	
11	Nuestro Año	Los Mesoneros	Pop rock	"Dos"; "No Terminemos de Terminar"; "Despídete Bien"; "Más Tuyo"; "El Puesto es Mío"; "Tu Canción"; "Su Lado de la Cama"	SR Records	
11	Se Agradece	Los Ángeles Azules	Cumbia	"Tú y Tú"; "El Amor de Mi Vida"; "A Todos los Rumberos"; "La Cumbia Triste"	Ocesa Seitrack	
11	D Ao Vivo Maceió	Djavan	MPB		Sony Music Brasil, Luanda	
11	Paraíso Particular (Ao Vivo)	Gusttavo Lima	Sertanejo		Sony Music Brasil, Balada Eventos e Produção	
12	Realismo Mágico	Carlos Sadness	Indie Rock	"Jugo de Guayaba"; "La Ternura"; "Morrita Linda"; "Lo Que Fuera"; "Feliz Feliz"	Sony Music Spain	
12	Andenes del Tiempo	Vicente Amigo	Flamenco		Ritmo Amigo	
12	Sinfonía	Jon Plágaro	Alternative			
14	Nica	Nicole Horts	Alternative		Warner Music Mexico	
17	Tekoá	Jair Oliveira	MPB		S De Samba, Marshmelody	
17	Alcalá Norte	Alcalá Norte				
18	Baño María	Ca7riel & Paco Amoroso	Latin pop, Latin alternative	"La Que Puede, Puede"; "Dumbai"; "Agua"; "El Único"	5020 Records	
19	No Rastro de Catarina	Cátia de França	MPB		Cátia De França, Tratore	
23	Ele É Jesus - Ao Vivo	Bruna Karla	Christian		MK Music	
24	Romances Eternos	Mariachi Sol De Mexico De Jose Hernandez	Mariachi		Serenata	
25	Jet Love	Conociendo Rusia	Pop rock	"Lo Mejor"; "Te Lo Voy a Decir"	Popartdiscos Internacional	
25	Pedro Elías	Akapellah	Latin Rap		Warner Music Latina	
25	Spain Forever Again	Michel Camilo and Tomatito	Latin Jazz		Universal Music Spain	
25	Música Buena Para Días Malos	Jay Wheeler	Reggaeton	"Textos Fríos"	Linked Music, Dynamic Records, Empire	
26	Por Cesárea	Dillom	Latin Rap	"SUCIO"; "Ni Con Money"	Bohemian Groove	
26	Compita del Destino	El David Aguilar	Singer-Songwriter	"Luz de Cabeza"; "Al Capricho del Viento"; "Tuyo"; "Prieta"; "Morra"	Cascabel	
26	Funk Generation	Anitta	Favela Funk	"Funk Rave"; "Mil Veces"; "Joga pra Lua"; " Double Team"; "Grip"	Republic Records; Universal Music Latino	
26	MUEVENSE	Marc Anthony	Salsa, Bachata, Ranchera	"Ojala Te Duela"; "Punta Cana"; "Ale Ale"	Sony Music Latin	
26	El Abrazo	Rozalén	Latin pop	"Lo Tengo Claro"; "Todo lo Que Amaste"; "Tres Días en Cartagena"	Sony Music Spain	
26	a new star (1 9 9 3)	Rels B	Trap	"La Vida Sin Ti"; "Pretty GIRL"; "Un Desperdicio"	DALE PLAY Records	
26	Sakura	Saiko	Reggaeton	"Supernova"; "Polaris"; "Yo Lo Soñé"; "3 Caídas"; "Nana del Hilo Rojo"; "Ángel de la Guarda (Póstumo)"	Saikoneta	
26	A Mucha Honra	Thalía	Ranchera	"Bebé, Perdón"; "Choro"; "Troca"; "Te Va A Doler"; "CanCún"; "Para Qué Celarme"; "Silencio"	Sony Music Latin	
26	Novela	Céu	MPB	"Gerando na Alta"	Urban Jungle Records	
26	Diáspora Live Vol.1	La Vida Bohème	Rock		La Vida Bohème	
26	Los Mismos Negros	Yelsy Heredia	Traditional Tropical		INEfable Music	
26	Te Amaré	Pesado	Norteño		Warner Music Latina	
26	Historias de un Flamenco	Antonio Rey	Flamenco		El Cerrito	
26	Todos podemos Cantar 2024	Todos podemos Cantar	Children's Music		The Orchard	
26	Era uma vez	Mobi Colombo	Latin pop		Loco	
30	Aire, Aire... No Puedo Respirar	Nueva Filarmonía	Classical		Nueva Filarmonía, Naku	

==== May ====
Day	Title	Artist(s)	Genre(s)	Singles	Label	
1	Porque Puedo	Eladio Carrión	Latin Trap	"Heavyweight"	Rimas	
1	Polvo de Estrellas	Chetes featuring Calexico	Pop rock	"Por Un Amor/Melodrama"; "Volverás"; "Polvo de Estrellas"	Altafonte, Bunker Producciones	
2	Cvrbon Vrmor (C DE: G D.O.N.)	Farruko	Reggaeton		Sony Music Latin	
2	García	Kany García	Pop	"La Siguiente"; "Fuera de Servicio"; "Te Lo Agradezco"; "Una Buena Vida"; "Que Vuelva"; "En Esta Boca"; "Llorar Por Ella"	5020 Records	
2	Tropicalia	Fonseca	Tropical	"Si Tú Me Quieres"	Sony Music Latin	
2	Escrita	Nicole Zignago	Pop		Warner Music Mexico	
2	Reflexa	Danny Ocean	Latin pop	"Amor"; "Medio Friends"; "No Te Enamores de Él"; "Cero Condiciones"	Atlantic Records	
3	En Otra Vida	Nella	Pop	"Veinte Años"; "Como la Cigarra"; "Qué Bonito!"	Sony Music Latin	
3	Pausa	Leonel García	Singer-Songwriter		Sony Music Mexico	
3	Pussy Taste	La Zowi	Latin trap	"Orgasm"	Virgin Music Group	
3	Joyas Que Bailan	Ronald Borjas	Salsa		Ronald Borjas	
3	Erasmo Esteves	Erasmo Carlos	MPB		Som Livre	
8	Mi Mejor Enemigo	Viniloversus	Rock		Viniloversus Music	
8	Os Garotin de São Gonçalo	Os Garotin	Rhythm & Blues, MPB		MangoMusik, Believe	
8	El Porvenir	Ale Acosta	Electronic			
9	Concierto n° 1 Guitarra Flamenca: La Perla	Rycardo Moreno	Flamenco			
10	Jugando a Que No Pasa Nada	Grupo Frontera	Norteño	"Quédate Bebé"; "Ya Pedo Quién Sabe"; "No Hay Vato Perfecto"; "Por Qué Será"	Self-released	
10	Aún Me Sigo Encontrando	Gian Marco	Latin Pop, Ballad, Salsa	"Aún Me Sigo Encontrando"; "Contigo Hasta El Final"; "No Es Amor"; "Tú"; "Ojos Que No Ven"; "Dicen En Mi Barrio"	Enjoymusic	
10	Panorama	Reik	Ballad	"Gracias por Nada"; "Abril"; "Baja California"; "Ojos Papel"; "Vámonos a Mi Casa"	Sony Music Latin	
10	Bullerengue y Tonada	Tonada	Folk		Tambora	
10	Ontem Eu Tinha Certeza (Hoje Eu Tenho Mais)	Jovem Dionisio	Alt-Pop, Contemporary R&B		Jd Produções	
10	Cubop Lives!	Zaccai Curtis	Latin Jazz		Trrcollective	
10	Secretos	Esteman	Latin pop, Latin alternative	"Mística"; "Pornostalgia"; "Noches de Verano"; "Cartagena"	Universal Music Mexico	
14	Claude Bolling Goes Latin - Suite For Flute And Latin Music Ensemble	Carlomagno Araya, Jose Valentino & The Latin Music Ensemble	Latin jazz, Classical music		Drumit	
16	Herencia Lebón	David Lebón	Latin rock		Sony Music Argentina	
16	Lo Tengo Todo	Oscarito	Merengue		Flame Entertainment	
16	Impronta	Omar Acosta	Latin jazz		Nesso Music	
16	Dun Dun Dara	Payasitas Nifu Nifa	Nursery Rhymes, Latin Pop		Nifu Nifa Oficial	
16	Alta Fidelidad	Lagos	Latin pop		Warner Music Mexico	
16	Tembla	Hamilton De Holanda and C4 Trío	Latin jazz		Sony Music	
17	El Viaje	Luis Fonsi	Salsa, Vallenato		Universal Music Latino	
17	Sayonara	Álvaro Díaz	Reggaeton		Universal Music Latino	
17	Superhéroe Merengue	Magic Juan	Merengue		Omerta Music Group	
17	Kintsugi	Un Corazón	Christian		CanZion	
17	Night Clube Forró Latino (Volume I)	Marcelo Jeneci	Folk		Onerpm	
20	The Latin Rites	ADDA Simfònica Alicante	Classical		ARIA Classics	
23	Cuatro	Camilo	Salsa, Merengue	"La Boda"; "Sálvame"; "Una Canción de Amor para la Pulga"	Sony Music Latin	
23	The GB	Gabito Ballesteros	Regional Mexican	"Lou Lou"; "A Puro Dolor"; "El Boss"; "Sin Yolanda"	Interscope	
23	Dar Vida	Debi Nova	Latin Pop	"Baño de Luna"; "Pasajera"; "Primer Beso"; "Barco del Tiempo"	Sony Music Latin	
23	El Último Baile	Trueno	Urbano		Sony Music Latin	
23	Vallenatos Pa Enamorar	Osmar Pérez & Geño Gamez	Vallenato		Mano De Obra	
23	Un Mundo Raro	Mala Rodríguez	Pop rap	"Casi Nada"	Universal Music Latino	
23	La Caleta	La Plazuela	Electronic			
24	Grasa	Nathy Peluso	Latin rap, Latin pop	"APRENDER A AMAR"	Sony Music Latin; 5020 Records	
24	Dime Precioso	Alex Anwandter	Alt-Pop, Indie Pop, Latin Pop	"Gaucho"	5AM	
24	Momentos	Nahuel Pennisi	Latin Pop	"Tres Días"	Sony Music Latin	
24	Coexistencia	Luis Figueroa	Salsa		Sony Music Latin	
24	Tengo Algo Que Decirte	Luis Fernando Borjas	Traditional Tropical		CAE Group	
24	Agradecido Live!	Eddy Herrera	Merengue		Intermusic	
24	Que Llueva Tequila	Pepe Aguilar	Mariachi		Equinoccio	
24	Te Llevo En La Sangre	Alejandro Fernández	Mariachi		Universal Music Latino	
24	Necesito De Ti	Jesús Israel	Christian		Colibrí Music	
24	En Vivo – 100 Años de Azúcar	Celia Cruz	Salsa		Loud And Live Studios	
24	Callejón del Arte	David de Arahal	Flamenco			
26	Paisajes	Ciro Hurtado	Folk		Inti Production	
28	Pra Você, Ilza	Hermeto Pascoal	Latin Jazz		Rocinante	
28	Amaríssima	Melly	Pop		Slap, Som Livre	
29	Pandora	Ali Stone	Pop rock, Alternative Rock, Dubstep, Drum 'n' Bass, House, Latin		Ali Stone; Create Music Group	
30	The Goat	Grupo Marca Registrada	Regional Mexican		Interscope	
30	De Magia Imperfecta	Nicolle Horbath	Latin pop		Nicolle Horbath Music	
30	Diamantes	Chiquis Rivera	Banda		Fonovisa	
30	Boca Chueca, Vol. 1	Carin León	Country, Norteno, Banda	"No Sé"; "Lamentablemente"; "Aviso Importante"	Socios Music	
30	Trastornado	Michelle Maciel	Contemporary Mexican		Dale Play	
30	Raíz Nunca Me Fuí	Lila Downs, Niña Pastori, and Soledad Pastorutti	Folk		Sony Music México	
30	Perfecto	Manuel Medrano	Latin pop	"Este Cuento"	Warner Music Mexico	
30	Collab	Hamilton De Holanda and Gonzalo Rubalcaba	Latin Jazz		Sony Music Brasil	
30	Credo for Orchestra, Choir and Five Soloists	Simón Bolívar Symphony Orchestra and Simón Bolívar National Choir	Classical		El Sistema	
30	Mátense por la Corona	J Noa	Latin rap	"Era de Cristal"; "SPICY"; "Cenicienta"	Sony Music	
30	31	Voces de Mi Familia	Álex Cuba	Latin Pop, Contemporary Tropical	"Aurora"; "No Cocina Cualquiera"	Caracol Records
Figurantes	31	Vetusta Morla	Indie Rock, Alternative Rock	"Puentes"; "Catedrales"	Sony Music Latin	
Hotel Caracas	31	Mau y Ricky	Reggaeton		Warner Music Latina	
Reflejos de lo Eterno	31	Draco Rosa	Alternative Rock		Sony Music Latin	
Monte Adentro	31	Gusi	Vallenato, Cumbia		Gaira Música	
La Fiesta	31	Ilegales	Contemporary Tropical		Dotel Productions	
Imperfecto	31	El Plan	Tejano		Indepe Music	
Canto y Río	31	Martina Camargo	Folk		Chaco World Music	
¡A Cantar!	31	Danilo & Chapis	Children's Music		Moon Moosic	
Pepito y Paquito	31	Paco de Lucía & Pepe de Lucía	Flamenco			

==== June ====
Day	Title	Artist(s)	Genre(s)	Singles	Label
7	Quería Saber	Silvio Rodríguez	Singer-songwriter	"Quería Saber"; "América"	Ojaláfakr
7	La Inevitable Tentación de Ir a Contramano	Sexteto Fantasma	Tango		Sexteto Fantasma
7	Gabriela Ortiz: Revolución Diamantina	Los Angeles Philharmonic, Los Angeles Master Chorale	Classical		Platoon
10	Nueve	Massacre	Latin rock	"Insomnio"; "Ella Va"; "La Cita"	Popartdiscos Internacional
11	Love Cole Porter	Antonio Adolfo			Antonio Adolfo Music
14	Malhablado	Diamante Eléctrico	Rock	"Porcelana"; "Algo Bueno Tenía Que Tener (Bogotá)"; "Déjame Como Me Encontraste"; "LVRBOY"; "El Amor es un Juego de Perdedores"; "El Big Bang"	Diamante Eléctrico
14	Torii Yama	Dellafuente	Latin rap	"Malicia"; "Romero Santo"; "Fosforito"	MAAS
14	Quien Es Dei V	Dei V	Reggaeton, Trap		Under Water Music
20	Éxodo	Peso Pluma	Regional Mexican; Latin trap; reggaeton	"Bellakeo"; "Rompe la Dompe"; "La People II"; "Peso Completo"; "Teka"; "La Durango"; "Gimme a Second"; "Vino Tinto"	Double P
21	Viva La Musik	Jowell y Randy	Reggaeton	"Obli Se Chi" "Lagrimas" "En La Intimidad" "Si Te Pillo" "Copas"	Rimas Entertainment
21	Zeca Pagodinho - 40 Anos (Ao Vivo)	Zeca Pagodinho	Samba		AQP Produções Artisticas
21	Universo De Paixão	Natascha Falcão	Folk		Biscoito Fino
27	Miss Misogyny	Villano Antillano	Latin rap	"Clonazepamela"; "CamGirl >.<!!!"	Sony Music Latin, La Buena Fortuna
28	Time and Again	Eliane Elias	Latin jazz		Candid
28	GINGA	Lua de Santana	Funk mandelão		Lua de Santana
28	Brouwer, Erena & Others: Guitar Works	Ausiàs Parejo	Classical		Naxos

=== Third quarter ===
==== July ====
Day	Title	Artist(s)	Genre(s)	Singles	Label
4	Gotti A	Tiago PZK	Reggaeton	"Piel"; "Mi Corazón"; "De Vuelta"; "Alegría"	Warner Music Latina
5	Dos Hemisferios	Alejandro y María Laura			Altafonte
7	Cambio	Danay Suárez	Latin rap	"Dicen"; "No Temeré"	Danay Suárez
11	166	Milo J	Latin trap	"3 Pecados Desués..."	Dale Play Records
12	De Camino al Camino	Rita Payés	Latin alternative	"El Cervatillo"; "Si Entras Tú"	Sony Music Spain
12	El Diablo	Horcas	Thrash Metal	"Ciego Para Ver"; "El Infierno Que Inventás"	Popartdiscos Internacional
15	Sata 42	Bellakath			
19	Mirada	Iván Cornejo	Regional Mexican	"Aquí Te Espero"; "Dónde Estás"; "Baby Please"; "Intercambio Injusto"	Interscope
19	E o Tempo Agora Quer Voar	Alaíde Costa	Samba		Samba Rock Discos
23	Uma	Nando Reis	Rock, soul, samba		Relicário
24	Pero No Te Enamores	Fuerza Regida	Regional Mexican, EDM	"Nel"; "Secreto Victoria"; "Pero No Te Enamores"; "Fresita"	Sony Music Latin
27	Uma Estrela Misteriosa Revelará o Segredo	Nando Reis	Rock, soul, samba		Relicário

==== August ====
Day	Title	Artist(s)	Genre(s)	Singles	Label
2	Estrela	Nando Reis	Rock, soul, samba	"Daqui por Diante"; "Dois Réveillons"	Relicário
2	La última Noche Mágica en Vivo - Estadio River Plate	Tan Biónica	Latin pop	"Ella"; "Arruinarse"; "Loca"	Universal Music Argentina
2	Regresa	Camila	Latin pop, Regional Mexican	"Fugitivos"; "120"; "Incendio"; "Diamantes y Amaranto"; "Corazón en Coma"	Sony Music Latin
9	Rayo	J Balvin	Reggaeton	"El Alta"; "Polvo de tu Vida"; "Gaga"; "Doblexxó"	Capitol Records
9	Misteriosa	Nando Reis	Rock, soul, samba		Relicário
9	El Comienzo	FloyyMenor	Reggaeton	"Gata Only"; "Me Gusta"; "A Poka Luz"; "Apaga el Cel"; "Peligrosa"	UnitedMasters
12	El Show Debe Continuar	Little Jesus	Alternative music		Juan Santiago Casillas Escobedo
14	Celda 4	L-Gante	Tropical, Reggaeton	"MVP"	Warner Music Latina
16	Alma, Corazón y Salsa (Live at Gran Teatro Nacional)	Tony Succar and Mimy Succar	Tropical		Unity Entertainment
16	La Llave de Ágora	Ágora Flamenco, Manuel Ángel Rojas Llano & Antonio Ortiz Vilchez	Alternative		
19	Caju	Liniker	MPB	"Tudo"; "Caju"; "Febre"	Breu Entertainment
19	Eden	Edén Muñoz	Regional Mexican	"Money Edition"; "¿Cómo Te Fue Sin Mí?"; "Todo Me Vale Madre"; "Traigo Saldo y Ganas de Rogar"	Sony Music Mexico
22	Epistolares	Akriila	Reggaeton	"Popper!"; "Para Siempre(｡>﹏<)"	Lotus Records, Warner Music Chile
22	Incómodo	Tito Double P	Regional Mexican	"Dembow Bélico"; "La 701"; "Tendido"; "Linda"; "Primo"; "Los Cuadros"; "Ay Mamá"	Double P Records
22	La Pantera Negra	Myke Towers	Reggaeton	"Adivino"	One World International, Warner Music Latina
22	Razão Da Esperança	Paloma Possi	Christian		Sony Music Brasil
23	Pa' Tu Cuerpa	Cimafunk	Latin alternative		Mala Cabeza Records
23	Mi Amol	Anonimus	Reggaeton, Trap		GLAD Empire
23	La Novia	Christine D'Clario	Christian		Gracehouse Musice
23	Cenas Infantis	Palavra Cantada	Children's		Palavra Cantada
29	Malena Burke Canta a Meme Solis, Vol. 1	Malena Burke and Meme Solis	Traditional tropical		Burke Music
30	Palacio	Elsa y Elmar	Latin pop	"Entre las Piernas"; "Palacio <3"; "Ké Mal"	Sony Music Mexico
30	Cuba and Beyond	Chucho Valdés and Royal Quartet	Latin jazz		InnerJazz
30	Extasis	Edurne	Latin pop	"Te Quedaste Solo"; "Mil Motivos"; "Fresas & Champán"; "Nada"; "Va Por Ti"; "Mírame"; "La Culpa"; "La Playlist"	Must Producciones
30	Havana Meets Harlem	Harlem Quartet featuring Aldo López Gavilán			Red Tusk
30	Piazzolla Para Orquesta Típica	Orquesta Típica Daniel Ruggiero			Brabacam
30	Golden City	Miguel Zenón			Miel Music

==== September ====
Day	Title	Artist(s)	Genre(s)	Singles	Label
6	La Clique: Vida Rockstar (X)	Jhayco	Reggaeton	"58"	Universal Music Latino
6	Fugacidade	Janeiro	Pop		Enero
11	La Lógica del Escorpión	Charly García	Latin rock		Sony Music Argentina
13	Solo	Chencho Corleone	Reggaeton	"Un Cigarrillo" "Hora De Salir" "Good Times" "Humo" "Lo Caro y Lo Bueno"	Cerco LLC
19	Underwater	Fariana	Reggaeton	"La Última Copa"; "Dora"; "El Caballito"	La Commission
20	Túnel Acústico	Marcos Valle	MPB		Far Out Recordings
20	Uma Estrela Misteriosa Revelará o Segredo	Nando Reis	Rock, soul, samba		Relicário
20	Viva Tu	Manu Chao	Alternative rock	"Viva Tu"; "São Paulo Motoboy"; "Tu Te Vas"	Because Music
20	Primera Musa	Omar Courtz	Reggaeton	"Una Noti"; "Luces de Colores"; "Drippeo Kbron"; "Serio Con Ese Q"	Mr. 305 Records, Rimas
20	Alma de Reyna 30 Aniversario	Mariachi Reyna de Los Ángeles	Mariachi		Serenata
20	José & Durval	Chitãozinho & Xororó	Sertanejo		Serenata
20	Sisters of the Moon	Susana Gómez Vázquez	Classical		Eudora
20	Sinvergüenza	Muerdo	Alternative		
26	Candombe	Julieta Rada	Folk		Altafonte
26	Sangre Sucia	Ángeles Toledano	Flamenco		Universal Music Spain
27	Alma En Cuba	Ariel Brínguez and Iván "Melon" Lewis			Cézanne
27	Barullo	Baiuca			

=== Fourth quarter ===
==== October ====
Day	Title	Artist(s)	Genre(s)	Singles	Label
3	Undesastre	Gepe	Latin pop	"Paloma"; "Playaplaya"; "Vivo"; "21 de Enero"; "Bolero Libra"; "Mirándote"; "La Cueca del Canario"	Altafonte
4	Nueva Sinfonía sobre el Caos	León Benavente	Latin alternative	"En el Festín"; "Nada"; "La Aventura"	Laventura
4	¡Ahora!	Biznaga	Rock		
9	Bonita Resaca	84	Pop rock		
10	Elyte	Yandel	Reggaeton	"Borracho y Loco"; "Click"; "Karma"; "Caserío"; "Con Co"; "Afro"; "Háblame Claro"; "Capítulo"; "Máquina"	Warner Music Latina, La Leyenca LLC
10	Ejército de Salvación	Love of Lesbian	Latin rock	"Contradicción"; "¿Qué Vas a Saber?"; "La Hermandad"; "Tesis"; "Ejército de Salvación"; "La Champions y el Mundial"	Warner Music Spain
10	Encuentros	Becky G	Regional Mexican	"Mercedes"; "Como Diablos"; "Otro Capítulo"	Kemosabe, RCA, Sony Music Latin
11	Next	Xavi	Regional Mexican	"La Victima"; "Poco a Poco"; "Modo DND"; "La Diabla"; "Corazón de Piedra"; "Una Semana"	Interscope
11	Cante a lo Gitano	Niño del Elche	Flamenco	"Guajirillas"	Sony Music Spain
11	Rompecabezas	Paté de Fuá	Latin rock	"La Princesa Japonesa"; "Tenía Razón"	Yayo González
11	Seré Guitarra	Marta Gómez	Singer-songwriter	"Lobo"; "Señor Tiempo"; "Tiempo de Calypso"	Altafonte
11	Kaleidoscope - Contemporary Piano Music by Female Composers from Around The World	Isabel Dobarro	Classical		Grand Piano
13	Que Sea Con Suerte	Soledad	Folk		Sony Music Argentina
14	KM.0	Andrés Barrios	Flamenco		Andrés Barrios
14	R	Renee	Pop rock		Universal Music Mexico
16	Vuelve	Axel	Latin pop	"Sólo Por Hoy"; "Somos Lo Que Fuimos"; "Humano"; "Efecto Dominó"; "Un Nuevo Día"; "El Motivo"; "Vuelve"; "Abismo"	Sony Music Argentina
17	Cvrbon Vrmor	Farruko	Reggaeton		Sony Music Latin
17	Galerna	Álex Ubago	Latin pop	"Idiota"; "No Volveré a Pensar en Ti"; "Si Es Por Los Dos"; "Siete Mares"; "Yo No Te Olvido"	Warner Music Spain
17	2.1	Piso 21	Latin pop	"La Misión"; "Fichaje del Año"	Warner Music Mexico
17	Azabache	Kiki Morente	Flamenco		Universal Music Spain
18	Muchachos	La Mosca Tsé - Tsé	Latin pop	"Muchachos, Ahora Nos Volvemos a Ilusionar"	Sony Music Argentina
18	Que Sigan Llegando las Pacas	Chino Pacas	Regional Mexican	"El Gordo Trae el Mando"; "Dijeron Que No La Iba Lograr"; "Tunechi"; "Mami Chula"; "Otra Vez Pegué un Vergazo"	Geffen
18	Pique	Dora Morelenbaum	Brazilian Popular Music		Coala Records, Mr Bongo Records
18	Colinho	Maria Beraldo	Brazilian rock		Selo Risc
18	Contenido Sensible	Malva	Pop rock		Selo Risc
23	Aquí Estamos	Marcos Vidal	Christian		Heaven Music
24	Todos los Días Todo el Día	Latin Mafia	Latin alternative		Rimas Entertainment
24	Arial 12	Susana Cala	Latin pop	"Triste"; "Amnesia"; "Días de Mierda"; "Dosmil16"; "Ataque de Ansiedad"; "Paciencia"; "Se Siente Así"	ADA
24	Elige Tu Propia Aventura	Carolina Durante	Latin rock	"Elige Tu Propia Aventura"; "Joderse la Vida"; "Misil"; "Hamburguesas"	Sonido Muchacho, Universal Music Spain
24	Relatos	Ale Zéguer			Enso Music
25	Bodhiria	Judeline	Latin alternative	"Mangata"; "Inri"; "Zarcillos de Plata"	Interscope
25	La Jauría	Dani Fernández	Latin pop	"Todo Cambia"; "Criminal"; "Me Has Invitado a Bailar"; "Por No Bailar Contigo"	Warner Music Spain
25	Ignis	Vega	Pop rock		La Madriguera Records
25	Cursi	Zoe Gotusso	Latin pop	"Pensando en Ti"; "Superpoder"; "No Hay Nadie Como Tú"; "Lara"; "Voy a Olvidarme de Mi"	Sony Music Argentina
25	Real	Jon Z	Reggaeton, Trap		Warner Music Latina
25	Entre Cuatro Paredes y una Verdad	Marlena			
26	Obrigado Deus	Léo Foguete	Sertanejo		Acertei Produções
31	Ameri	Duki	Latin trap	"Barro"; "Constelación"	Dale Play Records
31	Haashville	Ha*Ash	Latin pop, Country pop	"Te Acuerdas"; "Todavía No"; "1, 2, 3 Segundos"; "El Cielo Te Mandó Para Mí"	Sony Music Mexico

==== November ====
Day	Title	Artist(s)	Genre(s)	Singles	Label	
7	La Nube en el Jardín	Ed Maverick	Folk		How es un Buen Día, Universal Music Group	
7	La Odisea	Jasiel Nuñez	Regional Mexican	"Bipolar"; "Corazón Frio"; "0 Sentimientos"; "Made in Paris"; "Miradas"	Double P	
7	En las Nubes (Con Mis Panas)	Elena Rose	Reggaeton		Warner Music Latina	
7	Tanto por Hacer	Tanto por Hacer	Pop rock		Warner Music Latina	
7	Calidosa	Mike Bahía	Bachata	"La Depre"; "Cali Buenaventura"; "Desaparecida"; "La Pena"; "Bolerito"	Warner Music Latina	
8	La Nube en el Jardín	Ed Maverick	Latin alternative		Hoy Es Un Buen Día, Universal Music Mexico	
8	Lentamente	Sílvia Pérez Cruz and Juan Falú	Folk		El Pez Cruz	
13	Pagode Da Mart'nália	Mart'nália	Samba		Sony Music Brasil	
14	PO2054AZ (Vol. II)	Sen Senra	Latin alternative		Sonido Muchacho, Universal Music Spain	
14	Génesis	Ruslana	Pop			
14	Cantares de Arcilla	Kike M	Rock			
15	Cosa Nuestra	Rauw Alejandro	Salsa, Reggaeton	"Touching the Sky"; "Déjame Entrar"; "Pasaporte"; "Qué Pasaría..."; "Khé?"; "Se Fue"; "Ni Me Conozco"	Sony Latin	
15	Todo es Posible en Navidad	David Bisbal	Christmas music	"Todo es Posible en Navidad"	Universal Music Spain	
15	Exaltado	Marco Barrientos	Christian		Heaven Music	
20	Tu Patrona de Lujo	La Joaqui	Reggaeton	"San Turrona"; "Tu Patrona"; "Chekate"	Dale Play Records	
20	Shin-Urayasu	Richard Scofano and Alfredo Minetti	Tango		Dianoia	
21	Naiki	Nicki Nicole	Reggaeton	"Forty"; "Sheite"; "We Love That Shit"	Dale Play, Sony Latin Argentina	
21	Ayer... Aún	Raphael	Latin pop	"Padam. Padam"	Virgin Music Spain	
21	Progresa Adecuadamente	Gilipojazz	Rock			
22	Exhalo	Juana Molina	Folktronica		Sonamos, Little Butterfly	
22	201	Manuel Turizo	Latin pop, Reggaeton	"De Lunes a Lunes"; "Mamasota"; "Bahamas"; "Dios Te Quise"; "Enhorabuena"; "Qué Pecao"; "Sigueme Besando Así"	La Industria Inc., Sony Music Latin	
22	Buenas Noches	Quevedo	Reggaeton	"Duro"; "Buenas Noches"	Rimas Entertainment	
22	Mazorkeo.com	Jowell y Randy	Reggaeton	"X-100"	Rimas Entertainment	
22	28	Armagedón	Humbe	Latin pop	"Kintsugi"	PARASIEMPRE
Onde Guardamos As Flores?	28	Resgate	Christian		Resgate, Onerpm	
Sentido	28	5 A Seco	MPB		Lemon Music	
La Favorita	28	LaBlackie				
Vapor y Cielo	Blackpanda					
29	Jaibol, Vol. 2	La Gusana Ciega	Latin rock	"El Pecador"; "¿Usted Qué Haría?"	Orfeón Videovox	
29	Tranqui Todo Pasa	Sech	Reggaeton	"Tus Labios"; "TOY PERDIO"; "Tarde"	Rimas Entertainment	
29	Los 9 de Ferxxo y Sky Rompiendo	Feid & Sky Rompiendo	Reggaeton	"Estoy Putiao"	Universal Music Latino	
29	Ao Vivo No Ccb: Homenagem A José Mário Branco	Camané	Fado		Warner Music Portugal	
29	Transespacial	Fitti	Folk		Cachoeira Music	
29	El Último Día de Nuestras Vidas	Dani Martín	Folk			

==== December ====
Day	Title	Artist(s)	Genre(s)	Singles	Label
5	Universo de Ley	Rosario	Latin pop	"No Dudaría"; "Cómo Quieres Que Te Quiera"; "Yo Te Daré"	Universal Music Spain
5	Palabra de To's	Carín León	Regional Mexican	"Me Está Doliendo"; "Si Tú Me Vieras"	Socios Music
5	Buscapié	Luis Pescetti and Juan Quintero	Children's music		Lmp
6	Live at Carnegie Hall	Natalia Lafourcade	Traditional pop		Sony Music Mexico
10	Manual Prático Do Novo Samba Tradicional, Vol. 1: DONA PAULETE	Marcelo D2	Samba		Pupila Dilatada, Elemes
12	Esquinas	Anavitória	Latin pop		Anavitória Artes
13	El Alma De La Fiesta	Brray	Reggaeton	"Mis Amigas" "Te Colaboro" "Mis Amigas (Remix)" "Corazon Roto (Remix)" "Corazon Roto (Pt. 3)" "Pretty Bad B*tch"	Universal Music Latino
13	Ida e Volta	Yamandu Costa			Bagual
13	Recordando a Marchena	Sandra Carrasco & David de Arahal	Flamenco		
14	Luna En Obras (En Vivo)	Carilina Bertoldi	Rock	"Costumbres Argentina"; "Tristeza de la Ciudad"; "No Te Enamores Nunca de Aquel Marinero Bengalí"	Sony Music Argentina
15	Éxtasis Total - Las Canciones de Los Abuelos de la Nada	Cachorro López	Latin rock	"Costumbres Argentina"; "Tristeza de la Ciudad"; "No Te Enamores Nunca de Aquel Marinero Bengalí"	Sony Music Argentina
19	Mala Mía	Fuerza Regida and Grupo Frontera	Cumbia, Tejano, corridos tumbados		Rancho Humilde, Street Mob, Sony Music Latin
20	Los Bunkers MTV Unplugged	Los Bunkers	Latin rock	"Ven Aquí"; "Quiero Dormir Cansado"; "Miño"; "Llueve Sobre la Ciudad"; "Rey"; "Si Estás Pensando Mal de Mi"; "El Hombre es un Continente"; "Canción Para Mañana/Al Final de Este Viaje"; "Bailando Solo/Heart of Glass"	OCESA Seitrack
20	Papi Arca	Arcangel	Reggaeton		Rimas Entertainment

== Year-End ==
=== Performance in the United States ===
==== Albums ====
The following is a list of the 10 best-performing Latin albums in the United States according to Billboard and Nielsen SoundScan, which compiles data from traditional sales and album-equivalent units.

Rank	Album	Artist
1	Nadie Sabe Lo Que Va a Pasar Mañana	Bad Bunny
2	Génesis	Peso Pluma
3	Un Verano Sin Ti	Bad Bunny
4	Pa Las Baby's y Belikeada	Fuerza Regida
5	Mañana Será Bonito	Karol G
6	$ad Boyz 4 Life II	Junior H
7	Mañana Será Bonito (Bichota Season)	Karol G
8	El Comienzo	Grupo Frontera
9	Éxodo	Peso Pluma
10	YHLQMDLG	Bad Bunny

==== Songs ====
The following is a list of the 10 best-performing Latin songs in the United States according to Billboard and Nielsen SoundScan, which compiles data from streaming activity, digital sales and radio airplay.

Rank	Single	Artist
1	"Gata Only"	FloyyMenor and Cris MJ
2	"Perro Negro"	Bad Bunny
3	"La Diabla"	Xavi
4	"Mónaco"	Bad Bunny
5	"Qlona"	Karol G and Peso Pluma
6	"Harley Quinn"	Fuerza Regida and Marshmello
7	"Si No Quieres No"	Luis R. Conriquez and Netón Vega
8	"Si Antes Te Hubiera Conocido"	Karol G
9	"Tú Name"	Fuerza Regida
10	"La Víctima"	Xavi

== Deaths ==
- January 4 – Diego Gallardo, 31, Ecuadorian singer-songwriter, shot.
- January 6 – Amparo Rubín, 68, Mexican singer and lyricist, complications from Alzheimer's disease.
- January 14 – Enrique Roizner, 84, Argentine drummer
- February 2 – Marcelo Yzurieta, 49, Argentine lead singer for Los Sacha
- February 7 – Chuy Montana, 25, Mexican singer
- February 14 – Lisa Lopez-Galvan, 43, Tejano music radio host, gunshot wounds
- February 20 – Majestic, 24, Mexican rapper
- March 7 – Pedro Altamiranda, 88, Panamanian singer and composer
- March 9 – Gabriel Ramírez, 71, Spanish banjo player
- April 3 – Muñequita Milly, 23, Peruvian folk singer, complications from surgery.
- April 13 – Lorenzo Palomo, 86, Spanish composer.
- April 16 – Clorofila, 59, Mexican producer, visual artist, and Nortec musician
- April 26 – Anderson Leonardo, 51, Brazilian singer, leader of Molejo (cancer)
- May 21 – Omar Geles, 57, Colombian vallenato singer and accordionist
- June 8 – Dr. Velasquez, 40, Colombian singer, composer, producer, manager, and businessman
- June 12 – Johnny Canales, 81, Mexican Tejano singer and television host
- July 8 – Adrián Olivares, 48, singer and former member of Menudo
- July 10 – Amaury Hernández Gil, 41, Dominican Republic Christian singer, former member of EmanuelDCN and Kabed
- July 15 – Ivana Pino Arellano, 32, Chilean country singer
- September 5 – Sérgio Mendes, 83, Brazilian bossa nova musician ("The Look of Love", "The Fool on the Hill", "Never Gonna Let You Go"), Grammy winner (1993), complications from long COVID.
- September 18 – Juan Brujo, 61, singer (Brujeria)
- October 3 – Marta Valdés, 90, Cuban singer and songwriter
- October 9 — Rudy Márquez, 81, Venezuelan singer and songwriter
- October 10 – El Taiger, 37, Cuban reggaeton singer, shot.
- October 21:
  - Egidio Cuadrado, 71, Colombian vallenato accordionist.
  - Peter Deantoni, 76, Argentine rock music manager
- October 23 – Charlie Sierra, 68, Puerto Rican timabales musician
- December 6 – Angela Alvarez, 97, Cuban-born American singer
- December 9 — Trino Mora, 81, Venezuelan singer
- December 25 – Dulce, 69, Mexican singer
