= List of Billboard Hot Latin Songs and Latin Airplay number ones of 2024 =

The Billboard Hot Latin Songs and Latin Airplay are charts that rank the best-performing Latin songs in the United States and are both published weekly by Billboard magazine. The Hot Latin Songs chart ranks the best-performing Spanish-language songs in the country based on digital downloads, streaming, and airplay from all radio stations. The Latin Airplay chart ranks the most-played songs on Spanish-language radio stations in the United States regardless of genre or language.

== Chart history ==
Chart history
Issue date	Hot Latin Songs			Latin Airplay		
Issue date	Title	Artist(s)	Ref.	Title	Artist(s)	Ref.
January 6	"La Diabla"	Xavi		"Según Quién"	Maluma and Carín León	
January 13	"La Diabla"	Xavi		"Bubalú"	Feid and Rema	
January 20	"La Diabla"	Xavi		"Bubalú"	Feid and Rema	
January 27	"Igual Que Un Ángel"	Kali Uchis and Peso Pluma		"Monaco"	Bad Bunny	
February 3	"La Diabla"	Xavi		"Harley Quinn"	Fuerza Regida and Marshmello	
February 10	"La Diabla"	Xavi		"La Diabla"	Xavi	
February 17	"La Diabla"	Xavi		"Borracho y Loco"	Yandel and Myke Towers	
February 24	"La Diabla"	Xavi		"La Falda"	Myke Towers	
March 2	"La Diabla"	Xavi		"Qlona"	Karol G and Peso Pluma	
March 9	"La Diabla"	Xavi		"Por el Contrario"	Becky G with Leonardo Aguilar and Ángela Aguilar	
March 16	"La Diabla"	Xavi		"No Es Normal"	Venesti, Nacho and Maffio	
March 23	"La Diabla"	Xavi		"La Diabla"	Xavi	
March 30	"La Diabla"	Xavi		"Baccarat"	Ozuna	
April 6	"La Diabla"	Xavi		"Puntería"	Shakira and Cardi B	
April 13	"La Diabla"	Xavi		"TQMQA"	Eladio Carrión	
April 20	"Gata Only"	FloyyMenor and Cris MJ		"Perro Negro"	Bad Bunny and Feid	
April 27	"Gata Only"	FloyyMenor and Cris MJ		"Cosas de la Peda"	Prince Royce and Gabito Ballesteros	
May 4	"Gata Only"	FloyyMenor and Cris MJ		"Luna"	Feid and ATL Jacob	
May 11	"Gata Only"	FloyyMenor and Cris MJ		"Luna"	Feid and ATL Jacob	
May 18	"Gata Only"	FloyyMenor and Cris MJ		"(Entre Paréntesis)"	Shakira and Grupo Frontera	
May 25	"Gata Only"	FloyyMenor and Cris MJ		"La Capi"	Myke Towers	
June 1	"Gata Only"	FloyyMenor and Cris MJ		"Si Sabe Ferxxo"	Blessd and Feid	
June 8	"Gata Only"	FloyyMenor and Cris MJ		"Cobijas Ajenas"	Alejandro Fernández and Alfredo Olivas	
June 15	"Gata Only"	FloyyMenor and Cris MJ		"Amor"	Danny Ocean	
June 22	"Gata Only"	FloyyMenor and Cris MJ		"Sabor a Michelada"	El Fantasma	
June 29	"Gata Only"	FloyyMenor and Cris MJ		"Igual Que Un Ángel"	Kali Uchis and Peso Pluma	
July 6	"Gata Only"	FloyyMenor and Cris MJ		"Te Va a Doler"	Thalía and Grupo Firme	
July 13	"Gata Only"	FloyyMenor and Cris MJ		"El Beneficio de la Duda"	Grupo Firme	
July 20	"Gata Only"	FloyyMenor and Cris MJ		"Perdonarte, ¿Para Qué?"	Los Ángeles Azules and Emilia	
July 27	"Si Antes Te Hubiera Conocido"	Karol G		"Si Antes Te Hubiera Conocido"	Karol G	
August 3	"Si Antes Te Hubiera Conocido"	Karol G		"Si Antes Te Hubiera Conocido"	Karol G	
August 10	"Si Antes Te Hubiera Conocido"	Karol G		"Si Antes Te Hubiera Conocido"	Karol G	
August 17	"Si Antes Te Hubiera Conocido"	Karol G		"Si Antes Te Hubiera Conocido"	Karol G	
August 24	"Si Antes Te Hubiera Conocido"	Karol G		"Si Antes Te Hubiera Conocido"	Karol G	
August 31	"Si Antes Te Hubiera Conocido"	Karol G		"Si Antes Te Hubiera Conocido"	Karol G	
September 7	"Si Antes Te Hubiera Conocido"	Karol G		"Si Antes Te Hubiera Conocido"	Karol G	
September 14	"Si Antes Te Hubiera Conocido"	Karol G		"Si Antes Te Hubiera Conocido"	Karol G	
September 21	"Si Antes Te Hubiera Conocido"	Karol G		"Si Antes Te Hubiera Conocido"	Karol G	
September 28	"Si Antes Te Hubiera Conocido"	Karol G		"Si Antes Te Hubiera Conocido"	Karol G	
October 5	"Si Antes Te Hubiera Conocido"	Karol G		"Si Antes Te Hubiera Conocido"	Karol G	
October 12	"Si Antes Te Hubiera Conocido"	Karol G		"Si Antes Te Hubiera Conocido"	Karol G	
October 19	"Si Antes Te Hubiera Conocido"	Karol G		"Si Antes Te Hubiera Conocido"	Karol G	
October 26	"Si Antes Te Hubiera Conocido"	Karol G		"Si Antes Te Hubiera Conocido"	Karol G	
November 2	"Tu Boda"	Óscar Maydon and Fuerza Regida		"Si Antes Te Hubiera Conocido"	Karol G	
November 9	"Tu Boda"	Óscar Maydon and Fuerza Regida		"Si Antes Te Hubiera Conocido"	Karol G	
November 16	"Tu Boda"	Óscar Maydon and Fuerza Regida		"Si Antes Te Hubiera Conocido"	Karol G	
November 23	"Tu Boda"	Óscar Maydon and Fuerza Regida		"Si Antes Te Hubiera Conocido"	Karol G	
November 30	"Tu Boda"	Óscar Maydon and Fuerza Regida		"Si Antes Te Hubiera Conocido"	Karol G	
December 7	"Tu Boda"	Óscar Maydon and Fuerza Regida		"Si Antes Te Hubiera Conocido"	Karol G	
December 14	"Tu Boda"	Óscar Maydon and Fuerza Regida		"Si Antes Te Hubiera Conocido"	Karol G	
December 21	"Tu Boda"	Óscar Maydon and Fuerza Regida		"Si Antes Te Hubiera Conocido"	Karol G	
December 28	"Tu Boda"	Óscar Maydon and Fuerza Regida		"Si Antes Te Hubiera Conocido"	Karol G	

== Hot Latin Songs weeks at number one ==
=== Songs ===
Number of weeks	Song	Artist(s)
14	"La Diabla"	Xavi
14	"Gata Only"	FloyyMenor and Cris Mj
14	"Si Antes Te Hubiera Conocido"	Karol G
9	"Tu Boda"	Óscar Maydon and Fuerza Regida
1	"Igual Que Un Ángel"	Kali Uchis and Peso Pluma

=== Artists ===
Number of weeks	Artist	Number of songs
14	Xavi	1
14	FloyyMenor	1
14	Cris Mj	1
14	Karol G	1
9	Óscar Maydon	1
9	Fuerza Regida	1
1	Kali Uchis	1
1	Peso Pluma	1

== See also ==
- 2024 in Latin music
- List of artists who reached number one on the U.S. Latin Songs chart
- List of number-one Billboard Latin Albums from the 2020s
