= List of number-one hits of 2024 (Switzerland) =

This is a list of the Swiss Hitparade number-one hits of 2024.

== Swiss charts ==
Issue date	Song	Artist	Album	Artist
7 January	"Wonderful Life"	6PM Records featuring Luciano, Hurts and Sira	Loch dür Zyt	Züri West
14 January	"Time"	Luciano	Loch dür Zyt	Züri West
21 January	"Yes, And?"	Ariana Grande	American Dream	21 Savage
28 January	"Greedy"	Tate McRae	Loch dür Zyt	Züri West
4 February	"Lose Control"	Teddy Swims	Chambre 140	PLK
11 February	"Beautiful Things"	Benson Boone	Am Endi wird alles guet	L Loko and Drini
18 February	"Beautiful Things"	Benson Boone	Vultures 1	Kanye West and Ty Dolla Sign
25 February	"Beautiful Things"	Benson Boone	Pyramide	Werenoi
3 March	"Beautiful Things"	Benson Boone	Seductive	Luciano
10 March	"Beautiful Things"	Benson Boone	2024: On a 35 ans!	Les Enfoirés
17 March	"Beautiful Things"	Benson Boone	Invincible Shield	Judas Priest
24 March	"Beautiful Things"	Benson Boone	Schwiizer Chinderlieder 1	Schwiizergoofe
31 March	"Beautiful Things"	Benson Boone	We Don't Trust You	Future and Metro Boomin
7 April	"I Like the Way You Kiss Me"	Artemas	Cowboy Carter	Beyoncé
14 April	"I Like the Way You Kiss Me"	Artemas	Cowboy Carter	Beyoncé
21 April	"Gata Only"	FloyyMenor and Cris MJ	One Deep River	Mark Knopfler
28 April	"Gata Only"	FloyyMenor and Cris MJ	The Tortured Poets Department	Taylor Swift
5 May	"Gata Only"	FloyyMenor and Cris MJ	The Tortured Poets Department	Taylor Swift
12 May	"Gata Only"	FloyyMenor and Cris MJ	The Tortured Poets Department	Taylor Swift
19 May	"The Code"	Nemo	Shalala	Calimeros
26 May	"The Code"	Nemo	Hit Me Hard and Soft	Billie Eilish
2 June	"Gata Only"	FloyyMenor and Cris MJ	Hit Me Hard and Soft	Billie Eilish
9 June	"Houdini"	Eminem	Hit Me Hard and Soft	Billie Eilish
16 June	"Houdini"	Eminem	Forever	Bon Jovi
23 June	"Gata Only"	FloyyMenor and Cris MJ	2000	Pashanim
30 June	"Gata Only"	FloyyMenor and Cris MJ	Hit Me Hard and Soft	Billie Eilish
7 July	"Gata Only"	FloyyMenor and Cris MJ	Loom	Imagine Dragons
14 July	"Gata Only"	FloyyMenor and Cris MJ	The Tortured Poets Department	Taylor Swift
21 July	"Gata Only"	FloyyMenor and Cris MJ	The Death of Slim Shady (Coup de Grâce)	Eminem
28 July	"Gata Only"	FloyyMenor and Cris MJ	=1	Deep Purple
4 August	"Move"	Adam Port and Stryv featuring Malachiii	Weisch du no?	ChueLee
11 August	"Move"	Adam Port and Stryv featuring Malachiii	Still King	Kollegah
18 August	"Move"	Adam Port and Stryv featuring Malachiii	Hit Me Hard and Soft	Billie Eilish
25 August	"Move"	Adam Port and Stryv featuring Malachiii	In Liebe	Ayliva
1 September	"Move"	Adam Port and Stryv featuring Malachiii	Short n' Sweet	Sabrina Carpenter
8 September	"Move"	Adam Port and Stryv featuring Malachiii	Wild God	Nick Cave and the Bad Seeds
15 September	"The Emptiness Machine"	Linkin Park	Luck and Strange	David Gilmour
22 September	"The Emptiness Machine"	Linkin Park	Luck and Strange	David Gilmour
29 September	"The Emptiness Machine"	Linkin Park	13	Schwiizergoofe
6 October	"The Emptiness Machine"	Linkin Park	À la vie à la mort	SDM
13 October	"The Emptiness Machine"	Linkin Park	Moon Music	Coldplay
20 October	"Die with a Smile"	Lady Gaga and Bruno Mars	Easy Muni	Stubete Gäng
27 October	"Die with a Smile"	Lady Gaga and Bruno Mars	Andrea Berg	Andrea Berg
3 November	"Die with a Smile"	Lady Gaga and Bruno Mars	Chromakopia	Tyler, the Creator
10 November	"Die with a Smile"	Lady Gaga and Bruno Mars	Songs of a Lost World	The Cure
17 November	"Die with a Smile"	Lady Gaga and Bruno Mars	Jahreszyte	Heimweh
24 November	"The Emptiness Machine"	Linkin Park	From Zero	Linkin Park
1 December	"All I Want for Christmas Is You"	Mariah Carey	From Zero	Linkin Park
8 December	"All I Want for Christmas Is You"	Mariah Carey	From Zero	Linkin Park
15 December	"All I Want for Christmas Is You"	Mariah Carey	Jvlivs III: Ad Finem	SCH
22 December	"All I Want for Christmas Is You"	Mariah Carey	From Zero	Linkin Park
29 December	"All I Want for Christmas Is You"	Mariah Carey	Christmas	Michael Bublé
