= A Tu Manera =

2024 single by Junior H and Peso Pluma

Single by Junior H and Peso Pluma
- Released: 16 February 2024
- Genre: Bachata
- Length: 4:21
- Label: Rancho Humilde; Warner Latina
- Songwriter: Oscar Garza Hernandez
- Producer: Jimmy Humilde

Peso Pluma singles chronology
"Rompe la Dompe" (2023)	"A Tu Manera" (2024)	"Un Desperdicio" (2024)

Peso Pluma singles chronology
"Igual que un Ángel" (2024)	"A Tu Manera" (2024)	"No Son Klle" (2024)

Music video
- "A Tu Manera" on YouTube

"A Tu Manera" is a single by Mexican singers Junior H and Peso Pluma, released on 16 February 2024 alongside a music video. The song was written by Oscar Garza Hernandez and produced by Jimmy Humilde.

== Composition ==
The song features a bachata-inspired rhythm with bolero-esque guitar chords. Lyrically, it centers on unrequited love and a relationship that ended. The singers croon about having a strong passion to pursue a relationship with a partner and being willing to do it on their terms. Junior H pleads his lover to think twice before setting boundaries. It is believed that the song is aimed at Argentine rapper Nicki Nicole, Peso Pluma's ex-girlfriend; certain lyrics reference Nicole's comments about Peso Pluma during an interview with radio host Molusco, in which she denied their relationship and comparing it to walking with a dog.

== Music video ==
The music video was directed by Jessy Terrero. In it, Junior H drives and later sits in a bar alone with a drink for himself. The clip also shows a video of a woman dancing that is projected to a building, as well as a group of women in black outfits performing a theatrical dance.

== Charts ==
Chart performance for "A Tu Manera"
Chart (2024)	Peak position
Global 200 (Billboard)	128
Mexico (Billboard)	11
US Bubbling Under Hot 100 (Billboard)	3
US Hot Latin Songs (Billboard)	12

== Certifications ==
Region	Certification	Certified units/sales
United States (RIAA)	4× Platinum (Latin)	240,000^{‡}
^{‡} Sales+streaming figures based on certification alone.
