= Después de la 1 =

2024 single by Cris MJ and FloyyMenor

Song by Cris MJ, FloyyMenor and Louki

from the EP MJ
- Language: Spanish
- Released: 12 September 2024
- Genre: Reggaeton
- Length: 2:57
- Label: Sonar
- Songwriters: Christopher Andrés Álvarez García; Alan Felipe Galleguillos
- Producers: Louki; Retumblica

Music video
- "Después de la 1" on YouTube

"Después de la 1" is a song by Chilean rappers Cris MJ and FloyyMenor and Chilean producer duo Louki. It was released by Sonar on 12 September 2024, along with "Déjame Pensar" as part of Cris MJ and FloyyMenor's collaborative extended play MJ (2024). In both artists' home country Chile,

== Background ==
In early September 2024, FloyyMenor announced that two songs in collaboration with Cris MJ would be released on 12 September 2024.

== Composition ==
The song was written by Cris MJ and FloyyMenor and produced by Louki and Retumblica. In the lyrics, FloyyMenor makes reference to Cris MJ's song "Una Noche en Medellín" as much as Cris MJ to their world-famous collaboration "Gata Only". Cris MJ also mentioned fellow reggaeton female artists Natti Natasha and Karol G.

== Commercial performance ==
"Después de la 1" debuted at number 13 on the Hot Latin Songs chart dated 21 September 2024. The song also debuted at number 105 on the Billboard Global 200 on the issue dated 21 September 2024. On the song chart in Spain, it debuted at the 42nd position. It also appeared in top 20 in Peru.

== Music video ==
The music video for "Después de la 1" was released on 12 September 2024, along with the release of the music video for "Déjame Pensar". It was published in Cris MJ's YouTube channel and was produced by Javi Rivas, the song in the video version has a different rhythm than the Spotify version, also in the Frikitona part.

== Charts ==
Chart performance for "Después de la 1"
Chart (2024)	Peak position
Chile (Billboard)	1
Global 200 (Billboard)	53
Peru (Billboard)	19
Spain (PROMUSICAE)	14
US Bubbling Under Hot 100 (Billboard)	14
US Hot Latin Songs (Billboard)	13
