= Peligrosa (FloyyMenor song) =

2024 song by FloyyMenor

Single by FloyyMenor

from the EP El Comienzo
- Language: Spanish
- English title: Dangerous
- Released: July 13, 2024
- Genre: Reggaeton
- Length: 2:14
- Label: UnitedMasters
- Songwriter: Alan Felipe Cepeda
- Producer: FloyyMenor

FloyyMenor singles chronology
"Apaga el Cel" (2024)	"Peligrosa" (2024)	"Tu Ta Rica" (2024)

Music video
- "Peligrosa" on YouTube

"Peligrosa" (transl. "Dangerous") is a song by Chilean rapper FloyyMenor. It was released by UnitedMasters on July 13, 2024, as the fifth single from FloyyMenor's debut EP, El Comienzo (2024). The song was written and produced by FloyyMenor himself. In the artist's home country Chile, the song finished at number 2 on the Billboard chart dated September 21, 2024.

== Background ==
On August 9, 2024, FloyyMenor released his debut extended play, El Comienzo, and "Peligrosa" was included as the fifth track.

== Commercial performance ==
"Peligrosa" debuted at number 48 on the Hot Latin Songs chart dated September 14, 2024, and would reach its peak at number 25 in its second week. The song also debuted at number 129 on the Billboard Global 200 on the issue dated September 14, 2024, but would reach its peak at number 85 in its second week. On the song chart in Spain, it debuted at the 81st position, before reaching the fourth position in its eight week on the chart and was also certified gold in the country. It also peaked in top 20 in Peru and at number 23 in Ecuador.

== Music video ==
The music video for "Peligrosa" was released on July 13, 2024, in FloyyMenor's YouTube channel and was directed by Ignacio Cruz.

== Charts ==
Chart performance for "Peligrosa"
Chart (2024–2025)	Peak position
Argentina (Argentina Hot 100)	25
Chile (Billboard)	2
Global 200 (Billboard)	72
Ecuador (Billboard)	23
Greece International (IFPI)	43
Italy (FIMI)	56
Morocco (Hit Radio)	20
Peru (Billboard)	15
Spain (PROMUSICAE)	4
Switzerland (Schweizer Hitparade)	52
US Hot Latin Songs (Billboard)	25

== Certifications ==
Certifications and sales for "Peligrosa"
Region	Certification	Certified units/sales
Italy (FIMI)	Platinum	200,000^{‡}
Spain (Promusicae)	2× Platinum	120,000^{‡}
United States (RIAA)	Gold	500,000^{‡}
Streaming
Greece (IFPI Greece)	Gold	1,000,000^{†}
^{‡} Sales+streaming figures based on certification alone.^{†} Streaming-only figures based on certification alone.
