= Gata Only =

2024 single by FloyyMenor and Cris MJ

Single by FloyyMenor and Cris MJ

from the EP El Comienzo
- Language: Spanish
- Written: 2023
- Released: 2 February 2024
- Genre: Reggaeton
- Length: 3:42
- Label: UnitedMasters
- Songwriters: Christopher Andrés Álvarez García; Alan Felipe Galleguillos
- Producer: Big Cvyu

FloyyMenor singles chronology
"Que Quieres?" (2024)	"Gata Only" (2024)	"Me Gusta" (2024)

Cris MJ singles chronology
"+ Paca Más Elástico" (2023)	"Gata Only" (2024)	"Ke La Castiguen" (2024)

Music video
- "Gata Only" on YouTube

"Gata Only" is a song by Chilean singers FloyyMenor and Cris MJ. It was independently released via UnitedMasters on 2 February 2024, as the lead single from the former's debut EP, El Comienzo. A solo version by FloyyMenor was released on 21 December 2023, but was later removed to make space for the duet with Cris MJ. A remix version of the song, featuring Puerto Rican singer Ozuna and Brazilian singer Anitta without Cris MJ, was released on 7 June 2024.

FloyyMenor wrote "Gata Only" between live performances in Chile while reflecting on a past relationship. He waited until he turned 18 years old to release the track. After acknowledging the track, Cris MJ contributed an additional verse for the duet version, with production handled by Big Cvyu. It is a reggaeton track characterized by upbeat rhythms and lyrics about pursuing a woman. At first, the track received negative feedback from fans, leading to Cris MJ announcing plans to delete the track, then republishing the solo version as its replacement. However, these plans were cancelled after other fans convinced him otherwise. The song subsequently went viral in both singers' home country, re-entering the Chile Songs chart at number one.

"Gata Only" was commercially successful, driven by the song's virality on TikTok. It topped the national charts in 22 countries, including Chile. It peaked at number 27 on the US Billboard Hot 100, marking FloyyMenor's first chart entry and Cris MJ's second, as well as number four on the Billboard Global 200 chart. The song has received several certifications, including a diamond certification in France, quintiple platinum in Spain, triple platinum in Greece, Italy and the United States, and platinum in Belgium. As of April 2026, "Gata Only" has amassed over four billion streams worldwide, additionally reaching a milestone of two billion streams on Spotify.

== Background and composition ==
"Gata Only"
A 23-second sample of "Gata Only", specifically demonstrating its refrain sung by Álvarez.

Galleguillos, who is from Vicuña, Chile, rose to local prominence in his home country prior to releasing "Gata Only", with one of his hit singles being "Pa la Europa". He wrote "Gata Only" around early 2023 in between live performances in a different region in Chile, while missing someone they were in a relationship with. Although he wrote it at that time, he did not release the song immediately because his musical style was different and he did not find an appropriate time to release it. He waited until he aged 18 years old and would later release the song in December 2023 through UnitedMasters, where it would then receive the attention of Cris MJ, when he reached out to Galleguillos and told him that he acknowledged the song and wanted to be part of it, originally proposing a remix version of it.

Produced by Big Cvyu, "Gata Only" is an upbeat reggaeton song that lyrically talks about going after an attractive woman and "kidnapping" her, just to stay with her forever. In the title, the word "Gata" is in Spanish for "cat" but is used in the Latin urban genre to refer to women; its inclusion of "Only" in the title means that the woman both singers are singing about is unique. Gerardo Mejia, who is the Latin A&R lead of UnitedMasters, stated that the lyrics "talk about TikTok, about likes, [and] about following" and that he thinks that "[Galleguillos] hit something that resonates with the kids". The song's refrain went viral; it includes "Mami, te siento lejo', dime dónde estás / Te quiero chingar, te voy a raptar", which translates to "Baby, I feel you far, tell me where you are / I want to fuck you, I'm going to kidnap you".

== Release ==
FloyyMenor released his solo version of "Gata Only" independently via UnitedMasters on 21 December 2023, but was removed days later to make space for the release of its remix version with Álvarez. The official duet version was also independently released via the same distributor on 2 February 2024, serving as the lead single from the former's debut EP El Comienzo. An accompanying music video starring both singers was released on the same day, which sees Álvarez driving a car to a house and Galleguillos, who is also seen in the car, sending a message to a woman. Throughout the video, both singers and several women are seen in various scenes, near a swimming pool, inside a house, and driving a car.

Upon release, the song received a mixed reception from users, who pointed out that Álvarez's part had too much reverb or thought the use of artificial intelligence was involved. A day after the song's release, Álvarez took to Instagram that the duet would be deleted and replaced with a version sung by Galleguillos only, adding that his fans are "in charge". Nonetheless, the duet stayed on platforms after being convinced by fans, who also sent comments on their YouTube channel to keep the song on platforms. By May 2024, the music video amassed over 135 million views, and would also be the number-one trending music video worldwide on YouTube, as well as in Chile.

== Critical reception ==
"Gata Only" was received well by several publications, who named it as one of the songs of the summer and of 2024 in mid-year lists. It was named as the number one global song of the summer on the social platform TikTok, while it was named as the tenth global song by Billboard. It was named as the 46th best song of 2024 in a mid-year list by Rolling Stone, who called it "one of the summer’s most inescapable club bangers", while it was named the 19th best song of the year overall, with an author from the publication acknowledging the song's virality and global impact.

The song also earned two nominations at the 2024 MTV MIAW Awards, a ceremony that celebrates the most popular music, digital, and social trends across Latin America. The track was recognized in the categories of Viral Anthem, highlighting its massive popularity and cultural impact across social media platforms, and Supreme Perreo, celebrating its infectious beat and influence on dance culture. The song won the award of Global 200 Latin Song of the Year at the 2024 Billboard Latin Music Awards, while it was nominated for Hot Latin Song of the Year and its Vocal Collaboration award.

Critics' rankings of "Gata Only"
Publication	List	Rank	Ref.
Billboard	Global Songs of the Summer 2024	10	
Rolling Stone	The 100 Best Songs of 2024	19	
Rolling Stone	The 25 Best Spanish-Language Songs of 2024	1	
Spotify	2024 Global Songs of Summer	15	
Spotify	Top Tracks of 2024 Global	4	
TikTok	Global Songs of the Summer	1	
TikTok	Top Global Songs of 2024	1	

Awards and nominations for "Gata Only"
Year	Organization	Category	Result	Ref.
2024	Billboard Latin Music Awards	Global 200 Latin Song of the Year	Won	
2024	Billboard Latin Music Awards	Hot Latin Song of the Year	Nominated	
2024	Billboard Latin Music Awards	Hot Latin Song of the Year, Vocal Event	Nominated	
2024	Billboard Music Awards	Top Latin Song of the Year	Won	
2024	MTV MIAW Awards	Viral Anthem	Nominated	
2024	MTV MIAW Awards	Supreme Perreo	Nominated	
2024	NRJ Music Awards	Social Hit	Pending	
2024	Musa Awards	Song of the Year	Nominated	
2024	Musa Awards	Collaboration of the Year	Nominated	

== Commercial performance ==
=== North America ===
In the United States, "Gata Only" debuted at number eight on the Billboard Bubbling Under Hot 100 chart on the issue dated 23 March 2024. It eventually debuted at number 98 on the Billboard Hot 100 with 5.1 million official streams, becoming Álvarez's second entry (after "Una Noche en Medellín") and Galleguillos' first entry on the chart. It would peak at number 27 in its fifth week on the chart with 14.1 million US streams, despite receiving no radio in its early weeks. On 26 June 2025, "Gata Only" received a triple-platinum certification by the Recording Industry Association of America (RIAA) for certified sales of three million units based on sales and streaming figures in the country.

On the Hot Latin Songs chart, "Gata Only" reached its peak position of number one on the chart in its seventh week. It became the first Chilean song since 1999 to reach the chart's top 10, the first number-one song by a Chilean artist since 1990 and the first Chilean song to remain atop the chart for 14 consecutive weeks. Because of its performance on the chart, "Gata Only" was revealed to be the top song on the Hot Latin Songs year-end chart. On other Latin music charts, it peaked atop the Latin Digital Song Sales and Latin Streaming Songs charts. It also peaked at number five on the Latin Airplay chart.

On the Canadian Hot 100, "Gata Only" debuted at number 41, and nine weeks later would reach its peak of number 31. It charted a total of twenty weeks in the country before going recurrent. In Mexico, "Gata Only" debuted at 25, shooting to number 7 in its second week and eventually reaching its peak of number 2. It would spend seventeen weeks in the top 5 and twenty-five consecutive weeks in the top 10. Elsewhere in North America, "Gata Only" charted in Costa Rica (3), El Salvador (11), Guatemala (14), Honduras (19), Nicaragua (3), Panama (3), and Puerto Rico (17), Additionally, it peaked at number eight in Central America's airplay chart and at number three on the Latin America Latino airplay chart, both published by Monitor Latino,

=== Other territories ===
In both singers' native country Chile, "Gata Only" debuted at number 22 and reached its chart's eighth position on the issue dated 27 January 2024, before disappearing from the chart for two weeks following its removal from streaming services. It later re-entered the chart at a peak of number one, spending 9 weeks at the top. On the Argentina Hot 100, "Gata Only" debuted at 76, shooting to number 8 in its third week and eventually peaking at number 3, spending seventeen weeks in the top 10 "Gata Only" peaked atop the national charts in Bolivia (for three weeks) and in Peru (for one week). In other South American countries, it charted in Colombia (7), Ecuador (2), Paraguay (9), and Uruguay (12).

In Europe, "Gata Only" peaked atop national charts in France, Greece, Luxembourg, and Switzerland. In the United Kingdom, "Gata Only" peaked at 58 on the UK singles chart, charting eighteen total weeks in the country and being the only Latin song to enter the chart in 2024, later receiving a gold certification for selling 400,000 units in the country. In Spain, the song debuted at 72 and rose to 17 in its second week before peaking at number 3 in its ninth week. It would receive a quintiple-platinum certification for selling 500,000 units in the country. In Italy, the song peaked at number 5, and it was certified triple platinum for selling 300,000 units in the country, along with a diamond certification in France and a platinum certification in Belgium.

In Africa, "Gata Only" peaked at number 5 on the official MENA chart, additionally peaking at number 3 on the regional North Africa chart. In Asia, the song topped Turkey's International Airplay chart, and additionally charted in India (19), Saudi Arabia (12), and the United Arab Emirates (12).

=== Global ===
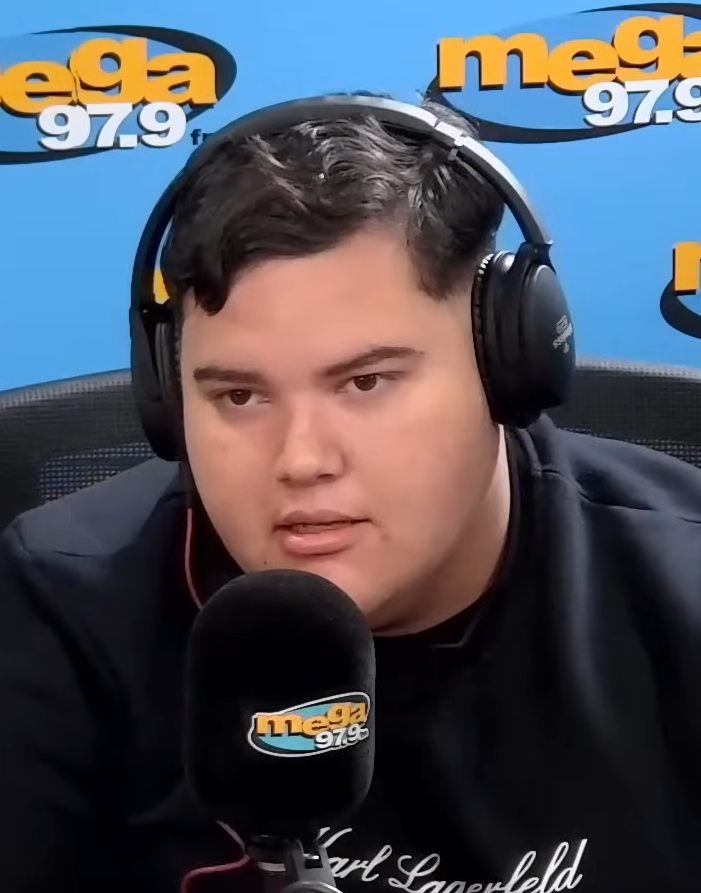
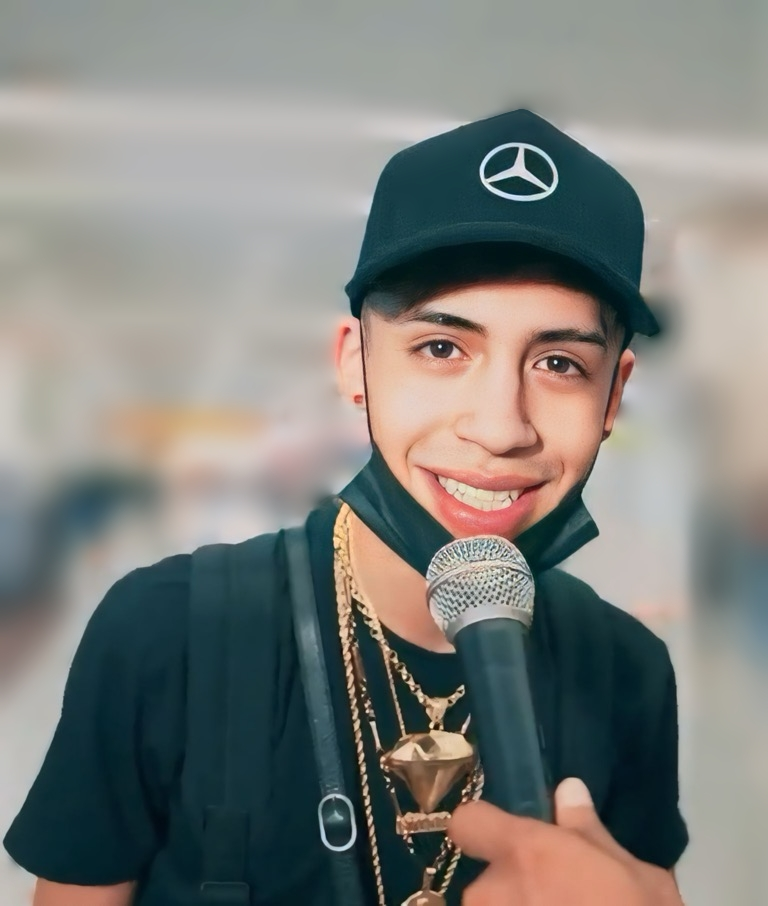
FloyyMenor (left, pictured in 2024) and Cris MJ (right, pictured in 2022) earned their first top 10 single on the Billboard Global 200 chart.

"Gata Only" debuted at number 149 on the Billboard Global 200 on the issue dated 24 February 2024. In its ninth week, the song would reach the sixth position on the chart, which became both singers' first top 10 single. later peaking at number four. On the Billboard Global Excl. US, "Gata Only" also appeared at number 174 on the issue dated 17 February 2024. It would reach its peak on the chart at number three in its 12th week, before descending and remaining at number four on the issues dated 11 May and 18 May 2024. It would descend to number five in its 15th and 16th week on the chart, before ascending back to number three in its 17th week.

On Luminate's 2024 mid-year music report, "Gata Only" was ranked as the fifth most-streamed song globally by overall on-demand audio streaming volume, achieving 982 million on-demand subscription streams between January 1 and July 1, 2024, across music platforms. Additionally, it is the only Latin song that appeared within the list's top 10. In September, Billboard announced "Gata Only" as the 10th most consumed song globally during the summer of 2024, across sales and on-demand streaming figures. The song was also crowned the number one song of the summer globally on the social media platform TikTok, accumulating over 15 million videos within the period. The platform named it "the biggest Latin track in the world this year" due to its groundbreaking success and viral impact across every corner of the globe.

==== Streaming figures ====
"Gata Only" first appeared on the Spotify global chart on February 10, eventually entering the top 10 of the platform's chart 1 month later with 3,909,830 streams. It would reach a peak of number two on the chart, with 8,628,580 streams in a single day. The song reached number one on the Spotify charts designated for Argentina, Chile, Italy, France, Peru, Ecuador, Switzerland, Bolivia, Uruguay, Paraguay, El Salvador, Honduras, Nicaragua, and Luxembourg.

"Gata Only" would amass over 859 million streams as of July 2024, dismissing "Una Noche en Medellín" to become the most-streamed song by a Chilean artist on Spotify. On August 9, it became the fastest Latin song in the platform to surpass 1 billion streams, dethroning "Quevedo: Bzrp Music Sessions, Vol. 52", and the 10th fastest song overall, accomplishing this within 190 days. Additionally, it became the first song by a Chilean artist to attain 1 billion streams, as well as the third song released in 2024 to achieve this after Benson Boone's "Beautiful Things" and Sabrina Carpenter's "Espresso". As of April 2026, the song has earned over four billion streams combined from various music streaming platforms worldwide, and had additionally surpassed two billion streams on Spotify.

== Charts ==
=== Weekly charts ===
Weekly chart performance for "Gata Only"
Chart (2024–2025)	Peak position
Argentina Hot 100 (Billboard)	3
Argentina (CAPIF)	2
Austria (Ö3 Austria Top 40)	6
Belgium (Ultratop 50 Flanders)	39
Belgium (Ultratop 50 Wallonia)	5
Bolivia (Billboard)	1
Canada (Canadian Hot 100)	31
Central America Airplay (Monitor Latino)	8
Chile (Billboard)	1
Chile Airplay (Monitor Latino)	3
Chile Streaming (PROFOVI)	1
CIS Airplay (TopHit)	161
Colombia (Billboard)	7
Colombia Airplay (Monitor Latino)	14
Colombia Airplay (National-Report)	11
Costa Rica Airplay (Monitor Latino)	9
Costa Rica Streaming (FONOTICA)	3
Czech Republic Singles Digital (ČNS IFPI)	26
Ecuador (Billboard)	2
Ecuador Urbano Airplay (Monitor Latino)	11
El Salvador Airplay (ASAP EGC)	7
El Salvador Airplay (Monitor Latino)	11
France (SNEP)	1
Germany (GfK)	17
Global 200 (Billboard)	4
Greece International (IFPI)	1
Guatemala Airplay (Monitor Latino)	14
Honduras Airplay (Monitor Latino)	19
Hungary (Single Top 40)	18
India International (IMI)	7
Ireland (IRMA)	46
Israel (Mako Hitlist)	22
Italy (FIMI)	5
Latin America Latino Airplay (Monitor Latino)	3
Lebanon Airplay (Lebanese Top 20)	6
Lithuania (AGATA)	10
Lithuania Airplay (TopHit)	65
Luxembourg (Billboard)	1
Middle East and North Africa (IFPI)	5
Mexico (Billboard)	2
Morocco (Hit Radio)	2
Netherlands (Single Top 100)	12
New Zealand Hot Singles (RMNZ)	29
Nicaragua Airplay (Monitor Latino)	3
North Africa (IFPI)	3
North Africa Airplay (Radiomonitor)	2
Norway (VG-lista)	40
Panama International (PRODUCE)	3
Paraguay Airplay (Monitor Latino)	9
Peru (Billboard)	1
Peru Airplay (Monitor Latino)	3
Poland (Polish Airplay Top 100)	83
Poland (Polish Streaming Top 100)	62
Portugal (AFP)	2
Puerto Rico Airplay (Monitor Latino)	17
Romania (Billboard)	16
Saudi Arabia (IFPI)	12
Slovakia Singles Digital (ČNS IFPI)	9
Spain (Promusicae)	3
Sweden (Sverigetopplistan)	27
Switzerland (Schweizer Hitparade)	1
Turkey International Airplay (Radiomonitor Türkiye)	1
United Arab Emirates (IFPI)	5
UK Singles (Official Charts)	58
UK Indie (Official Charts)	10
Uruguay Airplay (Monitor Latino)	12
US Billboard Hot 100	27
US Hot Latin Songs (Billboard)	1
US Latin Airplay (Billboard)	5

=== Monthly charts ===
Monthly chart performance for "Gata Only"
Chart (2024)	Peak position
Czech Republic (Singles Digitál – Top 100)	8
Lithuania Airplay (TopHit)	68
Panama (PRODUCE)	5
Slovakia (Singles Digitál – Top 100)	8
Uruguay (CUD)	1

=== Year-end charts ===
2024 year-end chart performance for "Gata Only"
Chart (2024)	Position
Austria (Ö3 Austria Top 40)	25
Belgium (Ultratop 50 Flanders)	83
Belgium (Ultratop 50 Wallonia)	13
Canada (Canadian Hot 100)	68
Central America (Monitor Latino)	48
Chile (Monitor Latino)	15
Colombia (Monitor Latino)	24
Costa Rica (Monitor Latino)	27
El Salvador (Monitor Latino)	41
France (SNEP)	8
Germany (GfK)	70
Global 200 (Billboard)	9
Guatemala (Monitor Latino)	72
Honduras (Monitor Latino)	65
Hungary (Single Top 40)	81
Italy (FIMI)	12
Latin America (Monitor Latino)	28
Netherlands (Single Top 100)	36
Nicaragua (Monitor Latino)	28
Peru (Monitor Latino)	6
Portugal (AFP)	13
Puerto Rico (Monitor Latino)	76
Spain (PROMUSICAE)	7
Switzerland (Schweizer Hitparade)	3
Uruguay (Monitor Latino)	52
US Billboard Hot 100	52
US Hot Latin Songs (Billboard)	1
US Latin Airplay (Billboard)	49
US Latin Rhythm Airplay (Billboard)	21

2025 year-end chart performance for "Gata Only"
Chart (2025)	Position
Belgium (Ultratop 50 Flanders)	200
Belgium (Ultratop 50 Wallonia)	129
France (SNEP)	109
Global 200 (Billboard)	37
India International (IMI)	17

== Certifications ==
Certifications and sales for "Gata Only"
Region	Certification	Certified units/sales
Belgium (BRMA)	Platinum	40,000^{‡}
Denmark (IFPI Danmark)	Gold	45,000^{‡}
France (SNEP)	Diamond	333,333^{‡}
Italy (FIMI)	3× Platinum	300,000^{‡}
Spain (Promusicae)	5× Platinum	500,000^{‡}
United Kingdom (BPI)	Gold	400,000^{‡}
United States (RIAA)	4× Platinum	4,000,000^{‡}
Streaming
Greece (IFPI Greece)	3× Platinum	6,000,000^{†}
Worldwide (Luminate)	—	982,000,000
^{‡} Sales+streaming figures based on certification alone.^{†} Streaming-only figures based on certification alone.

== Other versions ==
=== Remix version ===
"Gata Only" (remix)

Single by FloyyMenor, Ozuna and Anitta
- Language: Spanish
- Released: 7 June 2024
- Genre: Reggaeton
- Length: 3:49
- Label: UnitedMasters
- Songwriters: Alan Felipe Galleguillos; Hector Duran; Juan Carlos Ozuna Rosado; Larissa de Macedo Machado; Mario Cáceres; Sebastian Cáceres
- Producer: Atmyamil

Music video
- "Gata Only" (remix) on YouTube

Following the worldwide success of "Gata Only", FloyyMenor would enlist Ozuna and Anitta to be part of its remix version, stating that their contributions make it "all bigger and more special", while Ozuna himself admired both FloyyMenor's and Cris MJ's impact in the Latin urban genre. Cris MJ would be absent from the remix, though it was confirmed by Jorge Álvarez, who is his father, but was also speculated that a music video with all four artists would be released soon.

The remix was released on 7 June 2024, through UnitedMasters. It also received mixed reception from users, stating that the song did not need a remix version or that "without [Álvarez], it is not 'Gata Only'". Further, it did not receive similar commercial success as its original version, appearing on national charts in only four countries; it peaked at number 51 in Austria, number 46 in Italy, number 17 in Peru, and number 64 in Spain. The remix received a gold certification in the latter country, denoting sales of 50,000 units based on sales and streaming figures.

==== Charts ====
Weekly chart performance for "Gata Only" (remix)
Chart (2024–2025)	Peak position
Austria (Ö3 Austria Top 40)	51
Italy (FIMI)	46
Peru Airplay (Monitor Latino)	17
Spain (Promusicae)	64

2024 year-end chart performance for "Gata Only" (remix)
Chart (2024)	Position
Portugal (AFP)	38

2025 year-end chart performance for "Gata Only" (remix)
Chart (2025)	Position
Switzerland (Schweizer Hitparade)	16

==== Certifications ====
Certifications and sales for "Gata Only"
Region	Certification	Certified units/sales
Spain (Promusicae) Remix version	Gold	50,000^{‡}
^{‡} Sales+streaming figures based on certification alone.

=== Cover versions and media usage ===
Chilean band La Caravana Mágica, from Pichilemu, released a cover version of "Gata Only" in May 2024, which infuses multiple musical genres such as cumbia, flamenco, reggae and Hawaiian. In the same month, Brazilian rapper MC Nova Era uploaded a cover of the song in Portuguese, which has since received over 339 thousand views on YouTube. Their version peaked at number 57 in Paraguay's monthly chart for July. In August 2024, a video of American rapper Travis Scott dancing to the song went viral on social platform TikTok.

== Release history ==
Release dates and formats for "Gata Only"
Region	Date	Format(s)	Version	Label(s)	Ref.
Various	21 December 2023	Digital download; streaming	Solo	UnitedMasters	
Various	2 February 2024	Digital download; streaming	Duet	UnitedMasters	
Various	7 June 2024	Digital download; streaming	Remix	UnitedMasters	

== See also ==
- 2024 in Latin music
- List of Latin songs on the Billboard Hot 100
- List of Billboard Hot Latin Songs and Latin Airplay number ones of 2024
- List of Billboard Hot Latin Songs chart achievements and milestones
- List of best-selling Latin singles in the United States
- List of number-one hits of 2024 (France)
- List of best-selling singles in Spain
- List of number-one hits of 2024 (Switzerland)
- List of Billboard Argentina Hot 100 top-ten singles in 2024
- List of Billboard Global 200 top-ten singles in 2024
- List of number-one singles of 2024 (Spain)
- List of best-selling Latin singles
