= La Intención =

Single by Christian Nodal and Peso Pluma

from the album Pa'l Cora Ep. 01
- Language: Spanish
- English title: "The Intention"
- Released: 25 January 2024
- Genre: Regional Mexican; Sinaloan sierreño; ranchera
- Length: 4:09
- Label: Sony Music Mexico
- Songwriters: Brian Sandoval; Christian Nodal; Isaías Sandoval
- Producers: Christian Nodal; Lucas Otero; Peso Pluma; Iván Leal Reyes; Ernesto Fernandez

Christian Nodal singles chronology
| "Fuego de Noche, Nieve de Día" (2023) | "La Intención" (2024) | "Ya Pedo Quién Sabe" (2024) |

Peso Pluma singles chronology
| "Rompe la Dompe" (2023) | "La Intención" (2024) | "Igual que un Ángel" (2024) |

Music video
- "La Intención" on YouTube

"La Intención" (transl. "The Intention") is a song by Mexican singers Christian Nodal and Peso Pluma, released on 25 January 2024, through Sony Music Mexico, as the lead single from the former's album Pa'l Cora Ep. 01 (2024). It is the first collaboration between both artists.

== Background ==
A photo of both singers in a studio was posted on Instagram, with fans speculating that it would be a possible collaboration between both artists.

The former told Sony Music about Peso Pluma and about working with him:

Starting this new year fulfilling the pending dream of two kids who started in this for the love of music, seeking to express in lyrics and melodies what we wanted to say to the world, is all I can ask for. Peso Pluma belongs to a generation that wants the world to know its music, which carries the aroma of ranch, grass and gallop. We are very happy with the result of how "La Intención" turned out for us, it is made with the intention that you love it as much as we love you.

== Music video ==
A music video was released on the same day of the song's release, which features both artists. It was filmed in Los Angeles and was directed by Fernando Lugo.

== Charts ==
Chart performance for "La Intención"
| Chart (2024) | Peak position |
|---|---|
| Colombia (National-Report) | 1 |
| Global 200 (Billboard) | 96 |
| Mexico (Billboard) | 9 |
| US Billboard Hot 100 | 92 |
| US Hot Latin Songs (Billboard) | 13 |
| US Latin Airplay (Billboard) | 2 |
| US Regional Mexican Airplay (Billboard) | 1 |

== Certifications ==
Certifications for "La Intención"
| Region | Certification | Certified units/sales |
|---|---|---|
| Mexico (AMPROFON) | 4× Platinum | 560,000^{‡} |
| United States (RIAA) | 7× Platinum (Latin) | 420,000^{‡} |
^{‡} Sales+streaming figures based on certification alone.

== Release history ==
Release dates and formats for "La Intención"
| Region | Date | Format(s) | Label(s) | Ref. |
|---|---|---|---|---|
| Various | 26 January 2024 | Digital download; streaming | Sony Mexico | |
