= Qlona =

Single by Karol G and Peso Pluma

from the album Mañana Será Bonito (Bichota Season)
- Language: Spanish
- English title: "Big Ass"
- Released: September 6, 2023
- Genre: Reggaeton
- Length: 2:53
- Label: Bichota; Interscope
- Songwriters: Carolina Giraldo Navarro; Hassan Emilio Kabande Laija; Daniel Echavarria Oviedo; Daniel Esteban Gutiérrez
- Producer: Ovy on the Drums

Karol G singles chronology
"Mi Ex Tenía Razón" (2023)	"Qlona" (2023)	"Labios Mordidos" (2023)

Peso Pluma singles chronology
""Ex-Special"" (2023)	"Qlona" (2023)	"Bipolar" (2023)

Visualizer
- "Qlona" on YouTube

"Qlona" (read as "Culona"; transl. "Big Ass") is a song by Colombian singer-songwriter Karol G and Mexican singer-songwriter and rapper Peso Pluma. Written alongside Daniel Gutierrez and Ovy on the Drums, the song was released on September 6, 2023, through Bichota Records and Interscope, as the third and final single from her second mixtape project, Mañana Será Bonito (Bichota Season).

== Background ==
On July 31, 2023, Karol G announced the release date of her new mixtape Mañana Será Bonito (Bichota Season). On August 7, 2023, Giraldo revealed the track list, where "Qlona" was featured. The song was released on August 11, 2023, alongside the mixtape's release. It was later released as a single on September 3, 2023.

== Commercial performance ==
On the US Billboard Hot 100 chart dated August 26, 2023, the song debuted at number 29. The following week, on the chart dated September 2, 2023, the song climbed one spot to a new peak of number 28.

On the US Billboard Hot Latin Songs chart dated August 26, 2023, the song debuted at number 2, behind her own "Mi Ex Tenía Razón". On the chart dated September 2, 2023, during its second week, the song reached the top spot of the chart.

On the Billboard Global 200 the song debuted at number 29 on the chart dated August 26, 2023. During its second week, the song reached a new peak of number 12.

== Awards and nominations ==
Awards and nominations for "Qlona"
Year	Ceremony	Category	Result	Ref.
2024	Billboard Latin Music Awards	Global 200 Latin Song of the Year	Nominated	
2024	Billboard Latin Music Awards	Latin Song of the Year	Won	
2024	Billboard Latin Music Awards	Hot Latin Song of the Year, Vocal Event	Won	
2024	Billboard Latin Music Awards	Latin Airplay Song of the Year	Nominated	
2024	Billboard Latin Music Awards	Sales Song of the Year	Nominated	
2024	Billboard Latin Music Awards	Streaming Song of the Year	Won	
2024	Los 40 Music Awards	Best Urban Collaboration	Nominated	
2024	Latin Grammy Awards	Best Reggaeton Performance	Nominated	
2024	Latin Grammy Awards	Best Urban Song	Nominated	
2024	MTV MIAW Awards	Supreme Bellakeo	Nominated	
2024	Premios Juventud	Best Urban Track	Won	
2024	Premios Nuestra Tierra	Best Urban Song	Nominated	
2024	Spotify Plaques	One Billion Streams Award	Won	
2024	Billboard Music Awards	Top Latin Song	Nominated	
2025	BMI Latin Awards	Award Winning Song	Won	

== Audio visualizer ==
An audio visualizer for "Qlona" was released on Karol G's YouTube channel on August 11, 2023.

== Live performances ==
From August 10, 2023, to July 23, 2024, Karol G embarked on the arena-stadium Mañana Será Bonito Tour, where "Qlona" was present throughout the set list. On November 19, 2023, Karol G performed a medley of songs, including "Qlona" at the Billboard Music Awards. On December 1, 2023, during the tour, Giraldo brought Peso Pluma for the debut performance of the song sang with both artists.

== Charts ==
=== Weekly charts ===
Weekly chart performance for "Qlona"
Chart (2023–2024)	Peak position
Argentina Hot 100 (Billboard)	17
Argentina (Monitor Latino)	15
Bolivia (Monitor Latino)	6
Central America (Monitor Latino)	11
Chile (Billboard)	2
Colombia (Billboard)	1
Colombia (Monitor Latino)	5
Costa Rica (FONOTICA)	18
Costa Rica (Monitor Latino)	15
Dominican Republic (Monitor Latino)	6
Ecuador (Billboard)	1
Ecuador (Monitor Latino)	10
El Salvador (Monitor Latino)	2
Global 200 (Billboard)	7
Guatemala (Monitor Latino)	3
Honduras (Monitor Latino)	12
Latin America (Monitor Latino)	3
Mexico (Billboard)	3
Nicaragua (Monitor Latino)	4
Paraguay (Monitor Latino)	15
Peru (Monitor Latino)	2
Puerto Rico (Monitor Latino)	3
Spain (Promusicae)	7
Uruguay (Monitor Latino)	11
US Billboard Hot 100	28
US Hot Latin Songs (Billboard)	1
US Latin Airplay (Billboard)	1
US Latin Rhythm Airplay (Billboard)	1
US Rhythmic Airplay (Billboard)	39

=== Year-end charts ===
2023 year-end chart performance for "Qlona"
Chart (2023)	Position
Global 200 (Billboard)	175
US Hot Latin Songs (Billboard)	34

2024 year-end chart performance for "Qlona"
Chart (2024)	Position
Global 200 (Billboard)	34
US Hot Latin Songs (Billboard)	5
US Latin Airplay (Billboard)	1
US Latin Rhythm Airplay (Billboard)	4

== Certifications ==
Certifications for "Qlona"
Region	Certification	Certified units/sales
Brazil (Pro-Música Brasil)	2× Platinum	80,000^{‡}
Canada (Music Canada)	Platinum	80,000^{‡}
France (SNEP)	Gold	100,000^{‡}
Italy (FIMI)	Gold	50,000^{‡}
Spain (Promusicae)	5× Platinum	300,000^{‡}
United States (RIAA)	7× Platinum (Latin)	420,000^{‡}
^{‡} Sales+streaming figures based on certification alone.

== See also ==
- List of Billboard Global 200 top 10 singles of 2023
- List of Billboard Hot Latin Songs and Latin Airplay number ones of 2023
- List of Billboard Hot Latin Songs and Latin Airplay number ones of 2024
- List of best-selling singles in Spain
