= First Love (Oscar Ortiz and Edgardo Nuñez song) =

2023 single by Oscar Ortiz and Edgardo Nuñez

Single by Oscar Ortiz and Edgardo Nuñez
- Released: December 7, 2023
- Genre: Regional Mexican
- Length: 2:49
- Label: Badsin
- Songwriter: Oscar Ortiz
- Producer: Edgar Omar Rojas

Oscar Ortiz singles chronology
"Alvrgzo" (2023)	"First Love" (2023)	"Delante de Mi (En Vivo)" (2024)

Edgardo Nuñez singles chronology
"De Fresa y Coco" (2023)	"First Love" (2023)	"Ya No Llores Bb" (2023)

Music video
- "First Love" on YouTube

"First Love" is a single by Mexican singers Oscar Ortiz and Edgardo Nuñez, released on December 7, 2023. It is Ortiz's first and only song to enter the Billboard Hot 100, peaking at number 91.

== Commercial performance ==
"First Love" debuted at number 46 on the Hot Latin Songs with two million streams during the second week of January 2024, becoming Oscar Ortiz's first entry on a Billboard chart. The song's popularity was significantly contributed by its use on the video-sharing app TikTok, where it had soundtracked over 170,000 clips by the end of the month. The song debuted at No. 94 on the Billboard Hot 100 in the week ending on February 3, with 5.8 million official U.S. streams (up 35%) in the January 19–25 tracking week. During that week, it also jumped 148-72 on the Billboard Global 200 and 140-61 on the Billboard Global Excl. U.S. chart, up 40% to 23.4 million streams worldwide. The song topped the Regional Mexican Airplay on the April 27–dated chart, and was the first Billboard number one for both artists.

== Charts ==
Chart performance for "First Love"
Chart (2024)	Peak position
Global 200 (Billboard)	50
US Billboard Hot 100	91
US Hot Latin Songs (Billboard)	11
US Regional Mexican Airplay (Billboard)	1
