= El Comienzo (EP) =

EP by FloyyMenor
- Released: August 9, 2024
- Length: 16:56
- Language: Spanish
- Label: UnitedMasters
- Producers: FloyyMenor; Valdi; Lewis Somes; Big Cvyu; ATM Yamil; Dcafu; Nacho G Flow; El Murciélago

FloyyMenor chronology
El Comienzo (2024)	MJ (2024)

Singles from El Comienzo
- 1. "Gata Only" Released: February 2, 2024; 2. "Me Gusta" Released: March 1, 2024; 3. "A Poka Luz" Released: April 12, 2024; 4. "Apaga el Cel" Released: May 15, 2024; 5. "Peligrosa" Released: July 12, 2024

El Comienzo (English: The Beginning) is the debut extended play by Chilean singer FloyyMenor. It was released on August 9, 2024, through UnitedMasters. It features guest appearances from Cris MJ, Lucky Brown and Lewis Somes.

== Singles ==
The lead single "Gata Only" was released on February 2, 2024, in collaboration with his compatriot Cris MJ. "Me Gusta" is the second single published on March 1, 2024, in collaboration with Chilean artist Lucky Brown. On April 12, 2024, "A Poka Luz" came out as the third single from the extended play. On May 15, 2024, FloyyMenor released "Apaga el Cel" as the fourth single from "El Comienzo" with the participation of Chilean producer Lewis Somes. "Peligrosa" was released as the fifth single from the extended play on July 12, 2024.

== Commercial performance ==
El Comienzo debuted at number 14 on the Top Latin Albums chart. The extended play also debuted at number nine of the Spanish Albums Chart and appeared at the top 20 in Italy.

== Track listing ==
El Comienzo track listing
No.	Title	Writer(s)	Producer(s)	Length
1.	"Gata Only" (featuring Cris MJ)	Alan Felipe Galleguillos; Christopher Andrés Álvarez García	Big Cvyu	3:42
2.	"Me Gusta" (featuring Lucky Brown)	Felipe; Lucky Brown	Valdi	2:15
3.	"A Poka Luz"	Felipe	FloyyMenor	2:24
4.	"Apaga el Cel" (featuring Lewis Somes)	Felipe	Lewis Somes	3:04
5.	"Peligrosa"	Felipe	FloyyMenor	2:14
6.	"Lorea Mami"	Felipe	FloyyMenor	1:56
7.	"Tu Ta Rica" (featuring Lewis Somes)	Felipe	Lewis Somes	2:01
Total length:				16:50

== Charts ==
Chart performance for El Comienzo
Chart (2024–2025)	Peak position
Italian Albums (FIMI)	19
Lithuanian Albums (AGATA)	46
Portuguese Albums (AFP)	81
Spanish Albums (Promusicae)	9
Swiss Albums (Schweizer Hitparade)	91
US Heatseekers Albums (Billboard)	2
US Independent Albums (Billboard)	40
US Latin Rhythm Albums (Billboard)	6
US Top Latin Albums (Billboard)	14

== Certifications ==
Certifications for El Comienzo
Region	Certification	Certified units/sales
Italy (FIMI)	Platinum	50,000^{‡}
United States (RIAA)	5× Platinum (Latin)	300,000^{‡}
^{‡} Sales+streaming figures based on certification alone.
