= Rompe la Dompe =

Single by Peso Pluma, Junior H and Óscar Maydon

from the album Éxodo
- Language: Spanish
- Released: 28 December 2023
- Genre: Regional Mexican; corrido tumbado
- Length: 2:45
- Label: Double P; Rancho Humilde
- Songwriter: Alexis Fierro
- Producers: Alexis Fierro; Peso Pluma; Junior H; Óscar Maydon

Peso Pluma singles chronology
| "Bellakeo" (2023) | "Rompe la Dompe" (2023) | "La Intención" (2024) |

Junior H singles chronology
| "Mafiosa" (2023) | "Rompe la Dompe" (2023) | "A Tu Manera" (2024) |

Óscar Maydon singles chronology
| "Kim K" (2023) | "Rompe la Dompe" (2023) |

Music video
- "Rompe la Dompe" on YouTube

"Rompe la Dompe" is a song by Mexican singers Peso Pluma, Junior H, and Óscar Maydon, which was released on 28 December 2023, through Double P Records and Rancho Humilde, as the second single from the former's fourth studio album Éxodo (2024). The song was written and produced by Alexis Fierro, and was co-produced by the three singers.

== Background ==
Originally teased by Óscar Maydon, according to Agushto Papá, he said that he would release "Rompe la Dompe" if his album Distorsión (2023) reached 100 million streams. Peso Pluma had also been teasing the song on social platforms, referring it as the "último corrido del año" (final corrido of the year).

== Music and lyrics ==
"Rompe la Dompe" is a corrido tumbado. The song's title is a shortened way of saying "Rompe la Dom Pérignon", which refers to opening a bottle of the Champagne; it is used throughout the song. The lyrics also talk about having a party, trying to forget about an ex-lover.

== Charts ==
Weekly chart performance for "Rompe la Dompe"
| Chart (2024) | Peak position |
|---|---|
| Global 200 (Billboard) | 51 |
| Mexico (Billboard) | 4 |
| US Billboard Hot 100 | 81 |
| US Hot Latin Songs (Billboard) | 12 |

== Release history ==
Release dates and formats for "Rompe la Dompe"
| Region | Date | Format(s) | Label(s) | Ref. |
|---|---|---|---|---|
| Various | 28 December 2023 | Digital download; streaming | Double P; Rancho Humilde | |
