= Apaga el Cel =

2024 song by FloyyMenor

Single by FloyyMenor and Lewis Somes

from the EP El Comienzo
- Language: Spanish
- English title: Turn Off the Phone
- Released: May 17, 2024
- Genre: Reggaeton
- Length: 3:04
- Label: UnitedMasters
- Songwriter: Alan Felipe Cepeda
- Producer: Lewis Somes

FloyyMenor singles chronology
"Me Gusta" (2024)	"Apaga el Cel" (2024)	"Peligrosa" (2024)

Music video
- "Apaga el Cel" on YouTube

"Apaga el Cel" (transl. "Turn Off the Phone") is a song by Chilean rapper FloyyMenor and Chilean producer Lewis Somes. It was released by UnitedMasters on May 17, 2024, as the fourth single from FloyyMenor's debut extended play, El Comienzo (2024). In both artists' homecountry Chile, the song finished at number 2 on the Billboard chart dated June 8, 2024.

== Background ==
On August 9, 2024, FloyyMenor released his debut extended play, El Comienzo, and "Apaga el Cel" was included as the fourth track.

== Commercial performance ==
"Apaga el Cel" debuted and peaked at number 44 on the Hot Latin Songs chart dated July 27, 2024. The song also debuted at number 166 on the Billboard Global 200 on the issue dated July 27, 2024. On the song chart in Spain, it debuted at the 36th position, before reaching the 16th position in its third week on the chart and was also certified platinum in the country. It also peaked in top 20 in Argentina and Peru.

== Music video ==
The music video for "Apaga el Cel" was released on May 17, 2024, in FloyyMenor's Youtube channel and was directed by Ignacio Cruz.

== Charts ==
Chart performance for "Apaga el Cel"
Chart (2024)	Peak position
Argentina (Argentina Hot 100)	19
Chile (Billboard)	2
Global 200 (Billboard)	166
Peru (Billboard)	20
Spain (PROMUSICAE)	16
US Hot Latin Songs (Billboard)	44

== Certifications ==
Certifications and sales for "Apaga el Cel"
Region	Certification	Certified units/sales
Spain (Promusicae)	Platinum	60,000^{‡}
United States (RIAA)	Gold	500,000^{‡}
^{‡} Sales+streaming figures based on certification alone.
