= Igual que un Ángel =

2024 single by Kali Uchis and Peso Pluma

Single by Kali Uchis and Peso Pluma

from the album Orquídeas
- Language: English-Spanish
- Released: February 1, 2024
- Recorded: 2022
- Genre: Synth-pop; dance-pop; disco
- Length: 4:20; 2:58 (radio edit)
- Label: Geffen; Universal
- Songwriters: Karly-Marina Loaiza; Carter Lang; Dylan Wiggins; Manuel Lorente
- Producers: Carter Lang; Dylan Wiggins; Austen Jux-Chandler; Jean Rodríguez

Kali Uchis singles chronology
"Labios Mordidos" (2023)	"Igual que un Ángel" (2024)	"Never Be Yours" (2024)

Peso Pluma singles chronology
"La Intención" (2024)	"Igual que un Ángel" (2024)	"A Tu Manera" (2024)

Music video
- "Igual que un Ángel" on YouTube

"Igual que un Ángel" (Spanish: [iˈɣwal ke un ˈaŋxel], transl. Just like an Angel) is a song by the American singer Kali Uchis and the Mexican musician Peso Pluma, from Uchis' fourth studio album, Orquídeas (2024). Originally released as a track from the album through Geffen Records, it was sent to Italian radio airplay through Universal Music Group on February 1, 2024, as the album's fourth single. The song was written by Uchis with Manuel Lorente, and its producers Carter Lang and Dylan Wiggins, with Austen-Jux Chandler and Jean Rodríguez receiving production credits.

== Background ==
Kali Uchis sent "Igual que un Ángel" and another song from Orquídeas, "Te Mata" to Peso Pluma, but did not expect him to record his verse on the songs. Uchis found out that Pluma loved "Igual que un Ángel", and they later worked on the song.

== Accolades ==
Awards and nominations for Igual que un Ángel
Organization	Year	Category	Result	Ref.
Latin Grammy Awards	2024	Best Pop Song	Nominated	
Latin Grammy Awards	2024	Record of the Year	Nominated	

== Commercial performance ==
Following the album's release, "Igual que un Ángel" debuted atop the Billboard US Hot Latin Songs chart, having received a total of 13.4 million streams in the United States, and was the second song from Orquídeas overall, after "Labios Mordidos", to enter the US Billboard Hot 100, debuting at number 23, while Labios Mordidos entered the chart at number 97. The song peaked at number 9 on the Billboard Global 200, and peaked at number 10 on the chart's version excluding the U.S.

== Music video ==
A music video directed by Jason Lester was released on January 17, 2024. It depicts a visibly pregnant Kali Uchis performing the song with a full band in a retro lit modernist house while Peso Pluma performs in a neon-soaked stairwell.

== Charts ==
=== Weekly charts ===
Weekly chart performance for "Igual que un Ángel"
Chart (2024)	Peak position
Bolivia (Billboard)	20
Ecuador (Billboard)	15
Global 200 (Billboard)	9
Mexico (Billboard)	3
New Zealand Hot Singles (RMNZ)	21
Peru (Billboard)	12
US Billboard Hot 100	22
US Hot Latin Songs (Billboard)	1
US Latin Airplay (Billboard)	1
US Latin Pop Airplay (Billboard)	1
US Rhythmic Airplay (Billboard)	35

=== Year-end charts ===
Year-end chart performance for "Igual que un Ángel"
Chart (2024)	Position
US Hot Latin Songs (Billboard)	13

== Certifications ==
Certifications for "Igual que un Ángel"
Region	Certification	Certified units/sales
Brazil (Pro-Música Brasil)	Platinum	40,000^{‡}
Mexico (AMPROFON)	Diamond+2× Platinum+Gold	1,050,000^{‡}
United States (RIAA)	Platinum	1,000,000^{‡}
Streaming
Central America (CFC)	Platinum	7,000,000^{†}
^{‡} Sales+streaming figures based on certification alone.^{†} Streaming-only figures based on certification alone.
