= FloyyMenor =

Chilean singer-songwriter (born 2005)

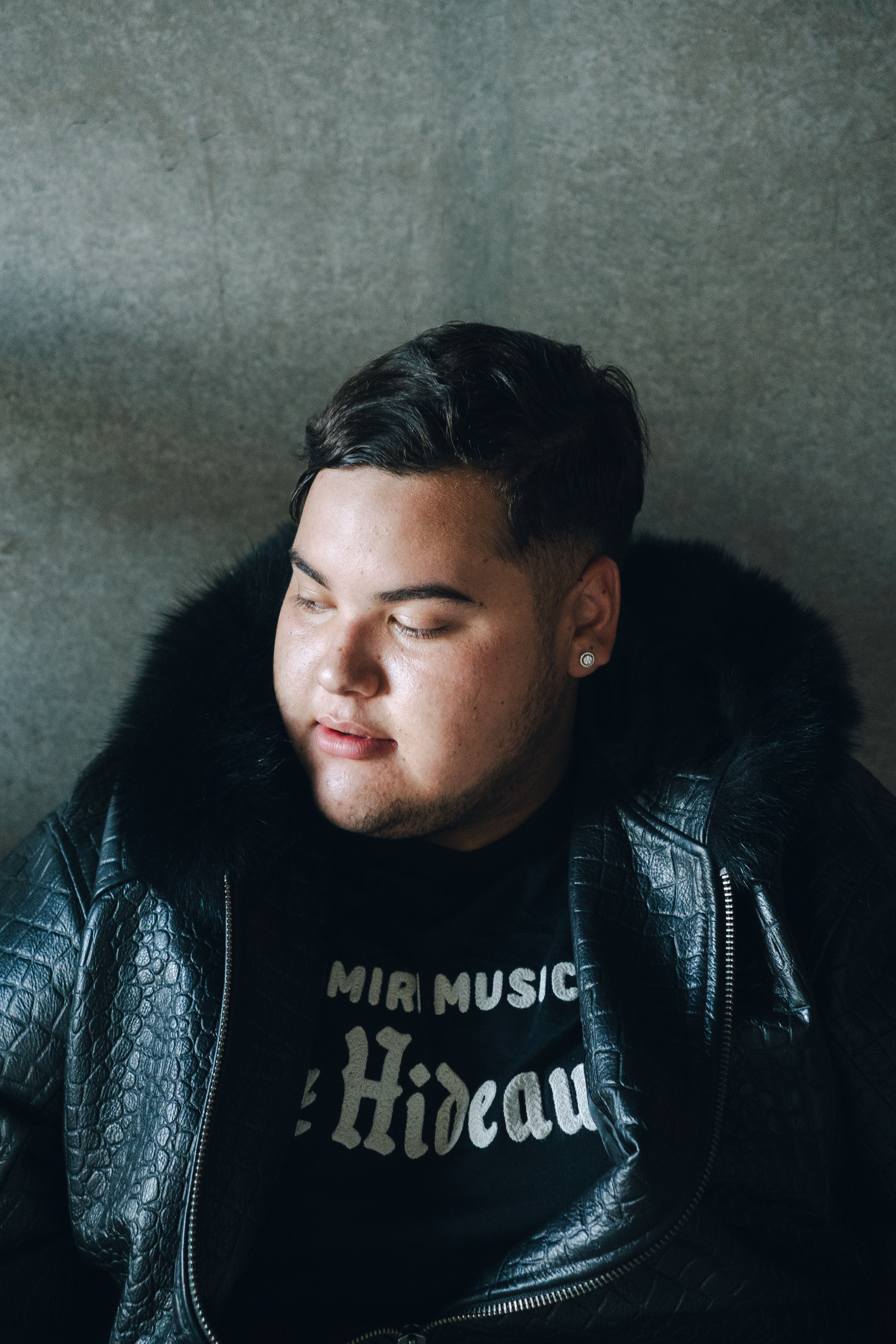
- FloyyMenor in March 2025

Background information
- Born: Alan Felipe Galleguillos; 11 August 2005 (age 21); La Serena, Chile
- Genre: Reggaeton
- Occupations: Singer; songwriter
- Years active: 2022–present
- Label: UnitedMasters
- Website: ytsqs.com

Alan Felipe Galleguillos, known professionally as FloyyMenor, is a Chilean singer and songwriter. After self-releasing singles since 2022, he eventually gained international prominence with his hit single "Gata Only" with Cris MJ, which he released through UnitedMasters.

== Life and career ==
Galleguillos was born in La Serena and raised in the town of Vicuña in Chile. He began uploading his songs onto YouTube in 2022, using cars and Fairly OddParents-inspired characters as his cover art for his singles. One of his friends showed one of Galleguillos' songs, "Pa la Europa", to producer Lewis Somes, who works for Chilean singer Pailita, and acknowledged it. The song later went viral and Galleguillos stated that he used little promotion for it.

After releasing more singles, he released "Gata Only" in December 2023. The song eventually attracted the attention of Chilean singer Cris MJ, who acknowledged it and wanted to be part of it. After the "official" duet version of the song was released in February 2024, it garnered international prominence, landing on multiple song charts, and eventually reaching the top five on the Billboard Global 200 and topping the US Hot Latin Songs chart.

== Discography ==
=== Albums ===
List of extended plays, with selected details
Title	Details	Peak chart positions					
Title	Details	ITA	LTU	POR	SPA	US Heat.	US Latin
YTSQS	Released: April 11, 2025; Label: Sonar; Format: Digital download, streaming	—	—	—	32	—	—
"—" denotes a recording that did not chart or was not released in that territory.

=== EPs ===
List of extended plays, with selected details
Title	Details	Peak chart positions						Certifications
Title	Details	ITA	LTU	POR	SPA	US Heat.	US Latin	Certifications
El Comienzo	Released: August 9, 2024; Label: UnitedMasters; Format: Digital download, streaming	19	72	93	9	2	14	FIMI: Platinum; RIAA: 5× Platinum (Latin)
MJ (with Cris MJ)	Released: September 13, 2024; Label: Sonar; Format: Digital download, streaming	—	—	—	—	—	—	
". " denotes a recording that did not chart or was not released in that territory.

=== Singles ===
List of singles, with selected chart positions, showing year released and album name
Title	Year	Peak chart positions										Certifications	Album
Title	Year	CHI	ARG	COL	ECU	MEX	PER	SPA	US	US Latin	WW	Certifications	Album
"Gata Only" (with Cris MJ or remix with Ozuna and Anitta)	2024	1	3	8	2	2	1	3	27	1	3	PROMUSICAE: 4× Platinum; RIAA: 4× Platinum; RIAA: 5× Diamond (Latin)	El Comienzo
"Me Gusta" (with Lucky Brown)	2024	—	—	—	—	—	—	—	—	—	—		El Comienzo
"A Poka Luz"	2024	—	—	—	—	—	—	—	—	—	—		El Comienzo
"Apaga el Cel" (with Lewis Somes)	2024	2	19	—	—	—	20	16	—	44	166	PROMUSICAE: Platinum; RIAA: Gold	El Comienzo
"Peligrosa"	2024	2	25	—	23	—	15	4	—	23	72	PROMUSICAE: Gold; RIAA: Gold; RIAA: 7× Platinum (Latin)	El Comienzo
"—" denotes a recording that did not chart or was not released in that territory.

=== Other charted songs ===
List of other charted songs, with selected chart positions, showing year released and album name
Title	Year	Peak chart positions						Certifications	Album
Title	Year	CHI	PER	SPA	US Bub.	US Latin	WW	Certifications	Album
"Tu Ta Rica" (with Lewis Somes)	2024	6	—	—	—	—	—		El Comienzo
"Después de la 1" (with Cris MJ and Louki)	2024	1	19	14	14	13	53	PROMUSICAE: Gold	MJ
"Déjame Pensar" (with Cris MJ)	2024	2	—	—	—	—	—		MJ
"—" denotes a recording that did not chart or was not released in that territory.

== Awards and nominations ==
Name of the award ceremony, year presented, nominated work of the award, award category, and the result of the nomination
Award ceremony	Year	Nominated work(s)	Category	Result	Ref.
MTV MIAW Awards	2024	"Gata Only" (with Cris MJ)	Viral Anthem	Nominated	
MTV MIAW Awards	2024	"Gata Only" (with Cris MJ)	Supreme Perreo	Nominated	
