= 2025 Billboard Latin Music Awards =

Latin music awards ceremony

32nd Billboard Latin Music Awards
- Date: October 23, 2025
- Location: James L. Knight Center; Miami, Florida
- Country: United States
- Hosted by: Goyo, Javier Poza & Elizabeth Gutiérrez

Highlights
- Most wins: Bad Bunny (11)
- Most nominations: Bad Bunny (27)

Television/radio coverage
- Network: Telemundo; Peacock
- Viewership: 1.7 million

The 32nd Billboard Latin Music Awards, presented by Billboard to honor the most popular albums, songs and performers in Latin music, was held at the James L. Knight Center in Miami on October 23, 2025. The ceremony was broadcast on Telemundo and available to stream on Peacock.

== Performers ==
List of performers at the 31st Billboard Latin Music Awards
Artist(s)	Song(s)
Olga Tañón	"El jolgorio"
Grupo Frontera	"Lalala"
Juan Duque	"Ojalá"
Nxnni	"Glow Up"
Musza	"Qué Inocente"
Abraham Mateo, Ángel Lopez & Arthur Hanlon	"A Puro Dolor"
La Arrolladora Banda El Limón de René Camacho	"Aquí hay para llevar"
Ozuna	"El Farsante" / "Dile Que Tú Me Quieres" / "Liberal" (con Beéle)
Netón Vega	"Qué motor"
Óscar Maydon & Netón Vega	"Amigos? No"
Daddy Yankee	"Sonríele"
Laura Pausini	"Mi historia entre tus dedos"
Carlos Vives, Emilia, Xavi & Wisin	"Somos Más"
Kapo	"DÓNDE" / "Ohnana" / "UWAIE"
Danny Ocean	"Corazón"
Peso Pluma	"Apaga la luz"
Elvis Crespo, Ebenezer Guerra, Toño Rosario & La Insuperable	"Luna llena" / "Borrón y cuenta nueva"

== Winners and nominees ==
The nominations were announced on September 10, 2025. Bad Bunny led with 27 nominations. He is followed by Fuerza Regida with 15, Rauw Alejandro with 14, Karol G—the most nominated female artist—and Tito Double P with 10 each, and Peso Pluma with 9.

Winners appear first and highlighted in bold.

Artist of the Year	New Artist of the Year
**Bad Bunny**; Fuerza Regida; Peso Pluma; Rauw Alejandro; Tito Double P	**Netón Vega**; Alemán; Clave Especial; FloyyMenor; Kapo
Tour of the Year	Crossover Artist of the Year
**Shakira**; Aventura; Chayanne; Luis Miguel; Rauw Alejandro	**Benny Blanco**; Ayra Starr; Bruno Mars; Rosé; Rvssian; Ty Dolla Sign
Global 200 Latin Artist of the Year	Global 200 Latin Song of the Year
**Bad Bunny**; Fuerza Regida; Karol G; Netón Vega; Tito Double P	**Karol G – "Si Antes Te Hubiera Conocido"**; Bad Bunny – "Baile Inolvidable"; Bad Bunny – "DTMF"; Bad Bunny – "Nuevayol"; Óscar Maydon & Fuerza Regida – "Tu Boda"
Hot Latin Song of the Year	Hot Latin Song of the Year, Vocal Event
**Bad Bunny – "DTMF"**; Bad Bunny – "Baile Inolvidable"; Bad Bunny – "Eoo"; Bad Bunny – "Nuevayol"; Óscar Maydon & Fuerza Regida – "Tu Boda"	**Óscar Maydon & Fuerza Regida – "Tu Boda"**; Fuerza Regida & Grupo Frontera – "Me Jalo"; Rauw Alejandro & Bad Bunny – "Qué Pasaría..."; Rauw Alejandro & Romeo Santos – "Khe?"; Tito Double P & Peso Pluma – "Dos Días"
Hot Latin Songs Artist of the Year, Male	Hot Latin Songs Artist of the Year, Female
**Bad Bunny**; Netón Vega; Peso Pluma; Rauw Alejandro; Tito Double P	**Karol G**; Selena Gomez; Shakira; Yailin La Más Viral; Young Miko
Duo/Group Hot Latin Songs Artist of the Year	Hot Latin Songs Label of the Year
**Fuerza Regida**; Clave Especial; Grupo Frontera; Julión Álvarez y Su Norteño Banda; The Marías	**Rimas**; Double P; Interscope Capitol Labels Group; Sony Music Latin; Warner Latina
Sales Song of the Year	Streaming Song of the Year
**Karol G – "Si Antes Te Hubiera Conocido"**; Bad Bunny – "Baile Inolvidable"; Bad Bunny – "DTMF"; Bad Bunny – "Nuevayol"; Xavi & Manuel Turizo – "En Privado"	**Bad Bunny – "DTMF"**; Bad Bunny – "Baile Inolvidable"; Bad Bunny – "Nuevayol"; Karol G – "Si Antes Te Hubiera Conocido"; Óscar Maydon & Fuerza Regida – "Tu Boda"
Airplay Song of the Year	Airplay Label of the Year
**Karol G – "Si Antes Te Hubiera Conocido"**; Fuerza Regida & Grupo Frontera – "Me Jalo"; Natti Natasha – "Desde Hoy"; Rauw Alejandro & Romeo Santos – "Khe?"; Shakira – "Soltera"	**Sony Music Latin**; Interscope Capitol Labels Group; Rimas; Universal Music Latin Entertainment; Warner Latina
Top Latin Album of the Year	Top Latin Albums Artist of the Year, Duo/Group
**Bad Bunny – Debí Tirar Más Fotos**; Netón Vega – Mi Vida Mi Muerte; Peso Pluma – Éxodo; Rauw Alejandro – Cosa Nuestra; Tito Double P – Incómodo	**Fuerza Regida**; Aventura; Clave Especial; Grupo Frontera; Julión Álvarez y Su Norteño Banda
Top Latin Albums Artist of the Year, Male	Top Latin Albums Artist of the Year, Female
**Bad Bunny**; Junior H; Peso Pluma; Rauw Alejandro; Tito Double P	**Karol G**; Becky G; Cazzu; Kali Uchis; Shakira
Top Latin Albums Label of the Year
**Sony Music Latin**; Double P; Interscope Capitol Labels Group; Rimas; Universal Music Latin Entertainment
Latin Pop Artist of the Year	Latin Pop Duo/Group of the Year
**Shakira**; Danny Ocean; Enrique Iglesias; Kali Uchis; Luis Fonsi	**Maná**; Ha*Ash; Jesse & Joy; Morat; Sin Bandera
Latin Pop Song of the Year	Latin Pop Album of the Year
**Shakira – "Soltera"**; Danny Ocean & Kapo – "Imagínate"; Maluma – "Cosas Pendientes"; Rauw Alejandro – "Carita Linda"; Selena Gomez, Benny Blanco & The Marias – "Ojos Tristes"	**Kapo – Por Si Alguien Nos Escucha**; Cazzu – Latinaje; Danny Ocean – Babylon Club; Latin Mafia – Todos Los Días Todo El Día; Quevedo – Buenas Noches
Latin Pop Airplay Label of the Year	Latin Pop Albums Label of the Year
**Sony Music Latin**; AP Global; Interscope Capitol Labels Group; Universal Music Latin Entertainment; Warner Latina	**Sony Music Latin**; Interscope Capitol Labels Group; Universal Music Enterprises; Universal Music Latin Entertainment; Warner Latina
Tropical Artist of the Year, Solo	Tropical Artist of the Year, Duo or Group
**Romeo Santos**; Elvis Crespo; Jerry Rivera; Marc Anthony; Prince Royce	**Aventura**; Chino & Nacho; Grupo Niche; La Sonora Dinamita; Monchy & Alexandra
Tropical Song of the Year	Tropical Album of the Year
**Karol G – "Si Antes Te Hubiera Conocido"**; Bad Bunny – "Baile Inolvidable"; Grupo Frontera & Romeo Santos – "Ángel"; Rauw Alejandro – "Tú Con Él"; Xavi & Manuel Turizo – "En Privado"	**Rubby Pérez – Rubby Pérez ¡Grandes Éxitos!**; Grupo Kual? Dinastía Pedraza – Los Reyes De La Cumbia Sonidera: En México; Los Hermanos Rosario – Grandes Éxitos; Natti Natasha – En Amargue; Prince Royce – Eterno
Tropical Songs Airplay Label of the Year	Tropical Albums Label of the Year
**Sony Music Latin**; Grupo Frontera; Interscope Capitol Labels Group; Rimas; Warner Latina	**Sony Music Latin**; Discos Fuentes; The Orchard; Universal Music Enterprises; Universal Music Latin Entertainment
Regional Mexican Artist of the Year, Solo	Regional Mexican Artist of the Year, Duo or Group
**Peso Pluma**; Iván Cornejo; Junior H; Netón Vega; Tito Double P	**Fuerza Regida**; Clave Especial; Grupo Frontera; Julión Álvarez y Su Norteño Banda; Los Tigres del Norte
Regional Mexican Song of the Year	Regional Mexican Album of the Year
**Óscar Maydon & Fuerza Regida – "Tu Boda"**; Fuerza Regida & Grupo Frontera – "Me Jalo"; Fuerza Regida – "Por Esos Ojos"; Peso Pluma & Netón Vega – "La Patrulla"; Tito Double P & Peso Pluma – "Dos Días"	**Tito Double P – Incómodo**; Fuerza Regida – 111xpantia; Iván Cornejo – Mirada; Netón Vega – Mi Vida Mi Muerte; Peso Pluma – Éxodo
Regional Mexican Airplay Label of the Year	Regional Mexican Albums Label of the Year
**Universal Music Latin Entertainment**; Afinarte; Azteca; Socios; Sony Music Latin	**Double P**; Interscope Capitol Labels Group; Sony Music Latin; Universal Music Latin Entertainment; Warner Latina
Latin Rhythm Artist of the Year, Solo	Latin Rhythm Artist of the Year, Duo or Group
**Bad Bunny**; Feid; Kapo; Karol G; Rauw Alejandro	**Baby Rasta & Gringo**; Alexis & Fido; J-King & Maximan; Jowell & Randy; Mambo Kingz
Latin Rhythm Song of the Year	Latin Rhythm Album of the Year
**Bad Bunny – "DTMF"**; Bad Bunny – "Eoo"; Bad Bunny – "Nuevayol"; Rauw Alejandro & Bad Bunny – "Qué Pasaría..."; Rauw Alejandro & Romeo Santos – "Khe?"	**Bad Bunny – Debí Tirar Más Fotos**; FloyyMenor – El Comienzo; Karol G – Tropicoqueta; Omar Courtz – Primera Musa; Rauw Alejandro – Cosa Nuestra
Latin Rhythm Airplay Label of the Year	Latin Rhythm Albums Label of the Year
**Sony Music Latin**; Interscope Capitol Labels Group; Rimas; Universal Music Latin Entertainment; Warner Latina	**Rimas**; Interscope Capitol Labels Group; Sony Music Latin; United Masters; Universal Music Latin Entertainment
Songwriter of the Year	Producer of the Year
**Netón Vega**; Armenta; Bad Bunny; Jorsshh; Roberto "La Paciencia"	**Ernesto "Neto" Fernández**; JOP; Mag; Roberto "La Paciencia"; Tito Double P
Publisher of the Year	Publishing Corporation of the Year
**Street Mob Publishing, BMI**; Downtown DMP Songs, BMI; Josa Publishing, BMI; Sony Latin Music Publishing, LLC, BMI; Warner-Tamerlane Publishing Corp., BMI	**Sony Music Publishing**; Downtown Music Publishing; Rimas Entertainment; Universal Music Publishing Group; Warner Chappell Music
Hall of Fame Award
Elvis Crespo
Icon Award
Laura Pausini
Vanguard Award
Peso Pluma
Latin Artist of the 21st Century Award
Bad Bunny
