= American Music Awards of 2026 =

2026 music awards ceremony

- Date: May 25, 2026
- Venue: MGM Grand Garden Arena; Paradise, Nevada
- Country: United States
- Hosted by: Queen Latifah

Highlights
- Most wins: Bruno Mars, BTS, Cardi B, Huntrix, Katseye, Sombr, and Sabrina Carpenter (3)
- Most nominations: Taylor Swift (8)
- Website: theamas.com

Television/radio coverage
- Network: CBS; Paramount+
- Produced by: Dick Clark Productions

The 52nd Annual American Music Awards were held on May 25, 2026, at the MGM Grand Garden Arena in Las Vegas. The ceremony was broadcast on CBS and streamed on Paramount+. Queen Latifah hosted the ceremony, 31 years after she first co-hosted the ceremony in 1995.

Nominations were announced on April 14, 2026; Taylor Swift led with eight. Twelve new categories were introduced: Breakout Tour, Breakthrough Album of the Year, Best Throwback Song, Best Vocal Performance, Song of the Summer, Breakthrough Pop Artist, Breakthrough Country Artist, Breakthrough Hip-Hop Artist, Breakthrough R&B Artist, Breakthrough Latin Artist, Breakthrough Rock/Alternative Artist, and Best Americana/Folk Artist.

Bruno Mars, BTS, Cardi B, Huntrix, Katseye, Sombr, and Sabrina Carpenter were the most awarded artists, winning three awards each. Karol G was honored with the International Artist Award of Excellence, Billy Idol with the Lifetime Achievement Award, and Darius Rucker with the Veterans Voice Award.

== Performances ==
Katseye was announced as the first performer on April 21, 2026. Twenty One Pilots and Teddy Swims were announced on May 4 and 5 respectively. Five additional performers were announced on May 7. Teyana Taylor was announced on May 12. Karol G, Billy Idol, and New Kids on the Block were all added to the lineup on May 13, 14, and 15 respectively. The Pussycat Dolls and Busta Rhymes were announced on May 18.

Performers at the American Music Awards of 2026
Performer(s)	Song(s)
BTS	"Hooligan" (pre recorded from Allegiant Stadium)
Hootie & the Blowfish	"Hold My Hand" "Only Wanna Be With You"
Sombr	"Homewrecker"
The Pussycat Dolls Busta Rhymes	"Buttons" "When I Grow Up" "Club Song" "Don't Cha"
Karol G	"Ivonny Bonita"
Riley Green	"Worst Way"
Twenty One Pilots	"Drag Path"
Katseye	"Pinky Up"
Keith Urban	"Summer Breeze"
New Kids on the Block	"You Got It (The Right Stuff)"
Teyana Taylor Missy Elliott	"All Of Your Heart" "Open Invite"
Teddy Swims	"Mr. Know It All"
Maluma	"Tu Recuerdo"
Billy Idol Steve Stevens	"White Wedding" "Eyes Without a Face" "Dancing With Myself"

== Presenters ==
Presenters were announced on May 21, 2026.

- Nikki Glaser – presented Best Rock/Alternative Song
- Paula Abdul and Jason Derulo – presented Song of the Year
- Linda Perry – introduced Sombr
- Alysa Liu – presented Best Rock/Alternative Artist
- Anthony Ramos and Gabriel Iglesias – presented Breakthrough R&B Artist
- John Legend – presented the International Artist Award and Best Latin Album to Karol G
- Hannah Berner and Lisa Rinna – presented Best Throwback Song
- Melanie Martinez – introduced Twenty One Pilots
- BTS – presented Best Female R&B Artist
- Russell Dickerson and Jake Wood – presented the Veterans Voice Award to Darius Rucker
- Megan Stalter and Paul W. Downs – presented Best Rock/Alternative Album
- Ejae and Rei Ami – introduced Katseye
- Riley Green – introduced Keith Urban
- GloRilla and Ludacris – presented Song of the Summer
- Matt Rife – presented Breakthrough Country Artist
- Hilary Duff – presented New Artist of the Year
- Mariah the Scientist – introduced Teddy Swims
- Busta Rhymes – presented Artist of the Year
- Leon Thomas – presented the Lifetime Achievement Award to Billy Idol

== Winners and nominees ==
The nominees were announced on April 14, 2026. Taylor Swift received the most nominations with eight, followed by Morgan Wallen, Olivia Dean, Sabrina Carpenter, and Sombr with seven nominations each, and Alex Warren and Lady Gaga with six nominations each. Bruno Mars, BTS, Cardi B, Huntrix, Katseye, Sombr, and Carpenter were the most awarded artists, with three wins each, while Bad Bunny, Ella Langley, Karol G, Shakira, Tyla, and Zara Larsson followed with two wins each.

Winners are listed first and highlighted in bold.

Artist of the Year	New Artist of the Year
**BTS**; Bad Bunny; Bruno Mars; Harry Styles; Justin Bieber; Kendrick Lamar; Lady Gaga; Morgan Wallen; Sabrina Carpenter; Taylor Swift	**Katseye**; Alex Warren; Ella Langley; Leon Thomas; Olivia Dean; Sombr
Album of the Year	Song of the Year
**Sabrina Carpenter** **– Man's Best Friend**; Cardi B – Am I the Drama?; Fuerza Regida – 111xpantia; Justin Bieber – Swag; Lady Gaga – Mayhem; Morgan Wallen – I'm the Problem; Olivia Dean – The Art of Loving; Playboi Carti – Music; Tate McRae – So Close to What; Taylor Swift – The Life of a Showgirl	**Huntrix: Ejae, Audrey Nuna and Rei Ami – "Golden"**; Alex Warren – "Ordinary"; Ella Langley – "Choosin' Texas"; Kehlani – "Folded"; Leon Thomas – "Mutt"; Morgan Wallen – "I'm the Problem"; Olivia Dean – "Man I Need"; Sabrina Carpenter – "Manchild"; Sombr – "Back to Friends"; Taylor Swift – "The Fate of Ophelia"
Collaboration of the Year	Social Song of the Year
**PinkPantheress and Zara Larsson – "Stateside"**; BigXthaPlug and Bailey Zimmerman – "All the Way"; David Guetta, Teddy Swims and Tones and I – "Gone Gone Gone"; Morgan Wallen and Tate McRae – "What I Want"; Shaboozey and Jelly Roll – "Amen"	**Tyla – "Chanel"**; Tinashe and Disco Lines – "No Broke Boys"; PinkPantheress – "Illegal"; Role Model – "Sally, When the Wine Runs Out"; Zara Larsson – "Lush Life"
Best Music Video	Best Soundtrack
**Katseye** **– "Gnarly"**; Rosalía, Björk and Yves Tumor – "Berghain"; Sabrina Carpenter – "Manchild"; Taylor Swift – "The Fate of Ophelia"; Tyla – "Chanel"	**KPop Demon Hunters**; F1 the Album; Hazbin Hotel: Season Two; Wicked: For Good; Charli XCX – Wuthering Heights
Tour of the Year	Breakout Tour
**Shakira – Las Mujeres Ya No Lloran World Tour**; Beyoncé – Cowboy Carter Tour; Kendrick Lamar and SZA – Grand National Tour; Lady Gaga – The Mayhem Ball; Oasis – Oasis Live '25 Tour	**Benson Boone – American Heart World Tour**; Kali Uchis – The Sincerely, Tour; The Marías – Submarine Tour; Megan Moroney – Am I Okay? Tour; Sleep Token – Even in Arcadia Tour
Breakthrough Album of the Year	Best Throwback Song
**Zara Larsson** **– Midnight Sun**; Olivia Dean – The Art of Loving; Sombr – I Barely Know Her	**Black Eyed Peas – "Rock That Body"**; 4 Non Blondes – "What's Up?"; Goo Goo Dolls – "Iris"
Best Vocal Performance	Song of the Summer
**Huntrix: Ejae, Audrey Nuna and Rei Ami – "Golden"**; Alex Warren – "Ordinary"; Lady Gaga – "Abracadabra"; Raye – "Where Is My Husband!"; Sienna Spiro – "Die on This Hill"	**BTS – "Swim"**; Alex Warren – "Fever Dream"; Bella Kay – "Iloveitiloveitiloveit"; Ella Langley – "Choosin' Texas"; Harry Styles – "American Girls"; Noah Kahan – "The Great Divide"; PinkPantheress and Zara Larsson – "Stateside"; Sombr – "Homewrecker"; Tame Impala and Jennie – "Dracula"; Taylor Swift – "Elizabeth Taylor"
Best Male Pop Artist	Best Female Pop Artist
**Justin Bieber**; Alex Warren; Benson Boone; Ed Sheeran; Harry Styles	**Sabrina Carpenter**; Lady Gaga; Olivia Dean; Tate McRae; Taylor Swift
Breakthrough Pop Artist	Best Pop Song
**Katseye**; Sienna Spiro; Zara Larsson	**Huntrix: Ejae, Audrey Nuna and Rei Ami – "Golden"**; Alex Warren – "Ordinary"; Olivia Dean – "Man I Need"; Sabrina Carpenter – "Manchild"; Taylor Swift – "The Fate of Ophelia"
Best Pop Album	Best Male Country Artist
**Sabrina Carpenter** **– Man's Best Friend**; Lady Gaga – Mayhem; Olivia Dean – The Art of Loving; Tate McRae – So Close to What; Taylor Swift – The Life of a Showgirl	**Morgan Wallen**; Jelly Roll; Luke Combs; Riley Green; Shaboozey
Best Female Country Artist	Best Country Duo or Group
**Ella Langley**; Kelsea Ballerini; Lainey Wilson; Megan Moroney; Miranda Lambert	**Zac Brown Band**; Brooks & Dunn; Old Dominion; Rascal Flatts; Treaty Oak Revival
Breakthrough Country Artist	Best Country Song
**Sam Barber**; Tucker Wetmore; Zach Top	**Ella Langley** **– "Choosin' Texas"**; BigXthaPlug and Bailey Zimmerman – "All the Way"; Morgan Wallen – "Just in Case"; Russell Dickerson – "Happen to Me"; Shaboozey – "Good News"
Best Country Album	Best Male Hip-Hop Artist
**Megan Moroney – Cloud 9**; BigXthaPlug – I Hope You're Happy; Morgan Wallen – I'm the Problem; Sam Barber – Restless Mind; Tucker Wetmore – What Not To	**Kendrick Lamar**; Don Toliver; Playboi Carti; Tyler, the Creator; YoungBoy Never Broke Again
Best Female Hip-Hop Artist	Breakthrough Hip-Hop Artist
**Cardi B**; Doechii; GloRilla; Sexyy Red; YK Niece	**Monaleo**; EsDeeKid; Pluto
Best Hip-Hop Song	Best Hip-Hop Album
**Cardi B – "ErrTime"**; Drake – "Nokia"; Gunna and Burna Boy – "WGFT"; Playboi Carti and The Weeknd – "Rather Lie"; YK Niece, Metro Boomin, Quavo and Breskii – "Take Me Thru Dere"	**Cardi B – Am I the Drama?**; Don Toliver – Octane; Gunna – The Last Wun; Playboi Carti – Music; YoungBoy Never Broke Again – MASA
Best Male R&B Artist	Best Female R&B Artist
**Bruno Mars**; Chris Brown; Daniel Caesar; PartyNextDoor; The Weeknd	**SZA**; Kehlani; Summer Walker; Teyana Taylor; Tyla
Breakthrough R&B Artist	Best R&B Song
**Leon Thomas**; Mariah the Scientist; Ravyn Lenae	**Bruno Mars – "I Just Might"**; Chris Brown featuring Bryson Tiller – "It Depends"; Kehlani – "Folded"; Leon Thomas – "Mutt"; Mariah the Scientist – "Burning Blue"
Best R&B Album	Best Male Latin Artist
**Bruno Mars – The Romantic**; Justin Bieber – Swag; Leon Thomas – Mutt; Mariah the Scientist – Hearts Sold Separately; Summer Walker – Finally Over It	**Bad Bunny**; Junior H; Peso Pluma; Rauw Alejandro; Tito Double P
Best Female Latin Artist	Best Latin Duo or Group
**Shakira**; Gloria Estefan; Karol G; Natti Natasha; Rosalía	**Fuerza Regida**; Clave Especial; Grupo Firme; Grupo Frontera; Julión Álvarez y su Norteño Banda
Breakthrough Latin Artist	Best Latin Song
**Kapo**; Beéle; Netón Vega	**Bad Bunny – "Nuevayol"**; Fuerza Regida – "Marlboro Rojo"; Fuerza Regida and Grupo Frontera – "Me Jalo"; Karol G – "Latina Foreva"; Selena Gomez, Benny Blanco and The Marías – "Ojos Tristes"
Best Latin Album	Best Rock/Alternative Artist
**Karol G – Tropicoqueta**; Fuerza Regida – 111xpantia; Netón Vega – Mi Vida Mi Muerte; Peso Pluma and Tito Double P – Dinastía; Rosalía – Lux	**Twenty One Pilots**; Deftones; Linkin Park; The Marías; Sleep Token
Breakthrough Rock/Alternative Artist	Best Rock/Alternative Song
**Sombr**; Geese; Gigi Perez	**Sombr – "Back to Friends"**; Noah Kahan – "The Great Divide"; Linkin Park – "Up From the Bottom"; Sublime – "Ensenada"; Tame Impala – "Dracula"
Best Rock/Alternative Album	Best Dance/Electronic Artist
**Sombr – I Barely Know Her**; Sleep Token – Even in Arcadia; Tame Impala – Deadbeat; Twenty One Pilots – Breach; Zach Bryan – With Heaven on Top	**David Guetta**; Calvin Harris; Fred Again; Illenium; John Summit
Best Male K-Pop Artist	Best Female K-Pop Artist
**BTS**; Ateez; Enhypen; Stray Kids; Tomorrow X Together	**Twice**; Aespa; Blackpink; Illit; Le Sserafim
Best Afrobeats Artist	Best Americana/Folk Artist
**Tyla**; Burna Boy; Moliy; Rema; Wizkid	**Noah Kahan**; Lord Huron; The Lumineers; Mumford & Sons; Tyler Childers

=== Special awards ===
On May 13, 2026, it was announced Karol G would be honored with the International Artist Award of Excellence. Billy Idol was announced as the recipient of the Lifetime Achievement Award on May 14. Darius Rucker was announced as the recipient of the Veterans Voice Award on May 19.

International Artist Award	Lifetime Achievement Award
**Karol G**	**Billy Idol**
Veterans Voice Award
**Darius Rucker**
