= List of Billboard number-one regional Mexican songs of 2025 =

Hot Regional Mexican Songs and Regional Mexican Airplay are charts that ranked the most-played regional Mexican songs in the United States.

== Chart history ==
Chart history
Issue date	Hot Regional Mexican Songs			Regional Mexican Airplay		
Issue date	Title	Artist(s)	Ref.	Title	Artist(s)	Ref.
January 4	—N/a			"Amor Bonito"	Luis Angel "El Flaco"	
January 11	—N/a			"Amor Bonito"	Luis Angel "El Flaco"	
January 18	—N/a			"No Me Se Rajar"	Alejandro Fernández	
January 25	—N/a			"Mi Lugar Favorito"	Edén Muñoz	
February 1	—N/a			"Tu Boda"	Óscar Maydon and Fuerza Regida	
February 8	—N/a			"Mi Lugar Favorito"	Edén Muñoz	
February 15	—N/a			"CHSM El Higado"	Gerardo Coronel "El Jerry"	
February 22	—N/a			"Voy a Levantarme"	Banda Los Sebastianes de Saul Plata	
March 1	—N/a			"El Sueno Americano"	Calibre 50	
March 8	—N/a			"Una Historia Mal Contada"	La Arrolladora Banda el Limon de Rene Camacho	
March 15	—N/a			"El Amor de Mi Herida"	Carín León	
March 22	—N/a			"El Amor de Mi Herida"	Carín León	
March 29	—N/a			"Pude"	Banda Carnaval	
April 5	—N/a			"Me Jalo"	Fuerza Regida and Grupo Frontera	
April 12	"Me Jalo"	Fuerza Regida and Grupo Frontera		"La Lotería"	Los Tigres del Norte	
April 19	"Me Jalo"	Fuerza Regida and Grupo Frontera		"Me Enamore"	La Original Banda El Limón	
April 26	"Me Jalo"	Fuerza Regida and Grupo Frontera		"Un Bendito Dia"	Yuridia and Alejandro Fernández	
May 3	"Me Jalo"	Fuerza Regida and Grupo Frontera		"Yo Me Lo Busque"	Los Angeles Azules y Thalia	
May 10	"Me Jalo"	Fuerza Regida and Grupo Frontera		"Mi Primer Dia Sin Ti"	Edén Muñoz	
May 17	"Me Jalo"	Fuerza Regida and Grupo Frontera		"No Se Dice"	Gerardo Coronel "El Jerry"	
May 24	"Me Jalo"	Fuerza Regida and Grupo Frontera		"Ahi Estabas Tu"	Carín León	
May 31	"Marlboro Rojo"	Fuerza Regida		"Vuelve a Mi"	Luis Angel "El Flaco"	
June 7	"Marlboro Rojo"	Fuerza Regida		"Une Peda Menos"	Banda Los Recoditos	
June 14	"Marlboro Rojo"	Fuerza Regida		"En Tiempo y Forma (Juntos)"	Josi Cuen and Jorge Medina	
June 21	"Marlboro Rojo"	Fuerza Regida		"Nicotina"	Somos 3 and La Fiera de Ojinaga	
June 28	"Marlboro Rojo"	Fuerza Regida		"Ya Me Vale Madre"	El Fantasma	
July 5	"Marlboro Rojo"	Fuerza Regida		"Un Millon de Primareras (Plaza de Toros la Mexico)"	Alejandro Fernández	
July 12	"Marlboro Rojo"	Fuerza Regida		"Me Gusta Mi Vida"	Intocable	
July 19	"Marlboro Rojo"	Fuerza Regida		"Por Esos Ojos"	Fuerza Regida	
July 26	"Marlboro Rojo"	Fuerza Regida		"Cuidala"	La Adictiva	
August 2	"Frecuencia"	Dareyes de la Sierra		"No Me Aprovechaste"	Banda El Recodo de Cruz Lizarraga	
August 9	"Frecuencia"	Dareyes de la Sierra		"Ya La Hice"	Banda Carnaval	
August 16	"Frecuencia"	Dareyes de la Sierra		"Tú Tú Tú"	Clave Especial and Edgardo Núñez	
August 23	"Marlboro Rojo"	Fuerza Regida		"Me Esta Doliendo"	Carín León and Alejandro Fernández	
August 30	"Marlboro Rojo"	Fuerza Regida		"Lejos Estamos Mejor"	Eden Munoz	
September 6	"Marlboro Rojo"	Fuerza Regida		"Mi Ex"	Grupo Firme and Los Tucanes de Tijuana	
September 13	"Marlboro Rojo"	Fuerza Regida		"Vivir Sin Aire"	Maná and Carín León	
September 20	"Marlboro Rojo"	Fuerza Regida		"Me Esta Doliendo"	Carín León and Alejandro Fernández	
September 27	"Marlboro Rojo"	Fuerza Regida		"Aunque Tiren Hate"	La Arrolladora Banda El Limón de René Camacho	
October 4	"Marlboro Rojo"	Fuerza Regida		"Ye Si Te Vas"	Oscar Ortiz and Carín León	
October 11	"Marlboro Rojo"	Fuerza Regida		"Supercargada"	Los Dos de Tamaulipas	
October 18	"Marlboro Rojo"	Fuerza Regida		"Que Haces Por Aca?"	Grupo Frontera and Mister Chivo	
October 25	"Marlboro Rojo"	Fuerza Regida		"De Esta Me Levanto"	Banda Los Recoditos	
November 1	"Marlboro Rojo"	Fuerza Regida				
November 8	"Marlboro Rojo"	Fuerza Regida				
November 15	"Marlboro Rojo"	Fuerza Regida				
November 22	"Marlboro Rojo"	Fuerza Regida				
November 29	"Marlboro Rojo"	Fuerza Regida				
December 6	"Marlboro Rojo"	Fuerza Regida				
December 13	"Marlboro Rojo"	Fuerza Regida				
December 20	"Marlboro Rojo"	Fuerza Regida				
December 27	"Marlboro Rojo"	Fuerza Regida				
