= List of Billboard Regional Mexican Albums number ones of 2025 =

The Regional Mexican Albums, published in Billboard magazine, is a record chart that features Latin music sales information for regional styles of Mexican music. This data are compiled by Nielsen SoundScan from a sample that includes music stores, music departments at department stores, verifiable sales from concert venues and track equivalent album units and streaming equivalent album units in the United States.

== Chart history ==
Issue date	Album	Artist(s)	Ref.
January 4	Incómodo	Tito Double P	
January 11	Incómodo	Tito Double P	
January 18	Incómodo	Tito Double P	
January 25	Incómodo	Tito Double P	
February 1	Incómodo	Tito Double P	
February 8	Incómodo	Tito Double P	
February 15	Incómodo	Tito Double P	
February 22	Incómodo	Tito Double P	
March 1	Incómodo	Tito Double P	
March 8	Mi Vida Mi Muerte	Netón Vega	
March 15	Mi Vida Mi Muerte	Netón Vega	
March 22	Mi Vida Mi Muerte	Netón Vega	
March 29	Mi Vida Mi Muerte	Netón Vega	
April 5	Mi Vida Mi Muerte	Netón Vega	
April 12	Mi Vida Mi Muerte	Netón Vega	
April 19	Mi Vida Mi Muerte	Netón Vega	
April 26	Mi Vida Mi Muerte	Netón Vega	
May 3	Mi Vida Mi Muerte	Netón Vega	
May 10	Mi Vida Mi Muerte	Netón Vega	
May 17	111xpantia	Fuerza Regida	
May 24	111xpantia	Fuerza Regida	
May 31	111xpantia	Fuerza Regida	
June 7	111xpantia	Fuerza Regida	
June 14	111xpantia	Fuerza Regida	
June 21	111xpantia	Fuerza Regida	
June 28	111xpantia	Fuerza Regida	
July 5	111xpantia	Fuerza Regida	
July 12	111xpantia	Fuerza Regida	
July 19	111xpantia	Fuerza Regida	
July 26	111xpantia	Fuerza Regida	
August 2	111xpantia	Fuerza Regida	
August 9	111xpantia	Fuerza Regida	
August 16	111xpantia	Fuerza Regida	
August 23	111xpantia	Fuerza Regida	
August 30	111xpantia	Fuerza Regida	
September 6	111xpantia	Fuerza Regida	
September 13	111xpantia	Fuerza Regida	
September 20	111xpantia	Fuerza Regida	
September 27	111xpantia	Fuerza Regida	
October 4	$ad Boyz 4 Life II	Junior H	
October 11	$ad Boyz 4 Life II	Junior H	
October 18	$ad Boyz 4 Life II	Junior H	
October 25	$ad Boyz 4 Life II	Junior H	
November 1	$ad Boyz 4 Life II	Junior H	
November 8	$ad Boyz 4 Life II	Junior H	
November 15	$ad Boyz 4 Life II	Junior H	
November 22	$ad Boyz 4 Life II	Junior H	
November 29	111xpantia	Fuerza Regida	
December 6	111xpantia	Fuerza Regida	
December 13	111xpantia	Fuerza Regida	
December 20	111xpantia	Fuerza Regida	
December 27	111xpantia	Fuerza Regida	
