= List of Billboard Regional Mexican Albums number ones of 2020 =

The Regional Mexican Albums, published in Billboard magazine, is a record chart that features Latin music sales information for regional styles of Mexican music. This data are compiled by Nielsen SoundScan from a sample that includes music stores, music departments at department stores, verifiable sales from concert venues and track equivalent album units and streaming equivalent album units in the United States.

== Chart history ==
Issue date	Album	Artist(s)	Ref.
January 4	Corridos Tumbados	Natanael Cano	
January 11	Corridos Tumbados	Natanael Cano	
January 18	Corridos Tumbados	Natanael Cano	
January 25	Corridos Tumbados	Natanael Cano	
February 1	Corridos Tumbados	Natanael Cano	
February 8	Corridos Tumbados	Natanael Cano	
February 15	Corridos Tumbados	Natanael Cano	
February 22	Corridos Tumbados	Natanael Cano	
February 29	Hecho En Mexico	Alejandro Fernández	
March 7	Corridos Tumbados	Natanael Cano	
March 14	Corridos Tumbados	Natanael Cano	
March 21	Corridos Tumbados	Natanael Cano	
March 28	Corridos Tumbados	Natanael Cano	
April 4	Corridos Tumbados	Natanael Cano	
April 11	Corridos Tumbados	Natanael Cano	
April 18	Corridos Tumbados	Natanael Cano	
April 25	Adicto	Fuerza Regida	
May 2	Corridos Tumbados	Natanael Cano	
May 9	Corridos Tumbados	Natanael Cano	
May 16	Corridos Tumbados	Natanael Cano	
May 23	Corridos Tumbados	Natanael Cano	
May 30	Corridos Tumbados	Natanael Cano	
June 6	Corridos Tumbados	Natanael Cano	
June 13	Tu Veneno Mortal	Eslabon Armado	
June 20	Tu Veneno Mortal	Eslabon Armado	
June 27	Tu Veneno Mortal	Eslabon Armado	
July 4	Tu Veneno Mortal	Eslabon Armado	
July 11	Tu Veneno Mortal	Eslabon Armado	
July 18	Tu Veneno Mortal	Eslabon Armado	
July 25	Tu Veneno Mortal	Eslabon Armado	
August 1	Vibras de Noche	Eslabon Armado	
August 8	Vibras de Noche	Eslabon Armado	
August 15	Vibras de Noche	Eslabon Armado	
August 22	Vibras de Noche	Eslabon Armado	
August 29	Vibras de Noche	Eslabon Armado	
September 5	Vibras de Noche	Eslabon Armado	
September 12	Vibras de Noche	Eslabon Armado	
September 19	Cruising with Junior H	Junior H	
September 26	Ayayay!	Christian Nodal	
October 3	Vibras de Noche	Eslabon Armado	
October 10	Vibras de Noche	Eslabon Armado	
October 17	Es Diferente	Porte Diferente	
October 24	Es Diferente	Porte Diferente	
October 31	Es Diferente	Porte Diferente	
November 7	Vibras de Noche	Eslabon Armado	
November 14	Vibras de Noche	Eslabon Armado	
November 21	Tu Veneno Mortal	Eslabon Armado	
November 28	Ayayay!	Christian Nodal	
December 5	Ayayay!	Christian Nodal	
December 12	Ayayay!	Christian Nodal	
December 19	Ayayay!	Christian Nodal	
December 26	Ayayay!	Christian Nodal	
