= Marlboro Rojo =

2025 song by Fuerza Regida

Song by Fuerza Regida

from the album 111xpantia
- Released: May 2, 2025
- Genre: Regional Mexican
- Length: 3:04
- Label: Rancho Humilde; Street Mob; Sony Music Latin
- Songwriter: Miguel Armenta
- Producers: JOP; Jorsshh; KMKZ; Meñostyle; Moisés López

"Marlboro Rojo" is a song by American regional Mexican band Fuerza Regida. It was released on May 2, 2025, through Rancho Humilde, Street Mob and Sony Music Latin, as part of their ninth studio album 111xpantia. Written solely by Miguel Armenta, the song peaked at number 64 on the Billboard Hot 100, additionally peaking atop the US Hot Regional Mexican Songs and Mexico Songs charts.

== Background and composition ==
In 2024, Fuerza Regida released their eighth studio album, Pero No Te Enamores, and a collaborative EP with Grupo Frontera, Mala Mía. Before the release of the latter, in November 2024, the band revealed to Rolling Stone en Español that they were working on new material, with lead singer Jesús Ortíz Paz stating that "Until December we have pure surprises".

On March 25, 2025, the band officially announced their ninth studio album, 111xpantia, and they released it on May 2, 2025, through Rancho Humilde, Street Mob and Sony Music Latin. Titled after the brand of cigarettes, Marlboro Red, the song is primarily influenced by Fuerza Regida's early norteño sound and uses reminiscent instrumentation from their 2018 song "Sigo Chambeando", relying on the usage of a tuba, charchetas and guitars.

== Release and reception ==
"Marlboro Rojo" was released on May 2, 2025, as the ninth track from Fuerza Regida's ninth studio album, 111xpantia. After its first tracking week, along with the rest of the album's standard version tracks, the song debuted at number 14 on the US Hot Latin Songs chart. The following week, its rose ten spots up to number four on the chart, earning 7.4 million official streams in the United States.

On the chart dated August 30, 2025, Marlboro Rojo replaced "DtMF" by Bad Bunny at #1 on the Hot Latin Songs chart, marking Fuerza Regida's third #1 hit on the chart after "Bebe Dame" and "Tu Boda"

== Charts ==
=== Weekly charts ===
Weekly chart performance for "Marlboro Rojo"
Chart (2025)	Peak position
Colombia Hot 100 (Billboard)	68
Global 200 (Billboard)	33
Mexico (Billboard)	1
US Billboard Hot 100	64
US Hot Latin Songs (Billboard)	1
US Hot Regional Mexican Songs (Billboard)	1

=== Year-end charts ===
Year-end chart performance for "Marlboro Rojo"
Chart (2025)	Position
Global 200 (Billboard)	154
US Hot Latin Songs (Billboard)	11

== Certifications ==
Region	Certification	Certified units/sales
Mexico (AMPROFON)	2× Platinum+Gold	350,000^{‡}
^{‡} Sales+streaming figures based on certification alone.
