= 111xpantia =

2025 studio album by Fuerza Regida

- Standard cover. Deluxe version cover is the same artwork, with its red and black colors swapped.

Studio album by Fuerza Regida
- Released: May 2, 2025
- Recorded: 2025
- Genres: Regional Mexican; country; reggaeton; EDM
- Length: 34:35
- Language: Spanish
- Labels: Street Mob; Rancho Humilde; Sony Latin
- Producers: Jesús Ortíz Paz; Chuyin; Herencia de Grandes; KMKZ; Lencho; Meñostyle; Miguel Armenta; Moisés López; Jorsshh; Nely; Tainy; Twenty9

Fuerza Regida chronology
Mala Mía (2024)	111xpantia (2025)

Singles from 111xpantia
- 1. "Por Esos Ojos" Released: February 11, 2025

111xpantia (stylized in all caps and pronounced Ixpantia in the Nahuatl language) is the ninth studio album by American regional Mexican band Fuerza Regida. It was released on May 2, 2025, through Rancho Humilde, Street Mob, and Sony Music Latin. The album's standard version features no guest appearances, making this their third non-guest appearance album and first since Otro Pedo, Otro Mundo (2020), although a deluxe version, which was released on May 5, 2025, features appearances from Anuel AA and Bellakath.

Serving as a follow-up to the band's previous album, Pero No Te Enamores (2024), and the collaborative EP Mala Mía with Grupo Frontera, 111xpantia was described as the band's "most important album" of their career. The album features artwork visuals directed by American artist and fashion designer Colm Dillane. The meaning of the album's title was described by lead vocalist Jesús Ortíz Paz to be linked to the album's artwork, which features a red-tinted eye, that it "means the same thing — ixpantia, 111, manifest — to make your dreams come true".

111xpantia was supported by its lead single, "Por Esos Ojos", which was initially performed at Paris Fashion Week on January 29, 2025, before being officially released onto streaming platforms on February 11, 2025. The album initially supported by a range of concert tour dates throughout Latin America, marketed as Esto No Es un Tour, with only two dates in the United States, marketed under the English name This Is Not a Tour. In 2026, the album was then supported by the This Is Our Dream Tour in the United States and Mexico. The album debuted at number two on the US Billboard 200, becoming the band's highest-charting album and the biggest debut for a regional Mexican album.

== Background and recording ==
On July 25, 2024, the band released their eighth studio album, Pero No Te Enamores, which saw them experimenting with a variety of urban genres, including regional Mexican and electronic dance music, as well as house and Jersey club. While the album received polarizing reactions from fans, it debuted at number 23 on the US Billboard 200 and number two on the US Top Latin Albums charts.

In November 2024, the band revealed to Rolling Stone en Español that they were recording new material, with lead singer Jesús Ortíz Paz stating that "Until December we have pure surprises". On December 19, 2024, the band released a collaborative EP with fellow band Grupo Frontera, titled Mala Mía. The EP contained its lead song "Me Jalo", which became a hit through virality on TikTok, peaking atop US Latin music airplay charts and the US Hot Regional Mexican Songs chart. On March 25, 2025, Fuerza Regida announced their ninth studio album, 111xpantia.

Revealing its recording process, Ortíz Paz said that around 40 songs were recorded for album but had instead narrowed it down to 12 songs, making sure that each one was a "focus track"; the tracks were recorded in their hometown, San Bernardino, California. Some of the album's tracks were written in Paris, with tololoche player Moises López producing them in San Bernardino.

== Concept and style ==
111xpantia is a regional Mexican album, said to "capture[...] the group's hustle, evolution, and deep connection to their roots". Additionally, the standard version does not include any features. For the first time, the group incorporated the usage of a banjo and synthesizers within the album, with lyrics revolving less around cartel culture and more around hip hop-established lyrical themes, such as partying and love. "Por Esos Ojos", the album's lead single, is a love ballad. One of the songs, "Marlboro Rojo", features a musical style similar to the group's debut studio album, Del Barrio Hasta Aquí, including the usage of a tuba, carchetas and guitars.

The album's title, 111xpantia, consists of two combined parts; the angel number "111" and the Nahuatl-language word for "manifestation", "ixpantia". It is also linked to the album's artwork, which was revealed on March 25, 2025; co-designed by Colm Dillane, it simply features a red-colored eye, which has been stated as "a symbol deeply tied to the album's themes". Ortíz Paz explained that it "means the same thing — ixpantia, 111, manifest — to make your dreams come true".

== Promotion and release ==
111xpantia was officially released on May 2, 2025, through Rancho Humilde, Street Mob and Sony Music Latin, for digital download and streaming. The album was also announced to have a physical release on CD and vinyl. A deluxe version of the album, which includes three additional tracks and guest appearances from Anuel AA and Bellakath, was released three days later, on May 5.

On January 29, 2025, Fuerza Regida performed a new song, "Por Esos Ojos", at Paris Fashion Week. With this performance, the band became the first regional Mexican act to perform at the event. After attaining anticipation from fans, the song was officially released onto digital and streaming platforms on February 11, 2025. Being the album's only pre-release single, it peaked at number 64 on the US Billboard Hot 100 and within the top 5 on the US Hot Latin Songs chart. To support 111xpantia, the band announced Esto No Es un Tour, which was a sequence of concert dates at arenas throughout Latin America. Its first date was on July 26, 2025, at Estadio GNP Seguros in Mexico City, while its final date was on September 20 of the same year at Estadio Mobil Super in Monterrey.

The band also announced two sole dates within the same tour under the English name This Is Not a Tour in the United States, with one date being on June 20, 2025, at Madison Square Garden in New York City, and the other date being on June 21 at the Hollywood Bowl in Los Angeles. On April 26, 2025, the band revealed the album's track listing, which was revealed onto artwork designed by Dillane. Aside from tour announcements to promote the album, other marketing included a skywritten message seen at Coachella 2025 and Easter egg hunts in a few California shopping malls, as well as Ortíz Paz going undercover as an elderly man and selling CDs of the album. On May 2, 2025, to further commemorate the album, the band collaborated with American publication Complex with a special pop-up that took place in Los Angeles until May 4 that same year.

In February 2026, the band announced a stadium tour in the United States and Mexico, titled the This Is Our Dream Tour. In August, a second leg of the tour was announced. In October, a record ten consecutive shows at Mexico's Palacio De Los Deportes was announced for 2027, after the band initially sold out eight shows.

== Commercial performance ==
Through mid-week predictions, 111xpantia was expected to debut within the top 10 of the US Billboard 200, which would become Fuerza Regida's first appearance within the album chart range. The album debuted at number two on the chart, earning 76,000 album-equivalent units. With this feat, the album became the largest week and highest charting for a Spanish-language album released by a duo or group on the chart. It also became the biggest debut and highest charting for a regional Mexican album, surpassing Peso Pluma's Génesis (2023) debuting at number three with 73,000 units. Although the album debuted only behind Bad Bunny's Debí Tirar Más Fotos on the chart, which rose six spots from number seven to number one following an official vinyl release, it also became the first time that two Spanish-language albums occupied the first and second positions on the chart in its 69-year history. The following week, the album fell four places down to number six on the chart, earning another 43,000 units.

Additionally, the album also debuted atop the US Regional Mexican Albums chart, earning the group their sixth number-one album and their third number-one debut on the chart, while it debuted number two on the US Top Latin Albums chart. The following week, the album rose to number one on the latter chart, becoming the band's second number-one album after their seventh studio album Pa Las Baby's y Belikeada (2023); it additionally sold another 6,000 copies within its second tracking week. All of the tracks from the album's standard version were also charting on the US Hot Latin Songs and the US Hot Regional Mexican Songs charts.

== Track listing ==
111xpantia track listing
No.	Title	Writer(s)	Producer(s)	Length
1.	"GodFather"	Chuyin; Daniel Guitérrez; Diego Millan; Jesús Ortíz Paz; Jorge Jiménez Sánchez	Ortíz Paz; Meñostyle; Moisés López	2:56
2.	"Ayy Weyy"	Ángel Guitérrez; Chuyin; Ortíz Paz; Jiménez Sánchez	Ortíz Paz; Jorsshh; López	2:28
3.	"Nocturno"	Ortíz Paz; Jiménez Sánchez	Ortíz Paz; Meñostyle; López	2:53
4.	"Peliculiando"	Chuyin; Guitérrez; Ortíz Paz; Jiménez Sánchez; José Hernández	Ortíz Paz; Jorsshh; Meñostyle; Miguel Armenta; Moisés López	3:29
5.	"Chavalitas"	Chuyin; Ortíz Paz; Jiménez Sánchez	Ortíz Paz; Meñostyle; López	2:44
6.	"Por Esos Ojos"	Ortíz Paz; Jonathan Caro; Jiménez Sanchez; Jose de Luna; Miguel Armenta; López	Ortíz Paz; Meñostyle; Armenta; López	3:08
7.	"Ansiedad"	Chuyin; Guitérrez; Ortíz Paz	Ortíz Paz; Meñostyle; López	2:32
8.	"Tu Sancho"	Chuyin; Jason Primera; Ortíz Paz; Jiménez Sánchez	Ortíz Paz; Meñostyle; López	2:57
9.	"Marlboro Rojo"	Armenta	Ortíz Paz; Jorsshh; KMKZ; Meñostyle; López	3:04
10.	"Chufulas"	Chuyin; Guitérrez; Ortíz Paz; Jiménez Sánchez	Ortíz Paz; Lencho; Armenta; López	2:45
11.	"Chaka"	Guitérrez; Ortíz Paz; Luis Ochoa; Oswaldo López	Ortíz Paz; Herencia de Grandes; Lencho; López	2:39
12.	"Caperuza"	Guitérrez; Ortíz Paz; Jason Primera; Jiménez Sánchez; Armenta	Ortíz Paz; Lencho; Armenta; López	2:59
Total length:				34:35

Deluxe version track listing
No.	Title	Writer(s)	Producer(s)	Length
13.	"Lokita" (with Anuel AA)	Emmanuel Gazmey; Jesús Amezcua; Ortíz Paz; Josias de la Cruz; Marco Masís; López	Nely; Tainy	3:29
14.	"Labubu" (with Bellakath)	Cristian Primera; Millan; Hilda Huerta; Ortíz Paz; Jiménez Sánchez; Armenta	Ortíz Paz; Twenty9	2:11
15.	"Como Tú"	Cristian Primera; Millan; Huerta; Ortíz Paz; Jiménez Sánchez; Armenta	Ortíz Paz; Meñostyle; López	2:38
Total length:				42:52

Notes

- "Tu Sancho" samples Ellie Goulding's vocals from her 2012 song, "Don't Say a Word".

== Personnel ==
- Jesús Ortíz Paz – executive producer, songwriting (all tracks except 9), producer
- Jimmy Humilde – executive producer
- Carlos Romero "Chapis" – mastering, mixing, recording engineer
- Toptear – recording engineer
- KMKZ – mixing (track 3)

== Charts ==
Chart performance for 111xpantia
Chart (2025)	Peak position
US Billboard 200	2
US Regional Mexican Albums (Billboard)	1
US Top Latin Albums (Billboard)	1

=== Year-end charts ===
Year-end chart performance for 111xpantia
Chart (2025)	Position
US Billboard 200	107

== Certifications ==
Certifications for 111xpantia
Region	Certification	Certified units/sales
Mexico (AMPROFON)	Diamond+2× Platinum	980,000^{‡}
^{‡} Sales+streaming figures based on certification alone.

== Release history ==
Release dates and formats for 111xpantia
Region	Date	Label(s)	Format(s)	Edition	Ref.
Various	May 2, 2025	Rancho Humilde; Street Mob; Sony Latin	CD; digital download; streaming; vinyl	Standard	
Various	May 5, 2025	Rancho Humilde; Street Mob; Sony Latin	Digital download; streaming	Deluxe	
