= Nel (song) =

2024 single by Fuerza Regida

Single by Fuerza Regida

from the album Pero No Te Enamores
- Released: August 9, 2024
- Genre: Jersey club; reggaeton
- Length: 2:29
- Label: Rancho Humilde; Street Mob; Sony Music Latin
- Songwriters: Jesús Ortíz Paz; Jason Primera; José Ignacio Hernández; Miguel Armenta
- Producers: JOP; Armenta; Twenty9

Fuerza Regida singles chronology
"Brillarosa" (2024)	"Nel" (2024)	"Secreto Victoria" (2024)

Music video
- "Nel" on YouTube

"Nel" is a song by American regional Mexican band Fuerza Regida. It was released on August 9, 2024, through Rancho Humilde, Street Mob and Sony Music Latin, as the lead single from their eighth studio album, Pero No Te Enamores (2024). It peaked at number 70 on the US Billboard Hot 100.

== Background and composition ==
Fuerza Regida announced their eighth studio album, Pero No Te Enamores, on July 16, 2024, revealing its track list a week later, with "Nel" being featured as the second track. The album's focus track, "Nel" features Jersey club beats on its first half, before transitioning into reggaeton rhythms.

== Release and reception ==
"Nel" was released as the second track from Fuerza Regida's eighth studio album, Pero No Te Enamores (2024), on July 25, 2024. Billboard named it the best track off the album, stating that it "not only challenges genre boundaries but also solidifies Fuerza Regida's position as fearless innovators in the Latin music scene, unafraid to evolve and provoke".

A week after release, it debuted at number 91 on the US Billboard Hot 100 and number five on the US Hot Latin Songs chart. They later performed the song, along with "Tú Name", at the 2024 Billboard Latin Music Awards on October 20, 2024.

== Charts ==
Chart performance for "Nel"
Chart (2024)	Peak position
El Salvador (ASAP EGC)	9
Guatemala (Monitor Latino)	10
Global 200 (Billboard)	63
Mexico (Billboard)	2
US Billboard Hot 100	70
US Hot Latin Songs (Billboard)	3
US Latin Airplay (Billboard)	45
