= Ferrari (Los Gemelos de Sinaloa, Clave Especial and Fuerza Regida song) =

2026 single by Los Gemelos de Sinaloa, Clave Especial and Fuerza Regida

Single by Los Gemelos de Sinaloa, Clave Especial and Fuerza Regida

from the EP AfterAfter
- Released: April 15, 2026
- Genre: Regional Mexican
- Length: 2:14
- Label: Street Mob; ATB
- Songwriter: Juan Moisés Cárdenas
- Producers: Juan Moisés Cárdenas; Alejandro Ahumada Nunez; Jesús Ortíz Paz; Roberto Cárdenas; Moisés López; Lenchostyle

Los Gemelos de Sinaloa singles chronology
"Pase de Pescado" (2025)	"Ferrari" (2026)

Clave Especial singles chronology
"4x4" (2026)	"Ferrari" (2026)

Fuerza Regida singles chronology
"Noche Perfecta" (2026)	"Ferrari" (2026)	"Todos nos Shipean" (2026)

Music video
- "Ferrari" on YouTube

"Ferrari" is a single by American regional Mexican bands Los Gemelos de Sinaloa, Clave Especial and Fuerza Regida, released on April 15, 2026 as the lead single from Clave Especial's upcoming EP AfterAfter.

== Composition ==
The song features horns, twelve-string guitars playing in a steady rhythm, and accordions providing melodic interludes. Lyrically, the song centers on achieving success through hard work and overcoming struggles.

== Charts ==
Chart performance for "Ferrari"
Chart (2026)	Peak position
US Billboard Hot 100	83
US Hot Latin Songs (Billboard)	6
