= Harley Quinn (song) =

Single by Fuerza Regida and Marshmello

from the album Pa Las Baby's y Belikeada and Sugar Papi
- Language: Spanish
- Released: December 14, 2023
- Genre: House; EDM; regional Mexican; corrido tumbado
- Length: 2:23
- Label: Sony Music Latin; Rancho Humilde; Street Mob
- Songwriters: Daniel Gutiérrez; Jesus Ortiz Paz; Jesús Rodríguez Jr.; Jonathan Caro; Miguel Armenta; Moises López; Osbaldo Sánchez
- Producers: Marshmello; Ortíz Paz; Miguel Armenta; Ángel Tumbado; Munk

Fuerza Regida singles chronology
"Pradax" (2023)	"Harley Quinn" (2023)	"Tacata" (Remix) (2023)

Marshmello singles chronology
"Water" (Remix) (2023)	"Harley Quinn" (2023)	"Dreaming" (2023)

Music video
- "Harley Quinn" on YouTube

"Harley Quinn" is a song by American regional Mexican band Fuerza Regida and electronic music producer Marshmello. It was released on December 14, 2023 through Sony Music Latin and Street Mob, serving as the third single and fifteenth track on the formers' album Pa Las Baby's y Belikeada (2023). It is also included as the final track on the latter's album Sugar Papi (2023).

== Composition ==
Produced by Marshmello, with co-production handled by Jesús Ortíz Paz, Miguel Armenta, Ángel Tumbado, and Munk, the song blends regional Mexican music, corridos tumbados in particular, with house music and electronic dance music. The song was written by Ortíz Paz, Jesús Rodríguez Jr., Jonathan Caro, Miguel Armenta, Moises López, and Osbaldo Sánchez.

== Music video ==
An official music video was uploaded to YouTube, on the formers' channel, on December 14, 2023, directed by Justice Silvera and produced by Mike Breslauer. The video shows, in different timestamps, both artists partying, Marshmello in a Charro outfit and as a referee in a lucha libre ring, JOP of Fuerza Regida in a law enforcement vehicle and JOP shooting piñatas with his partner.

== Commercial performance ==
In the week ending on November 11, 2023, the song became the second most streamed song in Mexico on Spotify, behind "Qué Onda", later becoming the most streamed song in the region for the week after. and days after the release of Pa Las Baby's y Belikeada, it became the sixth most streamed song on Apple Music in Mexico.

The song peaked at number 40 on the US Billboard Hot 100 and topped the chart in Mexico, spending seven weeks atop of the latter chart. It also peaked at number two on Hot Latin Songs and number 14 on the Billboard Global 200. On the issue dated February 3, 2024, "Harley Quinn" topped both US Latin Airplay and US Regional Mexican Airplay charts.

== Charts ==
=== Weekly charts ===
Weekly chart performance for "Harley Quinn"
Chart (2023–2024)	Peak position
Bolivia (Billboard)	8
Ecuador (Billboard)	10
Global 200 (Billboard)	14
Mexico (Billboard)	1
US Billboard Hot 100	40
US Hot Latin Songs (Billboard)	2
US Latin Airplay (Billboard)	1
US Regional Mexican Airplay (Billboard)	1

=== Year-end charts ===
Year-end chart performance for "Harley Quinn"
Chart (2024)	Position
Global 200 (Billboard)	136
US Hot Latin Songs (Billboard)	6
US Latin Airplay (Billboard)	19
US Regional Mexican Airplay (Billboard)	24

== Certifications ==
Certifications for "Harley Quinn"
Region	Certification	Certified units/sales
Mexico (AMPROFON)	2× Diamond+2× Platinum	1,680,000^{‡}
United States (RIAA)	27× Platinum (Latin)	1,620,000^{‡}
^{‡} Sales+streaming figures based on certification alone.
