= Tu Sancho =

2025 song by Fuerza Regida

Song by Fuerza Regida

from the album 111xpantia
- Released: May 2, 2025
- Genre: Regional Mexican; Art pop
- Length: 2:57
- Label: Rancho Humilde; Street Mob; Sony Music Latin
- Songwriters: Chuyin; Jason Primera; Jesús Ortíz Paz; Jorge Jiménez Sánchez
- Producers: JOP; Meñostyle; Moisés López

"Tu Sancho" is a song by American regional Mexican band Fuerza Regida, released on May 2, 2025 from their ninth studio album 111xpantia. It contains a vocal sample of "Don't Say a Word" by Ellie Goulding.

Jesús Ortíz Paz commented on the sample, "In the hip-hop, reggaeton world, everybody uses samples, and in our genre, nobody does. This brings the extra little sauce on the album."

== Critical reception ==
Isabela Raygoza of Billboard called the sample "hypnotic" and described it as "seamlessly woven into 'Tu Sancho,' adding another surprise element for fans diving into the album's details."

== Charts ==
=== Weekly charts ===
Chart performance for "Tu Sancho"
Chart (2025)	Peak position
Global 200 (Billboard)	19
Mexico (Billboard)	1
US Billboard Hot 100	65
US Hot Latin Songs (Billboard)	4
US Hot Regional Mexican Songs (Billboard)	3

=== Year-end charts ===
Year-end chart performance for "Tu Sancho"
Chart (2025)	Position
Global 200 (Billboard)	147
US Hot Latin Songs (Billboard)	19

== Certifications ==
Region	Certification	Certified units/sales
Mexico (AMPROFON)	3× Platinum	420,000^{‡}
^{‡} Sales+streaming figures based on certification alone.
