= Tu Boda =

2024 single by Óscar Maydon and Fuerza Regida

Single by Óscar Maydon and Fuerza Regida

from the album Rico o Muerto, Vol. 1
- Language: Spanish
- English title: "Your Wedding"
- Released: 26 September 2024
- Genre: corrido tumbado; sierreño
- Length: 3:45
- Label: Rancho Humilde; Sony Latin
- Songwriter: Alexis Fierro
- Producers: Óscar Maydon; Alexis Fierro; Jimmy Humilde; Joel Núñez; Ivan Tanori

Óscar Maydon singles chronology
"Mejores Jordans" (2024)	"Tu Boda" (2024)	"Corridos y Alcohol" (2024)

Fuerza Regida singles chronology
"Pero No Te Enamores" (2024)	"Tu Boda" (2024)	"Me Acostumbre a Lo Bueno II" (2024)

Music video
- "Tu Boda" on YouTube

"Tu Boda" (transl. "Your Wedding") is a song by Mexican singer Óscar Maydon and American regional Mexican band Fuerza Regida. It was released on 26 September 2024, through Rancho Humilde and Sony Music Latin, as the lead single from the former's third studio album, Rico o Muerto, Vol. 1 (2025). It is the second collaboration between both artists, after the 2023 single "Antidoto". Despite controversy surrounding the song's lyrics, it attained commercial success, peaking at number 22 on the US Billboard Hot 100 and number four on the Billboard Global 200.

== Background and music ==
Fellow Mexican songwriter Alexis Fierro, also known as El Chachito, first came up with a melody and lyrics for "Tu Boda" at a time he was exhausted due to a tiring travel schedule. Inspired by the Tim Burton-directed film Corpse Bride, he also performed a sample of the song with a guitar. Impressed by the song, Óscar Maydon spent a set of days producing its guitar and tololoche arrangements, which were written through vocal sounds.

"Tu Boda" was released for digital download and streaming on 26 September 2024, through Rancho Humilde and Sony Music Latin. Musically, "Tu Boda" is a corrido tumbado-sierreño song, which thematically revolves about a man who is seeing his loved one marry someone else. It also revolves around him wanting to die along with his ex-partner in the lyric, "Quiero que bailemos juntos / En el cielo o el infierno" (transl. "I want us to dance together / In heaven or hell").

== Reception ==
=== Commercial ===
On the issue dated 2 November 2024, "Tu Boda" debuted at number 23 on the US Billboard Hot 100, with 15.2 million streams and 1,000 digital song downloads, making it both artists' highest chart entry. The song also peaked atop the US Hot Latin Songs, Latin Streaming Songs and Latin Digital Song Sales charts, with it being its debut position on the latter.

"Tu Boda" also reached the top 10 of the Billboard Global 200 chart on the issue dated 2 November 2024, rising to a peak of number four from number 22 on the issue dated 2 November 2024, with 75.1 million streams worldwide. On the same issue date, it rose from number 17 to number five on the Billboard Global Excl. US chart, with 60.1 million streams. It became both artists' first top-10 entry on both charts. In its next week, it rose to a peak of number four on the latter chart.

In other countries, "Tu Boda" peaked atop song charts in Bolivia, Ecuador, and Mexico, while it charted within the top 10 in El Salvador (8) and Guatemala (6).

=== Controversy ===
It was met with criticism for its lyrics, specifically the lyric reading, "Quiero manchar el vestido blanco de rojo" (transl. "I want to stain the white dress red"), which were suspected to promote femicide. As a result, some users have asked the Institute of Women to take down the song from music platforms, though the Institute have yet to release a statement.

== Promotion ==
=== Music video ===
An accompanying music video for "Tu Boda" was released on 14 October 2024, following its accompanying lyric video that was released simultaneously with the song. Directed by Jessy Terrero, it begins with Maydon, who is dressed for a wedding, exiting a car. A woman is also seen about to get married with a statue at the wedding, where Maydon is also seen singing the chorus. Jesús Ortíz Paz of Fuerza Regida is also seen singing in front of a car with a woman on it. In various scenes, both singers and the woman are also seen in a room with neon lighting and around a portal on fire.

=== Live performances ===
Both artists performed "Tu Boda" for the first time on 2 November 2024 at the Don't Fall in Love Fest in San Bernardino, California.

== Charts ==
=== Weekly charts ===
Weekly chart performance for "Tu Boda"
Chart (2024–2025)	Peak position
Bolivia (Billboard)	1
Central America (Monitor Latino)	7
Colombia (Billboard)	15
Costa Rica (FONOTICA)	16
Costa Rica (Monitor Latino)	6
Ecuador (Billboard)	1
El Salvador (Monitor Latino)	4
Global 200 (Billboard)	4
Guatemala (Monitor Latino)	1
Mexico (Billboard)	1
Peru (Billboard)	15
US Billboard Hot 100	22
US Hot Latin Songs (Billboard)	1
US Latin Airplay (Billboard)	2
US Regional Mexican Airplay (Billboard)	1

=== Year-end charts ===
Year-end chart performance for "Tu Boda"
Chart (2025)	Position
Global 200 (Billboard)	45
US Billboard Hot 100	87
US Hot Latin Songs (Billboard)	6

== Certifications ==
Certifications for "Tu Boda"
Region	Certification	Certified units/sales
Mexico (AMPROFON)	3× Diamond+2× Platinum+Gold	2,450,000^{‡}
United States (RIAA)	28× Platinum (Latin)	1,680,000^{‡}
^{‡} Sales+streaming figures based on certification alone.

== See also ==
- 2024 in Latin music
- List of Latin songs on the Billboard Hot 100
- List of Billboard Hot Latin Songs and Latin Airplay number ones of 2024
- List of Billboard number-one regional Mexican songs of 2025
