= Mala Mía (EP) =

2024 EP by Fuerza Regida and Grupo Frontera

EP by Fuerza Regida and Grupo Frontera
- Released: December 19, 2024
- Genres: Cumbia; Norteño; corridos tumbados
- Length: 16:40
- Language: Spanish
- Labels: Rancho Humilde; Street Mob; Sony Music Latin
- Producers: Grupo Frontera; Jesús Ortíz Paz; Carlos Gutiérrez López; Édgar Barrera; Moises López; Miguel Armenta; Roberto Gutiérrez López

Fuerza Regida chronology
Pero No Te Enamores (2024)	Mala Mía (2024)	111xpantia (2025)

Grupo Frontera chronology
Jugando a Que No Pasa Nada (2024)	Mala Mía (2024)

Mala Mía (transl. My Bad) is a collaborative extended play by American regional Mexican bands Fuerza Regida and Grupo Frontera. It was released on December 19, 2024, through Sony Music Latin, Rancho Humilde and Street Mob. Additional guest appearances include Óscar Maydon and Armenta. With the addition of the EP's five tracks, both bands have collaborated in a total of seven songs, while it is their first collaborative project.

== Background and composition ==
On December 18, 2024, Fuerza Regida and Grupo Frontera announced on social networks that they would release an EP titled Mala Mía, additionally revealing its track list. The EP compromises of five tracks, with each one being in different musical styles, including cumbias, Norteño and corridos tumbados, with the entirety of the EP thematically surrounding love affairs, heartbreak, and desire. Production for the EP was handled by Armenta, who is also featured on "Aurora", along with Édgar Barrera, Grupo Frontera, Jesús Ortíz Paz and Moises López.

== Track listing ==
Mala Mía track listing
No.	Title	Length
1.	"Me Jalo"	3:32
2.	"0 Sentimientos"	2:38
3.	"SOS"	2:49
4.	"Coqueta"	4:02
5.	"Aurora" (with Óscar Maydon featuring Armenta)	3:39
Total length:		16:40

== Charts ==
Weekly chart performance for Mala Mía
Chart (2025)	Peak position
US Regional Mexican Albums (Billboard)	6
US Top Latin Albums (Billboard)	9
