= Dolido Pero No Arrepentido =

EP by Fuerza Regida
- Released: February 9, 2024
- Genre: Regional Mexican
- Length: 16:36
- Language: Spanish
- Label: Sony Music Latin; Street Mob; Rancho Humilde
- Producer: Charly Gtz; Jesús Ortíz Paz; Jimmy Humilde; Moises López; Miguel Armenta; Oswaldo Yahir López Alderete; Rabba

Fuerza Regida chronology
| Pa Las Baby's y Belikeada (2023) | Dolido Pero No Arrepentido (2024) | Pero No Te Enamores (2024) |

Singles from Dolido Pero No Arrepentido
- 1. "Tú Name" Released: March 21, 2024; 2. "Brillarosa" Released: May 2, 2024

Dolido Pero No Arrepentido (transl. Hurt But Not Regretful) is the third extended play by American regional Mexican band Fuerza Regida, which was released on February 9, 2024, through Sony Music Latin, Street Mob and Rancho Humilde.

== Background ==
Days after Dolido Pero No Arrepentido was announced, lead vocalist Jesús Ortíz Paz, along with three men, were arrested at the Calexico–Mexicali border for possession of drugs, and were released on February 6, 2024. It was supported with the hit single "Tú Name", which peaked at number 66 on the Billboard Hot 100 and was released on March 21, 2024.

== Commercial performance ==
Dolido Pero No Arrepentido debuted at numbers seven and three on the US Top Latin Albums and Regional Mexican Albums charts, respectively, with 14,000 album-equivalent units. It also debuted at number 69 on the Billboard 200, with all six tracks debuting on the US Hot Latin Songs chart.

== Track listing ==
Dolido Pero No Arrepentido track listing
| No. | Title | Writer(s) | Producer(s) | Length |
|---|---|---|---|---|
| 1. | "Enculado" | Daniel Gutiérrez; Jesús Ortíz Paz; Jonathan Caro | Moises López; Jesús Ortíz Paz; Jimmy Humilde | 2:28 |
| 2. | "Brillarosa" | Jesús Iván Amezcua Ortiz; Jorge Jiménez Sanchez; Jose Ignacio Hernández; Ortíz Paz; Osbaldo Sánchez; Ricardo Frías | Charlie Gtz; Gutiérrez; Miguel Armenta; Ortíz Paz; Rabba | 2:50 |
| 3. | "Tu Name" | Hernández; Gustavo Angel Raya Garcia; Jason Primera; Jorge Ontiveros; López; Ortiz Paz; Rudy Topete; Sánchez | Humilde; López; Ortíz Paz | 2:32 |
| 4. | "Oye" | Jesús Rodríguez; Ortíz Paz; Oswaldo Yahir López Alderete | Humilde; López; Ortíz Paz; López Alderete | 2:41 |
| 5. | "Falsa" | Jesús Rodríguez; Ortíz Paz; Oswaldo Yahir López Alderete; Topete | Humilde; López; Ortíz Paz; López Alderete | 2:36 |
| 6. | "Pxtxs" | Carlos Julián Martínez; Ernesto Jose Suárez Márquez; Ortíz Paz; Sara Schell | Humilde; López; Ortíz Paz | 3:29 |
| Total length: | | | | 16:36 |

== Charts ==
Chart performance for Dolido Pero No Arrepentido
| Chart (2024) | Peak position |
|---|---|
| US Billboard 200 | 69 |
| US Regional Mexican Albums (Billboard) | 3 |
| US Top Latin Albums (Billboard) | 6 |

== Certifications ==
Certifications for Dolido Pero No Arrepentido
| Region | Certification | Certified units/sales |
|---|---|---|
| United States (RIAA) | 5× Platinum (Latin) | 300,000^{‡} |
^{‡} Sales+streaming figures based on certification alone.
