= Por Esos Ojos =

2025 single by Fuerza Regida

Single by Fuerza Regida

from the album 111xpantia
- Language: Spanish
- Released: February 11, 2025
- Genre: Regional Mexican, corrido tumbado
- Length: 3:08
- Label: Rancho Humilde; Street Mob; Sony Music Latin
- Songwriters: Jesús Ortíz Paz; Jonathan Caro; Miguel Armenta; Jorge Jiménez Sanchez; Jose de Luna; Moisés López
- Producers: JOP; Armenta; López; Meñostyle

Fuerza Regida singles chronology
"Como Estrella" (2024)	"Por Esos Ojos" (2025)	"Chula Vente" (2025)

Music video
- "Por Esos Ojos" on YouTube

"Por Esos Ojos" (transl. "For Those Eyes") is a song by American regional Mexican band Fuerza Regida, released on February 11, 2025, serving as the lead single from their ninth studio album 111xpantia (2025). Featuring co-production from lead vocalist Jesús Ortíz Paz and band member Moisés López, the song was first performed at Paris Fashion Week in January 2025. Following its official release on streaming services, which was supported by high anticipation among fans from snippets spread online, it peaked at number 64 on the US Billboard Hot 100.

== Background ==
In January 2025, Fuerza Regida performed "Por Esos Ojos" at Paris Fashion Week. Prior to its official release, snippets of the performance spread around social media, attaining high anticipation from fans for its full release. On March 25, 2025, the band announced their ninth studio album 111xpantia, additionally stating that "Por Esos Ojos" would be its lead single.

== Composition ==
"Por Esos Ojos" is a corridos tumbados song. It contains funky bass lines and electric guitar, with lyrics about a person who has attained success after overcoming hardships but still longs for the one they love.

== Charts ==
=== Weekly charts ===
Weekly chart performance for "Por Esos Ojos"
Chart (2025)	Peak position
Global 200 (Billboard)	49
Mexico (Billboard)	3
US Billboard Hot 100	64
US Hot Latin Songs (Billboard)	3
US Hot Regional Mexican Songs (Billboard)	4

=== Year-end charts ===
Year-end chart performance for "Por Esos Ojos"
Chart (2025)	Position
Global 200 (Billboard)	197
US Hot Latin Songs (Billboard)	10

== Certifications ==
Certifications for "Por Esos Ojos"
Region	Certification	Certified units/sales
Mexico (AMPROFON)	Diamond+Platinum+Gold	910,000^{‡}
^{‡} Sales+streaming figures based on certification alone.
