= Adicto (album) =

Studio album by Fuerza Regida
- Released: April 10, 2020
- Genre: Regional Mexican
- Length: 28:33
- Language: Spanish
- Label: Rancho Humilde; Lumbre
- Producer: Jesús Ortíz Paz; Édgar Rodríguez

Fuerza Regida chronology
Pisteando con la Regida, Vol. 2 (2019)	Adicto (2019)	Otro Pedo, Otro Mundo (2019)

Singles from Adicto
- 1. "Estoy Aquí" Released: July 18, 2020

Adicto (transl. Addicted) is the second studio album by American regional Mexican band Fuerza Regida. It was released on April 10, 2020, through Rancho Humilde and Lumbre Music. It contains guest appearances from Grupo Codiciado, Natanael Cano and Herencia de Patrones. It peaked at number four on the US Top Latin Albums chart.

== Release and promotion ==
Adicto debuted at number four on the US Top Latin Albums chart, additionally debuting atop the US Regional Mexican Albums chart, with 5,000 album-equivalent units which consisted of 6.8 million official streams in the United States. In a mid-year list, Adicto was named as one of the best regional Mexican albums of the first half of 2020.

The band performed "Adicto" and "Estoy Aquí" from the album, as well as "Sigo Chambeando", as part of Rolling Stone's "In My Room" series.

== Track listing ==
Adicto track listing
No.	Title	Length
1.	"Intro"	0:36
2.	"Adicto"	3:08
3.	"18 Llantas"	2:12
4.	"Tiacentral" (with Grupo Codiciado)	4:07
5.	"Agusto "GTR""	2:54
6.	"Ando Contento" (with Natanael Cano)	2:52
7.	"P Town"	2:18
8.	"Tiempo de Brillar" (with Herencia de Patrones)	2:42
9.	"(S)enor"	2:28
10.	"Somos Mexicanos"	2:17
11.	"Estoy Aquí" (bonus track)	2:59
Total length:		28:33

== Charts ==
=== Weekly charts ===
Weekly chart performance for Adicto
Chart (2020)	Peak position
US Independent Albums (Billboard)	26
US Regional Mexican Albums (Billboard)	1
US Top Latin Albums (Billboard)	4

=== Year-end charts ===
Year-end chart performance for Adicto
Chart (2020)	Position
US Top Latin Albums (Billboard)	83
