= Del Barrio Hasta Aquí =

Studio album by Fuerza Regida
- Released: July 4, 2019
- Genre: Regional Mexican
- Length: 43:27
- Language: Spanish
- Labels: Rancho Humilde; Lumbre

Fuerza Regida chronology
Las Romanticas Favoritas de Fuerza Regida (2019)	Del Barrio Hasta Aquí (2019)	Pisteando con la Regida (2019)

Del Barrio Hasta Aquí (transl. From the Neighborhood to Here) is the debut studio album by American regional Mexican band Fuerza Regida. It was released on July 4, 2019, through Rancho Humilde and Lumbre Mueic. It won the award for Regional Mexican Album of the Year at the 2020 Billboard Latin Music Awards.

== Album cover ==
The album cover for Del Barrio Hasta Aquí sees the four members of Fuerza Regida crossing a street in front of a pawn shop in Santa Fe, New Mexico. It was noted to resemble the album cover for the Beatles's album Abbey Road (1969).

== Commercial performance ==
Del Barrio Hasta Aquí debuted at number 19 on the US Top Latin Albums chart, additionally debuting atop the US Regional Mexican Albums chart, with 2,000 album-equivalent units. On the former chart, it reached a peak of number eight the following week, with 4,000 album-equivalent units.

== Track listing ==
Del Barrio Hasta Aquí track listing
No.	Title	Length
1.	"30 Kilos"	3:08
2.	"Sigo Chambeando"	3:16
3.	"El Empiezo"	3:45
4.	"El Dinero Los Cambio"	3:08
5.	"Malos Pasos"	3:59
6.	"Les Voy a Placticar"	2:57
7.	"En Modesto Se La Pasa"	3:06
8.	"Aquel Morrillo"	3:36
9.	"Soy de Michoacan"	2:31
10.	"Aquí Sigo Yo"	2:08
11.	"Entre Files y las Huertas"	2:55
12.	"Rey del Humo"	2:54
13.	"Graffiteando Paredes"	2:53
14.	"Atlanta Hasta Florida"	3:11
Total length:		43:27

== Charts ==
=== Weekly charts ===
Weekly chart performance for Del Barrio Hasta Aquí
Chart (2019)	Peak position
US Regional Mexican Albums (Billboard)	1
US Top Latin Albums (Billboard)	8

=== Year-end charts ===
2019 year-end chart performance for Del Barrio Hasta Aquí
Chart (2019)	Position
US Regional Mexican Albums (Billboard)	12
US Top Latin Albums (Billboard)	38

2020 year-end chart performance for Del Barrio Hasta Aquí
Chart (2020)	Position
US Regional Mexican Albums (Billboard)	5
US Top Latin Albums (Billboard)	41

== Certifications ==
Certifications for Del Barrio Hasta Aquí
Region	Certification	Certified units/sales
United States (RIAA)	2× Platinum (Latin)	120,000^{‡}
^{‡} Sales+streaming figures based on certification alone.
