= Tú Name =

2024 single by Fuerza Regida

"Tu Name"

Single by Fuerza Regida

from the EP Dolido Pero No Arrepentido
- Released: February 9, 2024
- Genre: Regional Mexican
- Length: 2:32
- Label: Rancho Humilde; Street Mob; Sony Music Latin
- Songwriters: Jesús Ortíz Paz; Jason Primera; José Ignacio Hernández; Gustavo Ángel Raya García; Jorge Ontiveros; Osbaldo Sánchez; Rudy Topete; Moises López
- Producers: JOP; López

Fuerza Regida singles chronology
"Toretto" (2023)	"Tu Name" (2024)	"Money Edition" (2024)

Music video
- "Tu Name" on YouTube

"Tú Name" [sic] (English: "Your Name") is a song by American regional Mexican band Fuerza Regida and the lead single from their EP Dolido Pero No Arrepentido (2024).

== Background ==
Lead singer Jesús Ortíz Paz said that when he started writing the song, he predicted the song would be positively different from the other tracks for the EP, and "I thought about all my fans that are dolidos and I've seen a lot of heartbroken fans at my shows y yo escribí esta canción para que te olvides de su nombre". The lyrics of the song center on Paz forgetting about an ex-girlfriend by going out with other women. He mentions three of them by name: Brianna, Julianna and Tania.

== Music video ==
An official music video was released on March 21, 2024. It sees Paz shopping with multiple women, and shows gold necklaces spelling out the names mentioned in the song.

== Charts ==
=== Weekly charts ===
Weekly chart performance for "Tú Name"
Chart (2024)	Peak position
Global 200 (Billboard)	64
Mexico (Billboard)	13
US Billboard Hot 100	66
US Hot Latin Songs (Billboard)	2

=== Year-end charts ===
Year-end chart performance for "Tú Name"
Chart (2024)	Position
US Hot Latin Songs (Billboard)	9

== Certifications ==
Certifications for "Tú Name"
Region	Certification	Certified units/sales
Mexico (AMPROFON)	Diamond+4× Platinum	1,260,000^{‡}
^{‡} Sales+streaming figures based on certification alone.
