= Corridos Tumbados (album) =

Studio album by Natanael Cano
- Released: 31 October 2019
- Genre: Corridos tumbados
- Length: 54:40
- Language: Spanish
- Label: Rancho Humilde

Natanael Cano chronology
Todo Es Diferente (2019)	Corridos Tumbados (2019)	Mi Verdad Corridos Tumbados (2019)

Singles from Corridos Tumbados
- 1. "El Drip" Released: 18 October 2019; 2. "El Cazador" Released: 22 November 2019; 3. "Disfruto lo Malo" Released: 26 May 2021

Corridos Tumbados is the second studio album by Mexican musician Natanael Cano. It was released on 31 October 2019, through Rancho Humilde. The album also features collaborations and solo tracks performed by Junior H, Dan Sánchez and Nueva Era.

== Commercial performance ==
Corridos Tumbados debuted atop the US Regional Mexican Albums charts, with 6,000 album-equivalent units, making it his first number-one entry, and his first album entry overall, on the chart. In addition, it also debuted within at number five on the US Top Latin Albums chart. The album had spent 31 non-consecutive weeks atop the US Regional Mexican Albums chart until the issue dated 12 June 2021, when Cano's fifth studio album A Mis 20 (2021) debuted at number one.

== Track listing ==
Corridos Tumbados track listing
No.	Title	Length
1.	"El Drip"	2:23
2.	"El Nayer"	2:47
3.	"Disfruto lo Malo" (with Junior H)	3:07
4.	"El Cazador"	2:43
5.	"La M4" (performed by Junior H)	2:45
6.	"El Chamaquito" (with Dan Sánchez)	1:56
7.	"Iniciales AL (Porte Fino)"	3:22
8.	"Arriba del 300" (performed by Dan Sánchez)	2:36
9.	"El AK" (performed by Junior H)	3:49
10.	"Échele un Ojo" (with Dan Sánchez)	2:33
11.	"Un Suspiró al Viento" (with Nueva Era)	1:49
12.	"Música Pal Barrio"	1:56
13.	"Ahora" (performed by Dan Sánchez)	2:13
14.	"Cuando Los Tope" (performed by Dan Sánchez)	2:09
15.	"Ella" (performed by Junior H)	4:19
16.	"El León" (performed by Nueva Era)	2:29
17.	"Niño de Barrio" (performed by Nueva Era)	2:19
18.	"Cholos Malandros" (with Nueva Era)	1:55
19.	"Tranquilo Me Han de Ver" (performed by Dan Sánchez)	2:16
20.	"Buenos Ratos" (with Junior H)	2:22
21.	"Porte Placoson" (performed by Nueva Era)	2:52
Total length:		54:40

== Charts ==
=== Weekly charts ===
Weekly chart performance for Corridos Tumbados
Chart (2019–20)	Peak position
US Billboard 200	166
US Independent Albums (Billboard)	23
US Regional Mexican Albums (Billboard)	1
US Top Latin Albums (Billboard)	4

=== Year-end charts ===
2020 year-end chart performance for Corridos Tumbados
Chart (2020)	Position
US Regional Mexican Albums (Billboard)	1
US Top Latin Albums (Billboard)	9

2021 year-end chart performance for Corridos Tumbados
Chart (2021)	Position
US Regional Mexican Albums (Billboard)	3
US Top Latin Albums (Billboard)	25

2022 year-end chart performance for Corridos Tumbados
Chart (2022)	Position
US Regional Mexican Albums (Billboard)	13
US Top Latin Albums (Billboard)	59

2023 year-end chart performance for Corridos Tumbados
Chart (2023)	Position
US Regional Mexican Albums (Billboard)	15
US Top Latin Albums (Billboard)	52

== Certifications ==
Certifications for Corridos Tumbados
Region	Certification	Certified units/sales
United States (RIAA)	Platinum (Latin)	60,000^{‡}
^{‡} Sales+streaming figures based on certification alone.
