= Me Jalo =

2024 song by Fuerza Regida and Grupo Frontera

Song by Fuerza Regida and Grupo Frontera

from the EP Mala Mía
- Released: December 19, 2024
- Genre: Corrido; cumbia
- Length: 3:32
- Label: Rancho Humilde; Street Mob; Sony Music Latin
- Songwriters: Miguel Armenta; Jesús Ortíz Paz; Édgar Barrera; Moises López
- Producers: Armenta; JOP; Barrera; López

Music video
- "Me Jalo" on YouTube

"Me Jalo" (transl. "I'm Coming Over") is a song by American regional Mexican bands Fuerza Regida and Grupo Frontera. It was released on December 19, 2024, as the lead track from both bands' collaborative EP Mala Mía (2024). The song peaked at number 48 on the US Billboard Hot 100. Additionally, it is their second collaboration to peak atop both US Latin Airplay and Regional Mexican Airplay charts. An accompanying music video was released on January 21, 2025.

== Background and composition ==
On December 18, 2024, following the release of Fuerza Regida and Grupo Frontera's respective albums Pero No Te Enamores and Jugando a Que No Pasa Nada, they announced the release of their EP Mala Mía on social networks, additionally revealing its track list. "Me Jalo" was released the next day, on December 19, as the first track from the EP, which was released for digital download and streaming through Rancho Humilde, Street Mob and Sony Music Latin.

Produced by Édgar Barrera, along with Fuerza Regida members Jesús Ortíz Paz (JOP) and Moises López, and Miguel Armenta, "Me Jalo" blends the signature styles of Fuerza Regida and Grupo Frontera similar to other songs from Mala Mía. In this case, it combines Fuerza Regida's "lovelorn, jaded corridos" with Grupo Frontera's "lively accordion-driven cumbia pop". Lyrically, it revolves around someone in love and everything they can do to demonstrate their feelings and fall in love with their significant other.

== Commercial performance ==
On the issue dated April 5, 2025, "Me Jalo" reached the summit of both the US Latin Airplay and Regional Mexican Airplay charts, earning 10 million audience impressions in the United States; with this, both groups earned their fourth number-one song on the former chart and their second collaboration to top both charts. "Me Jalo" became the first number-one song of the US Hot Regional Mexican Songs chart, on the issue dated April 12, 2025, the chart's official launch date. Within the tracking week, it earned 8.1 million streams and 7.5 million radio audience impressions in the country.

== Music video ==
The music video was released in January 21, 2025. Directed by Miguel López and Abelardo Baez, it alternates between Jesús Ortíz Paz (JOP) in a bar and Grupo Frontera performing the song in a forest.

== Charts ==
=== Weekly charts ===
Weekly chart performance for "Me Jalo"
Chart (2025)	Peak position
Bolivia (Billboard)	6
Chile (Monitor Latino)	7
Costa Rica (Monitor Latino)	7
Global 200 (Billboard)	38
Guatemala (Monitor Latino)	11
Mexico (Billboard)	7
New Zealand Hot Singles (RMNZ)	26
Nicaragua (Monitor Latino)	3
Paraguay (Monitor Latino)	6
US Billboard Hot 100	48
US Hot Latin Songs (Billboard)	2
US Hot Regional Mexican Songs (Billboard)	1
US Latin Airplay (Billboard)	1
US Regional Mexican Airplay (Billboard)	1

=== Year-end charts ===
Year-end chart performance for "Me Jalo"
Chart (2025)	Position
Global 200 (Billboard)	138
US Hot Latin Songs (Billboard)	5

== See also ==
- List of Billboard Hot Latin Songs and Latin Airplay number ones of 2025
- List of Billboard number-one regional Mexican songs of 2025
