= Fuerza Regida =

American regional Mexican band

- Fuerza Regida in 2024

Background information
- Origin: San Bernardino, California, U.S.
- Genres: Regional Mexican; urban sierreño; corridos tumbados; Sinaloan banda; norteño; reggaeton; EDM; house
- Works: Fuerza Regida discography
- Years active: 2015–present
- Labels: Lumbre; Cinq; Rancho Humilde; Street Mob; Sony Latin
- Members: Jesús Ortíz Paz; Samuel Jáimez; Khrystian Ramos; José "Pelón" García; Moisés López
- Website: fuerzaregida.com

Fuerza Regida (Spanish: Fuerza Régida, Spanish pronunciation: [ˈfweɾsa reˈxiða]) is an American regional Mexican band formed in San Bernardino, California in 2015. The band currently comprises Jesús Ortíz Paz (vocals), Samuel Jáimez (12-string guitar), Khrystian Ramos (rhythm guitar), José "Pelón" García (tuba), and Moisés López (tololoche). Initially known as a norteño band, they have later incorporated several styles onto their music, including corridos tumbados, for which they are considered one of the pioneer groups.

After initially performing as a cover band starting 2015, they would eventually release a song titled "Radicamos en South Central", in 2018, which would receive success and eventually lead to a signing of a contract with Lumbre Music, where they later issued their first full-length release, the live album En Vivo Puros Corridos (2018). Eight of Fuerza Regida's studio albums, Del Barrio Hasta Aquí (2019), Adicto (2020), Otro Pedo, Otro Mundo (2020), Del Barrio Hasta Aquí, Vol. 2 (2021), Pa Que Hablen (2022), Sigan Hablando (2022), Pa Las Baby's y Belikeada (2023), and 111xpantia (2025) have peaked within the top 10 of the US Regional Mexican Albums chart, with their eighth studio album Pero No Te Enamores (2024) exploring EDM and other dance genres.

Some of the band's most notable songs include "Bebe Dame", "CH y la Pizza", "Harley Quinn", "Tú Name", "Nel", "Me Jalo" and "Marlboro Rojo", which have appeared on the US Billboard Hot 100 and the Mexico Songs charts and subsequently received certifications in both countries. Throughout their career, Fuerza Regida have earned one American Music Award, four Billboard Music Awards, 11 Billboard Latin Music Awards, and one Latin American Music Award. They have also been nominated for a Grammy and a Latin Grammy.

== History ==
=== 2015–2019: Formation, beginnings and Del Barrio Hasta Aquí ===
Before Fuerza Regida formed, guitarists Samuel Jáimez and Khrystian Ramos met at a martial arts gymnasium in 2013, and along with Ramos' cousin, they formed another band, Grupo Raimez. Lead vocalist Jesús Ortíz Paz, who was a barber at the time, was told by one of his friends that Grupo Raimez was looking for a bass player. He then arrived to one of their practice sessions with his bass and was asked if he sang, later becoming the group's singer. Some time later, Grupo Raimez went through a name change, as Ortíz Paz did not feel that "it's part of my shit", changing it to Fuerza Regida. During one of their first performances as a three-member group, they met tuba player José "Pelón" García, ultimately forming Fuerza Regida in March 2015, in San Bernardino, California, as a four-member cover band.

During their beginnings, Fuerza Regida performed at parties, and often stayed at motels before performing and relying on a busted tour bus. In 2017, they created a YouTube channel where they began to upload videos, also performing some songs written by themselves. Their cover of the Chayín Rubino's corrido, "Uno Personal", led to the band gaining recognition within the Inland Empire. Despite this, both Ortíz Paz and Ramos had temporary warehouse jobs to keep them financially stable, while García worked in construction "with benefits" and after the band were beginning their tour, he had to make a difficult decision of either leaving the band or his job. In 2018, one of their first singles, "Radicamos en South Central" went viral on YouTube and received the attention of Ramón Ruiz, frontman of the band Legado 7 and owner of Lumbre Music. Ruiz contacted Jesús Ortiz Paz, frontman of Fuerza Regida, to offer them a contract to join Lumbre, as well as signing them to the Rancho Humilde record label.

In mid-2018, the group released their first live album, En Vivo Puros Corridos, which contains previously released singles "Soy Montero", "Radicamos en South Central" and "Dos Plumas". On February 14, 2019, they released an EP consisting of covers, Las Románticas Favoritas de Fuerza Regida, to coincide with Valentine's Day. The EP peaked at number 19 on the Billboard Regional Mexican Albums chart, marking the group's first entry on any music chart in the United States. In July 2019, the group released their debut studio album Del Barrio Hasta Aquí, which eventually reached the top 10 on the Top Latin Albums chart, also peaking at number one on the Regional Mexican Albums chart. Ortíz Paz of the group told Billboard that "[he] never imagined being on a Billboard chart." In December 2019, they released their second live album Pisteando con la Regida, which contains covers of songs by other artists in the regional Mexican music genre such as Pedro Infante, Antonio Aguilar, Sergio Vega, and among others.

=== 2020–2021: Adicto, Otro Pedo, Otro Mundo, and Del Barrio Hasta Aquí, Vol. 2 ===
In January 2020, the group released their third live album, Pisteando con la Regida, Vol. 2, which also contains covers of songs by other regional Mexican artists, such as El Coyote, Chalino Sánchez, Los Intocables del Norte, Fidel Rueda and among others. In April 2020, the group was featured in the song "Cuenta Conmigo", along with Los Tigres del Norte, Ana Bárbara and Natanael Cano. The song was used by Univision and Uforia to campaign and invite Spanish speakers to participate in the 2020 United States census. The single was named by Rolling Stone as a "census anthem." Later that month, the group released their second studio album, Adicto, and the single "Agusto GTR". The album reached the top 5 on the Top Latin Albums chart and peaked at number one on the Regional Mexican Albums chart. Production on Adicto was done by Ortíz Paz and Edgar Rodríguez, who had also worked with Jenni Rivera, Gerardo Ortíz, and Natanael Cano. The band released their third studio album Otro Pedo, Otro Mundo in September 2020. Future tololoche player Moisés López provided bass on one of the album's songs, "Vamos Bien". They released a Christmas album titled Navidad con la Regida in December 2020.

In the beginning of 2021, the band collaborated with fellow band Calle 24 on "Qué Está Pasando," which was written by Diego Millán, lead vocalist of the latter, who expressed that he was a fan of Fuerza Regida. They would also release their fourth studio album and sequel Del Barrio Hasta Aquí, Vol. 2. In August, they released the single "Lo Vieron Pasar," and in October 2021, they released the single "Descansando" as a tribute to a close friend of Ortíz Paz who passed. The latter single became a hit in Mexico and the band would receive several nominations for it, such as Sierreña Song of the Year at the Premio Lo Nuestro 2023.

=== 2022: Pa Que Hablen and Sigan Hablando ===
In May 2022, Fuerza Regida released the single "Chingas a Tu Madre". In July 2022, the band released "Señor Miedo", and had announced the Del Barrio Hasta Aquí Tour, which began on July 23 at the SAP Center in San Jose, California and ended on December 2 at the Allstate Arena in Rosemont, Illinois. "Señor Miedo" was described as an apology for crime, since its lyrics mention Mexican drug lord El Mencho, later going viral on social media in August 2022 following the arrest of Ricardo Ruiz Velazco in Jalisco. In August, the band released a hit single with Edgardo Núñez, "Billete Grande". The hit single lead to being nominated a Latin American Music Award for Best Collaboration – Regional Mexican. Thanks to their Del Barrio Hasta Aquí tour, the group became the Mexican band with the most tickets sold that year in the United States. In November 2022, Fuerza Regida released a cover of the song "Chuy y Mauricio", titled "Chrysler 300". Days later, they released the single "Prefiero Empedarme", which was released along with a music video uploaded to the band's official YouTube channel. Musically and lyrically, the song talks about spite to the rhythm of a Sinaloan band played and recorded live. At the end of November they released the song "911" together with Grupo Frontera, co-written by Horacio Palencia and Edgar Barrera.

The release of "911" was accompanied by the release of the official music video, which accumulated 2.5 million views in its first three days of release, remaining in the top 10 videos in Mexico for its first two weeks. According to Bandamax, the single consolidated Grupo Frontera as one of the new emerging acts in Mexican music and Fuerza Regida as one of the most important bands at the time. The song was positioned at number 24 on the Hot Latin Songs list. In December 2022, together with Natanael Cano, they released "Ch y la Pizza". The song was trending on social media platforms such as TikTok. The music video accumulated 1.2 million views on its first day, being the sixth most viewed video globally on its opening day. After the release of "Ch y la Pizza", the band collaborated with Grupo Frontera for the second time on "Bebe Dame", which eventually debuted on number 91, later peaking at number 25, on the Billboard Hot 100, which marked the formers' first time appearing on the chart. The song would also reach number one on the Hot Latin Songs, Latin Airplay, Regional Mexican Airplay, and Mexico Songs charts. On December 30, the band released their sixth and seventh studio albums, Pa Que Hablen and Sigan Hablando, which were intended to be combined as a double album, but had split the tracklist in half, with 13 songs in each album and collaborations with artists such as Peso Pluma, Junior H, Eslabon Armado, Edén Muñoz, among others. At around this time, López joined the band as their fifth member.

=== 2023: Pa Las Baby's y Belikeada ===
In the beginning of 2023, Pa Que Hablen and Sigan Hablando charted on the Billboard Top Latin Albums chart, peaking at number five and number six, respectively. In February 2023, to coincide with Valentine's Day, Fuerza Regida and American singer Becky G released "Te Quiero Besar", which is the second time the latter released a song in the regional Mexican music genre, after the remix version of "Ya Acabó" with Mexican group Marca MP. On March 10, the band released a cover of Bobby Pulido's hit single "Desvelado". On May 4, the band collaborated with Puerto Rican rapper Myke Towers on the single "Pariente", marking the latter's first appearance in the regional Mexican music genre. Days later, the band released "TQM", which surfaced around TikTok on the day of its release. On June 22, the band released "Sabor Fresa".

In July, "Sabor Fresa" peaked at number 3 on the Hot Latin Songs chart, number 16 on the Global 200 and number 26 on the Billboard Hot 100, with "TQM" charting at number five, number 15, and number 34 in each chart, respectively. After the success of both singles, the band released "Tiki Taka Toco" with American production duo Take a Daytrip, which was used as the official song for the 2023 Leagues Cup and was released in partnership with Apple Music. On August 22, Fuerza Regida, along with Los Tucanes de Tijuana and Edén Muñoz, released the Spotify-exclusive single "La Tierra del Corrido". On August 29, the band had been signed into Sony Music Latin, through a partnership with Rancho Humilde. A day later, the band released "Qué Onda" with Calle 24 and Chino Pacas, which eventually peaked at 67 on the Billboard Hot 100, marking one of Calle 24's first chartings in any Billboard chart. On September 20, the band released "El Jefe" with Colombian singer Shakira, a protest song regarding the issue of labor discrimination. On October 20, Fuerza Regida released their eighth studio album, Pa Las Baby's y Belikeada, which combines several genres and contains collaborations with known artists such as Marshmello, María Becerra, Gabito Ballesteros, among others. From the album, "Harley Quinn" would become a hit, peaking at number 40 on the Billboard Hot 100.

=== 2024: Pero No Te Enamores ===
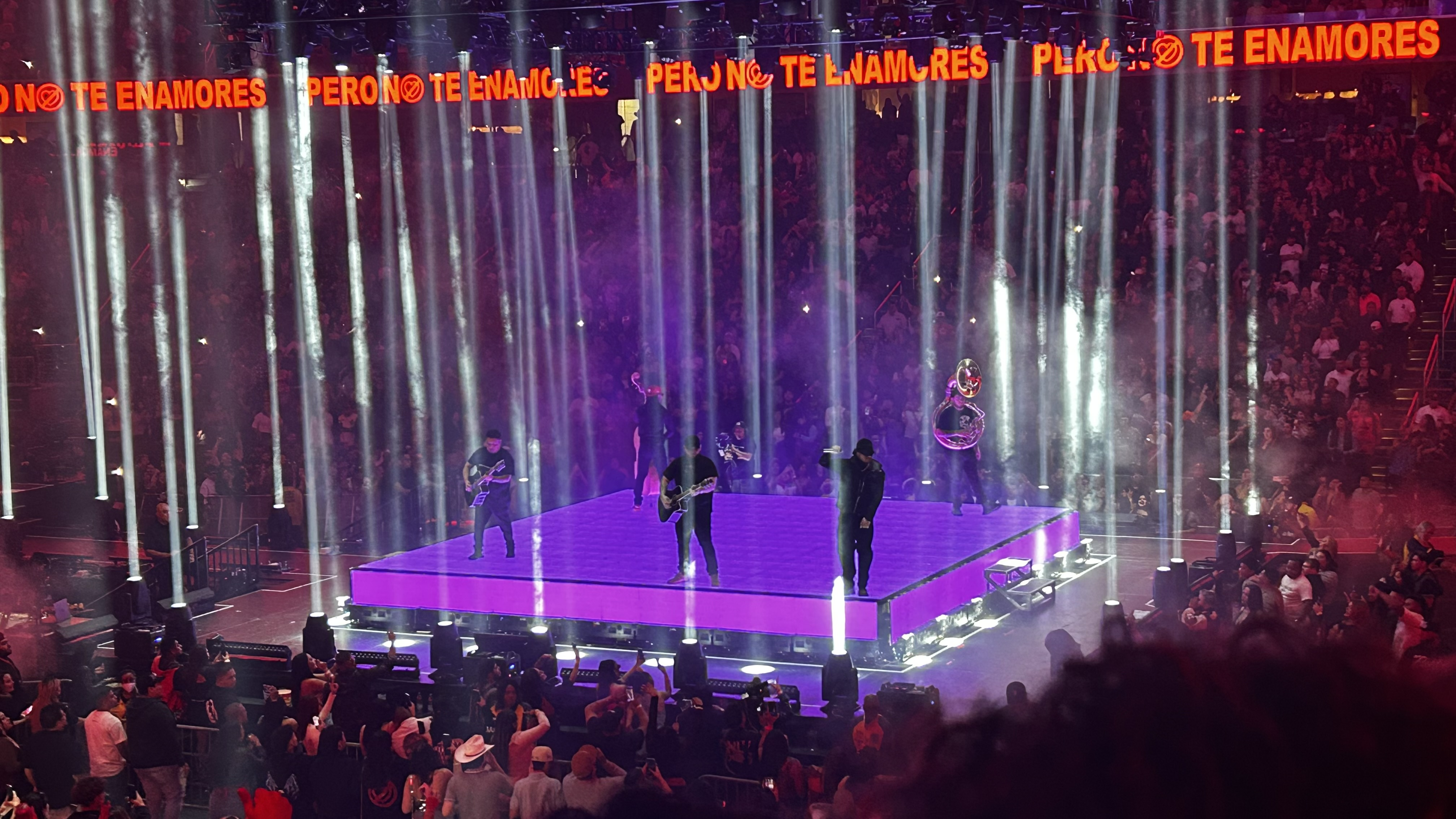
Fuerza Regida performing at the Pero No Te Enamores Tour in 2024.

In February 2024, lead vocalist Ortíz, along with three other men, were detained at the Calexico–Mexicali border for possession of drugs and marijuana. Ortíz would spend a few days in a Mexicali jail and would be released on February 6, 2024. Days after his release from jail, the band announced an EP titled Dolido Pero No Arrepentido, and was released on February 9, 2024, eventually debuting on the top 10 of the US Top Latin Albums chart and at number three on US Regional Mexican Albums. On March 7, the band collaborated with Edén Muñoz on the single "Money Edition", from the latter's studio album Edén (2024). The band would release "Tú Name" from the EP as a single, which became a hit, on March 21, 2024, along with its music video. On April 9, 2024, the band announced that they would embark the Pero No Te Enamores Tour, which began on June 6, 2024, and is set to conclude on November 16 of the same year.

On July 16, 2024, the band announced their eighth studio album Pero No Te Enamores, which they considered "the album [they've] invested the most money on". To promote the album, they published murals in major cities, which depicted a painting of a crossed-out heart, along with the album's release date. It was released on July 25, 2024, it contains guest appearances from Maluma and Bellakath. The album debuted at number 25 on the US Billboard 200, with the addition of a number-two peak on the US Top Latin Albums chart, with 23,000 album-equivalent units. On September 26, 2024, the band released the single "Tu Boda" with Óscar Maydon. It received criticism for its lyrics surrounding violence against women. On October 18 of the same year, the band appeared on various songs from Chino Pacas' debut studio album Que Sigan Llegando las Pacas (2024), including "Modo Capone" with Canadian rapper Drake.

=== 2025–present: 111xpantia ===
On the issue dated February 1, 2025, Fuerza Regida and Óscar Maydon's single "Tu Boda" reached the summit of the US Regional Mexican Airplay chart, with seven million audience impressions, becoming the band's fourth single to peak atop the chart. On February 4, Fuerza Regida and fellow band Calle 24 released the single "Como Estrella", which serves as the theme song for the Netflix-original series Celda 211. After performing it at Paris Fashion Week in January 2025, becoming the first regional Mexican act to do so, and attaining anticipation from fans, "Por Esos Ojos" was officially released onto digital and streaming platforms on February 11.

On March 25, 2025, the band announced their ninth studio album 111xpantia. 111xpantia was released on May 2, 2025, with a deluxe version with three additional tracks being released three days later, on May 5. The album was commercially successful, debuting at number two on the US Billboard 200 chart, though only behind Bad Bunny's Debí Tirar Más Fotos, becoming the largest week and highest charting for a Spanish-language album released by a duo or group on the chart, as well as the highest charting album by a regional Mexican act. It also became the first time that two Spanish-language albums occupied the first and second positions on the chart in its 69-year history.

On July 24, Fuerza Regida, alongside Luis R. Conriquez and Netón Vega, released the reggaeton track "Chula Vente", which was met with a polarized response from fans. On September 18, the band released a collaboration with Banda MS, "Seguro Le Dolió", which they both performed at a concert in Las Vegas earlier that same month. On September 24, Apple Music released a special recording of the band's performance at Estadio GNP Seguros that took place on July 26 of that same year. In October, Ortíz Paz announced the 2025 Don't Fall in Love Fest, which took place on November 22 and was featured performances by rappers including Future and Chief Keef, as well as regional Mexican artists including Netón Vega and Los Tucanes de Tijuana.

The band also received 15 nominations at the 2025 Billboard Latin Music Awards, winning five awards at the ceremony, which took place on October 23. At around this time, the band had gotten into a legal dispute with their label, Rancho Humilde, for withholding royalties and award submissions. On the issue dated November 8, 2026, the band's track "Marlboro Rojo" reached a peak of number on the US Regional Mexican Airplay chart. On November 13, the band performed that same song, along with "Me Jalo" with Grupo Frontera, at the 26th Annual Latin Grammy Awards. On December 10, the band was featured alongside Anuel AA on the official remix for Yung Beef and El Bogueto's track "Cuando No Era Cantante".

== Musical style ==
Fuerza Regida are primarily considered a corridos tumbados, norteño and sierreño band, with their musical influences ranging from regional Mexican music artists Ariel Camacho and Hijos de Barrón to the metal band Metallica. They often merge the sounds of regional Mexican music to that of urban music within their albums, with their lyrical themes revolving around street life and Mexican culture.

With the release of their seventh studio album Pa Las Baby's y Belikeada (2023), they began recording songs in different genres, including trap and reggaeton. The album also included its top-40 single "Harley Quinn", a collaboration with Marshmello, which blends corridos and house music, with the band coining this combination as "Jersey corridos". The album's follow-up, Pero No Te Enamores (2024), is composed entirely of electronic dance and house tracks, containing secondary musical influences drawn from bachata, hip hop, Jersey club, and reggaeton. This musical approach was mostly inspired by Canadian rapper Drake's album Honestly, Nevermind (2022).

The band later began recording regional Mexican music again with their ninth studio album 111xpantia (2025). Considered as their most important album, they incorporated the usage of a banjo and synthesizers within its tracks, with its lyrical themes revolving less around cartel culture and more around hip hop-established lyrical themes, such as partying and love.

== Philanthropy ==
On February 28, 2023, Fuerza Regida announced that they would donate $20,000 to the Inclusive Action for the City to encourage the legalization of street vending in Los Angeles. Further, February 28 was officially declared as Fuerza Regida Day by the Los Angeles City Council, with the band becoming the first in the regional Mexican scene to receive such distinction.

On January 11, 2025, members of the band rented out an hotel as a shelter for victims affected by Southern California wildfires, which took place that month. On June 10, 2025, the band took to Instagram to express their support for communities affected by the mass deportations in the United States that year. Two days following their statement, they announced the release of limited-edition hats on their site. Subsequently, they teamed up with content creator Druski to release limited-edition Coulda Been Records merch, with all proceeds from the merch and limited-edition hats going towards the Immigrant Defenders Law Center. Others have expressed concern of the band's debut performance at the Hollywood Bowl, on June 21 of that same year, being a target of the U.S. Immigration and Customs Enforcement (ICE). Ortíz Paz expressed his help and support for his fans and those who bought tickets, though stated that "the show must go on" amidst this situation.

On September 17, 2026, Fuerza Regida were presented the keys to the city to San Bernardino by mayor Helen Tran, with the band additionally announcing that they were developing a youth-focused community center in the city, which will support those interested in performing arts.

== Members ==
=== Current members ===
- Jesús Ortíz Paz – lead vocals (2015–present)
- Samuel Jáimez – backing vocals, 12-string guitar (2015–present)
- Khrystian Ramos – rhythm guitar (2015–present)
- José "Pelón" García – sousaphone (2015–present)
- Moisés López – tololoche (2022–present)

== Discography ==
=== Studio albums ===
- Del Barrio Hasta Aquí (2019)
- Adicto (2020)
- Otro Pedo, Otro Mundo (2020)
- Del Barrio Hasta Aquí, Vol. 2 (2021)
- Pa Que Hablen (2022)
- Sigan Hablando (2022)
- Pa Las Baby's y Belikeada (2023)
- Pero No Te Enamores (2024)
- 111xpantia (2025)

== Tours ==
- Del Barrio Hasta Aquí Tour (2022)
- Otra Peda Tour (2023)
- Pero No Te Enamores Tour (2024)
- This Is Our Dream Tour (2026)

== Awards and nominations ==
Award	Year	Category	Nominated work	Result	Ref.
American Music Awards	2025	Favorite Latin Duo or Group	Fuerza Regida	Nominated	
American Music Awards	2025	Favorite Latin Album	Dolido Pero No Arrepentido	Nominated	
American Music Awards	2025	Favorite Latin Song	"Tu Boda" (with Óscar Maydon)	Nominated	
American Music Awards	2026	Best Latin Duo or Group	Fuerza Regida	Won	
American Music Awards	2026	Best Latin Song	Marlboro Rojo	Nominated	
American Music Awards	2026	Best Latin Song	"Me Jalo" (with Grupo Frontera)	Nominated	
American Music Awards	2026	Best Latin Album	111xpantia	Nominated	
American Music Awards	2026	Album of the Year	111xpantia	Nominated	
Billboard Latin Music Awards	2020	Regional Mexican Album of the Year	Del Barrio Hasta Aquí	Won	
Billboard Latin Music Awards	2022	Duo/Group Hot Latin Songs Artist of the Year	Fuerza Regida	Nominated	
Billboard Latin Music Awards	2023	Artist of the Year	Fuerza Regida	Nominated	
Billboard Latin Music Awards	2023	Top Latin Albums Artist of the Year, Duo/Group	Fuerza Regida	Won	
Billboard Latin Music Awards	2023	Regional Mexican Artist of the Year, Duo or Group	Fuerza Regida	Won	
Billboard Latin Music Awards	2023	Duo/Group Hot Latin Songs Artist of the Year	Fuerza Regida	Nominated	
Billboard Latin Music Awards	2023	Top Latin Album of the Year	Pa Que Hablen	Nominated	
Billboard Latin Music Awards	2023	Regional Mexican Album of the Year	Pa Que Hablen	Nominated	
Billboard Latin Music Awards	2023	Regional Mexican Album of the Year	Sigan Hablando	Nominated	
Billboard Latin Music Awards	2023	Hot Latin Song of the Year	"Bebe Dame" (with Grupo Frontera)	Nominated	
Billboard Latin Music Awards	2023	Hot Latin Song of the Year, Vocal Event	"Bebe Dame" (with Grupo Frontera)	Nominated	
Billboard Latin Music Awards	2023	Regional Mexican Song of the Year	"Bebe Dame" (with Grupo Frontera)	Nominated	
Billboard Latin Music Awards	2023	Sales Song of the Year	"Bebe Dame" (with Grupo Frontera)	Nominated	
Billboard Latin Music Awards	2023	Streaming Song of the Year	"Bebe Dame" (with Grupo Frontera)	Nominated	
Billboard Latin Music Awards	2024	Artist of the Year	Fuerza Regida	Nominated	
Billboard Latin Music Awards	2024	Top Latin Albums Artist of the Year, Duo/Group	Fuerza Regida	Won	
Billboard Latin Music Awards	2024	Regional Mexican Artist of the Year, Duo or Group	Fuerza Regida	Won	
Billboard Latin Music Awards	2024	Duo/Group Hot Latin Songs Artist of the Year	Fuerza Regida	Won	
Billboard Latin Music Awards	2024	Top Latin Album of the Year	Pa Las Baby's y Belikeada	Nominated	
Billboard Latin Music Awards	2024	Regional Mexican Album of the Year	Pa Las Baby's y Belikeada	Won	
Billboard Latin Music Awards	2024	Hot Latin Song of the Year, Vocal Event	"Harley Quinn" (with Marshmello)	Nominated	
Billboard Latin Music Awards	2024	Streaming Song of the Year	"Qué Onda" (with Calle 24 and Chino Pacas)	Nominated	
Billboard Latin Music Awards	2025	Artist of the Year	Fuerza Regida	Nominated	
Billboard Latin Music Awards	2025	Global 200 Latin Artist of the Year	Fuerza Regida	Nominated	
Billboard Latin Music Awards	2025	Hot Latin Songs Artist of the Year, Duo or Group	Fuerza Regida	Won	
Billboard Latin Music Awards	2025	Top Latin Albums Artist of the Year, Duo or Group	Fuerza Regida	Won	
Billboard Latin Music Awards	2025	Regional Mexican Artist of the Year, Duo or Group	Fuerza Regida	Won	
Billboard Latin Music Awards	2025	Global 200 Latin Song of the Year	"Tu Boda" (with Óscar Maydon)	Nominated	
Billboard Latin Music Awards	2025	Hot Latin Song of the Year	"Tu Boda" (with Óscar Maydon)	Nominated	
Billboard Latin Music Awards	2025	Hot Latin Song of the Year, Vocal Event	"Tu Boda" (with Óscar Maydon)	Won	
Billboard Latin Music Awards	2025	Streaming Song of the Year	"Tu Boda" (with Óscar Maydon)	Nominated	
Billboard Latin Music Awards	2025	Regional Mexican Song of the Year	"Tu Boda" (with Óscar Maydon)	Won	
Billboard Latin Music Awards	2025	Hot Latin Song of the Year, Vocal Event	"Me Jalo" (with Grupo Frontera)	Nominated	
Billboard Latin Music Awards	2025	Latin Airplay Song of the Year	"Me Jalo" (with Grupo Frontera)	Nominated	
Billboard Latin Music Awards	2025	Regional Mexican Song of the Year	"Me Jalo" (with Grupo Frontera)	Nominated	
Billboard Latin Music Awards	2025	Regional Mexican Song of the Year	“Por Esos Ojos”	Nominated	
Billboard Latin Music Awards	2025	Top Regional Mexican Album of the Year	111xpantía	Nominated	
Billboard Latin Music Awards	2026	Artist of the Year	Fuerza Regida	Nominated	
Billboard Latin Music Awards	2026	Global 200 Latin Artist of the Year	Fuerza Regida	Nominated	
Billboard Latin Music Awards	2026	Fan Favorite Artist	Fuerza Regida	Nominated	
Billboard Latin Music Awards	2026	Hot Latin Songs Artist of the Year, Duo or Group	Fuerza Regida	Won	
Billboard Latin Music Awards	2026	Top Latin Albums Artist of the Year, Duo or Group	Fuerza Regida	Won	
Billboard Latin Music Awards	2026	Regional Mexican Artist of the Year, Duo or Group	Fuerza Regida	Won	
Billboard Latin Music Awards	2026	Hot Latin Song of the Year, Vocal Event	"Cuando No Era Cantante (Remix)" (with El Bogueto, Yung Beef and Anuel AA)	Nominated	
Billboard Latin Music Awards	2026	Global 200 Latin Song of the Year	"Cuando No Era Cantante (Remix)" (with El Bogueto, Yung Beef and Anuel AA)	Nominated	
Billboard Latin Music Awards	2026	Global 200 Latin Song of the Year	"Marlboro Rojo"	Won	
Billboard Latin Music Awards	2026	Hot Latin Song of the Year	"Marlboro Rojo"	Won	
Billboard Latin Music Awards	2026	Regional Mexican Song of the Year	"Marlboro Rojo"	Won	
Billboard Latin Music Awards	2026	Streaming Song of the Year	"Marlboro Rojo"	Won	
Billboard Latin Music Awards	2026	Streaming Song of the Year	"Ansiedad"	Nominated	
Billboard Music Awards	2023	Top Duo/Group	Fuerza Regida	Won	
Billboard Music Awards	2023	Top Latin Artist	Fuerza Regida	Nominated	
Billboard Music Awards	2023	Top Latin Duo/Group	Fuerza Regida	Won	
Billboard Music Awards	2023	Top Latin Song	"Bebe Dame" (with Grupo Frontera)	Nominated	
Billboard Music Awards	2024	Top Duo/Group	Fuerza Regida	Won	
Billboard Music Awards	2024	Top Latin Artist	Fuerza Regida	Nominated	
Billboard Music Awards	2024	Top Latin Duo/Group	Fuerza Regida	Won	
Billboard Music Awards	2024	Top Latin Album	Pa Las Baby's y Belikeada	Nominated	
Grammy Awards	2026	Best Música Mexicana Album (including Tejano)	Mala Mía (with Grupo Frontera)	Nominated	
IHeartRadio Music Awards	2024	Regional Mexican Song of the Year	"Bebe Dame" (with Grupo Frontera)	Nominated	
IHeartRadio Music Awards	2026	Regional Mexican Artist of the Year	Fuerza Regida	Nominated	
IHeartRadio Music Awards	2026	Regional Mexican Album of the Year	111xpantía	Won	
Latin American Music Awards	2023	Favorite Regional Mexican Duo or Group	Fuerza Regida	Nominated	
Latin American Music Awards	2023	Song of the Year	"Bebe Dame" (with Grupo Frontera)	Nominated	
Latin American Music Awards	2023	Collaboration of the Year	"Bebe Dame" (with Grupo Frontera)	Nominated	
Latin American Music Awards	2023	Favorite Regional Mexican Album	Del Barrio Hasta Aquí, Vol. 2	Nominated	
Latin American Music Awards	2023	Best Collaboration – Regional Mexican	"Billete Grande (En Vivo)" (with Edgardo Nuñez)	Nominated	
Latin American Music Awards	2023	Best Collaboration – Regional Mexican	"Se Acabó (En vivo)" (with Lenin Ramírez & Banda Renovación)	Nominated	
Latin American Music Awards	2024	Artist of the Year	Fuerza Regida	Nominated	
Latin American Music Awards	2024	Streaming Artist of the Year	Fuerza Regida	Nominated	
Latin American Music Awards	2024	Global Latin Artist of the Year	Fuerza Regida	Nominated	
Latin American Music Awards	2024	Favorite Regional Mexican Duo or Group	Fuerza Regida	Nominated	
Latin American Music Awards	2024	Album of the Year	Pa Que Hablen	Nominated	
Latin American Music Awards	2024	Favorite Regional Mexican Album	Pa Las Baby's y Belikeada	Nominated	
Latin American Music Awards	2024	Favorite Regional Mexican Song	"TQM"	Won	
Latin American Music Awards	2024	Best Collaboration - Regional Mexican	"Bebe Dame" (with Grupo Frontera)	Nominated	
Latin Grammy Awards	2025	Best Regional Mexican Song	"Me Jalo" (with Grupo Frontera)	Nominated	
Lo Nuestro Awards	2020	Regional Mexican "Sierreño" Song of the Year	"Sigo Chambeando"	Nominated	
Lo Nuestro Awards	2021	Regional Mexican "Sierreño" Song of the Year	"El Muchacho Alegre"	Nominated	
Lo Nuestro Awards	2023	Regional Mexican "Sierreño" Song of the Year	"Descansando"	Nominated	
Lo Nuestro Awards	2024	Regional Mexican Group or Duo of the Year	Fuerza Regida	Nominated	
Lo Nuestro Awards	2024	Regional Mexican New Artist of the Year	Fuerza Regida	Nominated	
Lo Nuestro Awards	2024	Regional Mexican Album of the Year	Pa Que Hablen	Nominated	
Lo Nuestro Awards	2024	Regional Mexican Collaboration of the Year	"Bebe Dame" (with Grupo Frontera)	Nominated	
Lo Nuestro Awards	2024	Regional Mexican Collaboration of the Year	"Se Acabó (En Vivo)" (with Lenin Ramírez & Banda Renovación)	Nominated	
Lo Nuestro Awards	2024	Banda Song of the Year	"Se Acabó (En Vivo)" (with Lenin Ramírez & Banda Renovación)	Nominated	
Lo Nuestro Awards	2025	Artist of the Year	Fuerza Regida	Nominated	
Lo Nuestro Awards	2025	Mexican Music Group or Duo Of The Year	Fuerza Regida	Nominated	
Lo Nuestro Awards	2025	Song of the Year	"Tu Boda" (with Óscar Maydon)	Nominated	
Lo Nuestro Awards	2025	Mexican Music Song Of The Year	"Tu Boda" (with Óscar Maydon)	Nominated	
Lo Nuestro Awards	2025	Album of the Year	Pa Las Baby's y Belikeada	Nominated	
Lo Nuestro Awards	2025	Mexican Music Album Of The Year	Pa Las Baby's y Belikeada	Nominated	
Lo Nuestro Awards	2025	Mexican Music Best Electro Corrido	"Harley Quinn" (with Marshmello)	Won	
Lo Nuestro Awards	2026	Artist of the Year	Fuerza Regida	Nominated	
Lo Nuestro Awards	2026	Mexican Music Group or Duo of the Year	Fuerza Regida	Nominated	
Lo Nuestro Awards	2026	Song of the Year	"Me Jalo" (with Grupo Frontera)	Nominated	
Lo Nuestro Awards	2026	Mexican Music Collaboration of the Year	"Me Jalo" (with Grupo Frontera)	Nominated	
Lo Nuestro Awards	2026	Album of the Year	111xpantia	Nominated	
Lo Nuestro Awards	2026	Mexican Music Album of the Year	111xpantia	Nominated	
Lo Nuestro Awards	2026	Mexican Music Song of the Year	"Por Esos Ojos"	Nominated	
Lo Nuestro Awards	2026	Mexican Music Fusion of the Year	"Marlboro Rojo"	Nominated	
MTV Millennial Awards	2024	MIAW Artist	Fuerza Regida	Nominated	
MTV Millennial Awards	2024	Regional Artist	Fuerza Regida	Nominated	
MTV Millennial Awards	2024	Viral Anthem	"Harley Quinn" (with Marshmello)	Nominated	
MTV Millennial Awards	2024	Video of the Year	"El Jefe" (with Shakira)	Nominated	
MTV Video Music Awards	2025	Best Group	Fuerza Regida	Nominated	
MTV Video Music Awards	2026	Best Group	Fuerza Regida	Nominated	
MTV Video Music Awards	2026	Best Latin	"Tu Sancho"	Nominated	
Premios Juventud	2019	Best New Regional Mexican Artist	Fuerza Regida	Nominated	
Premios Juventud	2022	Regional Mexican Album of the Year	Del Barrio Hasta Aquí, Vol. 2	Nominated	
Premios Juventud	2023	Favorite Group or Duo of The Year	Fuerza Regida	Nominated	
Premios Juventud	2023	Male Artist – On The Rise	Fuerza Regida	Nominated	
Premios Juventud	2023	My Favorite Streaming Artist	Fuerza Regida	Nominated	
Premios Juventud	2023	Best Regional Mexican Collaboration	"Bebe Dame" (with Grupo Frontera)	Nominated	
Premios Juventud	2023	Best Regional Mexican Collaboration	"Se Acabó (En Vivo)" (with Lenin Ramírez & Banda Renovación)	Nominated	
Premios Juventud	2024	Favorite Group or Duo of The Year	Fuerza Regida	Won	
Premios Juventud	2024	The Perfect Mix	"El Jefe" (with Shakira)	Nominated	
Premios Juventud	2024	Best Regional Mexican Collaboration	"Santo Patrón" (with Banda MS de Sergio Lizárraga)	Nominated	
Premios Juventud	2024	Best Regional Mexican Album	Pa Las Baby's y Belikeada	Nominated	
Premios Juventud	2025	Favorite Group or Duo of The Year	Fuerza Regida	Nominated	
Premios Juventud	2025	Best Mexican Music Fusion	"Tu Boda" (with Óscar Maydon)	Nominated	
Premios Juventud	2025	Best Alternative Mexican Music	"Como Capo" (with Clave Especial)	Won	
Premios Juventud	2025	Best Mexican Music Album	Pero No Te Enamores	Nominated	
Premios Juventud	2026	Best Mexican Music Fusion	"Marlboro Rojo"	Nominated	
Premios Juventud	2026	Best Mexican Band Song	"Seguro Le Dolió" (with Banda Ms De Sergio Lizárraga)	Nominated	
Premios Juventud	2026	Best Mexican Music Album	111xpantia (Deluxe)	Nominated	
Premios Tu Música Urbano	2023	Top Artist — Regional Mexican Urban	Fuerza Regida	Nominated	
Premios Tu Música Urbano	2025	Top Artist — Regional Mexican Urban	Fuerza Regida	Nominated	
Premios Tu Música Urbano	2025	Top Song — Regional	"Tu Boda" (with Óscar Maydon)	Nominated	
Premios Tu Música Urbano	2026	Top Artist — Regional Mexican Urban	Fuerza Regida	Nominated	
Premios Tu Música Urbano	2026	Remix of the Year	"Cuando No Era Cantante (Remix)" (with El Bogueto, Yung Beef and Anuel AA)	Won	
Premios Tu Música Urbano	2026	Top Song — Regional	"Marlboro Rojo"	Nominated	
