= Pero No Te Enamores =

Studio album by Fuerza Regida
- Released: July 25, 2024
- Genres: EDM; Regional Mexican; reggaeton
- Length: 39:11
- Language: Spanish
- Labels: Sony Music Latin; Street Mob; Rancho Humilde
- Producers: Afrojack; Alok; Bass; Charly; Gordo; Gore Ocean; Gray Hawken; Hitgirl; Kaaj; Jesús Ortíz Paz; Major Lazer; Miguel Armenta; Moises López; Nico Baran; Rabba; Synthetic; Twenty9; Vendr; Yuzu

Fuerza Regida chronology
Dolido Pero No Arrepentido (2024)	Pero No Te Enamores (2024)	Mala Mía (2024)

Singles from Pero No Te Enamores
- 1. "Nel" Released: August 9, 2024; 2. "Secreto Victoria" Released: August 16, 2024; 3. "Pero No Te Enamores" Released: August 30, 2024; 4. "Fresita" Released: October 25, 2024

Pero No Te Enamores (transl. But Don't Fall in Love) is the eighth studio album by American regional Mexican band Fuerza Regida. It was released on July 25, 2024, by Sony Music Latin, Street Mob and Rancho Humilde. Primarily a regional Mexican and EDM record, production was handled by prominent producers Afrojack, Alok, Gordo and Major Lazer, who are also credited as featured artists on the album alongside Maluma and Bellakath.

== Background and marketing ==
After the band released their sixth studio album, Pa Las Baby's y Belikeada (2023), and the surprise EP Dolido Pero No Arrepentido (2024), they announced that they would embark the Pero No Te Enamores tour. They announced Pero No Te Enamores on July 16, 2024, and it was simultaneously promoted with murals that appeared in major cities, including the band's city of establishment, San Bernardino, California. The murals depicted a painting of a crossed-out heart, with the album's release date and a Parental Advisory logo. Explaining their marketing strategy in an interview with Billboard, they stated that the album's concept is about "[not] fall[ing] in love" and was "the album [they've] invested the most money on". Its track list was also revealed on July 22, 2024.

== Composition ==
Pero No Te Enamores has been described as a regional Mexican and EDM record, containing musical fusions of bachata, hip hop, house, Jersey club, and reggaeton. During a June 2024 listening party, lead vocalist Jesús Ortíz Paz stated that the album was inspired by the band's hit single "Harley Quinn" with Marshmello, in which they coined as a "jersey corrido." He also stated that Canadian singer Drake's album Honestly, Nevermind (2022) was an inspiration for the album, which led him to creating such album.

== Commercial performance ==
Pero No Te Enamores debuted at number 25 on the US Billboard 200 with 23,000 album-equivalent units, making it their fifth entry on the chart. Additionally, it debuted at number two on the US Top Latin Albums chart, making it their seventh album to debut within the top 10.

== Track listing ==
Pero No Te Enamores track listing
No.	Title	Producer(s)	Length
1.	"Tuqlo"	Bass; Kaaj; Jesús Ortíz Paz; Nico Baran; Synthetic; Vendr	2:03
2.	"Nel"	Miguel Armenta; Ortíz Paz; Twenty9	2:29
3.	"Sofia" (with Major Lazer and Alok)	Alok; Gordo; Major Lazer; Ortíz Paz	2:53
4.	"Kylie"	Gordo; Ortíz Paz	2:31
5.	"Bella"	Charly; Gordo; Ortíz Paz; Rabba	3:02
6.	"Fvck" (with Afrojack)	Afrojack; Bass; Gray Hawken; Hitgirl; Kaaj; Ortíz Paz; Synthetic; Vendr; Yuzu	3:06
7.	"Valeria" (with Maluma and Gordo)	Gordo; Ortíz Paz	2:34
8.	"Secreto Victoria"	Charly; Ortíz Paz; Rabba; Twenty9	2:33
9.	"Britney"	Miguel Armenta; Ortíz Paz; Twenty9	2:40
10.	"Ale"	Gordo; Ortíz Paz	1:47
11.	"Fresita" (with Bellakath)	Bass; Kaaj; Ortíz Paz; Synthetic	2:23
12.	"Freestyle"	Gore Ocean; Ortíz Paz	2:17
13.	"Jesús"	Moises López; Ortíz Paz	2:56
14.	"Belinda"	López; Ortíz Paz	2:53
15.	"Pero No Te Enamores"	Charly; Ortíz Paz; Rabba	3:04
Total length:			39:11

Notes

- "Tuqlo" is pronounced as "tu culo", which translates to "your ass" in English.

== Charts ==
Chart performance for Pero No Te Enamores
Chart (2024)	Peak position
US Billboard 200	25
US Top Latin Albums (Billboard)	2

== Certifications ==
Certifications for Pero No Te Enamores
Region	Certification	Certified units/sales
Mexico (AMPROFON)	2× Platinum+Gold	350,000^{‡}
United States (RIAA)	2× Platinum (Latin)	120,000^{‡}
^{‡} Sales+streaming figures based on certification alone.
