= Clave Especial =

Regional Mexican band

- Origin: Salinas, California, U.S.
- Genres: Regional Mexican; corridos tumbados
- Years active: 2021–present
- Labels: Street Mob; Warner Latina
- Members: Alejandro Ahumada; Leonardo Lomeli; Rogelio Gonzalez

Clave Especial is an American regional Mexican band from Salinas, California. The band was founded in 2021 by cousins Alejandro Ahumada (lead vocals) and Leonardo Lomeli (lead guitar), who were later joined by Rogelio Gonzalez. After signing with Street Mob Records, they gained recognition with the release of their 2023 single, "Rápido Soy", and are known for collaborations such as "NO PASA NADA" and "Como Capo", both with Fuerza Regida, as well as "No Son Doritos" with Luis R. Conriquez.

According to Billboard, the band "stands out for [its] unique blend of traditional and modern sounds", performing "hard-hitting corrido hits" with urban influences and introspective lyrics.

== History ==
=== Formation ===
The band members, all three of whom are college graduates, were born in Salinas, California, to Mexican immigrant parents who worked as farmworkers. They grew up listening to Regional Mexican genres such as corridos, norteño, and banda, and formed Clave Especial in 2021. That year, the band put out its first release, a live album called En Clave, Vol. 1 (En Vivo), which featured a popular song called "El Tranki". Over the next two years, they released two more live albums as well as an extended play called Los Archivados.

=== Breakthrough ===
In late 2023, Clave Especial was signed to Jesús Ortíz Paz's label, Street Mob Records. They released "Rápido Soy" soon afterwards, which amassed 179 million streams on Spotify in 2023 and became their breakout single. As of 2025, the music video has racked up over 80 million views on YouTube. In 2024, Clave Especial joined the Warner Music Latina roster when Warner partnered with Street Mob. Accordingly, the band joined fellow labelmates Calle 24 and Chino Pacas as co-headliners on the Street Mob Tour later that year, performing in several shows throughout the Southwestern United States.

Clave Especial received further attention with the release of "Kalashnikov" in January 2024, which amassed over 156 million Spotify streams that year. That June, they performed the song while walking boxer David Benavidez to the ring prior to his interim world title defense against Oleksandr Gvozdyk at the MGM Grand Garden Arena. EssentiallySports noted that the song "mirrors his aggressive fighting style and builds anticipation for what’s to come", while adding that the band's performance "[added] a powerful, energetic vibe" to Benavidez's entrance. In August 2024, Clave Especial collaborated with Luis R. Conriquez on the single "No Son Doritos", which garnered over 163 millions streams on Spotify in 2024 and whose accompanying music video has accumulated over 100 million views on YouTube as of 2025. In September 2024, Clave Especial performed at Festival ARRE in Mexico City, the largest festival for regional Mexican music in the country. Later that month, they released the single "GPI" with Chino Pacas along with a music video. In October 2024, Clave Especial and Fuerza Regida co-released "NO PASA NADA", along with an accompanying music video. Despite its late release in the year, it accumulated over 127 million streams on Spotify in the remaining months of 2024. In November, Clave Especial performed at the inaugural Don't Fall in Love Fest in San Bernardino, California, headlined by Fuerza Regida, Lil Baby, and Los Ángeles Azules. In January 2025, Clave Especial was named one of four "Artists To Watch" in the Latin music category by Spotify alongside De La Rose, Netón Vega, and Yan Block.

=== Debut album ===
On February 20, 2025, Clave Especial released their debut studio album, MIJA NO TE ASUSTES, featuring appearances from Fuerza Regida, Luis R. Conriquez, Los Dareyes de la Sierra, Calle 24, and Edgardo Nuñez. It charted on the US Billboard 200 for 17 weeks, peaking at number 91, and was later certified platinum in the Latin field by the Recording Industry Association of America (RIAA). The album also received a 3.5-star rating from AllMusic. Aside from previously released singles, the album spawned an additional hit song in "COMO CAPO", a collaboration with Fuerza Regida, for which an accompanying music video was also released. In April 2025, Clave Especial returned to their hometown of Salinas for a sold-out show at the historic Fox Theatre, which included surprise appearances from Jesús Ortíz Paz and Chuyín. In June 2025, the band performed at Festival La Onda in Napa, California. Later that month, Clave Especial announced the MIJA NO TE ASUSTES Tour, a 17-date national tour from September to November with a final show at the Hollywood Palladium. The band was then scheduled to perform at the Michelada Fest in the Chicago area in July, though the event was cancelled due to "uncertainty surrounding artist visas and the rapidly changing political climate" under the Donald Trump administration. In June 2025, Clave Especial joined Fuerza Regida on-stage to perform "COMO CAPO" during a sold-out show at the Hollywood Bowl.

== Discography ==
=== Studio albums ===
List of studio albums, with selected details, chart positions, and certifications
Title	Details	Peak chart positions			Certifications
Title	Details	US	US Latin	US Reg. Mex.	Certifications
Mija No Te Asustes	Released: February 20, 2025; Label: Street Mob, Warner Latina; Format: Digital download, streaming	91	8	5	RIAA: Platinum (Latin)
"—" denotes a recording that did not chart or was not released in that territory.

=== Collaborative albums ===
- Corridos Arremangados: Primera Edición (with Alta Autoridad and Los de Porte Fino) (2023)

=== EPs ===
- Las Archivadas (2023)
- AfterAfter (2026)

=== Live albums ===
- En Clave, Vol. 1 (En Vivo) (2021)
- Al Topon, Vol. 1 (En Vivo) (2022)
- En Clave, Vol. 2 (En Vivo) (2022)

=== Singles ===
List of singles, with selected chart positions, and album name
Title	Year	Peak		Certifications	Album
Title	Year	US	US Latin	Certifications	Album
"Rápido Soy"	2023	—	39	RIAA: 13× Platinum (Latin)	Mija No Te Asustes
"Corta Edad"	2023	—	—	RIAA: 3× Platinum (Latin)	Non-album singles
"Kalashnikov"	2024	—	36	RIAA: 9× Platinum (Latin)	Mija No Te Asustes
"Tesla"	2024	—	—	RIAA: 3× Platinum (Latin)	Non-album singles
"Tu Coquette" (with Los Dareyes de la Sierra)	2024	—	—	RIAA: 4× Platinum (Latin)	Mija No Te Asustes
"Voy Enfierrado"	2024	—	—	RIAA: 3× Platinum (Latin)	Non-album singles
"No Son Doritos" (with Luis R. Conriquez)	2024	—	14	RIAA: Diamond (Latin)	Mija No Te Asustes
"GPI" (with Chino Pacas)	2024	—	—		Non-album singles
"No Pasa Nada" (with Fuerza Regida)	2024	—	16	RIAA: 4× Platinum (Latin)	Mija No Te Asustes
"Ferrari" (with Los Gemelos de Sinaloa and Fuerza Regida)	2026	83	6		AfterAfter
"—" denotes a recording that did not chart or was not released in that territory.

=== Other charted songs ===
List of other charted songs, with selected chart positions, certifications and album name
Title	Year	Peak chart positions				Certifications	Album
Title	Year	US Latin	US Reg. Mex	MEX	WW	Certifications	Album
"Como Capo" (with Fuerza Regida)	2025	25	11	8	127		Mija No Te Asustes
"Tú Tú Tú" (with Edgardo Núñez)	2025	13	6	6	92	RIAA: Diamond (Latin)	Mija No Te Asustes
"—" denotes a recording that did not chart or was not released in that territory.

== Tours ==
- MIJA NO TE ASUSTES Tour (2025)
