= Tololoche =

Traditional musical instrument of southern Mexico

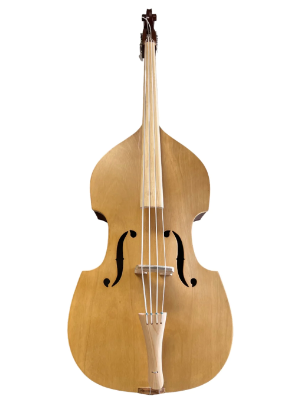
Traditional tololoche

The tololoche is a traditional musical instrument from southern Mexico. Its name comes from "tolo loch", from the Mayan language: tolo (bull) and loch (embraced), which would later become tololoche. It is a variant of the European double bass, though sightly smaller, and is still large enough to produce low-pitched sounds. It has three or four strings, and is plucked with the fingers (pizzicato). It is purely a folk instrument, and not used in classical music.

In northern Mexico it is used in fara fara and norteño music. These styles include the button accordion, snare drum, tololoche, alto saxophone, acoustic guitar or bajo sexto. It is used by musicians playing in bars and taverns in northern cities, and is also used by university student musicians in Guanajuato playing traditional songs for callejoneadas. The tololoche became established in the north of Mexico as indispensable to the interpretation of regional music and less awkward than the classical double-bass to transport.

The instrument is purely acoustic, and its role has gradually been replaced by electric instruments such as the electric bass. In the 1950s, modern instruments such as the drum set and the electric bass began to take the place of the tambor de rancho and tololoche, respectively. However, musicians and composers have returned to the tololoche for consistency within the field of traditional music.

== Etymology ==
Cecilio Agustín Robelo, a Mexican philologist from the beginning of the 19th century, was one of the first to be interested in the origin of this name, and had published the results of his research in his "Diccionario De Aztequismos" (Dictionary of Aztequisms). In this book, he defines the tololoche as “Name that the Indians gave to the musical instrument called « Contrabass » when they saw its rounded shapes, and that it looked like an irregular spheroid". (Note: (Tololo Tic: redondo, esférico) Nombre que dieron los indios al instrumento músico llamado « Contrabajo » cuando vieran sus formas redondas, y que era semejante a un esféroide irregular) He considered that this name derived from the words, in the Nahuatl language, “Tololo Tic”, which he interpreted as “round or spherical”.

Cecilio Agustín Robelo's explanation is difficult to impose, because from that time on, botanists used the word "tololonchi" to designate the spherical fruits of various species of Passiflora bryonioides, a variety of Passifloras that grows in Mexican states of Sonora, Chihuahua, Sinaloa and Guanajuato, as well as in the American state of Arizona.

== Terminology ==
It is also called chicote because one playing technique produces a whip-like sound. Some players play the chicote note along with two strokes of the palms to produce a drum beat, while others prefer to strike the body as one would the cajón of Peru, creating percussive rhythms when there is no drum available.

== Construction ==
The neck of a tololoche is usually made of pine and the body of caobilla, unlike the viol. The four-string tuning is A-D-G-C (La-Re-Sol-Do), a fourth higher than the standard double bass. Strings were traditionally made of gut, giving way to nylon and steel-wrapped nylon.

== Sources ==
- (es) Robelo, Cecilio Agustin (1904). Diccionario De Aztequismos, Ó Sea Catálogo De Las Palabras Del Idioma Nahuatl, Azteca Ó Mexicano, Introducidas Al Idioma Castellano Bajo Diversas Formas (PDF). Self-publishing.

== Notes and references ==
Notes
