= Corridos tumbados =

Mexican music subgenre

- Other names: Corridos bélicos; trap corridos
- Stylistic origins: Corrido; narcocorrido; Latin hip hop; reggaeton; urbano; Latin trap
- Cultural origins: Mexico and United States

Corridos tumbados (Spanish pronunciation: [koˈriðos tumˈbaðos]), also known as trap corridos, is a subgenre of regional Mexican music, specifically of a corrido, with musical elements of a narcocorrido and rap music. Its style originated in the late 2010s, later popularized by Mexican musician Natanael Cano.

The subgenre later received international recognition through songs released by Mexican musician Peso Pluma, as well as other artists such as Junior H, Gabito Ballesteros, and Fuerza Regida.

== Origins ==
Corridos tumbados emerged in northwestern Mexico and the southwestern United States, particularly in Sinaloa, Sonora, and Jalisco, as well as among Mexican-American communities in the United States. While drawing from the narrative tradition of classic corridos, the genre's sound is modernized by integrating urban beats, trap flows, and auto-tuned vocals.

The genre name was first popularized by Natanael Cano, who released his 2019 breakout album titled Corridos Tumbados, effectively branding the hybrid style and giving the genre its namesake. The term “tumbado” can roughly translate to “laid-back”. However, in a broader musical sense, “tumbado” operates similarly to the term alternative in genres like rock or R&B, signaling a departure from traditional styles in favor of experimental or unconventional driven variations.

A pivotal institution in the genre’s rise was Rancho Humilde, an independent Los Angeles-based record label founded by Jimmy Humilde. The label signed artists such as Cano, Fuerza Regida, Junior H, and Ovi, and helped craft a sound and image that blended corridos with trap-era aesthetics. Rancho Humilde also played a central role in promoting corridos tumbados through digital platforms and social media, enabling the genre to grow virally.

=== Influences ===
Traditional Corridos – Especially in the use of the traditional Norteño music instruments, like the acoustic guitar "requinto" style, the electric bass, and especially the Tololoche, a traditional Mexican instrument similar to the Double Bass, but smaller and generally tuned higher. Corridos Sierreños, a sub-genre of the mid-2010s, and made popular by artists like Ariel Camacho, created the instrumental template for corridos tumbados, especially in the use of the requinto style.

Narcocorridos – Corridos that narrate the lives of drug traffickers or cartel figures, heavily influencing lyrical themes, and has become synonymous with the tumbados genre, with most songs exclusively making reference to the narco world.

Banda music - A brass-based genre popular in Sinaloa and Sonora, which inspired the use of instruments like the tuba, trombone and the alto horn (known as the "charcheta" in Mexico) in the genre.

Trap and Hip-Hop – Beats, flows, and themes borrowed from street rap and trap, including motifs of hustle, fame, and violence.

Reggaeton and Latin Urban – Melodic hooks and crossover rhythm structures.

== Popularity ==
As of 2025, corridos tumbados dominate on digital streaming sites like Spotify. Peso Pluma leads the genre with 42.9 million monthly listeners on Spotify, placing him among the top Latin artists globally. Other top artists who make corridos tumbados include Fuerza Regida who maintains over 32.6 million monthly listeners and Natanael Cano with 23.2 million monthly listeners.

The genre commands over 77% of all Música Mexicana streams on Spotify, with curated playlists and viral hits consistently trending on the platform. On YouTube, artists like Peso Pluma regularly reach over 100 million views per video with songs like "La Bebe" with 1 billion views and “Ella Baila Sola” with over 800 million views.

== Controversies ==
=== Cartel Affiliation ===
Many corridos tumbados feature lyrics that reference real-life figures in organized crime, including tributes, eulogies, or glorification of cartel leaders. Most songs come at the personal request of those involved in the narco world, especially seeing as how writing songs that reference high-profile individuals without their permission is prohibited in the narco world, and could come with ramifications if done so. Because of this, many artists are seen as the propaganda arm of the cartel world, with government officials and critics labeling the artists, along with the genre, as "apología del delito" or vindication or promotion of crime.

=== Threats ===
The content has made some artists the target of cartel threats:

Peso Pluma was threatened by the Jalisco New Generation Cartel (CJNG) in 2023 for lyrics referencing Joaquín “El Chapo” Guzmán, his sons, and the Sinaloa Cartel. A concert in Tijuana was canceled after narcomantas (threat banners) were displayed.

In 2025, Peso Pluma reportedly received further threats, this time allegedly from La Mayiza, a Sinaloa Cartel faction loyal to Ismael "El Mayo" Zambada. The threats emerged amid a violent conflict with the rival Los Chapitos faction, led by the sons of Joaquín "El Chapo" Guzmán, following Zambada's July 2024 arrest, which his supporters attributing a betrayal by Joaquín Guzmán López. Leaflets distributed over Culiacán accused Peso Pluma and other public figures of having ties to Los Chapitos, noting the references to El Chapo and Los Chapitos in his songs. This has prompted speculation that the latest threats contributed to his absence from Mexican concerts since September 2024. However, Peso Pluma has not publicly confirmed any connection between the threats and why he hasn't performed in Mexico since then.

Fuerza Regida received similar threats and warnings from CJNG-affiliated sources for similar reasons, leading to security concerns and an event cancellation also in the city of Tijuana.

=== Bans and Censorship ===
==== In Mexico ====
Recently, multiple Mexican states have implemented bans or restrictions on the performance of corridos that glorify organized crime, with 10 (out of 32) states in Mexico banning the music. These states include Baja California, Chihuahua, Guanajuato, Quintana Roo, Nayarit, Jalisco, Michoacán, Aguascalientes, Querétaro, and the Estado de México.

In Texcoco, State of Mexico, singer Luis R. Conriquez was prohibited from singing narcocorridos during the 2025 Feria del Caballo. His refusal to perform these songs led to violent backlash from the audience, who rioted and forced the band to flee the stage.

In their study of the Mexican government's attempts to ban narcocorridos, scholars César Jesús Burgos Dávila, David Moreno Candil, Helena Simonett argue that state "censorship of narcocorridos criminalizes artistic expressions as a preventive strategy to combat criminal activities related to drug trafficking" has not decreased the genre's appeal to fans on both sides of the border, but instead forced young artists to be more creative and subversive in their strategies to reach their audiences.

==== U.S. Visa Revocations ====
After Mexican band Los Alegres del Barranco, a traditional narcocorridos group, projected an image of former CJNG leader Nemesio "El Mencho" Oseguera during a concert in Jalisco, the U.S. State Department revoked their visas in 2025. Deputy Secretary of State Christopher Landau condemned the act and announced that the United States would not welcome performers "who extol criminals and terrorists".

This move marked the beginning of a broader policy aimed at scrutinizing all artists associated with cartel-linked themes, including many corridos tumbados performers based in Mexico. Reports have since surfaced of increased visa denials and travel restrictions for Mexican artists whose lyrics or visuals could be interpreted as promoting or legitimizing criminal elements.

==== Other International Bans ====
In Chile, artists such as Peso Pluma have faced mounting pressure from politicians seeking to ban performances that glorify cartel culture—pressure that ultimately led to his withdrawal from the 2024 Viña del Mar International Song Festival.
