= 2025 in Latin music =

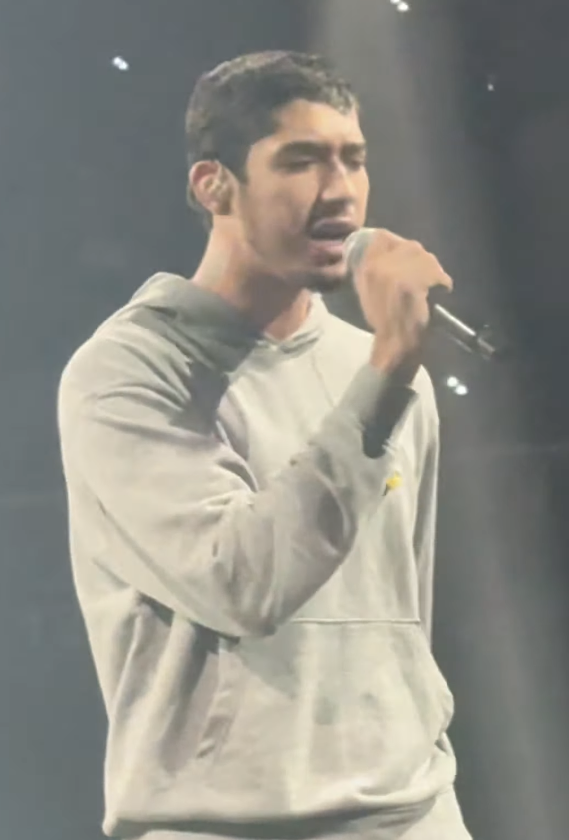
Mexican singer Netón Vega was recognized as Top New Latin Artist of the Year by Billboard.

The following is a list of events and new Spanish and Portuguese language music that happened in 2025 in Ibero-America. Ibero-America encompasses Latin America, Spain, Portugal, and the Latino population in Canada and the United States.

== Events ==
=== January–March ===
- February 1 – "Esa diva", written by Alberto Fuentes Lorite and Melodía Ruiz Gutiérrez, and performed by Melody, wins the fourth edition of the Benidorm Fest, and would represent Spain in the Eurovision Song Contest 2025, held in Basel, Switzerland.
- February 2 – The 67th Annual Grammy Awards are held at the Crypto.com Arena in Los Angeles.
  - Las Mujeres Ya No Lloran by Shakira wins Best Latin Pop Album.
  - Las Letras Ya No Importan by Residente wins Best Música Urbana Album.
  - ¿Quién Trae las Cornetas? by Rawayana for Best Latin Rock or Alternative Album.
  - Boca Chueca, Vol. 1 by Carín León wins Best Música Mexicana Album (including Tejano).
  - Alma, Corazón y Salsa (Live at Gran Teatro Nacional) by Tony Succar and Mimy Succar wins Best Tropical Latin Album.
  - Cubop Live! by Luques Curtis, Zaccai Curtis, Willie Martinez, Camilo Molina and Reinaldo de Jesus wins Best Latin Jazz Album.
  - "Bemba Colorá" by Sheila E. featuring Gloria Estefan and Mimy Succar wins Best Global Music Performance
  - Gustavo Dudamel wins both Best Orchestral Performance and Best Classical Compendium as conductor of "Ortiz: Revolución Diamantina".
  - Gabriela Ortiz wins Best Contemporary Classical Composition as composer of "Ortiz: Revolución Diamantina".
- February 8 – At the 39th Goya Awards, held at the Granada Conference & Exhibition Centre in Granada, Spain to recognize the best in Spanish cinema, Alberto Iglesias wins Best Original Score for The Room Next Door, while Antón Álvarez (C. Tangana) and Yerai Cortés win Best Original Song for the song "Los Almendros" from the film The Flamenco Guitar of Yerai Cortés. The film, which covers the career of Cortés, also wins Best Documentary.
- February 20 – The 37th Lo Nuestro Awards are held at Kaseya Center in Miami, Florida.
  - Karol G wins Artist of the Year.
  - Las Mujeres Ya No Lloran by Shakira wins Album of the Year.
  - "Si Antes Te Hubiera Conocido" by Karol G wins Song of the Year.
- February 23–March 1 – The 64th edition of the Viña del Mar International Song Festival is held. Performers include Myriam Hernández, Kidd Voodoo, Carín León, Eladio Carrión, Duki, Ha*Ash, and Marc Anthony, among others.
- March 8 – "Deslocado", written by André Santos, Diogo Góis, Francisco Sousa, João Guilherme Gomes, João Lourenço Gomes, and João Rodrigues, and performed by Napa, wins the 57th edition of the Festival da Canção, and would represent Portugal in the Eurovision Song Contest 2025, held in Basel, Switzerland.
- March 17 – At the 2025 iHeartRadio Music Awards, held at the Dolby Theatre in Los Angeles, Bad Bunny, Feid, Kapo, Grupo Frontera, Carín León, Peso Pluma, Shakira, and Xavi win awards in the Latin categories.
- March 29 – At the Billboard Women in Music, Ángela Aguilar receives the Breakthrough Artist award.

=== April–June ===
- April 12 — Billboard launches four new subcharts of the Hot Latin Songs chart: Hot Latin Pop Songs, Hot Regional Mexican Songs, and Hot Tropical Songs.
- April 13–April 20 – The Marías, Gustavo Dudamel, Los Mirlos, El Malilla, Judeline, Ca7riel & Paco Amoroso, Rawayana, Arca, Iván Cornejo, Alok, and Vintage Culture perform at Coachella 2025.
- April 24 – The 14th Premios Nuestra Tierra are held at the Teatro Mayor Julio Mario Santo Domingo in Bogotá to reward the best in Colombian music.
  - Shakira wins Best Global Artist.
  - "Si Antes Te Hubiera Conocido" by Karol G wins Best Global Song.
  - Calidosa by Mike Bahía wins Album of the Year.
- April 24 – At the Billboard Latin Women in Music, Selena Gomez, Celia Cruz, Olga Tañón, Anitta, Chiquis Rivera, Natti Natasha, Ha*Ash, and Belinda receive awards.
- May 17 – Spain places twenty-fourth at the 69th edition of the Eurovision Song Contest. Portugal ends twenty-first.
- May 26 – At the 51st American Music Awards, held at Fontainebleau Las Vegas in Las Vegas, Bad Bunny, Becky G, Julión Álvarez, and Shakira win in the Latin categories.
- June 4 – The 2nd Premios de la Academia de Música are held at IFEMA Palacio Municipal in Madrid, to recognize the best in Spanish music.
  - Rozalén wins Artist of the Year.
  - La Jauría by Dani Fernández wins Album of the Year.
  - "Tengo un Pensamiento" by Amaia wins Song of the Year.
  - Alcalá Norte wins Best New Artist.
- June 4 – The 32nd Brazilian Music Awards are held at the Theatro Municipal in Rio de Janeiro. Singers João Bosco, Liniker, Black Pantera, Valesca Popozuda, Emicida, Zeca Pagodinho, João Gomes, Alceu Valença, and Hermeto Pascoal are among the winners.
- June 9 – At the 14th Libera Awards, recognizing the best in independent music in the United States, Reyna Tropical wins the Best Latin Record award for Malegría.
- June 18 – The 27th Annual Premios Gardel are held at Movistar Arena in Buenos Aires, to recognize the best in Argentine music.
  - Baño María by Ca7riel & Paco Amoroso wins Album of the Year.
  - "Fanático" by Lali wins Song of the Year.
  - "Real Gangsta Love" by Trueno wins Record of the Year.
  - Olivia Wald wins Best New Artist.

=== July–September ===
- July 6 – The 11th Premios Pulsar are held in Santiago, Chile, to recognize the best in Chilean music.
  - Vida by Ana Tijoux wins Album of the Year.
  - "Bolero Libra" by Gepe and Mon Laferte wins Song of the Year.
  - La Combo Tortuga wins Artist of the Year.
  - Manul wins Best New Artist.
- September 7 – At the 2025 MTV Video Music Awards, held at the UBS Arena in Elmont, New York, Shakira wins Best Latin for "Soltera". In other categories, Bad Bunny was nominated for Artist of the Year and Best Album, while Fuerza Regida and Grupo Frontera were nominated for Best Group.
- September 23 – The Prêmio Jovem Brasileiro 2025 are held at AquaRio in Rio de Janeiro, Brazil. Simone Mendes, Zé Felipe, Henrique & Juliano, and Maiara & Maraisa are among the winners.
- September 25 – The 22nd Premios Juventud are held at the Figali Convention Center in Fort Amador, Panama.
  - Karol G wins Artist of the Year.
  - Morat wins Favorite Group or Duo of The Year
  - De La Rose and Roa win The New Generation – Female and The New Generation – Male, respectively.

=== October–December ===
- October 23 – The 32nd Billboard Latin Music Awards are held at James L. Knight Center. Bad Bunny received the most awards with eleven out of twenty-eight nominations. Special awards were presented to Elvis Crespo (Hall of Fame Award), Laura Pausini (Icon Award), Peso Pluma (Vanguard Award), and Bad Bunny (Latin Artist of the 21st Century Award).
- October 30 – At the 2025 UK Music Video Awards, held at Magazine London in London, artists Bad Bunny, Dillom, Isabella Lovestory and Guitarricadelafuente received nominations for their music videos.
- November 13 — The 26th Annual Latin Grammy Awards are held at the MGM Grand Garden Arena:
  - "Palmeras en el Jardín" by Alejandro Sanz wins Record of the Year
  - Debí Tirar Más Fotos by Bad Bunny wins Album of the Year
  - "Si Antes Te Hubiera Conocido" by Édgar Barrera, Andrés Jael Correa Rios, and Karol G wins Song of the Year
  - Paloma Morphy wins Best New Artist

== Spanish- and Portuguese-language songs on the Billboard Global 200 ==
The Billboard Global 200 is a weekly record chart published by Billboard magazine that ranks the top songs globally based on digital sales and online streaming from over 200 territories worldwide.

An asterisk (*) represents that a single is charting for the current week.

Song	Performer(s)	Entry	Peak	Weeks	Ref.
2020 entries
"Feliz Navidad"	José Feliciano	November 28, 2020	5	38	
2021 entries
"Tiroteo"	Marc Seguí, Pol Granch & Rauw Alejandro	July 17, 2021	63	20	
2022 entries
"La Canción"	J Balvin & Bad Bunny	February 12, 2022	15	49	
"Tití Me Preguntó"	Bad Bunny	May 21, 2022	4	98	
2023 entries
"Danza Kuduro"	Don Omar & Lucenzo	June 3, 2023	75	74*	
"El Amor de Su Vida"	Grupo Frontera & Grupo Firme	August 19, 2023	38	47	
"Luna"	Feid & ATL Jacob	December 23, 2023	12	74	
2024 entries
"Gata Only"	FloyyMenor X Cris MJ	February 24, 2024	4	110	
"Si No Quieres No"	Luis R Conríquez x Netón Vega	April 27, 2024	34	33	
"Si No Es Contigo"	Cris Mj	June 8, 2024	37	49	
"Si Antes Te Hubiera Conocido"	Karol G	July 6, 2024	5	123*	
"La Patrulla"	Peso Pluma & Netón Vega	July 6, 2024	34	30	
"Mírame"	Blessd & Ovy on the Drums	July 13, 2024	58	26	
"Dos Días"	Tito Double P & Peso Pluma	September 14, 2024	28	35	
"El Lokerón"	Tito Double P	September 21, 2024	27	24	
"Escápate"	Tito Double P & Chino Pacas	September 21, 2024	55	16	
"Tu Boda"	Óscar Maydon & Fuerza Regida	October 12, 2024	4	40	
"Barbie"	DJ Glenner & MC Tuto	November 9, 2024	55	7	
"Presidente"	Gabito Ballesteros, Natanael Cano, Netón Vega & Luis R. Conríquez	November 9, 2024	48	22	
"Degenere"	Myke Towers	November 9, 2024	73	13	
"Qué Pasaría..."	Rauw Alejandro & Bad Bunny	November 30, 2024	20	59	
"Khé?"	Rauw Alejandro & Romeo Santos	November 30, 2024	28	27	
"Nadie"	Tito Double P	December 7, 2024	41	24	
"El Clúb"	Bad Bunny	December 21, 2024	15	12	
"Rosones"	Tito Double P	December 21, 2024	34	21	
"Gervonta"	Peso Pluma	December 21, 2024	127	6	
"Última Noite"	Léo Foguete	December 28, 2024	71	6	
2025 entries
"Loco"	Netón Vega	January 11, 2025	24	25	
"Oh Garota Eu Quero Você Só Pra Mim"	Oruam, Zé Felipe & MC Tuto feat. DJ LC da Roca, MC K9, MC Rodrigo do CN & MC PL Alves	January 11, 2025	59	4	
"Pitorro de Coco"	Bad Bunny	January 11, 2025	33	5	
"Descer Pra BC"	Brenno & Matheus & DJ Ari SL	January 11, 2025	109	1	
"Capaz"	Alleh & Yorghaki	January 11, 2025	56	39	
"Me Jalo"	Fuerza Regida & Grupo Frontera	January 11, 2025	38	28	
"Fui Mlk"	Nilo, MC Paiva DJ Di Marques & Kyo	January 11, 2025	179	2	
"Nuevayol"	Bad Bunny	January 18, 2025	3	92	
"Baile Inolvidable"	Bad Bunny	January 18, 2025	2	97*	
"DTMF"	Bad Bunny	January 18, 2025	1	97*	
"Voy a Llevarte Pa' PR"	Bad Bunny	January 18, 2025	8	55	
"Veldá"	Bad Bunny, Omar Courtz & Dei V	January 18, 2025	9	47	
"Perfumito Nuevo"	Bad Bunny & RaiNao	January 18, 2025	14	8	
"Weltita"	Bad Bunny & Chuwi	January 18, 2025	12	14	
"Eoo"	Bad Bunny	January 18, 2025	4	96*	
"Ketu Tecré"	Bad Bunny	January 18, 2025	20	7	
"Kloufrens"	Bad Bunny	January 18, 2025	18	23	
"Bokete"	Bad Bunny	January 18, 2025	28	6	
"Turista"	Bad Bunny	January 18, 2025	24	6	
"Café con Ron"	Bad Bunny & Los Pleneros de la Cresta	January 18, 2025	31	9	
"La Mudanza"	Bad Bunny	January 18, 2025	34	7	
"Lo Que Le Pasó a Hawaii"	Bad Bunny	January 18, 2025	43	6	
"Imagínate"	Danny Ocean & Kapo	January 18, 2025	88	6	
"Mi Refe"	Beéle & Ovy on the Drums	January 18, 2025	71	39	
"Deportivo"	Blessd x Anuel AA	January 25, 2025	182	2	
"Bandida"	Luis R Conríquez & Peso Pluma	February 1, 2025	129	3	
"Parte y Choke (Remix)"	Jombriel X Ryan Castro X Jotta X Alex Krack	February 1, 2025	70	11	
"Rosones"	Jorsshh & Fuerza Regida	February 1, 2025	187	1	
"7 Días"	Gabito Ballesteros & Tito Double P	February 15, 2025	39	17	
"Te Quería Ver"	Alemán X Netón Vega	February 22, 2025	25	29	
"Por Esos Ojos"	Fuerza Regida	March 1, 2025	49	20	
"Morena"	Netón Vega & Peso Pluma	March 1, 2025	47	29	
"M&M"	Netón Vega	March 8, 2025	97	11	
"El Mayor de Los Ranas"	Víctor Valverde X JR Torres	March 8, 2025	97	17	
"Mi Vida Mi Muerte"	Netón Vega	March 8, 2025	196	1	
"Tattoo"	Tito Double P	March 15, 2025	35	16	
"La Plena (W Sound 05)"	W Sound, Beéle & Ovy on the Drums	March 15, 2025	11	57	
"En Privado"	Xavi & Manuel Turizo	March 15, 2025	90	29	
"Vitamina"	Jombriel & DFZM	March 22, 2025	58	15	
"Mãe Solteira"	DG e Batidão Stronda, J. Eskine, MC Davi & MC G15	March 22, 2025	118	3	
"Rari"	Peso Pluma	March 29, 2025	194	1	
"Ojos Tristes"	Selena Gómez, Benny Blanco & The Marías	April 5, 2025	51	7	
"Con Otra"	Cazzu	April 5, 2025	76	3	
"Passo Bem Solto"	Atlxs	April 12, 2025	34	24	
"Montagem Tomada"	MXZI	April 19, 2025	59	13	
"Triple Lavada"	Esaú Ortiz	April 26, 2025	17	20	
"Como Capo"	Clave Especial & Fuerza Regida	April 26, 2025	127	6	
"Hollywood"	Peso Pluma & Estevan Plazola	April 26, 2025	143	5	
"Vita Fer"	Los Dareyes de la Sierra X Tito Double P	April 26, 2025	74	10	
"Tú Tú Tú"	Clave Especial & Edgardo Núñez	May 10, 2025	92	7	
"Amistad"	Blessd & Ovy on the Drums	May 10, 2025	154	1	
"Amigos? No."	Óscar Maydon X Netón Vega	May 10, 2025	149	6	
"Coqueta"	Fuerza Regida & Grupo Frontera	May 10, 2025	115	33	
"Marlboro Rojo"	Fuerza Regida	May 24, 2025	33	58	
"Milagros"	Karol G	May 24, 2025	119	3	
"Ansiedad"	Fuerza Regida	May 24, 2025	115	21	
"WASSUP"	Young Miko	May 24, 2025	163	2	
"Los Voltaje"	Sayfalse, Yb Wasg'Ood & Ariis	May 24, 2025	154	3	
"Tu Sancho"	Fuerza Regida	May 31, 2025	19	48	
"Luna Bala"	Yb Wasg'Ood & Ariis	May 31, 2025	89	8	
"Latina Foreva"	Karol G	June 7, 2025	55	8	
"No Tiene Sentido"	Beéle	June 7, 2025	27	36	
"Champagne"	Tito Double P	June 7, 2025	126	2	
"Droga"	Mora & C. Tangana	June 7, 2025	189	1	
"Top Diesel"	Beéle	June 21, 2025	117	17	
"Yo y Tú"	Ovy on the Drums, Quevedo & Beéle	June 28, 2025	82	18	
"Papasito"	Karol G	July 5, 2025	56	4	
"Verano Rosa"	Karol G & Feid	July 5, 2025	64	8	
"Coleccionando Heridas"	Karol G & Marco Antonio Solís	July 5, 2025	70	6	
"Ivonny Bonita"	Karol G	July 5, 2025	141	2	
"Amiga Mía"	Karol G & Greeicy	July 5, 2025	175	1	
"Día Delícia"	Nakama & MC Staff	July 5, 2025	115	11	
"Si Te Pillara"	Beéle	July 5, 2025	89	16	
"Dile Luna"	Karol G & Eddy Lover	July 5, 2025	183	1	
"Frecuencia"	Los Dareyes de la Sierra	July 12, 2025	42	19	
"Suiza"	Calle 24	July 12, 2025	114	8	
"Vamo a Bailotear"	Cris Mj	July 12, 2025	46	5	
"Perlas Negras"	Natanael Cano & Gabito Ballesteros	July 19, 2025	44	16	
"Corazón Partío"	Tito Double P	July 19, 2025	152	2	
"Blancanieves"	Natanael Cano	July 19, 2025	164	1	
"Por Sus Besos"	Tito Double P	July 26, 2025	49	15	
"Alambre Púa"	Bad Bunny	August 2, 2025	68	1	
"P do Pecado (Puro Suco do Brasil)"	Menos É Mais & Simone Mendes	August 9, 2025	57	22	
"Tú Vas Sin (Fav)"	Rels B	August 9, 2025	58	22	
"Chula Vente"	Luis R. Conríquez, Netón Vega & Fuerza Regida	August 16, 2025	62	9	
"Ojitos Mentirosos"	Chino Pacas	August 23, 2025	85	3	
"QLOO*"	Young Cister & Kreamly	August 30, 2025	81	12	
"Yogurcito"	Blessd	September 13, 2025	92	19	
"Todo Que Ver"	Jere Klein & Katteyes	September 13, 2025	122	11	
"Mientras Duermes"	Junior H	September 20, 2025	193	2	
"Shiny"	Easykid	September 27, 2025	52	8	
"Dos+Dos"	Omar Camacho x Víctor Mendivil	October 11, 2025	197	1	
"Orula"	Víctor Mendivil	October 18, 2025	169	1	
"Montagem Rugada"	Sayfalse, Cape & JXNDRO	October 25, 2025	181	4	
"Posso Até Não Te Dar Flores"	DJ Japa NK, MC Jacaré, MC Meno K, MC Ryan SP & DJ Davi DogDog	November 1, 2025	36	17	
"Cuando No Era Cantante"	El Bogueto x Yung Beef	November 8, 2025	5	22	
"444"	Yan Block & Panda Block	November 15, 2025	105	2	
"Bzrp Music Sessions, Vol. 0/66"	Bizarrap & Daddy Yankee	November 22, 2025	8	4	
"La Perla"	Rosalía & Yahritza y su Esencia	November 22, 2025	12	15	
"Reliquia"	Rosalía	November 22, 2025	29	2	
"Sexo, Violencia y Llantas"	Rosalía	November 22, 2025	43	1	
"Divinize"	Rosalía	November 22, 2025	57	1	
"Porcelana"	Rosalía	November 22, 2025	76	1	
"Dios es un Stalker"	Rosalía	November 22, 2025	90	1	
"La Yugular"	Rosalía	November 22, 2025	123	1	
"De Madrugá"	Rosalía	November 22, 2025	129	1	
"Mundo Nuevo"	Rosalía	November 22, 2025	149	1	
"No Batidão"	ZXKAI & sluxghter	November 22, 2025	28	30	
"La Rumba del Perdón"	Rosalía, Estrella Morente & Silvia Pérez Cruz	November 22, 2025	177	1	
"Sauvignon Blanc"	Rosalía	November 22, 2025	190	1	
"Intro"	Peso Pluma & Tito Double P	December 6, 2025	125	2	
"Chavalitas"	Fuerza Regida	December 6, 2025	161	2	
"Ya Borracho"	Herencia de Grandes	December 6, 2025	75	17	

== Spanish-language songs on the Billboard Hot 100 ==
The Billboard Hot 100 ranks the most-played songs in the United States based on sales (physical and digital), radio play, and online streaming. Also included are certifications awarded by the Recording Industry Association of America (RIAA) based on digital downloads and on-demand audio or video song streams: gold certification is awarded for sales of 500,000 copies, platinum for one million units, and multi-platinum for two million units, and following in increments of one million thereafter. The RIAA also awards Spanish-language songs under the Latin certification: Disco de Oro (Gold) is awarded for sales 30,000 certification copies, Disco de Platino (Platinum) for 60,000 units, and Disco de Multi-Platino (Multi-Platinum) for 120,000 units, and following in increments of 60,000 thereafter.

Song	Performer(s)	Entry	Peak	Weeks	RIAA certification	Ref.
2017 entries
"Feliz Navidad"	José Feliciano	January 7, 2017	6	43		
2024 entries
"Dos Días"	Tito Double P & Peso Pluma	September 21, 2024	51	20	46× Platinum (Latin)	
"Tu Boda"	Óscar Maydon & Fuerza Regida	November 2, 2024	22	20	28× Platinum (Latin)	
"Qué Pasaría..."	Rauw Alejandro & Bad Bunny	November 30, 2024	34	21	Gold (Latin)	
"Khé?"	Rauw Alejandro & Romeo Santos	November 30, 2024	60	10		
"El Clúb"	Bad Bunny	December 21, 2024	27	9		
"Rosones"	Tito Double P	December 21, 2024	76	8	9× Platinum (Latin)	
2025 entries
"Loco"	Netón Vega	January 11, 2025	43	20	2× Platinum (Latin)	
"Nadie"	Tito Double P	January 11, 2025	78	6	Diamond (Latin)	
"Pitorro de Coco"	Bad Bunny	January 11, 2025	50	5		
"Nuevayol"	Bad Bunny	January 18, 2025	5	26		
"Baile Inolvidable"	Bad Bunny	January 18, 2025	2	26		
"Voy a Llevarte Pa' PR"	Bad Bunny	January 18, 2025	14	20		
"DTMF"	Bad Bunny	January 18, 2025	1	30		
"Veldá"	Bad Bunny, Omar Courtz & Dei V	January 18, 2025	23	9		
"Perfumito Nuevo"	Bad Bunny & RaiNao	January 18, 2025	31	6		
"Weltita"	Bad Bunny & Chuwi	January 18, 2025	32	7		
"Eoo"	Bad Bunny	January 18, 2025	11	33		
"Ketu Tecré"	Bad Bunny	January 18, 2025	38	4		
"Kloufrens"	Bad Bunny	January 18, 2025	40	6		
"Bokete"	Bad Bunny	January 18, 2025	42	4		
"Turista"	Bad Bunny	January 18, 2025	45	4		
"Café con Ron"	Bad Bunny & Los Pleneros de la Cresta	January 18, 2025	48	6		
"Lo Que Le Pasó a Hawaii"	Bad Bunny	January 18, 2025	62	4		
"La Mudanza"	Bad Bunny	January 18, 2025	51	5		
"Me Jalo"	Fuerza Regida & Grupo Frontera	February 8, 2025	48	20		
"7 Días"	Gabito Ballesteros & Tito Double P	February 15, 2025	84	2		
"Por Esos Ojos"	Fuerza Regida	March 1, 2025	64	14		
"Tattoo"	Tito Double P	March 15, 2025	72	8	2× Platinum (Latin)	
"Te Quería Ver"	Alemán X Netón Vega	March 22, 2025	58	8	7× Platinum (Latin)	
"Ojos Tristes"	Selena Gómez, Benny Blanco & The Marías	April 5, 2025	56	5		
"Morena"	Netón Vega & Peso Pluma	April 12, 2025	83	6		
"Me Prometí"	Iván Cornejo	May 17, 2025	95	1		
"Marlboro Rojo"	Fuerza Regida	May 24, 2025	64	21		
"Latina Foreva"	Karol G	June 7, 2025	66	5		
"Tu Sancho"	Fuerza Regida	June 14, 2025	65	10		
"Papasito"	Karol G	July 5, 2025	74	1		
"Verano Rosa"	Karol G & Feid	July 5, 2025	96	1		
"Frecuencia"	Los Dareyes de La Sierra	August 2, 2025	82	9	2× Platinum (Latin)	
"Amor"	Emmanuell Cortés	November 8, 2025	88	7	19× Platinum (Latin)	
"La Perla"	Rosalía & Yahritza y su Esencia	November 22, 2025	82	1		

== Albums released ==
The following is a list of notable Latin albums (music performed in Spanish or Portuguese) (Note: In the United States, Billboard and the RIAA recognizes an album as "Latin" if 51% or more of its content is sung in the Spanish language. The Latin Recording Academy extends this definition of "Latin music" to include Portuguese-language records as well as other languages and dialects of Ibero-America such as Catalan, Nahuatl, Quechua, Galician, Valencia, and Mayan. The Latin Recording Academy also includes Latin instrumental recordings performed by Ibero-American musicians. Note that Spain and Portugal are included under this definition of Ibero-America.) that were released in Latin America, Spain, Portugal, or the United States in 2025.

=== First-quarter ===
==== January ====
Day	Title	Artist(s)	Genre(s)	Singles	Label
1	Puti Galaxy	Jamsha		"Preñala Bailando"	Trash Toy
5	Debí Tirar Más Fotos	Bad Bunny	Reggaeton, Salsa, Merengue, Trap, Jibaro, Bolero, Synth-pop, Plena, Bomba, Aguinaldo	"El Clúb"; "Pitorro de Coco"; "Baile Inolvidable"; "Turista"; "La Mudanza"; "Bokete"; "Ketu Tecré"	Rimas Entertainment
16	O Mundo dá Voltas	BaianaSystem	Dub, Batucada		Máquina de Louco
17	Seco	Ricardo Arjona			Metamorfosis Enterprises, Interscope
17	Parceiros, Vol. 3	Pedro Guerra		"Siempre Queda el Amor"; "Tiempo de Reír"; "Somos un Río"	Altafonte
17	Mundoagua - Celebrating Carla Bley	Arturo O'Farrill & The Afro Latin Jazz Orchestra	Big band, Latin jazz, Post-bop		
24	Son 30	Checo Acosta			Checumbia
28	No Soy Tu Hombre	Alba Reche	Ballad	"Digna de Ti"; "No Soy Tu Hombre"; "Todo Lo Que Conozco"	Universal Music Spain
28	Diamantes, Lágrimas e Rostos para Esquecer	BK			
30	Si Abro los Ojos No es Real	Amaia	Alternative pop, Ballad	"Nanai"; "Tocotó"; "Tengo un Pensamiento"; "M.A.P.S."	Universal Music Spain
30	Manual Prático Do Novo Samba Tradicional, Vol. 2: TIA DARCI	Marcelo D2			Pupila Dilatada, Elemess
30	Caminando Piango Piango	Orquesta Failde			
30	Ilusión Óptica	Pedrito Martinez			
31	Al Romper la Burbuja	Joaquina	Latin pop	"Quise Quererte"; "Escapar de Mí"; "Pesimista"; "El Alquimista"; "No Llames lo Mío Nuestro"; "Todo y Nada"	Universal Music Latino, UMG Recordings
31	La Carretera	Pedro Capó		"Adiós"; "Esto Se J***ó"; "La Carretera"; "¿De Qué Vamos a Hablar?"	Sony Music Latin
31	La Melodia Con La Calle, Vol. 1	Tony Dize	Reggaeton, Merengue	"Quisiera" "Sin GPS"	Rimas Entertainment
31	Saga	Yamandu Costa, Martín Sued e Orquestra Assintomática			Bagual

==== February ====
Day	Title	Artist(s)	Genre(s)	Singles	Label
7	Dolce Vita	Amaral	Indie pop	"Rompehielos"; "Ahí Estás"; "Libre"; "Los Demonios del Fuego"	Gatorama Music, Sony Music Spain
7	Fotografías	Rubén Blades featuring Roberto Delgado & Orquesta	Salsa		Ruben Blades Productions
7	Natti Natasha en Amargue	Natti Natasha		"Quiéreme Menos"; "Tu Loca"; "Escasez de Besos"; "Desde Hoy"	Pina, Sony Music Latin
7	Miami 1990	Café Quijano	Pop rock	"Sabes Qué Te Digo"; "Miami 1990"	Warner Music Spain
7	Radamés	São Paulo Chamber Soloists	Classical		Azul Music
7	Sin Llorar	Yuridia	Regional Mexican		
14	Ultra Sodades	Kevin Kaarl		"Esta Noche"; "No Me Culpes por Sentir"; "Búscame Otra Vez"	Kevin Kaarl
14	Mi Vida Mi Muerte	Netón Vega		"El Plumas"; "Mi Vida Mi Muerte"; "Morena"	Josa
14	Conjuros	Susana Baca			Altafonte
16	Baile à la Baiana	Seu Jorge	MPB		Altafonte
20	Mija No Te Asustes	Clave Especial	Regional Mexican		Altafonte
21	Lento Ternura	Zahara		"Yo Sólo Quería Escribir una Canción de Amor"; "Tus Michis"; "Quién Dijo"; "Demasiadas Canciones"	G.O.Z.Z. Records
21	Eterno Retorno	Astro Andy		"Diciembre En Medellin"	Only Palos Ma
21	Reações Adversas / Ao Persistirem Os Sintomas	Tó Brandileone	Brazilian rock		Lemon Music
24	Casa Coração	Joyce Alane	Roots		Carvalheira, Altafonte Brasil
25	La Pista	Juliana		"Manhattan"; "San Fernando"	MUN Entertainment, Warner Music Latin
25	Ton Carfi 20 Anos (Ao Vivo)	Ton Carfi			Som Livre
26	Rozalén por Chavela	Rozalén		"Paloma Negra"	Sony Music Spain
27	Sagitario II	Yuriel Es Musica		"K.O."	Royal Factory Music
28	25 Aniversario	Luis Ángel "El Flaco"			Sony Music Mexico
28	Reflexiones	Grupo Cultura	Tejano		Grupo Cultura Music
28	V1V0	Alfredo Olivas	Norteño		Grupo Cultura Music

==== March ====
Day	Title	Artist(s)	Genre(s)	Singles	Label
6	Satirología	Kidd Voodoo		"Satirología"	Kidd Voodoo
6	Papota	Ca7riel & Paco Amoroso	Alternative		5020
6	Edición Limitada	Banda MS	Banda		Lizos Music
7	Astropical	Astropical (Bomba Estéreo & Rawayana)	Latin, Tropical House	"Me Pasa (Piscis)"; "Corazón Adentro (Escorpio)"; "Noche en Caracas (Tauro)"	Sony Music Latin
7	Transcende (Ao Vivo)	Lauana Prado	Sertanejo		Universal Music
11	Bhavilonia	Bhavi		"Me Desperté"	GMR
13	Manual Prático Do Novo Samba Tradicional, Vol. 3: LUIZA	Marcelo D2	MPB		Pupila Dilatada, Elemes, Altafonte
13	Quanto Mais Eu Como, Mais Fome Eu Sinto!	Djonga	Alternative		A Quadrilha
14	El Cuerpo Después de Todo	Valeria Castro	Chanson	"La Soledad"; "Sentimentalmente"; "Debe Ser"; "Tiene Que Ser Más Fácil"	Warner Music Spain
14	Vibras de Noche II	Eslabón Armado	Banda		Armado Records
14	Nada Personal	Joyce Santana	Reggaeton	"Ferxxoko"	Rimas Entertainment
20	Girasoles	Jay Wheeler			
21	Jesucrista Superstar	Rigoberta Bandini	Indie pop, Europop	"Si Muriera Mañana"; "Pamela Anderson"; "Kaiman"; "Aprenderás"; "Busco un Centro de Gravedad Permanente"	Rigoberta Bandini
21	Y el Canto de Todas	Rafael Serrallet and Lviv National Philharmonic			Independiente
25	Anna Vol2. El Ojo de Mi Frente	Cami		"Cierro los Ojos"; "Poseída"; "No Quiero ir a la Guerra"; "Pasará el Tiempo"; "El Ojo de Mi Frente"	Universal Music Chile
26	Colángelo... Tango	José Colángelo	Tango		MAMP Songs
27	Después de los 30	Raquel Sofía			Warner Music Mexico
27	La Jerarquía	Peter Manjarrés and Luis José Villa	Vallenato		Peter Manjarrés
27	Milonguín	Giovanni Parra Quinteto	Tango		
27	Somos Leyenda	Grupo Maximo Grado	Regional Mexican		
28	Traumatismo Kraneoencefálico II	Yung Beef & Goa			La Vendicion Records
28	Malcriado	Lasso		"¿vienes o voy?"; "Cinco Minutos Más"; "Cuando Te Dejan de Querer"; "Fetiche"	Universal Music Mexico
28	Novela	Fito Páez	Rock opera	"Cuando el Circo Llega al Pueblo"; "Superextraño"	Sony Music Latin
28	Clásicos 1.0	Grupo Niche	Salsa		
31	Coisas Naturais	Marina Sena	Alternative pop, Latin pop, Contemporary R&B, Pop rock	"Numa Ilha"; "Ouro de Tolo"	Sony Music Brasil

=== Second-quarter ===
==== April ====
Day	Title	Artist(s)	Genre(s)	Singles	Label
1	Luces y Sombras	Iván "Melon" Lewis Trio	Latin jazz		Iván Melon Lewis
3	Don Kbrn	Eladio Carrión	Reggaeton	"H.I.M"	Rimas
3	Vándalos	Bandalos Chinos	Pop rock	"El Ritmo"; "Comando Juntar"; "Revelación II"	Bandalos Chinos
3	Legado	A.N.I.M.A.L.	Heavy metal		Sony Music Argentina
3	Sinfónico — En Vivo	Yandel	Reggaeton		
4	Gigante	Leiva	Latin rock, Latin pop	"Gigante"; "Bajo Presión"; "Ángulo Muerto"; "El Polvo de los Días Raros"; "Caída Libre"	Sony Music Spain
4	El Más Completo	Alex Bueno	Bachata, merengue		Mayimba Music
8	80'z	BB Trickz	Latin rap	"Not a Preety Girl"	Sony Music Spain
10	Qué Sed	Luck Ra	Cuarteto	"Hola Perdida"; "Un Siglo Sin Ti"; "Vuela"; "Suavemente"; "Un Clavo"	Sony Music Latin
11	YTSQS	FloyyMenor	Reggaeton	"Bayamón"; "Tú Me Calientas"; "Mamii"; "Banshee"; "Toa"	Sonar
11	Dile No A Las Drogas	Slayter	Reggaeton, Trap		Sonar
11	¿Por Qué No Ser Amigos?	Hombres G	Latin pop	"Te Quiero"; "Devuélveme a Mi Chica"; "Marta Tiene un Marcapasos"	Warner Music Spain, La Calabaza Amarilla
11	Acústico	Beto Cuevas	Latin rock	"Mentira"; "El Duelo"; "Vuelvo"	Blackelbow Music
15	Divina Casca	Rachel Reis	MPB		Altafonte Brasil
16	Ya No Estoy Aquí	Rayos Laser	Latin alternative	"Imán"; "El Fin del Amor"; "El Día y la Noche"	Geiser Discos
18	Dominguinho	João Gomes, Mestrinho e Jota.pê	Folk		Jg Shows, Believe Music
22	Genes Rebeldes	Aterciopelados	Latin alternative	"Apocalipsis"	Entre Casa
23	Inmersión	Javiera Mena	Latin pop	"Volver a Llorar"; "Entropía"; "Mar de Coral"	Geiser Discos
23	Los Nuevos Canticuentos	Canticuentos, Coro de Ríogrande	Children's music		Gaira Música Local
24	Cancionera	Natalia Lafourcade	Folk	"Amor Clandestino"; "Cancionera"; "Como Quisiera Quererte"	Sony Music Latin
24	Latinaje	Cazzu	Latin pop	"La Cueva"; "Dolce"; "Con Otra"	Rimas, Dale Play
24	Veraneio	Veraneio			
25	Cuentas Perdidas	Bunbury	Latin rock	"Para Llegar Hasta Aquí"; "Las Chingadas Ganas de Llorar"; "Te Puedes a Todo Acostrumbrar"; "Serpiente"	Warner Music Spain
25	Bogotá	Andrés Cepeda	Latin pop	"Una Flor"	Warner Music Latina
25	Cosas Que Sorprenden a la Audiencia	Vivir Quintana			Universal Music Mexico
25	De Rey a Rey (En Vivo Desde La Plaza de Toros La México, 2024)	Alejandro Fernández			Universal Music Mexico
28	El Vuelo	Gloria Trevi	Latin pop		
29	No Vayas a Atender Cuando el Demonio Llama	Lali	Latin pop	"Fanático"; "No Me Importa"; "Mejor Que Vos"; "33"; "Plástico"	Sony Music Argentina

==== May ====
Day	Title	Artist(s)	Genre(s)	Singles	Label
2	111xpantia	Fuerza Regida	Regional Mexican	"Por Esos Ojos"	Sony Music Latin, Street Mob, Rancho Humilde
8	Pueblo Salvaje II	Manuel Carrasco	Latin pop	"Pueblo Salvaje"; "El Grito del Niño"; "Mi Dignidad"; "Tengo el Poder"	Universal Music Spain
8	Mango Dragon Fruit	Sérgio Britto	Bossa nova, Pop, Música popular brasileira		Midas Music
8	Frente a Frente	Pesado	Norteño		Warner Music Latina
8	Maravilhosamente Bem	Julia Mestre	Pop		Warner Music Latina
8	Redención	Los Dareyes de la Sierra	Regional Mexican		
8	Gris	Luis Figueroa	Salsa		
9	Nuevo Hotel Miranda!	Miranda!	Latin pop	"Triste"; "Hace Rato"; "Me Gusta"	Sony Music Latin
9	Preguntas a las 11:11	Ela Taubert	Latin pop	"¿Y Si Eras Tú?"; "¿Por Qué No Me Fui Antes?"; "¿Cómo Pasó?"; "¿Paa Qué?"; "¿Por Qué Soy Así?"; "¿Es En Serio?"	Universal Music Latino
9	Novato Apostador	Eddy Herrera	Merengue		Intermusic
9	Milly Quezada - Live Vol. 1 Desde el Teatro Nacional de República Dominicana	Milly Quezada	Merengue		PAJGR Music
9	Coritos Vol. 1	Israel & New Breed	Christian		Integrity Music
9	Memóri4s (Ao Vivo)	Eli Soares	Christian		Universal Music
9	Alcione	Alcione	Samba		Universal Music
10	Evolución	Grupo Firme	Contemporary Regional Mexican		Music VIP
12	El Último Baile	Silvestre Dangond	Tropical latin		Sony Music Latin
15	Spanish Leather	Guitarricadelafuente	Singer-Songwriter	"Full Time Papi"; "Futuros Amantes"; "Tramuntana"; "Pipe Dream"; "BABIECAI"	Sony Music Spain
15	De Chava	Yeri Mua	Reggaeton	"Traka"; "Croketita"; "Avión Privado"; "Él No es Tuyo"; "Modo Antidepresivo"; "Morrita (Tinker Bell)"	Sony Music Latin
15	Leyenda	DannyLux	Regional Mexican	"Ya No Estás"; "Cielo Eterno"	VPS Music LLC
15	Reparto	Gente de Zona	Tropical latin	"La Conga"; "Almohada"; "Cosas Bonitas"; "Rico Cantidad"	Altafonte
15	Sorriso Eu Gosto No Pagode Vol. 3 - Homenagem Ao Fundo De Quintal (Gravado Em Londres)	Sorriso Maroto	Samba		Sony Music Brasil
15	Borondo	Beéle	Urbano		
16	La Belleza	Lido Pimienta	Modern classical	"Mango"	Anti Records
16	Sílvia & Salvador	Sílvia Pérez Cruz & Salvador Sobral	Chamber folk	"Ben Poca Cosa Tens"; "Hoje Já Não é Tarde"	Warner Music Spain
16	Milagro	Sebastián Yatra	Latin pop	"Una Noche Sin Pensar"; "Vagabundo"; "Energía Bacana"; "Los Domingos"; "2AM"	Universal Music Latino
16	Infinito Positivo	Los Hermanos Rosario	Salsa		Pepe Rosario, La Oreja Media Group, Inc
16	El Siguiente Paso (Live Session)	Marian y Mariel	Tejano		Onerpm
16	Joropango	Kerreke and Daniela Padrón	Folk		
16	Por Esas Trenzas	Lourdes Carhuas			Le Miau
16	Voy a Levantarme	Banda Los Sebastianes de Saúl Plata	Regional Mexican		
17	A Tres Días de la Tierra	Eruca Sativa	Latin rock	"Lío"; "No Pasarán"; "Volarte"	Sony Music Argentina
18	Lo Mismo de Siempre	Mora	Reggaeton	"Aurora"; "De Paquete"; "Droga"; "El Último Beso"; "La Presidencial"; "Mil Vidas"; "Más Que Algo"	Rimas
19	4218	Julión Álvarez y su Norteño Banda	Banda		Copar
20	Para Quién Trabajas, Vol. 1	Marilina Bertoldi	New wave	"Autoestima"; "Por Siempre es un Lugar"	Sony Music Latin
20	Hamilton de Holanda Trio - Live In NYC	Hamilton de Holanda	Latin jazz		Sony Music Brasil
21	Gracias a la Vida	Abel Pintos	Latin pop	"Eres"	Sony Music Argentina
22	Ya Es Mañana	Morat	Latin pop	"Faltas Tú"; "Antes de los 30"; "Por Si No Te Vuelvo a Ver"; "La Policía"; "Cuarto de Hotel"; "Me Toca a Mí"	Universal Music Latino
22	Puertas	El Cuarteto de Nos	Latin pop	"En el Cuarto de Nico"	Porfiado Records
22	Lo Que Nos Faltó Decir	Jesse & Joy	Latin pop, Regional Mexican	"Lo Que Nos Faltó a Decir"; "Te Perdí"; "Cuando Estamos Solos"; "Digas Lo Que Digas"; "Accidente"; "Empinar el Codo"	Warner Music Latina
22	Casa Mía	Vanesa Martín	Latin pop	"Objetos Perdidos"; "60s"; "Tenemos Universo de Sobra"; "No Nos Supimos Querer"	Universal Music Spain
22	¿Quién + Como Yo?	Christian Nodal	Ranchera		Sony Music Mexico
22	Ya No Se Llevan Serenatas	Gabito Ballesteros	Urbano		Sony Music Mexico
23	Daisy	Rusowsky	Alternative R&B	"SOPHIA"; "ALTAGAMA"; "BBY ROMEO"; "LIAR?"; "sukkKK!!"	Warner Records
23	¿Y Ahora Qué?	Alejandro Sanz	Latin pop	"Palmeras en el Jardín"; "How No Me Siento Bien"; "Cómo Sería"; "Bésame"	Sony Music Spain
23	De Amor Nadie Se Muere	Karen Lizaraz	Vallenato		Small Water Music
23	La Lotería	Los Tigres del Norte	Norteño		Fono, RMS Music
23	La Fleur de Cayenne	Paquito D'Rivera and Madrid-New York Connection Band	Latin jazz		Fono, RMS Music
23	Legado	Marcos Witt	Christian		Fono, RMS Music
23	Masters of Our Roots	Albita and Chucho Valdés			Innercat Entertainment
26	Mira Como Vengo	Issac Delgado	Salsa		AnZn
26	Baila Kolombia	Los Cumbia Stars	Cumbia		Discos Fuentes
26	Um Mar Pra Cada Um	Luedji Luna	MPB		Dan Produções
24	Eterno	Prince Royce	Bachata	"How Deep Is Your Love"; "I Want It That Way"	
27	Un Instante	Louta	Alternative music	"No Sé Quién Sos"	J30
27	A Maior Honra	Julliany Souza	Christian		Criative Music, Julliany Souza
27	No Escuro, Quem É Você?	Carol Biazin	Pop		Universal Music
28	FUTURX PRIMITVX 2025	Systema Solar	Alternative music	"Pa' Que Lo Bailen"; "El Pum Pum"; "Futuro Primitivo"; "Fiesta"	Sambumbia Publishing
28	El Club de la Pelea I	Airbag	Alternative rock	"Anarquía en Buenos Aires"; "Verte de Cerca"; "El Hombre Puerco"; "Especial 56"	Dale Play Records
28	Beleza. Mas Agora A Gente Faz O Que Com Isso?	Rubel	MPB		Dorileo, Altafonte Brasil
28	Enquanto Os Distraídos Amam	Pedro Emílio			Esfera
28	Raíces	Gloria Estefan	Latin Pop	"Raíces"; "La Vecina (No Sé Na')"	Sony Music Latin
29	Mi Suerte Es Ser Mexicano	Pepe Aguilar	Ranchera		Equinoccio
29	Big Buraco	Jadsa	Rock/alternative		Selo Risco
29	Let's Go Rodeo	Ana Castela	Sertanejo		Onda Musical
29	Jirafas	Rita Rosa	Chlildren's		Onda Musical
29	Sendé	Ryan Castro	Urbano		
29	Noches de Cantina	Maná	Latin rock		
29	¿Qué Significa El Amor?	Carlos Rivera	Latin pop		
30	Cuarto azul	Aitana	Latin pop, Electropop, Synth pop	"Segundo Intento"; "Sentimiento Natural"; "6 de Febrero"; "Cuando Hables con Él"	Universal Music Spain
30	Arenbi	Leonel García	Alternative music	"Caballo Negro"; "Spotlight"; "Contacto"; "Solo Di Sí"; "OMG"; "Bet On Me"; "Una Segunda Vez"; "Serious"; "Better Than Sex"; "Donde Quiero Estar"	Sony Music Mexico
30	Aguachile	India Martínez	Latin pop	"Equipo Favorito"; "Borachita Perdía"; "Karma"	Sony Music Spain
30	Puñito de Yocahú	Vicente García	Alternative music		Sony Music Latin
30	MPC (Música Popular Carioca)	Papatinho	Urbano		Universal Music
30	Big Swing	José Alberto "El Canario"	Salsa		Los Canarios Music, La Oreja Media
30	Bingo	Alain Pérez	Contemporary tropical		Tumbao
30	Bobby Pulido & Friends Una Tuya y Una Mía (Vol.1/En Vivo)	Bobby Pulido	Tejano		Fono, Universal Music Mexico
30	Imperfecto, Vol. 2	El Plan	Tejano		Indepe Music
30	Yo No Te Perdí	Gabriella	Tejano		Grupo Cultura Music
30	El Plan & Manuel Alejandro	El Plan and Manuel Alejandro	Norteño		Indepe Music
30	Pasado, Presente, Futuro	La Energía Norteña	Norteño		Azteca
30	#Anónimas&Resilientes	Voces del Bullerengue	Folk		Chaco World Music
30	En Vivo 20 Años	Tanghetto	Tango		Constitution Music Argentina
30	Flamencas	Las Migas	Flamenco		Las Migas Music
30	Do Velho Testamento	Tierry	Sertanejo		Virgin Music
30	Aventuras De Caramelo	Antonio Caramelo and Malibu	Children's		Malibu Studios, Onerpm
30	Algorhythm	Los Wizzards	Rock		

==== June ====
Day	Title	Artist(s)	Genre(s)	Singles	Label
6	Square Houze Vol. 1	Various Artists	Reggaeton	"Replay"; "Trajecito XS"	Warner Music Latina
6	Rico o Muerto, Vol. 1	Óscar Maydon	Regional Mexican		
6	Poeta Herío	Elvis Crespo	Merengue		
9	Ferxxo Vol X: Sagrado	Feid	Reggaeton		
12	Nave Dragón	Lola Índigo	Latin pop	"1000COSAS"; "La Reina"; "Pesadillas"; "Perreito Pa Llorar"; "La Reina (Remix)"; "Q Somos?"	Universal Music Spain
12	Y Lo Que Viene	Grupo Frontera	Regional Mexican		
13	El Sobreviviente WWW	Wisin	Reggaeton	"Luna"	La Base Music Group
20	Tropicoqueta	Karol G	Latin pop	"Si Antes Te Hubiera Conocido"; "Latina Foreva"	Bichota Records, Interscope
20	Sandunguero 3	DJ Blass	Reggaeton	"Stripper"; "Se Escapo"; "B.L.A.S.S."	Universal Music Latino
20	AfroLova 25'	Rels B			
26	Sr. Santos II Sueños De Grandeza	Arcángel	Urbano		
27	Apocalipsis	Cris MJ	Urbano		
27	No Fue Suerte	Chuy Montana	Regional Mexican		

=== Third-quarter ===
==== July ====
Day	Title	Artist(s)	Genre(s)	Singles	Label
1	Porque La Demora	Natanael Cano	Regioanl Mexican		
3	Por Si Alguien Nos Escucha	Kapo	Urbano		
11	Blesss The Album	Lomiiel	Dembow	"Hay Lupita"; "Te Morite"; "Pa Que Lo Bailes (Bailalo Rocky)"	FreeBandz Ent.
17	Island Boyz	Myke Towers	Reggaeton		
24	Tutankamon	Victor Mendivil	Regioanl Mexican		
25	Aquí Se Vino A Perrear	Maldy	Reggaeton	"Tiempos De Plan B"; "CLAP!"; "Chichi Pana"; "Quedate Soltera"; "La Dieta"; "PILA D CUERO"; "SOMOS 3"	Warner Music Latina
25	Freedom	J Alvarez	Reggaeton	"Zaza"; "Bella"; "Dando"	GLAD Empire
31	Sin Rodeos	Paola Jara	Regioanl Mexican		
31	Babylon Club	Danny Ocean	Latin pop		
31	Perfectas	Emilia			

==== August ====
Day	Title	Artist(s)	Genre(s)	Singles	Label
1	Cristian	Chino Pacas	Regional Mexican		
1	Millo Gangster Club	Bryant Myers	Reggaeton, Trap		Rimas Entertainment
15	Mixteip	J Balvin	Reggaeton		
24	A Tribute to Benny Moré and Nat King Cole	Gonzalo Rubalcaba, Yainer Horta & Joey Calveiro	Latin jazz		Calveiro Entertainment
28	The Original Influencers: Dizzy, Chano & Chico	Arturo O'Farrill & The Afro Latin Jazz Orchestra featuring Pedrito Martinez, Daymé Arocena, Jon Faddis, Donald Harrison & Melvis Santa	Latin jazz		
28	Meneo	Luis R. Conriquez	Regional Mexican		
29	Vanguardia Subterránea: Live at The Village Vanguard	Miguel Zenón Quartet	Latin jazz		
29	Rock Doido	Gaby Amarantos			
29	Six	Duquesa			

==== September ====
Day	Title	Artist(s)	Genre(s)	Singles	Label
25	La Vida Era Más Corta	Milo J			
26	Cosa Nuestra: Capítulo 0	Rauw Alejandro	Urbano		
26	Llegué Yo	Jerry Rivera	Salsa		
26	The Perfect Melody II - Chapter I	Zion	Reggaeton		Warner Music Latina

=== Fourth-quarter ===
==== October ====
Day	Title	Artist(s)	Genre(s)	Singles	Label
3	El Rey de la Habana	Wampi	Urbano		
3	Lo Que Me Falta Por Llorar	Grupo Frontera	Regional Mexican		
10	Matando La Liga 2	Jory Boy	Reggaeton, Trap	"QDMT"; "Dandole"; "Gatita"; "Paris"; "Marbella"; "Te Pregunto"	La Base Music Group
16	Lamento en Baile	Daddy Yankee	Latin Christian, Latin pop, merengue		
23	Bendito Verano	Elena Rose	Latin pop		

==== November ====
Day	Title	Artist(s)	Genre(s)	Singles	Label
6	KM0	Pablo Alborán	Latin pop		
7	Lux	Rosalía	Orchestral pop, art pop, classical, avant-pop	"Berghain"; "La Perla"	Columbia
14	FX De La Rose	De La Rose	Reggaeton, Trap	"Los Fin De"; "Cobro"; "Nubes"; "Palgo"; "5 Minutos"; "$extape"	Warner Music Latina
21	Fragmento	Javy the Flow	Reggaeton, Trap	"Cero a Uno"; "Mute"; "Medio Millon"	
21	Yo Soy La Fama Vol. 2	Ñejo	Reggaeton	"Dentro De La Disco"; "Princesa"	
25	Under Landia	Maicol y Manuel	Reggaeton		21 Crew
28	Better Late Than Never	Romeo Santos and Prince Royce	Bachata	"Estocolmo"; "Dardos"; "Lokita Por Mí"	Sony Latin, I Love Amiguita

== Deaths ==
- January 1 – Leo Dan, 82, Argentine singer and composer
- January 15 — José Luis de la Paz, 57 Spanish guitarist
- January 19 — Víctor Yaipén, Peruvian singer and founder of Orquesta Candela
- February 2 — Marc Lloret, 51, keyboardist and founder of Mishima
- February 5 — Angélica Infante, Mexican rock singer
- February 17 – Paquita la del Barrio, 77, Mexican singer
- February 20 — Wilson Saoko, 73, Colombian salsa singer and member of Fruko y sus Tesos
- February 22 — Lillian, 76, Brazilian singer and composer, cancer.
- March 9 — Diomedes Núñez Guzmán, 58, Dominican Republic trumpeter, composer and singer
- March 17 — Aurelio Martínez, 55, Honduran musician and politician, plane crash.
- March 26 — Tommy Rey, 80, Chilean singer and founder of La Sonora de Tommy Rey
- April 8:
  - Rubby Pérez, 69, Dominican Republic merengue singer
  - Luis Solís, Dominican Republic merengue saxophonist
- April 15 — Idelectrox, Puerto Rican singer, producer, and songwriter
- April 16 — Carlos Robledo, Mexican pioneer of electronic music, founder of Decibel
- April 17 — Jaime Rodríguez, Mexican rock bass guitarist, member of El Haragán y Compañía
- April 24 — Edy Star, 87, Brazilian singer-songwriter, actor, and visual artist.
- April 25 — Roberto de Regina, 98, Brazilian harpsichordist and conductor
- May 1 – Nana Caymmi, 84, Brazilian singer
- May 14 — Dharío Primero, 72, Dominican singer.
- May 18 — David Lerma "El Guadaña, 61, Argentine singer and lead vocalist of Banda Bostik
- May 20 — Nicky Jones, Argentine singer
- May 23 — Piti Sanz, 59, Spanish composer
- May 27 — Juan Manuel Muñoz Expósito, 81, Spanish flamenco guitarist
- June 12 — Eduardo Miño Naranjo, Ecuadorian singer and member of Hermanos Miño Naranjo
- June 14 — Bira Presidente, 88, Brazilian singer and percussionist, member of Fundo de Quintal
- June 21 — Juanito Márquez, 95, Cuban guitarist, arranger, and songwriter
- June 26:
  - Ocasional Talento, 29, Bolivian rapper
  - Lalo Schifrin, 93, Argentine-born American film and television composer (Mission: Impossible, Dirty Harry, Rush Hour), five-time Grammy Award winner, complications from pneumonia.
- June 28 — Carlos Schvartzman, 77, Paraguayan musician, composer, and arranger.
- July 9 — Araceli Julio, 39, Argentine singer and vocalist for Satelite Kingston
- July 11 — Luvi Torres, 36, Argentine folk singer
- July 19:
  - José Moreno Hurtado, 81, Spanish singer and member of Los Payos
  - Aldo Monges, 83, Argentine singer.
- July 24 — Amalia Macías, 91, Mexican singer and actress.
- July 31 — Flaco Jiménez, 86, American musician (Texas Tornados, Los Super Seven).
- August 6 — Eddie Palmieri, 88, American pianist and composer, nine-time Grammy Award winner.
- August 31 — Diego de Morón, 78, Spanish guitarist.
- September 3 — Gustavo Suárez Sarcos, Venezuelan accordionist and founder of Tecupae
- September 13 — Hermeto Pascoal, 89, Brazilian jazz musician, multiple organ failure.
- September 22 — B-King and Regio Clown, Colombian music duo (shot)
