= Corazón de Piedra =

2024 single by Xavi

Single by Xavi

from the album Next
- Released: March 23, 2024
- Genre: Regional Mexican; sierreño
- Length: 3:13
- Label: Interscope
- Songwriters: Joshua Xavier Gutierrez; Mario Caceres; Verónica Castillo; Fabio Gutierrez; Alex Hernández
- Producer: Ernesto Fernandez

Xavi singles chronology
"La Diabla" (2023)	"Corazón de Piedra" (2024)	"Ya Te Superé" (2024)

Music video
- "Corazón de Piedra" on YouTube

"Corazón de Piedra" (Heart of Stone) is a song by American singer-songwriter Xavi, released on March 23, 2024, as the fifth single from his debut studio album, Next (2024). It was written by Xavi himself, Mario Caceres, Verónica Castillo, Fabio Gutierrez and Alex Hernández and produced by Ernesto Fernandez.

== Composition ==
"Corazón de Piedra" is a sierreño song. The lyrics center around Xavi severing relations with a partner who has betrayed him and recovering from his heartbreak.

== Music video ==
The music video was released on March 21, 2025. In the clip, after breaking up with his ex-girlfriend, Xavi starts partying at a mansion with other women. His ex is later caught looking through his social media posts about his new life.

== Charts ==
Chart performance for "Corazón de Piedra"
Chart (2025)	Peak position
Global 200 (Billboard)	43
Mexico (Billboard)	3
US Billboard Hot 100	73
US Hot Latin Songs (Billboard)	4
