= Gervonta (song) =

2024 single by Peso Pluma

Single by Peso Pluma
- Released: 5 December 2024
- Genre: Corridos tumbados
- Length: 2:47
- Label: Double P
- Songwriters: Hassan Emilio Kabande Laija; César López Zazueta; Eduardo Alexander Favela; Fernando Rubio Rodriguez; Roberto Castro
- Producers: Peso Pluma; Iván Leal "Parka"; Ernesto Fernández

Peso Pluma singles chronology
"Dos Días" (2024)	"Gervonta" (2024)	"Hollywood" (2024)

"Gervonta" is a single by Mexican singer Peso Pluma, released on 5 December 2024. It was produced by Peso Pluma, Iván Leal "Parka" and Ernesto Fernández. The song is named after American boxer Gervonta Davis.

== Composition ==
The song begins with a slow, somber rhythm and quickly transitions into the more uptempo, multi-instrumental sound that has defined Peso Pluma's corridos tumbados style. Over a trumpet and guitar-led instrumental, he sings about his reflects on his journey to success, boasts his extravagant, fast-paced lifestyle (which is characterized by wealth, travel and indulgence) and highlights the privileges and temptations of fame. He compares his lifestyle to that of American gangster Al Capone, In the chorus, he mentions watching a Gervonta Davis boxing match in Las Vegas from the front row, buying shiny watches and flying on private jets.

== Charts ==
Chart performance for "Gervonta"
Chart (2024–2025)	Peak position
Global 200 (Billboard)	127
Mexico (Billboard)	8
US Bubbling Under Hot 100 (Billboard)	4
US Hot Latin Songs (Billboard)	11
