= La Víctima =

Single by Xavi

from the album Next
- Language: Spanish
- English title: "The Victim"
- Released: August 17, 2023
- Genre: Regional Mexican; urban sierreño; ranchera
- Length: 2:36
- Label: Interscope
- Songwriter: Joshua Xavier Gutiérrez
- Producer: Ernesto Fernández

Xavi singles chronology
"Sin Pagar Renta" (2023)	"La Víctima" (2023)	"Poco a Poco" (2020)

Music video
- "La Víctima" on YouTube

"La Víctima" is a song by American singer-songwriter Xavi, which was released as a single on August 17, 2023, through Interscope. The song achieved virality through TikTok, which lead to becoming the singer's breakthrough single, debuting at number 91 on the Billboard Hot 100 and peaking at number 46. Prior to the release of "La Diabla", which would be the singer's second breakthrough single, the song would debut at number 46 on the US Hot Latin Songs chart, eventually peaking at number three on the chart.

== Charts ==
=== Weekly charts ===
Weekly chart performance for "La Víctima"
Chart (2023–2024)	Peak position
Bolivia (Billboard)	14
Colombia (Billboard)	7
Ecuador (Billboard)	7
Global 200 (Billboard)	10
Mexico (Billboard)	2
US Billboard Hot 100	46
US Hot Latin Songs (Billboard)	3

=== Year-end charts ===
Year-end chart performance for "La Victima"
Chart (2024)	Position
Global 200 (Billboard)	134
US Hot Latin Songs (Billboard)	10
