= Dos Días =

2024 single by Tito Double P and Peso Pluma

Single by Tito Double P and Peso Pluma

from the album Incómodo
- Released: 31 October 2024
- Genre: Regional Mexican; Latin urban
- Length: 2:33
- Label: Double P
- Songwriters: Jesús Roberto Lajia García; Miguel Armenta; Jorge Jiménez
- Producers: Tito Double P; Ernesto Fernández; Arturo García

Tito Double P singles chronology
"El Lokerón" (2024)	"Dos Días" (2024)	"Nadie" (2024)

Peso Pluma singles chronology
"La Patrulla" (2024)	"Dos Días" (2024)	"Gervonta" (2024)

Music video
- "Dos Días" on YouTube

"Dos Días" is a song by Mexican rappers Tito Double P and Peso Pluma from the former's debut studio album, Incómodo (2024). It was released as the album's tenth single on 31 October 2024. The song revolves around heartbreak and anger.

== Charts ==
=== Weekly charts ===
Weekly chart performance for "Dos Días"
Chart (2024)	Peak position
Global 200 (Billboard)	28
Mexico (Billboard)	2
US Billboard Hot 100	51
US Hot Latin Songs (Billboard)	2

=== Year-end charts ===
Year-end chart performance for "Dos Días"
Chart (2025)	Position
Global 200 (Billboard)	121
US Hot Latin Songs (Billboard)	16
