= Netón Vega =

Mexican singer-songwriter (born 2003)

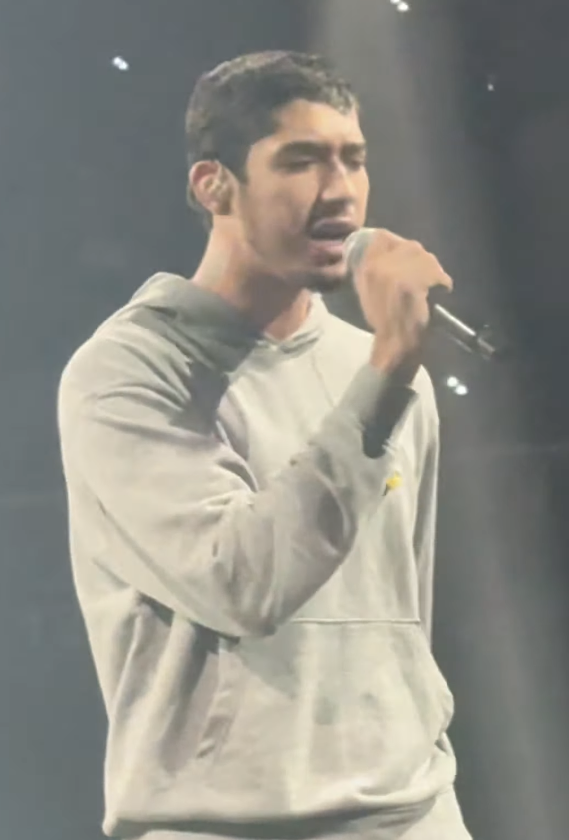
- Vega performing in September 2024

Background information
- Born: Luis Ernesto Vega Carvajal; 22 January 2003 (age 23); La Paz, Baja California Sur, Mexico
- Genres: Regional Mexican; corridos tumbados; reggaeton
- Occupations: Singer; songwriter
- Years active: 2023–present
- Labels: Josa, Warner Music Latina

Luis Ernesto Vega Carvajal, known professionally as Netón Vega, is a Mexican singer-songwriter from La Paz, Baja California Sur. He is known for his songwriting on "Rubicon" and "La People", taken from Peso Pluma's album Génesis (2023), and for collaborating with Luis R. Conriquez on the 2024 single "Si No Quieres No", which appeared on the US Billboard Hot 100.

== Discography ==
=== Studio albums ===
Title	Details	Peak chart positions			
Title	Details	US	US Latin	US Reg. Mex.	US Latin Rhythm
Mi Vida Mi Muerte	Released: 14 February 2025; Label: Josa; Formats: Digital download, streaming	19	2	7	—
Delirium	Released: 13 November 2025; Label: Josa; Formats: Digital download, streaming	—	29	—	12

=== Extended plays ===
Title	Details
Jalense la Greña	Released: 18 October 2024; Label: Josa; Formats: Digital download, streaming

=== Singles ===
List of singles, with selected chart positions and album name
Title	Year	Peak chart positions				Certifications	Album
Title	Year	MEX	US	US Latin	WW	Certifications	Album
"Nos Amaneció"	2023	—	—	—	—		Non-album singles
"Nadie Sabe" (with Frecuencia Privada)	2023	—	—	—	—		Non-album singles
"Los Kamikazes" (with La Gavilla)	2023	—	—	—	—		Non-album singles
"La Vida Loca" (with El Padrinito Toys)	2023	—	—	—	—		Non-album singles
"El Vocho" (with Legión RG)	2023	—	—	—	—		Non-album singles
"La Capi"	2023	—	—	—	—		Non-album singles
"Háganse a un Lado" (with Legión RG & Enigma Norteño)	2024	—	—	—	—		Non-album singles
"Si No Quieres No" (with Luis R Conriquez)	2024	1	53	2	34	RIAA: 3× Platinum	Non-album singles
"Sin Ti"	2024	—	—	—	—		Non-album singles
"Cómo Te Voy a Olvídar"	2024	—	—	—	—		Non-album singles
"Linda" (with Tito Double P)	2024	11	—	18	—		Incómodo
"El Plumas" (with Luis R Conriquez)	2024	—	—	36	—		Mi Vida Mi Muerte
"Chino" (with Tito Double P)	2024	—	—	—	—		Incómodo
"La Patrulla" (with Peso Pluma)	2024	1	47	3	35	AMPROFON: Diamond+Gold	Éxodo
"Todo a Su Tiempo"	2024	—	—	—	—		Jalense la Greña
"El Gabacho" (with Código FN & Gabito Ballesteros)	2024	—	—	—	—		XV Recargado
"Presidente" (with Gabito Ballesteros, Natanael Cano & Luis R Conriquez)	2024	2	— (Note: "Presidente" did not enter the Billboard Hot 100, but peaked at number four on the Bubbling Under Hot 100 chart.)	9	48		Non-album single
"Loco"	2024	1	43	2	24		Mi Vida Mi Muerte
"Mi Vida Mi Muerte"	2025	15	— (Note: "Mi Vida Mi Muerte" did not enter the Billboard Hot 100, but peaked at number 20 on the Bubbling Under Hot 100 chart.)	22	196		Mi Vida Mi Muerte
"Te Quería Ver" (with Alemán)	2025	1	58	17	25	AMPROFON: 2× Platinum	De Vuelta a las Andadas
"Morena" (with Peso Pluma)	2025	1	83	8	47		Mi Vida Mi Muerte
"Amigos? No." (with Óscar Maydon)	2025	8	—	34	149		Rico o Muerto, Vol. 1
"Hija de Papi" (with Xavi)	2025	—	—	50	—		Non-album single
"Boneless" (with Los Dareyes De La Sierra)	2025	—	—	—	—		Redención
"La Buena Eras Tú" (with Grupo Frontera)	2025	—	—	—	—		Y Lo Que Viene
"Chula Vente" (with Luis R Conriquez and Fuerza Regida)	2025	—	— (Note: "Chula Vente" did not enter the Billboard Hot 100, but peaked at number 10 on the Bubbling Under Hot 100 chart.)	9	62		Meneo
"Pvta Luna"	2025	—	—	10	105		Delirium
"Canasteo" (with Régulo Molina and Óscar Maydon)	2026	—	—	22	172		Non-album singles
"Aguas" (with Luis R Conriquez and Rey Quinto)	2026	—	—	34	—		Non-album singles
"Nalguita & Teta"	2026	—	—	18	127		Non-album singles
"Riki"	2026	—	— (Note: "Riki" did not enter the Billboard Hot 100, but peaked at number 22 on the Bubbling Under Hot 100 chart.)	—	71		Non-album singles
"Olimpo" (with Fuerza Regida)	2026	—	—	—	143		Non-album singles

=== Other charted songs ===
List of other charted songs, with selected chart positions and album name
Title	Year	Peak chart positions				Album
Title	Year	MEX	US Bub.	US Latin	WW	Album
"CDN" (with Luis R. Conriquez)	2025	—	—	42	—	Mi Vida Mi Muerte
"Me Ha Costado" (with Alemán and Victor Mendivil)	2025	25	—	—	—	Mi Vida Mi Muerte
"Chiquita" (with Tito Double P)	2025	22	—	32	—	Mi Vida Mi Muerte
"M&M"	2025	15	7	16	97	Mi Vida Mi Muerte

=== Guest appearances ===
List of non-single guest appearances, with other performing artists, showing year released and album name
Title	Year	Other artist(s)	Album
"El N1 El Perfil o El Chavalón"	2025	Grupo Maximo Grado	Somos Leyenda
"Ebvsy"	2025	Christian Nodal	¿Quién + Como Yo?
"Wiscachos"	2025	Gabito Ballesteros	Ya No Se Llevan Serenatas

== Awards and nominations ==
Year	Award	Category	Nominee / work	Result	Ref.
2026	American Music Awards	Best Latin Album	"Mi Vida Mi Muerte"	Nominated	
2026	American Music Awards	Breakthrough Latin Artist	Himself	Nominated	
