= Te Quería Ver =

2025 single by Alemán and Netón Vega

Single by Alemán and Netón Vega

from the album De Vuelta a las Andadas
- Released: January 31, 2025
- Length: 2:56
- Label: Sony Music Mexico
- Songwriters: Erick Alemán Ramírez; Luis Vega Carvajal
- Producer: Cozy Cuz

Alemán singles chronology
"Close Friends" (2024)	"Te Quería Ver" (2025)	"Clean" (2025)

Netón Vega singles chronology
"Mi Vida Mi Muerte" (2025)	"Te Quería Ver" (2025)	"Morena" (2025)

Music video
- "Te Quería Ver" on YouTube

"Te Quería Ver" is a song by Mexican rapper Alemán and Mexican singer Netón Vega, released on January 31, 2025.

== Background ==
In an interview with The Arizona Republic, Alemán spoke about the collaboration with Netón Vega: "We got together and it came very naturally and it was like, it was the perfect time to bring up the subject. I saw that he had also been doing puros corridos, and I think it was also the perfect time to present this song and be breaking it." On January 9, 2025, the song debuted on the video-sharing platform TikTok, where it went viral and was used in over 100,000 videos. It was also placed on Instagram as the #1 trending sound.

== Charts ==
=== Weekly charts ===
Weekly chart performance for "Te Quería Ver"
Chart (2024–2025)	Peak position
Global 200 (Billboard)	25
Italy (FIMI)	80
Mexico (Billboard)	1
US Billboard Hot 100	58
US Hot Latin Songs (Billboard)	17
US Hot Latin Rhythm Songs (Billboard)	2

=== Year-end charts ===
Year-end chart performance for "Te Quería Ver"
Chart (2025)	Position
Global 200 (Billboard)	115
US Hot Latin Songs (Billboard)	14

== Certifications ==
Region	Certification	Certified units/sales
Mexico (AMPROFON)	2× Diamond+Gold	1,470,000^{‡}
United States (RIAA)	7× Platinum (Latin)	420,000^{‡}
^{‡} Sales+streaming figures based on certification alone.
