= Frecuencia =

2025 song by Los Dareyes de la Sierra

Song by Los Dareyes de la Sierra

from the album Redención
- Released: June 5, 2025
- Genre: Regional Mexican
- Length: 3:10
- Label: Double P
- Songwriters: Darey Castro; Estevan Plazola
- Producers: Pablo Molina; Castro

Music video
- "Frecuencia" on YouTube

"Frecuencia" is a song by Mexican singer Los Dareyes de la Sierra, released on June 5, 2025, from the deluxe edition of his album Redención. It was written by Darey Castro and Estevan Plazola and produced by Pablo Molina and Castro himself.

== Composition ==
Andrea Flores of Los Angeles Times wrote of the song, "The upbeat jingle calls back to Ice Cube's 1993 hit 'It Was a Good Day.' Although paranoid at times, Darey's opening lines are almost hymn-like".

== Charts ==
=== Weekly charts ===
Weekly chart performance for "Frecuencia"
Chart (2025)	Peak position
Global 200 (Billboard)	42
Mexico (Billboard)	3
US Billboard Hot 100	82
US Hot Latin Songs (Billboard)	2

=== Year-end charts ===
Year-end chart performance for "Frecuencia"
Chart (2025)	Position
US Hot Latin Songs (Billboard)	36

== Certifications ==
Region	Certification	Certified units/sales
United States (RIAA)	2× Platinum	2,000,000^{‡}
^{‡} Sales+streaming figures based on certification alone.
