= Incómodo =

Studio album by Tito Double P
- Released: 22 August 2024
- Genres: Regional Mexican, Latin urban
- Length: 59:16
- Language: Spanish
- Label: Double P
- Producers: Tito Double P; Ernesto Fernández; Arturo García; Marcelo Rivera; Peso Pluma; Edgar Barrera; Netón Vega; Darey Castro; Pablo Molina; Jasiel Nuñez; Nick Calleros; Cricket Production; Rabba; Miguel Armenta; Charlie Gtz; Jassiel Ramos; Javi Molina

Tito Double P chronology
Incómodo (2024)	Dinastía (2025)

Singles from Incómodo
- 1. "Dembow Bélico" Released: 2 June 2023; 2. "La 701" Released: 14 July 2023; 3. "Tendido" Released: 6 December 2023; 4. "Linda" Released: 23 May 2024; 5. "Primo" Released: 5 July 2024; 6. "Los Cuadros" Released: 8 August 2024; 7. "Ay Mamá" Released: 22 August 2024; 8. "Detona" Released: 12 September 2024; 9. "El Lokerón" Released: 7 October 2024; 10. "Dos Días" Released: 31 October 2024

Incómodo (Spanish for "Uncomfortable") is the first studio album by Mexican rapper and singer Tito Double P. It was released on 22 August 2024 through Double P Records. At the 26th Annual Latin Grammy Awards the album was nominated for Best Contemporary Mexican Music Album.

== Background and release ==
In June 2024, Tito Double P announced through his social media that he would release the album in August.

== Composition ==
The album is mainly composed of Regional Mexican songs, specifically Sinaloa-style corridos. However, certain tracks represent more urban sounds such as electronic and dembow.

== Singles ==
The first single from the album, "Dembow Bélico", featuring Mexican singers Joel de la P and Luis R. Conriquez, was released on 2 June 2023 and the music video was released on June 21. Is also one of the few songs on the album with a more distinct genre. On July 14, Tito Double P teamed up again with Luis R. Conriquez to release "La 701" as the second single.

On 6 December 2023, the third single "Tendido" was released together with fellow Mexican Gabito Ballesteros.

On 23 May 2024, the fourth single "Linda" was released with fellow Mexican singer Neton Vega, and it is also another of the few songs on the album that are not corridos. Afterwards, it was preceded by the fifth single "Primo" with Natanael Cano, released on July 5. A month later it was preceded by "Los Cuadros" with Peso Pluma, released on August 8, and with whom he had also already collaborated on severe occasions. On August 22, in conjunction with the release of the album, the seventh single "Ay Mamá" was released alongside the Mexican-American band Grupo Frontera. On September 12, in collaboration again with Gabito Ballesteros, the eighth single "Detona" was released. On October 7, the ninth single "El Lokerón" was released, as well as being one of the most popular songs on the album. Weeks later, on October 31, the tenth single "Dos Días" was also released with Peso Pluma.

== Track listing ==
Incómodo track listing
No.	Title	Writer(s)	Producer(s)	Length
1.	"Maravilla"	Jesús Roberto Lajia García; Jorge Jiménez; Miguel Armenta	Tito Double P; Ernesto Fernández; Arturo García	3:19
2.	"Primo" (with Natanael Cano)	Jesús Roberto Lajia García; Diego Millán	Tito Double P; Ernesto Fernández	2:45
3.	"Pajuelazo" (with Luis R. Conriquez)	Jesús Roberto Laija García	Tito Double P; Ernesto Fernández; Arturo García	3:12
4.	"Farandulitas"	Jesús Roberto Lajia García; Daniel Candia	Tito Double P; Ernesto Fernández; Arturo García; Marcelo Rivera	2:46
5.	"5 - 7" (with Junior H)	Jesús Camacho; Jesús Roberto Lajia García; Jorge Jiménez; Miguel Armenta	Tito Double P; Ernesto Fernández; Arturo García	2:55
6.	"Chino" (with Netón Vega)	Luis Ernesto Vega Carvajal	Netón Vega; Tito Double P; Ernesto Fernández	2:55
7.	"El Lokerón"	Jesús Roberto Lajia García; Jesús Camacho; Yahid Roel Tejeda; Juan Manuel Osorio	Tito Double P; Ernesto Fernández; Arturo García	2:26
8.	"Mr. Internacional" (with Los Dareyes de la Sierra)	Esaú Ortíz; Darey Castro; Estevan Plazola	Darey Castro; Ernesto Fernández; Tito Double P; Pablo Molina	3:00
9.	"Ay Mamá" (with Grupo Frontera)	Edgar Barrera; Jesús Roberto Lajia García; Jorge Jiménez; Miguel Armenta; Carlos Anderson	Edgar Barrera; Tito Double P; Ernesto Fernández; Arturo García	2:44
10.	"Detona" (with Gabito Ballesteros)	Esteban Gallegos Frías; Jesús Roberto Lajia García	Tito Double P; Ernesto Fernández; Arturo García; Jasiel Núñez	2:24
11.	"La Bandolera"	Jorge Jiménez	Tito Double P; Ernesto Fernández; Arturo García	3:01
12.	"La Troka" (with Eslabon Armado)	Jesús Roberto Lajia García; Diego Millán; Miguel Armenta; Jonathan Caro	Tito Double P; Ernesto Fernández; Marcelo Rivera	2:24
13.	"Dos Días" (with Peso Pluma)	Miguel Armenta; Jorge Jiménez; Jesús Roberto Lajia García	Tito Double P; Ernesto Fernández; Arturo García	2:34
14.	"Blanca Rosita y María"	Miguel Armenta; Jesús Roberto Lajia García; Estevan Plazola	Tito Double P; Ernesto Fernández; Miguel Armenta	3:21
15.	"Escápate" (with Chino Pacas)	Jesús Roberto Lajia García; Miguel Armenta; Diego Millán; Jonathan Caro	Tito Double P; Ernesto Fernández; Marcelo Rivera	2:25
16.	"Linda" (with Netón Vega)	Jesús Roberto Lajia García; Luis Ernesto Vega Carvajal	Nick Calleros; Ernesto Fernández	3:45
17.	"Dembow Bélico" (with Joel de la P and Luis R. Conriquez)	Jesús Roberto Lajia García; Joel Portillo; Óscar Ernesto Bolivar; Álvaro Venegas; Daniel Ulises Sapién Calleros	Nick Calleros; Cricket Production; Ernesto Fernández	2:07
18.	"Tú Si" (with Armenta)	Miguel Armenta; Jorge Jiménez	Miguel Armenta; Tito Double P; Ernesto Fernández; Arturo García; Rabba; Charlie Gtz	3:02
19.	"La 701" (with Luis R. Conriquez)	Jesús Roberto Laija García	Tito Double P; Javi Molina; Ernesto Fernández	2:45
20.	"Tendido" (with Gabito Ballesteros)	Jesús Roberto Laija García	Tito Double P; Jassiel Ramos; Ernesto Fernández	2:45
21.	"Los Cuadros" (with Peso Pluma)	Hassan Emilio Kabande Lajia; Jesús Roberto Lajia García	Peso Pluma; Tito Double P; Ernesto Fernández	2:41
Total length:				59:16

== Charts ==
=== Weekly charts ===
Weekly chart performance for Incómodo
Chart (2024)	Peak position
US Billboard 200	11
US Regional Mexican Albums (Billboard)	1
US Top Latin Albums (Billboard)	1

=== Year-end charts ===
Year-end chart performance for Incómodo
Chart (2025)	Position
US Billboard 200	36
US Top Latin Albums (Billboard)	2

== Certifications ==
Certifications for Incómodo
Region	Certification	Certified units/sales
Mexico (AMPROFON)	Diamond+2× Platinum	980,000^{‡}
United States (RIAA)	26× Platinum (Latin)	1,560,000^{‡}
^{‡} Sales+streaming figures based on certification alone.
