= El Lokerón =

2024 single by Tito Double P

Single by Tito Double P

from the album Incómodo
- Released: 7 October 2024
- Genre: Regional Mexican; Latin urban
- Length: 2:25
- Label: Double P
- Songwriters: Jesús Roberto Lajia García; Jesús Camacho; Yahid Roel Tejeda; Juan Manuel Osorio
- Producers: Tito Double P; Ernesto Fernández; Arturo García

Tito Double P singles chronology
"Detona" (2024)	"El Lokerón" (2024)	"Dos Días" (2024)

Music video
- "El Lokerón" on YouTube

"El Lokerón" is a song by Mexican rapper Tito Double P from his debut studio album, Incómodo (2024), released as its ninth single on 7 October 2024. It is one of the most popular songs from the album.

== Charts ==
=== Weekly charts ===
Weekly chart performance for "El Lokerón"
Chart (2024)	Peak position
Global 200 (Billboard)	27
Mexico (Billboard)	1
US Billboard Hot 100	73
US Hot Latin Songs (Billboard)	5

=== Year-end charts ===
Year-end chart performance for "El Lokerón"
Chart (2025)	Position
Global 200 (Billboard)	184
US Hot Latin Songs (Billboard)	39
