= Diego de Morón =

Spanish flamenco guitarist (1947–2025)

Diego Torres Amaya (18 April 1947 – 31 August 2025), better known as Diego de Morón, was a Spanish guitarist.

== Life and career ==
De Morón was born in Morón de la Frontera on 18 April 1947. He was the son of singer Luis Torres "Joselero de Morón" and Ángeles Amaya, his family was deeply linked to flamenco. He began accompanying his father in performances and recordings from a young age, which strengthened his early connection with flamenco. In the 1970s, he achieved recognition with his first self-titled album, Diego de Morón (1977). Members of the group Triana collaborated with him.

Throughout his career, de Morón released eight studio albums.

De Morón died on 31 August 2025, at the age of 78.

== Discography ==
- A Diego, Vol. 1 (1975)
- A Diego, Vol. 2 (1975)
- Aire Fresco (single-1977)
- Diego De Morón (LP-1977)
- Diego De Morón (CD-2005)
- Diego. Vivo en Japón (1998)
- Cultura Jonda 21. A Diego el del Gastor, en Morón (1999)
- Diego de Morón". Colección "Flamenco y Universidad - XXXIV (2016)
