= Si No Quieres No =

2024 single by Luis R. Conriquez and Netón Vega

Single by Luis R. Conriquez and Netón Vega
- Released: March 9, 2024
- Genre: Regional Mexican
- Length: 2:27
- Label: Kartel
- Songwriter: Luis Vega
- Producers: Conriquez; Vega; Carlos Santos

Luis R. Conriquez singles chronology
"Ni Tan Diablo Ni Tan Santo" (2024)	"Si No Quieres No" (2024)	"Booty Booty" (2024)

Netón Vega singles chronology
"Los Guzmanez" (2024)	"Si No Quieres No" (2024)	"Sin Ti" (2024)

Music video
- "Si No Quieres No" on YouTube

"Si No Quieres No" (Spanish: "If You Don't Want To, Don’t") is a song by Mexican singers Luis R. Conriquez and Netón Vega, released on March 9, 2024, by Kartel Music. It is the first song of both artists to chart on the Billboard Hot 100, debuting at number 86 and peaking at number 53.

== Background ==
Luis R. Conriquez previewed the song in the podcast Experiencia Regia hosted by La Mole, in which he stated it would not appear on his album Corridos Bélicos, Vol. IV because he considered it already good enough to be a single.

According to Luminate, the song amassed 7.9 million official streams in the United States in the May 3–9 tracking week.

== Charts ==
=== Weekly charts ===
Weekly chart performance for "Si No Quieres No"
Chart (2024)	Peak position
Global 200 (Billboard)	34
Mexico (Billboard)	1
US Billboard Hot 100	53
US Hot Latin Songs (Billboard)	2

=== Year-end charts ===
Year-end chart performance for "Si No Quieres No"
Chart (2024)	Position
Global 200 (Billboard)	138
US Hot Latin Songs (Billboard)	7

== Certifications ==
Certifications for "Si No Quieres No"
Region	Certification	Certified units/sales
United States (RIAA)	3× Platinum (Latin)	180,000^{‡}
^{‡} Sales+streaming figures based on certification alone.
