= Passo Bem Solto =

2024 song by ATLXS

Single by ATLXS
- Released: 23 April 2024
- Genre: Brazilian phonk
- Length: 1:43 (original)
- Label: Broke
- Songwriter: Diego Basile
- Producer: ATLXS

ATLXS singles chronology
"Passo Bem Solto" (2024)	"Hypnotic" (2025)

Audio sample
- "Passo Bem Solto (Slowed)": file; help

"Passo Bem Solto" is a Brazilian phonk song by the Italian music producer Diego Basile, known professionally as ATLXS. He self-released it on 23 April 2024, and later signed with Broke Records in January 2025 to re-release it the next month. "Passo Bem Solto" was commercially successful, charting in multiple countries and being certified platinum in France and Portugal. In year-end charts, it finished number 5 on Billboard's Hot Dance/Electronic Songs and 152 on the Global 200.

== Background and release ==
ATLXS is the pseudonym of the Italian music producer Diego Basile. He self-released "Passo Bem Solto" on 23 April 2024, including four versions at different playback speeds. In January 2025, ATLXS signed a contract with Broke Records, an indie label focused on "identifying viral songs and turning them into streaming hits". He signed over the masters and publishing rights of "Passo Bem Solto", and it was re-released on 18 February. In March, he released three other versions of it at slower speeds. A remix by Meduza was released in August. In October, ATLXS sued Broke Records after the label refused to terminate the contract; according to ATLXS's lawyer, the deal was "predatory" and, as ATLXS was 17 years old at the time, the contract could be made void according to California law.

== Reception and commercial performance ==
Billboard Brasil's "Yuri da BS" criticized "Passo Bem Solto", calling it "a European distortion of São Paulo's mandelão" and suggesting that it amounted to "classic appropriation". By October 2025, "Passo Bem Solto" had over 450 million streams on Spotify across its multiple versions. "Passo Bem Solto (Slowed)" was the second top song in YouTube Shorts for 2025.

"Passo Bem Solto" was ATLXS's first entry in a Billboard chart, reaching number 3 on Hot Dance/Electronic Songs. It reached number 4 in the magazine's World Digital Song Sales and 34 on its Global 200 chart. It reached the top 20 in numerous national charts, including Austria, Latvia Streaming, Lithuania, Luxembourg, Middle East and North Africa, Russia Streaming, Switzerland, Ukraine Airplay, and the United Arab Emirates. It also reached a peak position of 2 on India International Streaming. In year-end charts, it finished number 5 on Hot Dance/Electronic Songs and 152 on the Global 200. "Passo Bem Solto" was certified platinum in France and Portugal; gold in New Zealand, Spain, and the United States; and silver in the United Kingdom.

== Track listing ==
"Passo Bem Solto" single

- "Passo Bem Solto" – 1:43
- "Passo Bem Solto" (Sped Up) – 1:32
- "Passo Bem Solto" (Slowed) – 1:56
- "Passo Bem Solto" (Super Sped Up) – 1:26
- "Passo Bem Solto" (Super Slowed) – 2:02

"Passo Bem Solto" (Versions)

- "Passo Bem Solto" (Ultra Slowed) – 2:17
- "Passo Bem Solto" (Mega Slowed) – 2:26
- "Passo Bem Solto" (Extreme Slowed) – 2:43

Meduza remix

- "Passo Bem Solto" (Meduza Remix) – 4:23

== Charts ==
=== Weekly charts ===
Weekly chart performance
Chart (2025)	Peak position
Austria (Ö3 Austria Top 40)	17
Belgium (Ultratop 50 Wallonia)	45
Brazil (Brasil Hot 100)	43
France (SNEP)	48
Global 200 (Billboard)	34
India International Streaming (IMI)	2
Israel (Mako Hitlist)	65
Italy (FIMI)	78
Latvia Streaming (LaIPA)	14
Lithuania (AGATA)	18
Luxembourg (Billboard)	15
Middle East and North Africa (IFPI)	18
Netherlands (Single Top 100)	64
Norway (VG-lista)	69
Poland (Polish Streaming Top 100)	31
Portugal (AFP)	27
Russia Streaming (TopHit)	9
Sweden (Sverigetopplistan)	98
Switzerland (Schweizer Hitparade)	6
Ukraine Airplay (TopHit)	15
United Arab Emirates (IFPI)	15
UK Singles (Official Charts)	67
UK Dance (Official Charts)	13
UK Indie (Official Charts)	19
US Hot Dance/Electronic Songs (Billboard)	3
US World Digital Song Sales (Billboard)	4
Vietnam (Vietnam Hot 100)	54

=== Monthly charts ===
Monthly chart performance
Chart (2025)	Position
Brazil Streaming (Pro-Música Brasil)	33
Russia Streaming (TopHit)	9
Ukraine Airplay (TopHit)	25

=== Year-end charts ===
Year-end chart performance
Chart (2025)	Position
Austria (Ö3 Austria Top 40)	64
Belgium (Ultratop 50 Wallonia)	190
Global 200 (Billboard)	152
India International (IMI)	14
Switzerland (Schweizer Hitparade)	50
US Hot Dance/Electronic Songs (Billboard)	5

== Certifications ==
Certifications and sales
Region	Certification	Certified units/sales
France (SNEP)	Platinum	200,000^{‡}
Italy (FIMI)	Gold	100,000^{‡}
New Zealand (RMNZ)	Gold	15,000^{‡}
Portugal (AFP)	Platinum	25,000^{‡}
Spain (Promusicae)	Gold	50,000^{‡}
United Kingdom (BPI)	Silver	200,000^{‡}
United States (RIAA)	Gold	500,000^{‡}
^{‡} Sales+streaming figures based on certification alone.
