= Amalia Macías =

Mexican singer and actress (1934–2025)

Background information
- Born: 22 March 1934; Irapuato, Guanajuato, Mexico
- Died: 24 July 2025 (aged 91)
- Genres: Ranchera
- Occupations: Singer, actress
- Instrument: Vocals
- Years active: 1947–2025
- Labels: Peerless; Melody; Hit

Amalia Macías (Spanish: [aˈmalja maˈsias]; 22 March 1934 – 24 July 2025) was a Mexican singer and actress of stage, radio, film and television. In the 1970s and 1980s, she toured Europe singing Mexican songs.

== Life and career ==
Macías was born in Irapuato, Guanajuato, Mexico. She began her career at the age of 13, winning an amateur contest at Irapuato's Cine Rialto with her interpretation of the song "Dos arbolitos". Her prize consisted of a box of Lerma soda and a pass to watch movies for free for a year.

In a troupe that passed through Irapuato, she met the singer Luis Pérez Meza, who advised her to relocate to Mexico City to make her professional debut as a ranchera singer. She had to convince her strict mother to allow her to go.

In Mexico City, the famous quartet Los Tecolines helped her get a record deal with Peerless Records, where she recorded her first hit single, "Si volviera a nacer", which allowed her to sing on radio and tour the country. She made her television debut in Música, risa y estrellas with other new singers, such as Irma Serrano, Lucha Moreno, José Juan, and Juan Gallardo.

Macías made her film debut with a starring role in El tigre de Santa Julia (1974) and also sang several songs in the film.

In 1982, she decided to finance a tour of Spain to "show what Mexico is". With the money she earned singing in California, she hired Pepe López's Mariachi México 70 as her musical accompaniment. Before she left for Spain, Mexican journalist Jacobo Zabludovsky interviewed her and gave her television programs to promote her tour of Spain. She sang in the Spanish cities of Bilbao, Zaragoza, Torremolinos, Marbella, Madrid, and Barcelona.

Macías died on 24 July 2025, at the age of 91.

== Discography ==
- Para puras vergüenzas contigo
- Ay! mi gordo
- Amalia Macías

== Filmography ==
- El tigre de Santa Julia (1974)
