= Loco (Netón Vega song) =

2024 single by Netón Vega

Single by Netón Vega

from the album Mi Vida Mi Muerte
- Released: 20 December 2024
- Genre: Reggaeton
- Length: 3:06
- Label: Josa
- Songwriter: Luis Ernesto Vega Carvajal
- Producers: Netón Vega; L. Prince; Josefat Chavez; Nick Calleros

Netón Vega singles chronology
"Presidente" (2024)	"Loco" (2024)	"Mi Vida Mi Muerte" (2025)

Music video
- "Loco" on YouTube

"Loco" is a song by Mexican singer-songwriter Netón Vega, released on 20 December 2024 as the second single from his debut studio album, Mi Vida Mi Muerte (2025). It is his first song of the reggaeton genre and his highest-charting song.

== Background ==
In an interview with Remezcla, Netón Vega stated:

Although my roots are in corridos, I have always had a great admiration for reggaeton, its energy, and the connection it creates. I wanted to experiment and show that I can tell stories with a different rhythm without losing my essence. "Loco" is proof that music has no limits and that an artist can move between genres.

== Charts ==
=== Weekly charts ===
Weekly chart performance for "Loco"
Chart (2025)	Peak position
Global 200 (Billboard)	24
Mexico (Billboard)	2
US Billboard Hot 100	43
US Hot Latin Songs (Billboard)	2
US Billboard Hot Latin Rhythm Songs	3

=== Year-end charts ===
Year-end chart performance for "Loco"
Chart (2025)	Position
Global 200 (Billboard)	128
US Billboard Hot 100	100
US Hot Latin Songs (Billboard)	7
