= Carlos Schvartzman =

Paraguayan musician (1947–2025)

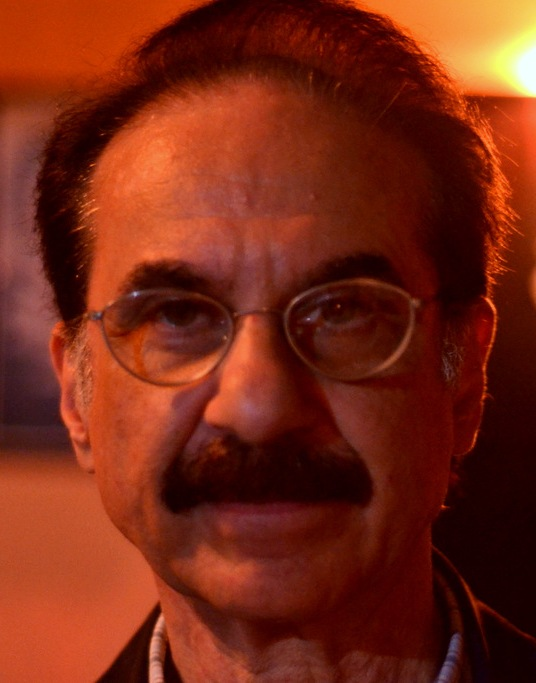
- Born: November 4, 1947; Asunción, Paraguay
- Died: June 28, 2025 (aged 77)
- Known for: Musician, composer, pianist, guitarist

Carlos Schvartzman (November 4, 1947 – June 28, 2025) was a Paraguayan pianist, guitarist, composer, arranger and orchestrator of jazz and contemporary music. He was born and raised in Asunción, the capital of Paraguay. He was also involved in pop music, writing orchestral arrangements for soloists, vocal groups, music for TV, advertising jingles, and occasionally a classic style music with modern harmony of the 20th century. He participated as a conductor, arranger, and composer for international song festivals (such as Viña del Mar, during the 1970s). He was regarded as one of the most notable musicians in the country.

Schvartzman was born in Asunción on November 4, 1947, into a family of Ukrainian-Jewish background, and died on June 28, 2025, at the age of 77, following a long illness arising from a kidney complaint.
