= Mango Dragon Fruit =

Studio album by Sérgio Britto
- Released: May 8, 2025
- Genre: Bossa nova · pop · Brazilian popular music
- Length: 37:01
- Label: Midas Music

Mango Dragon Fruit is the sixth solo album by Brazilian musician Sérgio Britto, released by Midas Music on May 8, 2025, which blends elements of bossa nova, pop, and Brazilian popular music.

== Background ==
In his sixth solo album, musician Sérgio Britto, from the rock band Titãs, sought to bring elements outside the musical genre that made him famous, seeking to bring elements of bossa nova, pop, and Brazilian popular music. Released by Midas Music, located in Jardim São Bento in São Paulo, the album was released on May 8, 2025, and the name of the album is inspired by the Mango Dragon Fruit drink from the American chain Starbucks, which is his daughter's favorite drink.

The album featured several Brazilian musicians. In an interview with Billboard Brasil, he said that the idea of calling Ed Motta came about when “We met on Serginho Groisman’s show [Altas Horas] and he commented to me about a harmonic passage in ‘Enquanto Houver Sol.’ We started talking, we talked about Rita Lee, who composed with Ed and participated in my album. It turned out to be something like the 1940s [...]. I don't follow everything he says or talks about. But I know his music, and Ed deserves respect for the talented artist that he is." Britto also recorded a composition by Rita that was almost unheard of on the album. Although it was never officially recorded, there is an informal recording of the singer and her husband, Roberto de Carvalho, rehearsing the song in the studio. The song “Eu Sou do Tempo” is nostalgic for the country of Rádio Nacional, communist hippies, carnival marches, and Nara Leão and Elis Regina.

Britto also invited musician Roberto Menescal to sing the song O Barquinho, a bossa nova classic composed by Menescal and Ronaldo Bôscoli for singer Maysa. The album also features musicians Bebel Gilberto, Fernanda Takai, and Brothers of brazil —a duo formed by brothers Supla and João Suplicy.

== Track listing ==
No.	Title	Writer(s)	Notes	Length
1.	"Viver de Ilusão"	Sérgio Britto	feat. Tamara Salles	2:58
2.	"Problemática com Estilo"	Sérgio Britto	feat. Ed Motta	3:33
3.	"Bastava Querer"	Sérgio Britto		3:38
4.	"Mango Dragon Fruit"	Sérgio Britto	feat. Bebel Gilberto	3:55
5.	"Eu Sou do Tempo"	Rita Lee, Roberto de Carvalho		2:29
6.	"Chequerê"	Sinhô		3:32
7.	"Pra Vida Inteira"	Sérgio Britto		3:29
8.	"E Não se Fala Mais"	Sérgio Britto	feat. Fernanda Takai	2:40
9.	"Tarsila"	Sérgio Britto		2:18
10.	"O Barquinho"	Roberto Menescal, Ronaldo Bôscoli	feat. Roberto Menescal	2:53
11.	"Teca"	Sérgio Britto		3:09
12.	"Bons Tempos Chatos"	Sérgio Britto	feat. Brothers of Brazil	2:26
Total length:				37:01

== Reception ==
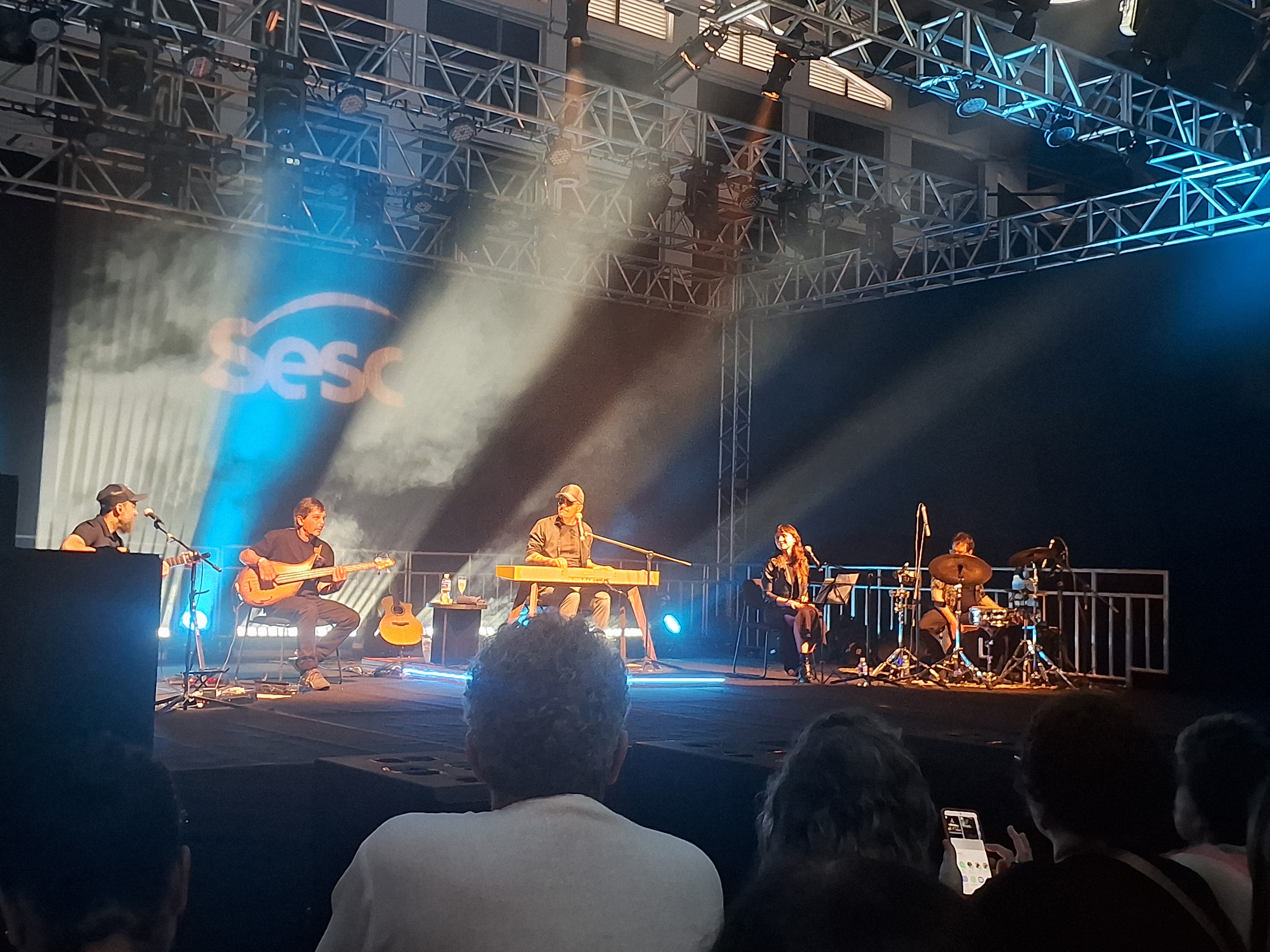
Sérgio Britto show at SESC Campinas for the launch of the album Mango Dragon Fruit

=== Critical ===
Felipe Santa Cruz, writing for Veja magazine, gave the album a positive review, describing some songs as “Problemática com Estilo" e,” which he classified as “fun,” and “Não Se Fala Mais Nisso”, where he drew attention to “the song's striking piano.”

=== Tour ===
The album launch tour included performances in several cities across the country, including São Paulo, Campinas, Araraquara, Guarulhos, Passo Fundo, Mogi das Cruzes, São José do Rio Preto, and Porto Alegre.
