= La Diabla (Xavi song) =

Single by Xavi

from the album Next
- Language: Spanish
- English title: "She-Devil"
- Released: November 30, 2023
- Genre: Regional Mexican; urban sierreño; ranchera
- Length: 2:52
- Label: Interscope
- Songwriters: Joshua Xavier Gutiérrez; Alex Hernández; Fabio Gutiérrez
- Producer: Ernesto Fernández

Xavi singles chronology
"Modo DND" (2023)	"La Diabla" (2023)	"Corazón de Piedra" (2024)

Music video
- "La Diabla" on YouTube

"La Diabla" is a song by the American singer Xavi, and was released as a single through Interscope on November 30, 2023. The song was written by Xavi alongside Alex Hernández and Fabio Gutiérrez, with Ernesto Fernández handling its production.

The song gained a huge amount of traction on the social media platform TikTok, becoming the second of the Xavi's two breakthrough singles, the first being "La Víctima". Commercially, the song peaked within the top five in numerous Latin charts, including the top spot in Mexico, and has peaked at number 20 on the Billboard Hot 100, as of February 15, 2024.

== Commercial performance ==
"La Diabla" debuted at number 76 on the Billboard Hot 100 on the issue dated December 30, 2023, rising to number 62 one week later. Weeks later, the song reached its peak of number 20 in its sixth week on the chart, on the issue dated February 3, 2024. The song also peaked at number 3 on the Billboard Global 200 and number 2 on the Billboard Global Excl. US chart. In the US Hot Latin Songs chart, the song debuted at number 30 in the week ending on 16 December 2023, and would top the chart two weeks later, dethroning "Monaco" by Bad Bunny. "La Diabla" would also reach the top five in several countries' charts.

In the Mexico Songs chart, the song debuted at number 22, eventually topping the chart in the week ending on December 30, 2023. The song stayed atop the chart for thirteen consecutive weeks, becoming the longest running solo number-one hit and tying with "Lady Gaga" by Peso Pluma, Gabito Ballesteros and Junior H for the song with the most cumulative weeks at number-one.

== Live performances ==
On February 10, 2024, Xavi would perform the song and "La Víctima" in Estadio Azteca as a special guest on Karol G's Mañana Será Bonito Tour.

== Charts ==
=== Weekly charts ===
Weekly chart performance for "La Diabla"
Chart (2023–2024)	Peak position
Bolivia (Billboard)	3
Chile (Billboard)	15
Colombia (Billboard)	2
Costa Rica (Monitor Latino)	14
Ecuador (Billboard)	2
El Salvador (Monitor Latino)	6
Global 200 (Billboard)	3
Guatemala (Monitor Latino)	5
Mexico (Billboard)	1
Peru (Billboard)	12
US Billboard Hot 100	20
US Hot Latin Songs (Billboard)	1
US Latin Airplay (Billboard)	1
US Regional Mexican Airplay (Billboard)	1

=== Year-end charts ===
2024 year-end chart performance for "La Diabla"
Chart (2024)	Position
Global 200 (Billboard)	59
US Billboard Hot 100	72
US Hot Latin Songs (Billboard)	3
US Latin Airplay (Billboard)	16
US Regional Mexican Airplay (Billboard)	5

== See also ==
- List of Latin songs on the Billboard Hot 100
- List of Billboard Hot Latin Songs and Latin Airplay number ones of 2024
