= Morena (Netón Vega and Peso Pluma song) =

2025 single by Netón Vega and Peso Pluma

Single by Netón Vega and Peso Pluma

from the album Mi Vida Mi Muerte
- Released: February 14, 2025
- Length: 3:13
- Label: Josa
- Songwriter: Luis Vega Carvajal
- Producers: Netón Vega; L. Prince; Josefat Chavez; Edson Jassiel Ramos Noriega

Netón Vega singles chronology
"Te Quería Ver" (2025)	"Morena" (2025)

Peso Pluma singles chronology
"Bandida" (2025)	"Morena" (2025)	"Alley Oop" (2025)

Music video
- "Morena" on YouTube

"Morena" is a song by Mexican singers Netón Vega and Peso Pluma, released on February 14, 2025 as the fourth single from the former's debut studio album, Mi Vida Mi Muerte, which was released on the same day.

== Background ==
In an interview with Billboard, Netón Vega revealed some details behind the song's creation:

This song was born at a live event where I intended to record with Tito Double P, but for one reason or another, I couldn't do it with him. I wrote this song while I was in a car. Later I showed it to Peso, who liked it from the first moment. At first, the song had a different direction, but it turned out very good."

Peso Pluma also asked him to choose the song as the next single for Mi Vida Mi Muerte, to which Vega agreed.

== Composition ==
"Morena" is a corridos tumbados song. Netón Vega described it as a "corrido with classic requinto and a lot of ambiance."

== Charts ==
=== Weekly charts ===
Weekly chart performance for "Morena"
Chart (2025–2026)	Peak position
El Salvador Anglo Airplay (Monitor Latino) Remix version	5
Global 200 (Billboard)	47
Honduras Anglo Airplay (Monitor Latino) Remix version	6
Mexico (Billboard)	1
Nicaragua Anglo Airplay (Monitor Latino) Remix version	3
US Billboard Hot 100	83
US Hot Latin Songs (Billboard)	8
US Hot Regional Mexican Songs (Billboard)	2

=== Year-end charts ===
Year-end chart performance for "Morena"
Chart (2025)	Position
Global 200 (Billboard)	143
US Hot Latin Songs (Billboard)	18
