= Dharío Primero =

Dominican singer (1952–2025)

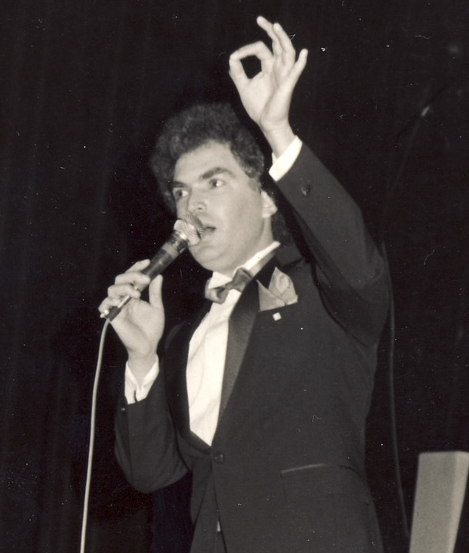
Image of Dhario Primero

Dharío Primero (December 27, 1952 – May 14, 2025), better known as Dharío Primero, was a Dominican singer.

Primero is considered one of the first singers to venture into ballads in the Dominican Republic.

== Life and career ==
Primero was born on December 27, 1952 in Santiago de los Caballeros. Throughout his career, he recorded 15 studio albums.

Primero died in Orlando, Florida on May 14, 2025, at the age of 72, suffering from lung cancer and heart problems.
