= La Patrulla =

Single by Peso Pluma and Netón Vega

from the album Éxodo
- Language: Spanish
- Released: 5 September 2024
- Genre: Corrido tumbado
- Length: 2:10
- Label: Double P
- Songwriter: Luis Ernesto Vega Carvajal
- Producers: Ernesto Fernández; Jesus Iván Leal Reyes "Parka"; Peso Pluma

Peso Pluma singles chronology
"Se Te Nota" (2024)	"La Patrulla" (2024)	"Dos Días" (2024)

Netón Vega singles chronology
"El Plumas" (2024)	"La Patrulla" (2024)	"Todo a Su Tiempo" (2024)

Music video
- "La Patrulla" on YouTube

"La Patrulla" (transl. "The Patrol") is song by Mexican singers Peso Pluma and Netón Vega. It was initially released on 20 June 2024, through Double P Records, as the third track from the former's fourth studio album Éxodo, later released as a single on 5 September 2024.

== Background ==
The song was written by Luis Ernesto "Netón" Vega, who was introduced to Kabande through Tito Double P, and was produced by Karande, Ernesto Fernández, and Iván Reyes. Its lyrics follow a typical corrido-tumbado narrative, depicting a rise from humble beginnings to success. The song reflects on the protagonists’ journey and the dangerous situations they have survived.

== Accolades ==
Awards and nominations for "La Patrulla"
Organization	Year	Category	Result	Ref.
MTV Video Music Awards	2025	Best Latin	Pending	

== Charts ==
=== Weekly charts ===
Chart performance for "La Patrulla"
Chart (2024)	Peak position
Global 200 (Billboard)	35
Mexico (Billboard)	1
US Billboard Hot 100	47
US Hot Latin Songs (Billboard)	2

=== Year-end charts ===
Year-end chart performance for "La Patrulla"
Chart (2024)	Position
US Hot Latin Songs (Billboard)	17
Chart (2025)	Position
US Hot Latin Songs (Billboard)	41

== Certifications ==
Certifications for "La Patrulla"
Region	Certification	Certified units/sales
Mexico (AMPROFON)	Diamond+Gold	770,000^{‡}
United States (RIAA)	51× Platinum (Latin)	3,060,000^{‡}
^{‡} Sales+streaming figures based on certification alone.
