= Xavi (singer) =

American singer (born 2003/04)

- Born: Joshua Xavier Gutierrez; May 5, 2004 (age 22); Phoenix, Arizona, U.S.
- Occupations: Singer; songwriter
- Musical career
- Genres: Regional Mexican; urban sierreño; corridos tumbados
- Instruments: Vocals; guitar
- Years active: 2020–present
- Label: Interscope
- Website: xaviofficial.com

Joshua Xavier Gutierrez (born May 5, 2004), known professionally as Xavi, is an American singer-songwriter of regional Mexican music, who rose to prominence in 2023 through his singles "La Víctima" and "La Diabla", which went viral on TikTok and led to the singer's debut on the Billboard Hot 100. Between the release of these two solo singles, he also released the collaborations "Poco a Poco" with Los Dareyes de la Sierra and "Modo DND" with Tony Aguirre, which also performed well on the charts.

== Life and career ==
Joshua Xavier Gutierrez was born in Phoenix, Arizona and raised between there and Nogales, Sonora. He started playing the guitar at the age of 10 and began writing songs at 12. Gutierrez embarked on his musical career in 2020 with the release of his debut single "Vete Ya", through Baga Music. He has cited acts such as Camila and Sin Bandera as early inspirations. As he released more of his work to the public, he attracted the attention of Interscope Records, who signed a record deal with him after his song "Amigos con Derecho" went viral. Gutierrez was injured in a car accident shortly after signing, which resulted in a facial and skull fracture. Due to these injuries, he was initially told he would no longer be able to sing. However, videos of Gutierrez singing and playing guitar in his hospital bed surfaced around social media, and he made a full recovery from his injuries. Following his recovery, in early 2022, he changed his musical style to tumbados románticos, which are corridos tumbados with lyrical themes revolving around romance. He marked this change by releasing several singles in this newly adopted style.

In May 2023, Xavi released his debut EP My Mom's Playlist, which features covers of songs such as Maná's "Rayando el Sol". In August 2023, he released "La Víctima", which became his breakthrough single with runaway popularity on TikTok. In December 2023, the song debuted at number 24 on the US Billboard Hot Latin Songs chart, later reaching the top 10. Following the runaway success of "La Víctima", he released two collaborative singles—"Poco a Poco" with Los Dareyes de la Sierra and "Modo DND" with Tony Aguirre—which also charted in the United States. Later that month, he released the single "La Diabla", which debuted on the Billboard Hot 100 at number 76, peaking at number 20 and becoming his second breakthrough single. The single also charted throughout Latin America and topped the US Hot Latin Songs chart, peaking at number 3 on the Billboard Global 200, and topping Spotify's Global chart. "La Diabla" eventually became the longest-running number-one Latin song on Spotify's Global chart.

In 2024, Xavi announced his first tour, the Poco a Poco Tour, along with its dates in the spring, starting in Mexico City and Guadalajara, with later dates in cities in the Western United States.

In October 2024, Xavi released his debut studio album, Next, with label Interscope. The album was number 77 on Rolling Stone's Best 100 Albums of 2024 list, with music journalist Tomás Mier observing that: "[Next] continues the 20-year-old’s mission of staying true to the genre's roots while incorporating new sounds and skipping predictable chains and money lyrics to tell stories of love and heartbreak." Next features all of Xavi's most popular singles, including "La Víctima," "La Diabla," "Poco a Poco," and "Modo DND."

== Discography ==
=== Studio albums ===
List of albums, with selected chart positions, and album name
Title	Details	Peak chart positions
Title	Details	US
Next	Released: October 11, 2024; Label: Interscope; Formats: Digital download, streaming	128
Dosis	Released: May 21, 2026; Label: Interscope; Formats: Digital download, streaming	100

=== Extended plays ===
List of extended plays, with selected details
Title	Details
My Mom's Playlist	Released: May 10, 2023; Label: Interscope; Formats: Digital download, streaming

=== Singles ===
List of singles, with selected chart positions, and album name
Title	Year	Peak chart positions							Certifications	Album
Title	Year	US	US Latin	BOL	COL	ECU	MEX	WW	Certifications	Album
"Vete Ya"	2020	—	—	—	—	—	—	—		Non-album singles
"En La 29 (En Vivo)" (featuring Banda la Alterada)	2020	—	—	—	—	—	—	—		Non-album singles
"Te Quiero"	2021	—	—	—	—	—	—	—		Non-album singles
"Si Me Ven"	2021	—	—	—	—	—	—	—		Non-album singles
"Ojitos del Miel"	2021	—	—	—	—	—	—	—		Non-album singles
"Amigos con Derecho"	2021	—	—	—	—	—	—	—		Non-album singles
"Quiero Contarte"	2022	—	—	—	—	—	—	—		Non-album singles
"Se Chambiar" (with Clave 520)	2022	—	—	—	—	—	—	—		Non-album singles
"Zero Sentimientos" (with Eduardo Soto)	2022	—	—	—	—	—	—	—		Non-album singles
"Te Mereces a Mi"	2022	—	—	—	—	—	—	—		Non-album singles
"Santa Claus Llegó a la Ciudad"	2022	—	—	—	—	—	—	—		Non-album singles
"Aquí Estoy" (with Eduardo Soto)	2023	—	—	—	—	—	—	—		Non-album singles
"Solo Recuerdos" (with Los Aptos)	2023	—	—	—	—	—	—	—		Non-album singles
"Rayando el Sol"	2023	—	—	—	—	—	—	—		My Mom's Playlist
"Sin Pagar Renta"	2023	—	34	—	—	—	—	—	RIAA: 3× Platinum (Latin)	Non-album single
"La Víctima"	2023	46	3	14	7	6	2	10	RIAA: 18× Platinum (Latin)	Next
"Poco a Poco" (with Los Dareyes de la Sierra)	2023	— (Note: "Poco a Poco" did not enter the Billboard Hot 100, but peaked at number six on the Bubbling Under Hot 100 chart.)	16	—	—	—	10	100	RIAA: 9× Platinum (Latin)	Next
"Modo DND" (with Tony Aguirre)	2023	— (Note: "Modo DND" did not enter the Billboard Hot 100, but peaked at number 23 on the Bubbling Under Hot 100 chart.)	21	—	—	—	14	163	RIAA: 7× Platinum (Latin)	Next
"La Diabla"	2023	20	1	3	2	2	1	3	RIAA: 25× Platinum (Latin); RIAA: Gold	Next
"Corazón de Piedra"	2024	73	4	—	—	—	3	43		Next
"Ya Te Superé" (with Tony Aguirre)	2024	—	—	—	—	—	—	—		Non-album singles
"OOTD"	2024	—	—	—	—	—	—	—		Non-album singles
"Una Semana"	2024	—	—	—	—	—	—	—		Next
"SRT" (with Fuerza Regida)	2024	—	—	—	—	—	—	—		Dosis
"En Privado" (with Manuel Turizo)	2025	— (Note: "En Privado" did not enter the Billboard Hot 100, but peaked at number 4 on the Bubbling Under Hot 100 chart.)	11	—	—	—	—	90		Dosis
"Hija de Papi" (with Netón Vega)	2025	—	—	—	—	—	—	—		Dosis
"Mírame Feliz" (with Belinda)	2025	—	—	—	—	—	—	—		Indómita
"El Malo"	2025	—	—	—	—	—	—	—		Dosis
"La del Primer Puesto" (with Reik)	2025	—	—	—	—	—	—	—		TQ+
"Bien Pedos" (with Kapo)	2025	—	—	—	—	—	—	—		Dosis
"Niña Mala" (with Omar Montes)	2025	—	—	—	—	—	—	—		Dosis
"No Capea" (with Grupo Frontera)	2025	—	13	—	—	—	12	—		Dosis
"Cartier" (with Gabito Ballesteros)	2025	—	—	—	—	—	—	—		Dosis
"No Voy A Cambiar" (with Codiciado)	2025	—	—	—	—	—	—	—		Non-album singles
"La Fkn Vibra" (with Sebastián Yatra)	2025	—	—	—	—	—	—	—		Non-album singles
"La Morrita" (with Carín León)	2026	—	—	—	—	—	—	—		Dosis
"Me Voy A La C******a" (with Yandel)	2026	—	—	—	—	—	—	—		Infinito
"Aguántame" (with Banda MS)	2026	—	—	—	—	—	—	—		Non-album singles
"Somos Más" (with Carlos Vives, Emilia & Wisin)	2026	—	—	—	—	—	—	—		Non-album singles
"San Charly" (with Esaú Ortiz & Alan Arrieta)	2026	—	—	—	—	—	—	—		Dosis
"50/50" (with El Bogueto)	2026	—	—	—	—	—	—	—		Eso Si Es de Gangster
"Vengache Pa' Aca" (with Edgardo Nuñez)	2026	—	—	—	—	—	—	—		Non-album singles
"Mr. Lonely" (with L. Prince & Rey Quinto)	2026	—	—	—	—	—	—	—		Non-album singles
"Find Us Again"	2026	—	—	—	—	—	—	—		Dosis
"Pensando En Ti" (with De La Rose)	2026	—	—	—	—	—	—	—		TBD
"Se Me Amanece" (with Codiciado)	2026	—	—	—	—	—	—	—		TBD
"HD" (with Lenin Ramírez)	2026	—	—	—	—	—	—	—		TBD
"Nadie Te Extraña"	2026	—	—	—	—	—	—	—		TBD

=== Guest appearances ===
Title	Year	Other artist(s)	Album
"3 AM"	2023	Los Primos del Este	Amor de Lejos
"Cuando Me Ocupes"	2025	Netón Vega	Mi Vida Mi Muerte
"Déjese Querer"	2026	La Adictiva	TBD
"Malas Mañas"	2026	Kenia Os	TBD

== Tours ==
=== Headlining tour ===
- Poco a Poco Tour (2024)
- X-Tour (2025-2026)

== Awards ==
- 2024 Premios Juventud: New Generation – Regional Mexican Music, for himself
- 2024 Premios Juventud: Best Regional Mexican song, for "La Diabla"
- 2026 Latin Grammy Awards: Best Contemporary Mexican Music Album, for Dosis
- 2026 Latin Grammy Awards: Best Regional Mexican Song for "No Capea" with Grupo Frontera
