= Alemán (rapper) =

Mexican rapper

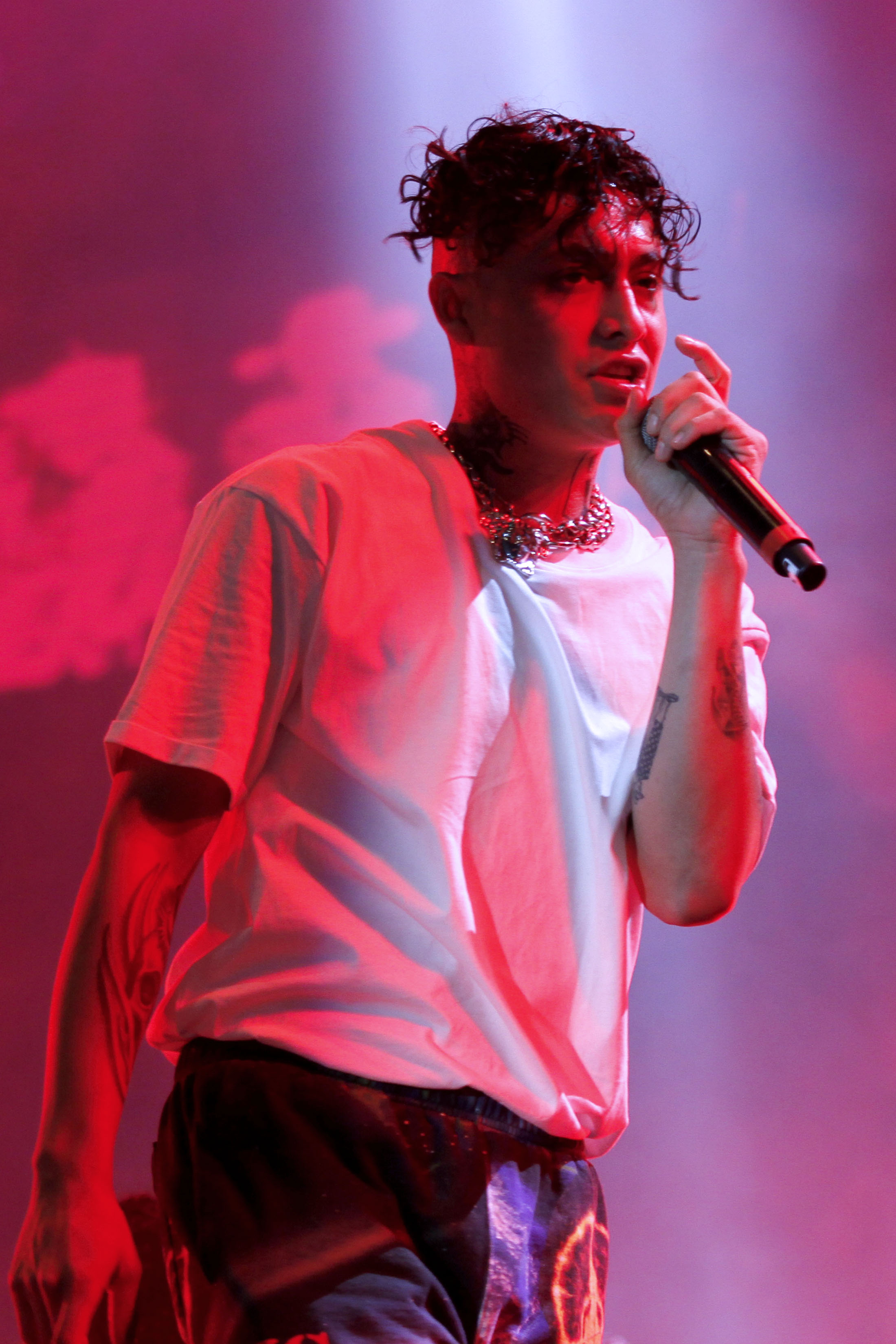

Background information
- Born: Erick Raúl Alemán Ramírez; February 20, 1990 (age 36); Cabo San Lucas, Baja California Sur, Mexico
- Genres: Latin trap, boom bap
- Occupation: Rapper
- Years active: 2009–present
- Label: Sony Music Mexico

Erick Raúl Alemán Ramírez (born February 20, 1990), known professionally as Alemán (Spanish pronunciation: [aleˈman]), is a Mexican rapper.

Alemán was born and raised in Cabo San Lucas. His solo career began in 2014 on the Homegrown label with his first album Pase de abordar ("Boarding Pass"). His penultimate album, Eclipse, achieved international success, receiving touring support in Mexico, Chile, Argentina, and Spain.

A 2017 article on Mexican rap by Noisey France which highlighted his collaboration with Yoga Fire, "Chapo Guzmán", was later mentioned in a Red Bull promotional piece stating him to be "considered one of the best Spanish-language rappers".

== Musical influences ==
Alemán grew up listening to 2Pac, Notorious B.I.G., Dr. Dre, 50 Cent, Control Machete, Cartel de Santa, Cypress Hill, Psycho Realm, Terma H Muda, Muelas de Gallo, Elote El Bárbaro, Caballeros del Plan G, El Pinche Brujo, Snoop Dogg, Akwid, Ice Cube and Eminem. His father's love of hip hop inspired Alemán to make his own music, his father was a Breakdancer.

== Discography ==
- Pase de Abordar (2015)
- Rolemos Otro (2016)
- Eclip$e (2018)
- Humo En La Trampa (2019)
- Humo En La Trampa 2 (2020)
- Humo En La Trampa 3 (2021)
- Huracán (2021)
- Haciéndolo Fino (2023)
- Confesiones (2024)
- Rich mafia vol.1 (2024)
- De Vuelta a las Andadas (2025)
- Mi Droga (2026)

== Awards and nominations ==
=== Berlin Music Video Awards ===
The Berlin Music Video Awards is an international festival that promotes the art of music videos.

Year	Nominated work	Award	Result	Ref.
2025	"Como Pacman"	Best Concept	Nominated	
