= Mexico Songs =

Mexican music chart

Mexico Songs is a music record chart of Mexico, published by Billboard since February 2022. It is updated every Tuesday on Billboard's website. It is part of Billboard's Hits of the World chart collection, which rank the top 25 songs weekly in more than 40 countries around the globe based on streaming and sales.

The charting songs are ranked based on a formula that incorporates official plays at the subscription and ad-supported levels of streaming music services such as YouTube, Spotify and Apple Music, as well as sales. Mexico Songs is the second Mexican music chart created by Billboard, after the defunct Mexico Airplay charts. Likewise, it was also the second chart of streaming songs in the country after Sreaming Semanal by the Asociación Mexicana de Productores de Fonogramas y Videogramas.

The first number-one song was "Lo Siento BB:/" by Tainy, Bad Bunny and Mexican singer Julieta Venegas on the issue dated 19 February 2022. The chart's current number-one song is "Cuando No Era Cantante" by El Bogueto and Yung Beed, on the week ending on 13 December 2025.

== List of number-one songs ==
Key
No.	nth song to top the Mexico Songs chart
re	Return of a song to number one

=== 2022 ===
#	Date	Song	Artist(s)	Ref.
1	19 February	"Lo Siento BB:/"	Tainy, Bad Bunny and Julieta Venegas	
2	26 February	"Mamiii"	Becky G and Karol G	
3	5 March	"Ya No Somos Ni Seremos"	Christian Nodal	
3	12 March	"Ya No Somos Ni Seremos"	Christian Nodal	
3	19 March	"Ya No Somos Ni Seremos"	Christian Nodal	
4	26 March	"Chale!"	Edén Muñoz	
4	2 April	"Chale!"	Edén Muñoz	
5	9 April	"Plan A"	Paulo Londra	
6	16 April	"As It Was"	Harry Styles	
7	23 April	"Fuera Del Mercado"	Danny Ocean	
re	30 April	"As It Was"	Harry Styles	
re	7 May	"As It Was"	Harry Styles	
8	14 May	"Provenza"	Karol G	
9	21 May	"Moscow Mule"	Bad Bunny	
10	28 May	"Ojitos Lindos"	Bad Bunny and Bomba Estéreo	
11	4 June	"Me Porto Bonito"	Bad Bunny and Chencho Corleone	
11	11 June	"Me Porto Bonito"	Bad Bunny and Chencho Corleone	
11	18 June	"Me Porto Bonito"	Bad Bunny and Chencho Corleone	
11	25 June	"Me Porto Bonito"	Bad Bunny and Chencho Corleone	
11	2 July	"Me Porto Bonito"	Bad Bunny and Chencho Corleone	
11	9 July	"Me Porto Bonito"	Bad Bunny and Chencho Corleone	
11	16 July	"Me Porto Bonito"	Bad Bunny and Chencho Corleone	
11	23 July	"Me Porto Bonito"	Bad Bunny and Chencho Corleone	
12	30 July	"Quevedo: Bzrp Music Sessions, Vol. 52"	Bizarrap and Quevedo	
12	6 August	"Quevedo: Bzrp Music Sessions, Vol. 52"	Bizarrap and Quevedo	
12	13 August	"Quevedo: Bzrp Music Sessions, Vol. 52"	Bizarrap and Quevedo	
12	20 August	"Quevedo: Bzrp Music Sessions, Vol. 52"	Bizarrap and Quevedo	
12	27 August	"Quevedo: Bzrp Music Sessions, Vol. 52"	Bizarrap and Quevedo	
12	3 September	"Quevedo: Bzrp Music Sessions, Vol. 52"	Bizarrap and Quevedo	
12	10 September	"Quevedo: Bzrp Music Sessions, Vol. 52"	Bizarrap and Quevedo	
12	17 September	"Quevedo: Bzrp Music Sessions, Vol. 52"	Bizarrap and Quevedo	
12	24 September	"Quevedo: Bzrp Music Sessions, Vol. 52"	Bizarrap and Quevedo	
12	1 October	"Quevedo: Bzrp Music Sessions, Vol. 52"	Bizarrap and Quevedo	
12	8 October	"Quevedo: Bzrp Music Sessions, Vol. 52"	Bizarrap and Quevedo	
12	15 October	"Quevedo: Bzrp Music Sessions, Vol. 52"	Bizarrap and Quevedo	
13	22 October	"No Se Va"	Grupo Frontera	
13	29 October	"No Se Va"	Grupo Frontera	
13	5 November	"No Se Va"	Grupo Frontera	
13	12 November	"No Se Va"	Grupo Frontera	
13	19 November	"No Se Va"	Grupo Frontera	
13	26 November	"No Se Va"	Grupo Frontera	
13	3 December	"No Se Va"	Grupo Frontera	
13	10 December	"No Se Va"	Grupo Frontera	
13	17 December	"No Se Va"	Grupo Frontera	
14	24 December	"Gatita"	Bellakath	
re	31 December	"No se va"	Grupo Frontera	

=== 2023 ===
#	Date	Song	Artist(s)	Ref.
re	7 January	"No Se Va"	Grupo Frontera	
15	14 January	"Qué Agonía"	Yuridia and Ángela Aguilar	
16	21 January	"Bebe Dame"	Fuerza Regida and Grupo Frontera	
17	28 January	"Shakira: Bzrp Music Sessions, Vol. 53"	Bizarrap and Shakira	
17	4 February	"Shakira: Bzrp Music Sessions, Vol. 53"	Bizarrap and Shakira	
17	11 February	"Shakira: Bzrp Music Sessions, Vol. 53"	Bizarrap and Shakira	
17	18 February	"Shakira: Bzrp Music Sessions, Vol. 53"	Bizarrap and Shakira	
18	25 February	"AMG"	Gabito Ballesteros, Peso Pluma & Natanael Cano	
18	4 March	"AMG"	Gabito Ballesteros, Peso Pluma & Natanael Cano	
19	11 March	"TQG"	Karol G and Shakira	
19	18 March	"TQG"	Karol G and Shakira	
19	25 March	"TQG"	Karol G and Shakira	
20	1 April	"Ella Baila Sola"	Eslabon Armado & Peso Pluma	
21	8 April	"La Bebé"	Yng Lvcas & Peso Pluma	
re	15 April	"Ella Baila Sola"	Eslabon Armado & Peso Pluma	
re	22 April	"Ella Baila Sola"	Eslabon Armado & Peso Pluma	
re	29 April	"Ella Baila Sola"	Eslabon Armado & Peso Pluma	
re	6 May	"Ella Baila Sola"	Eslabon Armado & Peso Pluma	
re	13 May	"Ella Baila Sola"	Eslabon Armado & Peso Pluma	
re	20 May	"Ella Baila Sola"	Eslabon Armado & Peso Pluma	
re	27 May	"Ella Baila Sola"	Eslabon Armado & Peso Pluma	
re	3 June	"Ella Baila Sola"	Eslabon Armado & Peso Pluma	
re	10 June	"Ella Baila Sola"	Eslabon Armado & Peso Pluma	
22	17 June	"Peso Pluma: Bzrp Music Sessions, Vol. 55"	Bizarrap & Peso Pluma	
22	24 June	"Peso Pluma: Bzrp Music Sessions, Vol. 55"	Bizarrap & Peso Pluma	
22	1 July	"Peso Pluma: Bzrp Music Sessions, Vol. 55"	Bizarrap & Peso Pluma	
23	8 July	"Lady Gaga"	Peso Pluma, Gabito Ballesteros & Junior H	
23	15 July	"Lady Gaga"	Peso Pluma, Gabito Ballesteros & Junior H	
24	22 July	"Sabor Fresa"	Fuerza Regida	
re	29 July	"Lady Gaga"	Peso Pluma, Gabito Ballesteros & Junior H	
re	5 August	"Lady Gaga"	Peso Pluma, Gabito Ballesteros & Junior H	
re	12 August	"Lady Gaga"	Peso Pluma, Gabito Ballesteros & Junior H	
re	19 August	"Lady Gaga"	Peso Pluma, Gabito Ballesteros & Junior H	
re	26 August	"Lady Gaga"	Peso Pluma, Gabito Ballesteros & Junior H	
re	2 September	"Lady Gaga"	Peso Pluma, Gabito Ballesteros & Junior H	
re	9 September	"Lady Gaga"	Peso Pluma, Gabito Ballesteros & Junior H	
25	16 September	"Qué Onda"	Calle 24 with Fuerza Regida and Chino Pacas	
25	23 September	"Qué Onda"	Calle 24 with Fuerza Regida and Chino Pacas	
re	30 September	"Lady Gaga"	Peso Pluma, Gabito Ballesteros & Junior H	
re	7 October	"Lady Gaga"	Peso Pluma, Gabito Ballesteros & Junior H	
re	14 October	"Lady Gaga"	Peso Pluma, Gabito Ballesteros & Junior H	
re	21 October	"Lady Gaga"	Peso Pluma, Gabito Ballesteros & Junior H	
26	28 October	"Monaco"	Bad Bunny	
re	4 November	"Qué Onda"	Calle 24 with Fuerza Regida and Chino Pacas	
27	11 November	"Harley Quinn"	Fuerza Regida and Marshmello	
27	18 November	"Harley Quinn"	Fuerza Regida and Marshmello	
27	25 November	"Harley Quinn"	Fuerza Regida and Marshmello	
27	2 December	"Harley Quinn"	Fuerza Regida and Marshmello	
27	9 December	"Harley Quinn"	Fuerza Regida and Marshmello	
27	16 December	"Harley Quinn"	Fuerza Regida and Marshmello	
27	23 December	"Harley Quinn"	Fuerza Regida and Marshmello	
28	30 December	"La Diabla"	Xavi	

=== 2024 ===
#	Date	Song	Artist(s)	Ref.
28	6 January	"La Diabla"	Xavi	
28	13 January	"La Diabla"	Xavi	
28	20 January	"La Diabla"	Xavi	
28	27 January	"La Diabla"	Xavi	
28	3 February	"La Diabla"	Xavi	
28	10 February	"La Diabla"	Xavi	
28	17 February	"La Diabla"	Xavi	
28	24 February	"La Diabla"	Xavi	
28	2 March	"La Diabla"	Xavi	
28	9 March	"La Diabla"	Xavi	
28	16 March	"La Diabla"	Xavi	
28	23 March	"La Diabla"	Xavi	
29	30 March	"Madonna"	Natanael Cano and Óscar Maydon	
29	6 April	"Madonna"	Natanael Cano and Óscar Maydon	
29	13 April	"Madonna"	Natanael Cano and Óscar Maydon	
29	20 April	"Madonna"	Natanael Cano and Óscar Maydon	
29	27 April	"Madonna"	Natanael Cano and Óscar Maydon	
29	4 May	"Madonna"	Natanael Cano and Óscar Maydon	
29	11 May	"Madonna"	Natanael Cano and Óscar Maydon	
29	18 May	"Madonna"	Natanael Cano and Óscar Maydon	
29	25 May	"Madonna"	Natanael Cano and Óscar Maydon	
29	1 June	"Madonna"	Natanael Cano and Óscar Maydon	
29	8 June	"Madonna"	Natanael Cano and Óscar Maydon	
30	15 June	"Si No Quieres No"	Luis R. Conriquez and Neton Vega	
30	22 June	"Si No Quieres No"	Luis R. Conriquez and Neton Vega	
31	29 June	"Volver al Futuro"	Óscar Maydon and Junior H	
re	6 July	"Si No Quieres No"	Luis R. Conriquez and Neton Vega	
re	13 July	"Si No Quieres No"	Luis R. Conriquez and Neton Vega	
re	20 July	"Si No Quieres No"	Luis R. Conriquez and Neton Vega	
re	27 July	"Si No Quieres No"	Luis R. Conriquez and Neton Vega	
re	3 August	"Si No Quieres No"	Luis R. Conriquez and Neton Vega	
re	10 August	"Si No Quieres No"	Luis R. Conriquez and Neton Vega	
32	17 August	"La Patrulla"	Peso Pluma and Neton Vega	
32	24 August	"La Patrulla"	Peso Pluma and Neton Vega	
32	31 August	"La Patrulla"	Peso Pluma and Neton Vega	
32	7 September	"La Patrulla"	Peso Pluma and Neton Vega	
32	14 September	"La Patrulla"	Peso Pluma and Neton Vega	
32	21 September	"La Patrulla"	Peso Pluma and Neton Vega	
32	28 September	"La Patrulla"	Peso Pluma and Neton Vega	
33	5 October	"El Lokerón"	Tito Double P	
33	12 October	"El Lokerón"	Tito Double P	
33	19 October	"El Lokerón"	Tito Double P	
34	26 October	"Tu Boda"	Óscar Maydon and Fuerza Regida	
34	2 November	"Tu Boda"	Óscar Maydon and Fuerza Regida	
34	9 November	"Tu Boda"	Óscar Maydon and Fuerza Regida	
34	16 November	"Tu Boda"	Óscar Maydon and Fuerza Regida	
34	23 November	"Tu Boda"	Óscar Maydon and Fuerza Regida	
34	30 November	"Tu Boda"	Óscar Maydon and Fuerza Regida	
34	7 December	"Tu Boda"	Óscar Maydon and Fuerza Regida	
34	14 December	"Tu Boda"	Óscar Maydon and Fuerza Regida	
34	21 December	"Tu Boda"	Óscar Maydon and Fuerza Regida	
34	28 December	"Tu Boda"	Óscar Maydon and Fuerza Regida	

=== 2025 ===
#	Date	Song	Artist(s)	Ref.
34	4 January	"Tu Boda"	Óscar Maydon and Fuerza Regida	
35	11 January	"Rosones"	Tito Double P	
35	18 January	"Rosones"	Tito Double P	
36	25 January	"DTMF"	Bad Bunny	
36	1 February	"DTMF"	Bad Bunny	
36	8 February	"DTMF"	Bad Bunny	
37	15 February	"Loco"	Neton Vega	
37	22 February	"Loco"	Neton Vega	
38	1 March	"Te Quería Ver"	Alemán and Neton Vega	
38	8 March	"Te Quería Ver"	Alemán and Neton Vega	
39	15 March	"7 Días"	Gabito Ballesteros and Tito Double P	
40	22 March	"Tattoo"	Tito Double P	
40	29 March	"Tattoo"	Tito Double P	
re	5 April	"Te Quería Ver"	Alemán and Neton Vega	
re	12 April	"Te Quería Ver"	Alemán and Neton Vega	
re	19 April	"Te Quería Ver"	Alemán and Neton Vega	
re	26 April	"Te Quería Ver"	Alemán and Neton Vega	
41	3 May	"Morena"	Neton Vega and Peso Pluma	
41	10 May	"Morena"	Neton Vega and Peso Pluma	
42	17 May	"Vita Fer"	Los Dareyes de la Sierra and Tito Double P	
42	24 May	"Vita Fer"	Los Dareyes de la Sierra and Tito Double P	
43	31 May	"Marlboro Rojo"	Fuerza Regida	
44	7 June	"Tu Sancho"	Fuerza Regida	
45	14 June	"Triple Lavada"	Esau Ortiz	
45	21 June	"Triple Lavada"	Esau Ortiz	
re	28 June	"Tu Sancho"	Fuerza Regida	
re	5 July	"Tu Sancho"	Fuerza Regida	
re	12 July	"Tu Sancho"	Fuerza Regida	
re	19 July	"Tu Sancho"	Fuerza Regida	
re	26 July	"Tu Sancho"	Fuerza Regida	
46	2 August	"Por Sus Besos"	Tito Double P	
re	9 August	"Tu Sancho"	Fuerza Regida	
re	16 August	"Tu Sancho"	Fuerza Regida	
47	23 August	"Perlas Negras"	Natanael Cano and Gabito Ballesteros	
47	30 August	"Perlas Negras"	Natanael Cano and Gabito Ballesteros	
47	6 September	"Perlas Negras"	Natanael Cano and Gabito Ballesteros	
47	13 September	"Perlas Negras"	Natanael Cano and Gabito Ballesteros	
47	20 September	"Perlas Negras"	Natanael Cano and Gabito Ballesteros	
47	27 September	"Perlas Negras"	Natanael Cano and Gabito Ballesteros	
47	4 October	"Perlas Negras"	Natanael Cano and Gabito Ballesteros	
47	11 October	"Perlas Negras"	Natanael Cano and Gabito Ballesteros	
48	18 October	"Orula"	Victor Mendivil	
re	25 October	"Perlas Negras"	Natanael Cano and Gabito Ballesteros	
re	1 November	"Perlas Negras"	Natanael Cano and Gabito Ballesteros	
49	8 November	"Cuando No Era Cantante"	El Bogueto and Yung Beef	
49	15 November	"Cuando No Era Cantante"	El Bogueto and Yung Beef	
49	22 November	"Cuando No Era Cantante"	El Bogueto and Yung Beef	
49	29 November	"Cuando No Era Cantante"	El Bogueto and Yung Beef	
49	6 December	"Cuando No Era Cantante"	El Bogueto and Yung Beef	
49	13 December	"Cuando No Era Cantante"	El Bogueto and Yung Beef	

== Songs milestones ==
=== Most weeks at number one ===
Song	Artist(s)	No. of weeks
"Lady Gaga"	Peso Pluma, Gabito Ballesteros & Junior H	13
"La Diabla"	Xavi	13
"Quevedo: Bzrp Music Sessions, Vol. 52"	Bizarrap and Quevedo	12
"No Se Va"	Grupo Frontera	11
"Madonna"	Natanael Cano and Óscar Maydon	11
"Tu Boda"	Óscar Maydon and Fuerza Regida	11
"Ella Baila Sola"	Eslabon Armado & Peso Pluma	10
"Perlas Negras"	Natanael Cano and Gabito Ballesteros	9
"Me Porto Bonito"	Bad Bunny and Chencho Corleone	8
"Si No Quieres No"	Luis R Conriquez and Neton Vega	8
"Harley Quinn"	Fuerza Regida & Marshmello	7
"La Patrulla"	Peso Pluma and Neton Vega	7
"Tu Sancho"	Fuerza Regida	7
"Te Quería Ver"	Alemán and Neton Vega	6
"Cuando No Era Cantante"	El Bogueto and Yung Beef	6
"Shakira: Bzrp Music Sessions, Vol. 53"	Bizarrap and Shakira	4
"Ya No Somos Ni Seremos"	Christian Nodal	3
"As It Was"	Harry Styles	3
"TQG"	Karol G and Shakira	3
"Peso Pluma: Bzrp Music Sessions, Vol. 55"	Bizarrap and Peso Pluma	3
"Qué Onda"	Calle 24, Chino Pacas & Fuerza Regida	3
"El Lokerón"	Tito Double P	3
"DTMF"	Bad Bunny	3
"Chale"	Eden Muñoz	2
"AMG"	Natanael Cano, Peso Pluma & Gabito Ballesteros	2
"Rosones"	Tito Double P	2
"Loco"	Neton Vega	2
"Tattoo"	Tito Double P	2
"Morena"	Neton Vega and Peso Pluma	2
"Vita Fer"	Los Dareyes De La Sierra and Tito Double P	2
"Triple Lavada"	Esau Ortiz	2

== Artists milestones ==
=== Most number-one songs ===
Artist	No. of songs
Fuerza Regida	7
Peso Pluma	7
Bad Bunny	6
Tito Double P	6
Neton Vega	5
Gabito Ballesteros	4
Karol G	3
Bizarrap	3
Óscar Maydon	3
Natanael Cano	3
Grupo Frontera	2
Shakira	2
Junior H	2

=== Most weeks at number-one ===
Artist	No. of weeks
Peso Pluma	38
Fuerza Regida	32
Gabito Ballesteros	26
Neton Vega	25
Óscar Maydon	23
Natanael Cano	23
Bizarrap	19
Bad Bunny	15
Junior H	14
Xavi	13
Quevedo	12
Grupo Frontera	12
Tito Double P	11
Eslabon Armado	10
Chencho Corleone	8
Luis R Conriquez	8
Shakira	7
Marshmello	7
Alemán	6
El Bogueto	6
Yung Beef	6
Karol G	5
Christian Nodal	3
Harry Styles	3
Calle 24	3
Chino Pacas	3
Eden Muñoz	2
Los Dareyes De La Sierra	2
Esau Ortiz	2
