= Fuerza Regida discography =

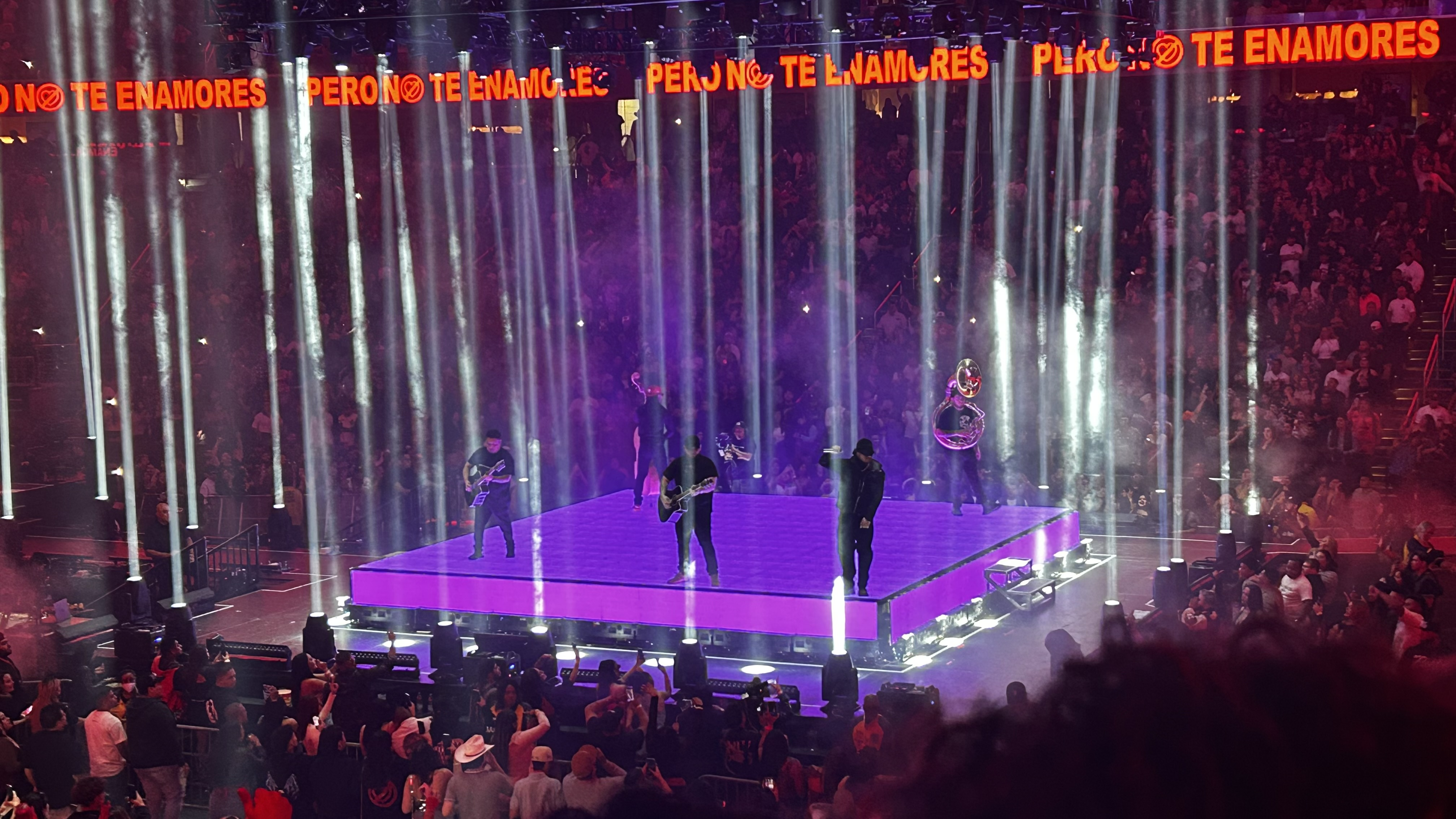
- Fuerza Regida performing in 2024
- Studio albums: 9
- EPs: 4
- Live albums: 4
- Singles: 73

The discography of Mexican American regional Mexican band Fuerza Regida consists of nine studio albums, four live albums, four extended plays, and 73 singles.

Originally formed in 2015 as a cover band, Fuerza Regida would create their YouTube channel two years later, where they uploaded covers of other artists as well as songs they had written. The band obtained popularity through their 2018 single "Radicamos en South Central" which attracted attention by Ramón Ruiz, frontman of the band Legado 7, who signed them to their own record label Lumbre Music and the independent label Rancho Humilde. Soon after getting signed, Fuerza Regida released their first live album En Vivo Puros Corridos (2018), which also includes their hit single "Radicamos en South Central" as well as other songs such as "Soy Montero" and "Dos Plumas".

In February 2019, the band released their debut EP Las Romanticas Favoritas de Fuerza Regida to coincide with Valentine's Day, which peaked at number 19 on the Billboard Regional Mexican Albums chart, marking their first appearance in any chart in the United States. In July 2019, Fuerza Regida released their debut studio album Del Barrio Hasta Aquí which contains singles such as "Sigo Chambeando" and "Rey del Humo". Del Barrio Hasta Aquí peaked at number one on the Regional Mexican Albums chart, marking the band's first number-one on any chart. It also reached the top 10 on the Top Latin Albums chart.

== Albums ==
=== Studio albums ===
List of studio albums, with selected details, chart positions, and certifications
Title	Details	Peak chart positions			Sales	Certifications
Title	Details	US	US Latin	US Reg. Mex.	Sales	Certifications
Del Barrio Hasta Aquí	Released: July 4, 2019; Label: Rancho Humilde, Lumbre Music; Format: Digital download, streaming	—	8	1		RIAA: 2× Platinum (Latin)
Adicto	Released: April 10, 2020; Label: Rancho Humilde, Lumbre Music; Format: Digital download, streaming	—	4	1		
Otro Pedo, Otro Mundo	Released: September 25, 2020; Label: Rancho Humilde, Lumbre Music; Format: Digital download, streaming	—	45	10		
Del Barrio Hasta Aquí, Vol. 2	Released: February 12, 2021; Label: Rancho Humilde, Cinq Music Group; Format: Digital download, streaming	—	14	2		RIAA: 2× Platinum (Latin)
Pa Que Hablen	Released: December 30, 2022; Label: Sony Music Latin, Rancho Humilde, Street Mob; Format: Digital download, streaming	60	3	1		RIAA: 11× Platinum (Latin); AMPROFON: 3× Platinum
Sigan Hablando	Released: December 30, 2022; Label: Sony Music Latin, Rancho Humilde, Street Mob; Format: Digital download, streaming	65	2	1		RIAA: 7× Platinum (Latin); AMPROFON: Platinum+Gold
Pa Las Baby's y Belikeada	Released: October 20, 2023; Label: Sony Music Latin, Rancho Humilde, Street Mob; Format: Digital download, streaming	14	1	1		RIAA: 2× Diamond (Latin); AMPROFON: 3× Platinum
Pero No Te Enamores	Released: July 25, 2024; Label: Sony Music Latin, Rancho Humilde, Street Mob; Format: Digital download, streaming	25	2	—		RIAA: 2× Platinum (Latin); AMPROFON: 2× Platinum+Gold
111xpantia	Released: May 2, 2025; Label: Sony Music Latin, Rancho Humilde, Street Mob; Format: LP, CD, digital download, streaming	2	1	1	US: 39,000	AMPROFON: Diamond+2× Platinum
"—" denotes a recording that did not chart or was not released in that territory.

=== Live albums ===
List of live albums, with selected details and chart positions
Title	Details	Peak chart positions	
Title	Details	US Latin	US Reg. Mex.
En Vivo Puros Corridos	Released: July 20, 2018; Label: Rancho Humilde, Lumbre Music; Format: Digital download, streaming	—	—
Pisteando con la Regida	Released: December 13, 2019; Label: Rancho Humilde, Lumbre Music; Format: Digital download, streaming	26	3
Pisteando con la Regida, Vol. 2	Released: January 31, 2020; Label: Rancho Humilde, Lumbre Music; Format: Digital download, streaming	—	—
Pisteando con la Regida, Vol. 3	Released: December 22, 2020; Label: Rancho Humilde, Lumbre Music; Format: Digital download, streaming	—	—
"—" denotes a recording that did not chart or was not released in that territory.

== Extended plays ==
List of extended plays, with selected details and chart positions
Title	Details	Peak chart positions			Certifications
Title	Details	US	US Latin	US Reg. Mex.	Certifications
Las Romanticas Favoritas de Fuerza Regida	Released: February 14, 2019; Label: Rancho Humilde; Format: Digital download, streaming	—	—	19	
Navidad con la Regida	Released: December 1, 2020; Label: Rancho Humilde; Format: Digital download, streaming	—	—	—	
Dolido Pero No Arrepentido	Released: February 9, 2024; Label: Rancho Humilde, Street Mob, Sony Latin; Format: Digital download, streaming	69	6	3	RIAA: 5× Platinum (Latin)
Mala Mía (with Grupo Frontera)	Released: December 19, 2024; Label: Rancho Humilde, Street Mob, Sony Latin; Format: Digital download, streaming	—	9	6	
"—" denotes a recording that did not chart or was not released in that territory.

== Singles ==
List of singles, with selected chart positions, and album name
Title	Year	Peak chart positions										Certifications	Album
Title	Year	US	US Latin	US Reg. Mex	BOL	COL	ECU	MEX	PER	SPA	WW	Certifications	Album
"Soy Montero"	2018	—	—	—	—	—	—	—	—	—	—		En Vivo Puros Corridos
"Radicamos en South Central"	2018	—	24	10^{1}	—	—	—	—	—	—	—		En Vivo Puros Corridos
"Dos Plumas"	2018	—	—	—	—	—	—	—	—	—	—		En Vivo Puros Corridos
"30 Kilos"	2018	—	—	—	—	—	—	—	—	—	—		Del Barrio Hasta Aquí
"Grafiteando Paredes"	2018	—	—	—	—	—	—	—	—	—	—		Del Barrio Hasta Aquí
"En Modesto Se la Pasa"	2019	—	—	—	—	—	—	—	—	—	—		Del Barrio Hasta Aquí
"El Dinero los Cambió"	2019	—	42	36^{1}	—	—	—	—	—	—	—	RIAA: 7× Platinum (Latin)	Del Barrio Hasta Aquí
"Soy de Michoacán"	2019	—	—	—	—	—	—	—	—	—	—		Del Barrio Hasta Aquí
"Entre Files y Las Huertas"	2019	—	—	—	—	—	—	—	—	—	—		Del Barrio Hasta Aquí
"Cupcake Quemando" (with Legado 7)	2019	—	—	—	—	—	—	—	—	—	—		Non-album single
"Rey del Humo"	2019	—	—	—	—	—	—	—	—	—	—		Del Barrio Hasta Aquí
"Aquí Sigo Yo"	2019	—	—	—	—	—	—	—	—	—	—		Del Barrio Hasta Aquí
"Malos Pasos"	2019	—	—	—	—	—	—	—	—	—	—		Del Barrio Hasta Aquí
"Sigo Chambeando"	2019	—	— (Note: "Sigo Chambeando" did not enter the US Hot Latin Songs chart, but peaked at number 20 on the US Latin Airplay chart.)	5^{1}	—	—	—	—	—	—	—		Del Barrio Hasta Aquí
"Del Barrio"	2019	—	—	—	—	—	—	—	—	—	—		Non-album single
"El Muchacho Alegre"	2019	—	— (Note: "El Muchacho Alegre" did not enter the US Hot Latin Songs chart, but peaked at number 46 on the US Latin Airplay chart.)	18^{1}	—	—	—	—	—	—	—		Pisteando con la Regida
"Prenda del Alma"	2019	—	—	—	—	—	—	—	—	—	—		Pisteando con la Regida
"Lowrider Gee" (with Junior H)	2020	—	—	—	—	—	—	—	—	—	—		Non-album singles
"Lo Estoy Pensando"	2020	—	—	—	—	—	—	—	—	—	—		Non-album singles
"Cuenta Conmigo" (with Los Tigres del Norte, Ana Bárbara and Natanael Cano)	2020	—	— (Note: "Cuenta Conmigo" did not enter the US Hot Latin Songs chart, but peaked at number 46 on the US Latin Airplay chart.)	16^{1}	—	—	—	—	—	—	—		Non-album singles
"Agusto (GTR)"	2020	—	—	—	—	—	—	—	—	—	—		Adicto
"Pandemia"	2020	—	—	—	—	—	—	—	—	—	—		Non-album single
"Intro"/"Adicto"	2020	—	—	—	—	—	—	—	—	—	—		Adicto
"Estoy Aquí"	2020	—	—	—	—	—	—	—	—	—	—		Adicto
"Bien Frozen"	2020	—	—	—	—	—	—	—	—	—	—		Otro Pedo, Otro Mundo
"Ahí Les Va"	2020	—	—	—	—	—	—	—	—	—	—		Otro Pedo, Otro Mundo
"Mares y los Yates"	2020	—	—	—	—	—	—	—	—	—	—		Otro Pedo, Otro Mundo
"Por las Calles de Houston"	2020	—	—	—	—	—	—	—	—	—	—		Otro Pedo, Otro Mundo
"Vamos Bien"	2020	—	—	—	—	—	—	—	—	—	—		Otro Pedo, Otro Mundo
"Ando Bien Pedo"	2020	—	—	—	—	—	—	—	—	—	—		Pisteando con la Regida, Vol. 3
"Árboles de la Barranca" (with El Coyote)	2020	—	—	—	—	—	—	—	—	—	—		Pisteando con la Regida, Vol. 3
"Prohibido" (with El Yaki)	2020	—	—	—	—	—	—	—	—	—	—		Pisteando con la Regida, Vol. 3
"No Logré Olvidarte"	2020	—	—	—	—	—	—	—	—	—	—		Pisteando con la Regida, Vol. 3
"No Es Pa Presumir"	2021	—	—	—	—	—	—	—	—	—	—		Del Barrio Hasta Aquí, Vol. 2
"Qué Está Pasando" (with Calle 24)	2021	—	36	—	—	—	—	—	—	—	—		Del Barrio Hasta Aquí, Vol. 2
"Lo Vieron Pasar (09)"	2021	—	—	—	—	—	—	—	—	—	—		Del Barrio Hasta Aquí, Vol. 2
"Descansando"	2021	—	20	9^{1}	—	—	—	45	—	—	—		Del Barrio Hasta Aquí, Vol. 2
"Los Miré Con Talento" (with Luis R. Conriquez and Calle 24)	2021	—	24	—	—	—	—	—	—	—	—		Del Barrio Hasta Aquí, Vol. 2
"No Le Aflojo"	2022	—	14	—	—	—	—	—	—	—	—	RIAA: Diamond (Latin)	Non-album single
"Gente del Flaco"	2022	—	—	—	—	—	—	—	—	—	—		Del Barrio Hasta Aquí, Vol. 2
"Me Acostumbré a Lo Bueno"	2022	—	24	—	—	—	—	—	—	—	—		Del Barrio Hasta Aquí, Vol. 2
"Chingas a Tu Madre"	2022	—	47	—	—	—	—	—	—	—	—		Non-album singles
"1000 Canciónes (Pa Mis Viejos)"	2022	—	—	—	—	—	—	—	—	—	—		Non-album singles
"Señor Miedo"	2022	—	—	—	—	—	—	—	—	—	—		Non-album singles
"Billete Grande" (with Edgardo Nuñez)	2022	—	16	—	—	—	—	15	—	—	199		Non-album singles
"Ahora Piden Paros"	2022	—	—	—	—	—	—	—	—	—	—		Non-album singles
"Chrysler 300"	2022	—	—	—	—	—	—	—	—	—	—		Sigan Hablando
"Prefiero Empedarme"	2022	—	—	30^{1}	—	—	—	—	—	—	—		Sigan Hablando
"911 (En Vivo)" (with Grupo Frontera)	2022	—	24	—	—	—	—	—	—	—	—	AMPROFON: 4× Platinum+Gold	Non-album single
"CH y la Pizza" (with Natanael Cano) (original or "banda" version)	2022	68	9	—	—	—	—	7	—	—	39	AMPROFON: 2× Diamond+3× Platinum	Pa Que Hablen
"Bebe Dame" (with Grupo Frontera)	2022	25	1	1^{1}	3	—	25	1	—	—	17	AMPROFON: 2× Diamond+Gold	Sigan Hablando
"Francotirador" (with Herencia de Patrones and Calle 24)	2022	—	—	—	—	—	—	—	—	—	—		Pa Que Hablen
"El Pickles" (with Grupo Marca Registrada)	2023	—	—	—	—	—	—	—	—	—	—		Don't Stop the Magic
"Igualito a Mi Apá" (with Peso Pluma)	2023	80	16	—	—	—	—	20	—	—	118	AMPROFON: 4× Platinum+Gold	Pa Que Hablen
"Vete Ya" (with Gabito Ballesteros)	2023	—	—	—	—	—	—	—	—	—	—		Non-album singles
"Te Quiero Besar" (with Becky G)	2023	—	27	—	—	—	—	—	—	—	—		Non-album singles
"Don Chon (En Vivo)" (with Juanpa Salazar and Natanael Cano)	2023	—	—	—	—	—	—	—	—	—	—		Non-album singles
"Desvelado"	2023	—	—	—	—	—	—	—	—	—	—		Non-album singles
"Dijeron Que No La Iba Lograr" (with Chino Pacas)	2023	— (Note: "Dijeron Que No La Iba Lograr" did not enter the Billboard Hot 100, but peaked at number one on the Bubbling Under Hot 100 chart.)	15	—	—	—	—	14	—	—	108		Non-album singles
"¿Qué Se Te Quitó?"	2023	—	46	—	—	—	—	—	—	—	—		Non-album singles
"Creció la Cuenta" (with Marca MP)	2023	—	—	—	—	—	—	—	—	—	—		Non-album singles
"De Lunes a Viernes" (with Calle 24 and Angel Ureta)	2023	—	—	—	—	—	—	—	—	—	—		Non-album singles
"Mentira No Es" (with Banda MS de Sergio Lizárraga)	2023	—	— (Note: "Mentira No Es" did not enter the US Hot Latin Songs chart, but peaked at number six on the US Latin Airplay chart.)	1^{1}	—	—	—	—	—	—	—	AMPROFON: Gold	Non-album singles
"Santo Patrón" (with Banda MS de Sergio Lizárraga)	2023	—	— (Note: "Santo Patrón" did not enter the US Hot Latin Songs chart, but peaked at number 32 on the US Latin Airplay chart.)	13^{1}	—	—	—	—	—	—	—	AMPROFON: Gold	Non-album singles
"Pariente" (with Myke Towers)	2023	—	—	—	—	—	—	—	—	—	—		Non-album singles
"TQM"	2023	34	5	—	—	—	—	2	—	—	15	RIAA: 37× Platinum (Latin); AMPROFON: Diamond+4× Platinum	Pa Las Baby's y Belikeada
"Sabor Fresa"	2023	26	3	—	—	—	—	1	—	—	16	RIAA: 37× Platinum (Latin); AMPROFON: 2× Diamond+2× Platinum	Pa Las Baby's y Belikeada
"Tiki Taka Toco" (with Take a Daytrip)	2023	—	—	—	—	—	—	—	—	—	—		Non-album singles
"La Tierra del Corrido" (with Los Tucanes de Tijuana and Edén Muñoz)	2023	—	—	—	—	—	—	—	—	—	—	RIAA: 2× Platinum (Latin); AMPROFON: Platinum	Non-album singles
"Qué Onda" (with Calle 24 and Chino Pacas)	2023	61	8	—	13	13	9	1	—	—	26	RIAA: Diamond (Latin)	Ondeados
"El Jefe" (with Shakira)	2023	55	4	9^{1}	12	7	13	10	18	12	24	RIAA: 7× Platinum (Latin); AMPROFON: 2× Platinum; PROMUSICAE: Gold	Las Mujeres Ya No Lloran
"Antídoto" (with Oscar Maydon)	2023	—	—	—	—	—	—	—	—	—	—		Non-album single
"Harley Quinn" (with Marshmello)	2023	40	2	1^{1}	8	—	10	1	—	—	14	RIAA: 27× Platinum (Latin); AMPROFON: 2× Diamond+Platinum	Pa Las Baby's y Belikeada
"Tacata" (remix) (with Tiagz and El Alfa)	2023	— (Note: "Tacata" (remix) did not enter the Billboard Hot 100, but peaked at number six on the Bubbling Under Hot 100 chart.)	15	—	—	—	—	—	—	—	—		Non-album singles
"Toretto" (with El Alfa and Donaty)	2023	—	—	—	—	—	—	—	—	—	—		Non-album singles
"Tú Name"	2024	66	2	—	—	—	—	6	—	—	64	AMPROFON: Diamond+4× Platinum+Gold	Dolido Pero No Arrepentido
"Money Edition" (with Edén Muñoz)	2024	—	47	—	—	—	—	—	—	—	—	AMPROFON: Platinum+Gold	Edén
"Tu Boda" (with Oscar Maydon)	2024	22	1	1^{1}	1	15	1	1	15	—	4	RIAA: 19× Platinum (Latin); AMPROFON: 3× Diamond+Gold	Rico o Muerto, Vol. 1
"Me Acostumbre a Lo Bueno II"	2024	—	24	—	—	—	—	—	—	—	—		Non-album single
"Modo Capone" (with Chino Pacas and Drake)	2024	— (Note: "Modo Capone" did not enter the Billboard Hot 100, but peaked at number eight on the Bubbling Under Hot 100 chart.)	11	—	—	—	—	—	—	—	—		Que Sigan Llegando las Pacas
"No Pasa Nada" (with Clave Especial)	2024	—	16	—	—	—	—	—	—	—	—	RIAA: 4× Platinum (Latin)	Mija No Te Asustes
"Cholo 7" (with Luis R Conriquez)	2024	—	14	—	—	—	—	—	—	—	—	AMPROFON: Platinum	Non-album singles
"Rosones" (with Jorsshh)	2024	— (Note: "Rosones" did not enter the Billboard Hot 100, but peaked at number 12 on the Bubbling Under Hot 100 chart.)	13	19	—	—	—	14	—	—	187		Ay Weyy
"Pika Pika" (with Jorsshh, Chuyin and Calle 24)	2024	—	37	25	—	—	—	—	11	—	— (Note: "Pika Pika" did not enter the Billboard Global 200, but peaked at number 151 on the Billboard Global Excl. U.S. chart.)		Los Locos Nunca Mueren
"Por Esos Ojos"	2025	64	3	2	—	—	—	3	—	—	49	AMPROFON: Diamond+4× Platinum+Gold	111xpantia
"Chula Vente" (with Luis R Conriquez and Netón Vega)	2025	— (Note: "Chula Vente" did not enter the Billboard Hot 100, but peaked at number 10 on the Bubbling Under Hot 100 chart.)	9	—	—	—	—	2	—	—	62	AMPROFON: Diamond+Platinum	Meneo
"Como Oreo" (with Blessd and Ovy on the Drums)	2025	—	35	—	—	2	—	—	—	—	—		Non-album singles
"Seguro Le Dolió" (with Banda MS)	2025	— (Note: "Seguro Le Dolió" did not enter the Billboard Hot 100, but peaked at number 22 on the Bubbling Under Hot 100 chart.)	10	6	—	—	—	24	—	—	—		Non-album singles
"Cuando No Era Cantante" (Remix) (with El Bogueto, Anuel AA and Yung Beef)	2025	— (Note: "Cuando No Era Cantante" (Remix) did not enter the Billboard Hot 100, but peaked at number 11 on the Bubbling Under Hot 100 chart.)	10	—	2	13	4	6	6	13	25		Eso Si Es de Gangster
"Triston"	2026	— (Note: "Triston" did not enter the Billboard Hot 100, but peaked at number 7 on the Bubbling Under Hot 100 chart.)	14	5	—	—	—	—	—	—	—		Non-album single
"Noche Perfecta"	2026	—	10	3	—	—	—	8	—	—	—		Eterno
"Ferrari" (with Clave Especial and Los Gemelos de Sinaloa)	2026	83	6	1	—	—	—	—	—	—	—		The Gemeliza
"Todos nos Shipean"	2026	—	21	9	—	—	—	15	—	—	—		Non-album single
"Hay Con Que" (with Luis R. Conriquez and Anuel AA)	2026	—	36	22	—	—	—	—	—	—	—		Muchacho Alegre
"Suzuki"	2026	— (Note: "Suzuki" did not enter the Billboard Hot 100, but peaked at number five on the Bubbling Under Hot 100 chart.)	5	—	4	—	3	1	—	—	46		Grand Theft Auto VI: The Album
"Olimpo" (with Netón Vega)	2026	—	8	—	—	—	—	4	—	—	145		Non-album single
"—" denotes a recording that did not chart or was not released in that territory.

== Other charted and certified songs ==
List of other charted songs, with selected chart positions, certifications and album name
Title	Year	Peak chart positions								Certifications	Album
Title	Year	US	US Latin	US Reg. Mex	BOL	COL	ECU	MEX	WW	Certifications	Album
"La Perrié" (with Eslabón Armado)	2022	—	38	—	—	—	—	—	—		Nostalgia
"Mi Vecindario"	2022	—	49	—	—	—	—	—	—		Pa Que Hablen
"Mi Terre CLN" (with Juanpa Salazar)	2022	—	23	—	—	—	—	—	—	AMPROFON: 4× Platinum	Pa Que Hablen
"Modo Maldito" (with Grupo Marca Registrada)	2022	—	—	—	—	—	—	—	—	AMPROFON: 3× Platinum	Pa Que Hablen
"Se Logro"	2022	—	—	—	—	—	—	—	—	AMPROFON: Gold	Sigan Hablando
"Me Tocó Morir" (with Alfredo Olivas)	2022	—	—	—	—	—	—	—	—	AMPROFON: 2× Platinum+Gold	Sigan Hablando
"Sobras y Mujeres"	2023	— (Note: "Sobras y Mujeres" did not enter the Billboard Hot 100, but peaked at number 15 on the Bubbling Under Hot 100 chart.)	40	—	—	—	—	—	—		Pa Las Baby's y Belikeada
"Excesos"	2023	— (Note: "Excesos" did not enter the Billboard Hot 100, but peaked at number 20 on the Bubbling Under Hot 100 chart.)	20	—	—	—	—	—	—	AMPROFON: 2× Diamond	Pa Las Baby's y Belikeada
"Crazyz"	2023	— (Note: "Crazyz" did not enter the Billboard Hot 100, but peaked at number 21 on the Bubbling Under Hot 100 chart.)	17	—	—	—	—	23	—	AMPROFON: Diamond+Platinum+Gold	Pa Las Baby's y Belikeada
"Barbiez"	2023	—	19	—	—	—	—	—	—	AMPROFON: 3× Platinum+Gold	Pa Las Baby's y Belikeada
"Plvo Blnco" (with Jonathan Caro and Chino Pacas)	2023	—	—	—	—	—	—	—	—	AMPROFON: Platinum	Pa Las Baby's y Belikeada
"Inmortal" (with Chuyin)	2023	—	—	—	—	—	—	—	—	AMPROFON: 4× Platinum	Pa Las Baby's y Belikeada
"Una Cerveza" (with Manuel Turizo)	2023	—	15	18^{1}	—	—	—	20	—	AMPROFON: Diamond+2× Platinum	Pa Las Baby's y Belikeada
"Enculado"	2024	—	26	—	—	—	—	—	—	AMPROFON: 2× Platinum+Gold	Dolido Pero No Arrepentido
"Brillarosa"	2024	— (Note: "Brillarosa" did not enter the Billboard Hot 100, but peaked at number 17 on the Bubbling Under Hot 100 chart.)	14	—	—	—	—	—	—	AMPROFON: 4× Platinum	Dolido Pero No Arrepentido
"Oye"	2024	—	35	—	—	—	—	—	—	AMPROFON: 2× Platinum+Gold	Dolido Pero No Arrepentido
"Falsa"	2024	—	32	—	—	—	—	—	—	AMPROFON: Platinum+Gold	Dolido Pero No Arrepentido
"Pxtxs"	2024	—	44	—	—	—	—	—	—	AMPROFON: Gold	Dolido Pero No Arrepentido
"Tuqlo"	2024	—	24	—	—	—	—	—	—		Pero No Te Enamores
"Nel"	2024	70	3	—	—	—	—	5	63	AMPROFON: Diamond+2× Platinum+Gold	Pero No Te Enamores
"Sofia" (with Major Lazer and Alok)	2024	— (Note: "Sofia" did not enter the Billboard Hot 100, but peaked at number 20 on the US Hot Dance/Electronic Songs chart.)	32	—	—	—	—	—	—		Pero No Te Enamores
"Kylie"	2024	— (Note: "Kylie" did not enter the Billboard Hot 100, but peaked at number 23 on the US Hot Dance/Electronic Songs chart.)	40	—	—	—	—	—	—		Pero No Te Enamores
"Bella"	2024	—	41	—	—	—	—	—	—	AMPROFON: Platinum+Gold	Pero No Te Enamores
"Fvck" (with Afrojack)	2024	— (Note: "Fvck" did not enter the Billboard Hot 100, but peaked at number 30 on the US Hot Dance/Electronic Songs chart.)	—	—	—	—	—	—	—		Pero No Te Enamores
"Valeria" (with Maluma and Gordo)	2024	—	42	—	—	—	—	—	—		Pero No Te Enamores
"Secreto Victoria"	2024	—	27	—	—	—	—	—	—		Pero No Te Enamores
"Fresita" (with Bellakath)	2024	—	34	—	—	—	—	—	—	AMPROFON: Platinum	Pero No Te Enamores
"Pero No Te Enamores"	2024	—	12	—	—	—	—	—	—	AMPROFON: 4× Platinum+Gold	Pero No Te Enamores
"Smith" (with Chino Pacas and Junior H)	2024	—	21	—	—	—	—	—	—		Que Sigan Llegando las Pacas
"Me Jalo" (with Grupo Frontera)	2024	48	2	1	6	—	—	7	38	AMPROFON: Diamond+3× Platinum+Gold	Mala Mía
"0 Sentimientos" (with Grupo Frontera)	2024	—	46	—	—	—	—	—	—	AMPROFON: Gold	Mala Mía
"SOS" (with Grupo Frontera)	2024	—	42	—	—	—	—	—	—	AMPROFON: Gold	Mala Mía
"Coqueta" (with Grupo Frontera)	2024	— (Note: "Coqueta" did not enter the Billboard Hot 100, but peaked at number 23 on the Bubbling Under Hot 100 chart.)	26	13	1	26	3	16	115	AMPROFON: Diamond+Platinum+Gold	Mala Mía
"Aurora" (with Grupo Frontera, Óscar Maydon and Armenta)	2024	—	38	—	—	—	—	—	—	AMPROFON: Platinum	Mala Mía
"Como Capo" (with Clave Especial)	2025	—	25	11	—	—	—	8	127		Mija No Te Asustes
"GodFather"	2025	— (Note: "GodFather" did not enter the Billboard Hot 100, but peaked at number 9 on the Bubbling Under Hot 100 chart.)	16	9	—	—	—	—	—	AMPROFON: Platinum+Gold	111xpantia
"Ayy Weyy"	2025	—	26	15	—	—	—	—	—	AMPROFON: 3× Platinum	111xpantia
"Nocturno"	2025	—	34	21	—	—	—	—	—	AMPROFON: 2× Platinum	111xpantia
"Peliculiando"	2025	— (Note: "Peliculiando" did not enter the Billboard Hot 100, but peaked at number 2 on the Bubbling Under Hot 100 chart.)	11	5	—	—	—	—	—	AMPROFON: 2× Platinum+Gold	111xpantia
"Chavalitas"	2025	—	18	8	—	—	—	3	161	AMPROFON: Diamond+Platinum+Gold	111xpantia
"Ansiedad"	2025	— (Note: "Ansiedad" did not enter the Billboard Hot 100, but peaked at number 3 on the Bubbling Under Hot 100 chart.)	9	5	—	98	—	7	115	AMPROFON: Diamond+3× Platinum+Gold	111xpantia
"Tu Sancho"	2025	65	2	1	7	36	6	1	19	AMPROFON: 2× Diamond+3× Platinum	111xpantia
"Marlboro Rojo"	2025	64	1	1	—	52	23	1	33	AMPROFON: 2× Diamond+3× Platinum+Gold	111xpantia
"Chufulas"	2025	—	38	24	—	—	—	—	—	AMPROFON: Gold	111xpantia
"Chaka"	2025	—	32	14	—	—	—	—	—	AMPROFON: 2× Platinum	111xpantia
"Caperuza"	2025	—	24	13	—	—	—	15	—	AMPROFON: 3× Platinum+Gold	111xpantia
"Lokita" (with Anuel AA)	2025	—	43	—	—	—	—	—	—		111xpantia
"Como Tú"	2025	— (Note: "Como Tú" did not enter the Billboard Hot 100, but peaked at number 11 on the Bubbling Under Hot 100 chart.)	13	6	—	—	—	—	—		111xpantia
"Chrome Hearts" (with Gabito Ballesteros)	2025	—	22	11	—	—	—	—	—		No Se Llevan Serenatas (Deluxe)
"Pues Ya Ni Pedo" (with Chuyin)	2026	—	28	6	—	—	—	—	—		Los Locos Nunca Mueren
"Soy un Joven" (with Los Gemelos de Sinaloa)	2026	—	41	13	—	—	—	—	—		The Gemeliza
"—" denotes a recording that did not chart or was not released in that territory.

== Guest appearances ==
List of non-single guest appearances, with other performing artists, showing year released and album name
Title	Year	Other artist(s)	Album
"Fresas Con Crema"	2024	Luis R. Conriquez	Corridos Bélicos, Vol. IV

== Notes ==
- Note 1: Uses chart peak on the US Regional Mexican Airplay chart, before the US Hot Regional Mexican Songs chart was launched in 2025.

Notes for chart positions
