= List of Billboard Regional Mexican Albums number ones of 2023 =

The Regional Mexican Albums, published in Billboard magazine, is a record chart that features Latin music sales information for regional styles of Mexican music. This data are compiled by Nielsen SoundScan from a sample that includes music stores, music departments at department stores, verifiable sales from concert venues and track equivalent album units and streaming equivalent album units in the United States.

== Chart history ==
Issue date	Album	Artist(s)	Ref.
January 7	Dañado	Ivan Cornejo	
January 14	Dañado	Ivan Cornejo	
January 21	Dañado	Ivan Cornejo	
January 28	Sigan Hablando	Fuerza Regida	
February 4	Dañado	Ivan Cornejo	
February 11	Sigan Hablando	Fuerza Regida	
February 18	Dañado	Ivan Cornejo	
February 25	Dañado	Ivan Cornejo	
March 4	Dañado	Ivan Cornejo	
March 11	Dañado	Ivan Cornejo	
March 18	Dañado	Ivan Cornejo	
March 25	Dañado	Ivan Cornejo	
April 1	Pa Que Hablen	Fuerza Regida	
April 8	Pa Que Hablen	Fuerza Regida	
April 15	Pa Que Hablen	Fuerza Regida	
April 22	Pa Que Hablen	Fuerza Regida	
April 29	Pa Que Hablen	Fuerza Regida	
May 6	Pa Que Hablen	Fuerza Regida	
May 13	Desvelado	Eslabon Armado	
May 20	Desvelado	Eslabon Armado	
May 27	Desvelado	Eslabon Armado	
June 3	Desvelado	Eslabon Armado	
June 10	Desvelado	Eslabon Armado	
June 17	Desvelado	Eslabon Armado	
June 24	Desvelado	Eslabon Armado	
July 1	Desvelado	Eslabon Armado	
July 8	Génesis	Peso Pluma	
July 15	Génesis	Peso Pluma	
July 22	Génesis	Peso Pluma	
July 29	Génesis	Peso Pluma	
August 5	Génesis	Peso Pluma	
August 12	Génesis	Peso Pluma	
August 19	Génesis	Peso Pluma	
August 26	Génesis	Peso Pluma	
September 2	Génesis	Peso Pluma	
September 9	Génesis	Peso Pluma	
September 16	Génesis	Peso Pluma	
September 23	Génesis	Peso Pluma	
September 30	Génesis	Peso Pluma	
October 7	Génesis	Peso Pluma	
October 14	Génesis	Peso Pluma	
October 21	Génesis	Peso Pluma	
October 28	Génesis	Peso Pluma	
November 4	Pa Las Baby's y Belikeada	Fuerza Regida	
November 11	Génesis	Peso Pluma	
November 18	Génesis	Peso Pluma	
November 25	Génesis	Peso Pluma	
December 2	Génesis	Peso Pluma	
December 9	Génesis	Peso Pluma	
December 16	Génesis	Peso Pluma	
December 23	Génesis	Peso Pluma	
December 30	Génesis	Peso Pluma	
