= Pa Las Baby's y Belikeada =

2023 studio album by Fuerza Regida

Studio album by Fuerza Regida
- Released: October 20, 2023
- Genres: Regional Mexican; urban sierreño; corridos tumbados; norteño; reggaeton; trap; EDM
- Length: 83:00
- Languages: Spanish; English
- Labels: Street Mob; Rancho Humilde; Sony Latin
- Producers: Ángel Tumbado; Diego Armando Millán Medrando; Gabito Ballesteros; Gilberto Zavala; Jesús Ortíz Paz; Jimmy Humilde; José María Navarro; Juanpa Salzar; Manso; Marshmello; Miguel Armenta; Moises López; Synthetic; Twnty9

Fuerza Regida chronology
Sigan Hablando (2022)	Pa Las Baby's y Belikeada (2023)	Dolido Pero No Arrepentido (2024)

Singles from Pa Las Baby's y Belikeada
- 1. "TQM" Released: May 19, 2023; 2. "Sabor Fresa" Released: June 22, 2023; 3. "PRADAX" Released: October 18, 2023; 4. "Harley Quinn" Released: December 14, 2023

Pa Las Baby's y Belikeada is the seventh studio album by American regional Mexican band Fuerza Regida. It was released on October 20, 2023, through Rancho Humilde, Street Mob, and Sony Music Latin. The album follows the band's fifth and sixth studio albums released at the end of 2022, Pa Que Hablen and Sigan Hablando, and commercially successful singles such as "Bebe Dame", "CH y la Pizza", "Igualito a Mi Apá", and "Qué Onda".

The album of 30 songs is a regional Mexican album, with multiple genre variants, as well as different music genres, being used throughout the songs in the album. Its guest appearances include Marshmello, El Fantasma, Chino Pacas, María Becerra, Manuel Turizo, Gabito Ballesteros, Juanpa Salzar, Calle 24, Chuy Montana, Armenta, Chuyín, Jonathan Caro, Omar Ruiz, Los Dareyes de la Sierra, Turo Pacas, and Ángel Tumbado, with production being handled by several producers, as well as some of the respective artists.

Two consecutive singles from the album were released in the summer of 2023—"TQM" and "Sabor Fresa"—which appeared on the US Billboard Hot 100, peaking at numbers 34 and 26, respectively. After the album's release, music videos for some of the songs on the album were also uploaded, with a music video for "Harley Quinn" (with Marshmello) being uploaded following its increase in streams; it peaked at number 40 on the US Billboard Hot 100. In the United States, the album peaked at number 14 on the Billboard 200, selling 38,000 album-equivalent units in its first week. It had also peaked atop both US Top Latin Albums chart Regional Mexican Albums chart.

== Background ==
After the release of multiple singles since the beginning of 2023, Fuerza Regida announced on October 1, 2023, the album's release date. Jesús Ortíz Paz of the band revealed to Billboard, through a photo, that he had been working on the album in Malibu, California.

== Composition ==
An album of 30 songs, the genres and lyrics in the album vary. Mainly compromising of regional Mexican music, corridos tumbados and norteño music, the album also experiments house music, reggaeton, and drill rap. Production for the album was handled by Jesús Ortíz Paz, Jimmy Humilde and Miguel Armenta. Artists who have collaborated in at least one track in the album include Marshmello, El Fantasma, Chino Pacas, María Becerra, Manuel Turizo, Juanpa Salzar, Calle 24, Gabito Ballesteros, Chuy Montana, Armenta, Chuyín, Caro, Omar Ruiz, Los Dareyes de la Sierra, Turo Pacas, and Ángel Tumbado, who also handle production on their own songs on the album.

=== Songs ===
The album begins with the spoken word track "Bienvenida", which contains uncredited vocals by Kenia Os. Billboard described "Bienvenida": "Pa Las Baby’s [y Belikeada] opens with a dark and seductive tone, as a sultry voice professes her affection for corridos... then she appears to pick up a machine gun and shoot." In the song "Crazyz", the lyrics mainly focus on American actress Lana Rhoades, who also appears in the music video for "TQM". Lyrically, the songs "GDL", "CJNG", "3 Trokas", and "F's" are apologies for organized crime and are possibly directed to close alies of Mexican drug lord El Mencho.

Ortíz sings in English on the song "Dafuk", the only drill song on the album, which is the first time the group recorded and published a song in the English language and in the genre. In the song "Harley Quinn", with Marshmello, it experiments and blends house music with corridos bélicos and Sinaloan sierreño. "Freaky Freaky", with Calle 24 and Armenta, is a reggaeton track. The album also includes banda music, norteño music, and Mexican cumbias, in tracks such as "Zona de Comfort", "Puro MQueen" with Darey Castro, and "Desgraciada". The album also contains two previously released singles, and successful, "TQM" and "Sabor Fresa", with the latter on track 27 and "TQM" on track 28.

== Critical reception ==
Isabela Raygoza from Billboard commented on the release: "The album serves as a testament to the group’s evolution as they immerse themselves in la belikeada movement, embracing the realm of excess in all forms: women, power, wealth." The same author placed it on the magazine's list of "Best Latin Albums of 2023", adding that "[Pa Las Baby's y Belikeada] consolidated them as a force not only in Mexican music but also in pop."

Julianne Escobedo Shepherd from Pitchfork described Pa Las Baby's y Belikeada as a "30-song sierreño epic detailing a seedy millennial underworld of parties inside compounds with armed guards, high-stakes gamblers, and babes with big asses." The album was placed on number 46 on Rolling Stone's "The Best Latin Albums of 2023" list, adding that "Fuerza Régida prove that they’re unafraid to step out of their comfort zone."

== Commercial performance ==
In the United States, Pa Las Baby's y Belikeada debuted at number 14 on the Billboard 200 chart, with 38,000 album-equivalent units. It also debuted at number two on Top Latin Albums chart and atop the Regional Mexican Albums chart. In its 26th week, the album would peak atop the former chart, also returning to number one on the latter chart, with 24,000 additional units, making it the band's first number one album on the chart.

== Track listing ==
All tracks are written by Jesús Ortíz Paz, except where noted.

Pa Las Baby's Y Belikeada track listing
No.	Title	Writer(s)	Producer(s)	Length
1.	"Bienvenida"	Jesús Ortíz Paz	Jesús Ortíz Paz	0:34
2.	"FDVP"	Ortíz Paz; Ángel Utera; Miguel Armenta	Ortíz Paz; Miguel Armenta	2:05
3.	"GDL" (with El Fantasma)	Ángel Tumbado; Jesús Rodríguez Jr.; Jonathan Caro; Ortíz Paz; Armenta	Ortíz Paz; Angel Tumbado	2:44
4.	"Sobras y Mujeres"	Chuy Montana; Cristian Primera; Osbaldo Sanchez; Ortíz Paz	Ortíz Paz; Tumbado	2:38
5.	"3 Trokas"	Diego Millán; Tito Laija; Ortíz Paz; Rodríguez Jr.; Armenta	Ortíz Paz; Armenta	3:16
6.	"Crazyz"	Cristian Ávila García; Millán; Caro; Ortíz Paz; Sanchez; Armenta	Ortíz Paz; Tumbado	3:24
7.	"Chamba"	Brandon Daniel Candia Núñez; Ortíz Paz; Armenta	Ortíz Paz; Tumbado; Armenta	2:45
8.	"CJNG" (with Juanpa Salazar and Calle 24)	Juanpa Salazar; Millán; Ortíz Paz	Juanpa Salazar; Ortíz Paz; Armenta	2:11
9.	"F's" (with Gabito Ballesteros)	Gabriel Ballesteros Abril; Candia Núñez; Ortíz Paz	Gabito Ballesteros; Ortíz Paz	2:50
10.	"Excesos"	Ortíz Paz; Caro; Candia Núñez	Ortíz Paz; Tumbado	3:07
11.	"Polvos de Chanel" (with Chuy Montana)	Ortíz Paz; Montana	Moises López; Ortíz Paz; Tumbado	2:15
12.	"PRADAX" (with María Becerra)	Adrian Maldonado; Armenta	Ortíz Paz; Tumbado; Armenta; Twnty9	3:19
13.	"Zona de Comfort"	Ortíz Paz; Luis Ernesto Vega Carvajal	Ortíz Paz; Tumbado; Armenta; Twnty9	3:11
14.	"Dafuk"	FadeMeUpChino; Ortíz Paz; Rodríguez Jr.; Jozzy; Moises López	Ortíz Paz; Synthetic; Kaaj; Bass; YUZU	2:31
15.	"Harley Quinn" (with Marshmello)	Daniel Gutiérrez; Ortíz Paz; Rodríguez Jr.; Caro; Armenta; Lopez; Sánchez	Marshmello; Munk; Ortíz Paz; Armenta; Tumbado	2:23
16.	"Freaky Freaky" (with Calle 24 and Armenta)	Ortíz Paz; Armenta	Ortíz Paz; Armenta; Synthetic; Manso; José María Navarro	2:31
17.	"Barbiez"	Ortíz Paz; Gutiérrez; Caro	Ortíz Paz; Tumbado; Armenta	2:46
18.	"Cucu"	Ortíz Paz; Gutiérrez; Caro	Ortíz Paz; Tumbado; Armenta	2:49
19.	"Inmortal" (with Chuyin)	Ortíz Paz; Millán; Rodriguez Jr.; Armenta; Sanchez	Diego Millán; Ortíz Paz	2:17
20.	"Plvo Blnco" (with Jonathan Caro and Chino Pacas)	Caro	Ortíz Paz; Tumbado	2:46
21.	"Chichis" (with Omar Ruiz)	Millán; Rodriguez Jr.; Armenta; Caro	Ortíz Paz; Tumbado	3:06
22.	"Don Merfoz"	Ortíz Paz; Armenta	Ortíz Paz; Tumbado; Armenta	2:36
23.	"Puro MQueen" (with Darey Castro)	Alexis Fierro; Ortíz Paz	Ortíz Paz; López	2:57
24.	"Bien Chaka" (with Turo Pacas)	Alexis Fierro; Ortíz Paz	Ortíz Paz; Tumbado	2:32
25.	"Me Jalé Pal Antro"	Ortíz Paz; Rodríguez Jr.; Salazar; Armenta; Laija	Ortíz Paz; Tumbado; Armenta	2:46
26.	"Tu Kiss" (with Ángel Tumbado)	Ortíz Paz; Tumbado	Ortíz Paz; Tumbado	2:52
27.	"Sabor Fresa"	Ortíz Paz; Ureta; Gutiérrez; Millán; Caro; Armenta	Jimmy Humilde; Tumbado	2:36
28.	"TQM"	Candia Núñez; Ortíz Paz; Armenta; Cristian Humberto Ávila Vega	Ortíz Paz; Armenta; Tumbado; Humilde	2:38
29.	"Desgraciada"	Candia Núñez; Ortíz Paz	Ortíz Paz	3:54
30.	"Una Cerveza" (with Manuel Turizo)	Fierro; Ortíz Paz	Ortíz Paz; Tumbado; Armenta	4:39
Total length:				83:00

== Personnel ==
Credits adapted from Tidal.

- Jesús Ortíz Paz – vocals, songwriting (tracks 1–11, 13–19, 22–30), production (except track 27)
- Moises López – songwriting (tracks 14, 15), production (tracks 11, 23)
- Kenia Os – vocals (track 1)
- Miguel Armenta – songwriting (tracks 2–3, 5–7, 12, 15–16, 19, 21–22, 25, 27–28), production (tracks 2, 5, 7, 8, 12, 13, 15–18, 22, 25, 28, 30)
- Ángel Tumbado – songwriting (tracks 3, 26), production (tracks 3, 4, 6, 7, 10–13, 15, 17, 18, 20–22, 24–28, 30)
- Jimmy Humilde – production (tracks 27, 28)
- Gaby Vilar – A&R coordinator
- Txema Rosique – A&R director
- Erick Urbana Toranzo – mastering engineer (tracks 1–13, 15–30)
- Daniel Lebrija – mixing engineer (tracks 1–13, 15–30)
- Oliver García Cerón – mixing engineer (tracks 1–13, 15–30)
- Edgar Herrera – mastering engineer (track 14), mixing engineer (track 14)
- Toptear – recording engineer

== Charts ==
=== Weekly charts ===
Weekly chart performance for Pa Las Baby's y Belikeada
Chart (2023–2024)	Peak position
US Billboard 200	14
US Regional Mexican Albums (Billboard)	1
US Top Latin Albums (Billboard)	1

=== Year-end charts ===
Year-end chart performance for Pa Las Baby's y Belikeada
Chart (2024)	Position
US Billboard 200	27

== Certifications ==
Certifications for Pa Las Baby's y Belikeada
Region	Certification	Certified units/sales
Mexico (AMPROFON)	3× Platinum	420,000^{‡}
United States (RIAA)	2× Diamond (Latin)	1,200,000^{‡}
^{‡} Sales+streaming figures based on certification alone.
