= Pa Que Hablen =

Studio album by Fuerza Regida
- Released: December 30, 2022
- Genre: Regional Mexican
- Length: 34:48
- Language: Spanish
- Label: Sony Music Latin; Street Mob; Rancho Humilde

Fuerza Regida chronology
Del Barrio Hasta Aquí, Vol. 2 (2021)	Pa Que Hablen (2022)	Sigan Hablando (2022)

Singles from Pa Que Hablen
- 1. "CH y la Pizza" Released: December 1, 2022; 2. "Igualito a Mi Apá" Released: January 27, 2023

Pa Que Hablen (transl. So Y'all Can Talk) is the fifth studio album by American regional Mexican band Fuerza Regida. It was released on December 30, 2022, along with Sigan Hablando, through Sony Music Latin, Street Mob and Rancho Humilde. This album, along with the latter marks their first to feature Moisés López. It contains guest appearances from Junior H, Natanael Cano, Herencia de Patrones, Peso Pluma, Santa Fe Klan, Grupo Marca Registrada and Eslabon Armado, among others.

== Background and release ==
In August 2022, Fuerza Regida signed a record deal with Sony Music Latin through a partnership with long-time label Rancho Humilde. Pa Que Hablen was announced in November 2022, which scheduled to be released at the end of 2022 as an album of 26 songs. Before the album's release, the band thought that "26 songs in one album was a but much", in which their manager, Jimmy Humilde, suggested that the album should be split into two albums, with 13 tracks each. It was released on December 30, 2022, along with their sixth album Sigan Hablando, which contains the remaining 13 tracks that were split.

== Commercial performance ==
On the issue dated January 14, 2023, Pa Que Hablen debuted at number five on the US Top Latin Albums chart, with 10,000 album-equivalent units which consisted of 13.6 million streams in the United States.

== Track listing ==
Pa Que Hablen track listing
No.	Title	Length
1.	"Mi Vecindario"	2:53
2.	"Gente Nueva" (with Tito Torbellino Jr.)	2:21
3.	"Mi Terre CLN" (with Juanpa Salazar)	2:52
4.	"Whiskey Con Agua" (with Junior H)	2:06
5.	"CH y la Pizza" (with Natanael Cano)	2:17
6.	"Francotirador" (with Herencia de Patrones and Calle 24)	3:11
7.	"Igualito a Mi Apá" (with Peso Pluma)	2:47
8.	"Una Raya Más al Tigre" (with Santa Fe Klan)	3:11
9.	"Más Bélico Que el Diablo" (with Ángel Tumbado)	2:57
10.	"Modo Maldito" (with Grupo Marca Registrada)	2:15
11.	"Otro Amanecer" (with Ángel Ureta)	1:58
12.	"Tu Ventana" (with Marca MP)	3:07
13.	"Aretes" (with Eslabon Armado)	2:53
Total length:		34:48

== Charts ==
=== Weekly charts ===
Weekly chart performance for Pa Que Hablen
Chart (2023)	Peak position
US Billboard 200	60
US Regional Mexican Albums (Billboard)	1
US Top Latin Albums (Billboard)	4

=== Year-end charts ===
2023 year-end chart performance for Pa Que Hablen
Chart (2023)	Position
US Billboard 200	147
US Regional Mexican Albums (Billboard)	4
US Top Latin Albums (Billboard)	8

== Certifications ==
Certifications for Pa Que Hablen
Region	Certification	Certified units/sales
Mexico (AMPROFON)	3× Platinum	420,000^{‡}
United States (RIAA)	11× Platinum (Latin)	660,000^{‡}
^{‡} Sales+streaming figures based on certification alone.
