= El Azul (song) =

Single by Junior H and Peso Pluma
- Language: Spanish
- Released: 10 February 2023
- Genre: Regional Mexican
- Label: Warner Music Latina; Rancho Humilde; Prajin Parlay
- Songwriter: Brandon Daniel Candia Nuñez
- Producer: Jimmy Humilde

Junior H singles chronology
| "Fin de Semana" (2023) | "El Azul" (2023) | "Ya Corazón" (2023) |

Peso Pluma singles chronology
| "Igualito a Mi Apá" (2023) | "El Azul" (2023) | "Por Las Noches" (remix) (2023) |

Music video
- "El Azul" on YouTube

"El Azul" is a song performed by Mexican singer-songwriter Junior H and rapper Peso Pluma. It was released on 10 February 2023, through Rancho Humilde, Prajin Parlay, and Worms Music, and was distributed by Warner Music Latina. The song was written by Brandon Daniel Candia Nuñez and was produced by Jimmy Humilde.

== Composition ==
The song's title is named after Juan José Esparragoza Moreno, who is commonly referred as "El Azul". The lyrics in the song are about the Mexican drug war, mainly about working for Mexican drug lord El Chapo, using the 701 moniker, in lyrics such as "En la sangre traigo el 701 / Melena de león, pues vengo de uno."

== Impact ==
The lyric "Como el de aquellos botones" was censored from the song by streaming service Spotify on late April for its allusion to the drug fentanyl. Previous Peso Pluma songs such as "El Belicon" and "Igualito a Mi Apá" also make such references to cartels, which may be the reason Pluma received death threats by the Jalisco New Generation Cartel and had to cancel his October 14 show in Tijuana.

== Music video ==
A music video was uploaded on February 9, 2023, through Rancho Humilde's official YouTube channel. The video was directed by Johnny Ragr and produced by Jimmy Humilde.

== Charts ==
=== Weekly charts ===
Chart performance for "El Azul"
| Chart (2023) | Peak position |
|---|---|
| Global 200 (Billboard) | 23 |
| Mexico (Billboard) | 3 |
| US Billboard Hot 100 | 55 |
| US Hot Latin Songs (Billboard) | 8 |

=== Year-end charts ===
Year-end chart performance for "El Azul"
| Chart (2023) | Position |
|---|---|
| Global 200 (Billboard) | 99 |
| US Hot Latin Songs (Billboard) | 15 |

== Certifications ==
Certifications for "El Azul"
| Region | Certification | Certified units/sales |
|---|---|---|
| United States (RIAA) | 42× Platinum (Latin) | 2,520,000^{‡} |
^{‡} Sales+streaming figures based on certification alone.
