= Di Que Sí (song) =

Single by Grupo Marca Registrada and Grupo Frontera

from the album Don't Stop the Magic
- English title: "Say Yes"
- Released: 3 February 2023
- Genre: Regional Mexican; Tejano; norteño cumbia
- Length: 3:10
- Label: Interscope; RB
- Songwriter: Édgar Barrera
- Producer: Édgar Barrera

Grupo Marca Registrada singles chronology
"El Pickles" (2023)	"Di Que Sí" (2023)	"Sin Rencores" (2023)

Grupo Frontera singles chronology
"Bebe Dame" (2022)	"Di Que Sí" (2023)	"Dame Un Chance" (2023)

Music video
- "Di Que Sí" on YouTube

"Di Que Sí" (English: "Say Yes") is a song by regional Mexican band Grupo Marca Registrada and American norteño band Grupo Frontera. It was released on 3 February 2023 through Interscope and RB Music, as the sixth single on the former's album Don't Stop the Magic (2023). The song was written and produced entirely by Édgar Barrera and is Grupo Marca Registrada's most successful single and highest-charted song, peaking at number 89 on the Billboard Hot 100.

== Background ==
Following the success of Grupo Frontera's collaboration with Fuerza Regida on "Bebe Dame", the band released "Di Que Sí" with Grupo Marca Registrada which was originally sent to the latter by Edgar Barrera, stating that "it was made for [them]." and both groups knew that the song was going to be a hit.

== Compostition ==
Musically, "Di Que Sí" is a Tejano and a norteño cumbia song, about a man who is trying to put away his regrets and calls an ex-partner, who were in the wrong and tries to reconcile their relationship. The song was inspired by Bobby Pulido's song "Desvelado".

== Commercial performance ==
"Di Que Sí" debuted on the Billboard Hot 100 at number 99 in the week ending on April 29, 2023. It later peaked at number 89 on the chart in the week ending on May 6, 2023, marking Grupo Marca Registrada's first time and Frontera's fourth time on the chart. The song also appeared on the Hot Latin Songs and Latin Airplay charts, peaking at number 15 and number three, respectively. The song also peaked at number 11 on the Mexico Songs chart and number one on the Regional Mexican Airplay chart, marking Marca Registrada's debut on the latter chart and Frontera's third consecutive number-one on the latter chart in a row. Also appearing on the Billboard Global 200 and the Global Excl. US charts, "Di Que Sí" peaked on number 152 and number 190 in each chart, respectively.

== Music video ==
A music video was released on the same day of the song's release, on Grupo Frontera's YouTube channel. Filmed in Monterrey and directed by Abelardo Baez, it shows both groups performing at the Macroplaza, with fans watching the performance. The music video garnered over five million views in its first week.

== Charts ==
=== Weekly charts ===
Weekly chart performance for "Di Que Sí"
Chart (2023)	Peak position
Global 200 (Billboard)	152
Mexico (Billboard)	11
US Billboard Hot 100	89
US Hot Latin Songs (Billboard)	15
US Latin Airplay (Billboard)	3
US Regional Mexican Airplay (Billboard)	1

=== Year-end charts ===
Year-end chart performance for "Di Que Sí"
Chart (2023)	Position
US Hot Latin Songs (Billboard)	42

== See also ==
- List of Latin songs on the Billboard Hot 100
- List of number-one Billboard Regional Mexican Songs of 2023
