= El Fantasma (singer) =

Alexander García
- Also known as: El Fantasma
- Born: Alexander García; December 2, 1990 (age 35); San José de Cañas, Durango, Mexico
- Genres: Regional Mexican; banda; norteño; sierreño; mariachi
- Occupations: Singer; songwriter
- Instruments: Vocals; guitar
- Years active: 2016–present
- Website: Official website

Alexander García (born December 2, 1990), known professionally as El Fantasma, is a Mexican singer-songwriter of regional Mexican music, particularly known for his corridos. He was a finalist at the 2019 Billboard Latin Music Awards.

== Life ==
García was born in Las Cañas, Durango. He worked as a gardener for six years before becoming a singer.

He performs regional Mexican music; especially corrido songs about hardworking people. On social media, fans nickname him the "King from the Underground."

His nickname began because his friends and family call him El Fanta. He was a finalist at the 2019 Billboard Latin Music Awards.

In 2019, García's single "Encantadora" charted No. 1 on Regional Mexican Airplay. On August 14, 2021, his single "Soy Buen Amigo" also charted No. 1 on Regional Mexican Airplay. It also charted 27 on Hot Latin Songs. In October 2023, he appeared in "GDL", a song with Fuerza Regida from their album Pa Las Baby's y Belikeada.

== Discography ==
- 2016 "Equipo armado"
- 2017 "En el camino"
- 2018 "Dolor y amor"
- 2019 "El circo"
- 2020 "Puerta abierta" and "Guárdame esta noche"
- 2023 "Entre amigos"
