= TQM (song) =

Single by Fuerza Regida

from the album Pa Las Baby's y Belikeada
- Language: Spanish
- Released: May 19, 2023
- Genre: Regional Mexican; urban sierreño; corrido tumbado
- Length: 2:38
- Label: Rancho Humilde; Street Mob; Sony Music Latin
- Songwriters: Brandon Daniel Candia Núñez; Jesús Ortíz Paz; Miguel Armenta; Cristian Humberto Ávila Vega
- Producers: Ortíz Paz; Armenta; Ángel Tumbado; Jimmy Humilde

Fuerza Regida singles chronology
"Pariente" (2023)	"TQM" (2023)	"Sabor Fresa" (2023)

Music video
- "TQM" on YouTube

"TQM" (acronym of "Te Quiero Mucho"; English: "I Love You Very Much") is a song performed by American regional Mexican band Fuerza Regida. It was written by Brandon Daniel Candia Núñez, Miguel Armenta, Cristian Humberto Ávila Vega and the group's lead singer Jesús Ortíz Paz, and was produced by Paz, Armenta, Ángel Tumbado and Jimmy Humilde. It was released on May 19, 2023, through Rancho Humilde, Street Mob Records and Sony Music Latin, as the lead single for the group's eighth studio album, Pa Las Baby's y Belikeada.

== Background and promotion ==
On April 19, 2023, Ortíz Paz uploaded a video to his TikTok profile in which he showed a snippet of the song, specifically the beginning of the chorus. The video and its audio went viral, being used approximately 110 thousand times. Later, Paz published a cell phone number on his social networks, which, when dialed, would play another snippet of the song, which generated a month-long expectation among his followers.

== Composition and lyrics ==
Musically, the song is a corrido tumbado with arrangements of mountain and urban music. Lyrically, it describes the protagonist's lavish lifestyle, with references to designer clothing, smoking marijuana, and going to strip clubs. He is often called "TQM" and is seen driving a BMW, enjoying expensive perfumes, and earning money through a man named Ivan. He talks about wanting to be with a girl he's interested in and mentions that he likes Travis Scott's music and wants to meet Kylie Jenner. Despite all this, he remains loyal to his "mafia" and continues to generate money and success. The lyrics include, "Me dicen TQM cuando ven el BM / Voy partiendo el queso de JGL / Siempre oloroso, le lavo, me quieren / Haciendo feria, consigna de Iván y vienen".

== Critical reception ==
El Debate said of the release: "(Fuerza Regida) has demonstrated once again its ability to capture modern life through its music, mixing the urban rhythms and melodies of banda music, with authentic and motivating lyrics". El Imparcial published: "('TQM') consolidates the power of the band's music and its connection with fans". Journalist and host La Chicuela said on her website: "The «TQM» phenomenon demonstrates that Fuerza Regida continues to be one of the most impactful forces in the Mexican regional music scene. With its undeniable talent and its ability to connect with their fans, there is no doubt that Fuerza Regida will continue to dominate the charts".

== Commercial performance ==
After having gone viral on TikTok before its release, the song was well received on streaming platforms since on its release day it accumulated more than 13.1 million views on all platforms. It charted in the top 20 on Spotify's global chart and in the top 10 on Apple Music in its first hours of release. The song debuted the week of May 28, 2023 at number 35 on the United States Billboard Hot 100 chart — being their second highest-ranking song below the single "Bebe Dame" — it also debuted at number 19. of the Global 200 and at number 5 on the Hot Latin Songs and Mexico Songs respectively.

== Music video ==
A music video was released at the time of the song's release as a single, it was directed by DBM and recorded in a luxurious residence in the Los Angeles, California area with the appearance of American actress Lana Rhoades. On its premiere day the video had 6 million views on YouTube and was placed at number 4 in trends in Mexico, for weeks later to occupy position 2.

== Charts ==
=== Weekly charts ===
Weekly chart performance for "TQM"
Chart (2023)	Peak position
Global 200 (Billboard)	15
Mexico (Billboard)	2
US Billboard Hot 100	34
US Hot Latin Songs (Billboard)	5

=== Year-end charts ===
Year-end chart performance for "TQM"
Chart (2023)	Position
Global 200 (Billboard)	142
US Hot Latin Songs (Billboard)	13

== Certifications ==
Certifications for "TQM"
Region	Certification	Certified units/sales
Mexico (AMPROFON)	Diamond+4× Platinum	1,260,000^{‡}
United States (RIAA)	37× Platinum (Latin)	2,220,000^{‡}
^{‡} Sales+streaming figures based on certification alone.
