= Sabor Fresa =

2023 single by Fuerza Regida

Single by Fuerza Regida

from the album Pa Las Baby's y Belikeada
- Language: Spanish
- Released: June 22, 2023
- Genre: Regional Mexican; urban sierreño; corrido tumbado
- Length: 2:36
- Label: Rancho Humilde; Street Mob; Sony Music Latin
- Songwriters: Ángel Ureta; Daniel Gutiérrez; Diego Millán; Jonathan Caro; Jesús Ortíz Paz; Miguel Armenta
- Producers: Ángel Tumbado; Jimmy Humilde

Fuerza Regida singles chronology
"TQM" (2023)	"Sabor Fresa" (2023)	"Tiki Taka Toko" (2023)

Music video
- "Sabor Fresa" on YouTube

"Sabor Fresa" (English: Strawberry Flavor) is a song performed by American regional Mexican band Fuerza Regida. It was released as a single on 22 June 2023 through Rancho Humilde, Street Mob Records and Sony Music Latin, as the second single from the group's eighth studio album, Pa Las Baby's y Belikeada.

The song was written by Ángel Ureta, Daniel Gutiérrez, Diego Millán, Jonathan Caro, Jesús Ortíz Paz and Miguel Armenta, and was produced by Ángel Tumbado y Jimmy Humilde.

== Commercial performance ==
In the week of 2 July 2023, the song debuted and reached number 3 on Hot Latin Songs in the United States, number 26 on the Billboard Hot 100, tied with "Ella Baila Sola" by Eslabon Armado and Peso Pluma, as the second highest debut on the list for a regional Mexican song—both below "un x100to" by Grupo Frontera.

== Music video ==
A music video for the song was uploaded on June 22, on the group's official YouTube channel, and was produced by Ortíz Paz and Jimmy Humilde. The video stars the members of the band, where they who is seen at party in a mansion with women. Ortíz Paz plays as a plastic surgeon, who treats these women in his office at the beginning of the video clip. He also, during the video, crushes a purple tarantula and when he drags his foot he leaves a blood stain of the same color. This gesture was related to Mexican singer Peso Pluma, who used tarantulas and the color purple as part of the aesthetic of his album Génesis, released on the same day as the "Sabor Fresa" release. Therefore, it was assumed that there might have been a feud between them despite having shared the success of "Igualito a Mi Apá". The video accumulated 1.4 million views on YouTube.

== Charts ==
=== Weekly charts ===
Weekly chart performance for "Sabor Fresa"
Chart (2023)	Peak position
Global 200 (Billboard)	16
Mexico (Billboard)	2
US Billboard Hot 100	26
US Hot Latin Songs (Billboard)	3

=== Year-end charts ===
Year-end chart performance for "Sabor Fresa"
Chart (2023)	Position
Global 200 (Billboard)	177
US Hot Latin Songs (Billboard)	18

== Certifications ==
Certifications for "Sabor Fresa"
Region	Certification	Certified units/sales
Mexico (AMPROFON)	2× Diamond+2× Platinum	1,680,000^{‡}
United States (RIAA)	37× Platinum (Latin)	2,220,000^{‡}
^{‡} Sales+streaming figures based on certification alone.
