= Sigan Hablando =

Studio album by Fuerza Regida
- Released: December 30, 2022
- Genre: Regional Mexican
- Length: 44:30
- Language: Spanish
- Label: Sony Music Latin; Street Mob; Rancho Humilde

Fuerza Regida chronology
Pa Que Hablen (2022)	Sigan Hablando (2022)	Pa Las Baby's y Belikeada (2023)

Singles from Sigan Hablando
- 1. "Chrysler 300" Released: November 4, 2022; 2. "Prefiero Empedarme" Released: November 18, 2022; 3. "Bebe Dame" Released: December 16, 2022

Sigan Hablando (transl. Keep Talking) is the sixth studio album by American regional Mexican band Fuerza Regida. It was released on December 30, 2022, through Sony Music Latin, Street Mob and Rancho Humilde. It contains 13 tracks which were split from the intended 26-track album Pa Que Hablen, which was released on the same day, as both albums marked the first to feature Moisés López. Guest appearances include Edén Muñoz, Alfredo Olivas and Grupo Frontera, among others.

== Background and release ==
The band announced Pa Que Hablen in November 2022, which was scheduled to be released at the end of 2022 as an album of 26 songs. Before it was released, the band thought that "26 songs in one album was a but much". Their manager, Jimmy Humilde, suggested that the album should be split into two albums, with 13 tracks each. The remaining 13 tracks were then published under the album titled Sigan Hablando.

== Commercial performance ==
On the issue dated January 14, 2023, Sigan Hablando debuted at number six on the US Top Latin Albums chart, with 9,000 album-equivalent units which consisted of 13.2 million streams in the United States. It peaked atop the US Regional Mexican Albums on the issue dated January 28, 2023, with 12,000 album-equivalent units.

== Track listing ==
Sigan Hablando track listing
No.	Title	Length
1.	"Se Logró"	4:28
2.	"Fiestas, Tragos, Noche Loca"	2:40
3.	"Y Me Verán" (with Edén Muñoz)	3:06
4.	"Nunca Se Imaginó" (with Edicion Especial)	3:39
5.	"Me Tocó Morir" (with Alfredo Olivas)	2:25
6.	"El Diablo" (with Calle 24)	4:07
7.	"Soy el Pirata" (with Edgardo Nuñez)	2:55
8.	"Soy Manuel" (with Tomás Ballardo)	2:51
9.	"Chrysler 300"	2:57
10.	"Bebe Dame" (with Grupo Frontera)	4:32
11.	"Un Idiota"	3:10
12.	"Prefiero Empedarme"	3:13
13.	"50 Mentadas"	4:27
Total length:		44:30

== Charts ==
=== Weekly charts ===
Weekly chart performance for Sigan Hablando
Chart (2023)	Peak position
US Billboard 200	65
US Regional Mexican Albums (Billboard)	1
US Top Latin Albums (Billboard)	2

=== Year-end charts ===
2023 year-end chart performance for Sigan Hablando
Chart (2023)	Position
US Regional Mexican Albums (Billboard)	5
US Top Latin Albums (Billboard)	12

== Certifications ==
Certifications for Sigan Hablando
Region	Certification	Certified units/sales
Mexico (AMPROFON)	Platinum	140,000^{‡}
United States (RIAA)	7× Platinum (Latin)	420,000^{‡}
^{‡} Sales+streaming figures based on certification alone.
