= Grupo Marca Registrada =

Regional Mexican band

- Also known as: Marca Registrada
- Origin: Culiacán, Sinaloa, Mexico
- Genres: Regional Mexican • Pacific norteño • electronic dance music
- Years active: 2013–present
- Members: Fidel Oswaldo Castro; Luis Fernando Medina; Fidel Jiménez; Ángel Móndragon
- Past members: Álvaro Álvarez

Grupo Marca Registrada, or simply Marca Registrada, is a regional Mexican band from Culiacán, Sinaloa. The band consists of lead singer, composer and accordionist Fidel Castro, drummer Luis Fernando Medina, bassist Fidel Jiménez and backing vocalist and guitarist Ángel Móndragon.

Their 2023 single "Di Que Sí" with Grupo Frontera charted at 89 on the Billboard Hot 100, 15th on Hot Latin Songs and number one on the Regional Mexican Airplay charts. Their single "El Rescate" with Junior H also charted on the Billboard Global 200 for seven weeks, peaking at 153.

The band has also released collaborations with Carín León, Fuerza Regida, Edición Especial, Enigma Norteño and Gerardo Ortíz among others.

Their 2023 album Don't Stop the Magic peaked at number 187 on the US Billboard 200.

In 2024, the band released a regional Mexican version of "Andar Conmigo" by and with Julieta Venegas.

== Discography ==
=== Charted albums ===
- Don't Stop the Magic (2023) – No. 187 US Billboard 200

=== Singles ===
List of singles, with selected chart positions, and album name
Title	Year	Peak chart positions							Certifications	Album
Title	Year	MEX	ECU	SPA	US	US Latin	US Reg. Mex	WW	Certifications	Album
"Sigan Atentos"	2020	—	—	—	—	—	—	—	RIAA: Platinum (Latin)	Non-album singles
"Eres Mi Crush"	2021	—	—	—	—	—	—	—	RIAA: Platinum (Latin)	Non-album singles
"Si Fuera Facil"	2022	19	—	—	—	29	—	—	RIAA: Platinum (Latin)	Don't Stop the Magic
"Solo Me Dejaste"	2022	—	—	—	—	40	—	—		Don't Stop the Magic
"El Rescate" (with Junior H)	2022	8	—	—	— (Note: "El Rescate" did not enter the Billboard Hot 100, but peaked at number 24 on the Bubbling Under Hot 100 chart.)	18	—	153	RIAA: Gold (Latin)	Don't Stop the Magic
"Puro Campeón" (with Luis R. Conriquez)	2022	25	—	—	—	28	—	—		Don't Stop the Magic
"Di Que Sí" (with Grupo Frontera)	2023	11	—	—	89	15	1	152		Don't Stop the Magic
"Elovrga" (with Alex Favela and Joaquin Medina)	2023	3	—	—	—	46	—	82		Non-album single
"Alucin" (with Eugenio and Sebastian Esquivel)	2023	12	14	38	—	29	16	123	AMPROFON: 2× Platinum; PROMUSICAE: Gold; RIAA: 2× Platinum (Latin)	Alucina2
"Bling Bling" (with Octavio Cuadras or remix with Maluma)	2023	—	—	—	—	39	12	—		Don Juan Season 2
"Anda Bien el Nene" (with Óscar Maydon)	2024	—	—	—	—	—	—	—	AMPROFON: Gold	Non-album singles
"Bandida" (with La Adictiva and Montana)	2024	—	—	—	—	— (Note: "Bandida" did not enter the Hot Latin Songs chart, but peaked at number two on the Latin Airplay chart.)	1	—		Non-album singles
"La Guerita"	2024	—	—	—	—	38	—	—		Non-album singles
