= CH y la Pizza =

Single by Fuerza Regida and Natanael Cano

from the album Pa Que Hablen
- Language: Spanish
- English title: "CH and Pizza"
- Released: December 1, 2022
- Genre: Regional Mexican; sierreño; corrido tumbado
- Length: 2:16
- Label: Rancho Humilde; Street Mob; Los CT; Sony Latin
- Songwriters: Daniel Candia; Miguel Armenta
- Producer: Jesús Ortiz Paz

Fuerza Regida singles chronology
"911 (En Vivo)" (2022)	"CH y la Pizza" (2022)	"Bebe Dame" (2022)

Natanael Cano singles chronology
"AMG" (2022)	"CH y la Pizza" (2022)	"Kilos de H (En vivo)" (2022)

Music video
- "Ch y la Pizza" on YouTube

"CH y la Pizza" is a song recorded and performed by the American group Fuerza Regida and the Mexican rapper Natanael Cano. It was written by Daniel Candia and Miguel Armenta and produced by Jesús Ortíz Paz, who is also the group's vocalist. It was released on December 1, 2022, as the lead single for the former's seventh studio album Pa Que Hablen (2022), through Rancho Humilde, Street Mob Records, Los CT and distributed by Sony Music Latin.

On March 29, 2023, a Sinaloan banda version of the song performed solo by the group was released.

== Composition ==
Musically, the single is a corrido tumbado with arrangements of sierreña and norteño music with tuba, the lyrics make references to drug trafficking in Mexico, an apology for crime and santería. The title of the song is a phrase that is phonetically similar to Chapiza, a given name to the Sinaloa Cartel, a way of mentioning the criminal group that serves the children of capo Joaquín "El Chapo" Guzmán Loera. The bosses of Iván Archivaldo Guzmán Salazar and Ismael Zambada García are also mentioned, and the theme of Santería is also touched on in a verse sung by Cano, a religion to which he explained that he was not a participant and that at the time of recording the song he had disputes with Ortíz Paz for not wanting to use the phrase.

== Music video ==
An official video clip directed by the DBM company premiered on December 2, 2023, on Fuerza Regida's YouTube channel at the same time that both artists performed it live at the Crypto.com Arena in Los Ángeles, before a full house.

== Chart performance ==
It reached positions on charts such as number 68 on the Billboard Hot 100, number 39 on the Billboard Global 200 and number 9 on Hot Latin Songs, while it was top 10 in Mexico.

== Charts ==
=== Weekly charts ===
Weekly chart performance for "CH y la Pizza"
Chart (2023)	Peak position
Global 200 (Billboard)	39
Mexico (Billboard)	7
US Billboard Hot 100	68
US Hot Latin Songs (Billboard)	9

=== Year-end charts ===
Year-end chart performance for "CH y la Pizza"
Chart (2023)	Position
Global 200 (Billboard)	179
US Hot Latin Songs (Billboard)	29

== Certifications ==
Certifications for "CH y la Pizza"
Region	Certification	Certified units/sales
Mexico (AMPROFON)	2× Diamond+3× Platinum+Gold	1,890,000^{‡}
^{‡} Sales+streaming figures based on certification alone.
