= Igualito a Mi Apá =

Single by Fuerza Regida and Peso Pluma

from the album Pa Que Hablen
- Language: Spanish
- English title: "Just Like My Dad"
- Released: 27 January 2023
- Genre: Regional Mexican; sierreño; corrido tumbado
- Length: 2:46
- Label: Rancho Humilde; Street Mob Records; Prajin Parlay; Sony Music Latin
- Songwriters: Ángel Ureta; Diego Millán; Hassan Kabande; Jesús Ortiz Paz; Juan Pablo Salazar; Miguel Armenta
- Producers: Ortiz Paz; Armenta

Fuerza Regida singles chronology
"Gente Nueva" (2023)	"Igualito a Mi Apá" (2023)	"Tu Ventana" (2023)

Peso Pluma singles chronology
"PRC" (2023)	"Igualito a Mi Apá" (2023)	"El Azul" (2023)

Music video
- "Igualito a Mi Apá" on YouTube

"Igualito a Mi Apá" (English: "Just Like My Dad") is a song by the Mexican American band Fuerza Regida and the Mexican singer and rapper Peso Pluma. It was written by the singer, together with Ángel Ureta, Diego Millán, Juan Pablo Salazar Pérez, Miguel Armenta and Jesús Ortíz Paz and produced by the latter two. It was released as the sixth single from Fuerza Regida's seventh studio album Pa Que Hablen (2022), through Rancho Humilde, Street Mob Records, Prajin Parlay and distributed by Sony Music Latin.

The song is one of the biggest hits of both artists since it managed to position itself on the Billboard Hot 100 list in the United States at number 80, also reaching other charts such as the Global 200 and Hot Latin Songs.

== Music and lyrics ==
Musically, it is a corrido tumbado with arrangements of Sierreña music in which the sound of trumpets and the requinto stands out. The lyrics have war themes and an apology for organized crime, something common in that genre. It is about a person who is dedicated to this type of crime and who inherited power and respect from his father, alluding to the capo Joaquín "El Chapo" Guzmán and his children.

== Music video ==
The release of the single was accompanied by the publication of a music video released on January 27, 2023, on the group's official YouTube channel. The video was produced by Ortíz Paz and Jimmy Humilde and directed by Miguel from the DMB production company. The video clip stars the members of the group and Pluma, as well as cameos by Jimmy and Codiciado. In the images you can see the protagonists enjoying a party with women and some admirers. In its first three days it accumulated 2.5 million views on YouTube.

== Charts ==
Chart performance for "Igualito a Mi Apá"
Chart (2023)	Peak position
Global 200 (Billboard)	118
Mexico Songs (Billboard)	20
US Billboard Hot 100	80
US Hot Latin Songs (Billboard)	16

== Certifications ==
Certifications for "Igualito a Mi Apá"
Region	Certification	Certified units/sales
Mexico (AMPROFON)	4× Platinum+Gold	630,000^{‡}
^{‡} Sales+streaming figures based on certification alone.
