= RIAA certification =

Sales certification from the Recording Industry Association of America

Recording Industry Association of America (RIAA) seal that appears on award plaques

In the United States, the Recording Industry Association of America (RIAA) operates an awards program based on the certified number of albums and singles sold through retail and other ancillary markets. Other countries have similar awards (see music recording certification). Certification is not automatic; for an award to be made, the record label must first request certification. The audit is conducted against net shipments after returns (most often an artist's royalty statement is used), which includes albums sold directly to retailers and one-stops, direct-to-consumer sales (music clubs and mail order) and other outlets.

== Audit of RIAA certifications ==
The association is popularly known for its traditional gold and platinum certification of albums and songs in the United States and also participates in collective recording rights management. The private company Gelfand, Rennert & Feldman (GR&F) is responsible for auditing RIAA sales. According to the Recording Industry Association of America's official website, "All certification audits are conducted, for a fee, by Gelfand, Rennert and Feldman, LLP (GR&F) for the RIAA. If multiple certification levels are certified simultaneously, only an audit certification fee will be charged." The RIAA website also mentions privately held Rennert and Feldman, LLP (GR&F) as RIAA auditors in all certification correspondence.

== Description and qualifications ==
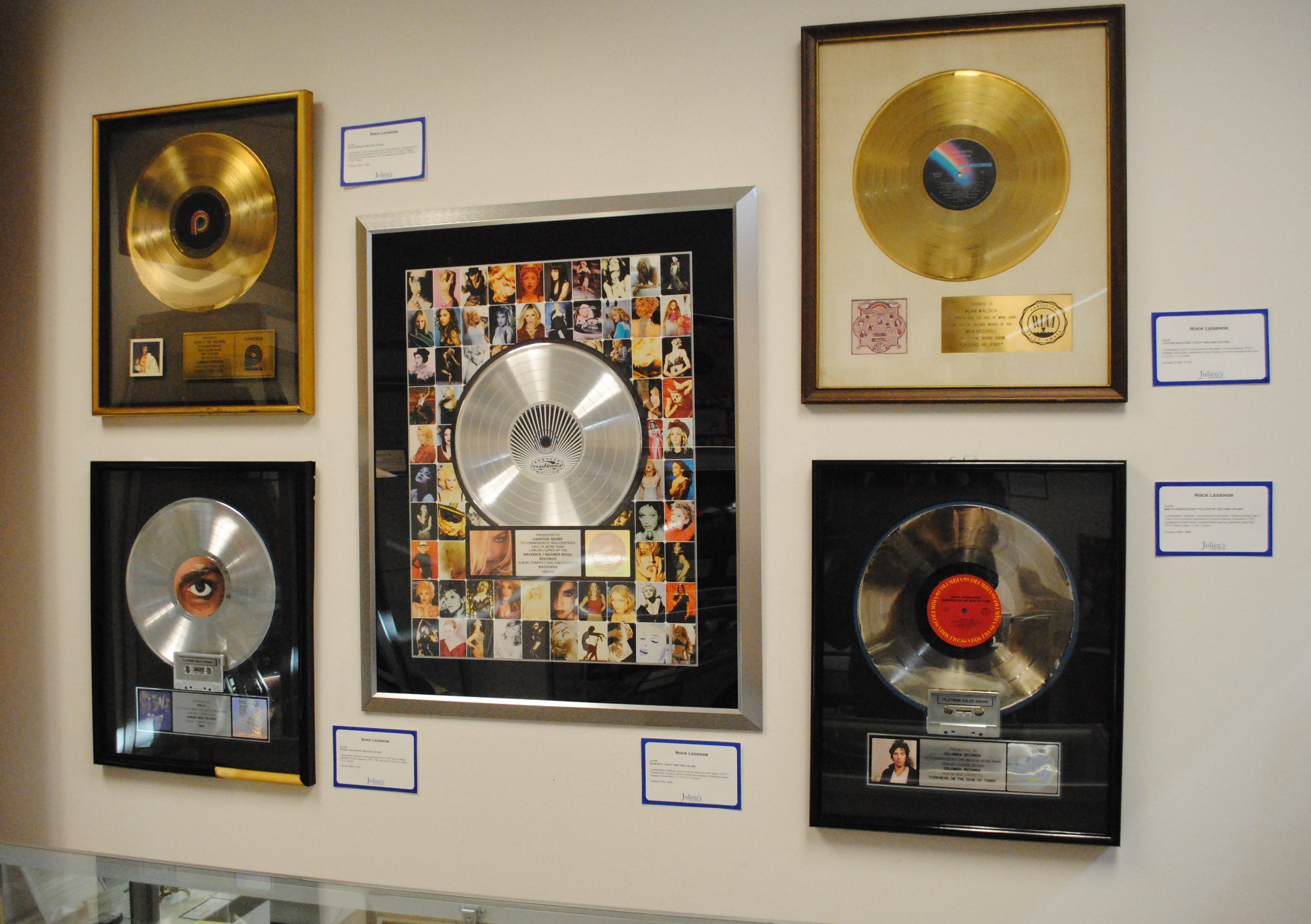
RIAA certifications for Prince, Bruce Springsteen, Michael Jackson, Madonna and Lynyrd Skynyrd on display at Julien's Auctions

A Gold record is a song or album that sells 500,000 units (records, tapes, and compact discs). The award was launched in 1958; originally, the requirement for a Gold single was one million units sold and a Gold album represented $1 million in sales (at wholesale value, around a third of the list price). In 1975, the additional requirement of 500,000 units sold was added for Gold albums. Reflecting growth in record sales, the Platinum award was added in 1976, for albums that sold one million units and for singles selling two million units. The Multi-Platinum award was introduced in 1984, signifying multiple Platinum levels of albums and singles. In 1989, the sales thresholds for singles were reduced to 500,000 for Gold and 1,000,000 for Platinum, reflecting a decrease in sales of singles. In 1992, RIAA began counting each disc in a multi-disc set as one unit toward certification. Reflecting additional growth in music sales, the Diamond award was instituted in 1999 for albums or singles selling ten million units. Because of these changes in criteria, the sales level associated with a particular award depends on when the award was made.

Nielsen SoundScan figures are not used in RIAA certification; the RIAA system predates Nielsen SoundScan and includes sales outlets Nielsen misses. Prior to Nielsen SoundScan, RIAA certification was the only audited and verifiable system for tracking music sales in the U.S.; it is still the only system capable of tracking 100% of sales (albeit as shipments less returns, not actual sales like Nielsen SoundScan). This system has permitted, at times, record labels to promote an album as Gold or Platinum simply based on large shipments. For instance, in 1978 the Sgt. Pepper's Lonely Hearts Club Band soundtrack shipped Platinum but was a sales bust, with two million returns. Similarly, all four solo albums by the members of Kiss simultaneously shipped Platinum that same year but did not reach the top 20 of the Billboard 200 album chart. The following year, the RIAA began requiring 120 days from the release date before recordings were eligible for certification, although that requirement has been reduced over the years and currently stands at 30 days. Upon criticism on why the RIAA won't adopt SoundScan as its source, Hilary Rosen, president of the recording association, defended their system: "We think the certification process represents an accurate sales picture and we’re comfortable with the numbers we release."

In the digital era, changes in the way music is consumed resulted in changes in the certification criteria. Actual album sales had dropped significantly, while digital download followed by streaming became increasingly dominant. On-demand audio and video streams started to be counted towards Digital Single units consumed in 2013. Track downloads and audio and video streams were then included in album certification in 2016 using formulas converting downloads and streams into the album units for certification purpose.

== List of certifications ==
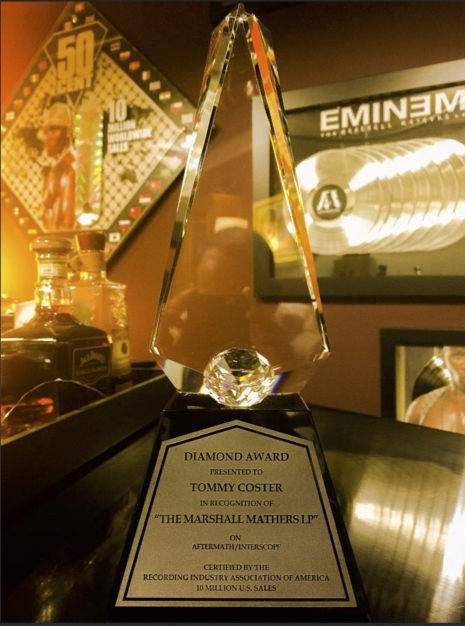
The "Diamond Award" granted by the Recording Industry Association of America (RIAA) recognizes 10 million units sold in the United States for both albums and singles.

=== Records ===
- 500,000 units: Gold album
- 1,000,000 units: Platinum album
- 2,000,000+ (in increments of 1,000,000 thereafter) units: Multi-Platinum album
- 10,000,000 units: Diamond album

Starting from February 1, 2016, each album unit may be one of the following:

1. Each permanent digital album or physical album sale;
2. 10 tracks from the album downloaded;
3. 1,500 on-demand audio or video streams of songs from the album.

==== Multi-disc ====
A multi-disc set is defined as a package containing two or more CDs, or their equivalent in tape or album format. To qualify for certification, the set must comply with minimum running time requirements: a two-disc product requires a minimum duration of 90 minutes, while a three-disc or more product requires a minimum duration of 100 minutes. If the requirements are met, each individual package or unit within the set counts as one unit toward the overall certification total.

For example, the Smashing Pumpkins' Mellon Collie and the Infinite Sadness (running time of 121:39) and OutKast's Speakerboxxx/The Love Below (running time of 134:56), both double albums, were counted twice, meaning each album was certified diamond after 5 million copies were shipped. Multi-disc albums from the vinyl era are also eligible for certification. Pink Floyd's The Wall and the Beatles' White Album, both vinyl-era, are also counted as double even though their running times are under the minimum requirement.

==== Latin ====
Since 2000, the RIAA also awards Los Premios de Oro y de Platino (Gold and Platinum Awards in Spanish) to Latin albums, which are defined by the RIAA as a type of product that features at least 51% of content in Spanish.

List of certifications, showing name and units required
Certification	Units required (as of December 20, 2013)	Units required (before December 20, 2013)
Disco de Oro	30,000	50,000
Disco de Platino	60,000	100,000
Disco de Multi-Platino	120,000	200,000
Disco de Diamante	600,000	1,000,000

Note: The number of sales required to qualify for Oro and Platino awards was higher prior to January 1, 2008. The thresholds were 100,000 units (Oro) and 200,000 units (Platino). All Spanish-language albums certified prior to 2008 were updated to match the current certification at the time. "La Bomba" by Bolivian group Azul Azul is the only single to receive a Latin certification based on shipments before the creation of the Latin digital singles awards in 2013. The Disco de Diamante award was introduced after the RIAA updated the thresholds for Latin certifications on December 20, 2013. The Disco de Diamante is awarded to Latin albums that have been certified 10× Platinum.

=== Singles ===
Standard singles are certified:

- Gold when it ships 500,000 copies
- Platinum when it ships 1,000,000 copies
- Multi-Platinum when it ships at least 2,000,000 copies

Note: The number of sales required to qualify for Gold and Platinum discs was higher prior to January 1, 1989. The thresholds were previously 1,000,000 units (Gold) and 2,000,000 units (Platinum).

Digital singles are certified:

- Gold means 500,000 certification units
- Platinum means 1,000,000 certification units
- Multi-Platinum means 2,000,000+ certification units

From 2004 through July 2006, the certification level was 100,000 downloads for Gold and 200,000 for Platinum. When the RIAA changed the certification standards to match retail distribution in August 2006, all Platinum and Multi-Platinum awards for a digital release were withdrawn. Gold certifications, however, were not, meaning a song that was downloaded over 100,000 times and certified so by the RIAA during that time frame retains its Gold status.

Starting May 9, 2013, RIAA certifications for singles in the "digital" category include on-demand audio and/or video song streams in addition to downloads at a rate of 100 streams = 1 certification "unit". On February 1, 2016, this rate was updated to 150 streams = 1 certification unit.

Latin digital singles are certified:

- Disco de Oro (Gold) means 30,000 certification units
- Disco de Platino (Platinum) means 60,000 certification units
- Disco de Multi-Platino (Multi-Platinum) means 120,000+ certification units

The Latin Digital Single Awards began on December 20, 2013. As with the digital sales, 100 streams count as one download sale.

=== Video Longform ===
Along with albums, digital albums, and singles there is another classification of music release called "Video Longform." This release format includes DVD and VHS releases, and certain live albums and compilation albums. The certification criteria are slightly different from other styles.

- Gold: 50,000 copies
- Platinum: 100,000 copies
- Multi-Platinum: 200,000 copies

=== Video Single ===
For Video Single certification, the title must contain no more than two songs and must have a running time of no more than 15 minutes. The certification criteria are:

- Gold: 25,000 copies
- Platinum: 50,000 copies
- Multi-Platinum: 100,000 copies

As of 2021, the titles certified the most Video Single awards are "Here Without You" by 3 Doors Down and Elvis Presley's "A Little Less Conversation", both winning 6× Platinum for 300,000 copies. Since 2010, only 5 titles have been certified Video Single. The latest Gold was awarded to "R40" by Rush in 2017.

=== Video Box Set ===
The Video Box Set (or Multi-Box Music Video Set) award is a classification for video compilations that include three or more videos that are grouped and marketed together as a set. Like Video Longform, this includes DVD and VHS releases and the certification criteria are the same. Each individual video within set is counted as one toward certification.

- Gold: 50,000 copies
- Platinum: 100,000 copies
- Multi-Platinum: 200,000 copies

The best-selling video box set as certified by the RIAA is the Rolling Stones' Four Flicks DVD compilation from their Licks World Tour, with a 19× Multi-Platinum designation. This was likely achieved due to exclusive distribution rights owned by retailer Best Buy by their short-lived music production company, Redline Entertainment.

=== Master Ringtone ===
Master Ringtone (mastertone) awards were introduced in 2006. Certification levels are identical to those of singles, 500,000 for Gold and 1,000,000 for Platinum and 2,000,000+ Multi-Platinum.

Many Master Ringtone certifications were awarded until 2009, but since then only ten certifications were awarded in 2010, three in 2012 and three in 2019, all three to AC/DC.

== Records ==
Lists from RIAA site showing current status holders of RIAA Certifications:

- List of highest-certified music artists in the United States
- List of best-selling albums in the United States
- List of best-selling singles in the United States
- List of best-selling Latin albums in the United States

== Artists with the most album certifications ==
=== Most Platinum ===
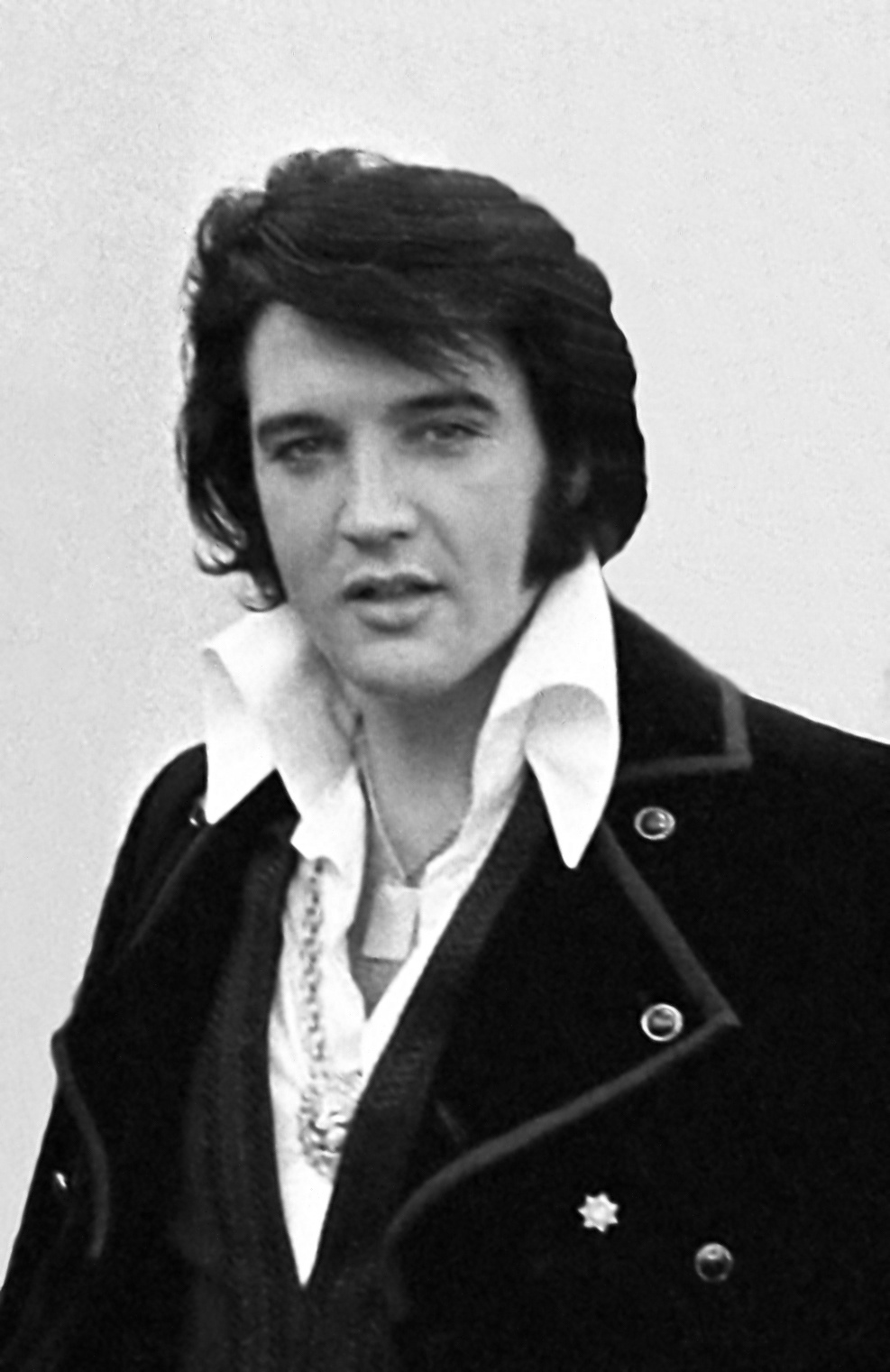
Elvis Presley is the male artist with the most platinum albums.

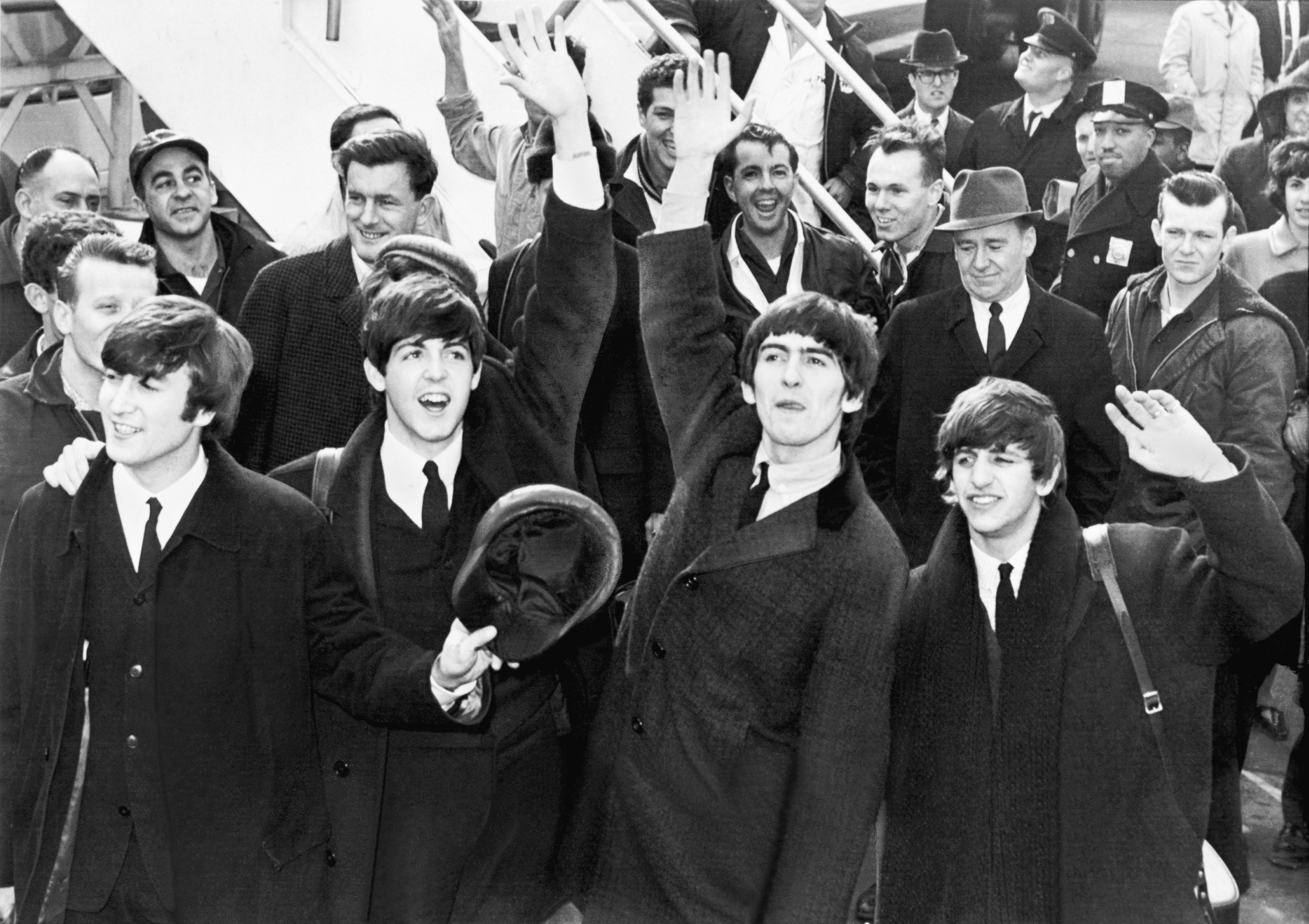
The Beatles are the band with the most platinum and diamond albums.

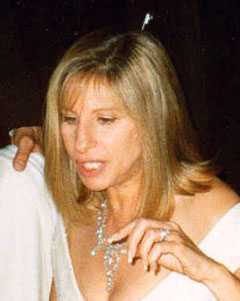
Barbra Streisand and Madonna are the female artists with the most platinum albums.

This list show the artists with at least 10 platinum albums (excluding compilations).

Artist	#
Elvis Presley	30
George Strait	24
The Beatles	19
The Rolling Stones	18
Barbra Streisand	17
Madonna	17
Elton John	16
Taylor Swift	16
Reba McEntire	15
Alabama	15
Luther Vandross	15
AC/DC	14
Rush	14
Drake	14
Kenny Rogers	14
Kiss
Rod Stewart	13
Jay Z	13
Bruce Springsteen	13
Chicago	13
U2	12
Alan Jackson	12
Prince	12
Mariah Carey	12
Eminem	12
Garth Brooks	11
Aerosmith	11
Bob Dylan	11
Billy Joel	11
James Taylor	11
Willie Nelson	11
Linda Ronstadt	11
Kenny Chesney	11
Neil Diamond	10
Celine Dion	10
John Mellencamp	10
Metallica	10
Van Halen	10

=== Most Diamond ===
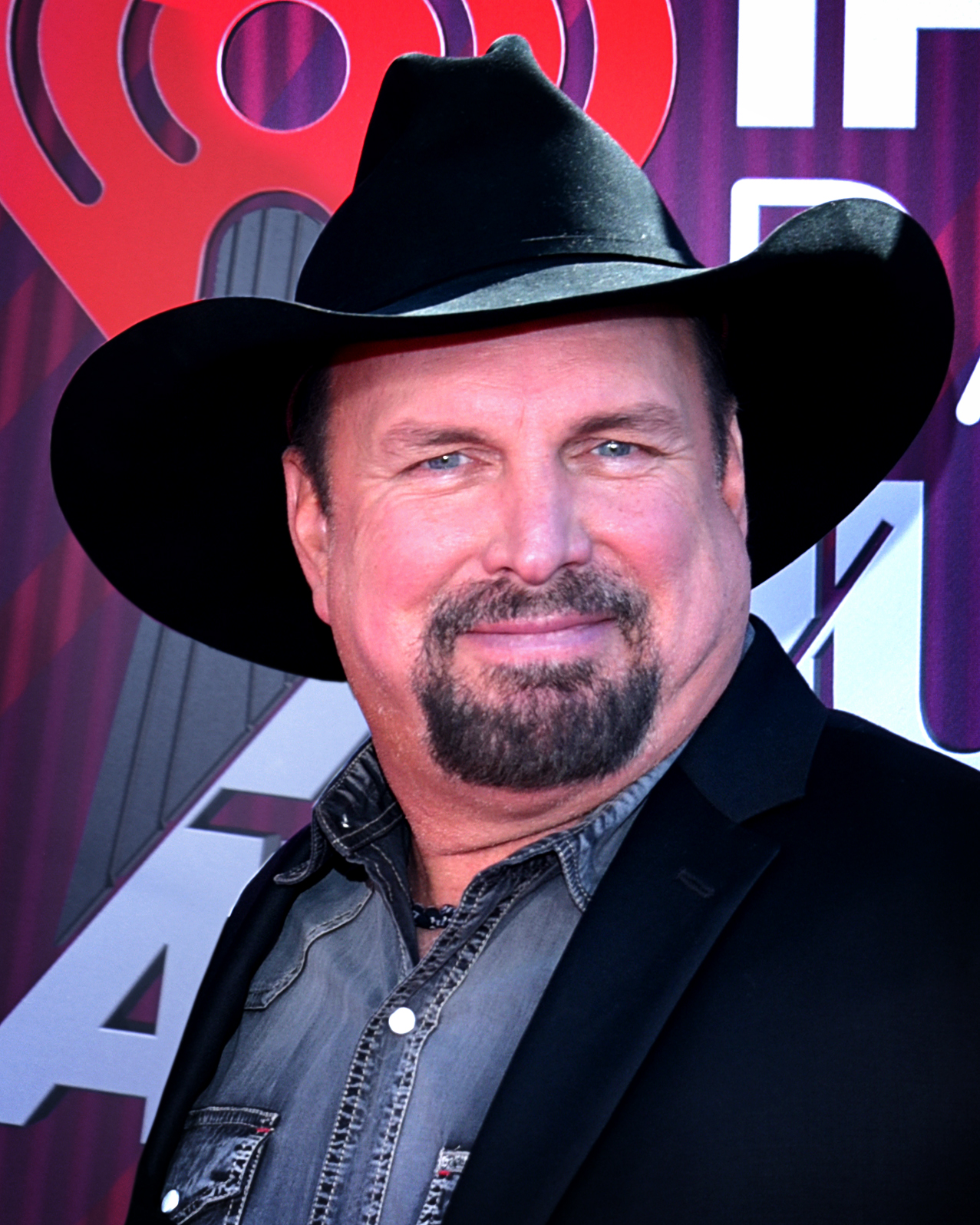
Garth Brooks is the male artist with the most diamond albums.

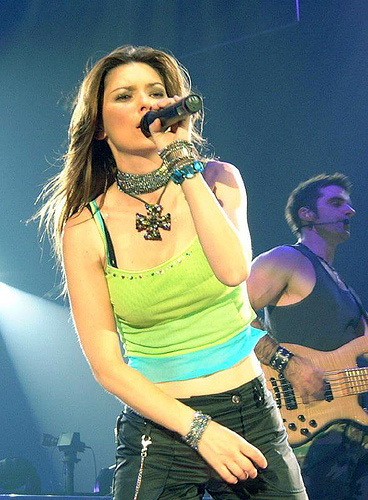
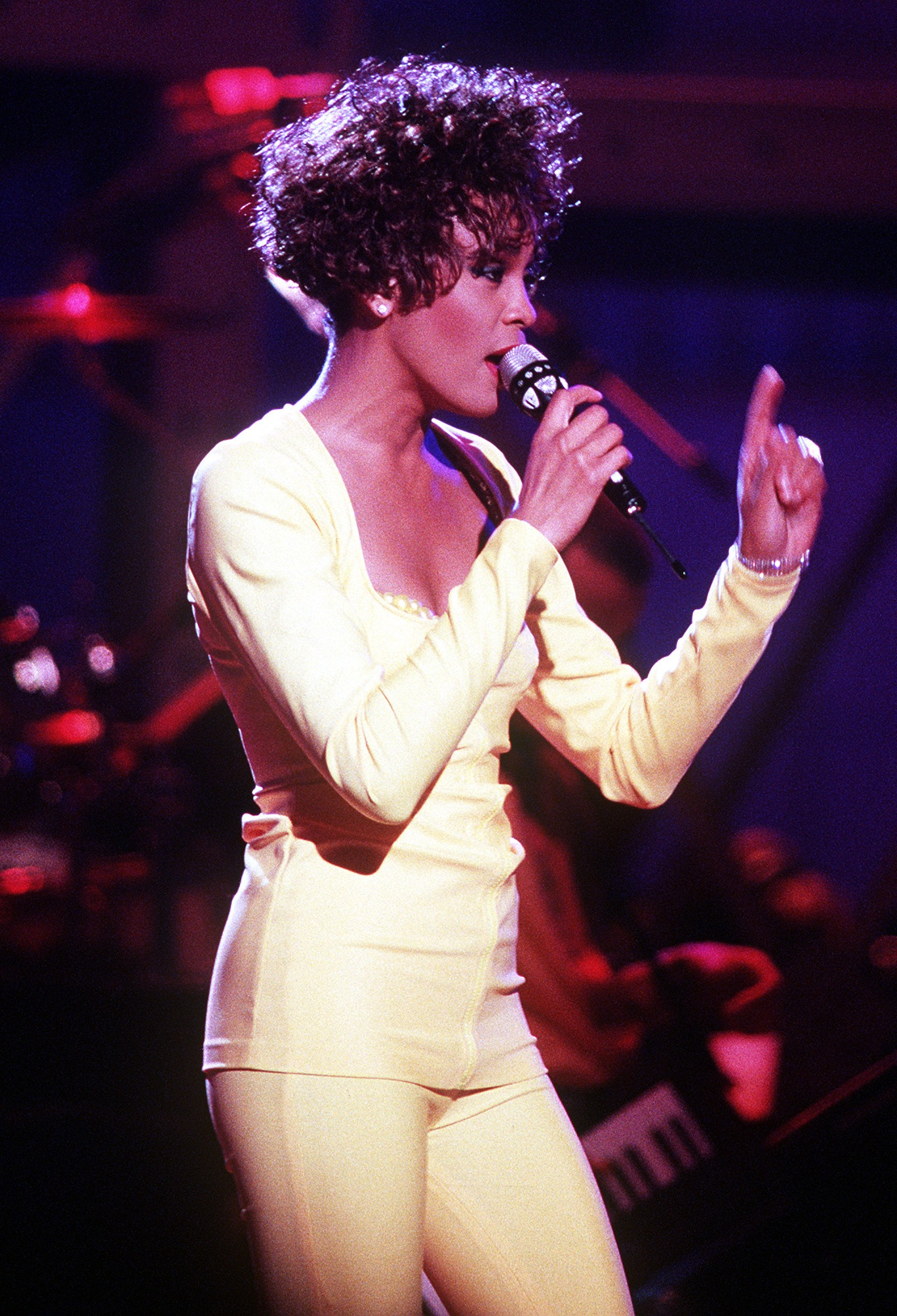
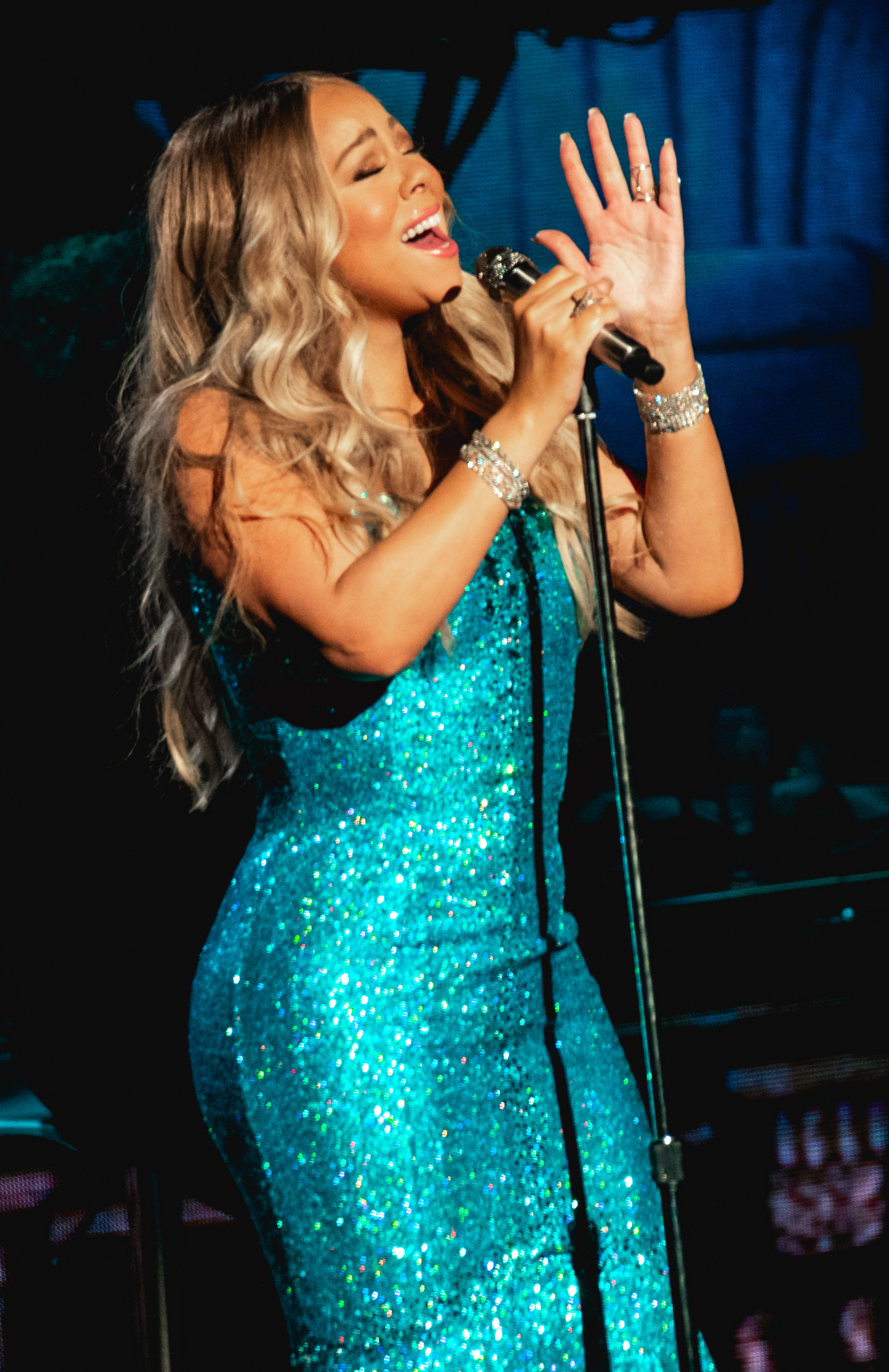
Shania Twain, Whitney Houston, and Mariah Carey are the female artists with the most diamond albums.

This table tracks artists with at least two Diamond certified albums.

Artist	#
Garth Brooks	9
The Beatles	6
Led Zeppelin	5
Shania Twain	3
Whitney Houston	3
Eagles	3
Michael Jackson	3
Eminem	3
2Pac	3
Mariah Carey	3
Adele	2
Backstreet Boys	2
Billy Joel	2
Britney Spears	2
Bruce Springsteen	2
Celine Dion	2
Def Leppard	2
Journey	2
Madonna	2
NSYNC	2
Pink Floyd	2
Taylor Swift	2
The Chicks	2
Van Halen	2
Drake	2
Linkin Park	2

== Artists with the most single certifications ==
=== Most Platinum ===
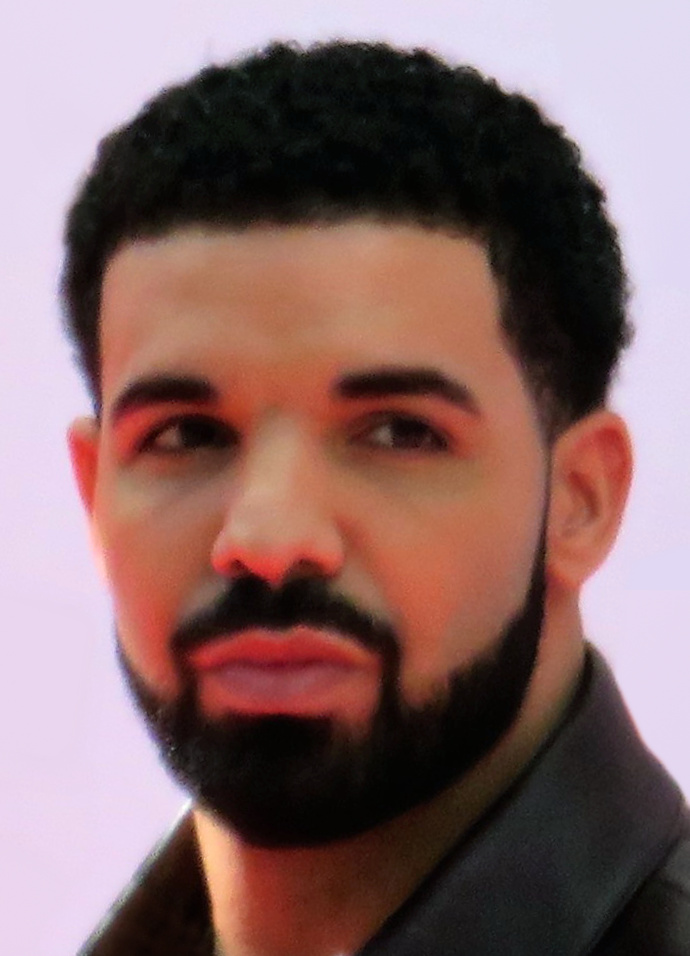
Drake is the male artist with the most platinum singles.

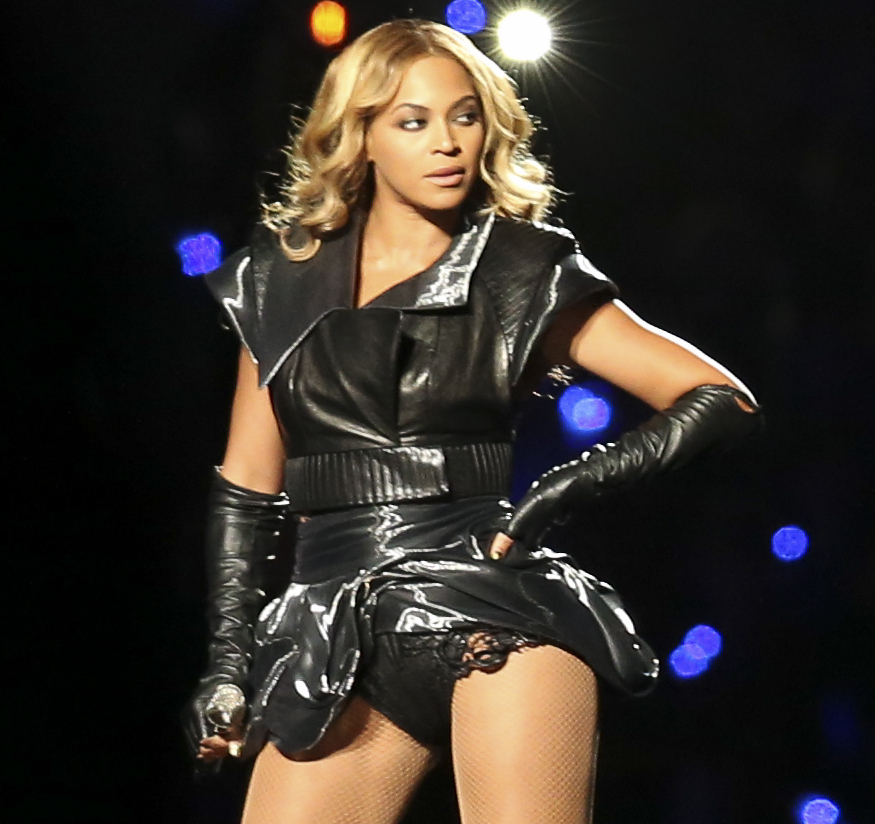
Beyoncé is the female artist with the most platinum singles.

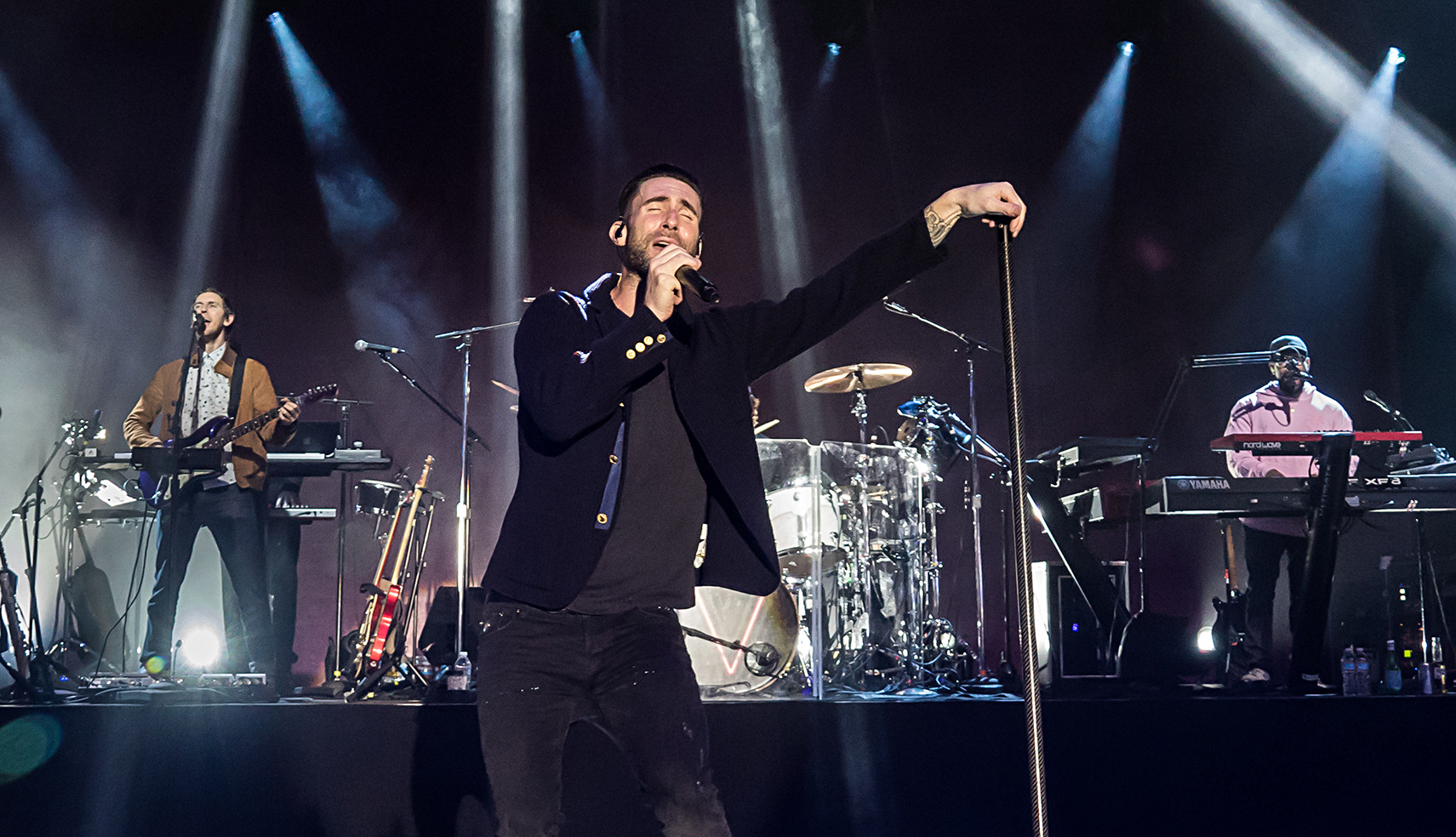
Maroon 5 is the band with the most platinum singles.

This table tracks artists with some number of singles that have received at least 20 digital platinum certifications (excluding features).

Artist	#
30 or more
Drake	80
Kanye West	56
Travis Scott	55
Beyoncé	53
Taylor Swift	50
Future	50
Post Malone	47
The Weeknd	47
Chris Brown	47
Ariana Grande	47
Rihanna	46
Juice WRLD	43
Eminem	41
Justin Bieber	41
Morgan Wallen	40
J. Cole	37
Lil Wayne	36
Lil Baby	33
YoungBoy Never Broke Again	32
Rod Wave	31
22–29
Luke Bryan	28
Elvis Presley	27
Blake Shelton	26
Usher	26
Maroon 5	25
Carrie Underwood	25
Mariah Carey	25
Kendrick Lamar	25
Katy Perry	24
Twenty One Pilots	24
SZA	23
Britney Spears	23
Cardi B	23
Nicki Minaj	22
Ed Sheeran	22
Whitney Houston	22
Tim McGraw	22
Lil Durk	22
20–21
Billie Eilish	21
Imagine Dragons	21
Michael Jackson	21
XXXTentacion	21
Eric Church	21
Doja Cat	21
Panic! at the Disco	21
A Boogie wit da Hoodie	21
Trippie Redd
Lady Gaga	20
Jason Aldean	20
Lil Uzi Vert	20
Ludacris	20
Lana Del Rey	20
Bruno Mars	20

=== Most Diamond ===
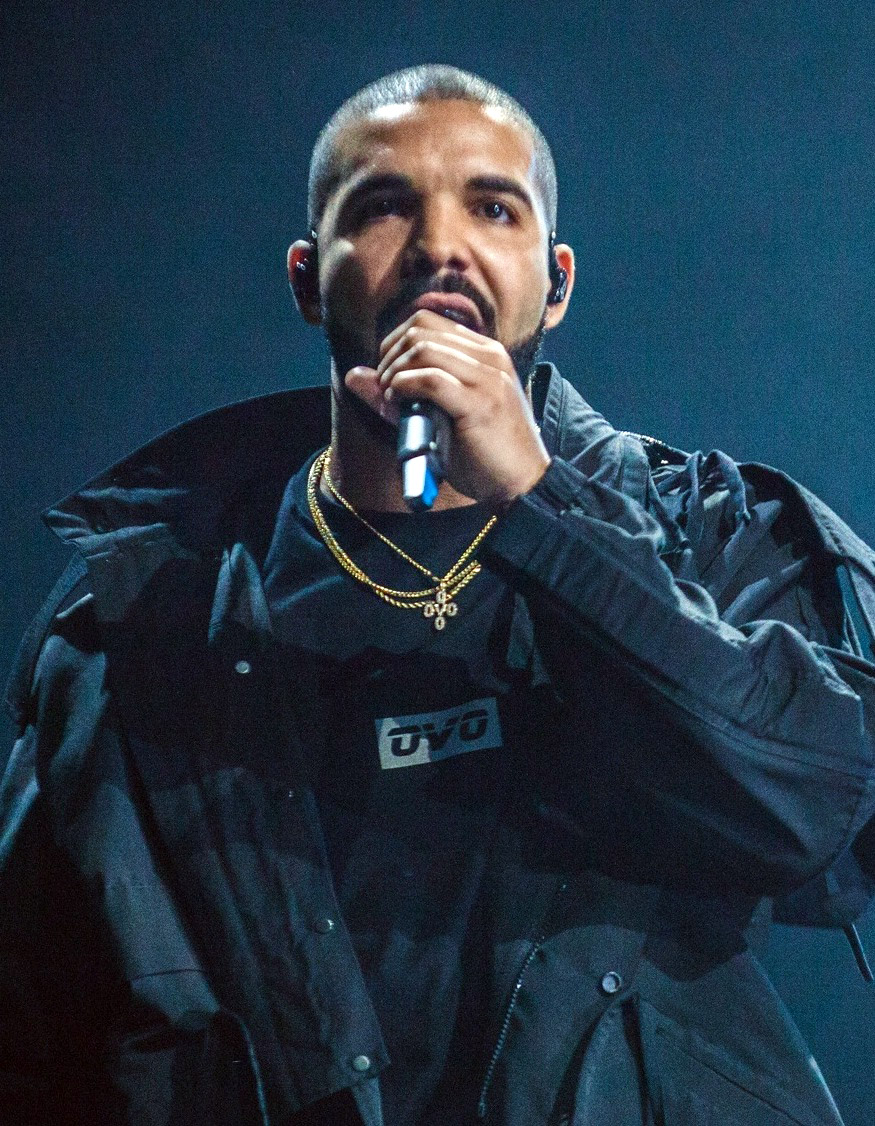
Drake is the male artist with the most diamond singles.

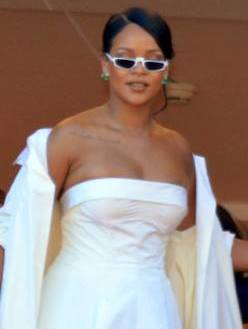
Rihanna is the female artist with the most diamond singles.

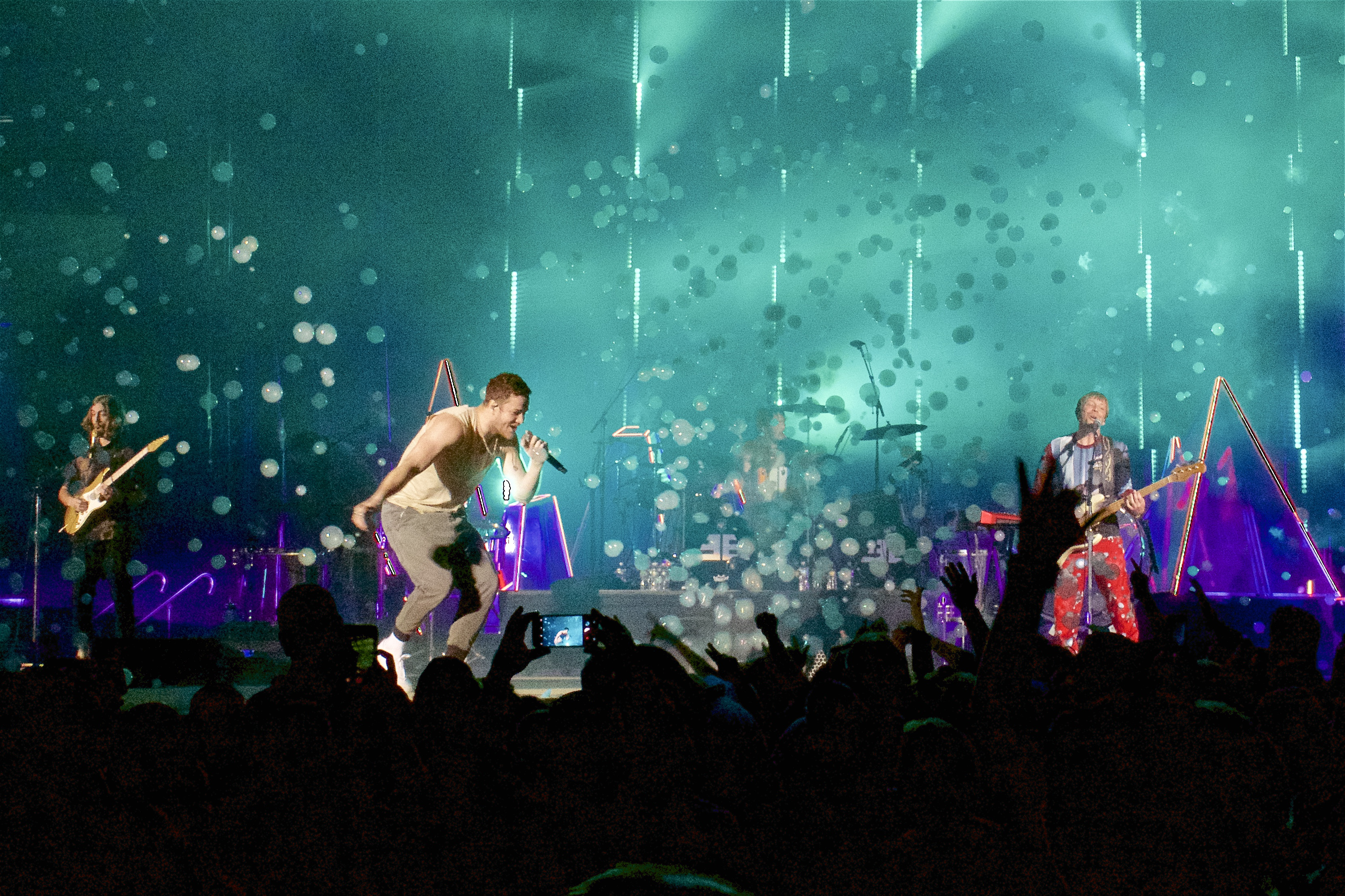
Imagine Dragons is the band with the most diamond singles.

This table tracks artists with some number of singles that have received at least 2 Diamond certifications.

Artist	#
Drake	19
Post Malone	10
The Weeknd	9
Rihanna	8
Bruno Mars	8
Katy Perry	6
Lil Wayne	6
Morgan Wallen	6
Justin Bieber	5
Kanye West	5
Future	5
Imagine Dragons	4
Cardi B	4
Eminem	4
Luke Combs	4
The Chainsmokers	3
Ed Sheeran	3
Jay-Z	3
Maroon 5	3
Lady Gaga	3
Khalid	3
Wiz Khalifa	3
Halsey	3
Nicki Minaj	3
Twenty One Pilots	3
SZA	3
Swae Lee	3
Ludacris	2
J. Cole	2
Travis Scott	2
Florida Georgia Line	2
Michael Jackson	2
Macklemore & Ryan Lewis	2
XXXTENTACION	2
Pitbull	2
Zach Bryan	2
Pharrell Williams	2
Billie Eilish	2
Alicia Keys	2
Kid Cudi	2
Beyoncé	2
Kesha	2
Ariana Grande	2
Chris Brown	2
Sia	2
The Black Eyed Peas	2
Panic! at the Disco	2
Ty Dolla Sign	2
Bryson Tiller	2
Quavo	2
Lil Yachty	2
Jason Aldean	2
Luke Bryan	2
Chris Stapleton	2
Fall Out Boy	2
Christina Aguilera	2

- Drake currently has 18 Diamond Certified singles, but 19 Diamond Certifications by "God’s Plan", which is double-Diamond Certified.
- Post Malone currently has 9 Diamond Certified singles, but 10 Diamond Certifications by "Sunflower", first double-Diamond Certified single with 20 million units sold.
- Bruno Mars currently has 7 Diamond Certified singles, but 8 Diamond Certifications by "Just The Way You Are", which is double-Diamond Certified and the highest certified single in history with 21 million units sold.
- Swae Lee currently has 3 Diamond Certified singles, but 4 Diamond Certifications by "Sunflower", which is double-Diamond Certified.
- Chris Stapleton currently has 1 Diamond Certified single, but 2 Diamond Certifications by "Tennessee Whiskey", which is double-Diamond Certified.

== RIAA Diamond certifications ==
See also: a comprehensive list of certified works with Diamond status at RIAA's website.

=== Albums ===
Highest certified Diamond albums
Year of release	Artist(s)	Title	Certification	Year of certification
1976	Eagles	Their Greatest Hits (1971–1975)	40× Platinum	2026
1982	Michael Jackson	Thriller	34× Platinum	2021
1980	AC/DC	Back in Black	27× Platinum	2024
1976	Eagles	Hotel California	26× Platinum	2018
1971	Led Zeppelin	Led Zeppelin IV	24× Platinum	2021
1968	The Beatles	The Beatles	24× Platinum	2019
1985	Billy Joel	Greatest Hits – Volume I & Volume II	23× Platinum	2011
1998	Garth Brooks	Double Live	23× Platinum	2023
1979	Pink Floyd	The Wall	23× Platinum	1999
1994	Hootie & the Blowfish	Cracked Rear View	22× Platinum	2024
1977	Fleetwood Mac	Rumours	21× Platinum	2023
1997	Shania Twain	Come On Over	20× Platinum	2004
1994	Green Day	Dookie	20× Platinum	2024

=== Singles ===
Highest certified Diamond singles (digital)
Year of release	Artist(s)	Title	Certification	Year of certification
2010	Bruno Mars	"Just the Way You Are"	21x Platinum	2025
2018	Post Malone & Swae Lee	"Sunflower (Spider-Man: Into the Spider-Verse)"	20× Platinum	2024
2015	Chris Stapleton	"Tennessee Whiskey"	20× Platinum	2026
1981	Journey	"Don't Stop Believin'"	18× Platinum	2024
2014	Ed Sheeran	"Thinking Out Loud"	18× Platinum	2024
2013	OneRepublic	"Counting Stars"	18× Platinum	2026
1994	Mariah Carey	"All I Want for Christmas Is You"	18× Platinum	2025
2016	The Chainsmokers	"Closer" (featuring Halsey)	18× Platinum	2026
2019	Lil Nas X	"Old Town Road" (featuring Billy Ray Cyrus)	17× Platinum	2022
2016	Travis Scott	"Goosebumps" (featuring Kendrick Lamar)	17× Platinum	2025
2012	Imagine Dragons	"Radioactive"	17× Platinum	2024
2012	Gotye featuring Kimbra	"Somebody That I Used to Know"	17× Platinum	2026

Highest certified singles (physical)
Year of release	Artist(s)	Title	Certification	Year of certification
1997	Elton John	"Something About the Way You Look Tonight" / "Candle in the Wind 1997"	11× Platinum	1997
1956	Elvis Presley	"Hound Dog" / "Don't Be Cruel"	4× Platinum	1999
1992	Whitney Houston	"I Will Always Love You"	4× Platinum	1992
1985	USA for Africa	"We Are the World"	4× Platinum	1985
1992	Los del Río	"Macarena"	4× Platinum	1996
1968	The Beatles	"Hey Jude"	4× Platinum	1999
1993	Tag Team	"Whoomp! (There It Is)"	4× Platinum	1999
1991	Bryan Adams	"(Everything I Do) I Do It for You"	3× Platinum	1991

== RIAA Diamante Latin certifications ==
These lists are based on the latest data featured on the list of certified works with Latin Diamond or 10× Platinum status (at least 600,000 certified units) at RIAA's website. RIAA does not automatically issue certifications, even if sales and streaming numbers meet the criteria. Artists have to apply and pay RIAA to have their works certified and recertified. As such, these lists do not include all certifiable Latin works and certified works are not routinely updated.

=== Albums (Latin) ===
Highest certified Latin albums
Year of release	Artist(s)	Title	Certification	Standard certification	Year of certification
1995	Selena	Dreaming of You	62× Platinum; 6× Diamond	3× Platinum	2017
1994	Selena	Amor Prohibido	41× Platinum; 4× Diamond	2× Platinum	2017
2014	Romeo Santos	Formula, Vol. 2	31× Platinum; 3× Diamond	N/A	2024
2023	Karol G	Mañana Será Bonito	28× Platinum; 2× Diamond	N/A	2024
2017	Ozuna	Odisea	28× Platinum; 2× Diamond	N/A	2022
2018	Elvis Crespo	Suavemente	26× Platinum; 2× Diamond	N/A	2024
2020	Bad Bunny	YHLQMDLG	24× Platinum; 2× Diamond	N/A	2021
2018	Ozuna	Aura	23× Platinum; 2× Diamond	N/A	2022
2019	Luis Fonsi	Vida	22× Platinum; 2× Diamond	N/A	2019
2023	Fuerza Regida	Pa Las Baby’s y Belikeadas	20× Platinum; 2× Diamond	N/A	2024
2019	J Balvin & Bad Bunny	Oasis	20× Platinum; 2× Diamond	N/A	2025
2004	Juanes	Mi Sangre	20× Platinum; 2× Diamond	N/A	2024
2002	Juanes	Un Día Normal	18× Platinum; 1× Diamond	N/A	2022
2002	Selena	Ones	18× Platinum; 1× Diamond	Gold	2017
2018	J Balvin	Vibras	17× Platinum; 1× Diamond	N/A	2025
2021	Rauw Alejandro	Vice Versa	17× Platinum; 1× Diamond	N/A	2024
1993	Gloria Estefan	Mi Tierra	16× Platinum; 1× Diamond	Platinum	2000
2023	Junior H	$ad Boyz 4 Life II	16× Platinum; 1× Diamond	N/A	2025
2006	Maná	Amar es Combatir	16× Platinum; 1× Diamond	Gold	2023
2011	Romeo Santos	Formula, Vol. 1	15× Platinum; 1× Diamond	N/A	2022

=== Singles (Latin) ===
Highest certified Latin singles
Year of release	Artist(s)	Title	Latin certification	Year of certification
2017	Luis Fonsi & Daddy Yankee	"Despacito"	141× Platinum; 14× Diamond	2024
2018	Nio García, Casper Mágico, Bad Bunny, Ozuna, Darell & Nicky Jam	"Te Boté (Remix)"	106× Platinum; 10× Diamond	2025
2019	Jhayco, Bad Bunny, J Balvin	"No Me Conoce" (Remix)	90× Platimum; 9× Diamond	2024
2017	J Balvin & Willy William	"Mi Gente" (Featuring Beyoncé)	68× Platimum; 6× Diamond	2018
2013	Romeo Santos	"Propuesta Indecente"	65× Platinum; 6× Diamond	2024
2018	Raymix	"Oye Mujer"	53× Platinum; 5× Diamond	2025
2021	Farruko	"Pepas"	52× Platinum; 5× Diamond	2023
2018	Bad Bunny	"Mía" featuring Drake	50× Platinum; 5× Diamond	2021
2024	Floymenor	"Gata Only" featuring Cris MJ	50× Platinum; 5× Diamond	2025
2013	Prince Royce	"Corazón Sin Cara"	50× Platinum; 5× Diamond	2025
2018	Anuel AA & Haze	"Amanece"	47× Platinum; 4× Diamond	2025
2017	Becky G & Bad Bunny	"Mayores"	46× Platinum; 4× Diamond	2021
2018	DJ Luian, Mambo Kingz, Ozuna, Bad Bunny, Wisin & Almighty	"Solita"	44× Platinum; 4× Diamond	2024
2017	Maluma	"Felices los 4"	44× Platinum; 4× Diamond	2021
2018	Daddy Yankee	"Dura"	43× Platinum; 4× Diamond	2020
2016	Shakira & Carlos Vives	"La Bicicleta"	43× Platinum; 4× Diamond	2025
2023	Junior H & Peso Pluma	"El Azul"	42× Platinum; 4× Diamond	2025
2019	Sech & Darell	"Otro Trago"	42× Platinum; 4× Diamond	2023
2019	Daddy Yankee	"Con Calma" (Featuring Snow)	41× Platinum; 4× Diamond	2020
2019	Karol G & Nicki Minaj	"Tusa"	41× Platinum; 4× Diamond	2021
2020	Maluma	"Hawái"	40× Platinum; 4× Diamond	
2014	Romeo Santos	"Eres Mía"	39× Platinum; 3× Diamond	2022
2018	Becky G & Natti Natasha	"Sin Pijama"	38× Platinum; 3× Diamond	2021
2023	Fuerza Regida	"TQM"	36× Platinum; 3× Diamond	2024
2023	Fuerza Regida	"Sabor Fresa"	36× Platinum; 3× Diamond	2024
2022	Karol G	"Provenza"	36× Platinum; 3× Diamond	2023
2018	Nicky Jam & J Balvin	"X"	35× Platinum; 3× Diamond	2019
2024	Chino Pacas	"El Gordo Trae El Mando"	34× Platinum; 3× Diamond	
2011	Romeo Santos	"Promise" (Featuring Usher)	34× Platinum; 3× Diamond	2025
2014	Romeo Santos	"Odio" (Featuring Drake)	34× Platinum; 3× Diamond	2025
2004	Daddy Yankee	"Gasolina"	33× Platinum; 3× Diamond	2024
2005	Shakira	"La Tortura"	32× Platinum; 3× Diamond	2018

== See also ==
- List of best-selling albums
- List of best-selling music artists
- List of best-selling singles
