= Bebe Dame =

2022 single by Fuerza Regida and Grupo Frontera

Single by Fuerza Regida and Grupo Frontera

from the album Sigan Hablando
- Language: Spanish
- Released: December 16, 2022
- Genre: Mexican cumbia
- Length: 4:31
- Label: Rancho Humilde; Street Mob; BorderKid; Sony Music Latin
- Songwriters: Edgar Barrera; Miguel Armenta; Jesús Ortiz Paz
- Producers: Jimmy Humilde; Barrera; Armenta; JOP

Fuerza Regida singles chronology
| "CH y la Pizza" (2022) | "Bebe Dame" (2022) | "Vete Ya" (2023) |

Grupo Frontera singles chronology
| "Que Vuelvas" (2022) | "Bebe Dame" (2022) | "Di Que Sí" (2023) |

Music video
- "Bebe Dame" on YouTube

"Bebe Dame" is a song by the American regional Mexican bands Fuerza Regida and Grupo Frontera, released on December 16, 2022 as the third single from the former's seventh studio album Sigan Hablando (2022). The song was produced by Jimmy Humilde, Edgar Barrera, Miguel Armenta and JOP. It is Fuerza Regida's first song to reach the Billboard Hot 100 and highest-charting song to date, debuting at number 91 and peaking at number 25. It also peaked at number one on both the US Hot Latin Songs and Mexico Songs charts.

== Composition ==
"Bebe Dame" is a Mexican cumbia song which centers on a romantic relationship, with a man asking his partner to give him a second chance after causing her pain in some way.

== Charts ==
=== Weekly charts ===
Weekly chart performance for "Bebe Dame"
| Chart (2022–2023) | Peak position |
|---|---|
| Bolivia (Billboard) | 3 |
| Global 200 (Billboard) | 17 |
| Ecuador (Billboard) | 25 |
| Mexico (Billboard) | 1 |
| US Billboard Hot 100 | 25 |
| US Hot Latin Songs (Billboard) | 1 |
| US Latin Airplay (Billboard) | 1 |
| US Regional Mexican Airplay (Billboard) | 1 |

=== Year-end charts ===
Year-end chart performance for "Bebe Dame"
| Chart (2023) | Position |
|---|---|
| Global 200 (Billboard) | 102 |
| US Billboard Hot 100 | 73 |
| US Hot Latin Songs (Billboard) | 5 |

== Certifications ==
Certifications for "Bebe Dame"
| Region | Certification | Certified units/sales |
|---|---|---|
| Mexico (AMPROFON) | 2× Diamond+Gold | 1,470,000^{‡} |
^{‡} Sales+streaming figures based on certification alone.

== See also ==
- List of Billboard Hot Latin Songs and Latin Airplay number ones of 2023
