= List of awards and nominations received by Bad Bunny =

Bad Bunny awards and nominations
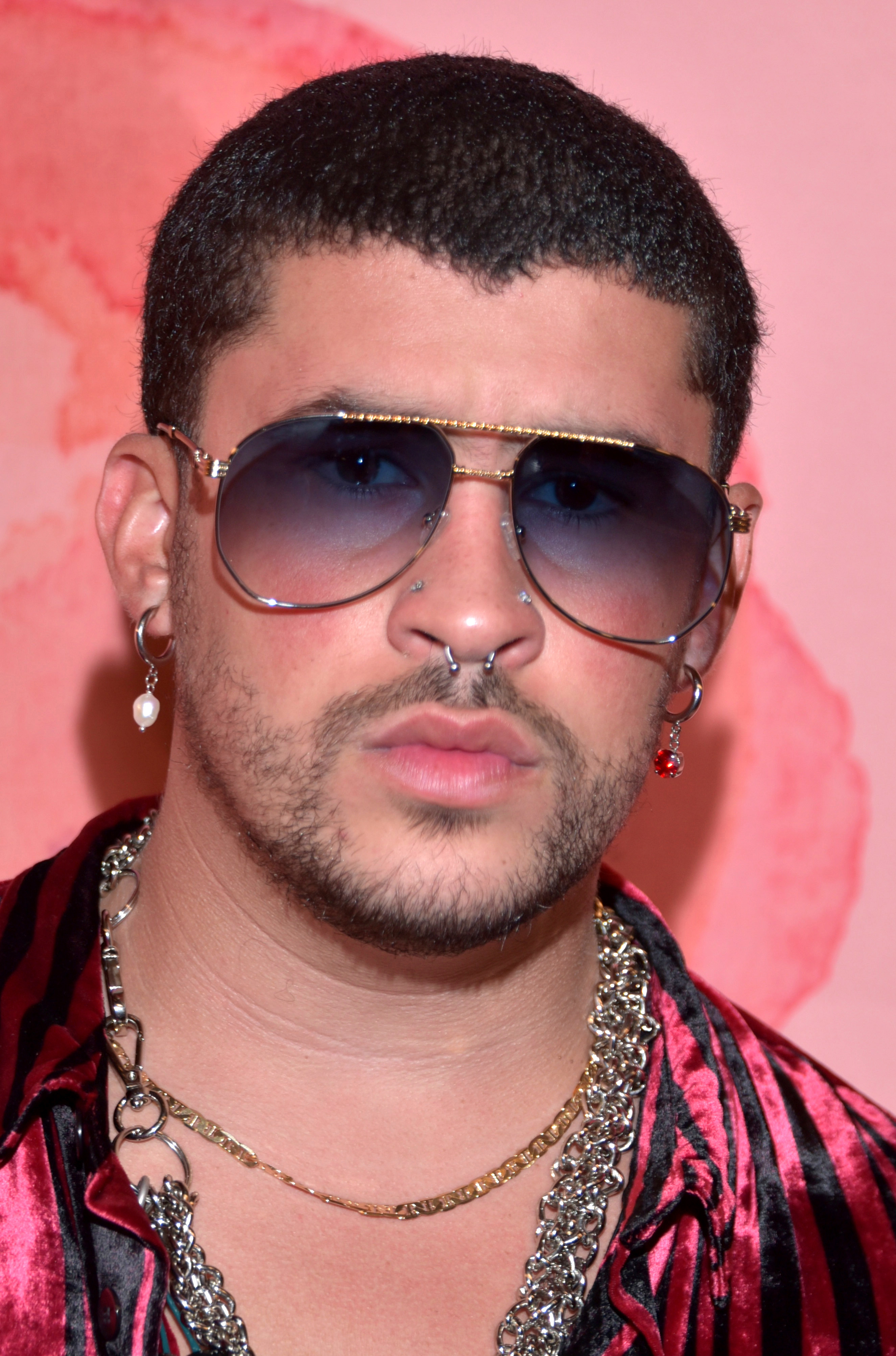
- Bad Bunny in 2019
Awards and nominations
Award	Wins	Nominations
Emmy Awards	1	1
Grammy Awards	6	16
Latin Grammy Awards	17	52
Billboard Music Awards	16	38
Billboard Latin Music Awards	61	134

Totals (Note: Certain award groups do not simply award one winner. They acknowledge several different recipients, have runners-up, and have third place. Since this is a specific recognition and is different from losing an award, runner-up mentions are considered wins in this award tally. For simplification and to avoid errors, each award in this list has been presumed to have had a prior nomination.)
- Wins: 374
- Nominations: 887

Puerto Rican singer-songwriter Bad Bunny has received numerous awards and nominations. His accolades include a Primetime Emmy, 6 Grammy Awards, 17 Latin Grammy Awards, 16 Billboard Music Awards, and 61 Billboard Latin Music Awards.

In 2016, Bad Bunny began his music career as an independent Latin Trap artist on Soundcloud, through which he released his first singles, including "Diles." Later in the same year, he signed with his current record label, Rimas Entrainment, releasing his single "Soy Peor." In 2017, his music primarily consisted of collaborations with fellow reggaeton artists, including J Balvin on "Si Tu Novio Te Deja Sola," Becky G on "Mayores," and Prince Royce and J Balvin on "Sensualidad." He earned his first Latin Grammy Awards nomination for "Si Tu Novio Te Deja Sola" at the 18th Awards, and his first Billboard Music Awards nomination for "Mayores" at the 25th Awards. He was also nominated for New Artist of the Year at the 25th Billboard Latin Music Awards, his first nomination for the Awards.

In 2018, Bad Bunny continued collaborating with various artists, including Enrique Iglesias on "El Baño," Drake on "Mía," Cardi B and J Balvin on "I Like It," and Nio García, Darell, Casper Mágico, Nicky Jam, and Ozuna on "Te Boté." He received his first Grammy Awards nomination at the 61st Awards and first Billboard win at the 26th Awards for "I Like It," and earned his first Latin Billboard wins at the 26th Awards for "Te Boté." Late in 2018, he also released his debut album X 100pre. Nominated for the Grammys, Latin Grammys, Billboards, and Latin Billboards, the album won Best Urban Music Album at the 20th Latin Grammys, his first win at the Awards. Also, nominated for both Grammys and Billboards, Oasis, his collaborative EP with J Balvin released in 2019, won Top Latin Album at the 27th Billboards.

In 2020, Bad Bunny released his second solo album, YHLQMDLG. It earned him his first Grammy win for Best Latin Rock, Urban or Alternative Album at the 63rd Awards, after it was nominated for Album of the Year at the 21st Latin Grammys and Top Latin Album at the 28th Billboards and Latin Billboards. In May 2020, he released a collaborative mixtape, Las que no iban a salir, which was nominated for Top Latin Album at the 28th Billboards and Latin Billboards. Later in the same year, he also released his third solo album El Último Tour del Mundo. It won Best Urban Music Album at the 64th Grammys and 23rd Latin Grammys, and was nominated for Top Latin Album at the 28th Billboards and Latin Billboards.

In 2022, Bad Bunny released his fourth solo album Un Verano Sin Ti, which became the first Spanish-language album nominated for the most prestigious category at the Grammys, Album of the Year. It won Best Urban Music Album at the 65th Grammys and 23rd Latin Grammys, and Top Latin Album at the 30th Billboards and Latin Billboards. He was named Greatest Pop Star of 2022 by Billboard magazine, becoming the first male Latino and Hispanic, and Spanish-language artist to be recognized. In 2023, he released Nadie Sabe Lo Que Va a Pasar Mañana, his fifth solo album. It was nominated for Best Urban Music Album at the 67th Grammys and 25th Latin Grammys, and won Top Latin Album at the 31st Billboards and Latin Billboards.

In 2025, Bad Bunny released his sixth solo album Debí Tirar Más Fotos. At the 68th Grammys, he became the first Latino and Hispanic, and Spanish-language artist to be nominated in the same year for Album of the Year, Record of the Year, and Song of the Year, the three most prestigious categories. The all-Spanish-language album became the first Spanish-language work to win Album of the Year. It also won Album of the Year at the 26th Latin Grammys, making it the first album to win said category at both Awards. Additionally, it won Top Latin Album at the 32nd Latin Billboards, where Bad Bunny became the first artist to receive the Top Latin Artist of the 21st Century special award. He was also named Greatest Pop Star of 2025, becoming the first male, Latino and Hispanic, and Spanish-language artist to be recognized twice by Billboard magazine.

In 2026, he received his first Emmy Awards nomination, winning a Primetime Emmy Award for Outstanding Variety Special (Live) as the performer and a producer of the Super Bowl LX halftime show.

== Major awards ==
=== Emmy Awards ===
Year	Recipient(s)	Category	Result	Ref.
Primetime Emmy Awards
2026	Apple Music Super Bowl LX Halftime Show Starring Bad Bunny	Outstanding Variety Special (Live)	Won	

- In 2026, Bad Bunny’s Super Bowl LX halftime show received nine Emmy Awards nominations, winning seven awards. In addition to his nomination and win for Outstanding Variety Special (Live), the show landed seven nominations and wins for Outstanding Choreography for Variety or Reality Programming, Outstanding Directing for a Variety Special, Outstanding Lighting Design/Lighting Direction for a Special, Outstanding Music Direction, Outstanding Sound Mixing for a Variety Series or Special, and Outstanding Technical Direction and Camerawork for a Special. It also received nominations for Outstanding Production Design for a Variety Special and Outstanding Hairstyling for a Variety. With nine nominations, it became the most-nominated halftime show, surpassing the previous record of six nominations set by Lady Gaga’s Super Bowl LI performance in 2017. It also became the most-awarded halftime show with seven wins.

=== Grammy Awards ===
Year	Recipient(s)	Category	Result	Ref.
2019	"I Like It" (with Cardi B and J Balvin)	Record of the Year	Nominated	
2020	X 100pre	Best Latin Rock, Urban or Alternative Album	Nominated	
2020	Oasis (with J Balvin)	Best Latin Rock, Urban or Alternative Album	Nominated	
2021	"Un Día (One Day)" (with Dua Lipa, J Balvin and Tainy)	Best Pop Duo/Group Performance	Nominated	
2021	YHLQMDLG	Best Latin Pop or Urban Album	Won	
2022	El Último Tour Del Mundo	Best Música Urbana Album	Won	
2023	Un Verano Sin Ti	Best Música Urbana Album	Won	
2023	Un Verano Sin Ti	Album of the Year	Nominated	
2023	"Moscow Mule"	Best Pop Solo Performance	Nominated	
2025	Nadie Sabe Lo Que Va a Pasar Mañana	Best Música Urbana Album	Nominated	
2026	Debí Tirar Más Fotos	Best Música Urbana Album	Won	
2026	Debí Tirar Más Fotos	Album of the Year	Won	
2026	Debí Tirar Más Fotos	Best Album Cover	Nominated	
2026	"DtMF"	Record of the Year	Nominated	
2026	"DtMF"	Song of the Year	Nominated	
2026	"EoO"	Best Global Musical Performance	Won	

- In 2020, Bad Bunny (X 100pre and Oasis) became the first artist to be nominated twice in the same year for the Best Latin Rock, Urban or Alternative Album category.
- In 2021, Bad Bunny’s YHLQMDLG became the first reggaeton album to be nominated for and win the Best Latin Pop or Urban Album category.
- In 2022, Bad Bunny became the first winner of the Best Música Urbana Album category.
- In 2023, Bad Bunny’s Un Verano Sin Ti became the first Spanish-language album to be nominated for Album of the Year, the most prestigious category. His song "Moscow Mule" became the first Spanish-language song to be nominated for Best Pop Solo Performance. He also became the first consecutive winner of the Best Música Urbana Album category.
- In 2026, Bad Bunny became the first Latino, Hispanic, and Spanish-language artist to be nominated simultaneously or in the same year for Album of the Year (Debí Tirar Más Fotos), Record of the Year ("DtMF"), and Song of the Year ("DtMF"), the three most prestigious categories. The all-Spanish-language album Debí Tirar Más Fotos became the second Spanish-language work to be nominated for Album of the Year, after his own Un Verano Sin Ti in 2023. It became the first Spanish-language album to win the category. "DtMF" became the second all-Spanish song to be nominated in those categories, after "Despacito" by fellow Puerto Rican singers Luis Fonsi and Daddy Yankee in 2018. He also became the first Latino, Hispanic, and Spanish-language artist to be nominated for the Best Album Cover category. His song "Eoo" became the first reggaeton song to be nominated and win for Best Global Music Performance.

=== Latin Grammy Awards ===
Year	Recipient(s)	Category	Result	Ref.
2017	"Si Tu Novio Te Deja Sola" (with J Balvin)	Best Urban Fusion/Performance	Nominated	
2018	"Sensualidad" (with Prince Royce and J Balvin)	Best Urban Song	Nominated	
2019	X 100pre	Best Urban Music Album	Won	
2019	"Tenemos Que Hablar"	Best Urban Fusion/Performance	Nominated	
2020	"Vete"	Record of the Year	Nominated	
2020	YHLQMDLG	Album of the Year	Nominated	
2020	Oasis	Album of the Year	Nominated	
2020	"Hablamos Mañana" (with Duki & Pablo Chill-E)	Best Urban Fusion/Performance	Nominated	
2020	"Cántalo" (with Ricky Martin & Residente)	Best Urban Fusion/Performance	Nominated	
2020	"Yo Perreo Sola"	Best Reggaeton Performance	Won	
2020	YHLQMDLG	Best Urban Music Album	Nominated	
2020	Oasis	Best Urban Music Album	Nominated	
2020	"Kemba Walker" (with Eladio Carrion)	Best Rap/Hip Hop Song	Nominated	
2021	El Último Tour Del Mundo	Album of the Year	Nominated	
2021	El Último Tour Del Mundo	Best Urban Music Album	Won	
2021	"Booker T"	Best Rap/Hip Hop Song	Won	
2021	"Dakiti" (with Jhayco)	Best Urban Song	Nominated	
2022	Un Verano Sin Ti	Album of the Year	Nominated	
2022	Un Verano Sin Ti	Best Urban Music Album	Won	
2022	"Ojitos Lindos" (with Bomba Estéreo)	Record of the Year	Nominated	
2022	"Volví" (with Aventura)	Best Urban/Fusion Performance	Nominated	
2022	"Tití Me Preguntó"	Best Urban/Fusion Performance	Won	
2022	"Tití Me Preguntó"	Best Urban Song	Won	
2022	"Lo Siento BB:/" (with Tainy & Julieta Venegas)	Best Urban Song	Nominated	
2022	"Lo Siento BB:/" (with Tainy & Julieta Venegas)	Best Reggaeton Performance	Won	
2022	"Yonaguni"	Best Reggaeton Performance	Nominated	
2022	"De Museo"	Best Rap/Hip Hop Song	Won	
2023	"Un x100to" (with Grupo Frontera)	Song of the Year	Nominated	
2023	"Un x100to" (with Grupo Frontera)	Best Regional Mexican Song	Won	
2023	"La Jumpa" (with Arcángel)	Best Urban Fusion/Performance	Nominated	
2023	"La Jumpa" (with Arcángel)	Best Urban Song	Nominated	
2023	"Coco Chanel" (with Eladio Carrión)	Best Rap/Hip Hop Song	Won	
2024	"Mónaco"	Record of the Year	Nominated	
2024	Nadie Sabe Lo Que Va a Pasar Mañana	Best Urban Music Album	Nominated	
2024	"Nadie Sabe"	Best Urban Fusion/Performance	Nominated	
2024	"Perro Negro" (with Feid)	Best Reggaeton Performance	Won	
2024	"Un Preview"	Best Reggaeton Performance	Nominated	
2024	"Teléfono Nuevo" (with Luar La L)	Best Rap/Hip Hop Song	Nominated	
2024	"Thunder y Lightning" (with Eladio Carrión)	Best Rap/Hip Hop Song	Nominated	
2024	"Baticano"	Best Short Form Music Video	Nominated	
2025	"Baile Inolvidable"	Record of the Year	Nominated	
2025	"Baile Inolvidable"	Song of the Year	Nominated	
2025	"DtMF"	Record of the Year	Nominated	
2025	"DtMF"	Song of the Year	Nominated	
2025	"DtMF"	Best Urban Fusion/Performance	Won	
2025	"DtMF"	Best Urban Song	Won	
2025	"La Mudanza"	Best Urban Song	Nominated	
2025	"Voy a Llevarte Pa' PR"	Best Reggaeton Performance	Won	
2025	Debí Tirar Más Fotos	Album of the Year	Won	
2025	Debí Tirar Más Fotos	Best Urban Music Album	Won	
2025	"Lo Que Le Pasó A Hawaii"	Best Roots Song	Nominated	
2025	"El Clúb"	Best Short Form Music Video	Nominated	

=== Billboard Music Awards ===
Year	Recipient(s)	Category	Result	Ref.
2018	"Mayores" (with Becky G)	Top Latin Song	Nominated	
2019	Bad Bunny	Top Latin Artist	Nominated	
2019	X 100pre	Top Latin Album	Nominated	
2019	"Te Boté" (with Nio García, Darell, Casper Mágico, Nicky Jam and Ozuna)	Top Latin Song	Won	
2019	"Mia" (with Drake)	Top Latin Song	Nominated	
2019	"I Like It" (with Cardi B and J Balvin)	Top Hot 100 Song	Nominated	
2019	"I Like It" (with Cardi B and J Balvin)	Top Streaming Song (Audio)	Nominated	
2019	"I Like It" (with Cardi B and J Balvin)	Top Collaboration	Nominated	
2019	"I Like It" (with Cardi B and J Balvin)	Top Selling Song	Nominated	
2019	"I Like It" (with Cardi B and J Balvin)	Top Rap Song	Won	
2020	Bad Bunny	Top Latin Artist	Won	
2020	Oasis	Top Latin Album	Won	
2020	"No Me Conoce (Remix)" (with Jhayco and J Balvin)	Top Latin Song	Nominated	
2020	"Callaíta" (with Tainy)	Top Latin Song	Nominated	
2021	"Dakiti" (with Jhay Cortez)	Top Latin Song	Won	
2021	"Yo Perreo Sola"	Top Latin Song	Nominated	
2021	Bad Bunny	Top Latin Artist	Won	
2021	Bad Bunny	Top Latin Male Artist	Won	
2021	El Último Tour Del Mundo	Top Latin Album	Nominated	
2021	Las que no iban a salir	Top Latin Album	Nominated	
2021	YHLQMDLG	Top Latin Album	Won	
2022	Bad Bunny	Top Latin Artist	Won	
2022	Bad Bunny	Top Latin Male Artist	Won	
2022	El Último Tour del Mundo	Top Latin Tour	Nominated	
2022	"Volví" (with Aventura)	Top Latin Song	Nominated	
2022	"Yonaguni"	Top Latin Song	Nominated	
2023	Bad Bunny	Top Billboard Global 200 Artist	Nominated	
2023	Bad Bunny	Top Billboard Global (Excl. U.S.) Artist	Nominated	
2023	Bad Bunny	Top Latin Artist	Won	
2023	Bad Bunny	Top Latin Male Artist	Won	
2023	Un Verano Sin Ti	Top Latin Album	Won	
2023	"Un x100to" (with Grupo Frontera)	Top Latin Song	Nominated	
2024	"Perro Negro" (with Feid)	Top Latin Song	Nominated	
2024	"Mónaco"	Top Latin Song	Nominated	
2024	Bad Bunny	Top Latin Artist	Won	
2024	Bad Bunny	Top Latin Male Artist	Won	
2024	Bad Bunny	Top Latin Touring Artist	Nominated	
2024	Nadie Sabe Lo Que Va a Pasar Mañana	Top Latin Album	Won	

=== Billboard Latin Music Awards ===
Year	Recipient(s)	Category	Result	Ref.
2018	Bad Bunny	New Artist of the Year	Nominated	
2019	Bad Bunny	Artist of the Year	Nominated	
2019	Bad Bunny	Social Artist of the Year	Won	
2019	Bad Bunny	Male Hot Latin Songs Artist of the Year	Nominated	
2019	Bad Bunny	Latin Rhythm Artist of the Year	Nominated	
2019	"El Baño" (with Enrique Iglesias)	Latin Pop Song of the Year	Nominated	
2019	"Mia" (with Drake)	Vocal Event Hot Latin Song of the Year	Nominated	
2019	"Te Boté (Remix)" (with Nio Garcia, Darell, Casper Magico, Nicky Jam and Ozuna)	Vocal Event Hot Latin Song of the Year	Won	
2019	"Te Boté (Remix)" (with Nio Garcia, Darell, Casper Magico, Nicky Jam and Ozuna)	Hot Latin Song of the Year	Won	
2019	"Te Boté (Remix)" (with Nio Garcia, Darell, Casper Magico, Nicky Jam and Ozuna)	Airplay Song of the Year	Nominated	
2019	"Te Boté (Remix)" (with Nio Garcia, Darell, Casper Magico, Nicky Jam and Ozuna)	Digital Song of the Year	Nominated	
2019	"Te Boté (Remix)" (with Nio Garcia, Darell, Casper Magico, Nicky Jam and Ozuna)	Streaming Song of the Year	Won	
2019	"Te Boté (Remix)" (with Nio Garcia, Darell, Casper Magico, Nicky Jam and Ozuna)	Latin Rhythm Song of the Year	Nominated	
2020	Bad Bunny	Artist of the Year	Won	
2020	Bad Bunny	Male Top Latin Albums Artist of the Year	Won	
2020	Bad Bunny	Male Hot Latin Songs Artist of the Year	Won	
2020	Bad Bunny	Latin Rhythm Artist of the Year	Won	
2020	Bad Bunny	Songwriter of the Year	Won	
2020	"Callaíta" (with Tainy)	Vocal Event Hot Latin Song of the Year	Nominated	
2020	"Callaíta" (with Tainy)	Hot Latin Song of the Year	Nominated	
2020	"Callaíta" (with Tainy)	Digital Song of the Year	Nominated	
2020	"Callaíta" (with Tainy)	Latin Rhythm Song of the Year	Nominated	
2020	Oasis	Top Latin Album of the Year	Nominated	
2020	Oasis	Latin Rhythm Album of the Year	Nominated	
2020	X 100pre	Top Latin Album of the Year	Won	
2020	X 100pre	Latin Rhythm Album of the Year	Won	
2020	X 100pre World Tour	Tour of the Year	Nominated	
2021	Bad Bunny	Artist of the Year	Won	
2021	Bad Bunny	Male Hot Latin Songs Artist of the Year	Won	
2021	Bad Bunny	Male Top Albums Artist of the Year	Won	
2021	Bad Bunny	Latin Rhythm Artist of the Year	Won	
2021	Bad Bunny	Songwriter of the Year	Won	
2021	"La Noche de Anoche" (with Rosalía)	Vocal Event Hot Latin Song of the Year	Nominated	
2021	"Dakiti" (with Jhay Cortez)	Vocal Event Hot Latin Song of the Year	Won	
2021	"Dakiti" (with Jhay Cortez)	Hot Latin Song of the Year	Won	
2021	"Dakiti" (with Jhay Cortez)	Airplay Song of the Year	Nominated	
2021	"Dakiti" (with Jhay Cortez)	Sales Song of the Year	Nominated	
2021	"Dakiti" (with Jhay Cortez)	Streaming Song of the Year	Won	
2021	"Yo Perreo Sola"	Streaming Song of the Year	Nominated	
2021	"Vete"	Streaming Song of the Year	Nominated	
2021	"Safaera" (with Jowell & Randy and Ñengo Flow)	Streaming Song of the Year	Nominated	
2021	"Dakiti" (with Jhay Cortez)	Latin Rhythm Song of the Year	Nominated	
2021	"Yo Perreo Sola"	Latin Rhythm Song of the Year	Nominated	
2021	El Último Tour Del Mundo	Top Latin Album of the Year	Nominated	
2021	Las que no iban a salir	Top Latin Album of the Year	Nominated	
2021	YHLQMDLG	Top Latin Album of the Year	Won	
2021	El Último Tour Del Mundo	Latin Rhythm Album of the Year	Nominated	
2021	Las que no iban a salir	Latin Rhythm Album of the Year	Nominated	
2021	YHLQMDLG	Latin Rhythm Album of the Year	Won	
2022	Bad Bunny	Artist of the Year	Won	
2022	Bad Bunny	Tour of the Year	Won	
2022	Bad Bunny	Hot Latin Songs Artist of the Year, Male	Won	
2022	Bad Bunny	Top Latin Albums Artist of the Year, Male	Won	
2022	Bad Bunny	Latin Rhythm Artist of the Year, Solo	Won	
2022	Bad Bunny	Songwriter of the Year	Won	
2022	"Me Porto Bonito" (with Chencho Corleone)	Hot Latin Song of the Year	Nominated	
2022	"Me Porto Bonito" (with Chencho Corleone)	Hot Latin Song of the Year, Vocal Event	Nominated	
2022	"Me Porto Bonito" (with Chencho Corleone)	Latin Rhythm Song of the Year	Nominated	
2022	"Tití Me Preguntó"	Hot Latin Song of the Year	Nominated	
2022	"Yonaguni"	Hot Latin Song of the Year	Nominated	
2022	"Yonaguni"	Latin Rhythm Song of the Year	Nominated	
2022	"Volví" (with Aventura)	Latin Rhythm Song of the Year	Nominated	
2022	"Volví" (with Aventura)	Airplay Song of the Year	Nominated	
2022	"Volví" (with Aventura)	Tropical Song of the Year	Won	
2022	"Volví" (with Aventura)	Hot Latin Song of the Year, Vocal Event	Nominated	
2022	"Ojitos Lindos" (with Bomba Estéreo)	Hot Latin Song of the Year, Vocal Event	Nominated	
2022	"Party" (with Rauw Alejandro)	Hot Latin Song of the Year, Vocal Event	Nominated	
2022	Un Verano Sin Ti	Top Latin Album of the Year	Won	
2022	Un Verano Sin Ti	Latin Rhythm Album of the Year	Won	
2023	Bad Bunny	Artist of the Year	Won	
2023	Bad Bunny	Tour of the Year	Won	
2023	Bad Bunny	Global 200 Latin Artist of the Year	Won	
2023	Bad Bunny	Hot Latin Songs Artist of the Year, Male	Nominated	
2023	Bad Bunny	Top Latin Albums Artist of the Year, Male	Won	
2023	Bad Bunny	Latin Rhythm Artist of the Year, Solo	Won	
2023	Bad Bunny	Songwriter of the Year	Nominated	
2023	"Tití Me Preguntó"	Global 200 Latin Song of the Year	Nominated	
2023	"Tití Me Preguntó"	Sales Song of the Year	Won	
2023	"Tití Me Preguntó"	Latin Rhythm Song of the Year	Won	
2023	"Party" (with Rauw Alejandro)	Latin Rhythm Song of the Year	Nominated	
2023	"Un x100to" (with Grupo Frontera)	Hot Latin Song of the Year	Nominated	
2023	"Un x100to" (with Grupo Frontera)	Hot Latin Song of the Year, Vocal Event	Nominated	
2023	"Un x100to" (with Grupo Frontera)	Streaming Song of the Year	Nominated	
2023	"Un x100to" (with Grupo Frontera)	Regional Mexican Song of the Year	Nominated	
2024	Bad Bunny	Artist of the Year	Won	
2024	Bad Bunny	Global 200 Latin Artist of the Year	Nominated	
2024	Bad Bunny	Hot Latin Songs Artist of the Year, Male	Nominated	
2024	Bad Bunny	Top Latin Albums Artist of the Year, Male	Won	
2024	Bad Bunny	Latin Rhythm Artist of the Year, Solo	Won	
2024	"Perro Negro" (with Feid)	Global 200 Latin Song of the Year	Nominated	
2024	"Perro Negro" (with Feid)	Hot Latin Song of the Year	Nominated	
2024	"Perro Negro" (with Feid)	Hot Latin Song of the Year, Vocal Event	Nominated	
2024	"Perro Negro" (with Feid)	Streaming Song of the Year	Nominated	
2024	"Perro Negro" (with Feid)	Airplay Song of the Year	Nominated	
2024	"Mónaco"	Hot Latin Song of the Year	Nominated	
2024	"Mónaco"	Sales Song of the Year	Won	
2024	Nadie Sabe Lo Que Va a Pasar Mañana	Top Latin Album of the Year	Won	
2024	Nadie Sabe Lo Que Va a Pasar Mañana	Latin Rhythm Album of the Year	Won	
2024	Most Wanted Tour	Tour of the Year	Nominated	
2025	Bad Bunny	Latin Artist of the 21st Century Award	Honoree	
2025	Bad Bunny	Artist of the Year	Won	
2025	Bad Bunny	Global 200 Latin Artist of the Year	Won	
2025	Bad Bunny	Hot Latin Songs Artist of the Year, Male	Won	
2025	Bad Bunny	Top Latin Albums Artist of the Year, Male	Won	
2025	Bad Bunny	Latin Rhythm Artist of the Year, Solo	Won	
2025	Bad Bunny	Songwriter of the Year	Nominated	
2025	Debí Tirar Más Fotos	Top Latin Album of the Year	Won	
2025	Debí Tirar Más Fotos	Top Latin Rhythm Album of the Year	Won	
2025	"DtMF"	Global 200 Latin Song of the Year	Nominated	
2025	"DtMF"	Hot Latin Song of the Year	Won	
2025	"DtMF"	Sales Song of the Year	Nominated	
2025	"DtMF"	Streaming Song of the Year	Won	
2025	"DtMF"	Latin Rhythm Song of the Year	Won	
2025	"Baile Inolvidable"	Global 200 Latin Song of the Year	Nominated	
2025	"Baile Inolvidable"	Hot Latin Song of the Year	Nominated	
2025	"Baile Inolvidable"	Sales Song of the Year	Nominated	
2025	"Baile Inolvidable"	Streaming Song of the Year	Nominated	
2025	"Baile Inolvidable"	Tropical Song of the Year	Nominated	
2025	“Nuevayol”	Global 200 Latin Song of the Year	Nominated	
2025	“Nuevayol”	Hot Latin Song of the Year	Nominated	
2025	“Nuevayol”	Sales Song of the Year	Nominated	
2025	“Nuevayol”	Streaming Song of the Year	Nominated	
2025	“Nuevayol”	Latin Rhythm Song of the Year	Nominated	
2025	"Qué Pasaría..." (with Rauw Alejandro)	Hot Latin Song of the Year, Vocal Event	Nominated	
2025	"Qué Pasaría..." (with Rauw Alejandro)	Latin Rhythm Song of the Year	Nominated	
2025	"Eoo"	Hot Latin Song of the Year	Nominated	
2025	"Eoo"	Latin Rhythm Song of the Year	Nominated	
2026	Bad Bunny	Artist of the Year	Won	
2026	Bad Bunny	Tour of the Year	Won	
2026	Bad Bunny	Global 200 Latin Artist of the Year	Won	
2026	Bad Bunny	Hot Latin Songs Artist of the Year, Male	Won	
2026	Bad Bunny	Top Latin Albums Artist of the Year, Male	Won	
2026	Bad Bunny	Latin Rhythm Artist of the Year, Solo	Won	
2026	Bad Bunny	Songwriter of the Year	Won	

== Miscellaneous awards ==
Award	Year	Recipient(s)	Category	Result	Ref.
American Music Awards	2019	Bad Bunny	Favorite Artist – Latin	Nominated	
American Music Awards	2020	Bad Bunny	Favorite Male Artist – Latin	Won	
American Music Awards	2020	YHLQMDLG	Favorite Album – Latin	Won	
American Music Awards	2020	Las que no iban a salir	Favorite Album – Latin	Nominated	
American Music Awards	2020	"Vete"	Favorite Song – Latin	Nominated	
American Music Awards	2021	Bad Bunny	Favorite Male Artist – Latin	Won	
American Music Awards	2021	"Dakiti" (with Jhay Cortez)	Collaboration of the Year	Nominated	
American Music Awards	2021	"Dakiti" (with Jhay Cortez)	Favorite Song – Latin	Nominated	
American Music Awards	2021	"La Noche de Anoche" (with Rosalía)	Favorite Song – Latin	Nominated	
American Music Awards	2021	El Último Tour del Mundo	Favorite Album – Latin	Won	
American Music Awards	2022	Bad Bunny	Artist of the Year	Nominated	
American Music Awards	2022	Bad Bunny	Favorite Touring Artist	Nominated	
American Music Awards	2022	Bad Bunny	Favorite Male Pop Artist	Nominated	
American Music Awards	2022	Bad Bunny	Favorite Male Latin Artist	Won	
American Music Awards	2022	Un Verano Sin Ti	Favorite Pop Album	Nominated	
American Music Awards	2022	Un Verano Sin Ti	Favorite Latin Album	Won	
American Music Awards	2022	"Me Porto Bonito" (with Chencho Corleone)	Favorite Music Video	Nominated	
American Music Awards	2022	"Me Porto Bonito" (with Chencho Corleone)	Favorite Latin Song	Nominated	
American Music Awards	2025	Bad Bunny	Favorite Male Latin Artist	Won	
American Music Awards	2025	Debí Tirar Más Fotos	Favorite Latin Album	Won	
American Music Awards	2025	"DtMF"	Favorite Latin Song	Nominated	
American Music Awards	2026	Bad Bunny	Artist of the Year	Nominated	
American Music Awards	2026	Bad Bunny	Best Male Latin Artist	Won	
American Music Awards	2026	"Nuevayol"	Best Latin Song	Won	
Apple Music Awards	2022	Bad Bunny	Artist of the Year	Won	
ASCAP Latin Awards	2019	"I Like It" (with Cardi B and J Balvin)	Song of the Year	Won	
ASCAP Latin Awards	2019	"El Baño" (with Enrique Iglesias)	Winning Songs	Won	
ASCAP Latin Awards	2019	"Mia" (with Drake)	Winning Songs	Won	
ASCAP Latin Awards	2019	"Mayores" (with Becky G)	Winning Songs	Won	
ASCAP Latin Awards	2019	"Sensualidad" (with Prince Royce and J Balvin)	Winning Songs	Won	
ASCAP Latin Awards	2019	"Te Boté (Remix)" (with Nio Garcia, Darell, Casper Magico, Nicky Jam and Ozuna)	Winning Songs	Won	
ASCAP Latin Awards	2019	"Solita" (with Ozuna, Almighty and Wisin)	Winning Songs	Won	
ASCAP Latin Awards	2020	Bad Bunny	Songwriter of the Year	Won	
ASCAP Latin Awards	2020	"Solo de Mi"	Winning Songs	Won	
ASCAP Latin Awards	2020	"Ni Bien Ni Mal"	Winning Songs	Won	
ASCAP Latin Awards	2020	"Callaíta" (with Tainy)	Winning Songs	Won	
ASCAP Latin Awards	2020	"La Canción" (with J Balvin)	Winning Songs	Won	
ASCAP Latin Awards	2020	"No Me Conoce (Remix)" (with Jhay Cortez and J Balvin)	Winning Songs	Won	
ASCAP Latin Awards	2020	"Qué Pretendes" (with J Balvin)	Winning Songs	Won	
ASCAP Latin Awards	2020	"Soltera (Remix)" (with Daddy Yankee and Lunay)	Winning Songs	Won	
ASCAP Latin Awards	2021	"Dakiti" (with Jhay Cortez)	Winning Songs	Won	
ASCAP Latin Awards	2021	"La Difícil"	Winning Songs	Won	
ASCAP Latin Awards	2021	"La Santa" (with Daddy Yankee)	Winning Songs	Won	
ASCAP Latin Awards	2021	"Un Día (One Day)" (with Dua Lipa, J Balvin and Tainy)	Winning Songs	Won	
ASCAP Latin Awards	2021	"Vete"	Winning Songs	Won	
ASCAP Latin Awards	2021	"Yo Perreo Sola"	Winning Songs	Won	
ASCAP Latin Awards	2022	"Dakiti" (with Jhay Cortez)	Song of the Year	Won	
ASCAP Latin Awards	2022	"AM (Remix)" (with Nio Garcia & J Balvin)	Winning Songs	Won	
ASCAP Latin Awards	2022	"La Noche de Anoche" (with Rosalía)	Winning Songs	Won	
ASCAP Latin Awards	2022	"Te Mudaste"	Winning Songs	Won	
ASCAP Latin Awards	2022	"Volví" (with Aventura)	Winning Songs	Won	
ASCAP Latin Awards	2022	"Yonaguni"	Winning Songs	Won	
ASCAP Latin Awards	2023	"Me Porto Bonito" (with Chencho Corleone)	Song of the Year	Won	
ASCAP Latin Awards	2023	"Después de la Playa"	Winning Songs	Won	
ASCAP Latin Awards	2023	"Efecto"	Winning Songs	Won	
ASCAP Latin Awards	2023	"La Corriente" (with Tony Dize)	Winning Songs	Won	
ASCAP Latin Awards	2023	"Lo Siento BB:/" (with Tainy & Julieta Venegas)	Winning Songs	Won	
ASCAP Latin Awards	2023	"Moscow Mule"	Winning Songs	Won	
ASCAP Latin Awards	2023	"Neverita"	Winning Songs	Won	
ASCAP Latin Awards	2023	"Ojitos Lindos" (with Bomba Estéreo)	Winning Songs	Won	
ASCAP Latin Awards	2023	"Party" (with Rauw Alejandro)	Winning Songs	Won	
ASCAP Latin Awards	2023	"Tarot" (with Jhayco)	Winning Songs	Won	
ASCAP Latin Awards	2023	"Tití Me Preguntó"	Winning Songs	Won	
ASCAP Latin Awards	2023	"Un Ratito"	Winning Songs	Won	
ASCAP Latin Awards	2023	"Yo No Soy Celoso"	Winning Songs	Won	
ASCAP Latin Awards	2024	"Coco Chanel" (with Eladio Carrión)	Winning Songs	Won	
ASCAP Latin Awards	2024	"Gato de Noche" (with Ñengo Flow)	Winning Songs	Won	
ASCAP Latin Awards	2024	"Monaco"	Winning Songs	Won	
ASCAP Latin Awards	2024	"Un Preview"	Winning Songs	Won	
ASCAP Latin Awards	2024	"Un x100to" (with Grupo Frontera)	Winning Songs	Won	
ASCAP Latin Awards	2024	"Where She Goes"	Winning Songs	Won	
ASCAP Latin Awards	2025	"Adivino" (with Myke Towers)	Winning Songs	Won	
ASCAP Latin Awards	2025	"Perro Negro" (with Feid)	Winning Songs	Won	
ASCAP Pop Music Awards	2019	"I Like It" (with Cardi B and J Balvin)	Winning Songs	Won	
ASCAP Pop Music Awards	2022	"Dakiti" (with Jhay Cortez)	Winning Songs	Won	
ASCAP Pop Music Awards	2024	"Tití Me Preguntó"	Winning Songs	Won	
ASCAP Rhythm & Soul Awards	2019	"I Like It" (with Cardi B and J Balvin)	Winning Songs	Won	
ASCAP Rhythm & Soul Awards	2024	"Tití Me Preguntó"	Winning Songs	Won	
Berlin Music Video Awards	2020	"Bellacoso" (with Residente)	Best Director	Nominated	
Berlin Music Video Awards	2024	"Monaco"	Best Editor	Nominated	
BET Awards	2019	"I Like It" (with Cardi B and J Balvin)	Best Collaboration	Nominated	
BET Awards	2019	"I Like It" (with Cardi B and J Balvin)	Coca-Cola Viewers' Choice Award	Nominated	
BET Awards	2026	Bad Bunny	Fashion Vanguard Award	Nominated	
BET Hip Hop Awards	2018	"I Like It" (with Cardi B and J Balvin)	Best Hip-Hop Video	Nominated	
BET Hip Hop Awards	2018	"I Like It" (with Cardi B and J Balvin)	Best Collabo, Duo or Group	Nominated	
BET Hip Hop Awards	2018	"I Like It" (with Cardi B and J Balvin)	Single of the Year	Nominated	
BMI Latin Awards	2019	"El Baño" (with Enrique Iglesias)	Award Winning Songs	Won	
BMI Latin Awards	2019	"Mayores" (with Becky G)	Award Winning Songs	Won	
BMI Latin Awards	2019	"Sensualidad" (with Prince Royce and J Balvin)	Award Winning Songs	Won	
BMI Latin Awards	2019	"Te Boté (Remix)" (with Nio Garcia, Darell, Casper Magico, Nicky Jam and Ozuna)	Award Winning Songs	Won	
BMI Latin Awards	2020	"Amorfoda"	Award Winning Songs	Won	
BMI Latin Awards	2020	"Estamos Bien"	Award Winning Songs	Won	
BMI Latin Awards	2020	"Krippy Kush (Remix)" (with Farruko, Nicki Minaj, 21 Savage and Rvssian)	Award Winning Songs	Won	
BMI Latin Awards	2020	"Mia" (with Drake)	Award Winning Songs	Won	
BMI Latin Awards	2020	"Solita" (with Ozuna, Almighty and Wisin)	Award Winning Songs	Won	
BMI Latin Awards	2021	"Callaíta"	Contemporary Latin Song of the Year	Won	
BMI Latin Awards	2021	"Callaíta"	Award Winning Songs	Won	
BMI Latin Awards	2021	"La Canción" (with J Balvin)	Award Winning Songs	Won	
BMI Latin Awards	2021	"Ni Bien Ni Mal"	Award Winning Songs	Won	
BMI Latin Awards	2021	"No Me Conoce (Remix)" (with Jhay Cortez and J Balvin)	Award Winning Songs	Won	
BMI Latin Awards	2021	"Qué Pretendes" (with J Balvin)	Award Winning Songs	Won	
BMI Latin Awards	2021	"Solo de Mí"	Award Winning Songs	Won	
BMI Latin Awards	2021	"Soltera (Remix)" (with Daddy Yankee and Lunay)	Award Winning Songs	Won	
BMI Latin Awards	2021	"Vete"	Award Winning Songs	Won	
BMI Latin Awards	2022	"Dakiti" (with Jhay Cortez)	Contemporary Latin Song of the Year	Won	
BMI Latin Awards	2022	"Dakiti" (with Jhay Cortez)	Award Winning Songs	Won	
BMI Latin Awards	2022	"Ignorantes" (with Sech)	Award Winning Songs	Won	
BMI Latin Awards	2022	"La Difícil"	Award Winning Songs	Won	
BMI Latin Awards	2022	"La Noche de Anoche" (with Rosalía)	Award Winning Songs	Won	
BMI Latin Awards	2022	"La Santa" (with Daddy Yankee)	Award Winning Songs	Won	
BMI Latin Awards	2022	"Safaera" (with Jowell & Randy & Ñengo Flow)	Award Winning Songs	Won	
BMI Latin Awards	2022	"Un Día (One Day)" (with Dua Lipa, J Balvin and Tainy)	Award Winning Songs	Won	
BMI Latin Awards	2022	"Yo Perreo Sola"	Award Winning Songs	Won	
BMI Latin Awards	2023	"AM (Remix)" (with Nio Garcia & J Balvin)	Award Winning Songs	Won	
BMI Latin Awards	2023	"Lo Siento BB:/" (with Tainy & Julieta Venegas)	Award Winning Songs	Won	
BMI Latin Awards	2023	"Me Porto Bonito" (with Chencho Corleone)	Award Winning Songs	Won	
BMI Latin Awards	2023	"Moscow Mule"	Award Winning Songs	Won	
BMI Latin Awards	2023	"Te Mudaste"	Award Winning Songs	Won	
BMI Latin Awards	2023	"Tití Me Preguntó"	Award Winning Songs	Won	
BMI Latin Awards	2023	"Volví" (with Aventura)	Award Winning Songs	Won	
BMI Latin Awards	2023	"Yonaguni"	Award Winning Songs	Won	
BMI Latin Awards	2024	"Efecto"	Contemporary Latin Song of the Year	Won	
BMI Latin Awards	2024	"Aguacero"	Award Winning Songs	Won	
BMI Latin Awards	2024	"Andrea	Award Winning Songs	Won	
BMI Latin Awards	2024	"Después de la Playa"	Award Winning Songs	Won	
BMI Latin Awards	2024	"Dos Mil 16"	Award Winning Songs	Won	
BMI Latin Awards	2024	"Efecto"	Award Winning Songs	Won	
BMI Latin Awards	2024	"El Apagón"	Award Winning Songs	Won	
BMI Latin Awards	2024	"La Corriente" (with Tony Dize)	Award Winning Songs	Won	
BMI Latin Awards	2024	"La Jumpa" (with Arcángel)	Award Winning Songs	Won	
BMI Latin Awards	2024	"Neverita"	Award Winning Songs	Won	
BMI Latin Awards	2024	"Ojitos Lindos" (with Bomba Estéreo)	Award Winning Songs	Won	
BMI Latin Awards	2024	"Otro Atardecer" (with The Marías)	Award Winning Songs	Won	
BMI Latin Awards	2024	"Party" (with Rauw Alejandro)	Award Winning Songs	Won	
BMI Latin Awards	2024	"Tarot" (with Jhayco)	Award Winning Songs	Won	
BMI Latin Awards	2024	"Un Coco"	Award Winning Songs	Won	
BMI Latin Awards	2024	"Un Ratito"	Award Winning Songs	Won	
BMI Latin Awards	2024	"Un x100to" (with Grupo Frontera)	Award Winning Songs	Won	
BMI Latin Awards	2024	"Yo No Soy Celoso"	Award Winning Songs	Won	
BMI Latin Awards	2025	"Coco Chanel" (with Eladio Carrión)	Award Winning Songs	Won	
BMI Latin Awards	2025	"Fina" (with Young Miko)	Award Winning Songs	Won	
BMI Latin Awards	2025	"Gato de Noche" (with Ñengo Flow)	Award Winning Songs	Won	
BMI Latin Awards	2025	"Monaco"	Award Winning Songs	Won	
BMI Latin Awards	2025	"Perro Negro" (with Feid)	Award Winning Songs	Won	
BMI Latin Awards	2025	"Un Preview"	Award Winning Songs	Won	
BMI Latin Awards	2025	"Where She Goes"	Award Winning Songs	Won	
Breaktudo Awards	2021	"La Noche de Anoche" (with Rosalía)	Best International Collaboration	Nominated	
Breaktudo Awards	2021	"Un Día (One Day)" (with Dua Lipa, J Balvin and Tainy)	Best International Collaboration	Nominated	
Breaktudo Awards	2022	Bad Bunny	Best Latin Artist	Nominated	
Breaktudo Awards	2023	Bad Bunny	Best International Artist	Nominated	
Breaktudo Awards	2025	Bad Bunny	Best International Artist	Nominated	
Breaktudo Awards	2025	"Baile Inolvidable"	Latin Hit of the Year	Nominated	
Breaktudo Awards	2026	Bad Bunny	Best International Artist	Pending	
Brit Awards	2026	Bad Bunny	International Artist of the Year	Nominated	
Cannes Lions International Festival of Creativity	2023	"El Apagón - Aquí Vive Gente"	Excellence in Music Video	Shortlisted	
Cannes Lions International Festival of Creativity	2025	Tracking Bad Bunny (Debí Tirar Más Fotos)	Cultural Engagement	Gold	
Cannes Lions International Festival of Creativity	2025	Tracking Bad Bunny (Debí Tirar Más Fotos)	Partnerships with Music Talent	Bronze	
Cannes Lions International Festival of Creativity	2025	Tracking Bad Bunny (Debí Tirar Más Fotos)	Fan Engagement/Community Building	Shortlisted	
Caribbean Music Awards	2025	Bad Bunny	Artist of the Year (Latin Caribbean)	Won	
Clio Music Awards	2024	Bad Bunny Quizz (Spotify)	61 Seconds to Five Minutes (Film & Video)	Bronze	
Clio Music Awards	2024	Bad Bunny Quizz (Spotify)	Direction (Film & Video Craft)	Bronze	
Clio Music Awards	2026	Tracking Bad Bunny (Debí Tirar Más Fotos)	Other (Digital/Mobile, AI & Emerging Technologies)	Grand Gold	
Clio Music Awards	2026	Tracking Bad Bunny (Debí Tirar Más Fotos)	Digital/Mobile (Experience/Activation)	Grand Gold	
Clio Music Awards	2026	Tracking Bad Bunny (Debí Tirar Más Fotos)	Partnerships (Fan Engagement)	Grand Gold	
Clio Music Awards	2026	Tracking Bad Bunny (Debí Tirar Más Fotos)	Music Marketing Innovation	Grand Gold	
Clio Music Awards	2026	Tracking Bad Bunny (Debí Tirar Más Fotos)	Creative Effectiveness	Gold	
Clio Music Awards	2026	Tracking Bad Bunny (Debí Tirar Más Fotos)	Digital (Fan Engagement)	Gold	
Clio Music Awards	2026	Tracking Bad Bunny (Debí Tirar Más Fotos)	Social Media (Fan Engagement)	Gold	
Clio Music Awards	2026	Tracking Bad Bunny (Debí Tirar Más Fotos)	Partnerships, Sponsorships & Collaborations	Silver	
Clio Music Awards	2026	No Me Quiero Ir de Aquí	Concerts (Live Music)	Grand Gold	
Clio Music Awards	2026	Stream Vendor	Guerrilla (Experience/Activation)	Gold	
Creative Circle Awards	2026	"Nuevayol"	Music Video - Promo Film (single)	Gold	
Creative Circle Awards	2026	"Nuevayol"	Music Video - Editing (single)	Silver	
E! People's Choice Awards	2018	Bad Bunny	The Latin Artist of 2018	Nominated	
E! People's Choice Awards	2018	"I Like It" (with Cardi B and J Balvin)	The Song of 2018	Nominated	
E! People's Choice Awards	2019	Bad Bunny	The Male Artist of 2019	Nominated	
E! People's Choice Awards	2019	Bad Bunny	The Latin Artist of 2019	Nominated	
E! People's Choice Awards	2020	Bad Bunny	The Male Artist of 2020	Nominated	
E! People's Choice Awards	2020	Bad Bunny	The Latin Artist of 2020	Nominated	
E! People's Choice Awards	2020	YHLQMDLG	The Album of 2020	Nominated	
E! People's Choice Awards	2020	"Un Día (One Day)" (with Dua Lipa, J Balvin and Tainy)	The Music Video of 2020	Nominated	
E! People's Choice Awards	2021	Bad Bunny	The Male Artist of 2021	Nominated	
E! People's Choice Awards	2021	Bad Bunny	The Latin Artist of 2021	Won	
E! People's Choice Awards	2022	Bad Bunny	The Male Artist of 2022	Nominated	
E! People's Choice Awards	2022	Bad Bunny	The Latin Artist of 2022	Nominated	
E! People's Choice Awards	2022	Bad Bunny	The Social Celebrity of 2022	Nominated	
E! People's Choice Awards	2022	"Me Porto Bonito" (with Chencho Corleone)	The Song of 2022	Nominated	
E! People's Choice Awards	2022	"Party" (with Rauw Alejandro)	The Collaboration Song of 2022	Nominated	
E! People's Choice Awards	2022	World's Hottest Tour	The Concert Tour of 2022	Nominated	
E! People's Choice Awards	2022	Un Verano Sin Ti	The Album of 2022	Nominated	
E! People's Choice Awards	2023	Bad Bunny	The Male Artist of the Year	Nominated	
E! People's Choice Awards	2023	Bad Bunny	The Male Latin Artist of the Year	Won	
E! People's Choice Awards	2023	Nadie Sabe Lo Que Va a Pasar Mañana	Album of the Year	Nominated	
E! People's Choice Awards	2023	"Un x100to" (with Grupo Frontera)	The Collaboration Song of the Year	Nominated	
GLAAD Media Award	2023	Bad Bunny	Vanguard Award	Won	
Heat Latin Music Awards	2019	Bad Bunny	Best Urban Artist	Nominated	
Heat Latin Music Awards	2019	"Krippy Kush (Remix)" (with Farruko, Nicki Minaj, 21 Savage and Rvssian)	Best Collaboration	Nominated	
Heat Latin Music Awards	2019	"Sensualidad" (with J Balvin, Prince Royce, Mambo Kingz and DJ Luian)	Best Collaboration	Nominated	
Heat Latin Music Awards	2020	Bad Bunny	Best Male Artist	Nominated	
Heat Latin Music Awards	2020	Bad Bunny	Best Urban Artist	Nominated	
Heat Latin Music Awards	2020	"Mía" (with Drake)	Best Collaboration	Nominated	
Heat Latin Music Awards	2020	"Cuidao Por Ahí" (with J Balvin)	Best Music Video	Nominated	
Heat Latin Music Awards	2020	"¿Quién Tu Eres?"	Best Music Video	Nominated	
Heat Latin Music Awards	2021	Bad Bunny	Best Male Artist	Nominated	
Heat Latin Music Awards	2021	Bad Bunny	Best Urban Artist	Nominated	
Heat Latin Music Awards	2021	"Dákiti" (with Jhay Cortez)	Best Collaboration	Nominated	
Heat Latin Music Awards	2021	"La Noche de Anoche" (with Rosalía)	Best Video	Nominated	
Heat Latin Music Awards	2022	Bad Bunny	Best Male Artist	Nominated	
Heat Latin Music Awards	2022	Bad Bunny	Best Urban Artist	Nominated	
Heat Latin Music Awards	2022	"Volando (Remix)" (with Mora and Sech)	Best Collaboration	Nominated	
Heat Latin Music Awards	2022	"Volví" (with Aventura)	Best Video	Nominated	
Heat Latin Music Awards	2022	"Lo Siento BB:/" (with Tainy and Julieta Venegas)	Best Video	Nominated	
Heat Latin Music Awards	2023	Bad Bunny	Best Male Artist	Nominated	
Heat Latin Music Awards	2023	Bad Bunny	Best Urban Artist	Nominated	
Heat Latin Music Awards	2023	"Me Porto Bonito" (with Chencho Corleone)	Song of the Year	Nominated	
Heat Latin Music Awards	2023	"Tití Me Preguntó"	Song of the Year	Nominated	
Heat Latin Music Awards	2023	"Tití Me Preguntó"	Best Video	Nominated	
Heat Latin Music Awards	2023	"La Jumpa" (with Arcangel)	Best Collaboration	Won	
Heat Latin Music Awards	2024	Bad Bunny	Best Male Artist	Nominated	
Heat Latin Music Awards	2024	"Monaco"	Best Music Video	Nominated	
Heat Latin Music Awards	2024	"Perro Negro" (with Feid)	Best Collaboration	Nominated	
Heat Latin Music Awards	2024	Nadie Sabe Lo Que Va a Pasar Mañana	Album of the Year	Nominated	
Heat Latin Music Awards	2025	Bad Bunny	Best Male Artist	Nominated	
Heat Latin Music Awards	2025	"Turista"	Best Video	Nominated	
Heat Latin Music Awards	2025	"DTMF"	Best Viral Song	Nominated	
Heat Latin Music Awards	2025	"DTMF"	Song of the Year	Nominated	
Heat Latin Music Awards	2025	"Nuevayol"	Song of the Year	Nominated	
Heat Latin Music Awards	2025	Debí Tirar Más Fotos	Album of the Year	Won	
Heat Latin Music Awards	2026	Bad Bunny	Best Male Artist	Nominated	
Heat Latin Music Awards	2026	Bad Bunny	Best Urban Artist	Nominated	
Heat Latin Music Awards	2026	Debí Tirar Más Fotos	Album of the Year	Nominated	
Heat Latin Music Awards	2026	"Baile Inolvidable"	Song of the Year	Nominated	
Heat Latin Music Awards	2026	"DTMF"	Song of the Year	Nominated	
Heat Latin Music Awards	2026	"DTMF"	Best Music Video	Nominated	
Heat Latin Music Awards	2026	"Nuevayol"	Best Music Video	Nominated	
Heat Latin Music Awards	2026	"Veldá" (with Dei V & Omar Courtz)	Best Collaboration	Nominated	
Heat Latin Music Awards	2026	"Eoo"	Best Song for a Video game, Series or Movie	Nominated	
IFPI Awards	2022	Un Verano Sin Ti	Global Album of the Year	Won	
iHeartRadio Music Awards	2018	Bad Bunny	Best New Latin Artist	Nominated	
iHeartRadio Music Awards	2019	"I Like It" (with Cardi B and J Balvin)	Best Collaboration	Nominated	
iHeartRadio Music Awards	2019	"I Like It" (with Cardi B and J Balvin)	Hip-Hop Song of the Year	Nominated	
iHeartRadio Music Awards	2019	"I Like It" (with Cardi B and J Balvin)	Best Music Video	Nominated	
iHeartRadio Music Awards	2019	Bad Bunny	Latin Artist of the Year	Won	
iHeartRadio Music Awards	2020	"Mia" (with Drake)	Latin Pop/Urban Song of the Year	Nominated	
iHeartRadio Music Awards	2020	"Qué Pretendes" (with J Balvin)	Latin Pop/Urban Song of the Year	Nominated	
iHeartRadio Music Awards	2020	X 100pre	Latin Album of the Year	Won	
iHeartRadio Music Awards	2020	Bad Bunny	Latin Pop/Urban Artist of the Year	Nominated	
iHeartRadio Music Awards	2021	"Dakiti" (with Jhay Cortez)	Latin Pop/Reggaeton Song of the Year	Nominated	
iHeartRadio Music Awards	2021	Bad Bunny	Latin Pop/Reggaeton Artist of the Year	Nominated	
iHeartRadio Music Awards	2021	YHLQMDLG	Latin Pop/Reggaeton Album of the Year	Won	
iHeartRadio Music Awards	2022	"Yonaguni"	Latin Pop/Reggaeton Song of the Year	Nominated	
iHeartRadio Music Awards	2022	Bad Bunny	Latin Pop/Reggaeton Artist of the Year	Won	
iHeartRadio Music Awards	2023	"Me Porto Bonito" (with Chencho Corleone)	Latin Pop/Reggaeton Song of the Year	Nominated	
iHeartRadio Music Awards	2023	"Moscow Mule"	Latin Pop/Reggaeton Song of the Year	Nominated	
iHeartRadio Music Awards	2023	Bad Bunny	Latin Pop/Reggaeton Artist of the Year	Nominated	
iHeartRadio Music Awards	2023	Bad Bunny	Favorite Tour Style	Nominated	
iHeartRadio Music Awards	2023	"Tití Me Preguntó"	Best Music Video	Nominated	
iHeartRadio Music Awards	2023	Un Verano Sin Ti	Latin Album of the Year	Won	
iHeartRadio Music Awards	2024	Bad Bunny	Latin Pop/Reggaeton Artist of the Year	Nominated	
iHeartRadio Music Awards	2025	Bad Bunny	Latin Pop/Reggaeton Artist of the Year	Nominated	
iHeartRadio Music Awards	2025	"Perro Negro" (with Feid)	Latin Pop/Urban Song of the Year	Won	
iHeartRadio Music Awards	2026	Bad Bunny	Artist of the Year	Nominated	
iHeartRadio Music Awards	2026	Bad Bunny	Latin Pop/Urban Artist of the Year	Won	
iHeartRadio Music Awards	2026	"DTMF"	Latin Pop/Urban Song of the Year	Won	
iHeartRadio Music Awards	2026	"Qué Pasaría..." (with Rauw Alejandro)	Latin Pop/Urban Song of the Year	Nominated	
iHeartRadio Music Awards	2026	Debí Tirar Más Fotos	Latin Pop/Urban Album of the Year	Won	
iHeartRadio Music Awards	2026	"Baile Inolvidable"	Best Lyrics	Nominated	
iHeartRadio Music Awards	2026	"Baile Inolvidable"	Best Music Video	Nominated	
iHeartRadio Music Awards	2026	Happy Gilmore 2	Favorite On Screen	Nominated	
iHeartRadio Music Awards	2026	Debí Tirar Más Fotos World Tour	Favorite Tour Style	Nominated	
HipHopDX Year End Awards	2023	Bad Bunny	Best International Artist	Won	
Hollywood Music Video Awards	2026	"Nuevayol"	Best Latin	Won	
Hollywood Music Video Awards	2026	"Nuevayol"	Best Cinematography	Won	
Hollywood Music Video Awards	2026	"Nuevayol"	Best Directing	Nominated	
Hollywood Music Video Awards	2026	"Nuevayol"	Music Video of the Year	Nominated	
Hollywood Music Video Awards	2026	"Nuevayol"	Best Color Grading	Nominated	
iHeartRadio Titanium Award	2018	"I Like It" (with Cardi B & J Balvin)	1 Billion Total Audience Spins on iHeartRadio Stations	Won	
Latin American Music Awards	2018	Bad Bunny	Artist of the Year	Won	
Latin American Music Awards	2018	Bad Bunny	New Artist of the Year	Nominated	
Latin American Music Awards	2018	"Mayores" (with Becky G)	Song of the Year	Nominated	
Latin American Music Awards	2018	"Mayores" (with Becky G)	Favorite Song – Urban	Won	
Latin American Music Awards	2018	"El Baño" (with Enrique Iglesias)	Favorite Song – Pop	Nominated	
Latin American Music Awards	2019	Bad Bunny	Artist of the Year	Nominated	
Latin American Music Awards	2019	Bad Bunny	Favorite Male Artist	Nominated	
Latin American Music Awards	2019	Bad Bunny	Favorite Urban Artist	Nominated	
Latin American Music Awards	2019	"Mia" (with Drake)	Song of the Year	Nominated	
Latin American Music Awards	2019	"Mia" (with Drake)	Favorite Urban Song	Nominated	
Latin American Music Awards	2019	X 100pre	Album of the Year	Nominated	
Latin American Music Awards	2019	X 100pre	Favorite Urban Album	Nominated	
Latin American Music Awards	2019	X 100pre Tour	Favorite Tour	Nominated	
Latin American Music Awards	2021	Bad Bunny	Artist of the Year	Won	
Latin American Music Awards	2021	Bad Bunny	Favorite Male Artist	Won	
Latin American Music Awards	2021	Bad Bunny	Favorite Urban Artist	Won	
Latin American Music Awards	2021	Bad Bunny	Social Artist of the Year	Nominated	
Latin American Music Awards	2021	"Yo Perreo Sola"	Song of the Year	Nominated	
Latin American Music Awards	2021	"Yo Perreo Sola"	Favorite Urban Song	Nominated	
Latin American Music Awards	2021	YHLQMDLG	Album of the Year	Won	
Latin American Music Awards	2021	Las que no iban a salir	Favorite Urban Album	Won	
Latin American Music Awards	2022	Bad Bunny	Artist of the Year	Nominated	
Latin American Music Awards	2022	Bad Bunny	Favorite Male Artist	Won	
Latin American Music Awards	2022	Bad Bunny	Favorite Urban Artist	Nominated	
Latin American Music Awards	2022	"Dakiti" (with Jhay Cortez)	Song of the Year	Won	
Latin American Music Awards	2022	"Dakiti" (with Jhay Cortez)	Favorite Urban Song	Won	
Latin American Music Awards	2022	"Volví" (with Aventura)	Collaboration of the Year	Nominated	
Latin American Music Awards	2022	"Volví" (with Aventura)	Favorite Tropical Song	Won	
Latin American Music Awards	2022	"AM"	Viral Song of the Year	Won	
Latin American Music Awards	2022	El Último Tour Del Mundo	Album of the Year	Nominated	
Latin American Music Awards	2022	El Último Tour Del Mundo	Favorite Urban Album	Nominated	
Latin American Music Awards	2023	Bad Bunny	Artist of the Year	Nominated	
Latin American Music Awards	2023	Bad Bunny	Favorite Urban Artist	Nominated	
Latin American Music Awards	2023	Bad Bunny	Streaming Artist of the Year	Nominated	
Latin American Music Awards	2023	"Me Porto Bonito" (with Chencho Corleone)	Song of the Year	Nominated	
Latin American Music Awards	2023	"Me Porto Bonito" (with Chencho Corleone)	Collaboration of the Year	Nominated	
Latin American Music Awards	2023	"Me Porto Bonito" (with Chencho Corleone)	Best Collaboration - Pop/Urban	Nominated	
Latin American Music Awards	2023	"Tití Me Preguntó"	Favorite Urban Song	Won	
Latin American Music Awards	2023	"Después de la Playa"	Favorite Tropical Song	Nominated	
Latin American Music Awards	2023	Un Verano Sin Ti	Album of the Year	Won	
Latin American Music Awards	2023	Un Verano Sin Ti	Favorite Urban Album	Won	
Latin American Music Awards	2023	Worlds Hottest Tour	Tour of the Year	Nominated	
Latin American Music Awards	2024	Bad Bunny	Artist of the Year	Nominated	
Latin American Music Awards	2024	Bad Bunny	Sreaming Artist of the Year	Nominated	
Latin American Music Awards	2024	Bad Bunny	Global Latin Artist of the Year	Nominated	
Latin American Music Awards	2024	Bad Bunny	Best Urban Artist	Nominated	
Latin American Music Awards	2024	"Un x100to" (with Grupo Frontera)	Song of the Year	Nominated	
Latin American Music Awards	2024	"Un x100to" (with Grupo Frontera)	Collaboration of the Year	Nominated	
Latin American Music Awards	2024	"Un x100to" (with Grupo Frontera)	Global Latin Song of the Year	Nominated	
Latin American Music Awards	2024	"Where She Goes"	Best Urban Song	Nominated	
Latin American Music Awards	2024	"Me Porto Bonito" (with Chencho Corleone)	Best Urban Collaboration	Nominated	
Latin American Music Awards	2024	Nadie Sabe Lo Que Va a Pasar Mañana	Album of the Year	Nominated	
Latin American Music Awards	2024	Nadie Sabe Lo Que Va a Pasar Mañana	Best Urban Album	Nominated	
LOS40 Music Awards	2020	Bad Bunny	Best Urban Act	Nominated	
LOS40 Music Awards	2020	"Yo Perreo Sola"	Best Latin Video	Nominated	
LOS40 Music Awards	2021	"Dakiti" (with Jhay Cortez)	Best Latin Song	Nominated	
LOS40 Music Awards	2021	"La Noche de Anoche" (with Rosalia)	Best Latin Video	Nominated	
LOS40 Music Awards	2022	Un Verano Sin Ti	Best Latin Album	Nominated	
LOS40 Music Awards	2022	"Tití Me Preguntó"	Best Latin Song	Nominated	
LOS40 Music Awards	2022	Bad Bunny	Best Latin Urban Act or Producer	Nominated	
LOS40 Music Awards	2023	"Where She Goes"	Best Latin Urban Song	Nominated	
LOS40 Music Awards	2025	Bad Bunny	Best Urban Latin Act	Nominated	
LOS40 Music Awards	2025	"Nuevayol"	Best Latin Urban Song	Nominated	
LOS40 Music Awards	2025	Debí Tirar Más Fotos	Best Latin Urban Album	Won	
LOS40 Music Awards	2025	"Veldá" (with Omar Courtz & Dei V)	Best Urban Collaboration	Nominated	
LOS40 Music Awards	2025	"Qué Pasaría..." (with Rauw Alejandro)	Best Urban Collaboration	Nominated	
LOS40 Music Awards	2026	Debí Tirar Más Fotos World Tour	Best International Tour	Nominated	
LOS40 Music Awards	2026	Debí Tirar Más Fotos World Tour	Best Latin Tour or Concert	Won	
MTV Europe Music Awards	2019	Bad Bunny	Best Caribbean Act	Nominated	
MTV Europe Music Awards	2020	Bad Bunny	Best Caribbean Act	Won	
MTV Europe Music Awards	2020	Bad Bunny	Best Latin	Nominated	
MTV Europe Music Awards	2021	Bad Bunny	Best Latin	Nominated	
MTV Europe Music Awards	2021	Bad Bunny	Best Caribbean Act	Won	
MTV Europe Music Awards	2022	Bad Bunny	Best Caribbean Act	Nominated	
MTV Europe Music Awards	2022	Bad Bunny	Best Latin	Nominated	
MTV Europe Music Awards	2022	"Me Porto Bonito" (with Chencho Corleone)	Best Song	Nominated	
MTV Europe Music Awards	2022	"Me Porto Bonito" (with Chencho Corleone)	Best Collaboration	Nominated	
MTV Europe Music Awards	2023	Bad Bunny	Best Latin	Nominated	
MTV Europe Music Awards	2024	Bad Bunny	Best Latin	Nominated	
MTV Millennial Awards	2018	"Amorfoda"	Video of the Year	Nominated	
MTV Millennial Awards	2018	"Sensualidad" (with Prince Royce and J Balvin)	Collaboration of the Year	Won	
MTV Millennial Awards	2018	"El Baño" (with Enrique Iglesias)	Collaboration of the Year	Nominated	
MTV Millennial Awards	2019	"I Like It" (with Cardi B and J Balvin)	Hit Global	Nominated	
MTV Millennial Awards	2019	"Mia" (with Drake)	Hit of the Year	Nominated	
MTV Millennial Awards	2019	"Mia" (with Drake)	Music-Ship of the Year	Nominated	
MTV Millennial Awards	2019	Bad Bunny	MIAW Artist	Won	
MTV Millennial Awards	2019	Bad Bunny	Global instagramer	Nominated	
MTV Millennial Awards	2021	"Dakiti" (with Jhay Cortez)	Hit of the Year	Nominated	
MTV Millennial Awards	2021	"La Noche de Anoche" (with Rosalía)	Video of the Year	Won	
MTV Millennial Awards	2021	"La Noche de Anoche" (with Rosalía)	Music-Ship of the Year	Nominated	
MTV Millennial Awards	2021	Bad Bunny	MIAW Artist	Won	
MTV Millennial Awards	2021	Bad Bunny	MIAW Instagram Stories User	Nominated	
MTV Millennial Awards	2022	"Lo Siento BB:/" (with Tainy and Julieta Venegas)	Viral Anthem	Nominated	
MTV Millennial Awards	2022	"X Última Vez" (with Daddy Yankee)	Music-Ship of the Year	Nominated	
MTV Millennial Awards	2022	Bad Bunny	MIAW Artist	Nominated	
MTV Millennial Awards	2022	Bad Bunny	Styler of the Year	Nominated	
MTV Millennial Awards	2023	Bad Bunny	MIAW Artist	Nominated	
MTV Millennial Awards	2023	"La Jumpa" (with Arcángel)	Reggaeton Hit	Nominated	
MTV Millennial Awards	2023	"Un x100to" (with Grupo Frontera)	Global Hit of the Year	Nominated	
MTV Millennial Awards	2023	"Un x100to" (with Grupo Frontera)	Music Ship of the Year	Nominated	
MTV Millennial Awards	2023	"Where She Goes"	Video of the Year	Nominated	
MTV Millennial Awards	2023	Bad Bunny throws a cellphone	Viral Bomb	Nominated	
MTV Millennial Awards	2024	"No Me Quiero Casar"	Video of the Year	Nominated	
MTV Millennial Awards Brazil	2019	"I Like It" (with Cardi B and J Balvin)	Hit Global	Nominated	
MTV Millennial Awards Brazil	2022	Himself	¡Me Gusta!	Nominated	
MTV Movie & TV Awards	2023	Bad Bunny	Best Breakthrough Performance	Nominated	
MTV Movie & TV Awards	2023	Brad Pitt (Ladybug) vs. Bad Bunny (The Wolf) – Bullet Train	Best Fight	Nominated	
MTV Video Music Awards	2018	"I Like It" (with Cardi B and J Balvin)	Song of Summer	Won	
MTV Video Music Awards	2019	"Mia" (with Drake)	Best Latin	Nominated	
MTV Video Music Awards	2020	"Yo Perreo Sola"	Best Latin	Nominated	
MTV Video Music Awards	2021	"Dakiti" (with Jhay Cortez)	Best Latin	Nominated	
MTV Video Music Awards	2021	"Un Día (One Day)" (with Dua Lipa, J Balvin and Tainy)	Best Latin	Nominated	
MTV Video Music Awards	2022	"Tití Me Preguntó"	Best Latin	Nominated	
MTV Video Music Awards	2022	Bad Bunny	Artist of the Year	Won	
MTV Video Music Awards	2022	"Me Porto Bonito" (with Chencho Corleone)	Song of Summer	Nominated	
MTV Video Music Awards	2022	Un Verano Sin Ti	Album of the Year	Nominated	
MTV Video Music Awards	2023	"Where She Goes"	Best Latin	Nominated	
MTV Video Music Awards	2023	"Un x100to" (with Grupo Frontera)	Best Latin	Nominated	
MTV Video Music Awards	2023	"El Apagón - Aquí Vive Gente"	Video for Good	Nominated	
MTV Video Music Awards	2024	Bad Bunny	Artist of the Year	Nominated	
MTV Video Music Awards	2024	"Monaco"	Best Latin	Nominated	
MTV Video Music Awards	2025	Bad Bunny	Artist of the Year	Nominated	
MTV Video Music Awards	2025	"Baile Inolvidable"	Best Latin	Nominated	
MTV Video Music Awards	2025	Debí Tirar Más Fotos	Best Album	Nominated	
MTV Video Music Awards	2025	Debí Tirar Más Fotos (Short Film)	Best Long Form Video	Nominated	
MTV Video Music Awards	2026	"Nuevayol"	Best Latin	Won	
Nickelodeon Kids' Choice Awards	2023	Bad Bunny	Favorite Male Artist	Nominated	
Nickelodeon Kids' Choice Awards	2023	Bad Bunny	Favorite Global Music Star	Nominated	
Nickelodeon Kids' Choice Awards	2024	Bad Bunny	Favorite Male Artist	Nominated	
Nickelodeon Kids' Choice Awards	2024	Most Wanted Tour	Favorite Ticket of the Year	Nominated	
Nickelodeon Kids' Choice Awards	2025	Bad Bunny	Favorite Male Artist	Nominated	
NRJ Music Awards	2025	"DTMF"	Social Success	Nominated	
NRJ Music Awards	2026	Bad Bunny	International Male Artist of the Year	Won	
NRJ Music Awards	2026	"Nuevayol"	International Hit of the Year	Won	
Pollstar Awards	2023	World's Hottest Tour	Major Tour of the Year	Nominated	
Pollstar Awards	2023	World's Hottest Tour	The Dayum! Awards	Won	
Pollstar Awards	2023	World's Hottest Tour	Latin Tour of the Year	Won	
Pollstar Awards	2025	Most Wanted Tour	Latin Tour of the Year	Won	
Pollstar Awards	2026	Debí Tirar Más Fotos World Tour	Latin Tour of the Year	Won	
Pollstar Awards	2026	No Me Quiero Ir de Aquí	Residency of the Year	Nominated	
Premios Juventud	2017	Bad Bunny	Breakthrough Artist	Nominated	
Premios Juventud	2019	"Mia" (with Drake)	The Traffic Jam	Nominated	
Premios Juventud	2019	"Mia" (with Drake)	Can't Get Enough of This Song	Nominated	
Premios Juventud	2019	Bad Bunny	Singer + Songwriter + Composer	Nominated	
Premios Juventud	2019	Bad Bunny	Can't Get Enough...	Won	
Premios Juventud	2019	Bad Bunny	Scroll Stopper	Won	
Premios Juventud	2019	Bad Bunny	Street Style	Won	
Premios Juventud	2019	Bad Bunny	Hair Obsessed	Nominated	
Premios Juventud	2020	Bad Bunny	Trendsetter	Won	
Premios Juventud	2020	Bad Bunny	Nailed It	Won	
Premios Juventud	2020	Bad Bunny	Sneakerhead	Won	
Premios Juventud	2020	Bad Bunny	High Fashion	Won	
Premios Juventud	2020	Bad Bunny	Scroll Stopper	Won	
Premios Juventud	2020	Bad Bunny	Can't Get Enough	Won	
Premios Juventud	2020	"En Casita" (with Gabriela)	The Quarentune	Won	
Premios Juventud	2020	"Soy El Diablo (Remix)" (with Natanael Cano)	OMG Collaboration	Won	
Premios Juventud	2021	Bad Bunny	Male Youth Artist of the Year	Won	
Premios Juventud	2021	"Dakiti" (with Jhay Cortez)	Song of the Year	Won	
Premios Juventud	2021	"Dakiti" (with Jhay Cortez)	Viral Track of the Year	Won	
Premios Juventud	2021	"Un Día (One Day)" (with Dua Lipa, J Balvin and Tainy)	OMG Collaboration	Nominated	
Premios Juventud	2021	"Un Día (One Day)" (with Dua Lipa, J Balvin and Tainy)	Most Powerful Message Video	Won	
Premios Juventud	2021	El Último Tour del Mundo	Album of the Year	Won	
Premios Juventud	2022	Bad Bunny	Male Youth Artist of the Year	Won	
Premios Juventud	2022	Bad Bunny	My Favorite Streaming Artist	Nominated	
Premios Juventud	2022	Bad Bunny	Trendiest Artist	Nominated	
Premios Juventud	2022	"Volví" (with Aventura)	The Perfect Mix	Nominated	
Premios Juventud	2022	"Yonaguni"	Viral Track of the Year	Nominated	
Premios Juventud	2023	Bad Bunny	Artist of the Youth – Male	Nominated	
Premios Juventud	2023	Bad Bunny	My Favorite Streaming Artist	Nominated	
Premios Juventud	2023	Bad Bunny	My Favorite Trendsetter	Won	
Premios Juventud	2023	"Un x100to" (with Grupo Frontera)	Best Song for My Ex	Nominated	
Premios Juventud	2023	"Un x100to" (with Grupo Frontera)	Best Regional Mexican Fusion	Won	
Premios Juventud	2023	"Tití Me Preguntó"	Best Urban Track	Nominated	
Premios Juventud	2023	"Me Porto Bonito" (with Chencho Corleone)	Best Urban Mix	Nominated	
Premios Juventud	2023	"Coco Chanel" (with Eladio Carrión)	Best Trap Song	Won	
Premios Juventud	2023	Un Verano Sin Ti	Best Urban Album – Male	Won	
Premios Juventud	2024	Bad Bunny	Artist of the Youth – Male	Nominated	
Premios Juventud	2024	"K-pop" (with Travis Scott & The Weeknd)	OMG Collaboration	Nominated	
Premios Juventud	2024	"Monaco"	Best Urban Track	Nominated	
Premios Juventud	2024	Nadie Sabe Lo Que Va a Pasar Mañana	Best Urban Album	Nominated	
Premios Juventud	2025	Bad Bunny	Artist of the Youth	Nominated	
Premios Juventud	2025	Debí Tirar Más Fotos	Best Urban Album	Won	
Premios Juventud	2025	"DtMF"	Best Urban Track	Won	
Premios Juventud	2025	"Adivino" (with Myke Towers)	Best Urban Mix	Won	
Premios Juventud	2025	"Nuevayol"	Best Urban/Pop Song	Nominated	
Premios Juventud	2025	"Baile Inolvidable"	Tropical Hit	Nominated	
Premios Juventud	2026	Bad Bunny	Artist of the Youth – Male	Won	
Premios Juventud	2026	Debí Tirar Más Fotos World Tour	Best Tour	Won	
Premios Juventud	2026	"Alambre Púa"	Best Urban Track	Nominated	
Premios Lo Nuestro	2019	"Dura (Remix)" (with Daddy Yankee, Natti Natasha & Becky G)	Urban Song of the Year	Nominated	
Premios Lo Nuestro	2019	"El Baño (Remix)" (with Enrique Iglesias & Natti Natasha)	Urban Song of the Year	Nominated	
Premios Lo Nuestro	2019	Bad Bunny	Male Urban Artist of the Year	Nominated	
Premios Lo Nuestro	2019	"Dura (Remix)" (with Daddy Yankee, Natti Natasha & Becky G)	Remix of the Year	Nominated	
Premios Lo Nuestro	2019	"El Baño (Remix)" (with Enrique Iglesias & Natti Natasha)	Remix of the Year	Nominated	
Premios Lo Nuestro	2019	"Te Boté (Remix)" (with Nio Garcia, Darell, Casper Magico, Nicky Jam and Ozuna)	Remix of the Year	Won	
Premios Lo Nuestro	2019	"Dura (Remix)" (with Daddy Yankee, Natti Natasha & Becky G)	Urban Collaboration of the Year	Nominated	
Premios Lo Nuestro	2019	"El Baño (Remix)" (with Enrique Iglesias & Natti Natasha)	Urban Collaboration of the Year	Nominated	
Premios Lo Nuestro	2019	"Está Rico" (with Marc Anthony & Will Smith)	Crossover Collaboration of the Year	Nominated	
Premios Lo Nuestro	2019	"I Like It" (with Cardi B and J Balvin)	Crossover Collaboration of the Year	Nominated	
Premios Lo Nuestro	2019	"Mia" (with Drake)	Crossover Collaboration of the Year	Nominated	
Premios Lo Nuestro	2019	La Nueva Religión Tour PT. 2	Tour of the Year	Nominated	
Premios Lo Nuestro	2020	Bad Bunny	Male Urban Artist of the Year	Nominated	
Premios Lo Nuestro	2020	"Soltera" (Remix) (with Daddy Yankee and Lunay)	Remix of the Year	Won	
Premios Lo Nuestro	2020	"Flor" (with Los Rivera Destino)	Video of the Year	Won	
Premios Lo Nuestro	2020	"Qué Pretendes" (with J Balvin)	Urban Song of the Year	Nominated	
Premios Lo Nuestro	2020	"Qué Pretendes" (with J Balvin)	Urban Collaboration of the Year	Nominated	
Premios Lo Nuestro	2020	"Callaíta" (with Tainy)	Urban/Trap Song of the Year	Won	
Premios Lo Nuestro	2020	"No Me Conoce" (Remix) (with Jhay Cortez and J Balvin)	Urban/Trap Song of the Year	Nominated	
Premios Lo Nuestro	2020	Oasis	Album of the Year	Won	
Premios Lo Nuestro	2020	X 100pre Tour	Tour of the Year	Won	
Premios Lo Nuestro	2021	Bad Bunny	Artist of the Year	Won	
Premios Lo Nuestro	2021	Bad Bunny	Male Ubran Artist of the Year	Won	
Premios Lo Nuestro	2021	"La Difícil"	Urban Song of the Year	Won	
Premios Lo Nuestro	2021	"Vete"	Urban/Trap Song of the Year	Won	
Premios Lo Nuestro	2021	"Un Día (One Day)" (with Dua Lipa, J Balvin and Tainy)	Crossover Collaboration of the Year	Won	
Premios Lo Nuestro	2021	YHLQMDLG	Album of the Year	Won	
Premios Lo Nuestro	2021	YHLQMDLG	Urban Album of the Year	Won	
Premios Lo Nuestro	2022	Bad Bunny	Artist of the Year	Won	
Premios Lo Nuestro	2022	Bad Bunny	Urban Artist of the Year	Won	
Premios Lo Nuestro	2022	"Dakiti" (with Jhay Cortez)	Song of the Year	Nominated	
Premios Lo Nuestro	2022	"Dakiti" (with Jhay Cortez)	Urban Song of the Year	Nominated	
Premios Lo Nuestro	2022	"Volví" (with Aventura)	The Perfect Mix of the Year	Won	
Premios Lo Nuestro	2022	"AM" (Remix) (with Nio Garcia & J Balvin)	Urban Collaboration Of The Year	Won	
Premios Lo Nuestro	2022	"La Noche de Anoche" (with Rosalía)	Urban Collaboration Of The Year	Nominated	
Premios Lo Nuestro	2022	El Último Tour Del Mundo	Album of the Year	Won	
Premios Lo Nuestro	2022	El Último Tour Del Mundo	Urban Album of the Year	Won	
Premios Lo Nuestro	2023	Bad Bunny	Artist of the Year	Nominated	
Premios Lo Nuestro	2023	Bad Bunny	Male Urban Artist of the Year	Nominated	
Premios Lo Nuestro	2023	"Moscow Mule"	Song of the Year	Nominated	
Premios Lo Nuestro	2023	"Moscow Mule"	Urban Song of the Year	Nominated	
Premios Lo Nuestro	2023	"Lo Siento BB:/" (with Tainy and Julieta Venegas)	Urban Collaboration of the Year	Nominated	
Premios Lo Nuestro	2023	"Me Porto Bonito" (with Chencho Corleone)	Urban Collaboration of the Year	Won	
Premios Lo Nuestro	2023	Un Verano Sin Ti	Album of the Year	Won	
Premios Lo Nuestro	2023	Un Verano Sin Ti	Urban Album of the Year	Won	
Premios Lo Nuestro	2023	El Último Tour Del Mundo & World's Hottest Tour	Tour of the Year	Nominated	
Premios Lo Nuestro	2024	Bad Bunny	Artist of the Year	Nominated	
Premios Lo Nuestro	2024	Bad Bunny	Male Urban Artist of the Year	Nominated	
Premios Lo Nuestro	2024	"Un x100to" (with Grupo Frontera)	Song of the Year	Nominated	
Premios Lo Nuestro	2024	"Un x100to" (with Grupo Frontera)	The Perfect Mix of the Year	Nominated	
Premios Lo Nuestro	2024	"Where She Goes"	Urban Song of the Year	Nominated	
Premios Lo Nuestro	2024	"La Jumpa" (with Arcángel)	Urban Collaboration of the Year	Nominated	
Premios Lo Nuestro	2025	Bad Bunny	Male Urban Artist of the Year	Nominated	
Premios Lo Nuestro	2025	Nadie Sabe Lo Que Va a Pasar Mañana	Album of the Year	Nominated	
Premios Lo Nuestro	2025	Nadie Sabe Lo Que Va a Pasar Mañana	Urban Album of the Year	Nominated	
Premios Lo Nuestro	2025	Most Wanted Tour	Tour of the Year	Nominated	
Premios Lo Nuestro	2025	"Un Preview"	Urban Song of the Year	Nominated	
Premios Lo Nuestro	2025	"Perro Negro" (with Feid)	Urban Collaboration of the Year	Won	
Premios Lo Nuestro	2025	"Mónaco"	Best Urban Trap/Hip Hop Song	Won	
Premios Lo Nuestro	2026	Bad Bunny	Artist of the Year	Won	
Premios Lo Nuestro	2026	"DMTF"	Song of the Year	Won	
Premios Lo Nuestro	2026	Debí Tirar Más Fotos	Album of the Year	Won	
Premios Lo Nuestro	2026	"Weltita" (with Chuwi)	The Perfect Mix of the Year	Nominated	
Premios Lo Nuestro	2026	No Me Quiero Ir de Aquí Residencia	Tour of the Year	Nominated	
Premios Lo Nuestro	2026	Bad Bunny	Urban Artist of the Year	Won	
Premios Lo Nuestro	2026	"Que Pasaría…" (with Rauw Alejandro)	Urban Song of the Year	Nominated	
Premios Lo Nuestro	2026	"Perfumito Nuevo…" (with RaiNao)	Urban Collaboration of the Year	Nominated	
Premios Lo Nuestro	2026	"DTMF"	Pop/Urban Song of the Year	Won	
Premios Lo Nuestro	2026	"Café Con Ron" (with Los Pleneros de la Cresta)	Tropical Collaboration of the Year	Won	
Premios Odeón	2020	Bad Bunny	Latin Artist of the Year	Nominated	
Premios Odeón	2021	Bad Bunny	Latin Artist of the Year	Won	
Premios Odeón	2023	Un Verano Sin Ti	Best Latin Album	Won	
Premios Odeón	2026	Debí Tirar Más Fotos	Best Latin Album	Won	
Premios Musa	2020	Bad Bunny	Latin International Artist of the Year	Won	
Premios Musa	2020	"Un Día (One Day)" (with Dua Lipa, J Balvin and Tainy)	International Collaboration of the Year	Nominated	
Premios Musa	2020	"Yo Perreo Sola"	Latin International Song of the Year	Nominated	
Premios Musa	2022	Bad Bunny	Latin International Artist of the Year	Won	
Premios Musa	2022	"Ojitos Lindos" (with Bomba Estereo)	International Collaboration of the Year	Won	
Premios Musa	2022	"Efecto"	Latin International Song of the Year	Won	
Premios Musa	2023	Bad Bunny	Latin International Artist of the Year	Nominated	
Premios Musa	2023	"La Jumpa" (with Árcangel)	International Collaboration of the Year	Nominated	
Premios Nuestra Tierra	2023	"Ojitos Lindos" (with Bomba Estereo)	Best Urban Song	Nominated	
Premios Nuestra Tierra	2023	"Ojitos Lindos" (with Bomba Estereo)	Best Alternative/Rock/Indie Song	Won	
Premios Nuestra Tierra	2024	"Perro Negro" (with Feid)	Best Urban Collaboration	Nominated	
Soul Train Music Awards	2018	"I Like It" (with Cardi B and J Balvin)	Rhythm & Bars Award	Nominated	
Premios Tu Música Urbano	2019	Bad Bunny	Artist of the Year	Nominated	
Premios Tu Música Urbano	2019	Bad Bunny	Male Urban Artist	Nominated	
Premios Tu Música Urbano	2019	Bad Bunny	Humanitarian Award of the Year	Nominated	
Premios Tu Música Urbano	2019	"I Like It" (with Cardi B and J Balvin)	International Artist Song	Nominated	
Premios Tu Música Urbano	2019	"I Like It" (with Cardi B and J Balvin)	International Artist Video	Nominated	
Premios Tu Música Urbano	2019	"Te Boté (Remix)" (with Nio Garcia, Darell, Casper Magico, Nicky Jam and Ozuna)	Video of the Year	Won	
Premios Tu Música Urbano	2019	"Te Boté (Remix)" (with Nio Garcia, Darell, Casper Magico, Nicky Jam and Ozuna)	Remix of the Year	Won	
Premios Tu Música Urbano	2019	"Dura (Remix)" (with Daddy Yankee, Natti Natasha & Becky G)	Remix of the Year	Nominated	
Premios Tu Música Urbano	2019	"Está Rico" (with Marc Anthony & Will Smith)	Collaboration of the Year	Nominated	
Premios Tu Música Urbano	2019	"Mia" (with Drake)	Collaboration of the Year	Nominated	
Premios Tu Música Urbano	2019	"Te Guste" (with Jennifer Lopez)	Collaboration of the Year	Nominated	
Premios Tu Música Urbano	2019	X 100pre	Album of the Year	Nominated	
Premios Tu Música Urbano	2019	"Estamos Bien"	Song of the Year	Nominated	
Premios Tu Música Urbano	2019	Trap Kingz	Concert of the Year	Nominated	
Premios Tu Música Urbano	2020	Bad Bunny	Top Male Artist	Nominated	
Premios Tu Música Urbano	2020	Bad Bunny	Artist of the Year	Nominated	
Premios Tu Música Urbano	2020	"Soltera" (with Daddy Yankee and Lunay)	Remix of the Year New Generation	Won	
Premios Tu Música Urbano	2020	"No Me Conoce" (with Jhay Cortez and J Balvin)	Remix of the Year New Generation	Nominated	
Premios Tu Música Urbano	2020	"La Canción" (with J Balvin)	Song of the Year	Nominated	
Premios Tu Música Urbano	2020	"Soltera" (with Daddy Yankee and Lunay)	Song of the Year	Nominated	
Premios Tu Música Urbano	2020	"Callaíta" (with Tainy)	Song of the Year	Nominated	
Premios Tu Música Urbano	2020	"La Canción" (with J Balvin)	Video of the Year	Nominated	
Premios Tu Música Urbano	2020	"No Me Conoce" (with Jhay Cortez and J Balvin)	Video of the Year	Nominated	
Premios Tu Música Urbano	2020	"Soltera (Remix)" (with Daddy Yankee and Lunay)	Video of the Year	Nominated	
Premios Tu Música Urbano	2020	"Vete"	Video of the Year	Nominated	
Premios Tu Música Urbano	2020	"Callaíta" (with Tainy)	Male Song of the Year	Nominated	
Premios Tu Música Urbano	2020	"Bellacoso" (with Residente)	Collaboration Of The Year	Nominated	
Premios Tu Música Urbano	2020	"La Cancion" (with J Balvin)	Collaboration Of The Year	Nominated	
Premios Tu Música Urbano	2020	"Mia" (with Drake)	Collaboration of the Year New Generation	Nominated	
Premios Tu Música Urbano	2020	Oasis (with J Balvin)	Male Album of The Year	Won	
Premios Tu Música Urbano	2020	X 100pre	Concert of the Year	Nominated	
Premios Tu Música Urbano	2020	X 100Pre Tour	World Tour	Nominated	
Premios Tu Música Urbano	2022	Bad Bunny	Artist of the Year	Nominated	
Premios Tu Música Urbano	2022	Bad Bunny	Top Social Artist	Nominated	
Premios Tu Música Urbano	2022	Bad Bunny	Composer of the Year	Won	
Premios Tu Música Urbano	2022	"Yonaguni"	Song of the Year	Nominated	
Premios Tu Música Urbano	2022	"Yonaguni"	Video of the Year	Nominated	
Premios Tu Música Urbano	2022	"AM (Remix)" (with Nio Garcia and J Balvin)	Remix of the Year	Nominated	
Premios Tu Música Urbano	2022	"Volando Remix" (with Mora and Sech)	Remix of the Year	Nominated	
Premios Tu Música Urbano	2022	"Volví" (with Aventura)	Collaboration of the Year	Nominated	
Premios Tu Música Urbano	2022	"Lo siento BB" (with Tainy and Julieta Venegas)	Collaboration of the Year	Nominated	
Premios Tu Música Urbano	2022	"X Última Vez" (with Daddy Yankee)	Top Song — Pop Urban	Won	
Premios Tu Música Urbano	2022	"100 Millones" (with Luar La L)	Top Song — Trap	Nominated	
Premios Tu Música Urbano	2023	Himself	Artist of the Year	Nominated	
Premios Tu Música Urbano	2023	"Me Porto Bonito" (with Chencho Corleone)	Song of the Year	Nominated	
Premios Tu Música Urbano	2023	"La Jumpa" (with Árcangel)	Collaboration of the Year	Nominated	
Premios Tu Música Urbano	2023	"La Corriente" (with Tony Dize)	Collaboration of the Year	Nominated	
Premios Tu Música Urbano	2023	"Party" (with Rauw Alejandro)	Collaboration of the Year	Nominated	
Premios Tu Música Urbano	2023	"Ojitos Lindos" (with Bomba Estereo)	Top Song – Pop Urban	Nominated	
Premios Tu Música Urbano	2023	"Coco Chanel" (with Eladio Carrión)	Top Song – Trap	Nominated	
Premios Tu Música Urbano	2023	"Tití Me Preguntó"	Top Song – Dembow	Nominated	
Premios Tu Música Urbano	2023	World's Hottest Tour	Concert/Tour of the Year	Nominated	
Premios Tu Música Urbano	2023	Un Verano Sin Ti	Album of the Year – Male Artist	Nominated	
Premios Tu Música Urbano	2025	Bad Bunny	Artist of the Year	Won	
Premios Tu Música Urbano	2025	"DtMF"	Song of the Year	Won	
Premios Tu Música Urbano	2025	Debí Tirar Más Fotos	Album of the Year – Male Artist	Nominated	
Premios Tu Música Urbano	2025	"Qué Pasaría..." (with Rauw Alejandro)	Collaboration of the Year	Nominated	
Premios Tu Música Urbano	2025	"Adivino" (with Myke Towers)	Collaboration of the Year	Nominated	
Premios Tu Música Urbano	2025	"Baile Inolvidable"	Top Song – Tropical	Nominated	
Premios Tu Música Urbano	2025	"Nuevayol"	Top Song – Dembow	Nominated	
Premios Tu Música Urbano	2025	"Weltita" (with Chuwi)	Top Song – Indie	Nominated	
Premios Tu Música Urbano	2026	Bad Bunny	Male Artist of the Year	Won	
Purecharts Awards	2024	Bad Bunny	International Male Artist of the Year	Nominated	
Rolling Stone en Español Awards	2023	Bad Bunny	Artist of the Year	Nominated	
Rolling Stone en Español Awards	2023	"La Jumpa" (with Arcángel)	Song of the Year	Nominated	
Rolling Stone en Español Awards	2023	"Tití Me Preguntó"	Song of the Year	Nominated	
Rolling Stone en Español Awards	2023	"Ojitos Lindos" (with Bomba Estéreo)	Music Video of the Year	Nominated	
Rolling Stone en Español Awards	2023	"Where She Goes"	Music Video of the Year	Nominated	
Rolling Stone en Español Awards	2023	Un Verano Sin Ti	Album of the Year	Nominated	
Shorty Awards	2019	Bad Bunny	Best in Music	Nominated	
Spotify Awards	2020	Bad Bunny	Spotify Artist of the Year	Won	
Spotify Awards	2020	Bad Bunny	Most-Streamed Male Artist:	Won	
Spotify Awards	2020	Bad Bunny	Most-Added to Playlists Artist	Won	
Spotify Awards	2020	Bad Bunny	Most Streamed Artist on Consoles	Won	
Spotify Awards	2020	Bad Bunny	Most Streamed Male Artist By Users From 13 to 17 Years Old	Won	
Spotify Awards	2020	Bad Bunny	Most Streamed Male Artist By Users From 18 to 29 Years Old	Won	
Spotify Awards	2020	Bad Bunny	Most Streamed Male Artist By Users From 30 to 44 Years Old	Nominated	
Spotify Awards	2020	Bad Bunny	Most Followed Artist	Nominated	
Spotify Awards	2020	Bad Bunny	Composer of Most Streamed Song	Nominated	
Spotify Awards	2020	"Callaíta" (with Tainy)	Most Streamed Song	Won	
Spotify Awards	2020	"Callaíta" (with Tainy)	Summer Song	Nominated	
Spotify Awards	2020	"La Canción" (with J Balvin)	Summer Song	Nominated	
Swiss Music Awards	2026	Bad Bunny	Best International Solo Act	Nominated	
Teen Choice Awards	2019	Bad Bunny	Choice Latin Artist	Nominated	
Teen Choice Awards	2019	"Mia" (with Drake)	Choice Latin Song	Nominated	
Ticketmaster Awards	2026	Debí Tirar Más Fotos World Tour	Most Anticipated Live Act - Germany	Nominated	
Ticketmaster Awards	2026	Debí Tirar Más Fotos World Tour	Most Anticipated Live Act - Italy	Nominated	
UK Music Video Awards	2025	"Nuevayol"	Best Dance / Electronic Video – International	Nominated	
UK Music Video Awards	2025	"Nuevayol"	Best Colour Grading in a Video	Nominated	
Urban Music Awards	2018	Bad Bunny	Artist of the Year (South America)	Nominated	
Urban Music Awards	2020	Bad Bunny	Artist of the Year (South America)	Won	
Urban Music Awards	2021	Bad Bunny	Artist of the Year (South America)	Nominated	
Urban Music Awards	2023	Bad Bunny	Artist of the Year (South America)	Won	
Variety	2020	Bad Bunny	Achievement in International Music	Won	
Wowie Awards	2023	Bad Bunny	Best Dressed	Nominated	
WWE	2021	Bad Bunny	WWE 24/7 Championship	Won	
Money	2022	Bad Bunny	2023 Money Changemaker	Won	

== Other accolades ==
=== Listicles ===
Publisher	Listicle	Year(s)	Result	Ref.
Apple Music	100 Best Albums	2024	76th (Un Verano Sin Ti)	
Billboard	The 100 Greatest Music Video Artists of All Time	2020	49th	
Billboard	The Best 50 Albums of 2025	2025	1st (Debí Tirar Más Fotos)	
Billboard	The Best 100 Songs of 2025	2025	15th ("DTMF"); 3rd ("Nuevayol")	
Billboard	Greatest Pop Star By Year			
Billboard	Greatest Pop Star By Year	2021	10th	
Billboard	Greatest Pop Star By Year	2022	1st	
Billboard	Greatest Pop Star By Year	2023	8th	
Billboard	Greatest Pop Star By Year	2025	1st	
Billboard	Greatest Pop Stars of the 21st Century	2024	23rd	

=== Guinness World Records ===
Year	Record	Record holder	Ref.
2020	Most weeks at No. 1 on Billboard Top Latin Albums chart (male)	X 100pre	
2020	First all-Spanish-language album to reach No. 1 on Billboard 200 chart	El Último Tour del Mundo	
2021	Most Lo Nuestro Awards won in a single year by a main-credited artist	List: • Artist of the Year • Album of the Year (YHLQMDLG) • Male Urban Artist of the Year • Urban Song of the Year ("La Difícil") • Urban Album of the Year (YHLQMDLG) • Urban/Trap Song of the Year ("Vete") • Crossover Collaboration of the Year "(Un Día (One Day))"	
2022	First winner of the Best Música Urbana Album at the Grammy Awards	El Último Tour del Mundo	
2022	First male Latin artist to win Artist of the Year at the MTV Video Music Awards	Bad Bunny	
2022	Most nominations for an artist in a single year at the Billboard Latin Music Awards	List: • Artist of the Year • Tour of the Year • Hot Latin Song of the Year ("Me Porto Bonito", "Tití Me Preguntó", and "Yonaguni") • Hot Latin Song of the Year, Vocal Event ("Volví", "Ojitos Lindos", "Me Porto Bonito", and "Party") • Hot Latin Songs Artist of the Year, Male • Airplay Song of the Year ("Volví") • Top Latin Album of the Year "(Un Verano Sin Ti)" • Top Latin Albums Artist of the Year, Male • Tropical Song of the Year ("Volví") • Latin Rhythm Artist of the Year, Solo • Latin Rhythm Artist of the Year, Solo • Latin Rhythm Song of the Year ("Me Porto Bonito", "Volví", and "Yonaguni") • Latin Rhythm Album of the Year (Un Verano Sin Ti) • Songwriter of the Year	
2022	First Album of the Year nomination for a Spanish-language album at the Grammy Awards	Un Verano Sin Ti	
2023	Most consecutive Artist of the Year awards won at the Billboard Latin Music Awards	Bad Bunny	
2023	Most Top Latin Album of the Year awards won at the Billboard Latin Music Awards	Bad Bunny	
2023	Most streamed album on Spotify	Un Verano Sin Ti	
2024	Most streamed album on Spotify	Un Verano Sin Ti	
2025	Most streamed act on Spotify	Bad Bunny	

=== State and cultural honors ===
Country (state)	Year	Honor	Ref.
United States (California)	2026	Bad Bunny Day, February 8	
