= Billboard Music Award for Top Latin Female Artist =

Annual American music award

- Country: United States
- Presented by: Billboard
- First award: 2021
- Currently held by: Karol G (2024)

Highlights
- Most wins: Karol G (3)
- Most nominations: Karol G (4)
- Website: billboardmusicawards.com

The following list shows the winners and nominees for the Billboard Music Award for Top Latin Female Artist. First given in 2021, Karol G was the first winner and has won this award three times.

== Winners and nominees ==
Winners are listed first and highlighted in bold.

Year	Artist	Ref.
2021	**Karol G**	
2021	Becky G	
2021	Rosalía	
2022	**Kali Uchis**	
2022	Karol G	
2022	Rosalía	
2023	**Karol G**	
2023	Shakira	
2023	Rosalía	
2024	**Karol G**	
2024	Kali Uchis	
2024	Shakira	

== Artists with multiple wins ==
3 wins

- Karol G

== Artists with multiple nominations ==
4 nominations

- Karol G

3 nominations

- Rosalía

2 nominations

- Kali Uchis
- Shakira

== See also ==
- Billboard Music Award for Top Latin Artist
- Billboard Latin Music Award for Hot Latin Songs Artist of the Year
