= MTV Europe Music Award for Best Latin =

Music award

- Country: Europe
- Presented by: MTV
- First award: 2020
- Currently held by: Peso Pluma (2024)
- Website: ema.mtv.tv/

The MTV Europe Music Award for Best Latin has been awarded since 2020. During the 2010s, the award show implemented the first Latin categories since the ceremony of 2013, including regional categories and the Best Latin American Act (continental category) being the predecessor of Best Latin.

It's one of the current Latin categories of the ceremony along with Best Caribbean, Latin America North, South and Central Act. Best Latin category is also the only one that rewards artist(s) of Latin music as a musical genre, and not as a nationality.

== Winners and nominees ==
Winners are listed first and highlighted in bold.

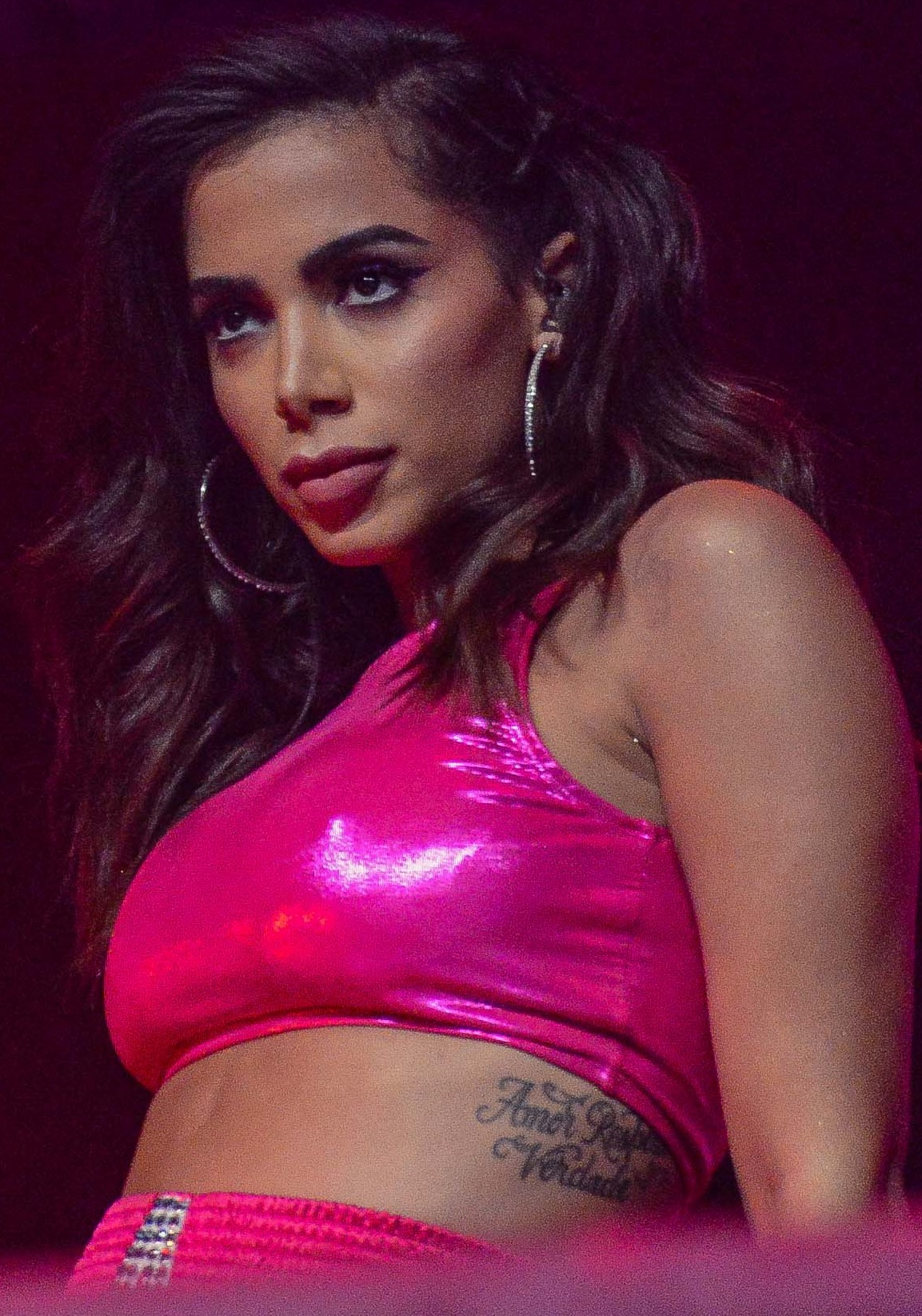
Anitta is the artist with the most awards won in this category.

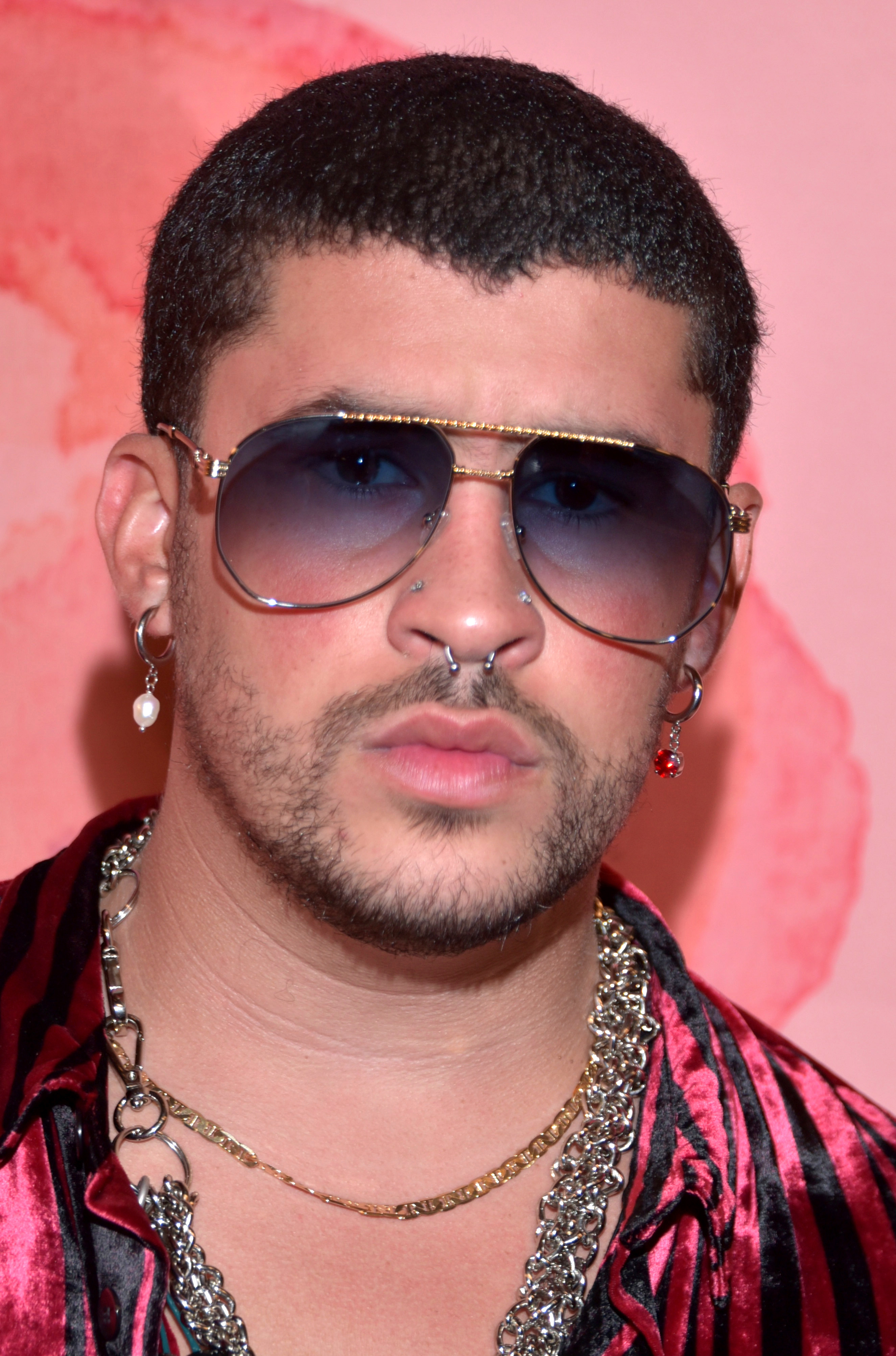
Bad Bunny is the most nominated artist in this category.

† indicates an MTV Video Music Award for Best Latin–winning artist.

=== 2020s ===
Year	Artist	Ref.
2020	**Karol G**	
2020	Anuel AA	
2020	Bad Bunny	
2020	J Balvin	
2020	Maluma	
2020	Ozuna	
2021	**Maluma** †	
2021	Bad Bunny	
2021	J Balvin	
2021	Rauw Alejandro	
2021	Rosalía	
2021	Shakira	
2022	**Anitta** †	
2022	Bad Bunny	
2022	J Balvin	
2022	Becky G	
2022	Rosalía	
2022	Shakira	
2023	**Anitta** †	
2023	Bad Bunny	
2023	Karol G	
2023	Peso Pluma	
2023	Rosalía	
2023	Shakira	
2024	**Peso Pluma**	
2024	Anitta †	
2024	Bad Bunny	
2024	Karol G	
2024	Rauw Alejandro	
2024	Shakira	

== See also ==
- MTV Video Music Award for Best Latin
- MTV Europe Music Award for Best Caribbean Act
- MTV Europe Music Award for Best Latin America North Act
- MTV Europe Music Award for Best Latin America South Act
- MTV Europe Music Award for Best Latin America Central Act
