= Un Verano en Nueva York =

Song by El Gran Combo de Puerto Rico

from the album 7
- Language: Spanish
- Released: 1975
- Genre: Salsa
- Length: 4:32
- Label: EGC Records
- Composer: Justi Barreto

"Un Verano en Nueva York" (English: "A Summer in New York") is a popular salsa composition written by Cuban songwriter Justi Barreto and popularized by the ensemble El Gran Combo de Puerto Rico. Originally released in 1975, the song has become a genre standard and a cultural anthem for both New York City and the Puerto Rican diaspora.

== History and composition ==
The song was composed by Justi Barreto, a renowned Cuban percussionist and songwriter known for his extensive contributions to the New York Latin music scene. It was featured on the album 7 (also known as Numbers 7) by El Gran Combo, released under the EGC Records label.

The lyrics describe the experience of visiting New York City during the summer season, highlighting the contrast between the intense heat and the vibrant social life of Latino neighborhoods. Unlike other musical chronicles of the era that focused on the hardships of the ghetto, Barreto's composition offers a festive and optimistic vision of Nuyorican identity.

== Musical analysis ==
- Genre: salsa (Salsa dura).
- Arrangement: the original version is noted for its powerful brass section and rhythmic piano montuno.
- Performance: the original lead vocals belong to Andy Montañez. His performance is considered one of the most iconic of his career before he left the group to join Dimensión Latina.

== Cultural impact and legacy ==
In 2023, the song experienced a global resurgence due to advertising campaigns and extensive use on digital platforms such as TikTok and Instagram, reaffirming its relevance for new generations.

In 2025, the song was featured as a prominent sample in Bad Bunny's track NUEVAYoL, which peaked at number one on the Billboard Hot Latin Songs chart.

== Credits (Original version) ==
Role	Name
Composer	Justi Barreto
Lead vocals	Andy Montañez
Ensemble	El Gran Combo de Puerto Rico
Director	Rafael Ithier
Album	7 (1975)
