= X 100pre Tour =

2019 concert tour by Bad Bunny

X100pre Tour
- Transcontinental tour by Bad Bunny
- Promotional poster for the second North American leg of the tour
- Location: North America; South America; Europe
- Associated album: X 100pre
- Start date: March 8, 2019
- End date: December 8, 2019
- Legs: 6
- No. of shows: 67

Bad Bunny concert chronology
- La Nueva Religion Tour (2018); X 100pre Tour (2019); El Último Tour del Mundo (2022)

The X 100pre Tour was the second concert tour of the Puerto Rican rapper Bad Bunny, in support of his studio album X 100pre. It toured North America, Latin America and Europe in six legs and 61 dates, beginning in San Juan on March 8, 2019, and ending in Tampa on December 8, 2019. A box office success, the tour was named among the most lucrative according to Pollstar, ranked at number 16 on the list. It received positive reviews from critics due to its production and creativity.

== Background ==
The first dates were announced by the singer on his Facebook account on December 18, 2018, in which he presented 14 dates spread across the United States and three performances in the Puerto Rican capital, of which a second date was later added in Miami. On January 21, 2019, three dates in Colombia were announced by Colboletos, specifically in Bogotá, Cali and Medellín. The singer's participation in the French version of Lollapalooza was confirmed on January 24, 2019. It was then announced on March 2, 2019, through the Chilean event organizer Bizarro Live Entertainment, that a unique concert would be staged in Santiago de Chile on September 6 of the same year. On April 9, 2019, he announced the second North American part of the tour, including 17 dates only in the United States; this part of the tour would be sponsored by Corona Estéreo Beach of Corona Extra. Then on April 11, 2019, a talent contest was announced for concerts in Colombia, where the three winners would be Bad Bunny's opening acts, or opening acts for his time on Colombian soil. On April 30, 2019, the European leg of the tour was announced, beginning on July 4 of the same year. On May 24, the expansion of the tour to the Barclays Center venue was announced. On May 28, 2019, his concert tour through Colombia was cancelled, leaving the country without any of the three previously agreed dates. On July 25, 2019, a second date was announced in the Chilean capital, which was agreed for September 4 of the same year. On August 8, 2019, a single date was announced in the Mexican city of Monterrey, and two weeks later there was promised an extension of the Mexican tour through Mexico City, San Luis Potosí and Tampico.

== Special guests ==
- J Balvin on March 8 in P FKN R San Juan
- Wisin y Yandel on March 8 in San Juan
- Becky G on March 8 in San Juan and April 22 in Los Angeles
- Arcángel on March 10 in San Juan and June 15 in Santo Domingo
- Lunay on June 15 in Santo Domingo
- El Alfa El Jefe on March 10 in San Juan and June 15 in Santo Domingo
- Jhay Cortez and Andrezz on September 7 in Santiago
- Cazzu on October 17 in Mexico City

== Tour dates ==
Date	City	Country	Venue	Attendance	Revenue
Leg 1 – North America
March 8, 2019	San Juan	Puerto Rico	José Miguel Agrelot Coliseum	48,080 / 48,080	$3,729,143
March 9, 2019	San Juan	Puerto Rico	José Miguel Agrelot Coliseum	48,080 / 48,080	$3,729,143
March 10, 2019	San Juan	Puerto Rico	José Miguel Agrelot Coliseum	48,080 / 48,080	$3,729,143
March 14, 2019	Miami	United States	American Airlines Arena	18,315 / 18,315	$1,953,842
March 16, 2019	Miami	United States	American Airlines Arena	18,315 / 18,315	$1,953,842
March 21, 2019	Portland	United States	Moda Center	—	—
March 22, 2019	Tacoma	United States	Tacoma Dome	—	—
March 24, 2019	Rosemont	United States	Allstate Arena	16,853 / 17,170	$1,735,653
March 28, 2019	Cedar Park	United States	H-E-B Center at Cedar Park	—	—
March 29, 2019	Hidalgo	United States	State Farm Hidalgo Arena	—	—
March 30, 2019	Midland	United States	La Hacienda Event Center	—	—
March 31, 2019	El Paso	United States	Don Haskins Center	—	—
April 4, 2019	Dallas	United States	American Airlines Center	16,484 / 16,484	$1,457,679
April 5, 2019	Laredo	United States	Sames Auto Arena	—	—
April 7, 2019	Uncasville	United States	Mohegan Sun Arena	—	—
April 9, 2019	Orlando	United States	Amway Center	16,247 / 16,247	$1,579,955
April 12, 2019	Estero	United States	Hertz Arena	7,626 / 7,626	$709,277
April 14, 2019 (Note: These concerts were part of Coachella Festival.)	Indio	United States	Empire Polo Club	—N/a	—N/a
April 20, 2019	San Jose	United States	SAP Center	17,116 / 17,767	$1,640,810
April 21, 2019	Indio	United States	Empire Polo Club	—N/a	—N/a
April 22, 2019	Los Angeles	United States	Staples Center	16,787 / 16,787	$1,912,592
April 27, 2019	New York City	United States	Madison Square Garden	18,656 / 18,656	$2,114,421
April 28, 2019	Reading	United States	Santander Arena	8,656 / 8,656	$762,264
Leg 2 – Central America
June 14, 2019	Panamá City	Panama	Plaza Amador	6,400 / 6,400	$658,039
June 15, 2019	Santo Domingo	Dominican Republic	Estadio Quisqueya	30,288 / 30,288	$1,130,679
Leg 3 – Europe
July 3, 2019 (Note: This concert was a part of Smash Fest.)	Stockholm	Sweden	Stockholm Olympic Stadium	—N/a	—N/a
July 4, 2019 (Note: This concert was a part of Festival Río Babel.)	Madrid	Spain	Feria de Madrid	—N/a	—N/a
July 5, 2019 (Note: This concert was a part of Latin Fest.)	Valencia	Spain	Plaza de Toros de Valencia	—N/a	—N/a
July 6, 2019 (Note: This concert was a part of Pal Mundo Festival.)	Amsterdam	Netherlands	Arena Park	—N/a	—N/a
July 7, 2019 (Note: This concert was a part of Ruisrock.)	Turku	Finland	National Park of Ruissalo	—N/a	—N/a
July 10, 2019 (Note: This concert was a part of Milano Latin Festival.)	Milan	Italy	ATM Park Milanofiori	—N/a	—N/a
July 11, 2019 (Note: This concert was a part of Rock in Roma.)	Rome	Italy	Ippodromo delle Capannelle	—N/a	—N/a
July 13, 2019	Mannheim	Germany	SAP Arena	—	—
July 14, 2019	Ibiza	Spain	Ushuaïa Club	—	—
July 18, 2019 (Note: These concerts were part of Canarias Baila Festival.)	Gran Canaria	Spain	Estadio de Gran Canaria	—N/a	—N/a
July 19, 2019	Tenerife	Spain	Hoyo 1 Amarilla Golf	—N/a	—N/a
July 20, 2019 (Note: This concert was a part of Sónar.)	Barcelona	Spain	Fira Gran Via	—N/a	—N/a
July 21, 2019 (Note: This concert was a part of Lollapalooza Paris.)	París	France	Longchamp Racecourse	—N/a	—N/a
Leg 4 – North America
August 8, 2019	Dallas	United States	Dos Equis Pavilion	—	—
August 10, 2019	Brampton	Canada	CAA Centre	—	—
August 16, 2019	Guatemala City	Guatemala	Explanada Cardales de Cayala	15,436 / 15,436	$1,271,866
August 17, 2019	Rosarito	Mexico	Rosarito Beach	—	—
August 30, 2019	Miami	United States	American Airlines Arena	—	—
Leg 5 – Latin America
September 4, 2019	Santiago	Chile	Movistar Arena	28,931 / 32,134	$1,358,530
September 6, 2019	Santiago	Chile	Movistar Arena	28,931 / 32,134	$1,358,530
October 12, 2019	Monterrey	Mexico	Arena Monterrey	15,882 / 15,882	$807,949
October 17, 2019	Ciudad de México	Mexico	Arena Ciudad de México	25,172 / 25,172	$825,557
October 18, 2019	San Luis Potosí	Mexico	El Domo	—	—
October 19, 2019	Tampico	Mexico	Expotampico	—	—
October 20, 2019	Tijuana	Mexico	Plaza Monumental	—	—
Leg 6 – North America
October 25, 2019	Boston	United States	Agganis Arena	6,661 / 6,661	$727,731
October 26, 2019	Bridgeport	United States	Webster Bank Arena	7,580 / 9,358	$600,511
October 27, 2019	Newark	United States	Prudential Center	13,078 / 13,078	$1,258,662
November 1, 2019	Fairfax	United States	EagleBank Arena	9,980 / 9,980	$963,260
November 2, 2019	Greensboro	United States	Greensboro Coliseum Complex	8,648 / 8,648	$761,482
November 3, 2019	Atlanta	United States	State Farm Arena	11,155 / 11,155	$1,002,135
November 8, 2019	Garland	United States	Curtis Culwell Center	7,065 / 8,120	$628,310
November 9, 2019	San Antonio	United States	Freeman Coliseum	10,108 / 10,108	$999,101
November 10, 2019	Tulsa	United States	BOK Center	7,131 / 7,778	$690,601
November 15, 2019	Phoenix	United States	Talking Stick Resort Arena	14,365 / 14,365	$1,191,574
November 16, 2019	Las Vegas	United States	Mandalay Bay Events Center	8,841 / 8,841	$808,803
November 17, 2019	Inglewood	United States	The Forum	16,564 / 16,564	$1,930,160
November 18, 2019	San Diego	United States	Pechanga Arena	13,414 / 13,414	$1,071,480
November 23, 2019	Ontario	United States	Citizens Business Bank Arena	10,154 / 10,154	$1,158,555
November 24, 2019	San Francisco	United States	Chase Center	16,387 / 16,387	$1,499,232
November 27, 2019	Tucson	United States	Tucson Convention Center	7,167 / 7,167	$636,749
November 29, 2019	Rosemont	United States	Allstate Arena	17,299 / 17,299	$1,710,269
December 1, 2019	Houston	United States	Toyota Center	15,790 / 15,790	$1,554,002
December 6, 2019	Brooklyn	United States	Barclays Center	16,460 / 16,460	$1,693,862
December 8, 2019	Tampa	United States	Amalie Arena	12,453 / 12,453	$1,000,837
Total				-	-
