= Bellacoso =

2019 song by Residente and Bad Bunny

Single by Residente and Bad Bunny
- Language: Spanish
- English title: "Horny"
- Released: July 26, 2019
- Genre: Reggaeton
- Length: 4:17
- Label: Sony Music Latin
- Songwriters: René Pérez Joglar; Benito Ocasio; Trooko; Jesús Molina; José Carlos Cruz; Luis Romero; Urbani Mota
- Producers: René Pérez Joglar; Trooko

Residente singles chronology
"Querido Louis" (2019)	"Bellacoso" (2019)	"Pecador" (2019)

Bad Bunny singles chronology
"La Canción" (2019)	"Bellacoso" (2019)	"Kemba Walker" (2019)

Music video
- "Bellacoso" on YouTube

"Bellacoso" (transl. "Horny") is a single by Puerto Rican rappers Residente and Bad Bunny released on July 25, 2019, which will be included in Residente's upcoming second studio album by Sony Music Latin.

It peaked at number 35 in the Argentina Hot 100 chart, 24 in the US Hot Latin Songs and 61 in Spain.

== Background and development ==
In the context of the Puerto Rican protests, on July 15, Residente stated he would create a perreo song if the then Governor of Puerto Rico Ricardo Rosselló resigns. On July 24, Rosselló made public his resignation, and the next day Residente gave hints of the release of the promised song, which was released as a single on July 26 with the title "Bellacoso".

Residente stated that the song was inspired by an electroencephalogram test on Bad Bunny's brain: "The brain frequencies, you change them into numbers, [...] then you can change those numbers into sounds, rhythms and patterns."

== Music and lyrics ==
Musically, "Bellacoso" is a reggaeton song, written by René Pérez Joglar, Benito Ocasio, Trooko, Jesús Molina, José Carlos Cruz, Luis Romero and Urbani Mota. Its production was handled by Residente and Trooko. The song runs 4 minutes and 17 seconds.

The drum sample was inspired by Daddy Yankee sound and it was provided by DJ Urba, who worked with Yankee previously. This is the second reggaeton song recorded by Residente, the first being 2005 Calle 13's song "Atrévete-te-te". "Bellacoso" contains two samples: Otomania's cover of the Finnish song Ievan Polkka, featuring Hatsune Miku, and "Te Ves Buena" (1990) by El General.

The title of the song, bellacoso, is a Puerto Rican slang term for someone who is very sexually aroused. The song's lyrics were influenced by feminist groups that participated in the Puerto Rican protests and seek to speak in public about consent and the fight against harassment. As Residente said to Rolling Stone in an interview: "It’s about being horny without harassment — it’s consensual. If everybody wants to go all the way, whether you’re a twosome, threesome, or foursome, everybody has to consent."

== Music video ==
The music video was directed by Gregory Ohrel and it was recorded in San Juan, Puerto Rico. The clip features dancers performing in several beaches and in the streets of San Juan, with Residente and Bad Bunny singing around them. It also shows a cameo of Elías de León from White Lion Records, who Residente has worked previously with. The clip has received more than 180 million views on YouTube, as of July 2021.

== Personnel ==
Credits adapted from Tidal.

Vocals

- Residente – lead vocals
- Bad Bunny – lead vocals

Musicians

- Trooko – synthesizer

Production

- Residente – production
- Trooko – production, programming
- Tom Elmhirst – mixing
- Phil Joly – recording
- Ted Jensen – mastering
- Oriana Hidalgo – A&R coordination
- Rafa Arcaute – A&R direction

== Charts ==
Chart (2019)	Peak position
Argentina Hot 100 (Billboard)	35
Spain (Promusicae)	61
US Hot Latin Songs (Billboard)	24

== Certifications ==
Region	Certification	Certified units/sales
Mexico (AMPROFON)	4× Platinum	240,000^{‡}
^{‡} Sales+streaming figures based on certification alone.
