= Billboard Music Award for Top Latin Male Artist =

Annual American music award

- Country: United States
- Presented by: Billboard
- First award: 2021
- Currently held by: Bad Bunny (2024)

Highlights
- Most wins: Bad Bunny (4)
- Most nominations: Bad Bunny (4)
- Website: billboardmusicawards.com

The following list shows the winners and nominees for the Billboard Music Award for Top Latin Male Artist. First given in 2021, Bad Bunny was the first winner and has won this award four times.

== Winners and nominees ==
Winners are listed first and highlighted in bold.

Year	Artist	Ref.
2021	**Bad Bunny**	
2021	J Balvin	
2021	Ozuna	
2022	**Bad Bunny**	
2022	Farruko	
2022	Rauw Alejandro	
2023	**Bad Bunny**	
2023	Peso Pluma	
2023	Rauw Alejandro	
2024	**Bad Bunny**	
2024	Peso Pluma	
2024	Junior H	

== Artists with multiple wins ==
4 wins

- Bad Bunny

== Artists with multiple nominations ==
4 nominations

- Bad Bunny

2 nominations

- Peso Pluma
- Rauw Alejandro

== See also ==
- Billboard Music Award for Top Latin Artist
- Billboard Latin Music Award for Hot Latin Songs Artist of the Year
