= Nuevayol =

Song by Bad Bunny

from the album Debí Tirar Más Fotos
- Language: Spanish
- English title: "New York"
- Released: January 5, 2025
- Recorded: 2024
- Genre: Dembow
- Length: 3:05
- Label: Rimas
- Songwriters: Benito Antonio Martínez Ocasio; Marco Borrero
- Producers: MAG; La Paciencia; Justi Barreto

Music video
- "Nuevayol" on YouTube

"Nuevayol" (stylized as "NUEVAYoL") is a song by Puerto Rican rapper Bad Bunny. It was released on January 5, 2025, as the opening track of his sixth solo studio album Debí Tirar Más Fotos.

The title is an affectionate phoneticization by some Puerto Rican Spanish speakers of Nueva York, the Spanish name for New York.

== Background and release ==
On January 3, 2025, when the track listing for Debí Tirar Más Fotos was revealed, the song "Nuevayol" was revealed and included as the first track that kicks off the album.

== Music and lyrics ==
Musically, "Nuevayol" is a dembow song that makes its rhythm carry the spirit of "Tití Me Preguntó". Also, at the beginning of the song, it begins with the sample of "Un Verano en Nueva York" by Andy Montañez and El Gran Combo de Puerto Rico. Lyrically, "Nuevayol" reflects the rapper's vision of the struggle for Puerto Rican identity. Through his lyrics, he expresses his discontent with the modernization that threatens the authenticity of his homeland.

== Visualizer ==
The variant of the Puerto Rican flag used between 1895 and 1952, shown in the visualizer

An audio visualizer was released along with the rest of the album's other songs simultaneously on January 5, 2025. The visualizer tells the story of the Puerto Rican flag in three slides.

== Music video ==
The music video was released on July 4, 2025, also to coincide with the United States' Independence Day. The video begins with Bad Bunny walking through the snow and, as he gets into a car, he asks himself, "¿Y este frío cuándo se acaba, diablo?" ("When will this cold end? damn!"). From there, the rest of the video focuses on a quinceañera celebration, complete with food, dancing, and black-and-white images of the Puerto Rican diaspora in New York. Then, near the end of the video, several young people are seen listening to a radio station playing a message that simulates Donald Trump, repenting of his policies and apologizing to immigrants in America.

== Live performances ==
Bad Bunny performed the song at his Super Bowl halftime show on February 8, 2026.

== Charts ==
=== Weekly charts ===
Weekly chart performance for "Nuevayol"
Chart (2025–2026)	Peak position
Argentina Hot 100 (Billboard)	9
Argentina (CAPIF)	8
Australia (ARIA)	25
Austria (Ö3 Austria Top 40)	4
Belgium (Ultratop 50 Wallonia)	24
Bolivia (Billboard)	3
Bolivia (Monitor Latino)	12
Brazil Hot 100 (Billboard)	35
Canada Hot 100 (Billboard)	3
Canada CHR/Top 40 (Billboard)	39
Central America (Monitor Latino)	4
Central America + Caribbean (FONOTICA)	7
Chile (Billboard)	5
Chile Airplay (Monitor Latino)	11
Colombia (Billboard)	3
Colombia (Monitor Latino)	15
Costa Rica (Monitor Latino)	5
Costa Rica (FONOTICA)	3
Croatia (Billboard)	14
Czech Republic Singles Digital (ČNS IFPI)	29
Denmark (Tracklisten)	12
Dominican Republic (Monitor Latino)	1
Ecuador (Billboard)	3
Ecuador (Monitor Latino)	1
El Salvador (Monitor Latino)	1
El Salvador (ASAP EGC)	2
Finland (Suomen virallinen lista)	43
France (SNEP)	5
Germany (GfK)	7
Global 200 (Billboard)	3
Greece International (IFPI)	1
Guatemala (Monitor Latino)	9
Honduras (Monitor Latino)	3
Hungary (Dance Top 40)	12
Hungary (Single Top 40)	12
Iceland (Billboard)	4
Ireland (IRMA)	11
Israel (Mako Hitlist)	19
Italy (FIMI)	3
Japan Hot Overseas (Billboard Japan)	19
Latin America Latino Airplay (Monitor Latino)	6
Latvia Streaming (LaIPA)	6
Lithuania (AGATA)	2
Luxembourg (Billboard)	2
Mexico (Billboard)	9
Middle East and North Africa (IFPI)	11
Netherlands (Single Top 100)	12
New Zealand (Recorded Music NZ)	30
Nicaragua (Monitor Latino)	2
North Africa (IFPI)	12
Norway (IFPI Norge)	33
Panama International (PRODUCE)	8
Panama Urbano Airplay (Monitor Latino)	1
Paraguay (Monitor Latino)	3
Peru (Billboard)	2
Peru (Monitor Latino)	1
Poland (Polish Streaming Top 100)	28
Portugal (AFP)	2
Romania (Billboard)	1
Romania Airplay (UPFR)	7
Romania Airplay (Media Forest)	16
San Marino Airplay (SMRTV Top 50)	39
Slovakia Singles Digital (ČNS IFPI)	4
Spain (PROMUSICAE)	1
Suriname (Nationale Top 40)	32
Sweden (Sverigetopplistan)	15
Switzerland (Schweizer Hitparade)	2
Turkey International Airplay (Radiomonitor Türkiye)	7
United Arab Emirates (IFPI)	8
UK Singles (Official Charts)	15
UK Indie (Official Charts)	4
US Billboard Hot 100	5
US Hot Latin Rhythm Songs (Billboard)	2
US Hot Latin Songs (Billboard)	1
Venezuela Airplay (Monitor Latino)	1

=== Monthly charts ===
Monthly chart performance for "Nuevayol"
Chart (2025–2026)	Peak position
Paraguay Airplay (SGP)	34
Romania Airplay (TopHit)	34
Uruguay Streaming (CUD)	13

=== Year-end charts ===
Year-end chart performance for "Nuevayol"
Chart (2025)	Position
Belgium (Ultratop 50 Wallonia)	105
Bolivia Airplay (Monitor Latino)	90
Central America Airplay (Monitor Latino)	11
Chile Airplay (Monitor Latino)	20
El Salvador Airplay (ASAP EGC)	6
France (SNEP)	53
Global 200 (Billboard)	38
Italy (FIMI)	22
Switzerland (Schweizer Hitparade)	14
US Billboard Hot 100	89
US Hot Latin Songs (Billboard)	3

== Certifications ==
Certifications and sales for "Nuevayol"
Region	Certification	Certified units/sales
Belgium (BRMA)	Gold	20,000^{‡}
Denmark (IFPI Danmark)	Gold	45,000^{‡}
France (SNEP)	Diamond	333,333^{‡}
Italy (FIMI)	2× Platinum	400,000^{‡}
New Zealand (RMNZ)	Gold	15,000^{‡}
Poland (ZPAV)	Gold	62,500^{‡}
Portugal (AFP)	5× Platinum	125,000^{‡}
Spain (Promusicae)	6× Platinum	600,000^{‡}
United Kingdom (BPI)	Silver	200,000^{‡}
Streaming
Greece (IFPI Greece)	3× Platinum	6,000,000^{†}
^{‡} Sales+streaming figures based on certification alone.^{†} Streaming-only figures based on certification alone.
