= Billboard Latin Music Award for Hot Latin Songs Artist of the Year =

Annual American music award

- Current: 2025 Billboard Latin Music Awards
- Awarded for: the best performing latin artists in Billboard magazine
- Country: United States
- Presented by: Billboard
- First award: 1994
- Final award: 2025
- Currently held by: Bad Bunny (male); Karol G (female); Fuerza Regida (group)

Highlights
- Most awards: Bad Bunny (4) (male); Shakira (7) (female); Banda MS (4) (group)
- Most nominations: Enrique Iglesias (10) (male); Shakira (11) (female); Banda MS (8) (group)
- Website: billboardevents.com

The Billboard Latin Music Award for Hot Latin Songs Artist of the Year (formerly Hot Latin Tracks Artist of the Year) is an honor presented annually at the Billboard Latin Music Awards, a ceremony which honors "the most popular albums, songs, and performers in Latin music, as determined by the actual sales, radio airplay, streaming and social data that informs Billboard's weekly charts." The award is given to best performing artists on Billboard's Hot Latin Songs chart, which measures the most popular Latin songs in the United States. The Hot Latin Songs chart was based solely on radio airplay since its induction in 1986 until October 2012, when it started to also measure digital sales and streaming activity. In 2010, the category was split into three: Male, Female, and Duo or Group.

== Recipients ==
=== 1994–2009 ===
Year	Artist	Nominees	Ref.
1994	Los Fantasmas del Caribe	Nominations were not provided prior to 1999.	
1995	Selena	Nominations were not provided prior to 1999.	
1996	Selena	Nominations were not provided prior to 1999.	
1997	Enrique Iglesias	Nominations were not provided prior to 1999.	
1998	Enrique Iglesias	Nominations were not provided prior to 1999.	
1999	Alejandro Fernandez	Ricky Martin; Marc Anthony; Elvis Crespo	
2000	Enrique Iglesias	Ricky Martin; Marco Antonio Solís; Cristian Castro	
2001	Son By Four	Marc Anthony; Cristian Castro; Conjunto Primavera	
2002	Cristian Castro	Juan Gabriel; Marco Antonio Solís; Banda El Recodo	
2003	Alexandre Pires	Cristian Castro; Enrique Iglesias; Juanes	
2004	Conjunto Primavera	Intocable; Juanes; Ricky Martin	
2005	Paulina Rubio	Juanes; Grupo Montez de Durango; Marco Antonio Solís	
2006	Juanes	Daddy Yankee; Shakira; Wisin & Yandel	
2007	Wisin & Yandel	Aventura; Daddy Yankee; R.K.M. & Ken-Y	
2008	Juan Luis Guerra	Enrique Iglesias; Maná; Wisin & Yandel	
2009	Flex	Vicente Fernandez; Enrique Iglesias; Juanes	

=== Since 2010 ===
==== Male ====
Year	Male Artist	Nominees	Ref.
2010	Tito El Bambino	Luis Fonsi; Espinoza Paz; Joan Sebastian	
2011	Enrique Iglesias	Daddy Yankee; Larry Hernandez; Prince Royce	
2012	Pitbull	Prince Royce; Don Omar; Enrique Iglesias	
2013	Don Omar	Daddy Yankee; Pitbull; Prince Royce	
2014	Prince Royce	Marc Anthony; Daddy Yankee; Romeo Santos	
2015	Romeo Santos	J Balvin; Enrique Iglesias; Prince Royce	
2016	Romeo Santos	Enrique Iglesias; J Balvin; Nicky Jam	
2017	Nicky Jam	Daddy Yankee; J Balvin; Maluma	
2018	Luis Fonsi	J Balvin; Daddy Yankee; Ozuna	
2019	Ozuna	Bad Bunny; Daddy Yankee; J Balvin	
2020	Bad Bunny	Anuel AA; J Balvin; Ozuna	
2021	Bad Bunny	Anuel AA; J Balvin; Jhay Cortez; Maluma	
2022	Bad Bunny	Farruko; Jhay Cortez; Chencho Corleone; Rauw Alejandro	
2023	Peso Pluma	Bad Bunny; Feid; Junior H; Natanael Cano	
2024	Peso Pluma	Bad Bunny; Feid; Junior H; Xavi	
2025	Bad Bunny	Netón Vega; Peso Pluma; Rauw Alejandro; Tito Double P	

==== Female ====
Year	Female Artist	Nominees	Ref.
2010	Shakira	Nelly Furtado; Fanny Lu; Paulina Rubio	
2011	Shakira	Ivy Queen; Lady Gaga; Thalía	
2012	Shakira	Alejandra Guzmán; Jennifer Lopez; Jenni Rivera	
2013	Shakira	Leslie Grace; Jennifer Lopez; Jenni Rivera	
2014	Thalía	Christina Aguilera; Leslie Grace; Jenni Rivera	
2015	Natalia Jimenez	Chiquis Rivera; Jenni Rivera; Shakira	
2016	Shakira	Jennifer Lopez; Natalia Jimenez; Natti Natasha	
2017	Shakira	Becky G; Jennifer Lopez; Thalía	
2018	Shakira	Becky G; Jennifer Lopez; Natti Natasha	
2019	Natti Natasha	Becky G; Jennifer Lopez; Karol G	
2020	Karol G	Becky G; Natti Natasha; Rosalía	
2021	Karol G	Kali Uchis; Natti Natasha; Rosalía; Selena Gomez	
2022	Karol G	Anitta; Becky G; Kali Uchis; Rosalía	
2023	Karol G	Becky G; Rosalía; Shakira; Young Miko	
2024	Karol G	Anitta; Kali Uchis; Shakira; Young Miko	
2025	Karol G	Selena Gomez; Shakira; Yailin La Más Viral; Young Miko	

==== Duo or Group ====
Year	Duo or Group	Nominees	Ref.
2010	Aventura	Banda El Recodo; La Arrolladora Banda El Limón; La Quinta Estación	
2011	La Arrolladora Banda El Limón	Aventura; Banda El Recodo; Camila	
2012	Maná	Julión Álvarez y Su Norteño Banda; La Adictiva Banda San José de Mesillas; Wisin & Yandel	
2013	Banda El Recodo	Calibre 50; La Arrolladora Banda El Limón; Wisin & Yandel	
2014	La Arrolladora Banda El Limón	Banda El Recodo; Banda Sinaloense MS; Voz de Mando	
2015	Banda Sinaloense MS	Julión Álvarez y Su Norteño Banda; Banda Los Recoditos; Calibre 50	
2016	Banda Sinaloense MS	Los Plebes del Rancho; Calibre 50; Julión Álvarez y Su Norteño Banda	
2017	Banda Sinaloense MS	La Arrolladora Banda El Limón; Los Plebes del Rancho; Zion & Lennox	
2018	Calibre 50	Banda Sinaloense MS; CNCO; Zion & Lennox	
2019	Banda Sinaloense MS	Calibre 50; T3r Elemento; Zion & Lennox	
2020	Calibre 50	Banda los Sebastianes de Mazatlán, Sinaloa; Banda Sinaloense MS; Wisin & Yandel	
2021	Eslabon Armado	Aventura; Banda Sinaloense MS; Black Eyed Peas; Los Legendarios	
2022	Grupo Firme	Aventura; Calibre 50; Eslabon Armado; Fuerza Regida	
2023	Grupo Frontera	Eslabon Armado; Fuerza Regida; Grupo Marca Registrada; Yahritza y Su Esencia	
2024	Fuerza Regida	Eslabon Armado; Grupo Frontera; Grupo Firme; Julión Álvarez y Su Norteño Banda	
2025	Fuerza Regida	Clave Especial; Grupo Frontera; Julión Álvarez y Su Norteño Banda; The Marias	

== Records ==
=== Most nominations ===
==== General ====
From 1994 to 2009

Nominations	Act
6	Enrique Iglesias
5	Juanes
4	Cristian Castro
3	Marco Antonio Solís
3	Ricky Martin
3	Wisin & Yandel
2	Conjunto Primavera
2	Daddy Yankee
2	Marc Anthony
2	Selena

==== Male ====
From 2010 ongoing

Nominations	Act
8	Bad Bunny
7	J Balvin
6	Daddy Yankee
5	Prince Royce
4	Enrique Iglesias
3	Ozuna
3	Peso Pluma
3	Romeo Santos
2	Luis Fonsi
2	Pitbull
2	Don Omar
2	Nicky Jam
2	Maluma
2	Anuel AA
2	Feid
2	Jhayco
2	Rauw Alejandro

==== Female ====
From 2010 ongoing

Nominations	Act
11	Shakira
7	Karol G
6	Becky G
6	Jennifer Lopez
5	Natti Natasha
4	Thalía
4	Jenni Rivera
4	Rosalía
3	Kali Uchis
3	Young Miko
2	Leslie Grace
2	Anitta
2	Natalia Jiménez

==== Duo or Group ====
From 2010 ongoing

Nominations	Act
8	Banda Sinaloense MS
7	Calibre 50
5	Julión Álvarez y Su Norteño Banda
5	La Arrolladora Banda El Limón
4	Aventura
4	Banda El Recodo
4	Eslabon Armado
4	Fuerza Regida
3	Grupo Frontera
3	Wisin & Yandel
3	Zion & Lennox
2	Los Plebes del Rancho
2	Grupo Firme

=== Most wins ===
==== General ====
From 1994 to 2009

Awards	Act
3	Enrique Iglesias
2	Selena

==== Male ====
From 2010 ongoing

Awards	Act
4	Bad Bunny
2	Romeo Santos
2	Peso Pluma

==== Female ====
From 2010 ongoing

Awards	Act
7	Shakira
6	Karol G

==== Duo or Group ====
From 2010 ongoing

Awards	Act
4	Banda Sinaloense MS
2	La Arrolladora Banda El Limón
2	Calibre 50
2	Fuerza Regida

== See also ==
- Billboard Music Award for Top Latin Artist
- Billboard Music Award for Top Latin Male Artist
- Billboard Music Award for Top Latin Female Artist
