= Billboard Music Award for Top Latin Artist =

Annual American music award

Billboard Music Awards for Top Latin Artist
- Current: 2024 Billboard Music Awards
- Awarded for: Top Latin Artist
- Country: United States
- Presented by: ABC
- First award: 2011
- Currently held by: Bad Bunny (2024)

Highlights
- Most awards: Bad Bunny (5)
- Most nominations: Romeo Santos (7)

The Billboard Music Award for Top Latin Artist recognizes the most successful Latin artists over the past year. Colombian performer Shakira was the first artist to win the accolade in 2011 and also won the following year in 2012. Puerto Rican singer and songwriter Bad Bunny is the only artist to have won the accolade three, four, and five years back to back. American performer Jenni Rivera is the only artist to win the award posthumously, following her death in 2012. American performer Prince Royce is the most nominated artist without a win, with five unsuccessful nominations.

== Winners and nominees ==
Year	Winner	Nominees	Ref.
2024	Bad Bunny	Junior H; Fuerza Regida; Karol G; Peso Pluma	
2023	Bad Bunny	Eslabon Armado; Fuerza Regida; Karol G; Peso Pluma	
2022	Bad Bunny	Rauw Alejandro; Farruko; Kali Uchis; Karol G	
2021	Bad Bunny	Anuel AA; J Balvin; Maluma; Ozuna	
2020	Bad Bunny	Anuel AA; J Balvin; Ozuna; Romeo Santos	
2019	Ozuna	J Balvin; Romeo Santos; Anuel AA; Bad Bunny	
2018	Ozuna	J Balvin; Luis Fonsi; Daddy Yankee	
2017	Juan Gabriel	J Balvin; Nicky Jam; Ariel Camacho y Los Plebes del Rancho	
2016	Romeo Santos	Banda Sinaloense MS De Sergio Lizárraga; Juan Gabriel; Nicky Jam; Ariel Camacho y Los Plebes del Rancho	
2015	Romeo Santos	J Balvin; Juan Gabriel; Enrique Iglesias; Prince Royce	
2014	Marc Anthony	Gerardo Ortíz; Jenni Rivera; Prince Royce; Romeo Santos	
2013	Jenni Rivera	Don Omar; Prince Royce; Romeo Santos; Shakira	
2012	Shakira	Maná; Pitbull; Prince Royce; Romeo Santos	
2011	Shakira	Enrique Iglesias; Pitbull; Prince Royce; Wisin & Yandel	

== Artists with multiple wins ==
5 wins

- Bad Bunny

2 wins

- Shakira
- Ozuna
- Romeo Santos

== Artists with multiple nominations ==
7 nominations

- Romeo Santos

6 nominations

- Bad Bunny
- J Balvin

5 nominations

- Prince Royce

3 nominations

- Karol G
- Shakira
- Anuel AA
- Ozuna
- Juan Gabriel

2 nominations

- Fuerza Regida
- Pitbull
- Peso Pluma
- Enrique Iglesias
- Jenni Rivera
- Nicky Jam
- Ariel Camacho y Los Plebes del Rancho
- Rauw Alejandro

== See also ==
- Billboard Music Award for Top Latin Male Artist
- Billboard Music Award for Top Latin Female Artist
- Billboard Latin Music Award for Hot Latin Songs Artist of the Year
