= Billboard Music Award for Top Latin Touring Artist =

Annual American music award

- Country: United States
- Presented by: Billboard
- First award: 2022
- Currently held by: Luis Miguel (2024)

Highlights
- Most wins: Karol G (1); Los Bukis (1); Luis Miguel (1)
- Most nominations: Karol G & Bad Bunny (2)
- Website: billboardmusicawards.com

The following list shows the winners and nominees for the Billboard Music Award for Top Latin Touring Artist. First given in 2022, Los Bukis was the first winner. Karol G and Bad Bunny have been nominated for this award twice.

== Winners and nominees ==
Winners are listed first and highlighted in bold.

Year	Artist	Ref.
2022	**Los Bukis**	
2022	Bad Bunny	
2022	Enrique Iglesias & Ricky Martin	
2023	**Karol G**	
2023	Daddy Yankee	
2023	RBD	
2024	**Luis Miguel**	
2024	Karol G	
2024	Bad Bunny	

== Artists with multiple nominations ==
2 nominations

- Karol G
- Bad Bunny
