= MTV Europe Music Award for Best Caribbean Act =

Category of MTV Europe Music Awards

The following is a list of the MTV Europe Music Award winners and nominees for Best Caribbean Act. This category was always won by Puerto Rico.

== Winners and nominees ==
=== 2010s ===
Year	Artist	Nationality	Ref
2019
2019	Anuel AA	Puerto Rico	
2019	Bad Bunny	Puerto Rico	
2019	Daddy Yankee	Puerto Rico	
2019	Ozuna	Puerto Rico	
2019	Pedro Capó	Puerto Rico	

=== 2020s ===
Year	Artist	Nationality	Ref
2020
2020	Bad Bunny	Puerto Rico	
2020	Anuel AA	Puerto Rico	
2020	Ozuna	Puerto Rico	
2020	Residente	Puerto Rico	
2020	Rauw Alejandro	Puerto Rico	
2021
2021	Bad Bunny	Puerto Rico	
2021	Farruko	Puerto Rico	
2021	Guaynaa	Puerto Rico	
2021	Natti Natasha	Dominican Republic	
2021	Rauw Alejandro	Puerto Rico	
2022
2022	Daddy Yankee	Puerto Rico	
2022	Bad Bunny	Puerto Rico	
2022	Natti Natasha	Dominican Republic	
2022	Myke Towers	Puerto Rico	
2022	Rauw Alejandro	Puerto Rico	
2023
2023	Young Miko	Puerto Rico	
2023	Eladio Carrión	Puerto Rico	
2023	Mora	Puerto Rico	
2023	Myke Towers	Puerto Rico	
2023	Rauw Alejandro	Puerto Rico	
2024
2024	Young Miko	Puerto Rico	
2024	Eladio Carrión	Puerto Rico	
2024	Luar La L	Puerto Rico	
2024	Myke Towers	Puerto Rico	
2024	Yovngchimi	Puerto Rico	

== See also ==
- MTV Video Music Award for Best Latin Artist
- MTV VMA International Viewer's Choice Award for MTV Latin America
- MTV VMA International Viewer's Choice Award for MTV Internacional
- Los Premios MTV Latinoamérica
  - Los Premios MTV Latinoamérica for Best MTV Tr3́s Artist
