= Bad Bunny discography =

Latin music recording artist discography

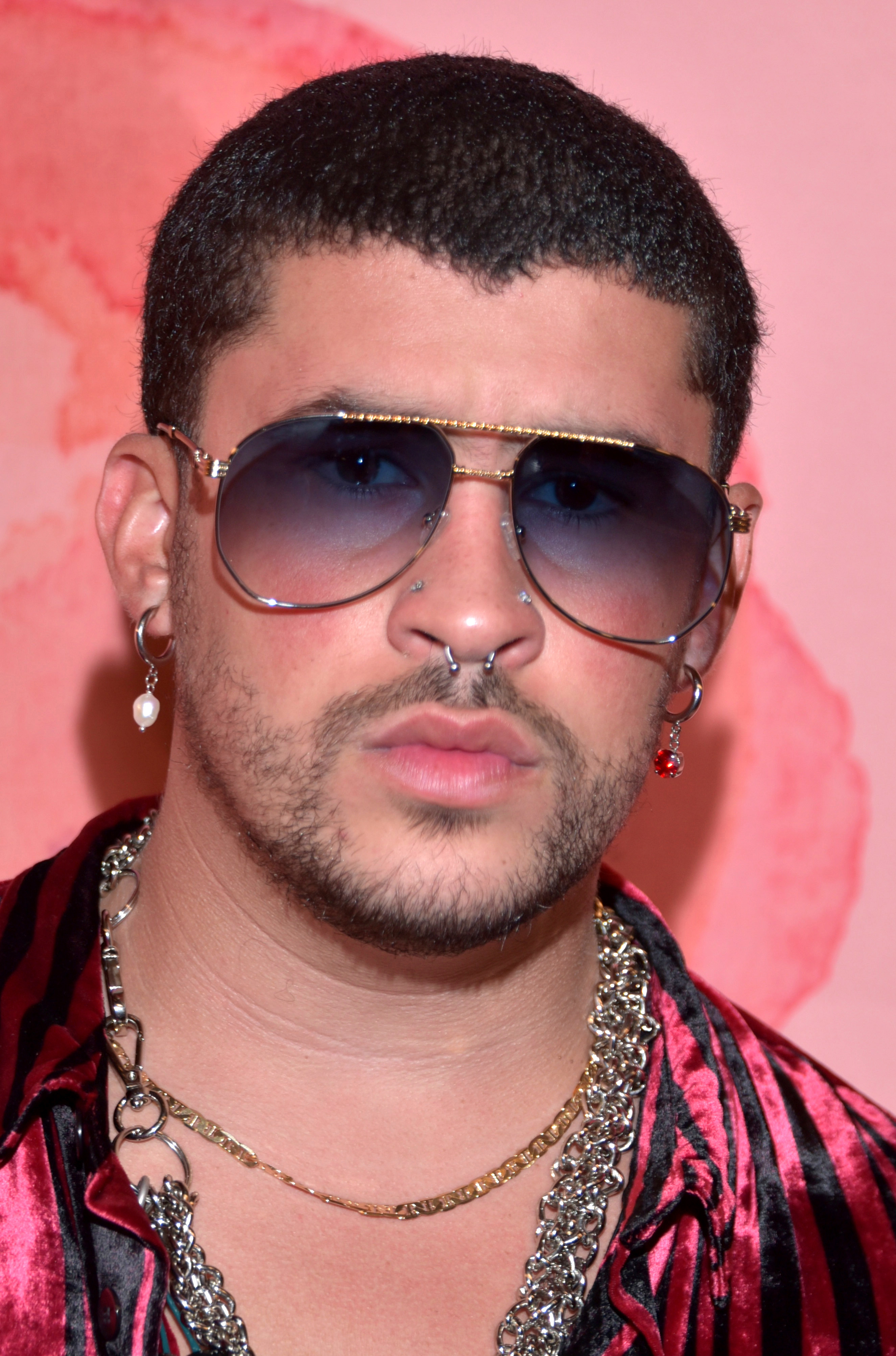
- Bad Bunny in 2019
- Studio albums: 7
- EPs: 1
- Singles: 108
- Mixtapes: 1
- Compilation: 1

Puerto Rican rapper Bad Bunny has released seven studio albums, one mixtape, one extended play, one compilation album, one hundred and eight singles as a lead artist and twenty-seven singles as a featured artist.

His first studio album X 100pre was released on Christmas Eve, 2018. It debuted at number eleven on the Billboard 200 chart and at number one on the Top Latin Albums chart and received a Latin diamond certification by the Recording Industry Association of America (RIAA) for selling over 600,000 copies in the United States.

For his second studio album, he joined J Balvin and released their collaborative album, Oasis, on June 28, 2019. The album topped the Top Latin Albums chart, debuted in the top ten of the Billboard 200 chart, and was certified 2× Platinum by the RIAA.

As of January 2025, the musician has had 113 songs enter the Billboard Hot 100, including the number-one hit "I Like It" (with Cardi B and J Balvin), and the top-five singles "Mia" (featuring Drake) and "Dakiti" (featuring Jhay Cortez). Alongside this, he has had 29 songs reach over one billion streams on Spotify. Moreover, Bad Bunny has collaborated with multiple artists, including Ricky Martin, Rosalía, Rauw Alejandro, Jennifer Lopez, Maluma, Daddy Yankee, Anuel AA, Enrique Iglesias, Becky G, Karol G, Feid, Farruko, Ozuna, Prince Royce, and Marc Anthony.

== Albums ==
=== Studio albums ===
List of studio albums, with selected details, chart positions, sales, and certifications
Title	Details	Peak chart positions										Sales (Note: Figures include album sales and equivalent units.)	Certifications
Title	Details	US	US Latin	BEL (WA)	CAN	FRA	ITA	NLD	SPA	SWI	UK	Sales	Certifications
X 100pre	Released: December 24, 2018; Label: Rimas Entertainment; Formats: CD, LP, digital download, streaming	11	1	—	36	—	64	130	11	72	—	US: 66,000 (Note: Figures comprise first-week 30,000 and second-week 36,000 sales and equivalent albums.)	RIAA: Diamond (Latin); FIMI: Platinum; PROMUSICAE: Platinum
YHLQMDLG	Released: February 29, 2020; Label: Rimas Entertainment; Format: LP, cassette, digital download, streaming	2	1	75	17	79	14	27	1	12	—	US: 1,444,000	RIAA: 24× Platinum (Latin); FIMI: Platinum; PROMUSICAE: 3× Platinum
El Último Tour del Mundo	Released: November 27, 2020; Label: Rimas Entertainment; Format: LP, digital download, streaming	1	1	74	23	123	23	58	1	25	—	US: 348,000	RIAA: 6× Platinum (Latin); FIMI: Platinum; PROMUSICAE: 2× Platinum
Un Verano Sin Ti	Released: May 6, 2022; Labels: Rimas Entertainment; Formats: CD, digital download, streaming	1	1	23	4	23	4	5	1	3	62	US: 3,400,000 (Note: Figures include album sales, streaming equivalent albums and track equivalent albums.)	AMPROFON: Diamond+Platinum; BPI: Gold; FIMI: 4× Platinum; PROMUSICAE: 8× Platinum; SNEP: Platinum
Nadie Sabe Lo Que Va a Pasar Mañana	Released: October 13, 2023; Labels: Rimas Entertainment; Formats: LP, digital download, streaming	1	1	13	4	12	2	6	1	1	70	US: 184,000 (Note: Figures include first-week 7,500 album sales, 176,000 streaming equivalent albums and 500 track equivalent albums.)	FIMI: Platinum; PROMUSICAE: 4× Platinum; SNEP: Gold
Debí Tirar Más Fotos	Released: January 5, 2025; Labels: Rimas Entertainment; Formats: CD, digital download, streaming	1	1	1	1	1	1	1	1	1	2	US: 2,883,000 (Note: Figures comprise: 2025: 2,393,000 streaming equivalent albums; Week 56: 119,000 equivalent albums; Week 57: 36,000 equivalent albums; Week 58: 85,000 equivalent albums; Week 59: 250,000 equivalent albums); FRA: 298,600 (Note: France sales figures for Debí Tirar Más Fotos as of June 2026.)	BPI: Gold; FIMI: 5× Platinum; PROMUSICAE: 10× Platinum; SNEP: 3× Platinum
"—" denotes a recording that did not chart or was not released in that territory.

=== Collaborative albums ===
List of studio albums, with selected details
Title	Details	Peak chart positions										Sales	Certifications
Title	Details	US	US Latin	BEL (WA)	CAN	FRA	ITA	NLD	SPA	SWE	SWI	Sales	Certifications
Oasis (with J Balvin)	Released: June 28, 2019; Label: Universal Latino; Format: CD, LP, digital download, streaming	9	1	126	37	95	34	17	23	25	22	US: 5,000 (Note: First week sales of Oasis in the United States.)	RIAA: 2× Diamond (Latin); AMPROFON: Platinum; FIMI: Gold; PROMUSICAE: Gold

=== Mixtapes ===
List of compilation albums, with selected details and chart positions
Title	Details	Peak chart positions							Certifications
Title	Details	US	US Latin	BEL (WA)	FRA	ITA	SPA	SWI	Certifications
Las Que No Iban a Salir	Released: May 10, 2020; Label: Rimas Entertainment; Format: Digital download, streaming	7	1	176	172	90	1	37	RIAA: 3× Platinum (Latin); PROMUSICAE: Platinum

=== Box sets ===
List of box sets, with selected details and chart positions
Title	Details	Peak chart positions	
Title	Details	US	US Latin
Anniversary Trilogy	Released: December 24, 2021; Label: Rimas Entertainment; Format: 6×LP	39	1

== EPs ==
List of extended plays
Title	EP details
Up Next (Live from Apple Piazza Liberty)	Released: August 30, 2019; Label: Rimas Entertainment; Format: Digital download, streaming

== Singles ==
=== As lead artist ===
==== 2010s ====
List of singles as lead artist released in the 2010s, showing year released, selected chart positions, certifications, and originating album
Title	Year	Peak chart positions										Certifications	Album
Title	Year	US	US Latin	ARG	FRA	ITA	MEX	NLD	NZ	SPA	SWI	Certifications	Album
"Guerreando con LeBron"	2014	—	—	—	—	—	—	—	—	—	—		Non-album singles
"Otra Vez" (with Kelmitt and Darell)	2016	—	—	—	—	—	—	—	—	—	—		Non-album singles
"Diles" (with Farruko and Ozuna featuring Arcángel and Ñengo Flow)	2016	—	—	43	—	—	—	—	—	53	—	RIAA: 4× Platinum (Latin); PROMUSICAE: 4× Platinum	Non-album singles
"Tú No Vive Así" (with Arcángel featuring DJ Luian and Mambo Kingz)	2016	—	20	—	—	—	—	—	—	—	—	PROMUSICAE: 2× Platinum; RIAA: 9× Platinum (Latin)	Non-album singles
"Soy Peor"	2016	—	19	—	—	—	—	—	—	48	—	RIAA: 11× Platinum (Latin); FIMI: Gold; PROMUSICAE: 2× Platinum	Non-album singles
"Caile" (with Bryant Myers and Revol featuring Zion and De La Ghetto)	2016	—	—	—	—	—	—	—	—	—	—	RIAA: 2× Platinum (Latin); PROMUSICAE: 2× Platinum	Non-album singles
"Pa Ti" (featuring Bryant Myers)	2017	—	—	—	—	—	—	—	—	—	—	PROMUSICAE: 2× Platinum	Non-album singles
"La Última Vez" (with Anuel AA)	2017	—	34	—	—	—	—	—	—	74	—		Non-album singles
"Crecia" (with Justin Quiles and Almighty)	2017	—	—	—	—	—	—	—	—	—	—		Non-album singles
"No Te Hagas" (with Jory Boy)	2017	—	27	—	—	—	—	—	—	—	—	RIAA: Platinum (Latin); PROMUSICAE: Platinum	Non-album singles
"Tranquilo" (with Kevin Roldán)	2017	—	—	—	—	—	—	—	—	—	—	RIAA: Gold (Latin)	Non-album singles
"Me Mata" (with Hear This Music, Mambo Kingz and DJ Luian featuring Arcángel, Almighty, Bryant Myers, Baby Rasta, Noriel and Brytiago)	2017	—	—	—	—	—	—	—	—	—	—	RIAA: 21× Platinum (Latin); PROMUSICAE: Platinum	Non-album singles
"Blockia" (with Farruko)	2017	—	48	—	—	—	—	—	—	—	—	RIAA: Gold (Latin)	Non-album singles
"Ahora Me Llama" (with Karol G)	2017	—	10	—	—	—	—	—	—	22	—	PROMUSICAE: 2× Platinum	Unstoppable
"Soy Peor (Remix)" (featuring J Balvin, Ozuna and Arcángel)	2017	—	—	—	—	—	—	—	—	—	—	RIAA: Platinum (Latin)	Non-album singles
"Netflixxx" (with Brytiago)	2017	—	—	—	—	—	—	—	—	82	—	RIAA: Platinum (Latin); PROMUSICAE: 2× Platinum	Non-album singles
"Tú No Metes Cabra"	2017	—	38	—	—	—	—	—	—	31	—	RIAA: 3× Platinum (Latin); PROMUSICAE: 2× Platinum	Non-album singles
"Mayores" (with Becky G)	2017	74	3	5	—	—	33	— (Note: "Mayores" did not enter the Dutch Single Top 100, but peaked at number 6 on the Dutch Single Tip chart.)	—	1	—	RIAA: 46× Platinum (Latin); CAPIF: Gold; AMPROFON: 2× Diamond+3× Platinum; FIMI: Gold; PROMUSICAE: 5× Platinum; SNEP: Gold	Mala Santa
"Báilame (Remix)" (with Nacho and Yandel)	2017	—	—	—	—	—	—	—	—	1	—	AMPROFON: 2× Platinum; PROMUSICAE: 5× Platinum	Non-album single
"Krippy Kush" (with Farruko and Rvssian, and Nicki Minaj and 21 Savage)	2017	75	5^{1}	—	—	—	— (Note: "Krippy Kush" did not enter the Billboard Mexico Airplay, but peaked at number 26 on the Mexico Pop Español Airplay chart.)	—	—	20	—	AMPROFON: Diamond; PROMUSICAE: Platinum	TrapXficante
"Lean" (with El Nene La Amenaza "Amenazzy" and Lito Kirino)	2017	—	—	—	—	—	—	—	—	—	—	RIAA: Gold (Latin)	Non-album singles
"Vuelve" (with Daddy Yankee)	2017	—	11	9	—	—	—	—	—	17	—	PROMUSICAE: 2× Platinum	Non-album singles
"Tú No Metes Cabra (Remix)" (featuring Daddy Yankee, Anuel AA and Cosculluela)	2017	—	—	—	—	—	—	—	—	—	—	RIAA: Platinum (Latin)	Non-album singles
"Sensualidad" (with Prince Royce and J Balvin)	2017	— (Note: "Sensualidad" did not enter the Billboard Hot 100, but peaked at number nine on the Bubbling Under Hot 100 chart.)	8	4	—	—	— (Note: "Sensualidad" did not enter the Billboard Mexico Airplay, but peaked at number 46 on the Mexico Pop Español Airplay chart.)	—	—	1	—	RIAA: 28× Platinum (Latin); FIMI: Platinum; PROMUSICAE: 3× Platinum	Non-album singles
"Chambea"	2017	—	26	—	—	—	—	—	—	7	—	RIAA: 3× Platinum (Latin); PROMUSICAE: Platinum	Non-album singles
"Amantes de una Noche" (with Natti Natasha)	2018	—	25	73	—	—	— (Note: "Amantes de una Noche" did not enter the Billboard Mexico Airplay, but peaked at number 33 on the Mexico Pop Español Airplay chart.)	—	—	48	—	RIAA: 2× Platinum(Latin); PROMUSICAE: Platinum	Non-album singles
"Fantasía" (with Alex Sensation)	2018	—	34	—	—	—	—	—	—	—	—		Non-album singles
"Amorfoda"	2018	— (Note: "Amorfoda" did not enter the Billboard Hot 100, but peaked at number seven on the Bubbling Under Hot 100 chart.)	10	18	—	—	—	—	—	1	—	RIAA: 5× Platinum (Latin); PROMUSICAE: 3× Platinum	Non-album singles
"Dime Si Te Acuerdas"	2018	—	25	—	—	—	—	—	—	32	—	RIAA: 2× Platinum (Latin); PROMUSICAE: Platinum	Non-album singles
"Dime" (with J Balvin and Revol featuring Arcángel and De La Ghetto)	2018	—	21	—	—	—	—	—	—	—	—	RIAA: Gold (Latin)	Non-album singles
"I Like It" (with Cardi B and J Balvin)	2018	1	—	41	19	24	— (Note: "I Like It" did not enter the Billboard Mexico Airplay, but peaked at number 3 on the Mexico Ingles Airplay chart.)	30	7	10	8	RIAA: 11× Platinum; CAPIF: Gold; IFPI SWI: 2× Platinum; FIMI: 2× Platinum; PROMUSICAE: 3× Platinum; RMNZ: 4× Platinum; SNEP: Diamond	Invasion of Privacy
"Estamos Bien"	2018	— (Note: "Estamos Bien" did not enter the Billboard Hot 100, but peaked at number nine on the Bubbling Under Hot 100 chart.)	9	91	—	—	—	—	—	25	—	RIAA: 3× Platinum (Latin); PROMUSICAE: 2× Platinum	X 100pre
"Satisfacción" (with Nicky Jam and Arcángel)	2018	—	35	—	—	—	—	—	—	—	—	AMPROFON: Gold	Non-album singles
"¿Cuál Es Tu Plan?" (with DJ Nelson featuring Ñejo and PJ Sin Suela)	2018	—	—	—	—	—	—	—	—	56	—	RIAA: Gold (Latin); PROMUSICAE: Platinum	Non-album singles
"Como Soy" (with Pacho and Daddy Yankee)	2018	—	39	—	—	—	—	—	—	99	—	RIAA: 4× Platinum (Latin)	Non-album singles
"Está Rico" (with Marc Anthony and Will Smith)	2018	— (Note: "Está Rico" did not enter the Billboard Hot 100, but peaked at number four on the Bubbling Under Hot 100 chart.)	5	77	—	—	—	—	—	14	—	AMPROFON: 2× Platinum; PROMUSICAE: 2× Platinum	Non-album singles
"Mía" (featuring Drake)	2018	5	1	3	14	14	9	27	— (Note: "Mia" did not enter the NZ Top 40 Singles Chart, but peaked at number four on the NZ Hot Singles Chart.)	1	3	RIAA: 96× Platinum (Latin); IFPI SWI: Gold; FIMI: 2× Platinum; PROMUSICAE: 4× Platinum; RMNZ: Platinum; SNEP: Diamond	X 100pre
"Te Guste" (with Jennifer Lopez)	2018	—	12	—	—	—	—	—	—	52	—		Non-album single
"Solo de Mí"	2018	93	6	66	—	—	—	—	—	10	—	RIAA: 17× Platinum (Latin); PROMUSICAE: Platinum	X 100pre
"Caro"	2019	—	14	64	—	—	—	—	—	36	—	PROMUSICAE: Platinum	X 100pre
"Si Estuviésemos Juntos"	2019	—	24	—	—	—	—	—	24	88	—	PROMUSICAE: 3× Platinum	X 100pre
"La Romana" (with El Alfa)	2019	—	12	—	—	—	—	—	—	80	—	FIMI: Gold; PROMUSICAE: 2× Platinum	X 100pre
"200 MPH" (featuring Diplo)	2019	—	21	—	—	—	—	—	—	95	—	RIAA: 12× Platinum (Latin); PROMUSICAE: Gold	X 100pre
"Ni Bien Ni Mal"	2019	— (Note: "Ni Bien Ni Mal" did not enter the Billboard Hot 100, but peaked at number ten on the Bubbling Under Hot 100 chart.)	8	25	—	—	52	—	—	3	—	FIMI: Gold; PROMUSICAE: 2× Platinum	X 100pre
"Callaíta" (with Tainy)	2019	52	2	9	140	50	24	—	—	1	57	FIMI: Platinum; PROMUSICAE: 7× Platinum; SNEP: Gold	Un Verano Sin Ti
"Soltera (Remix)" (with Daddy Yankee and Lunay)	2019	66	3	3	—	61	—	—	—	1	—	PROMUSICAE: 5× Platinum	Épico
"No Me Conoce (Remix)" (with Jhay Cortez and J Balvin)	2019	71	4	4	—	—	—	—	—	4	—	RIAA: 9× Diamond (Latin)	Famouz
"Estamos Arriba" (with Myke Towers)	2019	—	33	—	—	—	—	—	—	54	—	RIAA: 3× Platinum (Latin); PROMUSICAE: Gold	Non-album single
"Qué Pretendes" (with J Balvin)	2019	65	2	24	—	72	19	— (Note: "Que Pretendes" did not enter the Dutch Single Top 100, but peaked at number 4 on the Dutch Single Tip chart.)	—	5	31	RIAA: Platinum (Latin); FIMI: Gold; PROMUSICAE: 3× Platinum	Oasis
"La Canción" (with J Balvin)	2019	27	1	16	138	64	1	—	—	6	—	RIAA: Platinum (Latin); FIMI: Platinum; PROMUSICAE: 6× Platinum; SNEP: Platinum	Oasis
"Bellacoso" (with Residente)	2019	—	24	35	—	—	—	—	—	61	—	AMPROFON: 4× Platinum; PROMUSICAE: Gold	Non-album single
"Kemba Walker" (with Eladio Carrión)	2019	—	—	—	—	—	—	—	—	83	—	RIAA: 4× Platinum (Latin); AMPROFON: 3× Platinum+Gold	Sauce Boyz
"Yo Le Llego" (with J Balvin)	2019	—	18	—	—	—	—	—	—	45	—	RIAA: Gold (Latin); PROMUSICAE: Gold	Oasis
"Cuidao por Ahí" (with J Balvin)	2019	—	26	60	—	—	—	—	—	61	—	RIAA: Gold (Latin)	Oasis
"Soy El Diablo (Remix)" (with Natanael Cano)	2019	—	16	—	—	—	—	—	—	—	—	RIAA: 4× Platinum (Latin)	Todo Es Diferente
"Cántalo" (with Ricky Martin and Residente)	2019	—	35	—	—	—	—	—	—	—	—	RIAA: Gold (Latin); AMPROFON: Gold	Pausa
"Vete"	2019	33	1	30	—	—	—	—	—	2	63	RIAA: 27× Platinum (Latin); FIMI: Gold; PROMUSICAE: 4× Platinum	YHLQMDLG
"¿Quién Tú Eres?"	2019	—	—	—	—	—	—	—	—	—	—	PROMUSICAE: Gold	X 100pre
"—" denotes a recording that did not chart or was not released in that territory.

==== 2020s ====
List of singles as lead artist released in the 2020s, showing year released, selected chart positions, certifications, and originating album
Title	Year	Peak chart positions										Certifications	Album
Title	Year	US	US Latin	ARG	COL	FRA	ITA	MEX	SPA	SWI	WW	Certifications	Album
"Ignorantes" (with Sech)	2020	49	3	29	—	—	100	4	4	48	—	RIAA: 15× Platinum (Latin); PROMUSICAE: 2× Platinum	YHLQMDLG
"La Difícil"	2020	33	2	48	—	—	79	3	2	69	—	RIAA: 15× Platinum (Latin); PROMUSICAE: 3× Platinum	YHLQMDLG
"Si Veo a Tu Mamá"	2020	32	1	72	11	—	—	2	10	—	—	RIAA: 17× Platinum (Latin); PROMUSICAE: 2× Platinum	YHLQMDLG
"Pero Ya No"	2020	63	8	—	—	—	—	—	14	—	—	PROMUSICAE: Platinum	YHLQMDLG
"Hablamos Mañana" (featuring Duki and Pablo Chill-E)	2020	—	22	37	—	—	—	—	40	—	—	PROMUSICAE: Platinum	YHLQMDLG
"Bichiyal" (featuring Yaviah)	2020	89	11	—	—	—	—	—	22	—	—	PROMUSICAE: Platinum	YHLQMDLG
"Yo Perreo Sola"	2020	53	2	2	2	—	—	6	4	—	79	RIAA: 24× Platinum (Latin); FIMI: Gold; PROMUSICAE: 3× Platinum	YHLQMDLG
"En Casita" (with Gabriela)	2020	—	33	—	—	—	—	—	31	—	—		Las Que No Iban a Salir
"Cómo Se Siente (Remix)" (with Jhay Cortez)	2020	—	7	61	—	—	—	—	—	—	—		Las Que No Iban a Salir
"Un Día (One Day)" (with J Balvin, Dua Lipa and Tainy)	2020	63	1	22	5	144	23	3	6	30	30	RIAA: 15× Platinum (Latin); AMPROFON: Diamond+4× Platinum+Gold; FIMI: Platinum; PROMUSICAE: 3× Platinum	Jose and Future Nostalgia: The Moonlight Edition
"Una Vez" (featuring Mora)	2020	— (Note: "Una Vez" did not enter the Billboard Hot 100, but peaked at number 12 on the Bubbling Under Hot 100 chart.)	18	—	—	—	—	—	43	—	—	PROMUSICAE: 2× Platinum	YHLQMDLG
"Dakiti" (with Jhay Cortez)	2020	5	1	1	19	5	11	32	1	12	1	RIAA: 24× Platinum (Latin); FIMI: 3× Platinum; PROMUSICAE: 9× Platinum; SNEP: Diamond	El Último Tour del Mundo
"Yo Visto Así"	2020	64	5	74	—	—	—	—	4	—	25	PROMUSICAE: Platinum	El Último Tour del Mundo
"Booker T"	2021	78	8	—	—	—	—	—	13	—	45	PROMUSICAE: Platinum	El Último Tour del Mundo
"La Noche de Anoche" (with Rosalía)	2021	53	2	3	—	—	—	—	1	41	7	FIMI: Gold; PROMUSICAE: 6× Platinum	El Último Tour del Mundo
"100 Millones" (with Luar la L)	2021	— (Note: "100 Millones" did not enter the Billboard Hot 100, but peaked at number 13 on the Bubbling Under Hot 100 chart.)	9	—	—	—	—	—	74	—	143		Non-album singles
"Yonaguni"	2021	10	1	5	9	—	95	2	2	31	3	FIMI: Platinum; PROMUSICAE: 7× Platinum	Non-album singles
"AM" (Remix) (with Nio García and J Balvin)	2021	41	4	7	22	—	—	21	6	—	10	RIAA: 2× Diamond (Latin); PROMUSICAE: 3× Platinum	Non-album singles
"Volando" (Remix) (with Mora and Sech)	2021	89	7	29	14	—	—	—	3	—	27	AMPROFON: 3× Platinum; PROMUSICAE: 6× Platinum	Non-album singles
"Volví" (with Aventura)	2021	22	1	24	23	—	—	15	3	24	11	FIMI: Gold; PROMUSICAE: 4× Platinum	Non-album singles
"Lo Siento BB:/" (with Tainy and Julieta Venegas)	2021	51	2	39	9	—	—	1	5	74	12	RIAA: 31× Platinum (Latin); PROMUSICAE: 2× Platinum	Data
"Te Deseo Lo Mejor"	2021	74	7	—	—	—	—	—	9	—	39	PROMUSICAE: Gold	El Último Tour del Mundo
"Moscow Mule"	2022	4	1	8	2	141	77	1	1	25	2	FIMI: Gold; PROMUSICAE: 6× Platinum; SNEP: Gold	Un Verano Sin Ti
"Tití Me Preguntó"	2022	5	1	5	2	14	8	2	1	3	4	FIMI: 4× Platinum; PROMUSICAE: 9× Platinum; SNEP: Diamond	Un Verano Sin Ti
"Después de la Playa"	2022	6	3	57	6	—	—	6	5	91	7	PROMUSICAE: 2× Platinum	Un Verano Sin Ti
"Me Porto Bonito" (with Chencho Corleone)	2022	6	1	4	1	—	79	1	2	72	2	FIMI: Platinum; PROMUSICAE: 8× Platinum; SNEP: Platinum	Un Verano Sin Ti
"Party" (with Rauw Alejandro)	2022	14	4	33	6	—	—	3	7	—	8	PROMUSICAE: 2× Platinum	Un Verano Sin Ti
"Neverita"	2022	31	10	48	15	—	—	6	11	—	16	PROMUSICAE: 3× Platinum	Un Verano Sin Ti
"El Apagón"	2022	54	19	—	—	—	—	25	21	—	35	PROMUSICAE: Gold	Un Verano Sin Ti
"La Jumpa" (with Arcángel)	2022	68	3	27	3	—	—	2	1	—	14	PROMUSICAE: 6× Platinum	Sr. Santos
"Gato de Noche" (with Ñengo Flow)	2022	60	2	50	8	—	—	8	8	—	28	PROMUSICAE: 2× Platinum	Real G 4 Life, Vol. 4
"Ojitos Lindos" (with Bomba Estéreo)	2023	26	7	4	1	—	—	1	2	57	4	FIMI: Platinum; PROMUSICAE: 8× Platinum; SNEP: Gold	Un Verano Sin Ti
"Un x100to" (with Grupo Frontera)	2023	5	2	6	1	—	—	2	10	77	1	AMPROFON: Diamond+3× Platinum+Gold; PROMUSICAE: 2× Platinum	El Comienzo
"Where She Goes"	2023	8	2	16	2	103	17	6	1	5	1	FIMI: 2× Platinum; PROMUSICAE: 5× Platinum; SNEP: Gold	Nadie Sabe Lo Que Va a Pasar Mañana
"K-pop" (with Travis Scott and the Weeknd)	2023	7	—	—	—	20	20	—	24	3	5	RIAA: Platinum; AMPROFON: Platinum; FIMI: Gold; IFPI SWI: Gold; PROMUSICAE: Gold	Utopia
"Un Preview"	2023	43	2	38	10	—	93	17	5	33	13	PROMUSICAE: Platinum	Nadie Sabe Lo Que Va a Pasar Mañana
"Mónaco"	2023	5	1	18	2	47	44	1	1	10	1	FIMI: Gold; PROMUSICAE: 2× Platinum; SNEP: Platinum	Nadie Sabe Lo Que Va a Pasar Mañana
"Baticano"	2023	78	22	—	—	—	—	—	34	—	59		Nadie Sabe Lo Que Va a Pasar Mañana
"Perro Negro" (with Feid)	2023	20	2	22	1	—	—	4	2	66	4	FIMI: Gold; PROMUSICAE: 5× Platinum	Nadie Sabe Lo Que Va a Pasar Mañana
"No Me Quiero Casar"	2023	65	19	60	30	—	—	—	29	—	48	PROMUSICAE: 2× Platinum	Nadie Sabe Lo Que Va a Pasar Mañana
"Acho PR" (with Arcángel, De la Ghetto and Ñengo Flow)	2024	83	24	—	11	—	—	—	22	—	47	PROMUSICAE: Gold	Nadie Sabe Lo Que Va a Pasar Mañana
"Adivino" (with Myke Towers)	2024	63	2	48	4	—	—	14	3	73	28	RIAA: 14× Platinum (Latin); AMPROFON: Platinum+Gold; PROMUSICAE: 3× Platinum	La Pantera Negra
"Una Velita"	2024	79	4	—	—	—	—	—	15	—	81		Non-album single
"Qué Pasaría..." (with Rauw Alejandro)	2024	34	2	16	14	178	94	9	1	32	20	RIAA: Gold (Latin); AMPROFON: Diamond+2× Platinum+Gold; FIMI: Gold; PROMUSICAE: 3× Platinum; SNEP: Gold	Cosa Nuestra
"El Clúb"	2024	27	2	21	10	100	68	18	3	—	18	PROMUSICAE: Platinum	Debí Tirar Más Fotos
"Pitorro de Coco"	2024	50	10	59	20	177	—	—	11	—	33	PROMUSICAE: Platinum	Debí Tirar Más Fotos
"Baile Inolvidable"	2025	2	1	2	2	13	9	2	1	3	2	FIMI: Platinum; PROMUSICAE: 7× Platinum; SNEP: Diamond	Debí Tirar Más Fotos
"Nuevayol"	2025	5	1	9	3	5	3	9	1	2	3	FIMI: 2× Platinum; PROMUSICAE: 6× Platinum; SNEP: Diamond	Debí Tirar Más Fotos
"DTMF"	2025	1	1	3	1	1	1	1	1	1	1	FIMI: 2× Platinum; PROMUSICAE: 5× Platinum; SNEP: Diamond	Debí Tirar Más Fotos
"Eoo"	2025	11	5	22	5	31	33	9	8	—	4	FIMI: Platinum; PROMUSICAE: 4× Platinum; SNEP: Platinum	Debí Tirar Más Fotos
"—" denotes a recording that did not chart or was not released in that territory.

=== As featured artist ===
List of singles as a featured artist, showing year released, selected chart positions, certifications, and originating album
Title	Year	Peak chart positions								Certifications	Album
Title	Year	US	US Latin	ARG	FRA	ITA	MEX	SPA	SWI	Certifications	Album
"Dema Ga Ge Gi Go Gu" (El Alfa El Jefe featuring Bad Bunny)	2016	—	—	—	—	—	—	—	—	RIAA: Platinum (Latin); PROMUSICAE: Gold	Non-album singles
"Un Polvo" (Maluma featuring Bad Bunny, Arcángel, Ñengo Flow and De La Ghetto)	2016	—	—	—	—	—	—	—	—	PROMUSICAE: Gold	Non-album singles
"Me Llueven" (Mark B featuring and Poeta Callejero)	2017	—	—	—	—	—	—	—	—	RIAA: Platinum (Latin)	Non-album singles
"Te Lo Meto Yo" (Pepe Quintana featuring Bad Bunny, Lary Over, Farruko, Arcángel and Tempo)	2017	—	—	—	—	—	—	—	—	RIAA: Platinum (Latin)	Non-album singles
"Diabla" (Farruko featuring Bad Bunny and Lary Over))	2017	—	—	—	—	—	—	—	—	PROMUSICAE: Gold	Non-album singles
"Me Acostumbré" (Arcángel featuring Bad Bunny)	2017	—	28	—	—	—	—	—	—	PROMUSICAE: Platinum	Non-album singles
"Si Tu Novio Te Deja Sola" (J Balvin featuring Bad Bunny)	2017	—	14	—	—	—	—	—	—	PROMUSICAE: Platinum	Non-album singles
"Puerta Abierta" (Juhn featuring Bad Bunny and Noriel)	2017	—	—	—	—	—	—	—	—	RIAA: 2× Platinum (Latin)	Non-album singles
"Un Ratito Más" (Bryant Myers featuring Bad Bunny)	2017	—	—	—	—	—	—	—	—	RIAA: Gold (Latin); PROMUSICAE: Platinum	Non-album singles
"Amigos y Enemigos" (Trap Capos and Noriel featuring Bad Bunny)	2017	—	—	—	—	—	—	—	—	PROMUSICAE: Gold	Non-album singles
"Si Tu Lo Dejas" (Rvssian featuring Bad Bunny, Farruko, Nicky Jam and King Kosa)	2017	—	—	—	—	—	—	—	—	PROMUSICAE: Gold	Non-album singles
"Explícale" (Yandel featuring Bad Bunny)	2017	—	29	—	—	—	—	26	—	RIAA: 10× Platinum (Latin); PROMUSICAE: Platinum; PROMUSICAE: Platinum (Remix)	Update
"Sexto Sentido" (Gigolo & La Exce featuring Bad Bunny)	2017	—	—	—	—	—	—	—	—	RIAA: 4× Platinum (Latin); PROMUSICAE: Platinum	Non-album singles
"Pure" (EZ el Ezeta with DJ Luian featuring Bad Bunny, Bryant Myers and Farruko)	2017	—	—	—	—	—	—	—	—		Non-album singles
"Mala y Peligrosa" (Víctor Manuelle featuring Bad Bunny)	2017	—	—	—	—	—	— (Note: "Mala y Peligrosa" did not enter the Billboard Hot 100, but peaked at number 48 on the Mexico Popular Airplay chart.)	—	—	RIAA: Platinum (Latin)	25/7
"Move Your Body" (Wisin featuring Bad Bunny and Timbaland)	2017	—	—	—	—	—	—	—	—		Victory
"El Baño" (Enrique Iglesias featuring Bad Bunny)	2018	98	8	8	100	50	1	2	21	AMPROFON: 3× Platinum; IFPI SWI: Gold; FIMI: Gold; PROMUSICAE: 2× Platinum	Final
"Solita" (Ozuna featuring Bad Bunny, Almighty, and Wisin)	2018	—	20	—	—	—	—	20	—	RIAA: 44× Platinum (Latin); FIMI: Gold; PROMUSICAE: 2× Platinum	Non-album singles
"Tocate Tu Misma" (Alexis & Fido featuring Bad Bunny)	2018	—	—	—	—	—	—	—	—		Non-album singles
"Loca (Remix)" (Khea featuring Bad Bunny, Duki and Cazzu)	2018	—	45	22	—	—	—	65	—	RIAA: Gold (Latin); PROMUSICAE: Platinum	Ave María
"Thinkin" (Spiff TV featuring Anuel AA, Bad Bunny and Future)	2018	—	—	—	—	—	—	—	—	RIAA: Gold (Latin)	The Union
"Te Boté (Remix)" (Nio Garcia, Darell and Casper Magico featuring Bad Bunny, Nicky Jam and Ozuna)	2018	36	1	20	—	—	—	—	—	RIAA: 106× Diamond (Latin); PROMUSICAE: 2× Platinum; SNEP: Gold	Non-album singles
"Madura" (Cosculluela featuring Bad Bunny)	2018	— (Note: "Madura" did not enter the Billboard Hot 100, but peaked at number twenty-one on the Bubbling Under Hot 100 chart.)	14	44	—	—	—	9	—	RIAA: Platinum (Latin); PROMUSICAE: 4× Platinum	Non-album singles
"Estamos Clear" (Miky Woodz featuring Bad Bunny)	2018	—	—	—	—	—	—	—	—	RIAA: 3× Platinum (Latin)	El OG
"Dura (Remix)" (Daddy Yankee featuring Natti Natasha, Becky G and Bad Bunny)	2018	—	—	11	—	—	—	1	—	PROMUSICAE: 2× Platinum	Non-album singles
"Te Descuidó" (Barbosa featuring Bryant Myers and Bad Bunny)	2018	—	—	—	—	—	—	—	—		Non-album singles
"X Última Vez" (Daddy Yankee featuring Bad Bunny)	2022	73	5	45	—	—	4	17	—	RIAA: 3× Platinum (Latin); PROMUSICAE: Platinum	Legendaddy
"—" denotes a recording that did not chart or was not released in that territory.

=== Promotional singles ===
List of promotional singles, showing year released, selected chart positions, certifications, and originating album
Title	Year	Peak chart positions							Certifications	Album
Title	Year	US	US Latin	ARG	ECU	SPA	SWI	WW	Certifications	Album
"Desde el Corazón"	2018	—	—	—	—	21	—	—	PROMUSICAE: Gold	Non-album promotional singles
"De Museo"	2021	94	8	—	—	51	—	59	PROMUSICAE: Gold	Non-album promotional singles
"Alambre Púa"	2025	— (Note: "Alambre Púa" did not enter the Billboard Hot 100, but peaked at number one on the Bubbling Under Hot 100 chart.)	8	60	22	12	44	68		Non-album promotional singles
"Super Bowl LX Halftime Show" (Live)	2026	— (Note: "Super Bowl LX Halftime Show (Live)" did not enter the Billboard Hot 100, but peaked at number 12 on the Bubbling Under Hot 100 chart.)	31	—	—	—	—	—		Super Bowl LX Live from Santa Clara, CA
"—" denotes a recording that did not chart or was not released in that territory.

== Other charted and certified songs ==
List of other charted songs, showing year released, selected chart positions, certifications, and originating album
Title	Year	Peak chart positions										Certifications	Album
Title	Year	US	US Latin	ARG	CHL	COL	ECU	MEX	PER	SPA	WW	Certifications	Album
"Hoy" (Ñengo Flow featuring Bad Bunny)	2017	—	—	—	—	—	—	—	—	—	—	PROMUSICAE: Gold	Real G4 Life Vol. 3
"De Las 2" (Noriel featuring Bad Bunny and Arcángel)	2018	—	47	—	—	—	—	—	—	—	—	PROMUSICAE: Gold	Trap Capos: Season 2
"Original" (Arcángel featuring Bad Bunny)	2018	—	28	—	—	—	—	—	—	82	—	PROMUSICAE: Gold	Ares
"Triste" (Bryant Myers featuring Bad Bunny)	2018	—	35	—	—	—	—	—	—	70	—	RIAA: 2× Platinum (Latin); PROMUSICAE: 2× Platinum	La Oscuridad
"Tenemos Que Hablar"	2018	—	42	—	—	—	—	—	—	—	—	PROMUSICAE: Gold	X 100pre
"Otra Noche en Miami"	2018	—	27	—	—	—	—	—	—	93	—	PROMUSICAE: 2× Platinum	X 100pre
"Ser Bichote"	2018	—	44	—	—	—	—	—	—	—	—		X 100pre
"Cuando Perriabas"	2018	—	39	—	—	—	—	—	—	100	—	PROMUSICAE: Gold	X 100pre
"Como Antes"	2018	—	48	—	—	—	—	—	—	—	—	PROMUSICAE: Gold	X 100pre
"RLNDT"	2018	—	50	—	—	—	—	—	—	—	—	PROMUSICAE: Gold	X 100pre
"Dame Algo" (Wisin & Yandel featuring Bad Bunny)	2018	—	—	—	—	—	—	—	—	—	—	AMPROFON: Platinum; RIAA: 3× Platinum (Latin)	Los Campeones del Pueblo
"Mojaita" (with J Balvin)	2019	—	16	—	—	—	—	—	—	20	—	RIAA: Gold (Latin); PROMUSICAE: Platinum	Oasis
"Un Peso" (with J Balvin featuring Marciano Cantero)	2019	—	23	—	—	—	—	—	—	50	—	RIAA: Gold (Latin); PROMUSICAE: Platinum	Oasis
"Odio" (with J Balvin)	2019	—	29	—	—	—	—	—	—	65	—	RIAA: Gold (Latin)	Oasis
"Como Un Bebé" (with J Balvin featuring Mr Eazi)	2019	—	33	—	—	—	—	—	—	55	—	RIAA: 5× Platinum (Latin); PROMUSICAE: Platinum	Oasis
"La Cartera" (Farruko with Bad Bunny)	2019	—	25	72	—	—	—	—	—	59	—	AMPROFON: Platinum; PROMUSICAE: Gold	Gangalee
"Infeliz" (Arcángel with Bad Bunny)	2019	—	33	—	—	—	—	—	—	—	—	RIAA: 2× Platinum (Latin); PROMUSICAE: Platinum	Historias de un Capricornio
"La Santa" (with Daddy Yankee)	2020	53	6	—	25	—	14	18	19	7	151	RIAA: 12× Platinum (Latin); PROMUSICAE: 3× Platinum	YHLQMDLG
"Soliá"	2020	94	12	—	—	—	—	—	—	—	—	PROMUSICAE: Platinum	YHLQMDLG
"La Zona"	2020	— (Note: "La Zona" did not enter the Billboard Hot 100, but peaked at number seven on the Bubbling Under Hot 100 chart.)	15	—	—	—	18	—	—	15	—	PROMUSICAE: 2× Platinum	YHLQMDLG
"Que Malo" (featuring Ñengo Flow)	2020	— (Note: "Que Malo" did not enter the Billboard Hot 100, but peaked at number four on the Bubbling Under Hot 100 chart.)	14	—	—	—	—	—	—	28	—	PROMUSICAE: Platinum	YHLQMDLG
"A Tu Merced"	2020	— (Note: "A Tu Merced" did not enter the Billboard Hot 100, but peaked at number 10 on the Bubbling Under Hot 100 chart.)	15	—	21	21	10	14	13	32	152	PROMUSICAE: 2× Platinum	YHLQMDLG
"Safaera" (featuring Jowell & Randy and Ñengo Flow)	2020	81	4	4	—	—	—	1	—	1	80	RIAA: 21× Platinum (Latin); FIMI: Gold; PROMUSICAE: 3× Platinum	YHLQMDLG
"25/8"	2020	— (Note: "25/8" did not enter the Billboard Hot 100, but peaked at number eight on the Bubbling Under Hot 100 chart.)	14	—	—	—	—	—	—	26	—	PROMUSICAE: Platinum	YHLQMDLG
"Está Cabrón Ser Yo" (featuring Anuel AA)	2020	97	13	—	—	—	—	—	—	15	—	PROMUSICAE: Platinum	YHLQMDLG
"Puesto Pa' Guerrial" (featuring Myke Towers)	2020	—	21	—	—	—	—	—	—	45	—	PROMUSICAE: Gold	YHLQMDLG
"P FKN R" (featuring Kendo Kaponi and Arcángel)	2020	— (Note: "P FKN R" did not enter the Billboard Hot 100, but peaked at number 18 on the Bubbling Under Hot 100 chart.)	19	—	—	—	—	—	—	48	—		YHLQMDLG
"<3"	2020	— (Note: "<3" did not enter the Billboard Hot 100, but peaked at number 24 on the Bubbling Under Hot 100 chart.)	20	—	—	—	—	—	—	24	—	PROMUSICAE: Platinum	YHLQMDLG
"Si Ella Sale"	2020	—	20	—	—	—	—	—	—	18	—		Las que no iban a salir
"Más de Una Cita" (with Zion & Lennox)	2020	—	15	—	—	—	—	—	—	3	—	RIAA: 3× Platinum (Latin); PROMUSICAE: Platinum	Las que no iban a salir
"Bye Me Fui"	2020	— (Note: "Bye Me Fui" did not enter the Billboard Hot 100, but peaked at number 24 on the Bubbling Under Hot 100 chart.)	6	—	—	—	—	—	—	9	—	RIAA: 5× Platinum (Latin); PROMUSICAE: Gold	Las que no iban a salir
"Canción con Yandel" (with Yandel)	2020	—	13	—	—	—	—	—	—	12	—	PROMUSICAE: Platinum	Las que no iban a salir
"Pa' Romperla" (with Don Omar)	2020	—	11	—	—	—	—	—	—	1	—	RIAA: 4× Platinum (Latin); PROMUSICAE: Platinum	Las que no iban a salir
"Bad con Nicky" (with Nicky Jam)	2020	—	13	—	—	—	—	—	—	4	—	RIAA: 4× Platinum (Latin); PROMUSICAE: Platinum	Las que no iban a salir
"Bendiciones"	2020	—	18	—	—	—	—	—	—	13	—	PROMUSICAE: Gold	Las que no iban a salir
"Ronca Freestyle"	2020	—	29	—	—	—	—	—	—	23	—	PROMUSICAE: Gold	Las que no iban a salir
"Así Soy Yo" (with Anuel AA)	2020	—	14	—	—	—	—	—	—	29	—	PROMUSICAE: Gold	Emmanuel
"Hasta Que Dios Diga" (with Anuel AA)	2020	86	4	33	—	—	—	—	—	1	—	AMPROFON: Gold; FIMI: Gold; PROMUSICAE: 5× Platinum	Emmanuel
"El Mundo es Mío"	2020	79	9	—	—	—	—	—	—	18	—		El Último Tour del Mundo
"Te Mudaste"	2020	60	4	72	—	—	—	—	—	5	19	PROMUSICAE: 2× Platinum	El Último Tour del Mundo
"Hoy Cobre"	2020	81	8	—	—	—	—	—	—	15	54	PROMUSICAE: Gold	El Último Tour del Mundo
"Maldita Pobreza"	2020	87	11	—	—	—	—	—	—	14	59	PROMUSICAE: Gold	El Último Tour del Mundo
"Haciendo Que Me Amas"	2020	72	6	—	—	—	—	—	—	7	29	PROMUSICAE: Platinum	El Último Tour del Mundo
"La Droga"	2020	94	12	—	—	—	—	—	—	11	60	PROMUSICAE: Platinum	El Último Tour del Mundo
"Trellas"	2020	— (Note: "Trellas" did not enter the Billboard Hot 100, but peaked at number four on the Bubbling Under Hot 100 chart.)	17	—	—	—	—	—	—	30	83		El Último Tour del Mundo
"Sorry Papi" (with Abra)	2020	— (Note: "Sorry Papi" did not enter the Billboard Hot 100, but peaked at number one on the Bubbling Under Hot 100 chart.)	14	—	—	—	—	—	—	23	72	PROMUSICAE: Gold	El Último Tour del Mundo
"120"	2020	— (Note: "120" did not enter the Billboard Hot 100, but peaked at number two on the Bubbling Under Hot 100 chart.)	15	—	—	—	—	—	—	20	76	PROMUSICAE: 3× Platinum	El Último Tour del Mundo
"Antes que Se Acabe"	2020	— (Note: "Antes que Se Acabe" did not enter the Billboard Hot 100, but peaked at number three on the Bubbling Under Hot 100 chart.)	16	—	—	—	—	—	—	22	71	PROMUSICAE: Gold	El Último Tour del Mundo
"Un Ratito"	2022	16	6	49	9	8	9	9	10	9	11	PROMUSICAE: 2× Platinum	Un Verano Sin Ti
"Yo No Soy Celoso"	2022	22	8	54	14	11	11	11	11	10	14	PROMUSICAE: Platinum	Un Verano Sin Ti
"Tarot" (with Jhay Cortez)	2022	18	7	38	7	7	8	7	9	2	9	FIMI: Gold; PROMUSICAE: 5× Platinum	Un Verano Sin Ti
"La Corriente" (with Tony Dize)	2022	32	12	84	12	12	10	14	14	14	17	PROMUSICAE: 2× Platinum	Un Verano Sin Ti
"Efecto"	2022	34	5	15	3	4	3	3	2	11	7	FIMI: Gold; PROMUSICAE: 3× Platinum	Un Verano Sin Ti
"Aguacero"	2022	44	15	87	24	20	14	19	19	19	27	PROMUSICAE: Platinum	Un Verano Sin Ti
"Enséñame a Bailar"	2022	60	22	—	—	24	22	22	—	15	30	PROMUSICAE: 3× Platinum	Un Verano Sin Ti
"Dos Mil 16"	2022	45	16	91	20	13	15	14	18	16	20	PROMUSICAE: Platinum	Un Verano Sin Ti
"Otro Atardecer" (with the Marías)	2022	49	17	—	—	21	19	17	21	24	28	PROMUSICAE: Platinum	Un Verano Sin Ti
"Un Coco"	2022	56	17	—	23	17	15	20	21	22	29	PROMUSICAE: Platinum	Un Verano Sin Ti
"Andrea" (with Buscabulla)	2022	51	15	64	25	14	13	9	19	20	24	PROMUSICAE: Platinum	Un Verano Sin Ti
"Me Fui de Vacaciones"	2022	59	21	59	15	10	8	10	7	8	18	PROMUSICAE: 2× Platinum	Un Verano Sin Ti
"Un Verano Sin Ti"	2022	55	20	—	21	15	13	15	13	13	23	PROMUSICAE: 2× Platinum	Un Verano Sin Ti
"Agosto"	2022	74	24	—	—	—	23	23	—	23	43	PROMUSICAE: Platinum	Un Verano Sin Ti
"Tormenta" (Gorillaz featuring Bad Bunny)	2023	— (Note: "Tormenta" did not enter the Billboard Hot 100, but peaked at number one on the Bubbling Under Hot 100 chart.)	20	43	12	12	7	11	6	39	33	PROMUSICAE: Gold	Cracker Island
"Coco Chanel" (with Eladio Carrión)	2023	87	14	25	5	4	3	17	5	2	22	PROMUSICAE: 4× Platinum	3men2 Kbrn
"Mojabi Ghost" (with Tainy)	2023	57	9	—	21	15	7	17	8	14	23	PROMUSICAE: 2× Platinum	Data
"Gently" (Drake featuring Bad Bunny)	2023	12	1	—	—	—	—	—	—	43	10	PROMUSICAE: Gold	For All the Dogs
"Nadie Sabe"	2023	22	4	59	14	5	5	15	8	7	12	PROMUSICAE: Platinum	Nadie Sabe Lo Que Va a Pasar Mañana
"Fina" (with Young Miko)	2023	14	2	42	7	3	3	6	3	5	6	PROMUSICAE: Platinum	Nadie Sabe Lo Que Va a Pasar Mañana
"Hibiki" (with Mora)	2023	24	5	60	11	6	4	10	6	4	11	PROMUSICAE: Platinum	Nadie Sabe Lo Que Va a Pasar Mañana
"Mr. October"	2023	28	6	81	22	14	13	19	17	13	19	PROMUSICAE: Gold	Nadie Sabe Lo Que Va a Pasar Mañana
"Cybertruck"	2023	30	7	93	23	17	15	23	21	17	25	PROMUSICAE: Gold	Nadie Sabe Lo Que Va a Pasar Mañana
"Vou 787"	2023	53	14	—	—	24	—	—	—	25	36		Nadie Sabe Lo Que Va a Pasar Mañana
"Seda" (with Bryant Myers)	2023	38	10	72	12	9	22	22	12	6	16	PROMUSICAE: 2× Platinum	Nadie Sabe Lo Que Va a Pasar Mañana
"Gracias por Nada"	2023	52	13	—	24	20	17	—	24	21	28		Nadie Sabe Lo Que Va a Pasar Mañana
"Teléfono Nuevo" (with Luar la L)	2023	32	8	86	13	8	10	21	11	11	18	PROMUSICAE: Platinum	Nadie Sabe Lo Que Va a Pasar Mañana
"Baby Nueva"	2023	34	9	87	19	16	8	14	10	14	15	PROMUSICAE: Gold	Nadie Sabe Lo Que Va a Pasar Mañana
"Mercedes Carota" (with Yovngchimi)	2023	57	16	—	—	19	18	—	20	23	35	PROMUSICAE: Gold	Nadie Sabe Lo Que Va a Pasar Mañana
"Los Pits"	2023	61	17	—	—	23	21	—	—	27	41	PROMUSICAE: Gold	Nadie Sabe Lo Que Va a Pasar Mañana
"Vuelve Candy B"	2023	70	20	—	—	—	—	—	—	30	57	PROMUSICAE: Gold	Nadie Sabe Lo Que Va a Pasar Mañana
"Thunder y Lightning" (with Eladio Carrion)	2023	80	23	—	—	18	—	—	—	15	49	PROMUSICAE: Platinum	Nadie Sabe Lo Que Va a Pasar Mañana
"Voy a Llevarte Pa' PR"	2025	14	3	7	2	3	4	13	2	4	8	FIMI: Platinum; PROMUSICAE: 4× Platinum; SNEP: Platinum	Debí Tirar Más Fotos
"Perfumito Nuevo" (with RaiNao)	2025	31	7	29	10	12	9	18	10	9	14	PROMUSICAE: Platinum	Debí Tirar Más Fotos
"Weltita" (with Chuwi)	2025	32	8	8	7	7	7	15	6	7	12	PROMUSICAE: 2× Platinum; SNEP: Gold	Debí Tirar Más Fotos
"Veldá" (with Omar Courtz and Dei V)	2025	23	5	10	4	6	7	17	3	3	9	FIMI: Gold; PROMUSICAE: 5× Platinum; SNEP: Gold	Debí Tirar Más Fotos
"Ketu Tecré"	2025	38	10	39	12	18	13	—	19	14	20	PROMUSICAE: Platinum	Debí Tirar Más Fotos
"Bokete"	2025	42	12	52	20	24	18	—	24	18	28	PROMUSICAE: Platinum	Debí Tirar Más Fotos
"Kloufrens"	2025	40	11	25	8	14	10	25	7	12	18	PROMUSICAE: 2× Platinum	Debí Tirar Más Fotos
"Turista"	2025	45	13	50	18	17	14	—	16	15	24	PROMUSICAE: Platinum	Debí Tirar Más Fotos
"Café con Ron" (with Los Pleneros de la Cresta)	2025	48	14	58	25	—	19	—	—	12	31	FIMI: Gold; PROMUSICAE: 2× Platinum; SNEP: Platinum	Debí Tirar Más Fotos
"Lo Que Le Pasó a Hawaii"	2025	62	19	80	—	—	—	—	—	23	43	PROMUSICAE: Gold; SNEP: Gold	Debí Tirar Más Fotos
"La Mudanza"	2025	51	15	65	—	25	17	—	—	16	34	PROMUSICAE: Platinum; SNEP: Gold	Debí Tirar Más Fotos
"—" denotes a title that was not released or did not chart in that territory.

== Footnotes ==
Notes for albums and songs

Notes for peak chart positions
