= Debí Tirar Más Fotos World Tour =

2025–2026 concert tour by Bad Bunny

- World tour by Bad Bunny
- Promotional poster
- Location: Asia; Europe; North America; Oceania; South America
- Associated album: Debí Tirar Más Fotos
- Start date: November 21, 2025
- End date: August 23, 2026
- No. of shows: 59
- Producer: Live Nation
- Attendance: 3.1 million
- Box office: US$467.5 million
- Website: depuertoricopalmundo.com

Bad Bunny concert chronology
- No Me Quiero Ir de Aquí (2025); Debí Tirar Más Fotos World Tour (2025–2026)

Debí Tirar Más Fotos World Tour was the sixth concert tour by Puerto Rican artist Bad Bunny in support of his sixth solo studio album Debí Tirar Más Fotos (2025). An all-stadium world tour, it began on November 21, 2025, at the Estadio Olímpico Félix Sánchez in Santo Domingo, originally concluding on July 22, 2026, at the King Baudouin Stadium in Brussels. On August 17, 2026, two additional dates were announced, ending the tour at the Hiram Bithorn Stadium in San Juan, Puerto Rico on August 22–23, 2026.

With US$472.2 million in grossing across 57 shows, the Debí Tirar Más Fotos Tour not only became his highest-grossing concert tour, but it also became the highest-grossing concert tour by a male Latin artist, surpassing the previous record of US$424.3 million established by Luis Miguel with 124 shows during the Luis Miguel Tour 2023–24. The tour came close to breaking an all-time record of US$479.2 million established by Shakira with 106 shows during the Las Mujeres Ya No Lloran World Tour from February 2025 to July 2026. It also set the same records based on attendance. With 3.08 million tickets sold, it became the best-selling tour by a male Latin artist, surpassing the previous record of 2.9 million tickets sold established by Luis Miguel from 2023 to 2024. The tour also increased the total concert tour grosses of Bad Bunny to US$1.2 billion, making him the first Latin artist, and first artist who does not perform in English, to earn over one billion in revenues from concert tours.

== Announcements ==
On January 13, 2025, Bad Bunny announced No Me Quiero Ir de Aquí, a 31-date (originally 30-date) concert residency at San Juan's Coliseo de Puerto Rico José Miguel Agrelot to be held between early July to mid-September of the same year, in support of his sixth studio album Debí Tirar Más Fotos (2025). Through a short clip, the rapper hinted a world tour, stating:

Thanks to music and the love you all give me, I've had the privilege of traveling and performing in different parts of the world [...] Before the year is out, I'll tell you the exact [date] I'm going to visit you.

Two white Monobloc chairs that are pictured on the cover of the album appeared in front of multiple venues around the globe on May 4, 2025, arising rumours about the announcement for a new series of concerts. The next day, the tour title was revealed along with 24 initial dates across Latin America, Australia, Japan, and Europe. It is Bad Bunny's second all-stadium tour, after the World's Hottest Tour, which spanned shows through the Americas in 2022. In September 2025, he stated that the decision of not including any tour dates in the US was due to concerns over anti-immigration raids executed by ICE.

Due to high demand, one additional date in Lima, São Paulo, Sydney, Barcelona, Lisbon, Düsseldorf, Arnhem, London, Paris, and Milan, as well as two additional Medellín dates and eight extra Madrid dates, were announced by May 9, causing the total show count to nearly double, to 45. During the week of May 12, twelve more shows were added, including a second date in San José, two extra shows in each Santiago and Buenos Aires, and six additional dates in Mexico City. To accommodate the preparation of his performance at the Super Bowl LX halftime show on February 8, 2026, the concerts in Santiago and Lima were rescheduled from their original dates to mid-January.

On November 29, 2025, it was announced that the shows in Mexico City would feature the B-stage from the No Me Quiero Ir de Aquí concert residency, popularly nicknamed "La Casita", which was modeled after a traditional rural Puerto Rican house, commonly constructed from concrete bricks and galvanized steel, resembling the house featured in the short film for Debí Tirar Más Fotos, with new concert sections called "Los Vecinos" (transl. The Neighbors). On February 17, 2026, an exclusive concert slated for March 7 in Tokyo was revealed as part of Spotify's Billions Club Live series, after being teased and included in the itinerary for the tour as far back as May 2025.

In June 2026, reports emerged suggesting Bad Bunny could conclude the tour with a homecoming run in Puerto Rico. According to the mayor of San Juan, Miguel Romero, Rimas Entertainment had reserved several dates in mid-to-late August 2026 at the renovated Hiram Bithorn Stadium, where he has previously performed, "for an artist that has not been revealed". A source cited by El Nuevo Día and familiar with the stadium's operations later indicated the reservation was for Bad Bunny, with another source close to the artist's team stating the booking comprised three dates for the end of August. Following the closing European dates in July 2026, the tour's official site, depuertoricopalmundo.com, updated its homepage copy to describe exploring "Puerto Rico and beyond with captivating photography and travel stories", a shift from its previous ticketing-focused messaging. On August 17, 2026, after much speculation, the tour was officially announced to take place, and officially concluding, at the Hiram Bithorn Stadium on August 22–23, 2026.

== Commercial performance ==
=== Ticket sales and box score ===
Originally a 24-date tour, it quickly expanded to 57 shows due to overwhelming demand. In just one week, the tour sold over 2.6 million tickets, marking a historic record for any Latin artist. Live Nation compared its dominance in ticket sales to performers such as Coldplay, Michael Jackson, Taylor Swift, or the Rolling Stones. Billboard reported that the eight shows held at Mexico City's Estadio GNP Seguros during December 2025 became the second highest-grossing concert series at a single venue with $86.7 million, surpassing Shakira's 2025 twelve-night engagement at the same venue ($76 million) and placing just behind the ten shows held by Coldplay at Wembley Stadium between August and September 2025 as part of their Music of the Spheres World Tour ($131.4 million). In addition, Bad Bunny broke a monthly Billboard Boxscore record for the biggest reported figures for a tour held in the month of December since the Top Tours chart launched in 2019, while topping the monthly charts for a record-eighth time and breaking out of a long-standing tie with Beyoncé, Coldplay, and Elton John.

The tour's first 12 shows collectively grossed $107 million from 697,000 tickets, surpassing the entire Latin American gross of Bad Bunny's previous World's Hottest Tour ($81.7 million across 22 dates).

=== Venue records ===
List of venue records
Year	Dates	Venue	Region	Description	Ref.
2025	November 21–22	Estadio Olímpico Félix Sánchez	Dominican Republic	Fastest ticket sales for an international act in the Dominican Republic	
2025	December 5–6	Estadio Nacional de Costa Rica	Costa Rica	Fastest ticket sales ever in Costa Rica	
2025	December 10–21	Estadio GNP Seguros	Mexico	First act to schedule eight consecutive shows	
2025	December 10–21	Estadio GNP Seguros	Mexico	Biggest queue in Mexican history	
2025	December 10–21	Estadio GNP Seguros	Mexico	Fastest ticket sales ever in Mexico	
2026	January 23–25	Estadio Atanasio Girardot	Colombia	Fastest ticket sales ever in Colombia	
2026	Feb 28 – March 1	ENGIE Stadium	Australia	First Latin act to sell out two stadiums in Australia	
2026	May 26–27	Estádio da Luz	Portugal	First Latin act to sell out one and two stadiums in Portugal	
2026	May 30 – June 15	Riyadh Air Metropolitano	Spain	First act to schedule four to ten shows on a single tour	
2026	May 30 – June 15	Riyadh Air Metropolitano	Spain	Fastest ticket sales ever in Spain	
2026	May 30 – June 15	Riyadh Air Metropolitano	Spain	Most tickets sold for a single tour in Spanish history	
2026	June 27–28	Tottenham Hotspur Stadium	England	Most tickets sold for a Latin act in British history	
2026	July 1–5	Orange Vélodrome	France	First Latin act to sell out multiple stadiums in France	
2026	July 1–5	Paris La Défense Arena	France	First Latin act to sell out multiple stadiums in France	
2026	July 10–11	Strawberry Arena	Sweden	Most tickets sold for a Latin act in Swedish history	
2026	July 14	PGE Narodowy	Poland	First Latin act to sell out a stadium in Poland	
2026	July 17–18	Ippodromo Snai La Maura	Italy	First Latin act to sell out a stadium in Italy	

== Set list ==
The following set list was obtained from the first concert of the tour held on November 21, 2025, at the Estadio Olímpico Félix Sánchez in Santo Domingo. It does not represent all concerts for the duration of the tour.

1. "La Mudanza"
2. "Callaíta"
3. "Pitorro de Coco"
4. "Weltita"
5. "Turista"
6. "Baile Inolvidable"
7. "Nuevayol"
8. "Veldá"
9. "Tití Me Preguntó"
10. "Neverita"
11. "Si Veo a Tu Mamá"
12. "La Romana"
13. "Voy a Llevarte Pa' PR"
14. "Me Porto Bonito"
15. "No Me Conoce (Remix)"
16. "Bichiyal"
17. "Yo Perreo Sola"
18. "Efecto"
19. "Safaera"
20. "Diles"
21. "Mónaco"
22. Exclusive song
23. "Café Con Ron"
24. "Ábreme Paso"
25. "Ojitos Lindos"
26. "La Canción"
27. "Kloufrens"
28. "Dakiti"
29. "El Apagón"
30. "DTMF"
31. "Eoo"

Guests artists and notes

- During the November 22, 2025 concert in Santo Domingo, Romeo Santos joined on stage to perform "Bokete".
- During the December 6, 2025 concert in San José, Jhayco joined on stage to perform "Dakiti", "No Me Conoce" and "Tarot".
- During the December 11, 2025 concert in Mexico City, Feid joined on stage to perform "Perro Negro" as the surprise exclusive song, in addition to "Classy 101" and "Chorrito Pa Las Ánimas". Meanwhile, Diego Boneta, Renata Notni, and Ana de la Reguera were guest attendees for "La Casita".
- During the December 12, 2025 concert in Mexico City, Manelyk González, Galilea Montijo, and Karol Sevilla were guest attendees for "La Casita".
- During the December 15, 2025 concert in Mexico City, Grupo Frontera joined on stage to perform "Un x100to". Meanwhile, Pentagón Jr. and Jesús Ortíz Paz of Fuerza Regida were guest attendees for "La Casita".
- During the December 16, 2025 concert in Mexico City, Yalitza Aparicio, Yeri Mua, and Samadhi Zendejas were guest attendees for "La Casita".
- During the December 19, 2025 concert in Mexico City, Julieta Venegas joined on stage to perform "Lo Siento BB:/", "Lento" and "Ojitos Lindos". Meanwhile, Danna, Salma Hayek, Latin Mafia, and Santa Fe Klan were guest attendees for "La Casita".
- During the December 20, 2025 concert in Mexico City, Eiza González and Luis Gerardo Méndez were guest attendees for "La Casita".
- During the December 21, 2025 concert in Mexico City, J Balvin joined on stage to perform "La Canción", "Qué Pretendes", "Si Tu Novio Te Deja Sola" and "I Like It". Natanael Cano also joined on stage to perform "Soy el Diablo (Remix)" as the surprise exclusive song.
- During the January 10, 2026 concert in Santiago, Becky G joined on stage to perform "Mayores" as the surprise exclusive song, in addition to "Mamiii".
- During the January 11, 2026 concert in Santiago, Jowell & Randy joined on stage to perform "Safaera", "Fuera del Planeta (Remix)", "Hey Mister", "Bonita", "Dale pal Piso" and "Salgo Pa' La Calle".
- During the January 17, 2026 concert in Lima, Ñengo Flow joined on stage to perform "Safaera", "Que Malo" and "Cuando Me Dira".
- During the January 23, 2026, concert in Medellín, Li Samuet of Bomba Estéreo joined on stage to perform "Ojitos Lindos".
- During the January 24, 2026 concert in Medellín, Arcángel joined on stage to perform their collaborations "Me Acostumbré", "Tú No Vive Así" and "La Jumpa". After singing with Bad Bunny, Arcángel took over the stage for 30 minutes to sing his solo hits, including "Me Prefieres a Mí", "Pa' Que la Pases Bien" and "Por Amar a Ciegas".
- During the January 25, 2026 concert in Medellín, Karol G joined on stage to perform their collaboration "Ahora Me Llama". She also performed "Latina Foreva", and Bunny joined for her hit "Si Antes Te Hubiera Conocido".
- During the February 13, 2026 concert in Buenos Aires, Tini, María Becerra, J Rei, La Joaqui and Bizarrap were guest attendees for "La Casita".
- During the February 14, 2026 concert in Buenos Aires, Khea, Duki and Cazzu joined on stage to perform their remix collaboration "Loca". Mora also joined him to perform their collaboration "Una Vez" as the surprise exclusive song. Guillermo Novellis from La Mosca and Callejero Fino were guest attendees for "La Casita".
- During the February 15, 2026 concert in Buenos Aires, Eladio Carrión joined on stage to perform their collaborations "Coco Chanel", "Kemba Walker" and "Thunder y Lightning". Wanda Nara, Lali Espósito, Nicki Nicole, Luck Ra, Yami Safdie, Tiago PZK and Alejo Igoa were guest attendees for "La Casita".
- During the February 20, 2026 concert in São Paulo, his first-ever presentation in Brazil, José Eduardo Santana, a musician part of the touring band, performed the renowned Brazilian song "Garota de Ipaneme" using the cuatro, Puerto Rico’s national instrument.
- During the February 21, 2026 concert in São Paulo, RaiNao joined on stage to perform their collaboration "Perfumito Nuevo". He also said a few words in honor of legendary salsa musician Willie Colón, who had died earlier in the day.
- During the February 28 and March 1, 2026 concerts in Sydney, his first-ever presentations in Australia, 89,000 people attended in total, marking a new record for ENGIE Stadium.
- During the March 7, 2026 concert in Tokyo, his first-ever presentation in Japan and for invite-only fans, Jowell & Randy joined to perform "Safaera". "Yonaguni" and "MIA" were performed for the first time in the tour. Celebrities in attendance included BLACKPINK’s Lisa and contemporary artist Takashi Murakami. It marked the first Spotify’s Billion Club Live performance in Asia.
- On the May 22, 2025 concert in Barcelona, Bad Gyal joined to perform "Yo Perreo Sola" and later performed her single "Da Me".
- On the June 28, 2026 concert in London, Damon Albarn joined to perform "Tormenta" and "Clint Eastwood" by Gorillaz.
- On the July 14, 2026 concert in Warsaw, "Bichiyal", "La Cancíon" and "Yonaguni" were not played.
- The July 18, 2026 concert in Milan was paused after "NUEVAYoL", and later cancelled altogether due to the weather.

=== Exclusive songs ===
At each concert, Bad Bunny performs a surprise song after "Mónaco", which is "exclusive" to that concert. The track is introduced by an audio message accompanied by a five-to-one countdown on the main stage screen, which states the song "will not be repeated or performed" throughout the tour.

List of 2025 exclusive songs
Date (2025)	City	Country	Song
November 21	Santo Domingo	Dominican Republic	"25/8"
November 22	Santo Domingo	Dominican Republic	"Después de la Playa"
November 22	Santo Domingo	Dominican Republic	"Dema Ga Ge Gi Go Gu"
December 5	San José	Costa Rica	"Caro"
December 6	San José	Costa Rica	"Te Deseo Lo Mejor"
December 10	Mexico City	Mexico	"Chambea"
December 11	Mexico City	Mexico	"Perro Negro"
December 12	Mexico City	Mexico	"Amorfoda"
December 15	Mexico City	Mexico	"Where She Goes"
December 16	Mexico City	Mexico	"Te Mudaste"
December 19	Mexico City	Mexico	"La Corriente"
December 20	Mexico City	Mexico	"Mojabi Ghost"
December 21	Mexico City	Mexico	"Soy el Diablo (Remix)"

List of 2026 exclusive songs
Date (2026)	City	Country	Song
January 9	Santiago	Chile	"Soy Peor"
January 10	Santiago	Chile	"Mayores"
January 11	Santiago	Chile	"Solo de Mí"
January 16	Lima	Peru	"Si Estuviésemos Juntos"
January 17	Lima	Peru	"Booker T"
January 23	Medellín	Colombia	"No Me Quiero Casar"
January 24	Medellín	Colombia	"Tu No Metes Cabra"
January 25	Medellín	Colombia	"A Tu Merced"
February 13	Buenos Aires	Argentina	"Otra Noche en Miami"
February 14	Buenos Aires	Argentina	"Una Vez"
February 15	Buenos Aires	Argentina	"Thunder y Lightning"
February 20	São Paulo	Brazil	"Vete"
February 21	São Paulo	Brazil	"Te Boté (Remix)"
February 28	Sydney	Australia	"Un Preview"
March 1	Sydney	Australia	"Un Ratito"
May 22	Barcelona	Spain	"La Santa"
May 23	Barcelona	Spain	"Triste"
May 26	Lisbon	Portugal	"Estamos Bien"
May 27	Lisbon	Portugal	"Ignorantes"
May 30	Madrid	Spain	"Adivino"
May 31	Madrid	Spain	"Teléfono Nuevo"
June 2	Madrid	Spain	"Fina"
June 3	Madrid	Spain	"Como Antes"
June 6	Madrid	Spain	"Coco Chanel"
June 7	Madrid	Spain	"Dime Si Te Acuerdas"
June 10	Madrid	Spain	"Un Verano Sin Ti"
June 11	Madrid	Spain	"Hibiki"
June 14	Madrid	Spain	"Soltera (Remix)"
June 15	Madrid	Spain	"Columbia"
June 20	Düsseldorf	Germany	"Enséñame a Bailar"
June 21	Düsseldorf	Germany	"Vuelve"
June 23	Arnhem	Netherlands	"La Difícil"
June 24	Arnhem	Netherlands	"200 MPH"
June 27	London	England	"Cybertruck"
June 28	London	England	"Ni Bien Ni Mal"
July 1	Marseille	France	"Explicale"
July 4	Paris	France	"Vou 787"
July 5	Paris	France	"Como un Bebe"
July 10	Stockholm	Sweden	"Mr. October"
July 11	Stockholm	Sweden	"Agosto"
July 14	Warsaw	Poland	"La Zona"
July 17	Milan	Italy	"Soliá"
July 22	Brussels	Belgium	"Un Coco"
August 22	San Juan	Puerto Rico	"Ser Bichote"
August 22	San Juan	Puerto Rico	"Vuelve Candy B"
August 23	San Juan	Puerto Rico	"RLNDT"
August 23	San Juan	Puerto Rico	"120"

== Tour dates ==
List of 2025 concerts
Date (2025)	City	Country	Venue	Attendance	Revenue
November 21	Santo Domingo	Dominican Republic	Estadio Olímpico Félix Sánchez	64,175 / 64,175	$7,915,657
November 22	Santo Domingo	Dominican Republic	Estadio Olímpico Félix Sánchez	64,175 / 64,175	$7,915,657
December 5	San José	Costa Rica	Estadio Nacional	115,485 / 115,485	$12,428,000
December 6	San José	Costa Rica	Estadio Nacional	115,485 / 115,485	$12,428,000
December 10	Mexico City	Mexico	Estadio GNP Seguros	517,736 / 517,736	$88,049,427
December 11	Mexico City	Mexico	Estadio GNP Seguros	517,736 / 517,736	$88,049,427
December 12	Mexico City	Mexico	Estadio GNP Seguros	517,736 / 517,736	$88,049,427
December 15	Mexico City	Mexico	Estadio GNP Seguros	517,736 / 517,736	$88,049,427
December 16	Mexico City	Mexico	Estadio GNP Seguros	517,736 / 517,736	$88,049,427
December 19	Mexico City	Mexico	Estadio GNP Seguros	517,736 / 517,736	$88,049,427
December 20	Mexico City	Mexico	Estadio GNP Seguros	517,736 / 517,736	$88,049,427
December 21	Mexico City	Mexico	Estadio GNP Seguros	517,736 / 517,736	$88,049,427

List of 2026 concerts
Date (2026)	City	Country	Venue	Attendance	Revenue
January 9 (Note: The concerts in Santiago on January 9, 10 and 11, 2026, were originally scheduled on February 5, 6 and 7, respectively, but were rescheduled due to Bad Bunny's participation in the Super Bowl LX halftime show.)	Santiago	Chile	Estadio Nacional	169,461 / 169,461	$20,316,611
January 10	Santiago	Chile	Estadio Nacional	169,461 / 169,461	$20,316,611
January 11	Santiago	Chile	Estadio Nacional	169,461 / 169,461	$20,316,611
January 16 (Note: The concerts in Lima on January 16 and 17, 2026, were originally scheduled on January 30 and 31, respectively, but were rescheduled due to Bad Bunny's participation in the Super Bowl LX halftime show.)	Lima	Peru	Estadio Nacional	93,612 / 93,612	$17,079,397
January 17	Lima	Peru	Estadio Nacional	93,612 / 93,612	$17,079,397
January 23	Medellín	Colombia	Estadio Atanasio Girardot	145,487 / 145,487	$25,067,044
January 24	Medellín	Colombia	Estadio Atanasio Girardot	145,487 / 145,487	$25,067,044
January 25	Medellín	Colombia	Estadio Atanasio Girardot	145,487 / 145,487	$25,067,044
February 13	Buenos Aires	Argentina	Estadio Monumental	203,745 / 203,745	$33,522,055
February 14	Buenos Aires	Argentina	Estadio Monumental	203,745 / 203,745	$33,522,055
February 15	Buenos Aires	Argentina	Estadio Monumental	203,745 / 203,745	$33,522,055
February 20	São Paulo	Brazil	Allianz Parque	96,941 / 96,941	$11,955,620
February 21	São Paulo	Brazil	Allianz Parque	96,941 / 96,941	$11,955,620
February 28	Sydney	Australia	ENGIE Stadium	90,093 / 90,093	$14,007,433
March 1	Sydney	Australia	ENGIE Stadium	90,093 / 90,093	$14,007,433
March 7 (Note: The concert in Tokyo on March 7, 2026, is an exclusive show as a part of Spotify's Billions Club Live series.)	Tokyo	Japan	Tipstar Dome Chiba	—N/a	
May 22	Barcelona	Spain	Estadi Olímpic Lluís Companys	116,291 / 116,291	$18,338,838
May 23	Barcelona	Spain	Estadi Olímpic Lluís Companys	116,291 / 116,291	$18,338,838
May 26	Lisbon	Portugal	Estádio da Luz	122,062 / 122,062	$15,229,930
May 27	Lisbon	Portugal	Estádio da Luz	122,062 / 122,062	$15,229,930
May 30	Madrid	Spain	Riyadh Air Metropolitano Stadium	622,613 / 622,613	$96,064,246
May 31	Madrid	Spain	Riyadh Air Metropolitano Stadium	622,613 / 622,613	$96,064,246
June 2	Madrid	Spain	Riyadh Air Metropolitano Stadium	622,613 / 622,613	$96,064,246
June 3	Madrid	Spain	Riyadh Air Metropolitano Stadium	622,613 / 622,613	$96,064,246
June 6	Madrid	Spain	Riyadh Air Metropolitano Stadium	622,613 / 622,613	$96,064,246
June 7	Madrid	Spain	Riyadh Air Metropolitano Stadium	622,613 / 622,613	$96,064,246
June 10	Madrid	Spain	Riyadh Air Metropolitano Stadium	622,613 / 622,613	$96,064,246
June 11	Madrid	Spain	Riyadh Air Metropolitano Stadium	622,613 / 622,613	$96,064,246
June 14	Madrid	Spain	Riyadh Air Metropolitano Stadium	622,613 / 622,613	$96,064,246
June 15	Madrid	Spain	Riyadh Air Metropolitano Stadium	622,613 / 622,613	$96,064,246
June 20	Düsseldorf	Germany	Merkur Spiel-Arena	105,186 / 105,186	$14,682,713
June 21	Düsseldorf	Germany	Merkur Spiel-Arena	105,186 / 105,186	$14,682,713
June 23	Arnhem	Netherlands	GelreDome	65,751 / 65,751	$11,102,843
June 24	Arnhem	Netherlands	GelreDome	65,751 / 65,751	$11,102,843
June 27	London	England	Tottenham Hotspur Stadium	104,128 / 104,128	$20,064,652
June 28	London	England	Tottenham Hotspur Stadium	104,128 / 104,128	$20,064,652
July 1	Marseille	France	Orange Vélodrome	62,178 / 62,178	$8,882,712
July 4	Nanterre (Note: Labeled as Paris in promotional material.)	France	Plenitude Arena	83,908 / 83,908	$14,947,783
July 5	Nanterre	France	Plenitude Arena	83,908 / 83,908	$14,947,783
July 10	Stockholm	Sweden	Strawberry Arena	101,996 / 101,996	$13,657,977
July 11	Stockholm	Sweden	Strawberry Arena	101,996 / 101,996	$13,657,977
July 14	Warsaw	Poland	PGE Narodowy	63,326 / 63,326	$8,420,702
July 17	Milan	Italy	Ippodromo Snai La Maura	77,443 / 77,443	$8,458,205
July 18	Milan	Italy	Ippodromo Snai La Maura	—N/a	
July 22	Brussels	Belgium	King Baudouin Stadium	56,312 / 56,312	$7,280,970
August 22	San Juan	Puerto Rico	Hiram Bithorn Stadium		
August 23	San Juan	Puerto Rico	Hiram Bithorn Stadium		
Total				3,077,929 / 3,077,929 (100%)	$467,472,815

== See also ==
- List of Billboard Boxscore number-one concert series of the 2020s
- List of highest-grossing concert series at a single venue
- List of highest-grossing concert tours by Latin artists
- List of most-attended concert series at a single venue
