= AM (song) =

2021 song bu Nio García feat. Flow La Movie

Single by Nio García and Flow La Movie
- Language: Spanish
- Released: January 28, 2021
- Genre: Reggaeton
- Length: 3:02
- Label: Flow La Movie
- Songwriters: José Ángel Hernández; Luis Antonio Quiñones García
- Producer: Flow La Movie

Nio García singles chronology
"Él Si Tú No" (2021)	"AM" (2021)	"Como Llora (The Remix)" (2021)

Music video
- "AM" on YouTube

"AM (Remix)"

Single by Nio García, J Balvin and Bad Bunny
- Language: Spanish
- Released: June 24, 2021
- Genre: Reggaeton
- Length: 4:21
- Label: Flow La Movie
- Songwriters: Keityn; Angel M. Diaz Ramirez; Benito Antonio Martínez; Camille Marie Soto Malave; Elvin J. Robert Rodriguez; Hozwal Ortiz Velez; José Álvaro Osorio Balvín; José Ángel Hernández; Jose Y. Diaz Medina; Luis Quinones; Xavier Aerizaga Padilla
- Producer: Flow La Movie

Nio García singles chronology
"Dividimos" (2021)	"AM (Remix)" (2021)	"Frontiar" (2021)

J Balvin singles chronology
"Poblado (Remix)" (2021)	"AM (Remix)" (2021)	"In Da Getto" (2021)

Bad Bunny singles chronology
"Yonaguni" (2021)	"AM (Remix)" (2021)	"De Museo" (2021)

Music video
- "AM" (Remix) on YouTube

"AM" is a song by Puerto Rican singer Nio García and Puerto Rican producer Flow La Movie which was originally released on January 28, 2021, through the Flow La Movie label. An official remix with Colombian singer J Balvin and Puerto Rican rapper Bad Bunny was made available worldwide on June 24, 2021 as a standalone single. José Álvaro Osorio Balvín wrote both the original version and its remix version with the production of the two versions by the writer credited as Flow La Movie.

== Background ==
Nio García talks about how the remix version of "AM" featuring J Balvin and Bad Bunny was conceived which hit the charts moderately.

García spoke in an interview regarding the story behind the remix version of the track:

"I have an exquisite and marvelous team. I always try to create a cool ambiance,” Nio Garcia told Billboard during a Live Q&A on Instagram. “We created many songs at the same time but I focused on this one because I knew it was going to be a hit."

Produced by Flow La Movie, Xound, Botlok and Yama, “AM” marked the first single released by García of 2021. It’s a saucy reggaeton track that cleverly counts from one to 12 to describe everything he wants to do to a girl.

== Commercial performance ==
The remix version of "AM" was a commercial success as it charted at number 6 in Spain and stayed there for 32 weeks. Also, it charted at number 41, 4, 6, 13, 22, 20, and 21 on the Billboard Hot 100, Hot Latin Songs, Argentina Hot 100, Bolivia, Colombia, Ecuador and Peru, respectively.

== Music video ==
The music video for remix of "AM" was released on July 9, 2021 on Mora's YouTube channel.

== Charts ==
=== Weekly charts ===
Chart performance for "AM (Remix)"
Chart (2021–2022)	Peak position
Argentina Hot 100 (Billboard)	6
Bolivia (Billboard)	13
Colombia (Billboard)	22
Ecuador (Billboard)	20
Global 200 (Billboard)	10
Mexico (Billboard)	21
Peru (Billboard)	21
Spain (Promusicae)	6
US Billboard Hot 100	41
US Hot Latin Songs (Billboard)	4
US Latin Rhythm Airplay (Billboard)	9

=== Year-end charts ===
Chart (2021)	Position
Global 200 (Billboard)	57
Spain (PROMUSICAE)	33
US Hot Latin Songs (Billboard)	11

== Certifications ==
Certifications and sales for "AM"
Region	Certification	Certified units/sales
Spain (Promusicae) Remix	3× Platinum	120,000^{‡}
United States (RIAA)	7× Platinum (Latin)	420,000^{‡}
United States (RIAA) Remix	2× Diamond (Latin)	1,200,000^{‡}
^{‡} Sales+streaming figures based on certification alone.

== Release history ==
Region	Date	Format	Version	Label(s)	Ref.
Various	January 28, 2021	Digital download; streaming	Original	Flow La Movie	
Various	June 24, 2021	Digital download; streaming	Remix version	Flow La Movie	
