= 200 MPH (song) =

2018 single by Bad Bunny

Single by Bad Bunny featuring Diplo

from the album X 100pre
- Language: Spanish
- Released: December 24, 2018
- Genre: Latin trap
- Length: 2:51
- Label: Rimas; OVO; Warner Bros.
- Songwriter: Benito Martinez
- Producers: Diplo; La Paciencia

Bad Bunny singles chronology
"La Romana" (2018)	"200 MPH" (2018)	"Ni Bien Ni Mal" (2018)

Music video
- "200 MPH" on YouTube

"200 MPH" is a song by Puerto Rican rapper Bad Bunny featuring American DJ Diplo. The song was released through Rimas Entertainment on December 24, 2018 as the seventh single from his debut studio album, X 100pre (2018).

== Music video ==
The video for "200 MPH" was released on April 27, 2019 on Bad Bunny's YouTube channel. As of June 2019, the music video for the song has received over 20 million views.

== Charts ==
=== Weekly charts ===
Chart (2018–19)	Peak position
Spain (Promusicae)	95
US Hot Latin Songs (Billboard)	21

=== Year-end charts ===
Chart (2019)	Position
US Hot Latin Songs (Billboard)	70

== Certifications ==
Region	Certification	Certified units/sales
Spain (Promusicae)	Gold	30,000^{‡}
United States (RIAA)	12× Platinum (Latin)	720,000^{‡}
^{‡} Sales+streaming figures based on certification alone.
