= Limitless (Jennifer Lopez song) =

2018 song

Single by Jennifer Lopez
- Released: November 16, 2018
- Genre: Pop
- Length: 4:07
- Label: STX
- Songwriter(s): Sia Furler; Jesse Shatkin
- Producer(s): Jesse Shatkin

Jennifer Lopez singles chronology
"Te Guste" (2018)	"Limitless" (2018)	"Te Boté II" (2018)

Music video
- "Limitless" on YouTube

"Limitless" is a song recorded by American singer Jennifer Lopez for the soundtrack of her romantic comedy film, Second Act (2018). It was released as a single on November 16, 2018. The video was released on YouTube on December 20, 2018.

== Composition ==
"Limitless" is a power ballad produced by Jesse Shatkin, who co-wrote the song with Sia. Over a piano and drums, Lopez sings about perseverance, stating in the chorus: "I'd given up on the saying ‘I’ll never give up’/ But look at me now/ Yeah, look at me, I'm limitless."

== Live performances ==
Lopez performed the song on multiple occasions since its release.

She debuted the song with a performance at the American Music Awards on October 9, 2018. It opened with a voiceover that stated: "The only thing stopping you is you", which was followed by a poem by Jasmin Kaur. Lopez wore diamond-encrusted shoes, a jumpsuit and matching blazer. Lyndsey Havens of Billboard described the performance as "soaring and impactful".

On November 29, 2018, Lopez performed the song on The Ellen DeGeneres Show.

Lopez performed the song again on NBC's New Years Eve 2019 Television Special Live from Citi Walk in Los Angeles, "The Latina diva wore her hair in a sleek, high ponytail while sporting some glitzy eye makeup and bright red lips. JLo was all smiles as she was flanked by several dancers who wore the same sexy outfit, braving the cold of the Big Apple in order to put on a memorable NYE show for all those ringing in the new year together in the historic location."

The song was also featured on the setlist to her It's My Party tour where she performed the song as a duet with her daughter Emme.

== Music video ==
Lopez directed the music video for "Limitless", her first time directing. The video was released on December 20, 2018, and features her daughter Emme.

== Charts ==
Chart (2019)	Peak position
Belgium (Ultratip Bubbling Under Wallonia)	4

== Release history ==
Release dates and formats for "Limitless"
Region	Date	Format	Label	Ref.
United States	November 16, 2018	Digital download; streaming	STX; Sony	
Italy	December 7, 2018	Contemporary hit radio	Sony	
Australia	January 11, 2019	Contemporary hit radio	Sony	
