= List of Billboard Latin Rhythm Albums number ones of 2019 =

The Latin Rhythm Albums chart is a music chart published in Billboard magazine. The data is compiled by Nielsen SoundScan from a sample that includes music stores, music departments at electronics and department stores, internet sales (both physical and digital) and verifiable sales from concert venues in the United States. The chart is composed of studio, live, and compilation releases by Latin artists performing in the Latin hip hop, urban, dance and reggaeton, the most popular Latin Rhythm music genres.

== Albums ==
| Chart date | Album | Artist(s) | Reference |
|---|---|---|---|
| January 5 | X 100pre | Bad Bunny | |
| January 12 | X 100pre | Bad Bunny | |
| January 19 | X 100pre | Bad Bunny | |
| January 26 | X 100pre | Bad Bunny | |
| February 2 | X 100pre | Bad Bunny | |
| February 9 | X 100pre | Bad Bunny | |
| February 16 | X 100pre | Bad Bunny | |
| February 23 | X 100pre | Bad Bunny | |
| March 2 | X 100pre | Bad Bunny | |
| March 9 | X 100pre | Bad Bunny | |
| March 16 | X 100pre | Bad Bunny | |
| March 23 | X 100pre | Bad Bunny | |
| March 30 | X 100pre | Bad Bunny | |
| April 6 | X 100pre | Bad Bunny | |
| April 13 | X 100pre | Bad Bunny | |
| April 20 | X 100pre | Bad Bunny | |
| April 27 | X 100pre | Bad Bunny | |
| May 4 | X 100pre | Bad Bunny | |
| May 11 | X 100pre | Bad Bunny | |
| May 18 | X 100pre | Bad Bunny | |
| May 25 | X 100pre | Bad Bunny | |
| June 1 | 11:11 | Maluma | |
| June 8 | X 100pre | Bad Bunny | |
| June 15 | X 100pre | Bad Bunny | |
| June 22 | X 100pre | Bad Bunny | |
| June 29 | X 100pre | Bad Bunny | |
| July 6 | X 100pre | Bad Bunny | |
| July 13 | Oasis | J Balvin & Bad Bunny | |
| July 20 | Oasis | J Balvin & Bad Bunny | |
| July 27 | Oasis | J Balvin & Bad Bunny | |
| August 3 | Oasis | J Balvin & Bad Bunny | |
| August 10 | Oasis | J Balvin & Bad Bunny | |
| August 17 | Oasis | J Balvin & Bad Bunny | |
| August 24 | X 100pre | Bad Bunny | |
| August 31 | X 100pre | Bad Bunny | |
| September 7 | Oasis | J Balvin & Bad Bunny | |
| September 14 | Oasis | J Balvin & Bad Bunny | |
| September 21 | X 100pre | Bad Bunny | |
| September 28 | X 100pre | Bad Bunny | |
| October 5 | X 100pre | Bad Bunny | |
| October 12 | X 100pre | Bad Bunny | |
| October 19 | X 100pre | Bad Bunny | |
| October 26 | X 100pre | Bad Bunny | |
| November 2 | X 100pre | Bad Bunny | |
| November 9 | X 100pre | Bad Bunny | |
| November 16 | X 100pre | Bad Bunny | |
| November 23 | X 100pre | Bad Bunny | |
| November 30 | X 100pre | Bad Bunny | |
| December 7 | X 100pre | Bad Bunny | |
| December 14 | Nibiru | Ozuna | |
| December 21 | X 100pre | Bad Bunny | |
| December 28 | X 100pre | Bad Bunny | |
