= Flow La Movie =

Puerto Rican music producer (1985–2021)

- Born: José Ángel Hernández; August 1, 1985; San Juan, Puerto Rico
- Died: December 15, 2021 (aged 36); Santo Domingo, Dominican Republic
- Occupation: Music producer
- Years active: 2011–2021
- Children: 3

José Ángel Hernández (August 1, 1985 – December 15, 2021), known as Flow La Movie, was a Puerto Rican music producer.

== Career ==
He started his career in the music industry as a producer in 2011, which lasted ten years until his death. He launched his own indie record label and management agency and was a producer and artist with chart-topping hits like "Te Boté”, which topped Hot Latin Songs for fourteen weeks, the third-most for Bad Bunny, per Billboard. He was also a producer for Ozuna and Nio García, being behind the latter's viral hit “La Jeepeta".

== Other ventures ==
=== Flow La Movie ===
Flow La Movie
- Founded: 2009
- Founder: Jose Ángel Hernández (Former CEO); Illianes Ruiz (Current CEO)
- Status: Active
- Distributor: The Orchard
- Genre: Reggaeton
- Country of origin: United States
- Location: Orlando, Florida (2009–present)

Hernández founded his record label Flow La Movie (FLM) in 2009 in partnership with his mother and current CEO Illianes Ruiz, while working with Nio García and Casper Mágico. Since founding the label he did reach the top Latin RIAA Certified récord in history with “Te Bote”.

Current artists

| Act | Year signed |
|---|---|
| Nio García (Artist) | 2009 |
| Xound (Producer) | 2018 |

Former artists

Act
Casper Mágico
D.OZi

Album releases

- 2020: Now o Never by Nio García & Casper Mágico

=== Record production ===
Hernández also produces records, including his own, in December 2017, Hernández produced the single “Te Bote” which went certified Dianond by the RIAA.

== Death ==
Hernández died on December 15, 2021, at the age of 36, when a charter plane Gulfstream IV carrying him and eight other people crashed and burst into flames while attempting an emergency landing near Las Américas International Airport. All the other people on board were also killed during the crash, including his wife and their 4-year-old son.
