= Madura (song) =

2018 single by Cosculluela

Single by Cosculluela featuring Bad Bunny
- Language: Spanish
- Released: April 13, 2018
- Genre: Reggaeton
- Length: 3:10
- Label: Warner Music Latina
- Songwriter: José Fernando Cosculluela
- Producers: Alex Killer; DJ Luian; Hydro; Lennex; José Fernando Cosculluela; Mambo Kings; Mueka el cebero

Cosculluela singles chronology
"Palos y Cortas" (2018)	"Madura" (2018)	"Solo a Solas" (2018)

Bad Bunny singles chronology
"Te Boté (Remix)" (2018)	"Madura" (2018)	"Estamos Clear" (2018)

Music video
- "Madura" on YouTube

"Madura" (English: "Mature") is a song by Puerto Rican rapper Cosculluela featuring guest vocals from fellow Puerto Rican rapper Bad Bunny, which was released on April 13, 2018 through Warner Music Latina. The song was both written and produced by José Fernando Cosculluela along with the other producers namely Alex Killer, DJ Luian, Hydro, Lennex and Mambo Kings.

== Commercial performance ==
On the Hot Latin Songs, "Madura" peaked at number 14 and stayed there for 23 weeks. Also, the song charted at 44 and 9 in Argentina and Spain, respectively.

== Music video ==
A music video for "Madura" was released on April 7, 2018 on YouTube.

== Charts ==
=== Weekly charts ===
Chart performance for "Madura"
Chart (2018)	Peak position
Argentina Hot 100 (Billboard)	86
Spain (Promusicae)	9
US Bubbling Under Hot 100 (Billboard)	4
US Hot Latin Songs (Billboard)	14

=== Year-end charts ===
Chart (2018)	Position
US Hot Latin Songs (Billboard)	37

== Certifications ==
Certifications and sales for "Madura"
Region	Certification	Certified units/sales
Spain (Promusicae)	4× Platinum	400,000^{‡}
United States (RIAA)	Platinum (Latin)	60,000^{‡}
^{‡} Sales+streaming figures based on certification alone.
