= Te Guste =

Single by Jennifer Lopez and Bad Bunny
- Language: Spanish
- English title: "You Liked Me"
- Released: November 9, 2018
- Genre: Latin trap
- Length: 3:42
- Label: G2; Sony Latin
- Songwriters: Jennifer Lopez; Xavier Semper; Edgar Semper; Luian Malavé; Benito Antonio Martínez Ocasio; Edgar Andino; Noah Assad; Juan Frias; Héctor Ramos; Armando Lozano
- Producers: DJ Luian; Mambo Kingz; Hydro

Jennifer Lopez singles chronology
"Dinero" (2018)	"Te Guste" (2018)	"Limitless" (2018)

Bad Bunny singles chronology
"Mia" (2018)	"Te Guste" (2018)	"Solo de Mí" (2018)

Music video
- "Te Guste" on YouTube

"Te Guste" (transl. "You Liked Me"} is a song by American singer Jennifer Lopez and Puerto Rican rapper Bad Bunny, released as a single on November 9, 2018. It was written by Lopez, Benito Antonio Martínez Ocasio (Bad Bunny), Xavier Semper and Edgar Semper (collectively known as Mambo Kingz), Luian Malavé (DJ Luian), Edgar Andino, Noah Assad, Juan Frias, Héctor Ramos and Armando Lozano.

== Background and composition ==
On working with Lopez, Bad Bunny revealed: "I barely said a word to her because I was so nervous. I felt the pressure." He added: "She's a total professional, a diva, a mega-star, not just in music but in the entertainment industry. You always learn from the greats, and J.Lo is one." The Fader called the track "reggaetón" and a "long-awaited" collaboration. According to Suzette Fernandez of Billboard, the song's lyrics feature an exchange "when a couple meet for the first time, like each other and are remembering that moment."

== Critical reception ==
Jeff Benjamin of Forbes noted that the song "lets J.Lo hone in on [sic] her musical chameleon style and deliver on a trap-y cut, while Bad Bunny can shine in the sound that made him a star. Plus, with Bad's recent hot streak and his two aforementioned hits, this collaboration is mutually beneficial to both parties who want to further up their already impressive weight in the Latin-pop world and continuously prove their superstardom." NPR's Stefanie Fernández was receptive of the song, stating: "None of it feels like she's trying too hard; she has earned this [...] It would seem that if everything Bad Bunny has touched this year has turned to gold, JLo has the power to make it stay." Rolling Stone writer Brittany Spanos described "Te Guste" as a "trap-pop gamechanger" and a "rom-com of a duet".

== Music video ==
The song's accompanying music video, directed by Mike Ho, was called "vacation-themed" and "warm-toned and tropical" by Billboard. In the video, Lopez wears a yellow bikini, among other looks, while Bad Bunny is shown wearing various colorful, patterned shirts. Bad Bunny is seen with actual bunnies (domesticated rabbits) hopping at his feet while he sings.

== Promotion ==
Lopez revealed she had collaborated with Bad Bunny in October 2018, and shared a trailer for the music video they shot together for the song in November.

== Charts ==
=== Weekly charts ===
Chart (2018)	Peak position
Dominican Republic (Monitor Latino)	17
Puerto Rico (Monitor Latino)	7
Spain (PROMUSICAE)	52
US Digital Song Sales (Billboard)	46
US Hot Latin Songs (Billboard)	12
US Latin Airplay (Billboard)	36
Venezuela (National-Report)	39

=== Year-end charts ===
Chart (2019)	Position
US Hot Latin Songs (Billboard)	95
