= La Romana (song) =

Single by Bad Bunny featuring El Alfa

Single by Bad Bunny featuring El Alfa

from the album X 100pre
- Released: December 24, 2018
- Recorded: 2018
- Genre: Latin trap; dembow; bachata
- Length: 5:01
- Label: Rimas
- Songwriters: Benito Martinez; Emmanuel Herrera; Chael Betances
- Producers: Bad Bunny; Tainy; La Paciencia; Chael Betances

Bad Bunny singles chronology
"Si Estuviésemos Juntos" (2018)	"La Romana" (2018)	"Callaíta" (2019)

"La Romana" (The Roman Woman) is a song by Puerto Rican rapper Bad Bunny, featuring Dominican rapper El Alfa. It is the sixth single of Bad Bunny's debut studio album X 100pre. The single reached a peak position of 12 on the Billboard Hot Latin Songs chart.

== Music video ==
The music video was released on April 6, 2019. As of November 2020 it has over 190 million views.

== Charts ==
=== Weekly charts ===
Chart (2019)	Peak position
Chile (Top 20)	16
Dominican Republic (Monitor Latino)	18
Nicaragua (Monitor Latino)	4
Puerto Rican Singles Chart	4
Spain (PROMUSICAE)	80
US Hot Latin Songs (Billboard)	12
US Latin Airplay (Billboard)	39
US Latin Rhythm Airplay (Billboard)	21

=== Year-end charts ===
Chart (2019)	Position
US Hot Latin Songs (Billboard)	31

== Certifications ==
Region	Certification	Certified units/sales
Italy (FIMI)	Gold	50,000^{‡}
Spain (Promusicae)	2× Platinum	120,000^{‡}
^{‡} Sales+streaming figures based on certification alone.
