= X 100pre =

2018 studio album by Bad Bunny

Studio album by Bad Bunny
- Released: December 24, 2018
- Recorded: 2018
- Genres: Latin hip-hop; Latin trap; reggaeton; alternative reggaeton; pop rap; conscious rap
- Length: 53:57
- Language: Spanish
- Label: Rimas
- Producers: Tainy; Bad Bunny; Diplo; DJ Luian; Ezequiel Rivera; Henry de la Prida; La Paciencia; Mambo Kingz

Bad Bunny chronology
| X 100pre (2018) | Oasis (2019) |

Singles from X 100pre
- 1. "Estamos Bien" Released: June 28, 2018; 2. "Mía" Released: October 11, 2018; 3. "Solo de Mí" Released: December 14, 2018; 4. "Caro" Released: January 23, 2019; 5. "Si Estuviésemos Juntos" Released: February 14, 2019; 6. "La Romana" Released: April 6, 2019; 7. "200 MPH" Released: April 26, 2019; 8. "Ni Bien Ni Mal" Released: May 4, 2019; 9. "¿Quién Tú Eres?" Released: December 23, 2019

X 100pre (an abbreviation of "Por siempre", Spanish: [poɾ sjempre], meaning "Forever" (Note: In Spanish, x (indicating multiplication) is pronounced 'por' and 100 is pronounced 'cien', sounding like "por siempre".) and stylized in all caps) is the debut studio album by Puerto Rican rapper Bad Bunny. It was released on December 24, 2018 by Rimas Entertainment. It features guest appearances from Diplo, El Alfa and Drake. It was ranked number 41 on Rolling Stone's list of the 100 Best Debuts Albums of All Time and number 447 on the list of the 500 Greatest Albums of All Time.

== Background ==
Bad Bunny embarked on his La Nueva Religión Tour Part I and Part II in 2018, which concluded in September. The tour grossed more than $16 million worldwide.

After releasing various singles during 2018, on December 23 he announced via social media that his debut album would be released at midnight on Christmas Eve.

Following the release of the album, Bad Bunny revealed in an Instagram live video that he was not working under his first label Hear this Music and his previous manager DJ Luian because he was not able to release albums under his previous management.

The album cover design was created by Sergio Vazquez and "inadvertently" gave Bad Bunny the idea for using the "third eye" in many of his future shows.

== Composition ==
X 100pre is primarily a Latin trap and reggaeton album, which also incorporates elements of pop, rock, hip-hop, R&B, bachata, dembow, ballad, acoustic, electronic, house, reggae, dancehall, Andean, tropical, synth-pop, pop-punk, chillwave, and synthwave.

== Singles ==
"Estamos Bien" was the first single to be released, accompanied by a music video on June 28, 2018. On October 18, 2018, he released the single "Mía" featuring Drake, marking Drake's second song in Spanish.

Following the success of "Mía", Bad Bunny released "Solo de Mí" on December 15, 2018. On January 18, 2019, he released the video of "Caro". Ricky Martin sings backing vocals on the track.

The video of "Si Estuviésemos Juntos" followed on February 14, 2019, and the video of "La Romana", featuring Dominican dembow artist El Alfa, was released on April 6, 2019.

== Critical reception ==
Professional ratings
Aggregate scores
| Source | Rating |
|---|---|
| Metacritic | 84/100 |
Review scores
| Source | Rating |
| AllMusic | 4.5/5 stars |
| The Guardian | 4/5 stars |
| HipHopDX | 4.1/5 |
| Pitchfork | 8.2/10 |
| Rolling Stone | 4/5 stars |

At Metacritic, which assigns a normalized rating out of 100 to reviews from mainstream critics, X 100pre received an average score of 84 based on five reviews, indicating "universal acclaim". Alexis Petridis of The Guardian praised Bad Bunny's "off-kilter creativity", opining that Bad Bunny "feels less like part of the current pop landscape than an artist operating slightly adjacent to it. He is separated from the pack as much by a desire to take risks as by his roots." He noted that the record contains a variety of musical genres, including pop punk, Andean music, Dominican dembow and "windswept 80s stadium rock".

== Commercial performance ==
X 100pre debuted at number 29 on the US Billboard 200, and number 1 on both the Top Latin Albums and Latin Rhythm Albums charts with 30,000 album-equivalent units in its first week. In its second week, the album peaked at number 11 on the Billboard 200 with 36,000 album-equivalent units.

== Track listing ==
All tracks were written by Benito Martínez, except where noted. Credits adapted from Universal Music Publishing Group's catalog.

| No. | Title | Writer(s) | Producer(s) | Length |
|---|---|---|---|---|
| 1. | "Ni Bien Ni Mal" | Benito Martínez; Marco Masís; Ricardo Lopez | Tainy; La Paciencia | 3:56 |
| 2. | "200 MPH" (featuring Diplo) | Martínez; Thomas Pentz; Richard Mears IV | Diplo; La Paciencia | 2:51 |
| 3. | "¿Quién Tú Eres?" | | Tainy; La Paciencia; Ric & Thadeus | 2:39 |
| 4. | "Caro" | Martínez; Enrique Martín; Masís | Tainy; La Paciencia | 3:49 |
| 5. | "Tenemos Que Hablar" | Martínez; Masís | Tainy; La Paciencia | 3:45 |
| 6. | "Otra Noche en Miami" | Martínez; Masís | Bad Bunny; Tainy; La Paciencia | 3:53 |
| 7. | "Ser Bichote" | Martínez; Henry de la Prida; Ezequiel Rivera | EZ Made da Beat; Henry de la Prida; La Paciencia | 3:13 |
| 8. | "Si Estuviésemos Juntos" | Martínez; Masís; Camilo Echeverry; Erick Santiago Torres Jara (Tower Beatz); Angelo Jusepy Sr Huaman Pastor | Erick Santiago Torres Jara (Tower Beatz); Tainy; La Paciencia; Marzen G | 2:49 |
| 9. | "Solo de Mí" | Martínez; Masís | Tainy; La Paciencia | 3:18 |
| 10. | "Cuando Perriabas" | Martínez; Masís; Ramón Ayala; Leonardo Paniagua; Roberto Rosado | Tainy; La Paciencia | 3:09 |
| 11. | "La Romana" (featuring El Alfa) | Martínez; Emmanuel Herrera; Masís; Roberto Rosado; Chael Betances; Confesor Rosario | Bad Bunny; Tainy; La Paciencia; Chael | 5:01 |
| 12. | "Como Antes" | Martínez; Masís | Bad Bunny; Tainy; La Paciencia | 3:51 |
| 13. | "RLNDT" | Martínez; Masís; Jesús Nieves | Tainy; La Paciencia | 4:45 |
| 14. | "Estamos Bien" | | Bad Bunny; Tainy; La Paciencia | 3:28 |
| 15. | "Mía" (featuring Drake) | Martínez; Aubrey Graham; Luian Nieves; Edgar Semper-Vargas; Xavier Semper-Vargas; Noah Assad; Max Borghetti; Francis Diaz; Joseph Negrón; Henry Pulman | DJ Luian; Mambo Kingz; Tainy; La Paciencia | 3:30 |
| Total length: | | | | 53:57 |

Notes

- "Ni Bien Ni Mal" and "Mía" are stylized in all caps
- "Caro" features background vocals by Ricky Martin
- "¿Quién Tú Eres?" contains portions and excerpts from Narcos instrumental, written by Ric & Thadeus

== Personnel ==
Credits adapted from Tidal.

- Noah "40" Shebib – mixing (track 15)
- Noel "Gadget" Campbell – mixing (track 15)
- Greg Moffett – mixing assistance (track 15)
- Chris Athens – mastering (track 15)
- David "D.C." Castro – engineering (track 15)
- Lindsay Warner – engineering (track 15)
- Les "Bates" Bateman – engineering (track 15)

== Charts ==
=== Weekly charts ===
| Chart (2019) | Peak position |
|---|---|
| Canadian Albums (Billboard) | 36 |
| Dutch Albums (Album Top 100) | 130 |
| Italian Albums (FIMI) | 64 |
| Spanish Streaming Albums (PROMUSICAE) | 1 |
| Swiss Albums (Schweizer Hitparade) | 72 |
| US Billboard 200 | 11 |
| US Top Latin Albums (Billboard) | 1 |
| US Latin Rhythm Albums (Billboard) | 1 |

| Chart (2026) | Peak position |
|---|---|
| Portuguese Albums (AFP) | 101 |

=== Year-end charts ===
| Chart (2019) | Position |
|---|---|
| US Billboard 200 | 43 |
| US Top Latin Albums (Billboard) | 1 |
| Chart (2020) | Position |
| Spanish Albums (PROMUSICAE) | 36 |
| US Billboard 200 | 103 |
| US Top Latin Albums (Billboard) | 2 |
| Chart (2021) | Position |
| Spanish Albums (PROMUSICAE) | 44 |
| US Billboard 200 | 141 |
| US Top Latin Albums (Billboard) | 3 |
| Chart (2022) | Position |
| US Billboard 200 | 165 |
| US Top Latin Albums (Billboard) | 5 |

== Certifications ==
| Region | Certification | Certified units/sales |
|---|---|---|
| Italy (FIMI) | Platinum | 50,000^{‡} |
| Spain (Promusicae) | Platinum | 40,000^{‡} |
| United States (RIAA) | Diamond (Latin) | 600,000^{‡} |
^{‡} Sales+streaming figures based on certification alone.

== See also ==
- 2018 in Latin music
- List of number-one Billboard Latin Albums from the 2010s
- List of number-one Billboard Latin Albums from the 2020s
- List of number-one Billboard Latin Rhythm Albums of 2019
