= Caro (Bad Bunny song) =

2018 single by Puerto Rican trap musician

Single by Bad Bunny

from the album X 100pre
- Language: Spanish
- English title: "Expensive"
- Released: January 23, 2019
- Genre: Conscious hip hop; pop rap; chillwave
- Length: 3:49
- Label: Rimas; OVO; Warner Bros.
- Songwriters: Benito Martinez; Enrique Martín
- Producers: Tainy; La Paciencia

Bad Bunny singles chronology
| "Solo de Mí" (2018) | "Caro" (2019) | "Si Estuviésemos Juntos" (2019) |

Music video
- "Caro" on YouTube

"Caro" (transl. "Expensive") is a song by Puerto Rican rapper Bad Bunny featuring uncredited vocals from Ricky Martin. It was released on January 23, 2019, through Rimas Entertainment, OVO Sound and Warner Bros. Records, as the fourth single from Bad Bunny's debut studio album X 100pre (2018).

== Music video ==
The video was released on January 23, 2019. The video has over 326 million views on YouTube as of November 2024. The clip begins with Bad Bunny getting a quick manicure, and after a close-up of his nails, at that moment the rapper is replaced by a girl, Puerto Rican model Jazmyne Joy, who looks like him, even with the same haircut. During the video, she acts just like Bad Bunny.

== Charts ==
=== Weekly charts ===
| Chart (2018–19) | Peak position |
|---|---|
| Argentina (Argentina Hot 100) | 64 |
| US Hot Latin Songs (Billboard) | 14 |

=== Year-end charts ===
| Chart (2019) | Position |
|---|---|
| US Hot Latin Songs (Billboard) | 44 |

== Certifications ==
| Region | Certification | Certified units/sales |
|---|---|---|
| Spain (Promusicae) | Platinum | 60,000^{‡} |
^{‡} Sales+streaming figures based on certification alone.
