= A Tu Merced =

Song by Bad Bunny

from the album YHLQMDLG
- Language: Spanish
- Released: February 29, 2020
- Genre: Reggaeton
- Length: 2:55
- Label: Rimas
- Songwriters: Benito Martínez; Henry Delano Aguado; Jose Cruz; Freddy Montalvo; Ezequiel Rivera
- Producers: EZ Made da Beat; Prida; Subelo NEO

Visualizer
- "BAD BUNNY - A TU MERCED [Visualizer]" on YouTube

"A Tu Merced" (English: "At Your Mercy") is a song by Puerto Rican rapper Bad Bunny from his third studio album YHLQMDLG (2020). The song was written by Benito Martínez, Henry Delano Aguado, Jose Cruz, Freddy Montalvo and Ezequiel Rivera with EZ Made da Beat, Prida and Subelo NEO handling the production.

== Promotion and release ==
On February 28, 2020, Bad Bunny announced his third studio album that was revealed to be YHLQMDLG during his performance and guest appearance on The Tonight Show Starring Jimmy Fallon, which was released the following day.

== Commercial performance ==
Following the releasing of YHLQMDLG, "A Tu Merced" charted at number 15 on the US Hot Latin Songs chart upon the issue date of March 14, 2022 while failing to enter the Billboard Hot 100. In Spain, "La Santa" reached at number 32.

== Audio visualizer ==
A visualizer video for the song was uploaded to YouTube on February 29, 2020, along with the other visualizer videos of the songs that appeared on YHLQMDLG.

== Charts ==
Chart performance for "A Tu Merced"
| Chart (2022) | Peak position |
|---|---|
| Bolivia (Billboard) | 20 |
| Chile (Billboard) | 21 |
| Colombia (Billboard) | 21 |
| Ecuador (Billboard) | 10 |
| Global 200 (Billboard) | 152 |
| Mexico (Billboard) | 14 |
| Peru (Billboard) | 13 |
| Spain (PROMUSICAE) | 32 |
| US Hot Latin Songs (Billboard) | 15 |
