= Estamos Bien =

2018 song by Bad Bunny

Single by Bad Bunny

from the album X 100pre
- Language: Spanish
- English title: "We're Good"
- Released: June 28, 2018
- Genre: Latin trap
- Length: 3:28
- Label: Rimas
- Songwriters: Benito Martínez; Ismael Flores
- Producers: Tainy; La Paciencia

Bad Bunny singles chronology
"Te Descuidó" (2018)	"Estamos Bien" (2018)	"Satisfacción" (2018)

Music video
- "Estamos Bien" on YouTube

"Estamos Bien" (transl. "We're Good") is a song by Puerto Rican rapper Bad Bunny. It was released on June 28, 2018, through Rimas Entertainment, as the lead single from his debut studio album X 100pre (2018). It was written by Benito Martínez and Ismael Flores and produced by Tainy and La Paciencia.

== Background ==
Bad Bunny had disappeared from social media for a time when he was overwhelmed with his sudden rise to fame. Views of his videos on YouTube were seven billion in 2018. When his fans wondered how he was, he responded with Estamos Bien, a song saying, "We're good".

Rolling Stone magazine called it "electro-psych bliss". In the song, Bad Bunny describes being okay, and that we are all okay and all of mine are okay. The lyrics mention a huge rainstorm, starting from nothing, and that power has not been restored to his home. He dedicated the song to victims of Hurricane Maria when he made his first appearance on American TV on The Tonight Show Starring Jimmy Fallon saying, "3,000 people died in Hurricane Maria and Donald Trump is in denial." Then, as a clip of Hurricane Maria striking the island played on a screen behind him, he began to sing "estamos bien, todo está bien, no hay nada malo aquí, con o sin billetes de cien, estamos bien" (in English "we're good, everything is good, there's nothing wrong here, with or without hundred dollar bills, we're good.")

== Composition ==
The song "Estamos Bien" is an upbeat and melodic Latin trap song with a dancehall rhythm at the end of the song that goes 120 BPM.

== Music video ==
The video for Estamos Bien was released on June 28, 2018 on Bad Bunny's YouTube channel. By April 2019, the music video for the song had received over 300 million views. In the video, Bad Bunny is seen enjoying his time with friends and paints his fingernails purple and blows them dry, questioning traditional male expectations.

== Charts ==
=== Weekly charts ===
Chart (2018–19)	Peak position
Argentina (Argentina Hot 100)	91
Dominican Republic (Monitor Latino)	13
Puerto Rico (Monitor Latino)	4
Spain (PROMUSICAE)	25
US Hot Latin Songs (Billboard)	9
US Latin Airplay (Billboard)	22
US Latin Rhythm Airplay (Billboard)	14

=== Year-end charts ===
Chart (2018)	Position
Spain (PROMUSICAE)	89
US Hot Latin Songs (Billboard)	32

== Certifications ==
Region	Certification	Certified units/sales
Spain (Promusicae)	2× Platinum	120,000^{‡}
United States (RIAA)	3× Platinum (Latin)	180,000^{‡}
^{‡} Sales+streaming figures based on certification alone.

== Credits and personnel ==
- Bad Bunny – songwriting, lead vocals
- Ismael Flores – songwriting
- Tainy – producer
- La Paciencia – producer

== Release history ==
Region	Date	Format	Label	Ref.
Various	June 28, 2018	Streaming; digital download	Rimas	
