= Soy Peor =

Single by Bad Bunny
- Language: Spanish
- English title: I'm Worse
- Released: December 8, 2016
- Genre: Latin trap
- Length: 4:17
- Label: Rimas
- Songwriters: DJ Luian; Benito Martínez
- Producer: Bad Bunny

Bad Bunny singles chronology
"Dema Ga Ge Gi Go Gu" (2016)	"Soy Peor" (2016)	"Caile" (2016)

Music video
- "Soy Peor" on YouTube

"Soy Peor" (transl. "I'm Worse") is the debut solo single by Puerto Rican rapper Bad Bunny. It was originally released on December 8, 2016, through Rimas Entertainment as a standalone single. The song was written by Bunny and DJ Luian with the former handling the production. The song is credited as the establishment of Bad Bunny as the forerunner in the Latin American trap scene and reached number 19 on the Hot Latin Songs chart. A remix version of the song featuring J Balvin, Ozuna and Arcángel was released on June 22, 2017 with its music video released the following day.

== Commercial performance ==
"Soy Peor" charted at the Hot Latin Songs chart at number 19 upon the issue date of September 2, 2017 and it also charted at number 48 in Spain where it stayed for 39 weeks.

== Music video ==
The music video for "Soy Peor" was uploaded to YouTube on December 31, 2016.

== Charts ==
=== Weekly charts ===
Chart performance for "Soy Peor"
Chart (2017)	Peak position
Spain (PROMUSICAE)	48
US Hot Latin Songs (Billboard)	19

=== Year-end charts ===
Chart (2017)	Position
Spain (PROMUSICAE)	70
US Hot Latin Songs (Billboard)	51

== Certifications ==
Certifications and sales for "Soy Peor"
Region	Certification	Certified units/sales
Italy (FIMI)	Gold	25,000^{‡}
Spain (PROMUSICAE)	2× Platinum	200,000^{‡}
United States (RIAA)	11× Platinum (Latin)	660,000^{‡}
^{‡} Sales+streaming figures based on certification alone.

Certifications and sales for "Soy Peor (Remix)"
Region	Certification	Certified units/sales
United States (RIAA)	Platinum (Latin)	60,000^{‡}
^{‡} Sales+streaming figures based on certification alone.

== Release history ==
Region	Date	Format	Version	Label(s)	Ref.
Various	December 8, 2016	Digital download; streaming	Original	Rimas	
Various	June 22, 2017	Digital download; streaming	Remix version	Rimas	
