= Chambea =

Single by Bad Bunny
- Language: Spanish
- English title: "Work"
- Released: December 1, 2017
- Length: 3:12
- Label: Rimas Entertainment
- Songwriters: Benito Martínez; Joseph Vélez; Xavier A. Semper; Wilmer Semper; Luian Nieves; Noah K. Assad
- Producers: Mambo Kingz; DJ Luian; Alex Killer

Bad Bunny singles chronology
"Sensualidad" (2017)	"Chambea" (2017)	"El Favorito de los Capo (Remix)" (2018)

Music video
- "Chambea" on YouTube

"Chambea" (transl. "Work") is a song by Puerto Rican rapper Bad Bunny. It was released by Rimas Entertainment on December 1, 2017, as a single. The song reached number seven in Spain, while in the United States, it peaked at number twenty-six on Billboard Hot Latin Songs chart.

== Background and release ==
Bad Bunny posted a photo on his social media accounts with former professional wrestler Ric Flair, announcing the release date. Bad Bunny co-wrote the song with Joseph Vélez, Xavier and Wilmer Semper, alongside his producers DJ Luian and Mambo Kingz.

== Music video ==
The accompanying music video for "Chambea" premiered on the same day as the song's release. The video features former professional wrestler Ric Flair, who had announced the song days earlier.

== Charts ==
=== Weekly charts ===
Chart (2017)	Peak position
Spain (Promusicae)	7
US Hot Latin Songs (Billboard)	26

== Certifications ==
Region	Certification	Certified units/sales
Spain (Promusicae)	Gold	20,000^{‡}
United States (RIAA)	3× Platinum (Latin)	180,000^{‡}
^{‡} Sales+streaming figures based on certification alone.

== Release history ==
Region	Date	Format	Label	Ref.
Worldwide	December 1, 2017	Digital download	Rimas Entertainment	
