= Mojabi Ghost =

Song by Tainy and Bad Bunny

from the album Data
- Released: 29 June 2023
- Genre: Synth-pop; electropop; new wave
- Length: 3:52
- Label: Neon16
- Songwriters: Marco Masis; Benito Martinez
- Producer: Tainy

"Mojabi Ghost" (stylized in all caps) is a song by Puerto Rican producer Tainy and Puerto Rican rapper Bad Bunny, from Tainy's debut studio album Data, released as the fifth track on June 29, 2023. The song was written by Tainy and Bad Bunny, and produced by Tainy.

== Charts ==
=== Weekly charts ===
Weekly chart performance for "Mojabi Ghost"
Chart (2023)	Peak position
Bolivia (Billboard)	11
Chile (Billboard)	21
Colombia (Billboard)	15
Ecuador (Billboard)	7
Global 200 (Billboard)	23
Mexico (Billboard)	17
Peru (Billboard)	8
Spain (PROMUSICAE)	14
US Billboard Hot 100	57
US Hot Latin Songs (Billboard)	9

=== Year-end charts ===
2023 year-end chart performance for "Mojabi Ghost"
Chart (2023)	Position
US Hot Latin Songs (Billboard)	63
