= Te Boté =

2017 single by Nio García, Darell and Casper Mágico

Single by Casper Magico, Nio García and Darell
- Language: Spanish
- Released: December 1, 2017
- Genre: Reggaeton
- Length: 4:15
- Label: Flow La Movie
- Songwriter: Flow La Movie
- Producer: Young Martino

Nio García singles chronology
"Volverte A Ver" (2016)	"Te Boté" (2017)	"Estas Aquí (Dance hall version)" (2018)

Darell singles chronology
"Inevitable" (2017)	"Te Boté" (2017)	"Quiere Fumar" (2018)

Casper Mágico singles chronology
"Admitele (Remix)" (2017)	"Te Boté" (2017)	"Blanco o Negro" (2018)

Music video
- "Te Boté" on YouTube

"Te Boté" (English: "I Dumped You") is a song recorded by Puerto Rican rappers Nio García, Darell and Casper Mágico. The song was released by Flow La Movie Inc. as a single on December 1, 2017, for digital download and streaming. On April 13, 2018, a remixed version of "Te Boté" featuring American artist Nicky Jam and Puerto Rican artists Bad Bunny and Ozuna was released as single. An English remix of the song by Conor Maynard featuring Anth was released on May 19, 2018. Another remix entitled "Te Boté II", by Casper Magico, Nio Garcia and Cosculluela, featuring Wisin & Yandel and Jennifer Lopez (as JLo), was released on December 18, 2018.

== Music video ==
The music video for "Te Boté" premiered on November 30, 2017, on Flow La Movie YouTube channel.

== Track listing ==
Digital download
No.	Title	Length
1.	"Te Boté"	4:15

Digital download – Electronic Remixes EP
No.	Title	Length
1.	"Te Boté (Moombahton remix)" (featuring DJ Willie)	2:57
2.	"Te Boté (Kameo & Ritmo Raid remix)" (featuring Kameo & Ritmo Raid)	3:45
3.	"Te Boté (Shermanology remix)" (featuring Shermanology)	3:50
4.	"Te Boté (Kazzanova remix)" (featuring DJ Kazzanova)	2:36

== Charts ==
=== Weekly charts ===
Weekly chart performance
Chart (2018)	Peak position
Bolivia (Monitor Latino)	4
Colombia (Monitor Latino)	2
El Salvador (Monitor Latino)	10
France (SNEP)	54
Italy (FIMI)	11
Netherlands (Single Top 100)	53
Nicaragua (Monitor Latino)	1
Peru (Monitor Latino)	6
Spain (PROMUSICAE)	1
Switzerland (Schweizer Hitparade)	38

=== Year-end charts ===
Annual chart rankings
Chart (2018)	Position
France (SNEP)	176
Italy (FIMI)	31
Switzerland (Schweizer Hitparade)	83
US Streaming Songs (Billboard)	53

== Certifications ==
Region	Certification	Certified units/sales
France (SNEP)	Platinum	200,000^{‡}
Italy (FIMI)	3× Platinum	150,000^{‡}
Spain (Promusicae)	4× Platinum	160,000^{‡}
United States (RIAA)	4× Platinum (Latin)	240,000^{‡}
^{‡} Sales+streaming figures based on certification alone.

== Release history ==
Region	Date	Format	Label	Ref.
Various	December 1, 2017	Digital download	Flow La Movie Inc.	
Various	March 6, 2018	Digital download (Electronic remixes EP)	Flow La Movie Inc.	

== Te Boté (Remix) ==
"Te Boté (Remix)"

Single by Nio García, Darell and Casper Mágico featuring Bad Bunny, Nicky Jam and Ozuna

from the album Now Or Never
- Language: Spanish
- Released: April 13, 2018
- Genre: Reggaeton
- Length: 6:57
- Label: Flow La Movie
- Producers: Young Martino; DJ Nelson; Kronix Magical; Shorty Complete

Bad Bunny singles chronology
"Thinkin" (2018)	"Te Boté (Remix)" (2018)	"Madura" (2018)

Nicky Jam singles chronology
"Déjate Llevar" (2018)	"Te Boté (Remix)" (2018)	"Estas Aquí (Dance hall version)" (2018)

Ozuna singles chronology
"Aprovecha (Remix)" (2018)	"Te Boté (Remix)" (2018)	"Humo y Alcohol (Remix)" (2018)

Music video
- "Te Boté" (Remix) on YouTube

On April 13, 2018, a remix of the song featuring American artist Nicky Jam and Puerto Rican artists Bad Bunny, and Ozuna was made available worldwide as a single. It was produced by Puerto Rican producers Young Martino, DJ Nelson, Kronix Magical, and Shorty Complete.

=== Music video ===
The music video for remix of "Te Boté" premiered on April 11, 2018, on Flow La Movie's YouTube channel. As of May 2026, the video has received over 2.5 billion views.

=== Charts ===
==== Weekly charts ====
Chart (2018)	Peak position
Argentina (Argentina Hot 100)	20
Canada Hot 100 (Billboard)	98
Colombia (National-Report)	10
Hungary (Single Top 40)	34
Sweden Heatseeker (Sverigetopplistan)	9
US Billboard Hot 100	36
US Hot Latin Songs (Billboard)	1
US Latin Airplay (Billboard)	2
US Latin Rhythm Airplay (Billboard)	2

==== Year-end charts ====
Chart (2018)	Position
US Billboard Hot 100	81
US Hot Latin Songs (Billboard)	5
Chart (2019)	Position
US Hot Latin Songs (Billboard)	10

==== Decade-end charts ====
Chart (2010–2019)	Position
US Hot Latin Songs (Billboard)	10

==== All-time charts ====
Chart (2021)	Position
US Hot Latin Songs (Billboard)	26

=== Certifications ===
Region	Certification	Certified units/sales
France (SNEP)	Gold	100,000^{‡}
Spain (Promusicae)	2× Platinum	120,000^{‡}
United Kingdom (BPI)	Silver	200,000^{‡}
United States (RIAA)	106× Platinum (Latin)	6,360,000^{‡}
^{‡} Sales+streaming figures based on certification alone.

=== Release history ===
Region	Date	Format	Label	Ref.
Various	April 13, 2018	Digital download	Flow La Movie Inc.	

== Te Boté II ==
"Te Boté II"

Single by Casper Magico, Nio Garcia and Cosculluela featuring Wisin & Yandel and Jennifer Lopez
- Language: English; Spanish
- Released: December 18, 2018
- Genre: Reggaeton
- Length: 6:53
- Label: Flow La Movie
- Producers: Young Martino; Kronix Magical; Shorty Complete

Jennifer Lopez singles chronology
"Limitless" (2018)	"Te Boté II" (2018)	"Medicine" (2019)

Wisin & Yandel singles chronology
"La Luz" (2018)	"Te Boté II" (2018)	"Aullando" (2019)

Music video
- "Te Boté II" on YouTube

"Te Boté II", by Casper Magico, Nio Garcia and Cosculluela, featuring Wisin & Yandel and Jennifer Lopez (as JLo), was released on December 18, 2018, by Flow La Movie Inc. Lopez sings the first verse in English, with the rest of the remix sung in Spanish.

=== Certifications ===
Region	Certification	Certified units/sales
United States (RIAA)	Platinum (Latin)	60,000^{‡}
^{‡} Sales+streaming figures based on certification alone.

== See also ==
- List of Billboard number-one Latin songs of 2018
