= Solo de Mí =

2018 song by Bad Bunny

Single by Bad Bunny

from the album X 100pre
- Language: Spanish
- English title: "Only of Me"
- Released: December 14, 2018
- Genre: Reggaeton; Latin trap
- Length: 3:18
- Label: Rimas
- Songwriters: Benito Martinez; Ismael Flores
- Producers: Tainy; La Paciencia

Bad Bunny singles chronology
"Te Guste" (2018)	"Solo de Mí" (2018)	"Caro" (2019)

Music video
- "Solo de Mí" on YouTube

"Solo de Mí" (transl. "Only of Me") is a song by Puerto Rican rapper Bad Bunny. It was released on December 14, 2018, through Rimas Entertainment, as the third single from his debut studio album X 100pre (2018). The accompanying music video for the ballad features a woman lip-syncing the song while being physically hit.

== Composition ==
The song "Solo de Mí" is a reggaeton and latin trap song and it has a tempo of 180 BPM.

== Reception ==
The New York Times said Bad Bunny's voice sounds tender when he performs the song. Rolling Stone magazine said the song reflects someone who is "reclaiming herself" after being a victim of domestic violence. NPR noted the video was "part of a campaign against domestic violence".

== Charts ==
=== Weekly charts ===
Chart (2018–19)	Peak position
Argentina (Argentina Hot 100)	66
Spain (PROMUSICAE)	100
US Billboard Hot 100	93
US Hot Latin Songs (Billboard)	6

=== Year-end charts ===
Chart (2019)	Position
US Hot Latin Songs (Billboard)	28

== Certifications ==
Region	Certification	Certified units/sales
Spain (Promusicae)	Platinum	60,000^{‡}
United States (RIAA)	17× Platinum (Latin)	1,020,000^{‡}
^{‡} Sales+streaming figures based on certification alone.
