= Mía (Bad Bunny song) =

2018 single by Bad Bunny featuring Drake

Single by Bad Bunny featuring Drake

from the album X 100pre
- Language: Spanish
- English title: "Mine"
- Released: October 11, 2018
- Genre: Reggaeton
- Length: 3:30
- Label: OVO; Rimas; Warner Bros.
- Songwriters: Benito Martinez; Aubrey Graham; Edgar Semper Vargas; Elvin Peña; Francis Diaz; Henry Pulman; Luian Malave Nieves; Joseph Negron Velez; Max Borghetti; Noah Assad; Xavier Semper Vargas
- Producers: DJ Luian; Mambo Kingz; Tainy; La Paciencia

Bad Bunny singles chronology
"Está Rico" (2018)	"Mía" (2018)	"Te Guste" (2018)

Drake singles chronology
"No Stylist" (2018)	"Mía" (2018)	"Mob Ties" (2019)

Music video
- "Mía" on YouTube

"Mía" (transl. "Mine") is a song by Puerto Rican rapper Bad Bunny featuring Canadian rapper Drake. It was released on October 11, 2018, through OVO Sound, Rimas Entertainment and Warner Bros. Records, as the second single from the former's debut studio album X 100pre (2018). The song was written by the artists along with Edgar Semper Vargas, Elvin Peña, Francis Diaz, Henry Pulman, Luian Malave Nieves, Joseph Negron Velez, Max Borghetti, Noah Assad and Xavier Semper Vargas, and produced by DJ Luian, Tainy, La Paciencia and Mambo Kingz.

"Mía" peaked at number five on the US Billboard Hot 100, becoming Bunny's first top 10 single on the chart as a lead artist and Drake's 26th. The song also topped the charts in Spain, and reached the top 10 in Argentina, Canada, Colombia, El Salvador, Greece, Panama, Portugal, Romania, Switzerland and Venezuela; as well as the top 20 in France, Italy, Sweden and the United Kingdom. The accompanying music video was released alongside the single and passed the billion view mark on March 21, 2020.

== Background ==
On January 25, 2018, Bad Bunny teased the song and posted a snippet on Instagram. Shortly before the release of the song, Drake posted a picture of himself posing on the set of the video. It is the first song on which Drake sings entirely in Spanish.

== Composition ==
According to the sheet music published on Musicnotes.com, "Mía" is composed in the key of F-sharp minor and set in a 4/4 time signature at a tempo of 80 beats per minute.

== Music video ==
The song's accompanying music video was released on October 11, 2018, and was directed by Fernando Lugo.

== Personnel ==
Credits adapted from Tidal.

- Greg Moffett – assistant mixing engineering
- Les Bateman – engineering
- Lindsay Warner – engineering
- David Castro – engineering
- Chris Athens – mastering
- Noah Shebib – mixing
- Noel Campbell – mixing

== Charts ==
=== Weekly charts ===
Chart (2018–2019)	Peak position
Argentina (Argentina Hot 100)	3
Australia (ARIA)	40
Austria (Ö3 Austria Top 40)	26
Belgium (Ultratop 50 Flanders)	49
Belgium (Ultratop 50 Wallonia)	21
Bolivia (Monitor Latino)	3
Brazil (Top 100 Brasil)	89
Canada Hot 100 (Billboard)	3
Chile (Monitor Latino)	14
Colombia (National-Report)	6
Croatia (HRT)	78
Czech Republic Singles Digital (ČNS IFPI)	29
Denmark (Tracklisten)	34
France (SNEP)	14
Germany (GfK)	26
Greece (IFPI)	4
Hungary (Dance Top 40)	19
Hungary (Stream Top 40)	19
Ireland (IRMA)	28
Italy (FIMI)	14
Lithuania (AGATA)	10
Mexico (Billboard Mexican Airplay)	9
Netherlands (Dutch Top 40)	28
Netherlands (Single Top 100)	27
New Zealand Hot Singles (RMNZ)	4
Norway (VG-lista)	29
Panama (Monitor Latino)	2
Portugal (AFP)	3
Puerto Rico (Monitor Latino)	4
Romania (Airplay 100)	2
Singapore (RIAS)	25
Slovakia Singles Digital (ČNS IFPI)	17
Slovenia (SloTop50)	42
Spain (Promusicae)	1
Sweden (Sverigetopplistan)	16
Switzerland (Schweizer Hitparade)	3
UK Singles (Official Charts)	13
US Billboard Hot 100	5
US Dance Club Songs (Billboard)	38
US Hot Latin Songs (Billboard)	1
US Latin Airplay (Billboard)	1
US Pop Airplay (Billboard)	22
US Rhythmic Airplay (Billboard)	1
Venezuela (Monitor Latino)	2

Chart (2026)	Peak position
Global 200 (Billboard)	144

=== Year-end charts ===
Chart (2018)	Position
Portugal (AFP)	78
Spain (PROMUSICAE)	58
Switzerland (Schweizer Hitparade)	94
US Hot Latin Songs (Billboard)	18

Chart (2019)	Rank
Argentina Airplay (Monitor Latino)	22
Canada (Canadian Hot 100)	76
France (SNEP)	62
Hungary (Dance Top 40)	33
Italy (FIMI)	99
Portugal (AFP)	64
Switzerland (Schweizer Hitparade)	73
US Billboard Hot 100	44
US Hot Latin Songs (Billboard)	1
US Latin Airplay (Billboard)	2
US Rhythmic (Billboard)	18
US Rolling Stone Top 100	94

=== Decade-end charts ===
Chart (2010–2019)	Position
US Hot Latin Songs (Billboard)	5

=== All-time charts ===
Chart (2021)	Position
US Hot Latin Songs (Billboard)	17

== Certifications ==
Region	Certification	Certified units/sales
Australia (ARIA)	Platinum	70,000^{‡}
Canada (Music Canada)	3× Platinum	240,000^{‡}
Denmark (IFPI Danmark)	Gold	45,000^{‡}
France (SNEP)	Diamond	333,333^{‡}
Germany (BVMI)	Gold	200,000^{‡}
Italy (FIMI)	2× Platinum	100,000^{‡}
New Zealand (RMNZ)	Platinum	30,000^{‡}
Portugal (AFP)	Platinum	10,000^{‡}
Spain (Promusicae)	3× Platinum	120,000^{‡}
Switzerland (IFPI Switzerland)	Gold	10,000^{‡}
United Kingdom (BPI)	Platinum	600,000^{‡}
United States (RIAA)	96× Platinum (Latin)	5,760,000^{‡}
Streaming
Chile (Profovi)	Diamond	55,000,000
Greece (IFPI Greece)	Platinum	2,000,000^{†}
^{‡} Sales+streaming figures based on certification alone.

== Release history ==
Region	Date	Format	Label	Ref.
Various	October 11, 2018	Streaming; digital download	OVO; Rimas; Warner Bros.	
Italy	October 19, 2018	Contemporary hit radio	Warner	
United States	November 27, 2018	Contemporary hit radio	OVO; Warner Bros.	

== See also ==
- List of number-one singles of 2018 (Spain)
- List of number-one Billboard Hot Latin Songs of 2018
- List of Billboard number-one Latin songs of 2019
- List of Billboard Argentina Hot 100 top-ten singles in 2018
