= Ni Bien Ni Mal =

2018 single by Puerto Rican rapper Bad Bunny

Single by Bad Bunny

from the album X 100pre
- Language: Spanish
- English title: "Neither Good Nor Bad"
- Released: May 4, 2019
- Genre: Latin trap
- Length: 3:56
- Label: Rimas; OVO; Warner Bros.
- Songwriters: Benito Martinez; Junaydee Briceño
- Producers: Tainy; La Paciencia

Bad Bunny singles chronology
"Si Estuviésemos Juntos" (2019)	"Ni Bien Ni Mal" (2019)	"Callaíta" (2019)

Music video
- "Ni Bien Ni Mal" on YouTube

"Ni Bien Ni Mal" (stylized in uppercase; transl. "Neither Good Nor Bad") is a song by Puerto Rican rapper Bad Bunny. The song was released on May 4, 2019, through Rimas Entertainment, as the sixth single from his debut studio album X 100pre (2018). It was written by Benito Martinez and Ismael Flores and produced by Tainy and La Paciencia.

== Composition ==
This is a Latin trap song in which Bad Bunny raps about no longer being affected by a recent breakup, affirming he will move on by not thinking about it or taking action, thus becoming emotionally neutral.

== Music video ==
The music video for "Ni Bien Ni Mal" was released on May 4, 2019. It was directed by Jessy Terrero and stars Bad Bunny and Dominican model Anyelina Sanchez. In the video, Bad Bunny is shown stranded on an island surrounded by pink bunnies and attractive women. The video has over 190 million views on YouTube as of August 2022.

=== Controversy ===
The music video was criticized for the use of bunnies with pink-dyed fur. Fans took to social media to criticize Bad Bunny and express concern over this issue. As a result from these complaints, Jessy Terrero, the director of the video, released a statement on Instagram, as well as his official website, addressing the bunnies in the video. In the statement, Terrero stated that the use of pink bunnies in the video was his idea and not Bad Bunny's, and that he was "solely responsible for not only their use but also their treatment." In addition, he assured fans that the bunnies "were treated ethically and under the care by experts and that I would have never continued with the production if I was not confident that the animals would not be harmed."

== Charts ==
Chart (2018–19)	Peak position
Argentina (Argentina Hot 100)	25
Italy (FIMI)	52
Puerto Rican Singles Chart	7
Spain (PROMUSICAE)	3
US Hot Latin Songs (Billboard)	8

== Certifications ==
Region	Certification	Certified units/sales
Italy (FIMI)	Gold	25,000^{‡}
Spain (Promusicae)	2× Platinum	120,000^{‡}
^{‡} Sales+streaming figures based on certification alone.
