= Si Estuviésemos Juntos =

2018 single by Bad Bunny

Single by Bad Bunny

from the album X 100pre
- Language: Spanish
- English title: "If We Were Together"
- Released: February 14, 2019
- Genre: Reggaeton
- Length: 3:18
- Label: Rimas
- Songwriters: Benito Martinez; Marco Masís; Angelo Huaman; Erick Torres; Camilo Echeverry
- Producers: Tainy; Marzen G; Tower Beatz; La Paciencia

Bad Bunny singles chronology
"Caro" (2019)	"Si Estuviésemos Juntos" (2019)	"Ni Bien Ni Mal" (2019)

Music video
- "Si Estuviésemos Juntos" on YouTube

"Si Estuviésemos Juntos" (transl. "If We Were Together") is a song by Puerto Rican rapper Bad Bunny. The song was released on February 14, 2019, through Rimas Entertainment, as the fifth single from his debut studio album X 100pre (2018). The nostalgic reggaeton song reminisces about a former lover.

== Music video ==
The video was released on February 14, 2019 and it currently has more than 600 million views. The nostalgic song tells the story of the Puerto Rican reggaeton singer reminiscing about a former lover, with the video.

== Charts ==
=== Weekly charts ===
Chart (2018–19)	Peak position
Spain (PROMUSICAE)	100
US Hot Latin Songs (Billboard)	24

Chart (2022)	Peak position
Ecuador (Billboard)	22

Chart (2026)	Peak position
Peru (Billboard)	24

=== Year-end charts ===
Chart (2019)	Position
US Hot Latin Songs (Billboard)	63

== Certifications ==
Region	Certification	Certified units/sales
Spain (Promusicae)	3× Platinum	180,000^{‡}
^{‡} Sales+streaming figures based on certification alone.
