= Callaíta =

2019 single by Bad Bunny and Tainy

Single by Bad Bunny and Tainy
- Language: Spanish
- English title: "Quiet"
- Released: May 31, 2019
- Genre: Reggaeton; alternative reggaeton
- Length: 4:11
- Label: Rimas
- Songwriters: Benito Martinez; Marco Masis; Francisco Saldaña; Victor Cabrera; Félix Ortiz
- Producer: Tainy

Bad Bunny singles chronology
"Ni Bien Ni Mal" (2019)	"Callaíta" (2019)	"Soltera (remix)" (2019)

Music video
- "Callaíta" on YouTube

"Callaíta" (transl. "Quiet") is a song by Puerto Rican rapper Bad Bunny and producer Tainy with samples from Zion's song "Alócate". The song was released on May 31, 2019, through Rimas Entertainment, as a standalone single. It was later included on Bad Bunny's fourth studio album Un Verano Sin Ti (2022).

== Background and release ==
In the days prior to its release, Bad Bunny shared several snippets of “Callaíta” on his Instagram page. In a live recording from his iPhone, he called it "My favorite song!!!!!!!" On May 29, he posted another broadcast where he played about 30 seconds of the song from inside a Lamborghini parked along the Puerto Rican seaside, captioned "I don’t know when to release it." On May 31, Bad Bunny covertly self-released "Callaíta" at midnight as a standalone single. The song was later included as the final song on the tracklist of his fourth studio album Un Verano Sin Ti, which was released on May 6, 2022.

== Music and lyrics ==
"Callaíta" is a reggaeton song produced by Tainy. The production evokes the beach with sounds of crashing waves, distant seagull cries and echoes of a steam organ, creating a "spellbinding collage-turned-reggaeton lullaby." Lyrically, it is about an introverted girl who likes to party hard and live life to the fullest. Generally shy and unassuming, after a few drinks she unleashes her wild side. In the chorus, Bad Bunny sings "She’s quiet, but she’s daring for sex, I know / Marijuana and drinks, enjoying life how it is."

== Music video ==
The video was released on May 31, 2019, and it was directed by Kacho López Mari and produced by Puerto Rican production company, Filmes Zapatero. In it, Bunny talks about a girl who, despite seemingly meek and quiet, lives a life free of inhibitions and hesitations, both in terms of herself and of people who criticize her.

== Charts ==
=== Weekly charts ===
2019 weekly chart performance for "Callaíta"
Chart (2019)	Peak position
Argentina (Argentina Hot 100)	9
Bolivia (Monitor Latino)	13
Colombia (Monitor Latino)	10
Dominican Republic (Monitor Latino)	1
Ecuador (Monitor Latino)	11
France (SNEP)	140
Honduras (Monitor Latino)	3
Italy (FIMI)	50
Nicaragua (Monitor Latino)	3
Paraguay (Monitor Latino)	1
Peru (Monitor Latino)	2
Puerto Rico (Monitor Latino)	1
Spain (Promusicae)	1
Switzerland (Schweizer Hitparade)	57
US Billboard Hot 100	52
US Hot Latin Songs (Billboard)	2
US Latin Airplay (Billboard)	1
US Latin Rhythm Airplay (Billboard)	1
US Rolling Stone Top 100	50
Venezuela (Monitor Latino)	18

2022 weekly chart performance for "Callaíta"
Chart (2022)	Peak position
Global 200 (Billboard)	41
Mexico (Billboard)	24

2026 weekly chart performance for "Callaíta"
Chart (2026)	Peak position
Portugal (AFP)	19

=== Year-end charts ===
2019 year-end chart performance for "Callaíta"
Chart (2019)	Position
Spain (PROMUSICAE)	7
US Hot Latin Songs (Billboard)	7

2020 year-end chart performance for "Callaíta"
Chart (2020)	Position
US Hot Latin Songs (Billboard)	18

== Certifications ==
Certifications for "Callaíta"
Region	Certification	Certified units/sales
France (SNEP)	Gold	100,000^{‡}
Italy (FIMI)	Platinum	70,000^{‡}
Spain (Promusicae)	7× Platinum	420,000^{‡}
^{‡} Sales+streaming figures based on certification alone.

== See also ==
- List of Billboard Argentina Hot 100 top-ten singles in 2019
- List of Billboard Hot Latin Songs and Latin Airplay number ones of 2019
