= List of Latin songs on the Billboard Hot 100 =

Latin music in the United States is defined by both the Recording Industry Association of America (RIAA) and Billboard magazine as any release with 51% or more of its content recorded in Spanish. (Note: Billboard changed its methodology for the Latin charts in October 2012 by making "only predominantly Spanish-language titles" eligibles for inclusion. However, the Portuguese-language song "Ai Se Eu Te Pego" by Michel Telo remained on the Latin Digital Songs chart until August 2014, despite the change of methodology.) The best performing Latin songs in the United States have been compiled by Billboard since September 1986. The magazine had already a major overall songs chart titled Hot 100 since August 1958. Since 2007, the chart has tracked digital sales, streaming figures and radio airplay. Prior to that, the Hot 100 only measured the latter format.

Ritchie Valens' version of "La Bamba" became the first Latin song to enter the Hot 100 after its debut in 1959, "Guantanamera" by the Sandpipers became the first one to reach the top 10 in 1966. Los Lobos' version of "La Bamba" became the first one to reach the number 1 spot in 1987.

In June 2017, following the number one peak of "Despacito" in the Hot 100, Philip Bump of The Washington Post related the increasing success of Spanish-language songs in the United States since 2004 with the growth of its Spanish-speaking population, highlighting an improvement from 4.9% in 1980 to 11.5% in 2015. In January 2018, Leila Cobo of Billboard related the success of "Despacito" and the increase of music consumption via streaming to the rise of predominantly Spanish-language songs charting on the Hot 100.

== Latin songs on the Hot 100 ==
As of 2026, 395 Latin songs have entered the Hot 100 chart, 1 in the 1950s, 1 in the 1960s, 2 in the 1970s, 1 in the 1980s, 5 in the 1990s, 36 in the 2000s, 80 in the 2010s and 269 in the 2020s.

A total of 26 singles managed to reach the top 10 and 5 have peaked at number 1. Only 5 Latin songs reached the top 10 between 1958 and 2016.

Puerto Rican singer Bad Bunny is the act with the most Latin top 10 entries on the chart, with 14.

=== 1950s–1990s ===
Song	Performer(s)	Debut	Peak	Ref.
"La Bamba"	Ritchie Valens	January 3, 1959	22	
"Guantanamera"	The Sandpipers	July 30, 1966	9	
"Oye Cómo Va"	Santana	February 20, 1971	13	
"Eres Tú"	Mocedades	January 12, 1974	9	
"La Bamba"	Los Lobos	June 27, 1987	1	
"Rico Suave"	Gerardo	February 2, 1991	7	
"Macarena"	Los del Río	September 2, 1995	1	
"María"	Ricky Martin	July 20, 1996	88	
"No Tengo Dinero"	Los Umbrellos	August 30, 1997	42	
"Suavemente"	Elvis Crespo	November 21, 1998	84	

=== 2000s ===
Song	Performer(s)	Debut	Peak	Ref.
"No Me Dejes de Querer"	Gloria Estefan	June 10, 2000	77	
"A Puro Dolor"	Son by Four	April 8, 2000	26	
"La Bomba"	Azul Azul	April 7, 2001	70	
"Quítame Ese Hombre"	Pilar Montenegro	May 25, 2002	74	
"Asereje"	Las Ketchup	October 12, 2002	54	
"Tal Vez"	Ricky Martin	May 31, 2003	74	
"Culo"	Pitbull featuring Lil Jon	April 24, 2004	32	
"Oye Mi Canto"	N.O.R.E. featuring Gem Star & Big Mato, Nina Sky, and Daddy Yankee	August 28, 2004	12	
"Gasolina"	Daddy Yankee	November 13, 2004	32	
"Perdidos"	Monchy & Alexandra	December 25, 2004	92	
"La Camisa Negra"	Juanes	April 9, 2005	89	
"La Tortura"	Shakira featuring Alejandro Sanz	May 7, 2005	23	
"Nada Es Para Siempre"	Luis Fonsi	August 27, 2005	90	
"Rompe"	Daddy Yankee	December 3, 2005	24	
"Rakata"	Wisin & Yandel	December 10, 2005	85	
"Ella y Yo"	Aventura featuring Don Omar	December 17, 2005	97	
"Amor Eterno"	Cristian Castro	December 24, 2005	78	
"Llamé Pa' Verte"	Wisin & Yandel	April 8, 2006	100	
"Lo Que Me Gusta A Mí"	Juanes	April 15, 2006	94	
"Lo Que Son Las Cosas"	Anaís	April 15, 2006	79	
"Down"	R.K.M. & Ken-Y	June 24, 2006	90	
"Angelito"	Don Omar	June 24, 2006	93	
"Labios Compartidos"	Maná	August 5, 2006	82	
"Ni Una Sola Palabra"	Paulina Rubio	September 30, 2006	98	
"Tu Amor"	RBD	November 4, 2006	65	
"Tengo Un Amor"	Toby Love featuring R.K.M. & Ken-Y	November 18, 2006	100	
"A La Primera Persona"	Alejandro Sanz	November 25, 2006	100	
"Ay Chico (Lengua Afuera)"	Pitbull	December 9, 2006	92	
"Ser o Parecer"	RBD	December 16, 2006	84	
"Tu Recuerdo"	Ricky Martin featuring La Mari and Tommy Torres	December 16, 2006	89	
"Qué Hiciste"	Jennifer Lopez	April 28, 2007	86	
"Impacto"	Daddy Yankee featuring Fergie	June 26, 2007	56	
"Me Enamora"	Juanes	September 29, 2007	69	
"Sexy Movimiento"	Wisin & Yandel	November 24, 2007	98	
"Te Quiero"	Flex	March 8, 2008	86	
"No Me Doy Por Vencido"	Luis Fonsi	September 20, 2008	92	
"Lloro Por Ti"	Enrique Iglesias	November 8, 2008	91	

=== 2010s ===
Song	Performer(s)	Debut	Peak	Ref.
"Cuando Me Enamoro"	Enrique Iglesias featuring Juan Luis Guerra	July 17, 2010	89	
"Bon, Bon"	Pitbull	November 20, 2010	61	
"Loca”	Shakira featuring El Cata and Dizzee Rascal	October 23, 2010	32	
"Lo Mejor de Mi Vida Eres Tú"	Ricky Martin featuring Natalia Jiménez	November 20, 2010	74	
"Danza Kuduro"	Don Omar featuring Lucenzo	May 28, 2011	82	
"You"	Romeo Santos	June 25, 2011	97	
"Taboo"	Don Omar	July 23, 2011	97	
"Promise"	Romeo Santos featuring Usher	November 5, 2011	83	
"El Verdadero Amor Perdona"	Maná featuring Prince Royce	December 10, 2011	100	
"Vivir Mi Vida"	Marc Anthony	August 10, 2013	92	
"Darte Un Beso"	Prince Royce	September 7, 2013	78	
"Loco"	Enrique Iglesias featuring Romeo Santos	September 14, 2013	80	
"Propuesta Indecente"	Romeo Santos	September 28, 2013	79	
"El Perdedor"	Enrique Iglesias featuring Marco Antonio Solís	February 8, 2014	85	
"Odio"	Romeo Santos featuring Drake	February 15, 2014	45	
"Adrenalina"	Wisin featuring Jennifer Lopez and Ricky Martin	March 22, 2014	94	
"Bailando"	Enrique Iglesias featuring Descemer Bueno and Gente de Zona	May 17, 2014	12	
"El Perdón"	Nicky Jam and Enrique Iglesias	April 11, 2015	56	
"Back It Up"	Prince Royce featuring Jennifer Lopez and Pitbull	June 27, 2015	92	
"Ginza"	J Balvin	September 26, 2015	84	
"Hasta el Amanecer"	Nicky Jam	June 11, 2016	73	
"Duele El Corazón"	Enrique Iglesias featuring Wisin	July 30, 2016	82	
"La Bicicleta"	Carlos Vives and Shakira	July 30, 2016	95	
"Chantaje"	Shakira featuring Maluma	November 19, 2016	51	
"Feliz Navidad"	José Feliciano	January 7, 2017	6	
"Shaky Shaky"	Daddy Yankee	January 14, 2017	88	
"Despacito"	Luis Fonsi and Daddy Yankee featuring Justin Bieber	February 4, 2017	1	
"El Amante"	Nicky Jam	February 18, 2017	92	
"Héroe Favorito"	Romeo Santos	March 4, 2017	77	
"Súbeme La Radio"	Enrique Iglesias featuring Descemer Bueno and Zion & Lennox	April 22, 2017	81	
"Felices Los 4"	Maluma	June 3, 2017	48	
"Me Enamoré"	Shakira	June 3, 2017	83	
"Escápate Conmigo"	Wisin featuring Ozuna	July 1, 2017	63	
"Mi Gente"	J Balvin and Willy William featuring Beyoncé	July 22, 2017	3	
"Imitadora"	Romeo Santos	August 12, 2017	91	
"Almost Like Praying"	Lin-Manuel Miranda featuring Artists for Puerto Rico (Note: Artists for Puerto Rico includes Marc Anthony, Rubén Blades, Camila Cabello, Pedro Capó, Dessa, Gloria Estefan, Fat Joe, Luis Fonsi, Juan Luis Guerra, Alex Lacamoire, John Leguizamo, Jennifer Lopez, Rita Moreno, Ednita Nazario, Joell Ortiz, Anthony Ramos, Gina Rodriguez, Gilberto Santa Rosa, PJ Sin Suela, Tommy Torres, and Ana Villafañe.)	October 28, 2017	20	
"Mayores"	Becky G featuring Bad Bunny	November 4, 2017	74	
"Échame la Culpa"	Luis Fonsi and Demi Lovato	December 9, 2017	47	
"Krippy Kush"	Farruko, Nicki Minaj, Bad Bunny, 21 Savage, and Rvssian	December 16, 2017	75	
"Perro Fiel"	Shakira featuring Nicky Jam	December 16, 2017	100	
"Bella y Sensual"	Romeo Santos featuring Nicky Jam and Daddy Yankee	December 23, 2017	95	
"Criminal"	Natti Natasha and Ozuna	December 23, 2017	95	
"La Modelo"	Ozuna and Cardi B	January 6, 2018	52	
"Corazón"	Maluma and Nego do Borel	January 13, 2018	87	
"El Baño"	Enrique Iglesias featuring Bad Bunny	January 27, 2018	98	
"El Farsante"	Ozuna and Romeo Santos	February 10, 2018	49	
"Dura"	Daddy Yankee	February 17, 2018	43	
"X"	Nicky Jam and J Balvin	March 17, 2018	41	
"I Like It"	Cardi B, Bad Bunny and J Balvin	April 21, 2018	1	
"Te Boté"	Casper Magico, Nio García, Darell, Nicky Jam, Ozuna, and Bad Bunny	May 5, 2018	36	
"Dame Tu Cosita"	El Chombo featuring Cutty Ranks	May 5, 2018	36	
"Me Niego"	Reik featuring Ozuna and Wisin	May 26, 2018	77	
"Sin Pijama"	Becky G and Natti Natasha	June 16, 2018	70	
"Única"	Ozuna	September 8, 2018	72	
"Bebe"	6ix9ine featuring Anuel AA	September 15, 2018	30	
"Vaina Loca"	Ozuna featuring Manuel Turizo	September 22, 2018	94	
"Taki Taki"	DJ Snake featuring Selena Gomez, Ozuna, and Cardi B	October 13, 2018	11	
"Mía"	Bad Bunny featuring Drake	October 27, 2018	5	
"Ella Quiere Beber"	Anuel AA and Romeo Santos	November 17, 2018	61	
"Solo de Mí"	Bad Bunny	January 12, 2019	93	
"Secreto"	Anuel AA and Karol G	February 2, 2019	68	
"Con Calma"	Daddy Yankee and Katy Perry featuring Snow	February 9, 2019	22	
"Calma"	Pedro Capó featuring Farruko	March 23, 2019	71	
"Inmortal"	Aventura	April 20, 2019	95	
"Baila Baila Baila"	Ozuna featuring Daddy Yankee, J Balvin, Farruko, and Anuel AA	May 11, 2019	69	
"Soltera"	Lunay featuring Bad Bunny and Daddy Yankee	May 25, 2019	66	
"Te Robaré"	Nicky Jam and Ozuna	May 25, 2019	91	
"HP"	Maluma	June 8, 2019	96	
"Otro Trago"	Sech and Darell featuring Nicky Jam, Ozuna, and Anuel AA	June 22, 2019	34	
"Callaíta"	Bad Bunny and Tainy	June 22, 2019	52	
"Amor Genuino"	Ozuna	June 22, 2019	92	
"Qué Pretendes"	J Balvin and Bad Bunny	July 13, 2019	65	
"No Me Conoce"	Jhayco featuring J Balvin and Bad Bunny	July 20, 2019	71	
"China"	Anuel AA, Daddy Yankee, and Karol G featuring Ozuna and J Balvin	August 3, 2019	43	
"La Canción"	J Balvin and Bad Bunny	September 14, 2019	27	
"Adicto"	Tainy, Anuel AA and Ozuna	October 5, 2019	86	
"Loco Contigo"	DJ Snake, J Balvin and Tyga	October 5, 2019	95	
"Tusa"	Karol G and Nicki Minaj	November 16, 2019	42	
"Ritmo"	Black Eyed Peas and J Balvin	November 30, 2019	26	
"Vete"	Bad Bunny	December 7, 2019	33	

=== 2020s ===
Song	Performer(s)	Debut	Peak	Ref.
"Keii"	Anuel AA	February 22, 2020	83	
"Ignorantes"	Bad Bunny and Sech	February 29, 2020	49	
"Si Veo a Tu Mamá"	Bad Bunny	March 14, 2020	32	
"La Difícil"	Bad Bunny	March 14, 2020	33	
"Yo Perreo Sola"	Bad Bunny	March 14, 2020	53	
"La Santa"	Bad Bunny and Daddy Yankee	March 14, 2020	53	
"Pero Ya No"	Bad Bunny	March 14, 2020	63	
"Safaera"	Bad Bunny featuring Jowell & Randy and Ñengo Flow	March 14, 2020	81	
"Bichiyal"	Bad Bunny and Yaviah	March 14, 2020	89	
"Soliá"	Bad Bunny	March 14, 2020	94	
"Está Cabrón Ser Yo"	Bad Bunny and Anuel AA	March 14, 2020	97	
"Sigues Con Él"	Arcángel and Sech	April 25, 2020	78	
"TKN"	Rosalía and Travis Scott	June 13, 2020	66	
"Hasta Que Dios Diga"	Anuel AA and Bad Bunny	June 13, 2020	86	
"Mamacita"	Black Eyed Peas, Ozuna and J. Rey Soul	June 20, 2020	62	
"Yaya"	6ix9ine	July 18, 2020	99	
"Un Día (One Day)"	J Balvin, Dua Lipa, Bad Bunny and Tainy	August 8, 2020	63	
"La Jeepeta"	Nio García, Anuel AA and Myke Towers featuring Brray and Juanka	August 22, 2020	93	
"Caramelo"	Ozuna featuring Karol G and Myke Towers	August 29, 2020	76	
"Hawái"	Maluma featuring The Weeknd	September 5, 2020	12	
"Relación"	Sech featuring Daddy Yankee, J Balvin, Farruko, and Rosalía	September 19, 2020	64	
"Me Gusta"	Anitta featuring Cardi B and Myke Towers	October 3, 2020	91	
"Ay, Dios Mio!"	Karol G	October 10, 2020	94	
"La Toxica"	Farruko	November 7, 2020	95	
"Dakiti"	Bad Bunny and Jhayco	November 14, 2020	5	
"Bichota"	Karol G	December 3, 2020	72	
"La Noche de Anoche"	Bad Bunny and Rosalía	December 12, 2020	53	
"Te Mudaste"	Bad Bunny	December 12, 2020	60	
"Yo Visto Asi"	Bad Bunny	December 12, 2020	64	
"Haciendo Que Me Amas"	Bad Bunny	December 12, 2020	72	
"Te Deseo Lo Mejor"	Bad Bunny	December 12, 2020	74	
"Booker T"	Bad Bunny	December 12, 2020	78	
"El Mundo Es Mio"	Bad Bunny	December 12, 2020	79	
"Hoy Cobre"	Bad Bunny	December 12, 2020	81	
"Maldita Pobreza"	Bad Bunny	December 12, 2020	87	
"La Droga"	Bad Bunny	December 12, 2020	94	
"De Una Vez"	Selena Gomez	January 30, 2021	92	
"Lo Vas a Olvidar"	Billie Eilish and Rosalía	February 6, 2021	62	
"Antes"	Anuel AA and Ozuna	February 6, 2021	100	
"Baila Conmigo"	Selena Gomez and Rauw Alejandro	February 12, 2021	74	
"Bandido"	Myke Towers and Juhn	February 20, 2021	82	
"Telepatía"	Kali Uchis	March 6, 2021	25	
"Botella Tras Botella"	Christian Nodal and Gera MX	May 8, 2021	60	
"Todo de Ti"	Rauw Alejandro	June 12, 2021	32	
"Yonaguni"	Bad Bunny	June 19, 2021	10	
"Fiel"	Los Legendarios, Wisin and Jhayco	June 26, 2021	62	
"AM (Remix)"	Nio Garcia, J Balvin and Bad Bunny	July 10, 2021	41	
"Volando (Remix)"	Mora, Bad Bunny and Sech	July 24, 2021	89	
"De Museo"	Bad Bunny	July 24, 2021	94	
"Pepas"	Farruko	August 7, 2021	25	
"Volví"	Aventura and Bad Bunny	August 14, 2021	22	
"In da Getto"	J Balvin and Skrillex	September 11, 2021	90	
"Está Dañada"	Iván Cornejo	October 16, 2021	61	
"Jugaste y Sufrí"	Eslabon Armado featuring DannyLux	October 16, 2021	69	
"Lo Siento BB:/"	Tainy, Bad Bunny and Julieta Venegas	October 23, 2021	51	
"Ya Supérame (En Vivo)"	Grupo Firme	October 30, 2021	91	
"La Fama"	Rosalía and The Weeknd	November 27, 2021	94	
"Dos Oruguitas"	Sebastián Yatra	January 15, 2022	36	
"Colombia, Mi Encanto"	Carlos Vives	February 12, 2022	100	
"Mamiii"	Becky G and Karol G	February 26, 2022	15	
"Soy el Único"	Yahritza y su Esencia	April 9, 2022	20	
"Envolver"	Anitta	April 9, 2022	70	
"X Última Vez"	Daddy Yankee and Bad Bunny	April 9, 2022	73	
"Sigue"	J Balvin and Ed Sheeran	April 9, 2022	89	
"Desesperados"	Rauw Alejandro and Chencho Corleone	April 16, 2022	91	
"Provenza"	Karol G	May 7, 2022	25	
"Moscow Mule"	Bad Bunny	May 21, 2022	4	
"Tití Me Preguntó"	Bad Bunny	May 21, 2022	5	
"Después de la Playa"	Bad Bunny	May 21, 2022	6	
"Me Porto Bonito"	Bad Bunny and Chencho Corleone	May 21, 2022	6	
"Party"	Bad Bunny and Rauw Alejandro	May 21, 2022	14	
"Un Ratito"	Bad Bunny	May 21, 2022	16	
"Tarot"	Bad Bunny and Jhayco	May 21, 2022	18	
"Yo No Soy Celoso"	Bad Bunny	May 21, 2022	22	
"Ojitos Lindos"	Bad Bunny and Bomba Estéreo	May 21, 2022	26	
"Neverita"	Bad Bunny	May 21, 2022	31	
"La Corriente"	Bad Bunny and Tony Dize	May 21, 2022	32	
"Efecto"	Bad Bunny	May 21, 2022	34	
"Aguacero"	Bad Bunny	May 21, 2022	44	
"Dos Mil 16"	Bad Bunny	May 21, 2022	45	
"Otro Atardecer"	Bad Bunny and The Marías	May 21, 2022	49	
"Andrea"	Bad Bunny and Buscabulla	May 21, 2022	51	
"El Apagón"	Bad Bunny	May 21, 2022	54	
"Un Verano Sin Ti"	Bad Bunny	May 21, 2022	55	
"Un Coco"	Bad Bunny	May 21, 2022	56	
"Me Fui de Vacaciones"	Bad Bunny	May 21, 2022	59	
"Enséñame a Bailar"	Bad Bunny	May 21, 2022	60	
"Agosto"	Bad Bunny	May 21, 2022	74	
"Te Felicito"	Shakira and Rauw Alejandro	June 18, 2022	67	
"Bzrp Music Sessions, Vol. 52"	Bizarrap and Quevedo	August 6, 2022	79	
"Despechá"	Rosalía	August 20, 2022	63	
"La Bachata"	Manuel Turizo	September 3, 2022	67	
"Gatúbela"	Karol G and Maldy	September 10, 2022	37	
"Sin Fin"	Romeo Santos and Justin Timberlake	September 17, 2022	100	
"No Se Va"	Grupo Frontera	October 8, 2022	57	
"Lokera"	Rauw Alejandro, Lyanno and Brray	October 22, 2022	99	
"Monotonía"	Shakira and Ozuna	November 5, 2022	65	
"La Jumpa"	Arcángel and Bad Bunny	December 12, 2022	68	
"Gato de Noche"	Ñengo Flow and Bad Bunny	January 7, 2023	60	
"Que Vuelvas"	Carín León and Grupo Frontera	January 7, 2023	50	
"Bebe Dame"	Fuerza Regida and Grupo Frontera	January 7, 2023	25	
"Bzrp Music Sessions, Vol. 53"	Bizarrap and Shakira	January 28, 2023	9	
"AMG"	Gabito Ballesteros, Peso Pluma and Natanael Cano	January 28, 2023	37	
"Fin de Semana"	Junior H and Óscar Maydon	February 11, 2023	86	
"Hey Mor"	Ozuna featuring Feid	February 11, 2023	85	
"X Si Volvemos"	Karol G and Romeo Santos	February 18, 2023	48	
"PRC"	Peso Pluma and Natanael Cano	February 18, 2023	33	
"Yandel 150"	Yandel and Feid	February 18, 2023	71	
"TQG"	Karol G and Shakira	March 11, 2023	7	
"Mientras Me Curo del Cora"	Karol G	March 11, 2023	68	
"Gucci los Paños"	Karol G	March 11, 2023	71	
"Tus Gafitas"	Karol G	March 11, 2023	73	
"Cairo"	Karol G and Ovy on the Drums	March 11, 2023	82	
"Pero Tú"	Karol G and Quevedo	March 11, 2023	86	
"Ojos Ferrari"	Karol G, Justin Quiles and Ángel Dior	March 11, 2023	95	
"Besties"	Karol G	March 11, 2023	96	
"Mañana Será Bonito"	Karol G and Carla Morrison	March 11, 2023	98	
"Por Las Noches"	Peso Pluma	March 25, 2023	28	
"Ella Baila Sola"	Eslabon Armado and Peso Pluma	April 1, 2023	4	
"La Bebé"	Yng Lvcas and Peso Pluma	April 1, 2023	11	
"El Gordo Trae el Mando"	Chino Pacas	April 1, 2023	58	
"Coco Chanel"	Eladio Carrión and Bad Bunny	April 1, 2023	87	
"Beso"	Rosalía and Rauw Alejandro	April 8, 2023	52	
"Ch y la Pizza"	Fuerza Regida and Natanael Cano	April 8, 2023	68	
"El Azul"	Junior H and Peso Pluma	April 22, 2023	55	
"Un x100to"	Grupo Frontera and Bad Bunny	April 29, 2023	5	
"Chanel"	Becky G and Peso Pluma	April 29, 2023	55	
"Igualito a Mi Apá"	Fuerza Regida and Peso Pluma	April 29, 2023	80	
"Di Que Sí"	Grupo Marca Registrada and Grupo Frontera	April 29, 2023	89	
"Frágil"	Yahritza y su Esencia and Grupo Frontera	May 6, 2023	69	
"Mejor Que Yo"	Anuel AA, Mambo Kingz and DJ Luian	May 20, 2023	83	
"Acróstico"	Shakira	May 27, 2023	84	
"Where She Goes"	Bad Bunny	June 3, 2023	8	
"TQM"	Fuerza Regida	June 3, 2023	34	
"Bye"	Peso Pluma	June 10, 2023	48	
"Bzrp Music Sessions, Vol. 55"	Bizarrap and Peso Pluma	June 17, 2023	31	
"Plebada"	El Alfa and Peso Pluma	June 24, 2023	68	
"Classy 101"	Feid and Young Miko	July 1, 2023	99	
"Sabor Fresa"	Fuerza Regida	July 8, 2023	26	
"Luna"	Peso Pluma and Junior H	July 8, 2023	30	
"Lady Gaga"	Peso Pluma, Gabito Ballesteros and Junior H	July 8, 2023	35	
"VVS"	Peso Pluma, Edgardo Nuñez and Los Dareyes de la Sierra	July 8, 2023	54	
"Rubicon"	Peso Pluma	July 8, 2023	63	
"Nueva Vida"	Peso Pluma	July 8, 2023	86	
"Lagunas"	Peso Pluma and Jasiel Nuñez	July 8, 2023	77	
"Rosa Pastel"	Peso Pluma and Jasiel Nuñez	July 8, 2023	93	
"Tulum"	Peso Pluma and Grupo Frontera	July 15, 2023	43	
"Mojabi Ghost"	Tainy and Bad Bunny	July 15, 2023	57	
"Lala"	Myke Towers	July 22, 2023	43	
"S91"	Karol G	July 29, 2023	45	
"Quema"	Ryan Castro and Peso Pluma	July 29, 2023	92	
"Aquí Te Espero"	Iván Cornejo	August 12, 2023	89	
"El Amor de Su Vida"	Grupo Frontera and Grupo Firme	August 19, 2023	67	
"Mi Ex Tenía Razón"	Karol G	August 26, 2023	22	
"Qlona"	Karol G and Peso Pluma	August 26, 2023	28	
"Una Noche En Medellín (Remix)"	Karol G, Cris MJ and Ryan Castro	August 26, 2023	68	
"Oki Doki"	Karol G	August 26, 2023	83	
"Amargura"	Karol G	August 26, 2023	85	
"Primera Cita"	Carín León	September 9, 2023	97	
"Qué Onda"	Calle 24, Chino Pacas and Fuerza Regida	September 16, 2023	61	
"Bipolar"	Peso Pluma, Jasiel Nuñez and Junior H	September 23, 2023	60	
"El Jefe"	Shakira and Fuerza Regida	October 7, 2023	55	
"Un Preview"	Bad Bunny	October 7, 2023	43	
"Según Quién"	Maluma and Carín León	October 7, 2023	65	
"Y Lloro"	Junior H	October 21, 2023	79	
"Mónaco"	Bad Bunny	October 28, 2023	5	
"Fina"	Bad Bunny and Young Miko	October 28, 2023	14	
"Perro Negro"	Bad Bunny and Feid	October 28, 2023	20	
"Nadie Sabe"	Bad Bunny	October 28, 2023	22	
"Hibiki"	Bad Bunny and Mora	October 28, 2023	24	
"Mr. October"	Bad Bunny	October 28, 2023	28	
"Cybertruck"	Bad Bunny	October 28, 2023	30	
"Teléfono Nuevo"	Bad Bunny and Luar La L	October 28, 2023	32	
"Baby Nueva"	Bad Bunny	October 28, 2023	34	
"Seda"	Bad Bunny and Bryant Myers	October 28, 2023	38	
"Gracias por Nada"	Bad Bunny	October 28, 2023	52	
"Vou 787"	Bad Bunny	October 28, 2023	53	
"Mercedes Carota"	Bad Bunny and Yovngchimi	October 28, 2023	57	
"Los Pits"	Bad Bunny	October 28, 2023	61	
"No Me Quiero Casar"	Bad Bunny	October 28, 2023	65	
"Vuelve Candy B"	Bad Bunny	October 28, 2023	70	
"Baticano"	Bad Bunny	October 28, 2023	78	
"Thunder y Lightning"	Bad Bunny and Eladio Carrión	October 28, 2023	80	
"Acho PR"	Bad Bunny, Arcángel, De la Ghetto and Ñengo Flow	October 28, 2023	83	
"Harley Quinn"	Fuerza Regida and Marshmello	November 18, 2023	40	
"Labios Mordidos"	Kali Uchis and Karol G	December 9, 2023	97	
"Bellakeo"	Peso Pluma and Anitta	December 30, 2023	53	
"La Diabla"	Xavi	December 30, 2023	20	
"La Víctima"	Xavi	December 30, 2023	46	
"Rompe la Dompe"	Peso Pluma, Junior H and Óscar Maydon	January 13, 2024	81	
"Igual que un Ángel"	Kali Uchis and Peso Pluma	January 27, 2024	22	
"First Love"	Oscar Ortiz and Edgardo Nuñez	February 3, 2024	91	
"La Intención"	Christian Nodal and Peso Pluma	February 10, 2024	92	
"Contigo"	Karol G and Tiësto	March 2, 2024	61	
"Tú Name"	Fuerza Regida	March 2, 2024	66	
"Baby Please"	Iván Cornejo	March 30, 2024	95	
"Gata Only"	FloyyMenor and Cris MJ	March 30, 2024	27	
"La People II"	Peso Pluma, Tito Double P and Joel de la P	April 6, 2024	69	
"Puntería"	Shakira and Cardi B	April 6, 2024	72	
"Corazón de Piedra"	Xavi	April 6, 2024	73	
"Adivino"	Myke Towers and Bad Bunny	May 11, 2024	63	
"Si No Quieres No"	Luis R. Conriquez and Netón Vega	May 18, 2024	53	
"La Durango"	Peso Pluma, Junior H and Eslabon Armado	May 25, 2024	75	
"Si No Es Contigo"	Cris MJ	June 8, 2024	72	
"Si Antes Te Hubiera Conocido"	Karol G	July 6, 2024	32	
"Reloj"	Peso Pluma and Iván Cornejo	July 6, 2024	69	
"Vino Tinto"	Peso Pluma, Natanael Cano and Gabito Ballesteros	July 6, 2024	91	
"La Patrulla"	Peso Pluma and Netón Vega	July 6, 2024	47	
"Alibi"	Sevdaliza, Pabllo Vittar and Yseult	August 3, 2024	95	
"Nel"	Fuerza Regida	August 10, 2024	70	
"Dos Días"	Tito Double P and Peso Pluma	September 21, 2024	51	
"Una Velita"	Bad Bunny	October 5, 2024	79	
"El Lokerón"	Tito Double P	October 12, 2024	73	
"Tu Boda"	Óscar Maydon and Fuerza Regida	November 2, 2024	22	
"+57"	Karol G, Feid and DFZM featuring Ovy on the Drums, J Balvin, Maluma, Ryan Castro and Blessd	November 23, 2024	62	
"Qué Pasaría..."	Rauw Alejandro and Bad Bunny	November 30, 2024	34	
"Khé?"	Rauw Alejandro and Romeo Santos	November 30, 2024	60	
"Tú con Él"	Rauw Alejandro	November 30, 2024	69	
"Se Fue"	Rauw Alejandro and Laura Pausini	November 30, 2024	82	
"Revolú"	Rauw Alejandro and Feid	November 30, 2024	88	
"Déjame Entrar"	Rauw Alejandro	November 30, 2024	96	
"El Clúb"	Bad Bunny	December 21, 2024	27	
"Rosones"	Tito Double P	December 21, 2024	76	
"Loco"	Netón Vega	January 11, 2025	43	
"Nadie"	Tito Double P	January 11, 2025	78	
"Pitorro de Coco"	Bad Bunny	January 11, 2025	50	
"Nuevayol"	Bad Bunny	January 18, 2025	5	
"Baile Inolvidable"	Bad Bunny	January 18, 2025	2	
"Voy a Llevarte Pa' PR"	Bad Bunny	January 18, 2025	14	
"DTMF"	Bad Bunny	January 18, 2025	1	
"Veldá"	Bad Bunny, Omar Courtz and Dei V	January 18, 2025	23	
"Perfumito Nuevo"	Bad Bunny and RaiNao	January 18, 2025	31	
"Weltita"	Bad Bunny and Chuwi	January 18, 2025	32	
"Eoo"	Bad Bunny	January 18, 2025	11	
"Ketu Tecré"	Bad Bunny	January 18, 2025	38	
"Kloufrens"	Bad Bunny	January 18, 2025	40	
"Bokete"	Bad Bunny	January 18, 2025	42	
"Turista"	Bad Bunny	January 18, 2025	45	
"Café con Ron"	Bad Bunny and Los Pleneros de la Cresta	January 18, 2025	48	
"Lo Que Le Pasó a Hawaii"	Bad Bunny	January 18, 2025	62	
"La Mudanza"	Bad Bunny	January 18, 2025	51	
"Me Jalo"	Fuerza Regida and Grupo Frontera	February 8, 2025	48	
"7 Días"	Gabito Ballesteros and Tito Double P	February 15, 2025	84	
"Por Esos Ojos"	Fuerza Regida	March 1, 2025	64	
"Tattoo"	Tito Double P	March 15, 2025	72	
"Te Quería Ver"	Alemán and Netón Vega	March 22, 2025	58	
"Ojos Tristes"	Selena Gomez, Benny Blanco and The Marías	April 5, 2025	56	
"Morena"	Netón Vega and Peso Pluma	April 12, 2025	83	
"Me Prometí"	Iván Cornejo	May 17, 2025	95	
"Marlboro Rojo"	Fuerza Regida	May 24, 2025	64	
"Latina Foreva"	Karol G	June 7, 2025	66	
"Tu Sancho"	Fuerza Regida	June 14, 2025	65	
"Papasito"	Karol G	July 5, 2025	74	
"Verano Rosa"	Karol G and Feid	July 5, 2025	96	
"Frecuencia"	Los Dareyes de la Sierra	August 2, 2025	82	
"Amor"	Emmanuel Cortes	November 8, 2025	88	
"La Perla"	Rosalía and Yahritza y su Esencia	November 22, 2025	82	
"Dopamina"	Peso Pluma and Tito Double P	January 10, 2026	52	
"Daño"	Peso Pluma and Tito Double P	January 10, 2026	75	
"Ni Pedo"	Peso Pluma and Tito Double P	January 10, 2026	76	
"Bckpckbyz"	Peso Pluma and Tito Double P	January 10, 2026	79	
"Droga Letal"	Junior H, Gael Valenzuela and Peso Pluma	February 28, 2026	100	
"Last Breath"	Kanye West and Peso Pluma	April 11, 2026	81	
"Ferrari"	Clave Especial, Fuerza Regida and Los Gemelos de Sinaloa	May 2, 2026	83	
"Después de Ti"	Karol G and Greg Gonzalez	May 9, 2026	96	
"Matadora"	Karol G	August 8, 2026	58	
"Ahí"	Karol G and Drake	August 22, 2026	44	
"Bby Wow"	Karol G, Judeline and Rusowsky	August 22, 2026	6	
"Ayúdame"	Los Dos de Tamaulipas	August 29, 2026	99	

== Latin songs on Billboard's Year-End Hot 100 Songs charts ==
Year	Song	Performer(s)	Rank
1966	"Guantanamera"	The Sandpipers	83
1974	"Eres Tú"	Mocedades	62
1987	"La Bamba"	Los Lobos	11
1991	"Rico Suave"	Gerardo	89
1996	"Macarena" (Bayside Boys Mix)	Los del Río	1
1996	"Macarena"	Los del Río	98
2000	"A Puro Dolor"	Son by Four	61
2005	"La Tortura"	Shakira featuring Alejandro Sanz	60
2006	"Rompe"	Daddy Yankee	74
2014	"Bailando"	Enrique Iglesias featuring Descemer Bueno and Gente de Zona	38
2015	"El Perdón"	Nicky Jam and Enrique Iglesias	96
2017	"Despacito"	Luis Fonsi and Daddy Yankee featuring Justin Bieber	2
2017	"Mi Gente"	J Balvin and Willy William featuring Beyoncé	50
2018	"I Like It"	Cardi B, Bad Bunny and J Balvin	7
2018	"Te Boté"	Casper Magico, Nio García, Darell, Nicky Jam, Ozuna, and Bad Bunny	81
2018	"X"	Nicky Jam and J Balvin	90
2018	"Dura"	Daddy Yankee	93
2018	"Mi Gente"	J Balvin and Willy William featuring Beyoncé	99
2019	"Mia"	Bad Bunny featuring Drake	44
2019	"Taki Taki"	DJ Snake featuring Selena Gomez, Ozuna and Cardi B	57
2019	"Con Calma"	Daddy Yankee and Katy Perry featuring Snow	65
2019	"I Like It"	Cardi B, Bad Bunny and J Balvin	69
2020	"Ritmo"	Black Eyed Peas and J Balvin	50
2021	"Dakiti"	Bad Bunny and Jhayco	28
2021	"Telepatía"	Kali Uchis	49
2021	"Yonaguni"	Bad Bunny	83
2021	"Todo de Ti"	Rauw Alejandro	100
2022	"Me Porto Bonito"	Bad Bunny and Chencho Corleone	20
2022	"Tití Me Preguntó"	Bad Bunny	22
2022	"Moscow Mule"	Bad Bunny	44
2022	"Mamiii"	Becky G and Karol G	59
2022	"Provenza"	Karol G	63
2022	"Efecto"	Bad Bunny	69
2022	"Party"	Bad Bunny and Rauw Alejandro	77
2022	"Después de la Playa"	Bad Bunny	78
2022	"Ojitos Lindos"	Bad Bunny and Bomba Estereo	87
2023	"Ella Baila Sola"	Eslabon Armado and Peso Pluma	26
2023	"La Bebé"	Yng Lvcas and Peso Pluma	40
2023	"Un x100to"	Grupo Frontera and Bad Bunny	49
2023	"TQG"	Karol G and Shakira	65
2023	"Where She Goes"	Bad Bunny	72
2023	"Bebe Dame"	Fuerza Regida and Grupo Frontera	73
2023	"Por Las Noches"	Peso Pluma	86
2023	"PRC"	Peso Pluma and Natanael Cano	90
2023	"Bzrp Music Sessions, Vol. 53"	Bizarrap and Shakira	96
2024	"Gata Only"	FloyyMenor and Cris MJ	52
2024	"La Diabla"	Xavi	72
2024	"Mónaco"	Bad Bunny	82
2025	"DTMF"	Bad Bunny	51
2025	"Baile Inolvidable"	Bad Bunny	70
2025	"Eoo"	Bad Bunny	77
2025	"Tu Boda"	Óscar Maydon and Fuerza Regida	87
2025	"Nuevayol"	Bad Bunny	89
2025	"Loco"	Netón Vega	100

== Latin songs on Billboard's Greatest Hot 100 Songs of All-Time list ==
In 2008, for the 50th anniversary of the Hot 100, Billboard compiled a ranking of the 100 best-performing songs on the chart since its inception in 1958. The ranking was revised in 2013, 2015 and 2018. As of 2018, only two primarily Spanish-language songs have appeared on the top 100: "Macarena" (Bayside Boys Mix) by Los del Río, which peaked at number five on the ranking's first edition in 2008, and "Despacito" by Luis Fonsi and Daddy Yankee featuring Justin Bieber. Additionally, Los Lobos' version of "La Bamba" ranks at number 372.

Song	Performer(s)	Rank	Year released
"Macarena" (Bayside Boys Mix)	Los del Río	8	1996
"Despacito"	Luis Fonsi and Daddy Yankee featuring Justin Bieber	33	2017
"La Bamba"	Los Lobos	372	1987
