= Most Wanted Tour (Bad Bunny) =

2024 concert tour by Bad Bunny

- Continental tour by Bad Bunny
- Promotional poster for the tour
- Location: North America
- Associated album: Nadie Sabe Lo Que Va a Pasar Mañana
- Start date: February 21, 2024
- End date: June 9, 2024
- No. of shows: 49
- Attendance: 753,000
- Box office: US$211.4 million
- Website: https://mostwantedtour.com

Bad Bunny concert chronology
- World's Hottest Tour (2022); Most Wanted Tour (2024); No Me Quiero Ir de Aquí (2025)

The Most Wanted Tour was the fifth concert tour by Puerto Rican rapper Bad Bunny to promote his fifth studio album Nadie Sabe Lo Que Va a Pasar Mañana (2023). Promoted by Live Nation and Rimas Entertainment, it began on February 21, 2024 in Salt Lake City and concluded on June 9 in San Juan, Puerto Rico, comprising 48 dates over 31 cities throughout North America. All the shows were reported sold out and the tour grossed over US$211.4 million and sold over 753,000 tickets. It was ranked 2nd on Billboard Top 10 Latin Tours of 2024.

== Background ==
In 2022, Bad Bunny embarked on two concert tours—El Último Tour del Mundo, which consisted of arena shows across North America and the World's Hottest Tour visiting stadiums across the American continent. The two tours grossed over US$435 million across 81 shows in 2022, setting a record for the highest combined touring gross by an artist in a single calendar year.

Further, Bad Bunny's fourth studio album Un Verano Sin Ti was the best selling album of 2022 in United States, becoming the first all Spanish language to do so. Also, it was the world's best-performing album of 2022 according to IFPI, making him the first Latino to have won an IFPI Global Chart Award. Following the last concert of the World's Hottest Tour, which visited stadiums across North America and Latin America, to enjoy his achievements and to focus on his physical and mental health.

Despite this, in April 2023 Bad Bunny headlined the Coachella festival, becoming the first Latin act do so. On May 15, 2023, he announced the lead single "Where She Goes". In early October, speculation and hits of a new album was all over social media. On October 8, 2023, Bad Bunny announced the release of his fifth studio album, Nadie Sabe Lo Que Va a Pasar Mañana. Shortly after the release of the album, he announced the dates of his upcoming tour on October 19, 2023. According to the artist, the tour is dedicated to long-time fans, stating, "If you're not a real fan, don't come." A promotional poster for the tour included the phrase "Don't let it escape because you may never see it again." Two consecutive shows were announced in the cities of Las Vegas, Phoenix, San Francisco, Austin, Atlanta, Orlando and three consecutive performances at Kaseya Center in Miami, Los Angeles, Chicago and New York.

== Set list ==
This set list is representative of the show on 26 May 2024 in Miami. It is not representative of all concerts for the duration of the tour.

1. "Nadie Sabe"
2. "Monaco"
3. "Fina"
4. "Hibiki"
5. "Mr. October"
6. "Mercedes Carota"
7. "Cybertruck"
8. "Baticano"
9. "Teléfono Nuevo"
10. "Tu No Metes Cabra" / "Pa' Ti" / "No Te Hagas" / "Vuelve" / "Me Mata" / "Soy Peor" / "Tu No Vive Así" / "Chambea" / "Diles" (Trap Medley)
11. "25/8"
12. "Vuelve Candy B"
13. "Thunder y Lightning"
14. "Gracias por Nada"
15. "Un x100to"
16. "Callaíta"
17. "Yonaguni"
18. "La Canción
19. "Perro Negro"
20. "Safaera"
21. "Yo Perreo Sola"
22. "La Santa"
23. "La Jumpa"
24. "Dakiti"
25. "Efecto"
26. "Me Porto Bonito"
27. "Un Preview"
28. "Where She Goes"

== Tour dates ==
List of 2024 concerts, showing date, city, country, venue, attendance (tickets sold / total available), and gross revenue
Date (2024)	City	Country	Venue	Attendance	Revenue
February 21	Salt Lake City	United States	Delta Center	14,223 / 14,223	$3,808,271
February 23	Paradise	United States	T-Mobile Arena	32,749 / 32,749	$8,386,946
February 24	Paradise	United States	T-Mobile Arena	32,749 / 32,749	$8,386,946
February 27	Phoenix	United States	Footprint Center	27,895 / 27,895	$7,326,516
February 28	Phoenix	United States	Footprint Center	27,895 / 27,895	$7,326,516
March 1	San Francisco	United States	Chase Center	31,372 / 31,372	$10,114,132
March 2	San Francisco	United States	Chase Center	31,372 / 31,372	$10,114,132
March 5	Sacramento	United States	Golden 1 Center	16,462 / 16,462	$4,453,458
March 7	Portland	United States	Moda Center	16,656 / 16,656	$3,460,370
March 9	Seattle	United States	Climate Pledge Arena	16,328 / 16,328	$4,895,698
March 13	Los Angeles	United States	Crypto.com Arena	47,586 / 47,586	$20,226,378
March 14	Los Angeles	United States	Crypto.com Arena	47,586 / 47,586	$20,226,378
March 15	Los Angeles	United States	Crypto.com Arena	47,586 / 47,586	$20,226,378
March 20	Denver	United States	Ball Arena	15,511 / 15,511	$4,841,018
March 26	Kansas City	United States	T-Mobile Center	14,124 / 14,124	$3,215,409
March 28	Chicago	United States	United Center	48,900 / 48,900	$13,400,000
March 29	Chicago	United States	United Center	48,900 / 48,900	$13,400,000
March 30	Chicago	United States	United Center	48,900 / 48,900	$13,400,000
April 4	Toronto	Canada	Scotiabank Arena	16,937 / 16,937	$4,125,948
April 6	Detroit	United States	Little Caesars Arena	15,841 / 15,841	$3,776,826
April 9	Washington, D.C	United States	Capital One Arena	17,503 / 17,503	$6,033,034
April 11	Brooklyn	United States	Barclays Center	45,529 / 45,529	$17,769,048
April 12	Brooklyn	United States	Barclays Center	45,529 / 45,529	$17,769,048
April 13	Brooklyn	United States	Barclays Center	45,529 / 45,529	$17,769,048
April 17	Boston	United States	TD Garden	15,621 / 15,621	$5,287,626
April 19	Philadelphia	United States	Wells Fargo Center	17,451 / 17,451	$5,192,150
April 20	Hartford	United States	XL Center	13,751 / 13,751	$3,903,941
April 22	Louisville	United States	KFC Yum! Center	15,362 / 15,362	$2,620,576
April 24	Tulsa	United States	BOK Center	12,196 / 12,196	$2,073,059
April 26	Austin	United States	Moody Center	27,202 / 27,202	$8,658,361
April 27	Austin	United States	Moody Center	27,202 / 27,202	$8,658,361
April 30	Houston	United States	Toyota Center	25,142 / 25,142	$6,237,451
May 1	Houston	United States	Toyota Center	25,142 / 25,142	$6,237,451
May 3	Dallas	United States	American Airlines Center	29,824 / 29,824	$8,484,358
May 4	Dallas	United States	American Airlines Center	29,824 / 29,824	$8,484,358
May 7	New Orleans	United States	Smoothie King Center	13,889 / 13,889	$2,505,883
May 10	Charlotte	United States	Spectrum Center	16,336 / 16,336	$5,118,891
May 11	Nashville	United States	Bridgestone Arena	15,734 / 15,734	$3,229,048
May 14	Atlanta	United States	State Farm Arena	25,496 / 25,496	$5,404,203
May 15	Atlanta	United States	State Farm Arena	25,496 / 25,496	$5,404,203
May 17	Orlando	United States	Kia Center	31,759 / 31,759	$9,101,053
May 18	Orlando	United States	Kia Center	31,759 / 31,759	$9,101,053
May 21	Tampa	United States	Amalie Arena	17,186 / 17,186	$4,779,112
May 24	Miami	United States	Kaseya Center	49,260 / 49,260	$18,848,447
May 25	Miami	United States	Kaseya Center	49,260 / 49,260	$18,848,447
May 26	Miami	United States	Kaseya Center	49,260 / 49,260	$18,848,447
June 7	San Juan	Puerto Rico	Coliseo de Puerto Rico	33,036 / 33,036	$2,388,118
June 8	San Juan	Puerto Rico	Coliseo de Puerto Rico	33,036 / 33,036	$2,388,118
June 9	San Juan	Puerto Rico	Coliseo de Puerto Rico	33,036 / 33,036	$2,388,118
Total				—	—

== Cancelled shows ==
List of cancelled concerts, showing date, city, country, venue, and reason for cancellation
Date	City	Country	Venue	Reason
March 23, 2024	Minneapolis	United States	Target Center	Low ticket sales and bad weather

== See also ==
- List of Billboard Boxscore number-one concert series of the 2020s
