= List of Billboard Global 200 top-ten singles in 2023 =

This is a list of singles that charted in the top ten of the Billboard Global 200, an all-genre singles chart, in 2023.

== Top-ten singles ==
Key

- ↑ – indicates single's top 10 entry was also its Global 200 debut

List of Billboard Global 200 top ten singles that peaked in 2023
Top ten entry date	Single	Artist(s)	Peak	Peak date	Weeks in top ten	Ref.
Singles from 2022
October 29	"Calm Down"^{[B]}	Rema and Selena Gomez	3	January 21	33	
November 5	"Karma"^{[G]} ↑	Taylor Swift featuring Ice Spice^{1}	6	June 10	2	
December 24	"Kill Bill"^{[B]} ↑	SZA	1	January 14	21	
Singles from 2023
January 14	"Ditto"	NewJeans	8	January 14	3	
January 14	"Escapism"	Raye featuring 070 Shake	7	January 21	7	
January 21	"OMG"	NewJeans	10	January 21	1	
January 28	"Flowers" ↑	Miley Cyrus	1	January 28	30	
January 28	"Bzrp Music Sessions, Vol. 53"	Bizarrap and Shakira	2	January 28	9	
February 25	"Boy's a Liar, Pt. 2"	PinkPantheress and Ice Spice	3	March 4	7	
March 11	"TQG" ↑	Karol G and Shakira	1	March 11	8	
March 11	"Die for You"	The Weeknd and Ariana Grande^{2}	2	March 11	13	
March 11	"Last Night"^{[H]}	Morgan Wallen	5	March 18	15	
April 1	"Set Me Free, Pt. 2" ↑	Jimin	8	April 1	1	
April 1	"All of the Girls You Loved Before" ↑	Taylor Swift	10	April 1	1	
April 8	"Like Crazy" ↑	Jimin	2	April 8	3	
April 8	"La Bebé"	Yng Lvcas and Peso Pluma	2	June 10	17	
April 8	"Beso" ↑	Rosalía and Rauw Alejandro	10	April 8	1	
April 15	"Flower" ↑	Jisoo	2	April 15	1	
April 15	"Ella Baila Sola"	Eslabón Armado and Peso Pluma	1	April 29	14	
April 22	"Search & Rescue" ↑	Drake	2	April 22	1	
April 29	"Un x100to" ↑	Grupo Frontera and Bad Bunny	1	May 6	11	
April 29	"Cupid"	Fifty Fifty	2	May 27	12	
May 6	"Idol"	Yoasobi	7	July 1	11	
May 27	"All My Life"^{[G]} ↑	Lil Durk featuring J. Cole	7	May 27	2	
June 3	"Where She Goes" ↑	Bad Bunny	1	June 3	7	
June 17	"Bzrp Music Sessions, Vol. 55"	Bizarrap and Peso Pluma	2	June 17	3	
June 17	"Sprinter" ↑	Dave and Central Cee	9	June 17	1	
June 24	"Take Two" ↑	BTS	1	June 24	1	
July 8	"Cruel Summer"^{[I]}^{[M]}^{[O]}	Taylor Swift	1	November 4	31	
July 15	"Vampire"^{[I]}^{[J]} ↑	Olivia Rodrigo	1	July 15	12	
July 22	"Super Shy" ↑	NewJeans	2	July 22	5	
July 22	"LaLa"	Myke Towers	3	July 22	13	
July 22	"I Can See You" ↑	Taylor Swift	4	July 22	1	
July 22	"FukUMean"^{[I]}^{[J]}	Gunna	6	July 29	7	
July 22	"Back to December (Taylor's Version)" ↑	Taylor Swift	10	July 22	1	
July 29	"Seven" ↑	Jung Kook featuring Latto	1	July 29	21	
July 29	"Try That in a Small Town" ↑	Jason Aldean	2	July 29	2	
August 5	"K-Pop" ↑	Travis Scott, Bad Bunny and The Weeknd	5	August 5	2	
August 5	"Barbie World"	Nicki Minaj and Ice Spice with Aqua	6	August 5	5	
August 5	"What Was I Made For?"	Billie Eilish	2	August 19	7	
August 5	"Dance the Night"^{[L]}	Dua Lipa	3	August 19	9	
August 12	"Meltdown" ↑	Travis Scott featuring Drake	2	August 12	2	
August 12	"Fe!n" ↑	Travis Scott featuring Playboi Carti	3	August 12	1	
August 12	"Hyaena" ↑	Travis Scott	10	August 12	1	
August 26	"Rich Men North of Richmond" ↑	Oliver Anthony Music	2	August 26	3	
August 26	"Bad Idea Right?"^{[K]} ↑	Olivia Rodrigo	5	September 23	2	
September 2	"Paint the Town Red"	Doja Cat	1	September 16	16	
September 9	"I Remember Everything"^{[L]} ↑	Zach Bryan featuring Kacey Musgraves	4	September 9	5	
September 9	"Used to Be Young" ↑	Miley Cyrus	6	September 9	1	
September 9	"Qlona"	Karol G and Peso Pluma	7	September 16	6	
September 23	"Slow Dancing" ↑	V	4	September 23	1	
September 23	"Get Him Back!" ↑	Olivia Rodrigo	7	September 23	1	
September 23	"All-American Bitch" ↑	Olivia Rodrigo	9	September 23	1	
September 30	"Slime You Out" ↑	Drake featuring SZA	3	September 30	1	
September 30	"Snooze"	SZA	6	September 30	1	
October 7	"Greedy"	Tate McRae	1	November 25	24	
October 7	"Strangers"^{[N]}	Kenya Grace	5	October 7	3	
October 14	"3D"^{[O]} ↑	Jung Kook featuring Jack Harlow	1	October 14	5	
October 21	"IDGAF" ↑	Drake featuring Yeat	1	October 21	2	
October 21	"First Person Shooter" ↑	Drake featuring J. Cole	2	October 21	1	
October 21	"Virginia Beach" ↑	Drake	4	October 21	1	
October 21	"You & Me" ↑	Jennie	7	October 21	1	
October 21	"Calling for You" ↑	Drake featuring 21 Savage	9	October 21	1	
October 21	"Gently" ↑	Drake featuring Bad Bunny	10	October 21	1	
October 28	"Monaco"^{[O]} ↑	Bad Bunny	1	October 28	3	
October 28	"Perro Negro" ↑	Bad Bunny and Feid	4	October 28	2	
October 28	"Fina" ↑	Bad Bunny and Young Miko	6	October 28	1	
October 28	"Si No Estás"^{[O]}	Íñigo Quintero	5	November 4	5	
November 4	"Water"^{[P]}	Tyla	6	December 2	4	
November 11	"Is It Over Now?" ↑	Taylor Swift	1	November 11	3	
November 11	"Now That We Don't Talk" ↑	Taylor Swift	2	November 11	1	
November 11	"Slut!" ↑	Taylor Swift	3	November 11	1	
November 11	"Say Don't Go" ↑	Taylor Swift	4	November 11	1	
November 11	"Style (Taylor's Version)" ↑	Taylor Swift	5	November 11	1	
November 11	"Bad Blood (Taylor's Version)" ↑	Taylor Swift	6	November 11	1	
November 11	"Blank Space (Taylor's Version)" ↑	Taylor Swift	9	November 11	1	
November 18	"Standing Next to You" ↑	Jung Kook	1	November 18	4	
November 18	"Now and Then"	The Beatles	10	November 18	1	
November 25	"Houdini" ↑	Dua Lipa	3	November 25	1	
November 25	"Lalalala" ↑	Stray Kids	10	November 25	1	

=== 2022 peaks ===
List of Billboard Global 200 top ten singles in 2023 that peaked in 2022
Top ten entry date	Single	Artist(s)	Peak	Peak date	Weeks in top ten	Ref.
April 16	"As It Was"^{[B]}^{[C]}^{[E]} ↑	Harry Styles	1	April 16	41	
September 17	"I'm Good (Blue)"^{[B]}	David Guetta and Bebe Rexha	2	September 24	19	
October 8	"Unholy"^{[B]} ↑	Sam Smith and Kim Petras	1	October 8	23	
November 5	"Anti-Hero"^{[B]}^{[D]} ↑	Taylor Swift	1	November 5	14	
November 26	"Made You Look"^{[B]}	Meghan Trainor	6	December 3	3	
December 17	"Creepin'"^{[B]}^{[F]} ↑	Metro Boomin, The Weeknd and 21 Savage	3	December 17	13	

=== 2024 peaks ===
List of Billboard Global 200 top ten singles in 2023 that peaked in 2024
Top ten entry date	Single	Artist(s)	Peak	Peak date	Weeks in top ten	Ref.
November 25	"Lovin on Me" ↑	Jack Harlow	1	January 13	14	

=== Holiday season ===
Holiday titles first making the Billboard Global 200 top ten during the 2022–23 holiday season
Top ten entry date	Single	Artist(s)	Peak	Peak date	Weeks in top ten	Ref.
January 7, 2023	"A Holly Jolly Christmas"	Burl Ives	10	January 7	1	

Holiday titles first making the Billboard Global 200 top ten during the 2023–24 holiday season
Top ten entry date	Single	Artist(s)	Peak	Peak date	Weeks in top ten	Ref.
December 30, 2023	"Let It Snow! Let It Snow! Let It Snow!"	Dean Martin	6	January 6	4	

Recurring holiday titles, appearing in the Billboard Global 200 top ten in previous holiday seasons
Top ten entry date	Single	Artist(s)	Peak	Peak date	Weeks in top ten	Ref.
December 12, 2020	"All I Want for Christmas Is You"^{[P]}	Mariah Carey	1	December 19, 2020	33	
December 12, 2020	"Last Christmas"^{[P]}	Wham!	1	December 20, 2025	30	
December 12, 2020	"Rockin' Around the Christmas Tree"^{[Q]}	Brenda Lee	2	December 24, 2022	27	
December 19, 2020	"Jingle Bell Rock"^{[Q]}	Bobby Helms	4	January 2, 2021	26	
December 19, 2020	"It's Beginning to Look a Lot Like Christmas"^{[R]}	Michael Bublé	6	January 2, 2021	14	
December 26, 2020	"Santa Tell Me"^{[Q]}	Ariana Grande	5	January 2, 2021	20	
January 2, 2021	"It's the Most Wonderful Time of the Year"^{[R]}	Andy Williams	7	January 2, 2021	11	
January 2, 2021	"Underneath the Tree"^{[A]}^{[R]}	Kelly Clarkson	6	December 30, 2023	11	
January 2, 2021	"Feliz Navidad"^{[S]}	José Feliciano	5	January 7, 2023	7	

== Notes ==
^{1} Taylor Swift was the sole artist credited on "Karma" when it debuted on November 5, 2022, for its only week in the top ten prior to its return on June 10, 2023, following the release of a remix featuring Ice Spice, with Ice Spice credited on the song starting June 10, 2023.
^{2} Prior to the chart dated March 11, 2023, "Die for You" was credited to The Weeknd only. "Die for You" entered the top-ten for the first time on March 11, 2023, at its number 2 peak following the release of the Ariana Grande remix.

^{A} The single re-entered the top ten on the week ending January 7, 2023.
^{B} The single re-entered the top ten on the week ending January 14, 2023.
^{C} The single re-entered the top ten on the week ending February 4, 2023.
^{D} The single re-entered the top ten on the week ending March 4, 2023.
^{E} The single re-entered the top ten on the week ending March 18, 2023.
^{F} The single re-entered the top ten on the week ending March 25, 2023.
^{G} The single re-entered the top ten on the week ending June 10, 2023.
^{H} The single re-entered the top ten on the week ending July 1, 2023.
^{I} The single re-entered the top ten on the week ending August 19, 2023.
^{J} The single re-entered the top ten on the week ending September 16, 2023.
^{K} The single re-entered the top ten on the week ending September 23, 2023.
^{L} The single re-entered the top ten on the week ending September 30, 2023.
^{M} The single re-entered the top ten on the week ending October 28, 2023.
^{N} The single re-entered the top ten on the week ending November 4, 2023.
^{O} The single re-entered the top ten on the week ending November 18, 2023.
^{P} The single re-entered the top ten on the week ending December 2, 2023.
^{Q} The single re-entered the top ten on the week ending December 9, 2023.
^{R} The single re-entered the top ten on the week ending December 16, 2023.
^{S} The single re-entered the top ten on the week ending December 30, 2023.
