= No Me Quiero Casar =

Single by Bad Bunny

from the album Nadie Sabe Lo Que Va a Pasar Mañana
- Language: Spanish
- Released: October 31, 2023
- Genre: Latin trap; Alternative hip hop
- Length: 3:46
- Label: Rimas
- Songwriters: Benito Martínez; Marcos Masís; Marco Borrero; Roberto Rosado; Tego Calderón; Llandel Veguilla; Ricardo Garcia; Juan Orengo; Miguel Rodriguez; Francis Rivera; Omar Merced
- Producers: Tainy; MAG; La Paciencia

Bad Bunny singles chronology
"Perro Negro" (2023)	"No Me Quiero Casar" (2023)	"Acho PR" (2024)

Music video
- "No Me Quiero Casar" on YouTube

"No Me Quiero Casar" (transl. I Don't Want To Get Married) is a song by Puerto Rican rapper Bad Bunny, released on October 13, 2023, through Rimas Entertainment, as a track on his fifth solo studio album Nadie Sabe Lo Que Va a Pasar Mañana (2023), with a music video released on December 31, 2023. The song peaked at number 65 on the Billboard Hot 100.

The song samples "Hey Girl" by Frankie Boy and "Al Natural (Remix)" by Tego Calderón and Yandel. Martínez has said that this song is his favourite from its parent album.

== Background and reception ==
On October 9, 2023, Bad Bunny announced his fifth studio album, Nadie Sabe Lo Que Va a Pasar Mañana, as well as its track list, where "No Me Quiero Casar" was included as the sixteenth track. Billboard ranked "No Me Quiero Casar" at number 9 on their list of songs from its parent album, stating that it further solidifies Martinez's preference to remain single, comparing it with his 2022 song Tití Me Preguntó.

== Music video ==
Bad Bunny released the music video for "No Me Quiero Casar" on December 31, 2023, on New Year's Eve. Directed by Stillz, the nearly 10-minute long short film sees him dodging questions about his marital status, while also featuring a cameo from American comedian Marcello Hernández.

== Charts ==
=== Weekly charts ===
Chart performance for "No Me Quiero Casar"
Chart (2023)	Peak position
Argentina Hot 100 (Billboard)	60
Global 200 (Billboard)	48
Spain (PROMUSICAE)	29
US Billboard Hot 100	65
US Hot Latin Songs (Billboard)	19

Chart (2025–2026)	Peak position
Colombia Hot 100 (Billboard)	30
US Hot Latin Rhythm Songs (Billboard)	10

=== Year-end charts ===
2024 year-end chart performance for "No Me Quiero Casar"
Chart (2024)	Position
US Hot Latin Songs (Billboard)	80

== Certifications ==
Certifications for "No Me Quiero Casar"
Region	Certification	Certified units/sales
Spain (Promusicae)	2× Platinum	200,000^{‡}
^{‡} Sales+streaming figures based on certification alone.
