= Nadie Sabe Lo Que Va a Pasar Mañana =

Studio album by Bad Bunny
- Released: October 13, 2023
- Genres: Latin hip-hop; Latin trap; Jersey club; reggaeton
- Length: 81:18
- Language: Spanish
- Label: Rimas
- Producers: Albert Hype; Argel; Buho; Byrd; Chris Jedi; Mick Coogan; Aidan Cullen; DJ Joe; Digital Jet; Edsclusive; Foreign Teck; Frankie; Gaby Music; Hassi; Hydro; La Paciencia; Lanalizer; Mag; Maker; Jon Mili; Sauceman36; Smash David; Stats; Tainy; Zazu

Bad Bunny chronology
Un Verano Sin Ti (2022)	Nadie Sabe Lo Que Va a Pasar Mañana (2023)	Debí Tirar Más Fotos (2025)

Singles from Nadie Sabe Lo Que Va a Pasar Mañana
- 1. "Where She Goes" Released: May 18, 2023; 2. "Un Preview" Released: September 26, 2023; 3. "Monaco" Released: October 13, 2023; 4. "Baticano" Released: October 31, 2023; 5. "Perro Negro" Released: November 17, 2023; 6. "No Me Quiero Casar" Released: December 31, 2023; 7. "Acho PR" Released: March 10, 2024; 8. "Seda" Released: October 13, 2024

Nadie Sabe Lo Que Va a Pasar Mañana (Spanish: [ˈnaðje ˈsaβe lo ke ˈβa a paˈsar maˈɲana]; transl. Nobody Knows What Will Happen Tomorrow, stylized in all uppercase) is the major-label debut solo studio album (sixth overall) by Puerto Rican rapper and singer Bad Bunny. It was released on October 13, 2023, through Rimas, following the release of his previous record Un Verano Sin Ti (2022). It features guest appearances from Arcángel, Bryant Myers, De la Ghetto, Eladio Carrión, Feid, Luar la L, Mora, Ñengo Flow, Young Miko, and YovngChimi.

At the 67th Grammy Awards, it was nominated for Best Música Urbana Album. To promote the album, Bad Bunny embarked on the Most Wanted Tour in 2024.

== Background and singles ==
His fourth studio album Un Verano Sin Ti was released on May 6, 2022, and went on to top the US Billboard 200 for 13 non-consecutive weeks, becoming his most successful album to date. Additionally, it was widely regarded as one of the most critically acclaimed albums of 2022 by the end of the year. In December 2022, he announced that he would take an extended break throughout 2023 which eventually resulted in a five-month long social media break. During this break, Martínez remained active by headlining his Coachella 2023 set and releasing a collaboration with Grupo Frontera titled "Un x100to".

He returned to social media on May 15, 2023, and announced the lead single "Where She Goes" only three days later. The track blends "elements of dembow and Jersey club" and proved another commercial success for the singer, reaching the top-ten in ten countries. The second single and "possible last song" of 2023 "Un Preview" was released on September 26, and poses a "small preview of what is coming" in 2024, according to the musician himself.

A first allusion to the album title was made at the end of the music video of "Where She Goes" with a billboard displaying the phrase "Nadie sabe...". In early October, similar billboards reading "Nadie sabe si será este año o el próximo" ("No one knows if it will be this year or next") by Spotify appeared in Mexico, Colombia, Chile, and Argentina. The shortened title would then occupy his biography section on Twitter on October 8. In addition, the musician would wipe his Instagram account and post a tracklist of 22 songs, each described as "fuego". In an interview for the October 2023 issue of Vanity Fair, it was revealed that the album would be released in fall 2023. Fluctuating between Los Angeles and Puerto Rico, he has been "experimenting with a new musical mood", citing music of the 1970s across genres "in both Spanish and English" as his main influences. The artist also promised the next album, set to be his most personal yet, to not sound like its predecessor, as he is "always going to look for a way to do something new". On October 9, Martínez shared an album trailer and announced the full album title along with its release date.

== Composition ==
Nadie Sabe Lo Que Va a Pasar Mañana is primarily a Latin trap and reggaeton album that expands on the sound Bad Bunny built early on in his career, with additional influences of Jersey club, house, drill, hip-hop, avant-garde, electronic, ballad, dancehall, reggae, dembow, hyperpop, sandungueo, synth-pop, R&B, orchestra, and symphonic.

== Critical reception ==
Professional ratings
Aggregate scores
Source	Rating
Metacritic	82/100
Review scores
Source	Rating
AllMusic	4/5 stars
Evening Standard	4/5 stars
Financial Times	2/5 stars
NME	4/5 stars
Pitchfork	7.4/10

On review aggregator Metacritic, Nadie Sabe Lo Que Va a Pasar Mañana received a score of 82 out of 100 based on 5 reviews, indicating "universal acclaim".

Lucas Villa of NME called the album "a sonically diverse odyssey" and wrote that Bad Bunny "returns to his Latin trap roots while exploring genres like Jersey club, drill, and house music", although felt that "the trap on an album this long does get monotonous, but he shines brightest when he goes off the beaten path". Isabella Herrera of Pitchfork felt that the material on Nadie Sabe is "just as horny and cavalier" as Bad Bunny's best work and "functions like a rap homecoming", finding it "bloated but thematically focused, centered on some of Benito's favorite topics: fucking, counting racks, his love of Puerto Rico".

Thania Garcia of Variety wrote that the first half of the record "is much more theatrical and pensive" compared to the handful, which described as a "flaring trap bangers that shape up its ending". Garcia also pointed out that the rapper reflections in the lyrics sometimes become "juvenile" and that "he addresses pretty much every headline about him".

Suzy Exposito of Los Angeles Times noticed that the rapper "has been hunkered down on the defensive too long" from the world, and that "the cold, brutalist tower he's built in Nadie Sabe stands in contrast to the wellspring of rich, modern-day Puerto Rican storytelling" of the previous works.

== Commercial performance ==
Nadie Sabe Lo Que Va a Pasar Mañana debuted at No. 1 on the Billboard 200 dated October 28, 2023, earning 184,000 album-equivalent units in the US in the week ending October 19. Almost all of the figure were streams, with all 21 eligible songs charting on the Billboard Hot 100.

== Track listing ==
Credits adapted from Apple Music and Tidal.

Nadie Sabe Lo Que Va a Pasar Mañana track listing
No.	Title	Writer(s)	Producer(s)	Length
1.	"Nadie Sabe"	Benito Martínez; Carlos Eleta Almarán; Marcos Masís; Roberto Rosado; Carlos López	Tainy; La Paciencia; C. López; Mag	6:19
2.	"Monaco"	Martínez; Charles Aznavour; Marco Borrero; Samuel Jiménez; Edward Davadi; Armando Cuesta; Rosado	Mag; Smash David; Edsclusive; Argel Beatz; La Paciencia	4:27
3.	"Fina" (with Young Miko)	Martínez; María Ramírez; Tegui Calderón; Miguel Montoya; Hector Pagan; Borrero; Rosado; Jiménez; Nico Baran; Michael Hernandez; Rosario Joselly; Cuesta; Amaury López; Mariana López; Stephane Reibaldi	Mag; La Paciencia; Smash David; Argel Beatz; Patron; Baran; Foreign Teck; DJ Joe; Mauro	3:36
4.	"Hibiki" (with Mora)	Martínez; Gabriel Mora; Kamil Assad; Marcos Masís; Harry Ramos; Julian Betancourt; Rosado; Machael Cole; Mario Torres	Tainy; Hassi; La Paciencia; Machael; Twobitmario; Tob; Mag	3:28
5.	"Mr. October"	Martínez; Héctor Ramos; Borrero; Rosado; Jesús Pino; Brian Marmolejos; Daniel Wahlberg	Hydro; Mag; La Paciencia; Stats; Sauceman36	3:09
6.	"Cybertruck"	Martínez; Borrero; Rosado; Davide Grigolo	Mag; La Paciencia; Zazu	3:12
7.	"Vou 787"	Martínez; Borrero; Rosado; Tokischa Peralta; Madonna Ciccone; Robert Pettibone	Bad Bunny (Note: Although he is not officially credited, Bad Bunny revealed in an Instagram livestream to commemorate the album's release that he helped with adding the sample of "Vogue" by Madonna:); Mag; La Paciencia	2:04
8.	"Seda" (with Bryant Myers)	Martínez; Bryant Rohena; Borrero; Rosado; Carlos Ortiz Rivera; Juan Rivera; Yan Carlo Guzman; Iann Rohena	Mag; La Paciencia; Chris Jedi; Lanalizer; Gaby Music; Búho	3:10
9.	"Gracias por Nada"	Martínez; B. Rohena; Borrero; Ortiz Rivera; J. Rivera; Rosado	Mag; Chris Jedi; Gaby Music; La Paciencia	2:57
10.	"Teléfono Nuevo" (with Luar la L)	Martínez; Raúl del Valle; Borrero; Rosado; Jiménez; Cuesta	Mag; La Paciencia; Smash David; Argel Beatz	5:55
11.	"Baby Nueva"	Martínez; Marcos Masís; Alberto Melendez; Rosado	Tainy; Albert Hype; La Paciencia; Mag	4:01
12.	"Mercedes Carota" (with YovngChimi)	Martínez; Ángel Avilés; Marcos Masís; Borrero; Jiménez; Leutrim Beqiri; Rosado	Tainy; Mag; Smash David; Byrd	3:23
13.	"Los Pits"	Martínez; Borrero; Rosado; Jiménez; Sean Turk; Michael Johnson; Hernandez	Mag; La Paciencia; Smash David; Turk; TheOwnlyHope; Foreign Teck	4:11
14.	"Vuelve Candy B"	Martínez; Borrero; Rosado; Martin Coogan; Aidan Cullen	Mag; La Paciencia; Mick Coogan; Cullen	4:26
15.	"Baticano"	Martínez; Marcos Masís; Borrero; Rosado	Tainy; Mag; La Paciencia	4:16
16.	"No Me Quiero Casar"	Martínez; Marcos Masís; Borrero; Rosado; Calderón; Llandel Veguilla; Ricardo Garcia; Juan Orengo; Miguel Rodriguez; Francis Rivera; Omar Merced	Tainy; Mag; La Paciencia	3:46
17.	"Where She Goes"	Martínez; Borrero; Rosado	Mag	3:52
18.	"Thunder y Lightning" (with Eladio Carrión)	Martínez; Eladio Carrión; Borrero; Rosado; Coogan; Scotty Dittrich	Mag; La Paciencia; Coogan; Dittrich	3:37
19.	"Perro Negro" (with Feid)	Martínez; Salomón Villada; Borrero; Rosado; Jiménez; Cuesta; Marlon Orrego; Frank Packer; Jonathan Zibi	Mag; La Paciencia; Smash David; Argel Beatz; Jon Mili; Frankie; Digital Jet	2:43
20.	"Europa :(" (^{[a]})	Martínez; Marcos Masís; Rosado	Tainy; La Paciencia; Mag	0:12
21.	"Acho PR" (with Arcángel, De la Ghetto and Ñengo Flow)	Martínez; Austin Santos; Rafael Castillo; Edwin Rosa; Julio Ramos; Norman Howell; Marcos Masís; Michael Masís; Borrero; Rosado	Tainy; Mvsis; Mag; La Paciencia	6:00
22.	"Un Preview"	Martínez; Marcos Masís; Borrero; Rosado	Tainy; Mag; La Paciencia	2:46
Total length:				81:30

Notes

- "Monaco" contains a sample of "Hier encore", written and performed by Charles Aznavour.
- "Fina" contains elements of "Pa' Que Retozen", written and performed by Tego Calderón.
- "Vou 787" contains a sample of "Vogue", written by Madonna and Shep Pettibone, and performed by Madonna.
- "Seda" contains an uncredited interpolation of "Codeine Crazy", written by Nayvadius Wilburn and Bryan Simmons, and performed by Future.
- "No Me Quiero Casar" contains samples of "Hey Girl", written by Francisco Bautista, as performed by Frankie Boy, and "Al Natural" (remix), written and performed by Tego Calderón and Yandel.
- ^{^[a]} "Europa :(" was updated as "Europa :)" on April 28, 2025.
- "Acho PR" contains elements of "Chévere", written by Julio Ramos, Norman Howell and Marco Masís, as performed by Voltio and Notch.

== Personnel ==
=== Vocals ===
- Bad Bunny – lead vocals
- Young Miko – vocals (3)
- Mora – vocals (4)
- Bryant Myers – vocals (8)
- Luar la L – vocals (10)
- YovngChimi – vocals (12)
- Eladio Carrión – vocals (18)
- Feid – vocals (19)
- Arcángel – vocals (21)
- De la Ghetto – vocals (21)
- Ñengo Flow – vocals (21)

=== Technical ===
- Carlos López – conductor (1)
- Colin Leonard – mastering
- Josh Gudwin – mixing
- Stillz – art direction, design
- Zachariah O'Hora – illustration
- Zoran Orlic – photography

== Charts ==
=== Weekly charts ===
Weekly chart performance for Nadie Sabe Lo Que Va a Pasar Mañana
Chart (2023)	Peak position
Austrian Albums (Ö3 Austria)	36
Belgian Albums (Ultratop Flanders)	24
Belgian Albums (Ultratop Wallonia)	13
Canadian Albums (Billboard)	4
Dutch Albums (Album Top 100)	6
French Albums (SNEP)	12
German Albums (Offizielle Top 100)	43
Irish Albums (Official Charts)	28
Italian Albums (FIMI)	2
Lithuanian Albums (AGATA)	86
Norwegian Albums (VG-lista)	29
Portuguese Albums (AFP)	30
Spanish Albums (Promusicae)	1
Swiss Albums (Schweizer Hitparade)	1
UK Albums (Official Charts)	70
US Billboard 200	1
US Independent Albums (Billboard)	1
US Top Latin Albums (Billboard)	1
US Latin Rhythm Albums (Billboard)	1

=== Year-end charts ===
2023 year-end chart performance for Nadie Sabe Lo Que Va a Pasar Mañana
Chart (2023)	Position
Spanish Albums (PROMUSICAE)	4
Swiss Albums (Schweizer Hitparade)	67

2024 year-end chart performance for Nadie Sabe Lo Que Va a Pasar Mañana
Chart (2024)	Position
Portuguese Albums (AFP)	137
US Billboard 200	17

== Certifications ==
Certifications and sales for Nadie Sabe Lo Que Va a Pasar Mañana
Region	Certification	Certified units/sales
France (SNEP)	Gold	50,000^{‡}
Italy (FIMI)	Platinum	50,000^{‡}
Portugal (AFP)	Gold	3,500^{‡}
Spain (Promusicae)	4× Platinum	160,000^{‡}
^{‡} Sales+streaming figures based on certification alone.

== See also ==
- 2023 in Latin music
- List of number-one Billboard Latin Albums from the 2020s
- List of number-one Billboard Latin Rhythm Albums of 2023
- List of number-one Billboard Latin Rhythm Albums of 2024
