= Mr. October (song) =

2023 song by Bad Bunny

Song by Bad Bunny

from the album Nadie Sabe Lo Que Va a Pasar Mañana
- Language: Spanish
- Released: October 13, 2023
- Genre: Latin trap
- Length: 3:09
- Label: Rimas
- Songwriter: Benito Martínez
- Producers: Hydro; La Paciencia; Mag; Sauceman36; Stats Money Wayy

Visualizer
- "Mr. October" on YouTube

"Mr. October" is a song by Puerto Rican rapper Bad Bunny. It was released on October 13, 2023, through Rimas Entertainment, as part of Bad Bunny's fifth studio album, Nadie Sabe Lo Que Va a Pasar Mañana. The song was written by Benito Martínez and with Hydro, La Paciencia, Mag, Sauceman36 and Stats Money Wayy handling the production, who were also marked as songwriters. The song title refers to baseball legend Reggie Jackson, whom Bad Bunny name-checks along with other legends.

== Background and release ==
On October 9, 2023, Bad Bunny announced his album Nadie Sabe Lo Que Va a Pasar Mañana, and "Mr. October" was included as the album's fourth track.

== Commercial performance ==
Following the releasing of Nadie Sabe Lo Que Va a Pasar Mañana, "Mr. October" appeared at number 28 on the US Billboard Hot 100 chart upon the issue date of October 28, 2023. The song also charted at number six on the US Hot Latin Songs chart upon the issue date of October 28, 2023. On the Billboard Global 200 chart, it debuted at number 19 on the chart dated October 28, 2023. "Mr. October" peaked at number 13 in Spain's official chart. It appeared also in the Billboard charts in Bolivia (12), Chile (22), Colombia (14), Ecuador (13), Peru (17), Mexico (19) and Argentina (81).

== Critical reception ==
Billboard ranked "Mr. October" at number 16 on their list of songs from Nadie Sabe Lo Que Va a Pasar Mañana, stating that Bad Bunny is rapping "over a repetitive yet evocative keyboard riff and drums".

== Live performances ==
"Mr. October" was included on the set list as the opening song for Bad Bunny's Most Wanted Tour.

== Audio visualizer ==
The audio visualizer was uploaded to YouTube on Bad Bunny's channel on October 13, 2023, along with the other audio visualizer videos that premiered simultaneously with the release of Nadie Sabe Lo Que Va a Pasar Mañana.

== Charts ==
Chart performance for "Mr. October"
Chart (2023)	Peak position
Argentina Hot 100 (Billboard)	81
Bolivia (Billboard)	12
Chile (Billboard)	22
Colombia (Billboard)	14
Ecuador (Billboard)	13
Global 200 (Billboard)	19
Mexico (Billboard)	19
Peru (Billboard)	17
Spain (PROMUSICAE)	13
US Billboard Hot 100	28
US Hot Latin Songs (Billboard)	6

== Certifications ==
Certifications and sales for "Mr. October"
Region	Certification	Certified units/sales
Spain (Promusicae)	Gold	30,000^{‡}
^{‡} Sales+streaming figures based on certification alone.
