= Teléfono Nuevo =

2023 song by Bad Bunny and Luar la L

Song by Bad Bunny and Luar la L

from the album Nadie Sabe Lo Que Va a Pasar Mañana
- Language: Spanish
- Released: October 13, 2023
- Genre: Latin trap
- Length: 5:54
- Label: Rimas
- Songwriters: Benito Martínez; Raúl del Valle
- Producers: Smash David; Mag; La Paciencia; Argel

Visualizer
- "Teléfono Nuevo" on YouTube

"Teléfono Nuevo" is a song by Puerto Rican rappers Bad Bunny and Luar la L. It was released on October 13, 2023, through Rimas Entertainment, as part of Bad Bunny's fifth studio album, Nadie Sabe Lo Que Va a Pasar Mañana. The song was written by Bad Bunny and Luar la L with Chris Jedi, Gaby Music, Lanalizer, La Paciencia, Mag and Búho handling the production, who were also marked as songwriters.

== Background and release ==
On October 9, 2023, Bad Bunny announced his album Nadie Sabe Lo Que Va a Pasar Mañana, and "Teléfono Nuevo" was included as the album's tenth track. This was the second collaboration between both rappers since "100 Millones".

== Commercial performance ==
Following the releasing of Nadie Sabe Lo Que Va a Pasar Mañana, "Teléfono Nuevo" appeared at number 32 on the US Billboard Hot 100 chart upon the issue date of October 28, 2023, which was Luar la L's first entry on the chart. The song also charted at number 8 on the US Hot Latin Songs chart upon the issue date of October 28, 2023. On the Billboard Global 200 chart, it debuted at number 18 on the chart dated October 28, 2023. "Teléfono Nuevo" peaked at number 11 in Spain's official chart. It appeared also in the Billboard charts in Bolivia (24), Chile (12), Colombia (8), Ecuador (10), Peru (11), Mexico (21) and Argentina (86).

== Critical reception ==
Billboard ranked "Teléfono Nuevo" at number seven on their list of songs from Nadie Sabe Lo Que Va a Pasar Mañana, stating that it "begins with a soft keyboard melody and transitions into a more upbeat pop beat, before giving way to hard rap production".

== Live performances ==
The song was included on the set list for Bad Bunny's Most Wanted Tour.

== Audio visualizer ==
The audio visualizer was uploaded to YouTube on Bad Bunny's channel on October 13, 2023, along with the other audio visualizer videos that premiered simultaneously with the release of Nadie Sabe Lo Que Va a Pasar Mañana.

== Charts ==
Chart performance for "Teléfono Nuevo"
Chart (2023)	Peak position
Argentina Hot 100 (Billboard)	86
Bolivia (Billboard)	24
Chile (Billboard)	13
Colombia (Billboard)	8
Ecuador (Billboard)	10
Global 200 (Billboard)	16
Mexico (Billboard)	21
Peru (Billboard)	11
Spain (PROMUSICAE)	11
US Billboard Hot 100	32
US Hot Latin Songs (Billboard)	8

== Certifications ==
Certifications for "Teléfono Nuevo"
Region	Certification	Certified units/sales
Spain (Promusicae)	Platinum	100,000^{‡}
^{‡} Sales+streaming figures based on certification alone.
