= Mercedes Carota =

2023 song by Bad Bunny and Yovngchimi

Song by Bad Bunny and Yovngchimi

from the album Nadie Sabe Lo Que Va a Pasar Mañana
- Language: Spanish
- Released: October 13, 2023
- Genre: Latin trap; gangsta rap
- Length: 3:22
- Label: Rimas
- Songwriters: Benito Martínez; Ángel Avilés; Marco Masís; Samuel Jimenez; José Rosado; Leutrim Beqiri; Marco Borrero
- Producers: Tainy; Mag; Smash David; Byrd

Visualizer
- "Mercedes Carota" on YouTube

"Mercedes Carota" is a song by Puerto Rican rappers Bad Bunny and Yovngchimi. It was released on October 13, 2023, through Rimas Entertainment, as part of Bad Bunny's fifth studio album, Nadie Sabe Lo Que Va a Pasar Mañana. The song was written by Bad Bunny and Yovngchimi with Tainy, Smash David, Mag and Byrg handling the production, who were also marked as songwriters.

== Background and release ==
On October 9, 2023, Bad Bunny announced his album Nadie Sabe Lo Que Va a Pasar Mañana, and "Mercedes Carota" was included as the album's 12th track. This was the first collaboration between the two rappers.

== Commercial performance ==
Following the releasing of Nadie Sabe Lo Que Va a Pasar Mañana, "Mercedes Carota" appeared at number 57 on the US Billboard Hot 100 chart upon the issue date of October 28, 2023, which was Yovngchimi's first entry on the chart. The song also charted at number 16 on the US Hot Latin Songs chart upon the issue date of October 28, 2023. On the Billboard Global 200 chart, it debuted at number 36 on the chart dated October 28, 2023. "Mercedes Carota" peaked at number 23 in Spain's official chart. It appeared also in the Billboard charts in Colombia (19), Ecuador (18) and Peru (20).

== Critical reception ==
Billboard described "Mercedes Carota" as an "ominous soundscape, underpinned by menacing trap beats and a blend of unapologetic lyricism". The appearance of Yovngchimi is "a dark, no-nonsense edge that’s perfect for fueling more hustle."

== Live performances ==
The song was included on the set list for Bad Bunny's Most Wanted Tour.

== Audio visualizer ==
The audio visualizer was uploaded to YouTube on Bad Bunny's channel on October 13, 2023, along with the other audio visualizer videos that premiered simultaneously with the release of Nadie Sabe Lo Que Va a Pasar Mañana.

== Charts ==
Chart performance for "Mercedes Carota"
Chart (2023)	Peak position
Colombia (Billboard)	19
Ecuador (Billboard)	18
Global 200 (Billboard)	35
Peru (Billboard)	20
Spain (PROMUSICAE)	23
US Billboard Hot 100	57
US Hot Latin Songs (Billboard)	16

== Certifications ==
Certifications for "Mercedes Carota"
Region	Certification	Certified units/sales
Spain (Promusicae)	Gold	30,000^{‡}
^{‡} Sales+streaming figures based on certification alone.
