= Un Preview =

Single by Bad Bunny

from the album Nadie Sabe Lo Que Va a Pasar Mañana
- Language: Spanish
- English title: "A Preview"
- Released: September 26, 2023
- Genre: Reggaeton
- Length: 2:46
- Label: Rimas
- Songwriter: Benito Martínez
- Producers: Tainy; La Paciencia; MAG

Bad Bunny singles chronology
"K-pop" (2023)	"Un Preview" (2023)	"Monaco" (2023)

Music video
- "Un Preview" on YouTube

"Un Preview" (English: A Preview) is a reggaeton song by Puerto Rican rapper Bad Bunny. It was released on September 26, 2023, through Rimas Entertainment, as the second single from his fifth studio album Nadie Sabe Lo Que Va a Pasar Mañana (2023).

== Background and release ==
After the release of his successful album Un Verano Sin Ti, Bad Bunny had hits with his solo song "Where She Goes" and his collaboration with Travis Scott and the Weeknd, "K-pop". On September 20, 2023, the singer announced a preview of the song on his WhatsApp. The single was released on September 26, 2023, on all digital platforms, and also as a preview of his upcoming fifth solo studio album and sixth overall. The song is also considered "his last song of 2023" since the singer had announced that he would not make music and would continue resting until 2024.

== Critical reception ==
Billboard ranked "Un Preview" as the eighth best song on Nadie Sabe Lo Que Va a Pasar Mañana, calling it "the song that lived up to its name".

== Music video ==
The music video was released on Bad Bunny's official YouTube channel on September 26, 2023, at the same time as the single. In it, Bad Bunny appears with a very simple look, but some jewelry. While in the background you can see totally white on some occasions, sometimes accompanied by a Rolls Royce or a mechanical horse.

== Charts ==
Chart performance for "Un Preview"
Chart (2023)	Peak position
Argentina Hot 100 (Billboard)	38
Bolivia (Billboard)	12
Canada Hot 100 (Billboard)	77
Chile (Billboard)	6
Colombia (Billboard)	10
Ecuador (Billboard)	4
Global 200 (Billboard)	13
Italy (FIMI)	93
Mexico (Billboard)	17
Netherlands (Single Tip)	24
Peru (Billboard)	10
Portugal (AFP)	72
Spain (PROMUSICAE)	5
Switzerland (Schweizer Hitparade)	33
US Billboard Hot 100	43
US Hot Latin Songs (Billboard)	2
US Latin Airplay (Billboard)	24

== Certifications ==
Certifications and sales for "Un Preview"
Region	Certification	Certified units/sales
Spain (PROMUSICAE)	Platinum	60,000^{‡}
^{‡} Sales+streaming figures based on certification alone.
