= Seda (song) =

2023 song by Bad Bunny and Bryant Myers

Song by Bad Bunny and Bryant Myers

from the album Nadie Sabe Lo Que Va a Pasar Mañana
- Language: Spanish
- Released: October 13, 2023
- Genre: Latin trap
- Length: 3:10
- Label: Rimas
- Songwriters: Benito Martínez; Bryan Rohena; Carlos Ortiz; Juan Rivera; Gian Guzmán; Iann Rohena; José Rosado
- Producers: Chris Jedi; Gaby Music; Mag; La Paciencia; Búho

Visualizer
- "Seda" on YouTube

"Seda" is a song by Puerto Rican rappers Bad Bunny and Bryant Myers. It was released on October 13, 2023, through Rimas Entertainment, as part of Bad Bunny's fifth studio album, Nadie Sabe Lo Que Va a Pasar Mañana. The song was written by Bad Bunny and Bryant Myers with Chris Jedi, Gaby Music, Lanalizer, La Paciencia, Mag and Búho handling the production, who were also marked as songwriters.

== Background and release ==
On October 9, 2023, Bad Bunny announced his album Nadie Sabe Lo Que Va a Pasar Mañana, and "Seda" was included as the album's eight track. Both rappers previously collaborated on multiple songs including "Pa Ti", "Un Ratito Más" and "Triste".

== Commercial performance ==
Following the releasing of Nadie Sabe Lo Que Va a Pasar Mañana, "Seda" appeared at number 38 on the US Billboard Hot 100 chart upon the issue date of October 28, 2023, which was Bryant Myers' first entry on the chart. The song also charted at number 10 on the US Hot Latin Songs chart upon the issue date of October 28, 2023. On the Billboard Global 200 chart, it debuted at number 16 on the chart dated October 28, 2023. "Seda" peaked at number 6 in Spain's official chart. It appeared also in the Billboard charts in Bolivia (22), Chile (12), Colombia (9), Ecuador (12), Peru (12), Mexico (22) and Argentina (72).

== Critical reception ==
Billboard described "Seda" as an "ultra-sensual, slow-paced trap song" about staying busy with a girl that's turned their worlds upside down.

== Audio visualizer ==
The audio visualizer was uploaded to YouTube on Bad Bunny's channel on October 13, 2023, along with the other audio visualizer videos that premiered simultaneously with the release of Nadie Sabe Lo Que Va a Pasar Mañana.

== Charts ==
Chart performance for "Seda"
Chart (2023)	Peak position
Argentina Hot 100 (Billboard)	72
Bolivia (Billboard)	22
Chile (Billboard)	12
Colombia (Billboard)	9
Ecuador (Billboard)	12
Global 200 (Billboard)	16
Mexico (Billboard)	22
Peru (Billboard)	12
Spain (PROMUSICAE)	6
US Billboard Hot 100	38
US Hot Latin Songs (Billboard)	10

== Certifications ==
Certifications for "Seda"
Region	Certification	Certified units/sales
Spain (Promusicae)	2× Platinum	200,000^{‡}
^{‡} Sales+streaming figures based on certification alone.
