= Thunder y Lightning =

2023 song by Bad Bunny and Eladio Carrión

Song by Bad Bunny and Eladio Carrión

from the album Nadie Sabe Lo Que Va a Pasar Mañana
- Language: Spanish
- Released: October 13, 2023
- Genre: Drill; Latin trap
- Length: 3:37
- Label: Rimas
- Songwriters: Benito Martínez; Eladio Carrión
- Producers: Mick Coogan; Scotty Dittrich; La Paciencia; Mag

Visualizer
- "Thunder y Lightning" on YouTube

"Thunder y Lightning" is a song by Puerto Rican rappers Bad Bunny and Eladio Carrión. It was released on October 13, 2023, through Rimas Entertainment, as part of Bad Bunny's fifth studio album, Nadie Sabe Lo Que Va a Pasar Mañana. The song was written by Bad Bunny and Eladio Carrión with Mick Coogan, Scotty Dittrich, la Paciencia and Mag handling the production.

== Background and release ==
On October 9, 2023, Bad Bunny announced his album Nadie Sabe Lo Que Va a Pasar Mañana, and "Thunder y Lightning" was included as the album's 18th track. This was the third collaboration between both rappers including "Kemba Walker" and "Coco Chanel".

== Commercial performance ==
Following the releasing of Nadie Sabe Lo Que Va a Pasar Mañana, "Thunder y Lightning" appeared at number 80 on the US Billboard Hot 100 chart upon the issue date of October 28, 2023. The song also charted at number 23 on the US Hot Latin Songs chart upon the issue date of October 28, 2023. On the Billboard Global 200 chart, it debuted at number 49 on the chart dated October 28, 2023. "Thunder y Lightning" peaked at number 15 in Spain's official chart. It appeared also in the Billboard chart Colombia at number 18.

== Critical reception ==
Billboard ranked "Thunder y Lightning" at number fifth on their list of songs from Nadie Sabe Lo Que Va a Pasar Mañana, stating that it "introduces a relentless drill beat infused with a sinister flair, featuring sliding bass lines that electrify with their combined raw power".

== Live performances ==
The song was included on the set list for Bad Bunny's Most Wanted Tour.

== Audio visualizer ==
The audio visualizer was uploaded to YouTube on Bad Bunny's channel on October 13, 2023, along with the other audio visualizer videos that premiered simultaneously with the release of Nadie Sabe Lo Que Va a Pasar Mañana.

== Charts ==
Chart performance for "Thunder y Lightning"
Chart (2023)	Peak position
Colombia (Billboard)	18
Global 200 (Billboard)	49
Spain (PROMUSICAE)	15
US Billboard Hot 100	80
US Hot Latin Songs (Billboard)	23

== Certifications ==
Certifications and sales for "Thunder y Lightning"
Region	Certification	Certified units/sales
Spain (Promusicae)	Platinum	60,000^{‡}
^{‡} Sales+streaming figures based on certification alone.
