= Baby Nueva =

2023 song by Bad Bunny

Song by Bad Bunny

from the album Nadie Sabe Lo Que Va a Pasar Mañana
- Language: Spanish
- Released: October 13, 2023
- Genre: Latin trap; deep house
- Length: 4:00
- Label: Rimas
- Songwriter: Benito Martínez
- Producers: Albert Hype; Mag; La Paciencia

Visualizer
- "Baby Nueva" on YouTube

"Baby Nueva" is a song by Puerto Rican rapper Bad Bunny. It was released on October 13, 2023, through Rimas Entertainment, as part of Bad Bunny's fifth studio album, Nadie Sabe Lo Que Va a Pasar Mañana. The song was written by Benito Martínez with Albert Hype, La Paciencia and Mag handling the production, who were also marked as songwriters.

== Background and release ==
On October 9, 2023, Bad Bunny announced his album Nadie Sabe Lo Que Va a Pasar Mañana, and "Baby Nueva" was included as the album's eleventh track.

== Commercial performance ==
Following the releasing of Nadie Sabe Lo Que Va a Pasar Mañana, "Baby Nueva" appeared at number 34 on the US Billboard Hot 100 chart upon the issue date of October 28, 2023. The song also charted at number 15 on the US Hot Latin Songs chart upon the issue date of October 28, 2023. On the Billboard Global 200 chart, it debuted at number 14 on the chart dated October 28, 2023. "Baby Nueva" peaked at number 21 in Spain's official chart. It appeared also in the Billboard charts in Bolivia (9), Colombia (16), Ecuador (8), Mexico (14), Peru (10) and Argentina Hot 100 (87).

== Critical reception ==
Billboard ranked "Baby Nueva" at number 20 on their list of songs from Nadie Sabe Lo Que Va a Pasar Mañana describing that the song is starting "with an staccato bass synth that evolves into an electro-hop mix".

== Audio visualizer ==
The audio visualizer was uploaded to YouTube on Bad Bunny's channel on October 13, 2023, along with the other audio visualizer videos that premiered simultaneously with the release of Nadie Sabe Lo Que Va a Pasar Mañana.

== Charts ==
Chart performance for "Baby Nueva"
Chart (2023)	Peak position
Argentina Hot 100 (Billboard)	87
Bolivia (Billboard)	9
Colombia (Billboard)	16
Ecuador (Billboard)	8
Global 200 (Billboard)	15
Mexico (Billboard)	14
Peru (Billboard)	10
Spain (PROMUSICAE)	14
US Billboard Hot 100	34
US Hot Latin Songs (Billboard)	9

== Certifications ==
Certifications for "Baby Nueva"
Region	Certification	Certified units/sales
Spain (Promusicae)	Gold	30,000^{‡}
^{‡} Sales+streaming figures based on certification alone.
