= Nadie Sabe =

2023 song by Bad Bunny

Song by Bad Bunny

from the album Nadie Sabe Lo Que Va a Pasar Mañana
- Language: Spanish
- Released: October 13, 2023
- Genre: Latin hip hop
- Length: 6:14
- Label: Rimas
- Songwriters: Benito Martínez; Carlos Eleta; Marco Masís; Roberto Rosado; Carlos López
- Producers: Tainy; Mag

Visualizer
- "Nadie Sabe" on YouTube

"Nadie Sabe" is a song by Puerto Rican rapper Bad Bunny. It was released on October 13, 2023, through Rimas Entertainment, as part of Bad Bunny's fifth studio album, Nadie Sabe Lo Que Va a Pasar Mañana. The song was written by Bad Bunny and with Tainy, La Paciencia and Mag handling the production, who were also marked as songwriters. It contains a sample of the song "Histoire d'un amour", by Dalida.

== Background and release ==
On October 9, 2023, Bad Bunny announced his album Nadie Sabe Lo Que Va a Pasar Mañana, and "Nadie Sabe" was included as the album's opening track.

== Commercial performance ==
Following the releasing of Nadie Sabe Lo Que Va a Pasar Mañana, "Nadie Sabe" appeared at number 22 on the US Billboard Hot 100 chart upon the issue date of October 28, 2023. The song also charted at number four on the US Hot Latin Songs chart upon the issue date of October 28, 2023. On the Billboard Global 200 chart, it debuted at number 12 on the chart dated October 28, 2023. "Nadie Sabe" peaked at number 7 in Spain's official chart. It appeared also in the Billboard charts in Bolivia (12), Chile (14), Colombia (5), Ecuador (5), Peru (8), Mexico (15), Switzerland (55) and Argentina (59).

== Critical reception ==
Billboard ranked "Nadie Sabe" at number three on their list of songs from Nadie Sabe Lo Que Va a Pasar Mañana, stating that it "sets the tone of [Bad] Bunny’s new album with a brooding, symphonic backdrop and otherworldly choruses".

== Live performances ==
"Nadie Sabe" was included on the set list as the opening song for Bad Bunny's Most Wanted Tour.

== Audio visualizer ==
The audio visualizer was uploaded to YouTube on Bad Bunny's channel on October 13, 2023, along with the other audio visualizer videos that premiered simultaneously with the release of Nadie Sabe Lo Que Va a Pasar Mañana.

== Charts ==
Chart performance for "Nadie Sabe"
Chart (2023)	Peak position
Argentina Hot 100 (Billboard)	59
Bolivia (Billboard)	12
Chile (Billboard)	14
Colombia (Billboard)	5
Ecuador (Billboard)	5
Global 200 (Billboard)	12
Mexico (Billboard)	15
Peru (Billboard)	8
Spain (PROMUSICAE)	7
Switzerland (Schweizer Hitparade)	55
US Billboard Hot 100	22
US Hot Latin Songs (Billboard)	4

== Certifications ==
Certifications for "Nadie Sabe"
Region	Certification	Certified units/sales
Spain (Promusicae)	Platinum	100,000^{‡}
^{‡} Sales+streaming figures based on certification alone.
