= Acho PR =

Single by Bad Bunny, Arcángel, De la Ghetto and Ñengo Flow

from the album Nadie Sabe Lo Que Va a Pasar Mañana
- Language: Spanish
- Released: March 10, 2024
- Recorded: 2021
- Genre: Latin hip hop
- Length: 6:00
- Label: Rimas
- Songwriters: Benito Martínez; Austin Santos; Rafael Castillo; Edwin Rosa; Julio Ramos; Norman Howell; Marco Masís; Marco Borrero; Roberto Rosado
- Producers: Tainy; Mvsis; Mag; La Paciencia

Bad Bunny singles chronology
"No Me Quiero Casar" (2023)	"Acho PR" (2024)	"Adivino" (2024)

Music video
- "Acho PR" on YouTube

"Acho PR" is a song by Bad Bunny, Arcángel, De la Ghetto and Ñengo Flow from Bad Bunny's fifth solo studio album Nadie Sabe Lo Que Va a Pasar Mañana (2023). It was released as a single through Rimas Entertainment on March 10, 2024.

== Background and release ==
Bad Bunny previously collaborated with said singers on the song. On October 9, 2023, Bad Bunny announced his fifth studio album, Nadie Sabe Lo Que Va a Pasar Mañana, and revealed the track list, and "Acho PR" was included as the twenty-first track.

== Music and lyrics ==
"Acho PR" serves as the 21st track off Nadie Sabe Lo Que Va a Pasar Mañana, with the 20th track "Europa :(" being referred to as a spoken word interlude that serves as an intro to the former. The lyrics also have reference to Bad Bunny's ex-partner, Gabriela Berlingeri.

== Critical reception ==
Billboard ranked "Acho PR" as the best song on Nadie Sabe Lo Que Va a Pasar Mañana, stating that it is "an ode to life in the barrio in Puerto Rico, with its parties and its music, its crime and excess".

== Promotion ==
=== Music video ===
A music video for "Acho PR" was released on Bad Bunny's thirtieth birthday, March 10, 2024; the singer, alongside Dwayne Johnson, presented an award at the 96th Academy Awards that day. The video features all four artists, as well as its producers, Tainy and Mag, during the recording of the song in a studio in New York City. Around the end of the video, it features some of Bad Bunny's highlights of 2023 and ends the clips by announcing two new dates in Puerto Rico for his Most Wanted Tour.

=== Audio visualizer ===
An audio visualizer was uploaded to YouTube on October 13, 2023 along with the other video visualizers for the songs that premiered simultaneously with the release of Nadie Sabe Lo Que Va a Pasar Mañana.

== Charts ==
Chart performance for "Acho PR"
Chart (2023)	Peak position
Colombia (Billboard)	11
Ecuador (Billboard)	16
Global 200 (Billboard)	47
Peru (Billboard)	25
Spain (PROMUSICAE)	22
US Billboard Hot 100	83
US Hot Latin Songs (Billboard)	24

== Certifications ==
Certifications and sales for "Acho PR"
Region	Certification	Certified units/sales
Spain (Promusicae)	Gold	50,000^{‡}
^{‡} Sales+streaming figures based on certification alone.
