= Una Velita =

2024 single by Bad Bunny

Single by Bad Bunny
- Language: Spanish
- English title: "A Little Candle"
- Released: September 19, 2024
- Genre: Folk; bomba; conscious hip hop; jíbaro
- Length: 3:59
- Label: Rimas
- Songwriter: Benito Martínez
- Producers: La Paciencia; Tainy

Bad Bunny singles chronology
"Adivino" (2024)	"Una Velita" (2024)	"Qué Pasaría..." (2024)

Visualizer
- "Una Velita" on YouTube

"Una Velita" (transl. "A Little Candle") is a song by Puerto Rican rapper Bad Bunny. It was released as a single on September 19, 2024, through Rimas Entertainment. It was written solely by the singer, while it was produced by La Paciencia and Tainy.

== Composition ==
Produced by fellow producers La Paciencia and Tainy, "Una Velita" is a folk and plena song. Lyrically, he raps about lighting a candle during Hurricane Maria (2017), and how the infrastructure of Puerto Rico has not improved since the disaster.

== Release ==
"Una Velita" was released for digital download and streaming on September 19, 2024, through Rimas Entertainment. An accompanying visualizer was released onto YouTube on the same day.

== Charts ==
Chart performance for "Una Velita"
Chart (2024)	Peak position
Global 200 (Billboard)	81
Spain (PROMUSICAE)	15
US Billboard Hot 100	79
US Hot Latin Songs (Billboard)	4
