= Baticano =

Single by Bad Bunny

from the album Nadie Sabe Lo Que Va a Pasar Mañana
- Language: Spanish
- Released: October 31, 2023
- Genre: Latin trap; Alternative hip hop
- Length: 4:16
- Label: Rimas
- Songwriters: Benito Martínez; Marco Borrero
- Producers: Tainy; MAG; La Paciencia

Bad Bunny singles chronology
"Monaco" (2023)	"Baticano" (2023)	"Perro Negro" (2023)

Music video
- "Baticano" on YouTube

"Baticano" is a song by Puerto Rican rapper Bad Bunny, released on October 13, 2023, through Rimas Entertainment, as a track on his fifth solo studio album Nadie Sabe Lo Que Va a Pasar Mañana (2023), with a music video released on October 31, 2023. The music video stars American actor Steve Buscemi and pays tribute to the German film Nosferatu. The song peaked at number 78 on the Billboard Hot 100.

== Background and reception ==
On October 9, 2023, Bad Bunny announced his fifth studio album, Nadie Sabe Lo Que Va a Pasar Mañana, as well as its track list, where "Baticano" was included as the fifteenth track. Billboard ranked "Baticano" at number 18 on their list of songs from its parent album, stating that it "reinforces the message that no one is exempt from their own shortcomings".

== Music video ==
Its music video was released on October 31, 2023, on Halloween. Directed by fellow video director Stillz and mainly a black-and-white video, it pays tribute to German expressionist cinema, namely the 1920 film The Cabinet of Dr. Caligari and the 1922 film Nosferatu. The singer is playing both the role of the somnabulist Cesare and of Count Orlok (Nosferatu). American actor Steve Buscemi appears as his mentor.

In the beginning of the video, Buscemi is seen reviving Nosferatu and setting him free, where he creeps over a sleeping woman. It later taking place in a graveyard, where corpses perform choreography. In parts of the video, a man is seen abusing his wife with a portrait of Jesus seen on the wall and a father covering his son's eyes as two men kissing appear on the television, angrily turning it off. Towards the near end of the video, Bad Bunny is seen praying and Buscemi also warns him that "the Earth is cruel out there" and that "[the Earth isn't] ready for [him]".

== Charts ==
Chart performance for "Baticano"
Chart (2023)	Peak position
Global 200 (Billboard)	59
Spain (PROMUSICAE)	34
US Billboard Hot 100	78
US Hot Latin Songs (Billboard)	22
