= Perro Negro =

Single by Bad Bunny and Feid

from the album Nadie Sabe Lo Que Va a Pasar Mañana
- Language: Spanish
- English title: "Black Dog"
- Released: November 17, 2023
- Genre: Reggaeton
- Length: 2:42
- Label: Rimas
- Songwriters: Benito Martínez; Salomón Villada
- Producers: MAG; La Paciencia; Smash David; Argel; Jon Mili; Frankie; Digital Jet

Bad Bunny singles chronology
"Baticano" (2023)	"Perro Negro" (2023)	"No Me Quiero Casar" (2023)

Visualizer
- "Perro Negro" on YouTube

"Perro Negro" (English: Black Dog) is a song by Puerto Rican rapper Bad Bunny and Colombian singer Feid. It was released as a single on November 17, 2023, through Rimas Entertainment.

== Background and release ==
First it was rumored that a collaboration between the two singers might possibly come out, and that it would be successful. On October 9, 2023, Bad Bunny made an official announcement about "Nadie Sabe Lo Que Va a Pasar Mañana", and that "Perro Negro" would be included as the nineteenth track.

== Critical reception ==
Billboard ranked "Perro Negro" as the fourth best song on Nadie Sabe Lo Que Va a Pasar Mañana, stating that "their voices soar atop [the] scintillating new reggaetón track, complete with pulsating beats that transport listeners mentally to the heart of Medellín's nightlife".

== Audio visualizer ==
An audio visualizer was uploaded to YouTube on October 13, 2023 along with the other song audio visualizers that appeared on Nadie Sabe Lo Que Va a Pasar Mañana.

== Charts ==
=== Weekly charts ===
Weekly chart performance for "Perro Negro"
Chart (2023)	Peak position
Argentina Hot 100 (Billboard)	29
Bolivia (Billboard)	2
Canada Hot 100 (Billboard)	89
Chile (Billboard)	3
Colombia (Billboard)	1
Colombia (Monitor Latino)	3
Ecuador (Billboard)	1
Ecuador (Monitor Latino)	3
Global 200 (Billboard)	4
Mexico (Billboard)	4
Peru (Billboard)	1
Peru (Monitor Latino)	6
Portugal (AFP)	93
Spain (PROMUSICAE)	2
Switzerland (Schweizer Hitparade)	66
US Billboard Hot 100	20
US Hot Latin Songs (Billboard)	2
US Latin Airplay (Billboard)	1
US Latin Rhythm Airplay (Billboard)	1

Chart (2026)	Peak position
Colombia Hot 100 (Billboard)	94

=== Year-end charts ===
2024 year-end chart performance for "Perro Negro"
Chart (2024)	Position
Global 200 (Billboard)	52
US Hot Latin Songs (Billboard)	2
US Latin Airplay (Billboard)	2
US Latin Rhythm Airplay (Billboard)	1

== Certifications ==
Certifications and sales for "Perro Negro"
Region	Certification	Certified units/sales
Italy (FIMI)	Gold	50,000^{‡}
Spain (PROMUSICAE)	5× Platinum	300,000^{‡}
^{‡} Sales+streaming figures based on certification alone.

== See also ==
- List of Billboard Global 200 top 10 singles of 2023
- List of Billboard Hot Latin Songs and Latin Airplay number ones of 2024
- List of best-selling singles in Spain
