= K-pop (Travis Scott, Bad Bunny and the Weeknd song) =

2023 single by Travis Scott, Bad Bunny and the Weeknd

Single by Travis Scott, Bad Bunny and the Weeknd

from the album Utopia
- Released: July 21, 2023
- Recorded: 2023
- Studio: Shangri-La (California)
- Genre: Trap; reggaeton; baile funk
- Length: 3:05
- Label: Cactus Jack; Epic
- Songwriters: Jacques Webster II; Benito Martínez; Abel Tesfaye; Carlo Montagnese; Benjamin Saint-Fort; Matthew Samuels; Jahaan Sweet; Bigram Zayas
- Producers: Illangelo; Bnyx; Boi-1da; Sweet

Travis Scott singles chronology
"Ring Ring" (2023)	"K-pop" (2023)	"Delresto (Echoes)" (2023)

Bad Bunny singles chronology
"Where She Goes" (2023)	"K-pop" (2023)	"Un Preview" (2023)

The Weeknd singles chronology
"Popular" (2023)	"K-pop" (2023)	"Another One of Me" (2023)

Alternative cover

Music video
- "K-pop" on YouTube

"K-pop" (stylized as "K-POP") is a song by American rapper Travis Scott, Puerto Rican rapper Bad Bunny, and Canadian singer the Weeknd. It was released through Cactus Jack and Epic Records as the lead single from the former's fourth studio album, Utopia, on July 21, 2023. It was written alongside producers Illangelo, Bnyx, Boi-1da, and Jahaan Sweet, and co-producer DVLP.

== Background ==
Scott announced the collaboration on his social media accounts on July 19, 2023. Both Bad Bunny and The Weeknd had previously been among artists named to appear on Utopia, with Scott previewing an unreleased collaboration with Bad Bunny at a club in Monaco in May 2023. Bad Bunny said in an interview with Rolling Stone in its July/August 2023 issue that he and Scott "worked on that a while back".

== Composition ==
"K-pop" is a "bouncy" trap song, with elements of Afrobeats and baile funk. Billboard's Mackenzie Cummings-Grady argued that it is "the lightest song on Utopia", and felt that it was a "joyful" intermission that "gives Bad Bunny and the Weeknd the space to highlight their talents". It is performed in the key of F Dorian in common time with a tempo of 122 beats per minute.

== Critical reception ==
"K-pop" received mixed reviews from music critics. Mike DeStefano, Ben Felderstein, and Stefan Breskin of Complex deemed it as the weakest song from Utopia. Pitchfork's Alphonse Pierre felt the song was "a diabolically stupid plan to create the most popular song in the world," criticizing its "sauceless" rhythm and title that "supposedly isn't a reference to the Korean pop genre to game extra clicks." Writing for HipHopDX, Vivian Medithi described "K-pop" as a "perfectly adequate" duet between Scott and Bad Bunny that was "appended with an interminable verse from the Weeknd, just to make sure the streaming numbers look as good as the inexplicably Japanese single cover."

Mackenzie Cummings-Grady of Billboard placed "K-pop" at number 11 in her ranking of the songs from Utopia.

== Commercial performance ==
In the United States "K-pop" debuted at number seven on the Billboard Hot 100, becoming Scott's 12th top-ten single and his first as a lead artist since 2020 single's "Franchise". It also became Bad Bunny's second song in the top 10 in 2023 and the 11th in his career, as well as The Weeknd's third top 10 in 2023 and 17th overall. The song also reached number two on the Hot R&B/Hip-Hop Songs, becoming Scott's 21st, Bad Bunny's second and The Weeknd's 24th song to appear on the top-ten of the chart.

The song also peaked at number five on the Billboard Global 200, with 53.2 million streams and 14,000 copies sold worldwide in its first week.

Outside of United States, the song met a well success, reaching the top ten in Portugal, Greece, Switzerland and Luxembourg, top twenty in Canada, France, Iceland, Italy, Lebanon, Poland and Slovakia, top thirty in Australia, Austria, Belgium, Germany, New Zealand, Spain, Sweden and United Kingdom and top forty in San Marino, Hungary and Czech Republic.

== Music video ==
An accompanying music video for "K-pop", directed by Scott, was released on July 21, 2023. The video features Scott "getting his groove on" in an empty football stadium (OGC Nice's Allianz Riviera) that has been covered with Utopia branding. He teases a potential stadium tour in support of Utopia with signage that reads "Stadium Tour Rehearsal", while sharing a look at his upcoming sneaker collaboration with Air Jordan. Bad Bunny is seen making his way through a nightclub, and the Weeknd is spotted enjoying a meal with Scott in a "unique" mansion surrounded by women. The visual features cameo appearances from Matthew Williams, Pharrell Williams, and SZA.

== Charts ==
=== Weekly charts ===
Weekly chart performance for "K-pop"
Chart (2023–2024)	Peak position
Australia (ARIA)	22
Australia Hip Hop/R&B (ARIA)	8
Austria (Ö3 Austria Top 40)	27
Belgium (Billboard)	24
Canada Hot 100 (Billboard)	14
Czech Republic Singles Digital (ČNS IFPI)	36
Denmark (Tracklisten)	25
Dominican Republic (SodinPro)	37
Finland (Suomen virallinen lista)	47
France (SNEP)	20
Germany (GfK)	22
Global 200 (Billboard)	5
Greece International (IFPI)	3
Hungary (Single Top 40)	31
Iceland (Tónlistinn)	17
Ireland (IRMA)	30
Italy (FIMI)	20
Lebanon (Lebanese Top 20)	15
Lithuania (AGATA)	34
Luxembourg (Billboard)	2
MENA (IFPI)	18
Netherlands (Single Top 100)	49
Netherlands (Tipparade)	23
New Zealand (Recorded Music NZ)	27
Norway (VG-lista)	22
Panama (PRODUCE)	31
Poland (Polish Streaming Top 100)	17
Portugal (AFP)	7
San Marino (SMRRTV Top 50)	37
Slovakia Singles Digital (ČNS IFPI)	13
Spain (Promusicae)	24
Sweden (Sverigetopplistan)	26
Switzerland (Schweizer Hitparade)	3
UK Singles (Official Charts)	24
US Billboard Hot 100	7
US Hot R&B/Hip-Hop Songs (Billboard)	2
US Pop Airplay (Billboard)	26
US Rhythmic Airplay (Billboard)	12

=== Year-end charts ===
Year-end chart performance for "K-pop"
Chart (2023)	Position
US Hot R&B/Hip-Hop Songs (Billboard)	58

== Certifications ==
Certifications for "K-pop"
Region	Certification	Certified units/sales
Brazil (Pro-Música Brasil)	Platinum	40,000^{‡}
Canada (Music Canada)	Platinum	80,000^{‡}
Italy (FIMI)	Gold	50,000^{‡}
Mexico (AMPROFON)	Platinum	140,000^{‡}
Poland (ZPAV)	Gold	25,000^{‡}
Spain (Promusicae)	Gold	30,000^{‡}
Switzerland (IFPI Switzerland)	Gold	15,000^{‡}
United States (RIAA)	Platinum	1,000,000^{‡}
^{‡} Sales+streaming figures based on certification alone.

== Release history ==
Release history for "K-pop"
Region	Date	Format	Version(s)	Label	Ref.
Various	July 21, 2023	CD; digital download; streaming; vinyl	Original	Cactus Jack; Epic	
Various	July 25, 2023	Digital download; streaming	4-track "chopped and screwed" EP	Cactus Jack; Epic	
United States	July 25, 2023	Contemporary hit radio	Original	Cactus Jack; Epic	
United States	July 25, 2023	Rhythmic contemporary radio	Original	Cactus Jack; Epic	
