= Hibiki (Bad Bunny and Mora song) =

Song by Bad Bunny and Mora

from the album Nadie Sabe Lo Que Va a Pasar Mañana
- Language: Spanish
- Released: October 13, 2023
- Genre: Deep house; Latin trap
- Length: 3:28
- Label: Rimas
- Songwriters: Benito Martínez; Gabriel Mora
- Producers: Tainy; Hassi; La Paciencia; Machael; Tob; Twobitmario; MAG

Visualizer
- "Hibiki" on YouTube

"Hibiki" is a song by Puerto Rican rapper Bad Bunny and Puerto Rican singer Mora. It was released on October 13, 2023, through Rimas Entertainment.

== Background and release ==
Bad Bunny and Mora had previously collaborated, including on "Una Vez" from Bad Bunny's second album, YHLQMDLG, and on "Volando" (remix). On October 9, 2023, Bad Bunny announced his fifth studio album, Nadie Sabe Lo Que Va a Pasar Mañana, scheduled to be released on October 13, and "Hibiki" was included as the fourth track.

== Composition ==
"Hibiki" is an alternative reggaeton and trap song with elements of deep house and electropop. According to the lyrics, the word "Hibiki" means "harmony", but it is also the brand name of a Japanese whiskey that is produced in Osaka. In the song, Bad Bunny says "Bebiendo whisky, fumando agares" (Drinking whiskey, smoking agars).

== Critical reception ==
Billboard ranked "Hibiki" at number 21 of 22 on their list of songs from Nadie Sabe Lo Que Va a Pasar Mañana, stating that it "brings [Bad Bunny] back to his trap foundations while incorporating futuristic sounds of an alternate 2023 reality".

== Audio visualizer ==
An audio visualizer for the song was uploaded to YouTube on October 13, 2023 along with the other audio visualizers for the other songs released simultaneously with the release of Nadie Sabe Lo Que Va a Pasar Mañana.

== Charts ==
Chart performance for "Hibiki"
Chart (2023)	Peak position
Argentina Hot 100 (Billboard)	60
Bolivia (Billboard)	6
Chile (Billboard)	11
Colombia (Billboard)	6
Ecuador (Billboard)	4
Global 200 (Billboard)	11
Mexico (Billboard)	10
Peru (Billboard)	6
Portugal (AFP)	79
Spain (PROMUSICAE)	4
US Billboard Hot 100	24
US Hot Latin Songs (Billboard)	5

== Certifications ==
Certifications and sales for "Hibiki"
Region	Certification	Certified units/sales
Spain (Promusicae)	Platinum	60,000^{‡}
^{‡} Sales+streaming figures based on certification alone.
