= Adivino =

Single by Myke Towers and Bad Bunny

from the album La Pantera Negra
- Language: Spanish
- Released: April 25, 2024
- Genre: Alternative reggaeton; EDM; latin pop
- Length: 4:38
- Label: One World; Warner Latina
- Songwriters: Michael Torres; Benito Martínez; Misael de la Cruz; Amritvir Singh; Marco Masis; Andrés Corredor; Antonio Balderas; Julio Batista; Michael Masís; Orlando Cepeda
- Producers: De la Cruz; Eiby; Finesse; Max Borghetti; Jarom Su'a; Tainy

Myke Towers singles chronology
| "La Falda" (club remixes) (2024) | "Adivino" (2024) | "Maquillaje" (remix) (2024) |

Bad Bunny singles chronology
| "Acho PR" (2024) | "Adivino" (2024) | "Una Velita" (2024) |

Visualizer
- "Adivino" on YouTube

"Adivino" is a song by Puerto Rican rappers Myke Towers and Bad Bunny, released on April 25, 2024, through Warner Music Latina as the lead single from the former's fourth studio album, La Pantera Negra (2024). It is the third collaboration between both artists, following "Puesto Pa' Guerrial" and "Estamos Arriba".

== Music and lyrics ==
"Adivino" is a reggaeton song, with elements of electronic music. Bad Bunny mentions his ex-girlfriend Kendall Jenner in his verse, including the lyric "Tú fuiste uno de mis amore', yo solamente fui otro 'e tu' ex" ("You were one of my loves, I was just another ex").

== Commercial performance ==
It peaked at number 63 on the US Billboard Hot 100 and number two on US Hot Latin Songs and Latin Streaming Songs charts, with 9.9 million official streams in the United States. It also topped the Latin Digital Song Sales chart. Rolling Stone ranked the song 99 on its "The 100 Best Songs of 2024" list.

== Charts ==
=== Weekly charts ===
Weekly chart performance for "Adivino"
| Chart (2024) | Peak position |
|---|---|
| Argentina Hot 100 (Billboard) | 48 |
| Bolivia (Billboard) | 6 |
| Central America + Caribbean (FONOTICA) | 1 |
| Chile (Billboard) | 8 |
| Colombia (Billboard) | 4 |
| Ecuador (Billboard) | 4 |
| Global 200 (Billboard) | 28 |
| Mexico (Billboard) | 14 |
| Peru (Billboard) | 7 |
| Portugal (AFP) | 96 |
| Spain (PROMUSICAE) | 3 |
| Switzerland (Schweizer Hitparade) | 73 |
| US Billboard Hot 100 | 63 |
| US Hot Latin Songs (Billboard) | 2 |

=== Year-end charts ===
Year-end chart performance for "Adivino"
| Chart (2024) | Position |
|---|---|
| US Hot Latin Songs (Billboard) | 23 |

== Certifications ==
Certifications for "Adivino"
| Region | Certification | Certified units/sales |
|---|---|---|
| Mexico (AMPROFON) | Platinum+Gold | 210,000^{‡} |
| Portugal (AFP) | Gold | 12,000^{‡} |
| Spain (Promusicae) | 3× Platinum | 300,000^{‡} |
| United States (RIAA) | 14× Platinum (Latin) | 840,000^{‡} |
^{‡} Sales+streaming figures based on certification alone.
