= Fina (song) =

Song by Bad Bunny and Young Miko

from the album Nadie Sabe Lo Que Va a Pasar Mañana
- Language: Spanish
- English title: "Fine"
- Released: October 13, 2023
- Genre: Latin trap
- Length: 3:36
- Label: Rimas
- Songwriters: Benito Martínez; María Ramírez; Teguí Calderón; Samuel Jiménez; Roberto Rosado; Miguel Montoya; Hector Pagan; Nicolás Baran; Michael Hernández; Marco Borrero; Amaury López; Mariana López; Stephane Reibaldi
- Producers: MAG; La Paciencia; Smash David; Argel; LPF; Patron; Nico Baran; Foreign Teck; DJ Joe; Mauro

Visualizer
- "Fina" on YouTube

"Fina" (English: Fine) is a song by Puerto Rican rappers Bad Bunny and Young Miko. It was released on October 13, 2023, through Rimas Entertainment, as part of Bad Bunny's fifth studio album, Nadie Sabe Lo Que Va a Pasar Mañana.

== Background and release ==
On October 9, 2023, Bad Bunny announced his album Nadie Sabe Lo Que Va a Pasar Mañana, and "Fina" was included as the album's third track.

== Critical reception ==
Billboard ranked "Fina" as the sixth best song on Nadie Sabe Lo Que Va a Pasar Mañana, placing it because of "the precision of the collaboration", adding that it "is powered by a head-bobbing beat".

== Audio visualizer ==
The audio visualizer was uploaded to YouTube on Bad Bunny's channel on October 13, 2023, along with the other audio visualizer videos that premiered simultaneously with the release of Nadie Sabe Lo Que Va a Pasar Mañana.

== Charts ==
Chart performance for "Fina"
Chart (2023)	Peak position
Argentina Hot 100 (Billboard)	42
Bolivia (Billboard)	4
Canada Hot 100 (Billboard)	90
Chile (Billboard)	7
Colombia (Billboard)	3
Ecuador (Billboard)	3
Global 200 (Billboard)	6
Mexico (Billboard)	6
Peru (Billboard)	3
Portugal (AFP)	63
Spain (PROMUSICAE)	5
Switzerland (Schweizer Hitparade)	40
US Billboard Hot 100	14
US Hot Latin Songs (Billboard)	2

== Certifications ==
Certifications and sales for "Fina"
Region	Certification	Certified units/sales
Spain (Promusicae)	Platinum	100,000^{‡}
^{‡} Sales+streaming figures based on certification alone.
