= Monaco (song) =

2023 single by Bad Bunny

Single by Bad Bunny

from the album Nadie Sabe Lo Que Va a Pasar Mañana
- Language: Spanish
- Released: October 13, 2023
- Genre: Latin trap
- Length: 4:27
- Label: Rimas
- Songwriters: Benito Martínez; Charles Aznavour; Georges Garvarentz
- Producers: MAG; Smash David; Edsclusive; Argel; La Paciencia

Bad Bunny singles chronology
"Un Preview" (2023)	"Monaco" (2023)	"Baticano" (2023)

Music video
- "Monaco" on YouTube

"Monaco" is a song by Puerto Rican rapper Bad Bunny. It was released on October 12, 2023 as a track on his fifth solo studio album Nadie Sabe Lo Que Va a Pasar Mañana and a music video was released on the same day. It contains a sample of the song "Hier encore", by Charles Aznavour.

== Background and release ==
The song was written by Bad Bunny. On October 9, 2023, he announced his album Nadie Sabe Lo Que Va a Pasar Mañana, and "Monaco" was included as the second track. Because the sample of "Hier encore", Charles Aznavour and Georges Garvarentz are also credited as songwriters.

== Critical reception ==
Billboard ranked "Monaco" as the second best song on Nadie Sabe Lo Que Va a Pasar Mañana, calling it "nothing short of an avant-garde fusion".

== Audio visualizer ==
The audio visualizer was uploaded to YouTube on October 13, 2023 along with other audio visualizers that were uploaded simultaneously with the release of Nadie Sabe Lo Que Va a Pasar Mañana.

== Music video ==
The music video was released on October 13, 2023, hours after the album's release. The video clip starred Al Pacino, Keith William Richards and Wayne Diamond. The music video featured Bad Bunny attending the 2023 Monaco Grand Prix. He is seen with Sergio Perez and his RB19 in the video.

== Live performances ==
In October 2023, Bad Bunny performed the song on Saturday Night Live during an episode in which he held the double role of host and musical guest. The performance was introduced by actor Pedro Pascal.

In February 2026, Bad Bunny performed the song as part of his Super Bowl halftime show.

== Charts ==
=== Weekly charts ===
2023 weekly chart performance for "Monaco"
Chart (2023)	Peak position
Argentina Hot 100 (Billboard)	18
Bolivia (Billboard)	3
Canada Hot 100 (Billboard)	28
Chile (Billboard)	4
Colombia (Billboard)	2
Ecuador (Billboard)	2
France (SNEP)	47
Global 200 (Billboard)	1
Italy (FIMI)	44
Luxembourg (Billboard)	16
Mexico (Billboard)	1
Netherlands (Single Tip)	2
New Zealand Hot Singles (RMNZ)	12
Peru (Billboard)	2
Portugal (AFP)	5
Spain (PROMUSICAE)	1
Switzerland (Schweizer Hitparade)	10
US Billboard Hot 100	5
US Hot Latin Songs (Billboard)	1
US Latin Airplay (Billboard)	1
US Rhythmic Airplay (Billboard)	24

2026 weekly chart performance for "Monaco"
Chart (2026)	Peak position
Colombia Hot 100 (Billboard)	48
France (SNEP)	140
Greece International (IFPI)	11
UK Singles Sales (OCC)	88
US Hot Latin Rhythm Songs (Billboard)	7

=== Year-end charts ===
2024 year-end chart performance for "Monaco"
Chart (2024)	Position
Global 200 (Billboard)	119
US Billboard Hot 100	82
US Hot Latin Songs (Billboard)	4
US Latin Airplay (Billboard)	15
US Latin Rhythm Airplay (Billboard)	5

== Certifications ==
Certifications and sales for "Monaco"
Region	Certification	Certified units/sales
France (SNEP)	Platinum	200,000^{‡}
Italy (FIMI)	Gold	50,000^{‡}
Portugal (AFP)	2× Platinum	50,000^{‡}
Spain (Promusicae)	2× Platinum	120,000^{‡}
Streaming
Greece (IFPI Greece)	Gold	1,000,000^{†}
^{‡} Sales+streaming figures based on certification alone.^{†} Streaming-only figures based on certification alone.

== See also ==
- List of Billboard Hot Latin Songs and Latin Airplay number ones of 2023
- List of Billboard Hot Latin Songs and Latin Airplay number ones of 2024
