= Un x100to =

2023 single by Grupo Frontera and Bad Bunny

Single by Grupo Frontera and Bad Bunny

from the album El Comienzo
- Language: Spanish
- Released: April 17, 2023
- Genre: Cumbia; norteño
- Length: 3:14
- Label: Rimas
- Songwriters: Andrés Jael Correa Rios; Benito Martínez; Edgar Barrera; Marcos Borrero
- Producers: Edgar Barrera; MAG

Grupo Frontera singles chronology
"Frágil" (2023)	"Un x100to" (2023)	"Quédate Conmigo" (2023)

Bad Bunny singles chronology
"Ojitos Lindos" (2023)	"Un x100to" (2023)	"Where She Goes" (2023)

Music video
- "Un x100to" on YouTube

"Un x100to" (an abbreviation of "Un Porciento" in Spanish, meaning "One Percent" in English (Note: In Spanish, x (indicating multiplication) is pronounced 'por' and 100 is pronounced 'cien', sounding like "Un Porciento".)) is a song by the American band Grupo Frontera and Puerto Rican rapper Bad Bunny. It was released on April 17, 2023, through Rimas.

== Background ==
After Bad Bunny called himself a "big fan" of regional Mexican music, the song marks only the second time the artist tapped into the genre, following the remix of "Soy el Diablo" by Natanael Cano. In an interview with Zane Lowe, he expressed his love for the band and explained how important it is for the world to be exposed to other Latin music genres besides "reggaeton and perreo and urban music". The artist posted a TikTok of him dancing to the song on April 16, 2023, his first appearance on the app in four months.

The group noted that they had no idea Benito would be featured in the song until the day of the video shoot.

== Composition ==
Produced by Latin "hitmaker" Edgar Barrera and Puerto Rican-Dominican producer Mag Borrero, the song features a fusion of "captivating percussion" and Grupo Frontera's signature "accordion melody". The collaboration sees Barrer putting his "romantic cumbia-norteño spin" on the Grupo Frontera sound. The chorus is sung by Payo Solís of the band and Bad Bunny. It tells the story of a person missing their former partner, calling them with just one percent of battery left on the phone and sending messages that keep them awake.

The song features a similar chord progression to the 1995 Tejano classic "Desvelado" by fellow Edinburg, Texas regional Mexican artist Bobby Pulido. Shortly after the song's release, Pulido interpolated the chorus from "Un x100to" into his own performance of "Desvelado" at a festival in Monterrey, Nuevo León.

Ingrid Fajardo of Billboard referred to the song as a "new heartbreak anthem".

== Accolades ==
Awards and nominations for "Un x100to"
Year	Award	Category	Result	Ref.
2023	MTV Video Music Awards	Best Latin	Nominated	
2023	Billboard Latin Music Awards	Hot Latin Song of the Year	Nominated	
2023	Billboard Latin Music Awards	Hot Latin Song of the Year, Vocal Event	Nominated	
2023	Billboard Latin Music Awards	Streaming Song of the Year	Nominated	
2023	Billboard Latin Music Awards	Regional Mexican Song of the Year	Nominated	
2023	Latin Grammy Awards	Song of the Year	Nominated	
2023	Latin Grammy Awards	Best Regional Mexican Song	Won	

== Music video ==
An accompanying music video was released on April 17, 2023, directed by Abelardo Baez and filmed in a Nevada ghost town. The visuals are set on a ranch. Bad Bunny stands out among the group with a light-blue outfit, while Grupo Frontera wears Cowboy-style clothing.

== Charts ==
=== Weekly charts ===
Weekly chart performance for "Un x100to"
Chart (2023)	Peak position
Argentina Hot 100 (Billboard)	6
Bolivia (Billboard)	1
Canada Hot 100 (Billboard)	70
Chile (Billboard)	1
Colombia (Billboard)	1
Costa Rica (Monitor Latino)	1
Dominican Republic (Monitor Latino)	3
Ecuador (Billboard)	1
El Salvador (Monitor Latino)	1
Global 200 (Billboard)	1
Guatemala (Monitor Latino)	1
Honduras (Monitor Latino)	1
Mexico (Billboard)	2
Nicaragua (Monitor Latino)	6
Panama (Monitor Latino)	4
Paraguay (Monitor Latino)	1
Peru (Billboard)	1
Portugal (AFP)	91
Spain (Promusicae)	10
Switzerland (Schweizer Hitparade)	77
Uruguay (Monitor Latino)	14
US Billboard Hot 100	5
US Hot Latin Songs (Billboard)	2
US Latin Airplay (Billboard)	1
US Regional Mexican Airplay (Billboard)	3

=== Year-end charts ===
Year-end chart performance for "Un x100to"
Chart (2023)	Position
Global 200 (Billboard)	25
US Billboard Hot 100	49
US Hot Latin Songs (Billboard)	3

== Certifications ==
Certifications for "Un x100to"
Region	Certification	Certified units/sales
Mexico (AMPROFON)	Diamond+3× Platinum+Gold	1,190,000^{‡}
Spain (Promusicae)	2× Platinum	120,000^{‡}
^{‡} Sales+streaming figures based on certification alone.

== See also ==
- List of Billboard Hot Latin Songs and Latin Airplay number ones of 2023
