= Where She Goes =

"WHERE SHE GOES"

Single by Bad Bunny

from the album Nadie Sabe Lo Que Va a Pasar Mañana
- Language: Spanish
- Released: May 18, 2023
- Recorded: 2023
- Genre: Jersey club
- Length: 3:51
- Label: Rimas
- Songwriters: Benito Martínez; Marco Borrero; Roberto Rosado
- Producer: Mag

Bad Bunny singles chronology
| "Un x100to" (2023) | "WHERE SHE GOES" (2023) | "K-pop" (2023) |

Music video
- "Where She Goes" on YouTube

"WHERE SHE GOES" is a song by Puerto Rican rapper Bad Bunny. It was released on May 18, 2023, through Rimas Entertainment, as the lead single from his fifth studio album Nadie Sabe Lo Que Va a Pasar Mañana (2023). He wrote the song himself alongside producers Mag and La Paciencia, although only the former produced the song.

== Background and release ==
A month after the release of "Un x100to" with American band Grupo Frontera, on May 17, 2023, Bad Bunny announced the release of his new single "Where She Goes". The song was released the next day. As the song title suggests, some of the lyrics are in English, but most are in Spanish.

== Music and composition ==
"Where She Goes" is primarily a Jersey club track that contains prominent elements of electronic, EDM, house, reggaeton, drill, urbano, hip-hop, and dembow. A dramatic melody then begins, backed by Bad Bunny's signature deep vocals. Bad Bunny first teased the single earlier this month on TikTok, joking, "Tell me if you like it and I'll send it to you via WhatsApp." While the song does feature an English title, Bad Bunny sings in his native Spanish, although he does use some English lines throughout the track, as fans have become used to. He rhymes about a girl he met once and ponders if he will ever see her again.

The vocal sample "Hey" is sampled from the 1995 sample CD "Best Service - Voice Spectral Vol 1".

== Accolades ==
Awards and nominations for "Where She Goes"
| Organization | Year | Category | Result | Ref. |
|---|---|---|---|---|
| MTV Video Music Awards | 2023 | Best Latin | Nominated | |
| Rolling Stone en Español Awards | 2023 | Music Video of the Year | Nominated | |

== Music video ==
The music video was released on May 18, 2023. In it, Bad Bunny is depicted on a mountain top at the beginning. Later on he uses a car to drive through a large desert, while in another part of the video they appear near a campfire dancing and singing. The video also includes cameo appearances by Lil Uzi Vert, Dominic Fike, Ronaldinho and Frank Ocean.

== Charts ==
=== Weekly charts ===
Weekly chart performance for "Where She Goes"
| Chart (2023) | Peak position |
|---|---|
| Argentina Hot 100 (Billboard) | 16 |
| Bolivia (Billboard) | 4 |
| Canada Hot 100 (Billboard) | 32 |
| Chile (Billboard) | 1 |
| Colombia (Billboard) | 6 |
| Ecuador (Billboard) | 2 |
| France (SNEP) | 103 |
| Global 200 (Billboard) | 1 |
| Ireland (IRMA) | 65 |
| Italy (FIMI) | 17 |
| Luxembourg (Billboard) | 10 |
| Mexico (Billboard) | 6 |
| Netherlands (Single Tip) | 11 |
| New Zealand Hot Singles (RMNZ) | 20 |
| Peru (Billboard) | 3 |
| Portugal (AFP) | 14 |
| Spain (PROMUSICAE) | 1 |
| Suriname (Nationale Top 40) | 12 |
| Switzerland (Schweizer Hitparade) | 5 |
| UK Indie (Official Charts) | 41 |
| US Billboard Hot 100 | 8 |
| US Hot Latin Songs (Billboard) | 2 |
| US Latin Airplay (Billboard) | 1 |
| US Rhythmic Airplay (Billboard) | 29 |

=== Year-end charts ===
Year-end chart performance for "Where She Goes"
| Chart (2023) | Position |
|---|---|
| Global 200 (Billboard) | 74 |
| Italy (FIMI) | 51 |
| Switzerland (Schweizer Hitparade) | 80 |
| US Billboard Hot 100 | 72 |
| US Hot Latin Songs (Billboard) | 6 |

== Certifications ==
Certifications and sales for "Where She Goes"
| Region | Certification | Certified units/sales |
|---|---|---|
| France (SNEP) | Gold | 100,000^{‡} |
| Italy (FIMI) | 2× Platinum | 200,000^{‡} |
| Portugal (AFP) | 2× Platinum | 50,000^{‡} |
| Spain (Promusicae) | 5× Platinum | 500,000^{‡} |
^{‡} Sales+streaming figures based on certification alone.
