= Rimas Entertainment =

Puerto Rican record label

- Founded: March 2014; 12 years ago
- Founder: Rafael Ricardo Jiménez Dan; Noah Assad
- Distributor: The Orchard
- Genre: Various; primarily Latin trap and reggaeton
- Country of origin: Puerto Rico
- Location: San Juan
- Official website: rimasmusic.com

Rimas Entertainment, commonly known as Rimas, is a Puerto Rican independent record label based in San Juan, Puerto Rico, with offices in Miami, Florida, Caracas, Venezuela and Medellín, Colombia. It mainly focuses on reggaeton and Latin trap. It represents artists such as Bad Bunny, Karol G (through Habibi Management), RaiNao, Mora, Arcángel, Omar Courtz, Tempo, Eladio Carrión, Pailita, Cris MJ, Amenazzy, Corina Smith, Neutro Shorty, Gigolo & La Exce, Jowell & Randy, Big Soto, Vico C (through Nain Music), Nino Neil, Quevedo and Sech among several others. Music is distributed through The Orchard.

== History ==
Rimas Entertainment was founded in 2014 by Rafael Ricardo Jimenez-Dan. In 2023, he sold 60% of his stake to Noah Assad. In 2021, Rimas signed a distribution deal with The Orchard to create a new record label called Sonar. In 2025, Rimas acquired a stake in Dale Play Records.

== List of artists on Sony Music Latin ==
This is a list of artist currently signed to Rimas Entertainment.

- Arcángel
- Bad Bunny
- Omar Courtz
- Ñengo Flow
- Sech
- Eladio Carrión
- Jowell & Randy
- Mora
- Dei V
- Juan Luis Guerra
- Latin Mafia
- Lunay
- Rawayana
- Miky Woodz
- Katteyes
- Fronti
- RaiNao
- Andy Rivera
- Tito Nieves
- El Jordan 23
- Rafa Pabön
- Big Soto
- Cultura Profética
- Neutro Shorty
- Sen Senra
- Midnvght
- Chris Lebron
- Tommy Torres
- Mvrk
- Marconi Impara
- Joyce Santana
- Raul Clyde
- Chanell
- Kiko el Crazy
- Tommy Blanco
- Ednita Nazario
- Austin San
- Bon Calso
- Vreno YG"
- Christian Alicea
- Vei Habache
- Machaka
- Diego 900
- Pink Pablo
- Breko
- Aaantonio

== Awards and nominations ==
Award	Year	Nominated	Category	Result	Ref.
Billboard Latin Music Awards	2019	Rimas Entertainment	Latin Rhythm Albums Label of the Year	Nominated	
Billboard Latin Music Awards	2020	Rimas Entertainment	Hot Latin Songs Label of the Year	Nominated	
Billboard Latin Music Awards	2020	Rimas Entertainment	Hot Latin Songs Imprint of the Year	Nominated	
Billboard Latin Music Awards	2020	Rimas Entertainment	Top Latin Albums Label of the Year	Nominated	
Billboard Latin Music Awards	2020	Rimas Entertainment	Top Latin Albums Imprint of the Year	Nominated	
Billboard Latin Music Awards	2020	Rimas Entertainment	Tropical Songs Airplay Label of the Year	Nominated	
Billboard Latin Music Awards	2020	Rimas Entertainment	Latin Rhythm Airplay Label of the Year	Nominated	
Billboard Latin Music Awards	2020	Rimas Entertainment	Latin Rhythm Albums Label of the Year	Nominated	
Billboard Latin Music Awards	2020	Rimas Entertainment	Latin Rhythm Albums Imprint of the Year	Nominated	
Billboard Latin Music Awards	2021	Rimas Entertainment	Hot Latin Songs Label of the Year	Won	
Billboard Latin Music Awards	2021	Rimas Entertainment	Hot Latin Songs Imprint of the Year	Won	
Billboard Latin Music Awards	2021	Rimas Entertainment	Airplay Label of the Year	Nominated	
Billboard Latin Music Awards	2021	Rimas Entertainment	Airplay Imprint of the Year	Nominated	
Billboard Latin Music Awards	2021	Rimas Entertainment	Top Latin Albums Label of the Year	Won	
Billboard Latin Music Awards	2021	Rimas Entertainment	Top Latin Albums Imprint of the Year	Won	
Billboard Latin Music Awards	2021	Rimas Entertainment	Latin Pop Airplay Label of the Year	Nominated	
Billboard Latin Music Awards	2021	Rimas Entertainment	Latin Pop Airplay Imprint of the Year	Nominated	
Billboard Latin Music Awards	2021	Rimas Entertainment	Latin Rhythm Airplay Label of the Year	Nominated	
Billboard Latin Music Awards	2021	Rimas Entertainment	Latin Rhythm Airplay Imprint of the Year	Nominated	
Billboard Latin Music Awards	2021	Rimas Entertainment	Latin Rhythm Albums Label of the Year	Won	
Billboard Latin Music Awards	2021	Rimas Entertainment	Latin Rhythm Albums Imprint of the Year	Won	
Billboard Latin Music Awards	2022	Rimas Entertainment	Hot Latin Songs Label of the Year	Won	
Billboard Latin Music Awards	2022	Rimas Entertainment	Hot Latin Songs Imprint of the Year	Won	
Billboard Latin Music Awards	2022	Rimas Entertainment	Airplay Label of the Year	Nominated	
Billboard Latin Music Awards	2022	Rimas Entertainment	Airplay Imprint of the Year	Nominated	
Billboard Latin Music Awards	2022	Rimas Entertainment	Top Latin Albums Label of the Year	Won	
Billboard Latin Music Awards	2022	Rimas Entertainment	Top Latin Albums Imprint of the Year	Won	
Billboard Latin Music Awards	2022	Rimas Entertainment	Latin Pop Airplay Label of the Year	Nominated	
Billboard Latin Music Awards	2022	Rimas Entertainment	Tropical Songs Airplay Label of the Year	Nominated	
Billboard Latin Music Awards	2022	Rimas Entertainment	Tropical Songs Airplay Imprint of the Year	Nominated	
Billboard Latin Music Awards	2022	Rimas Entertainment	Latin Rhythm Airplay Label of the Year	Nominated	
Billboard Latin Music Awards	2022	Rimas Entertainment	Latin Rhythm Airplay Imprint of the Year	Nominated	
Billboard Latin Music Awards	2022	Rimas Entertainment	Latin Rhythm Albums Label of the Year	Won	
Billboard Latin Music Awards	2022	Rimas Entertainment	Latin Rhythm Albums Imprint of the Year	Won	
Billboard Latin Music Awards	2023	Rimas Entertainment	Hot Latin Songs Label of the Year	Nominated	
Billboard Latin Music Awards	2023	Rimas Entertainment	Airplay Label of the Year	Nominated	
Billboard Latin Music Awards	2023	Rimas Entertainment	Top Latin Albums Label of the Year	Won	
Billboard Latin Music Awards	2023	Rimas Entertainment	Tropical Songs Airplay Label of the Year	Nominated	
Billboard Latin Music Awards	2023	Rimas Entertainment	Latin Rhythm Airplay Label of the Year	Nominated	
Billboard Latin Music Awards	2023	Rimas Entertainment	Latin Rhythm Albums Label of the Year	Won	
Billboard Latin Music Awards	2024	Rimas Entertainment	Hot Latin Songs Label of the Year	Nominated	
Billboard Latin Music Awards	2024	Rimas Entertainment	Airplay Label of the Year	Nominated	
Billboard Latin Music Awards	2024	Rimas Entertainment	Top Latin Albums Label of the Year	Nominated	
Billboard Latin Music Awards	2024	Rimas Entertainment	Tropical Songs Airplay Label of the Year	Nominated	
Billboard Latin Music Awards	2024	Rimas Entertainment	Latin Rhythm Airplay Label of the Year	Nominated	
Billboard Latin Music Awards	2024	Rimas Entertainment	Latin Rhythm Albums Label of the Year	Won	
Billboard Latin Music Awards	2025	Rimas Entertainment	Hot Latin Songs Label of the Year	Pending	
Billboard Latin Music Awards	2025	Rimas Entertainment	Airplay Label of the Year	Pending	
Billboard Latin Music Awards	2025	Rimas Entertainment	Top Latin Albums Label of the Year	Pending	
Billboard Latin Music Awards	2025	Rimas Entertainment	Tropical Songs Airplay Label of the Year	Pending	
Billboard Latin Music Awards	2025	Rimas Entertainment	Latin Rhythm Airplay Label of the Year	Pending	
Billboard Latin Music Awards	2025	Rimas Entertainment	Latin Rhythm Albums Label of the Year	Pending	
Billboard Latin Music Awards	2025	Rimas Entertainment	Publishing Corporation of the Year	Pending	

== See also ==
- Lists of record labels
