= Mag (music producer) =

American record producer and songwriter

- Born: Marco Daniel Borrero; New York City, U.S.
- Genres: Latin trap; reggaeton
- Occupations: Record producer; songwriter
- Publisher: Warner Chappell Music

Marco Daniel Borrero, known professionally as Mag, is an American record producer and songwriter from Brooklyn. He is recognized for his work with Bad Bunny, particularly on the album Un Verano Sin Ti, and has collaborated with artists such as Rauw Alejandro, Bebe Rexha, Imagine Dragons, Demi Lovato, and Selena Gomez. According to Warner Chappell Music, he is also a protégé of producer Max Martin.

== Career ==
Born in Brooklyn, Borrero, produced 15 of the 23 tracks on Bad Bunny's album Un Verano Sin Ti, including the commercially successful songs "Tití Me Preguntó" and "Me Porto Bonito", which together have surpassed 1.9 billion streams on Spotify as of 2023. The album, released in May 2022 via Rimas Entertainment, was noted for its impact on Latin music's global visibility, with long-time collaborator Tainy highlighting its role in breaking down barriers in the Anglo-dominated market.

In 2020, Borrero served as the executive producer of Bad Bunny's album El Último Tour Del Mundo, contributing to multiple tracks including "Te Mudaste", "Yo Visto Así", "Haciendo Que Me Amas", "Te Deseo Lo Mejor", "Booker T", "Maldita Pobreza", and "La Droga", as well as "Trellas" and "Antes Que Se Acabe". His work on the album led to his debut at No. 1 on Billboard's Hot 100 Producers chart (dated December 12, 2020). He also topped the Latin Producers chart and ranked No. 2 on the Latin Songwriters chart during the same week. Borrero described the project as a turning point, noting that it was the first time an artist had entrusted him with full creative direction as executive producer.

== Awards and nominations ==
=== Grammy Awards ===
Year	Nominee / work	Award	Result	Ref.
2022	El Último Tour Del Mundo	Best Música Urbana Album	Won	
2023	Un Verano Sin Ti	Best Música Urbana Album	Won	
2023	Un Verano Sin Ti	Album of the Year	Nominated	
2026	Debí Tirar Más Fotos	Album of the Year	Won	
2026	"DTMF"	Record of the Year	Nominated	
2026	"DTMF"	Song of the Year	Nominated	

=== Latin Grammy Awards ===
Year	Nominee / work	Award	Result	Ref.
2021	"Booker T"	Best Rap/Hip Hop Song	Won	
2021	El Último Tour Del Mundo	Best Urban Music Album	Won	
2021	El Último Tour Del Mundo	Album of the Year	Nominated	
2022	Un Verano Sin Ti	Album of the Year	Nominated	
2022	Un Verano Sin Ti	Best Urban Music Album	Won	
2022	"Tití Me Preguntó"	Best Urban Song	Won	
2023	"Un x100to"	Best Regional Mexican Song	Won	
2023	"Un x100to"	Song of the Year	Nominated	
2024	"Mi Ex Tenía Razón"	Song of the Year	Nominated	
2024	"Mi Ex Tenía Razón"	Record of the Year	Nominated	
2024	"Mónaco"	Record of the Year	Nominated	
2025	"Baile Inolvidable"	Record of the Year	Nominated	
2025	"Baile Inolvidable"	Song of the Year	Nominated	
2025	"DTMF"	Song of the Year	Nominated	
2025	"DTMF"	Record of the Year	Nominated	
2025	"DTMF"	Best Urban Song	Won	
2025	"Lo Que Le Pasó a Hawaii"	Best Roots Song	Nominated	
2025	Debí Tirar Más Fotos	Album of the Year	Won	
