= WrestleMania 37 =

2021 WWE pay-per-view and livestreaming event

- Promotional poster featuring Bianca Belair, Bobby Lashley, Roman Reigns, Drew McIntyre, Sasha Banks, and Bad Bunny
- Promotion: WWE
- Brand(s): Raw; SmackDown
- Date: April 10–11, 2021 (Note: This event was originally set to be held as a one-night event on March 28, 2021, before changing into a two-night event.)
- City: Tampa, Florida
- Venue: Raymond James Stadium (Note: This event was originally set to be held at SoFi Stadium in Inglewood, California.)
- Attendance: Night 1: 17,946 (Note: The capacity for each night was capped at 25,000 spectators due to the COVID-19 pandemic. Attendees were separated by pods with physical distancing in place.); Night 2: 18,501; Combined: 40,806

WWE event chronology
| ← Previous; NXT TakeOver: Stand & Deliver | Next → WrestleMania Backlash |

WrestleMania chronology
| ← Previous; 36 | Next → 38 |

WrestleMania 37 was a 2021 two-part professional wrestling pay-per-view (PPV) and livestreaming event produced by WWE, held for wrestlers from the promotion's main roster brands, Raw and SmackDown. It was the 37th annual WrestleMania and was WWE's first event to have ticked fans in attendance during the COVID-19 pandemic, although to a limited capacity. Like the prior year's WrestleMania 36, it took place as a two-night event, held on Saturday, April 10, and Sunday, April 11, 2021, at Raymond James Stadium in Tampa, Florida, subsequently making the two-night format for WrestleMania a permanent change. WWE Hall of Famers Hulk Hogan and Titus O'Neil served as the hosts of the event, ultimately being Hogan's final WrestleMania appearance before his death in 2025.

The event was originally scheduled to take place on March 28, 2021, at SoFi Stadium in Inglewood, California; however, due to ongoing COVID-19 restrictions in California, WWE rescheduled and moved the event to Raymond James Stadium in Tampa, the originally planned venue for WrestleMania 36 before the pandemic forced that event to be relocated and held behind closed doors at the WWE Performance Center in Orlando, Florida—in August 2020, Florida loosened its COVID-19 restrictions and SoFi Stadium would later get WrestleMania 39 in 2023. This marked WWE's first event to have ticketed fans in attendance since NXT on March 11, 2020, just before pandemic-related restrictions took effect. With the limited capacity, WWE claimed to have sold out of all available tickets and had an attendance of 25,675 spectators for each night, totaling 51,350 combined; however, this was disputed, with the actual number of tickets sold and the actual attendance number being around 20% lower than WWE's claimed numbers for both nights.

The card comprised 14 matches that were evenly divided between the two nights and unlike previous years, there were no matches contested on either night's Kickoff pre-show. In the main event for Night 1, Bianca Belair defeated Sasha Banks to win the SmackDown Women's Championship. This was the first time two African Americans headlined WrestleMania, as well as the second time women headlined the event after WrestleMania 35 in 2019. Other prominent matches saw singer Bad Bunny and Damian Priest defeat The Miz and John Morrison, and in the opening bout, which was a main match for Raw, Bobby Lashley defeated Drew McIntyre by technical submission to retain the WWE Championship. In the main event for Night 2, which was SmackDown's main match, Roman Reigns defeated Daniel Bryan and Edge in a triple threat match to retain the Universal Championship. Also on the card, Rhea Ripley defeated Asuka to win the Raw Women's Championship. Additionally, Natalya and Tamina became the first women to compete in two separate matches at a single WrestleMania, having a match on both nights.

Following the merger of the American version of the WWE Network under Peacock, which had a transitional period beginning in mid-March, WrestleMania 37 was WWE's first PPV and livestreaming event for the main roster to broadcast on Peacock after the shutdown of the American WWE Network on April 4. It was also the first WrestleMania to livestream on SonyLIV in India after a similar merger in February. After this event, WWE returned Raw and SmackDown's programming to its bio-secure bubble called the WWE ThunderDome, which was relocated to Tampa's Yuengling Center beginning with the April 12 broadcast of Monday Night Raw, before the company resumed live touring with full capacity crowds in mid-July.

WrestleMania 37 was generally well-received for marking the return of a live crowd, with the main events of both nights, as well as Seth Rollins vs. Cesaro, Sheamus vs. Matt Riddle, and a surprise celebrity performance by Bad Bunny receiving the highest praise, while Shane McMahon vs. Braun Strowman, Randy Orton vs. The Fiend, and most of the tag team matches were criticized.

== Production ==
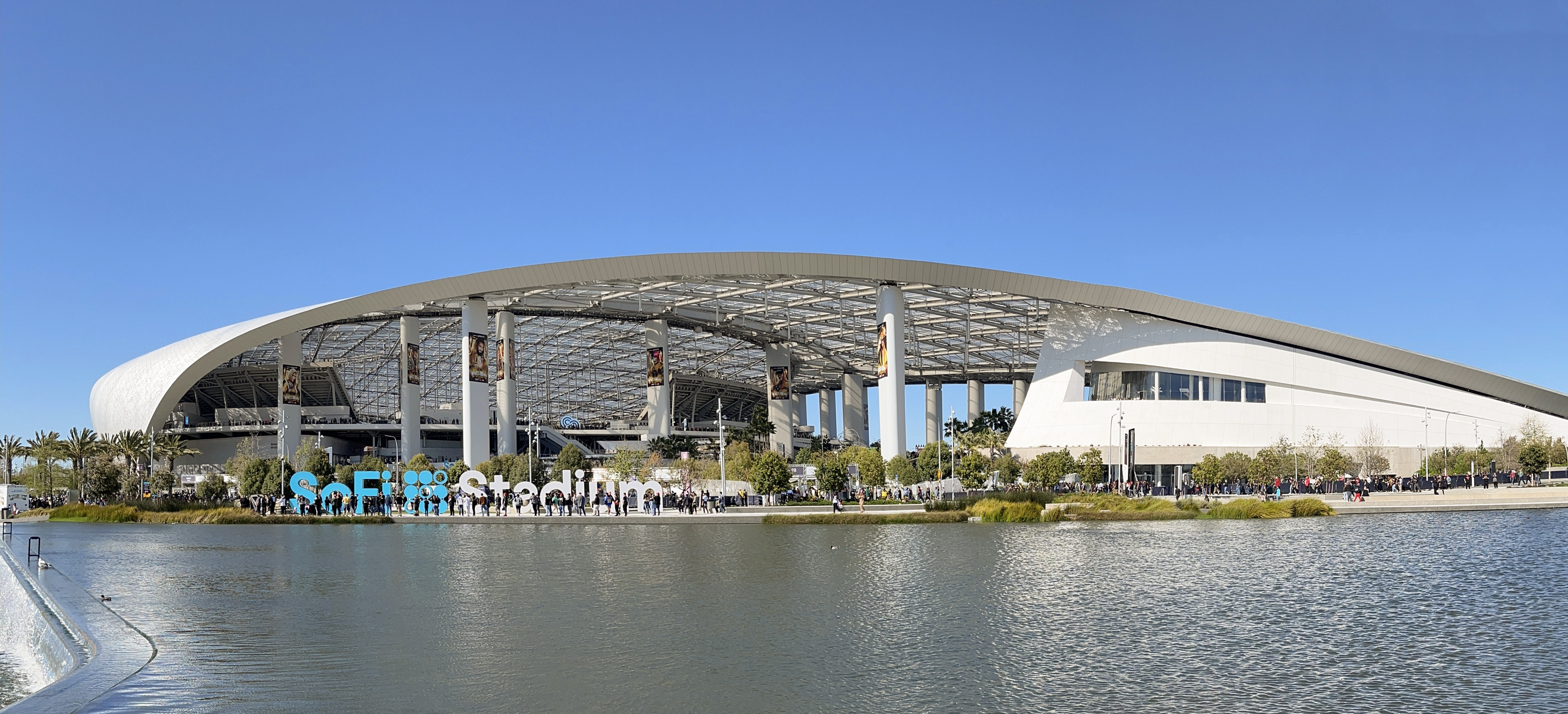
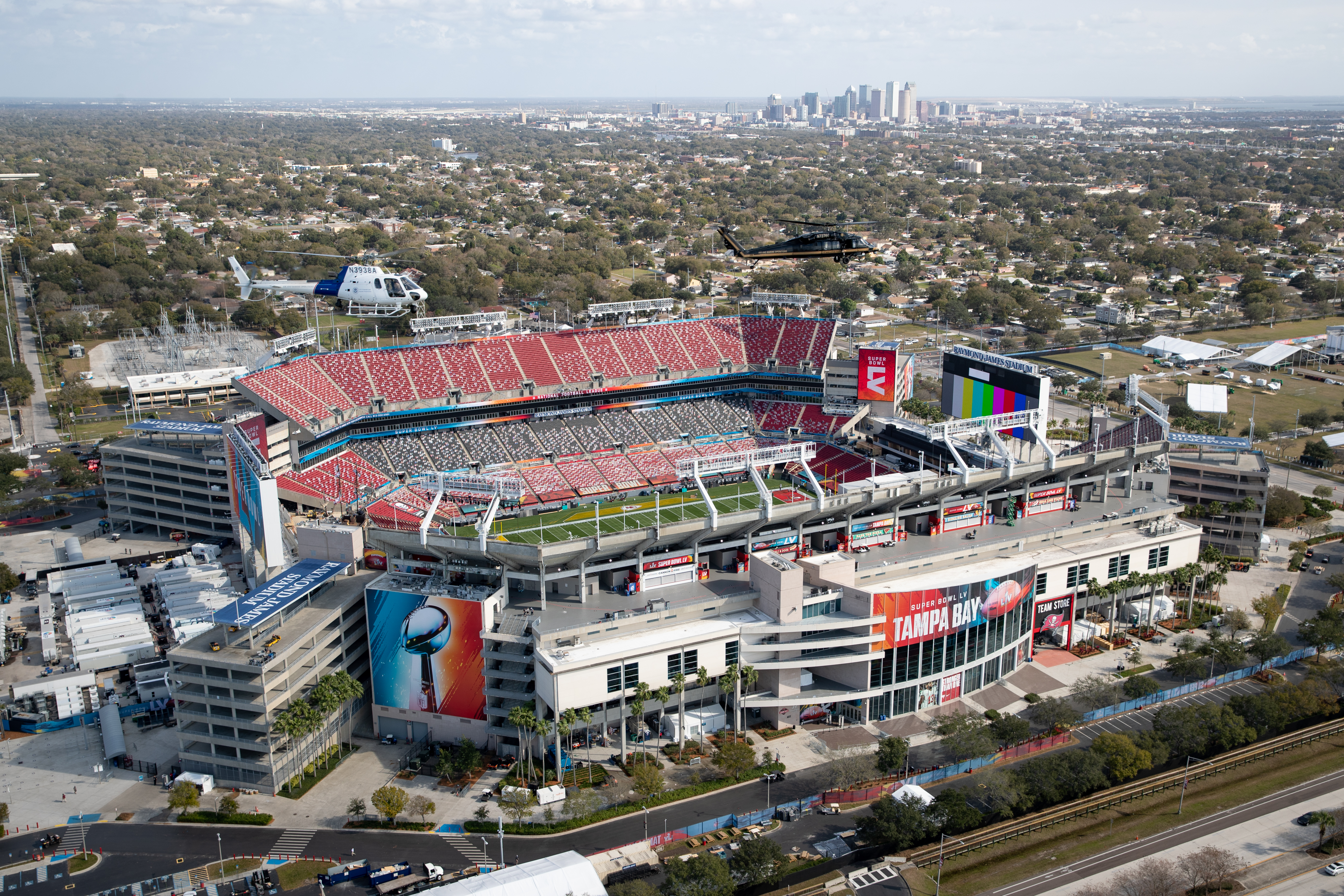
The 37th annual WrestleMania was originally scheduled to be held at SoFi Stadium in Inglewood, California, but due to California's ongoing COVID-19 restrictions, the event was moved to Raymond James Stadium in Tampa, Florida, the originally planned venue for WrestleMania 36 before the pandemic forced it to be relocated to the WWE Performance Center in Orlando—in August 2020, Florida loosened its restrictions. SoFi Stadium would later get WrestleMania 39 in 2023.

=== Background ===
WrestleMania is WWE's flagship professional wrestling pay-per-view (PPV) and livestreaming event, having first been held in 1985. It was the company's first pay-per-view produced and was also WWE's first major event available via livestreaming when the company launched the WWE Network in 2014. It is the longest-running professional wrestling event in history and is held annually between mid-March to mid-April. It was the first of WWE's original four pay-per-views, which includes Royal Rumble, SummerSlam, and Survivor Series, referred to as the "Big Four". WrestleMania was ranked the sixth most valuable sports brand in the world by Forbes in 2019, and has been described as the Super Bowl of sports entertainment. Much like the Super Bowl, cities bid for the right to host the year's edition of WrestleMania. WrestleMania 37 featured wrestlers from the Raw and SmackDown brand divisions—unlike WrestleMania 36, it did not feature the NXT brand. "Save Your Tears" by The Weeknd, "Head Up High" by Fitz, and "All The Gold" by def rebel were the official theme songs for the event. WWE Hall of Famers Hulk Hogan and Titus O'Neil served as the hosts of WrestleMania 37.

WrestleMania 37 was originally scheduled to be held in Inglewood, California at SoFi Stadium on March 28, 2021, marketed as WrestleMania Hollywood. It would have been the first since WrestleMania 21 to be held in Greater Los Angeles, and the seventh held in the U.S. state of California (after 2, VII, XII, 2000, 21, and 31). However, on January 16, WWE officially confirmed that WrestleMania 37 would instead be held at Raymond James Stadium in Tampa, Florida—the originally planned venue for WrestleMania 36—as a two-night event on Saturday, April 10, and Sunday, April 11, 2021. It was in turn the fifth WrestleMania to be held in the U.S. state of Florida (after XXIV, XXVIII, 33, and 36). WrestleMania 37 adopted much of the pirate-themed marketing originally used for WrestleMania 36, including having a similar logo. It was also the first WWE event to have ticketed fans in attendance during the COVID-19 pandemic. Tickets were originally to go on sale on March 16, but were delayed. Pre-sale tickets were then available on March 18 before tickets went on sale the following day. Individual tickets for each night, as well as two-night bundle packages, were made available, with a maximum capacity of 25,000 spectators for each night.

==== Impact of the COVID-19 pandemic ====
As a result of the COVID-19 pandemic, WWE suspended its touring arena shows in mid-March 2020, and moved its weekly broadcasts for the Raw and SmackDown brands, as well as their PPV and livestreaming events, to the WWE Performance Center training facility in Orlando, Florida, with no outside spectators and only essential staff present. This included WrestleMania 36, which was the first major professional wrestling event to be affected by the pandemic. NXT continued to broadcast from its home venue at the time, Full Sail University in Winter Park, Florida, but with similar limitations. In late August, WWE moved its programming for Raw and SmackDown to Orlando's Amway Center in a bio-secure bubble called the WWE ThunderDome to display a virtual audience on LED displays around the ring, but still without outside spectators. In October, NXT moved to the Performance Center in a similar setup called the Capitol Wrestling Center, but included a small live audience, while in December, the ThunderDome relocated to Tropicana Field in St. Petersburg, Florida.

In October 2020, it was reported by the Wrestling Observer Newsletter that WWE was relocating WrestleMania 37 to Raymond James Stadium in Tampa, Florida, as the state of the pandemic in California made it unlikely that the event could be held with in-person spectators on the originally scheduled date. By contrast, Florida officially removed capacity limits for sporting events in late August, but local sports organizations continued to voluntarily limit their capacity in accordance with CDC guidance. Rival promotion All Elite Wrestling (AEW) held tapings with spectators at Jacksonville's Daily's Place since late August 2020 at 15% of the venue's capacity. The Tampa Bay Buccaneers of the National Football League (NFL) began admitting fans to their games at Raymond James Stadium in October, with a maximum capacity of 25%, while Super Bowl LV was hosted by the stadium on February 7, 2021, with an official attendance of 24,835 spectators.

On January 16, 2021, WWE announced that WrestleMania 37 would take place at Raymond James Stadium in Tampa, and like WrestleMania 36, it would be a two-night event, held on April 10 and 11, 2021, thus making the two-night format for WrestleMania a permanent change. WWE also confirmed that SoFi Stadium would instead host WrestleMania 39 in 2023, as 2022's WrestleMania 38 was scheduled for AT&T Stadium in Arlington, Texas. Mayor of Tampa Jane Castor stated that the event would be "in true WWE fashion, the perfect comeback story and marks a clear indication that our beautiful city is poised to bounce back stronger than ever". Mayor of Inglewood James T. Butts Jr. welcomed WWE's decision to allow Tampa to "have their rightful WrestleMania moment". In an interview with TMZ Sports on January 19, WWE's Chief Brand Officer Stephanie McMahon affirmed WWE's plan to have live fans in attendance at WrestleMania 37, stating that "hopefully, this will be the first opportunity for us to have our fans back in attendance". She also said that they would be watching how the NFL handled hosting the Super Bowl to learn logistically what does and does not work.

In February, the Wrestling Observer Newsletter reported that WWE were planning to cap attendance at 30,000 spectators for each night, but later reported that the promotion were hoping for 45,000, if it could be approved by the city of Tampa. On March 17, the Tampa Bay Times confirmed that the capacity for each night would be 25,000 spectators and that attendees would be separated by pods with physical distancing in place. They also confirmed that the stadium would administer temperature checks and wellness screenings, that masks would be required and they would have free masks available, and any transactions would be paperless.

The pandemic also resulted in the absence of John Cena, who although had focused heavily on his acting career since 2016, he had wrestled or appeared at every WrestleMania since WrestleMania XIX in 2003. Cena had been reported to wrestle or at least appear at WrestleMania 37, but due to his filming schedule for the HBO Max series Peacemaker, which was shooting in Canada, it made it logistically impossible for him to travel to Florida, as upon his return to Canada, he would have had to quarantine for two weeks, which would have shut down production on the series. Two other big names that were absent from the event were Brock Lesnar and Goldberg. Lesnar last appeared at WrestleMania 36 and his contract expired in August 2020, and while it was believed that WWE would try to negotiate a new deal for Lesnar, there were no plans for him to appear at WrestleMania 37 by February 2021. Goldberg, who still had one more match on his contract for the year, had been briefly discussed to wrestle at the event, but by February, he was ultimately left out of any plans.

=== Broadcast outlets ===
Both nights of WrestleMania 37 were available on traditional pay-per-view. They were also available to livestream on Peacock in the United States, SonyLIV in India, and the WWE Network everywhere else. This was the first WrestleMania to livestream on SonyLIV after the Indian version of the WWE Network merged under SonyLIV in February. Additionally, on January 25, 2021, WWE announced that the streaming service Peacock would become the exclusive distributor of the WWE Network in the United States as part of a new agreement with NBCUniversal, which at the time aired Monday Night Raw and NXT on the USA Network. On March 18, the WWE Network became a premium channel on Peacock, with premium subscribers to the service receiving access to the WWE Network at no additional cost. WrestleMania 37 was the first WrestleMania produced under this new agreement.

After a brief transitional period, the standalone version of the WWE Network in the U.S. shut down on April 4, with future events only available via Peacock and traditional PPV. At the time, these changes did not impact the WWE Network in most countries outside of the U.S., which maintained the standalone service distributed by WWE and its existing partners. Following the event, WWE stated that WrestleMania 37 was Peacock's most-viewed live event to date, although they did not specify exact numbers.

=== Celebrity involvement ===
Celebrities from the entertainment field took part in the event in various capacities. Pop singer Bebe Rexha performed "America the Beautiful" prior to the show on Night 1, while country singer Ashland Craft did the same for Night 2. Two celebrities were directly involved in matches at the event. Rapper Bad Bunny wrestled in a tag team match, teaming with Damian Priest against The Miz and John Morrison on Night 1, while YouTube personality, actor, and boxer Logan Paul was the guest cornerman for Sami Zayn's match against Kevin Owens on Night 2. Additionally, two musical artists performed the entrance themes for wrestlers' entrances live on Night 2. Singer Ash Costello from the rock band New Year's Day played Rhea Ripley's entrance theme, "Brutality", for Ripley's entrance for her Raw Women's Championship match against defending champion Asuka, while rapper Wale did the same for Big E and his entrance theme "Feel The Power" for his Intercontinental Championship defense against Apollo Crews.

=== Other WrestleMania Week events ===
As part of the WrestleMania festivities during the week of the event, WWE held a number of events throughout the week. WrestleMania 37 Week began with the April 5 episode of Raw. The 2021 WWE Hall of Fame ceremony then aired the following night on April 6. WWE's NXT brand held their major event, TakeOver: Stand & Deliver, on April 7 and 8, while a special episode of NXT UK called "Prelude" also aired midday on April 8. On April 9, the night before WrestleMania 37 Night 1, WWE aired a special "WrestleMania Edition" of SmackDown. The episode featured the André the Giant Memorial Battle Royal, which was won by Jey Uso and was previously held at WrestleMania itself (with the exception of WrestleMania 36, in which the match was canceled due to concerns over the pandemic). (Note: Order of elimination: Akira Tozawa, Tucker, Shelton Benjamin, Cedric Alexander, Erik, Drew Gulak, Humberto Carrillo, Slapjack, Elias, Jaxson Ryker, Mace, T-Bar, Kalisto, Lince Dorado, Gran Metalik, Murphy, Angel Garza, Mustafa Ali, Ricochet, King Corbin, and Shinsuke Nakamura.) The SmackDown Tag Team Championship was also defended on the episode in a fatal four-way match where Dolph Ziggler and Robert Roode retained. Early on April 11, Peacock and WWE Network premiered a new episode of "Stone Cold" Steve Austin's Broken Skull Sessions, which featured AEW's Chris Jericho for the first time on WWE programming in nearly three years. The week was capped off by the Raw after WrestleMania on Monday April 12, and then finally, NXT began airing in its new Tuesday night slot.

=== Storylines ===
The event consisted of 14 matches that were evenly divided between the two nights. The matches resulted from scripted storylines. Results were predetermined by WWE's writers on the Raw and SmackDown brands, while storylines were produced on WWE's weekly television shows, Monday Night Raw and Friday Night SmackDown.

==== Main event matches ====
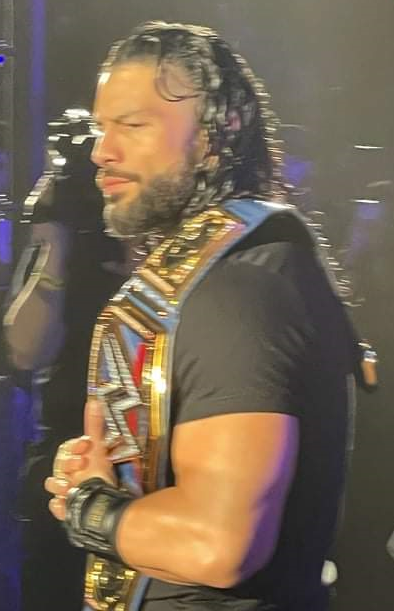
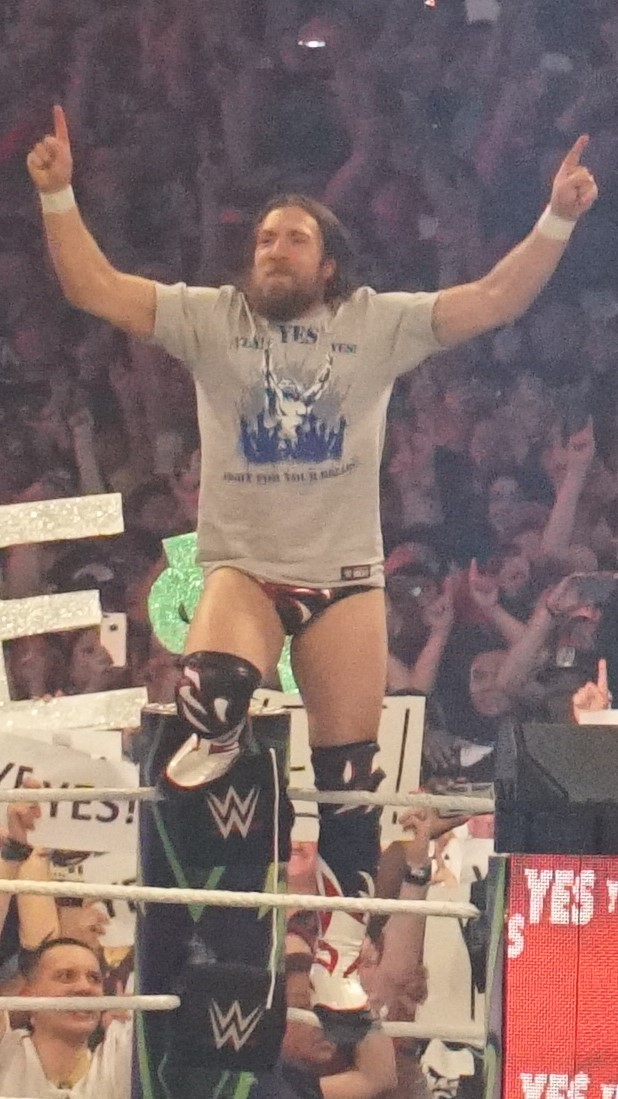
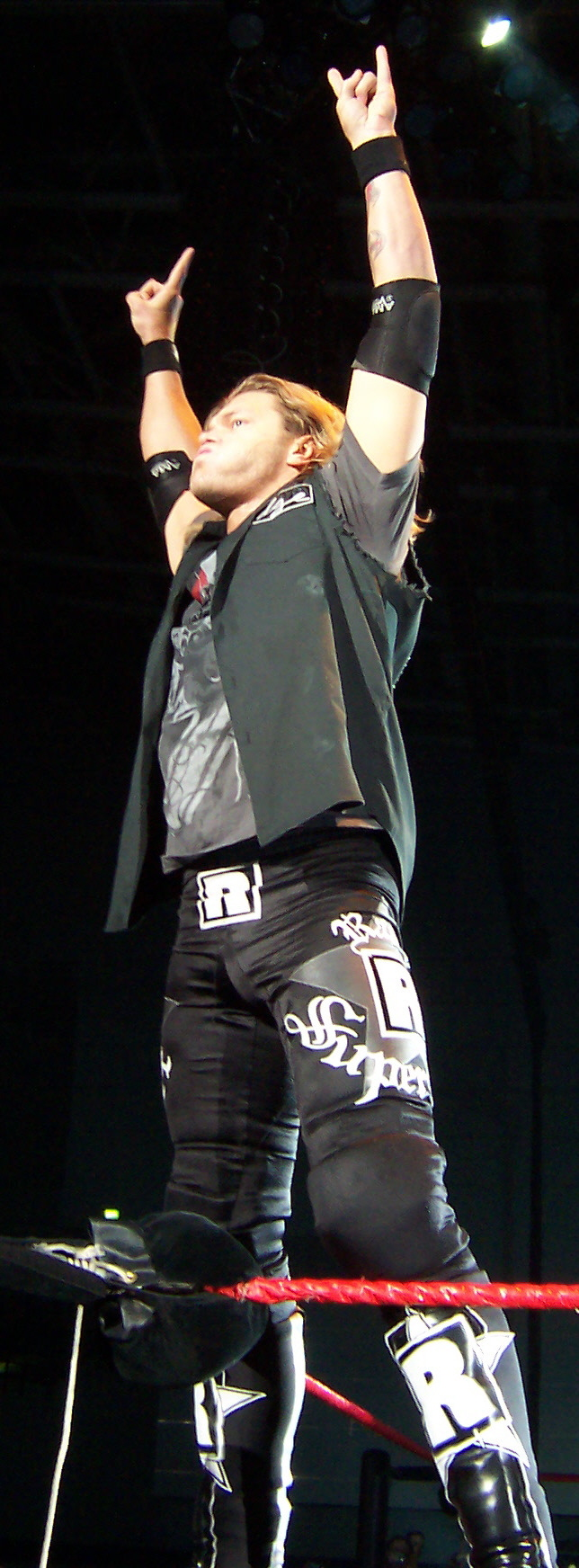
SmackDown's WWE Universal Champion Roman Reigns defended the title against both Daniel Bryan and 2021 Men's Royal Rumble winner Edge in the main event of Night 2.

Immediately following WrestleMania XXVII in April 2011, Edge, who at the time held the now-defunct World Heavyweight Championship, was forced to retire and relinquish his title due to a severe neck injury; Edge was then inducted into the WWE Hall of Fame in 2012. After nine years and two neck surgeries, Edge made his return as a surprise entrant at the 2020 Royal Rumble, making it to the final three. The following year, Edge declared his participation for the 2021 Royal Rumble, vowing to win the men's Royal Rumble match so he could go to WrestleMania 37 and become a world champion again, as he had never lost his world title. At the event on January 31, Edge entered the match at number one and went on to win as a Raw wrestler and earned himself a world championship match of his choice at WrestleMania 37. Over the next week, Edge appeared on Raw, NXT, and SmackDown, confronting each brand's world champion, but stated he would wait until after Elimination Chamber to make his decision. After SmackDown's Universal Champion Roman Reigns retained his title against Daniel Bryan at the event, Edge appeared and performed a Spear on Reigns. He then pointed to the WrestleMania sign, indicating that Edge had chosen to challenge Reigns for the Universal Championship, which was later confirmed. This came after Reigns demanded Edge to choose him, and after Reigns attacked Edge with a Spear on the February 19 episode of SmackDown. However, Bryan also pursued Reigns for another championship match, mocking Reigns for defending the title against him immediately after Bryan had won SmackDown's Elimination Chamber match. At Fastlane, Bryan faced Reigns for the championship once again, with Edge acting as the special guest enforcer; Reigns won the match after Edge attacked both men with a steel chair. On the March 26 episode of SmackDown, WWE official Adam Pearce scheduled Reigns to defend the Universal Championship against Bryan and Edge in a triple threat match at WrestleMania in the main event of Night 2.

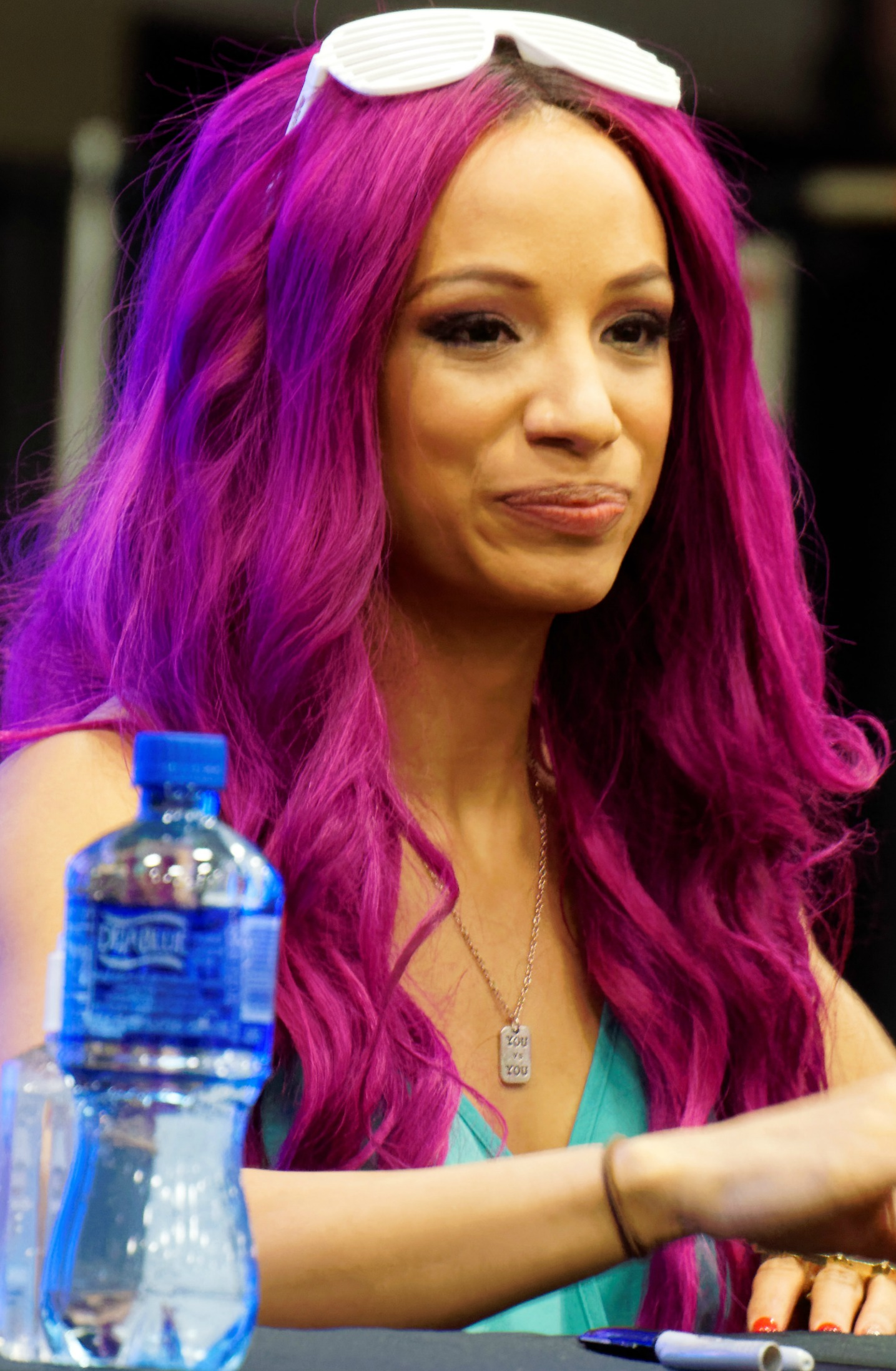
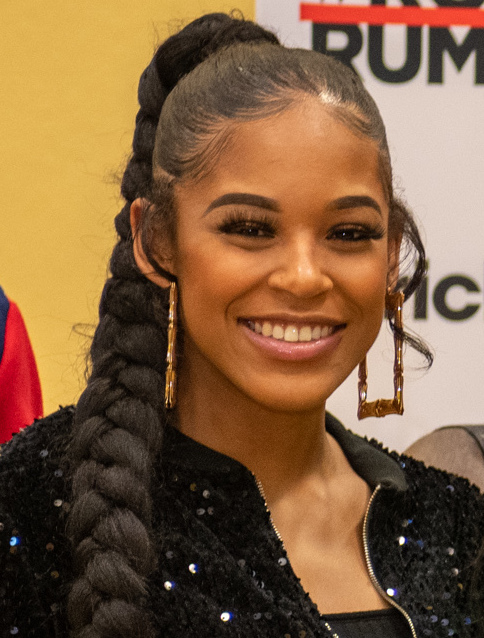
Sasha Banks defended the SmackDown Women's Championship against 2021 Women's Royal Rumble winner Bianca Belair in the main event of Night 1.

At the Royal Rumble, SmackDown's Bianca Belair won the women's Royal Rumble match to earn herself a women's world championship match of her choice at WrestleMania 37. Belair discussed facing the three brands' champions over the next few weeks, but had primarily gotten involved in segments with SmackDown Women's Champion Sasha Banks. Although Banks complimented Belair, she claimed that Belair was not the best as she did not have the SmackDown Women's Championship, playing off Belair's "EST" gimmick. On the February 26 episode of SmackDown, Belair decided that she would challenge Banks for the SmackDown Women's Championship at WrestleMania 37. The match was scheduled for the main event of Night 1, marking the second women's match to main event a WrestleMania after WrestleMania 35.

==== Undercard matches ====
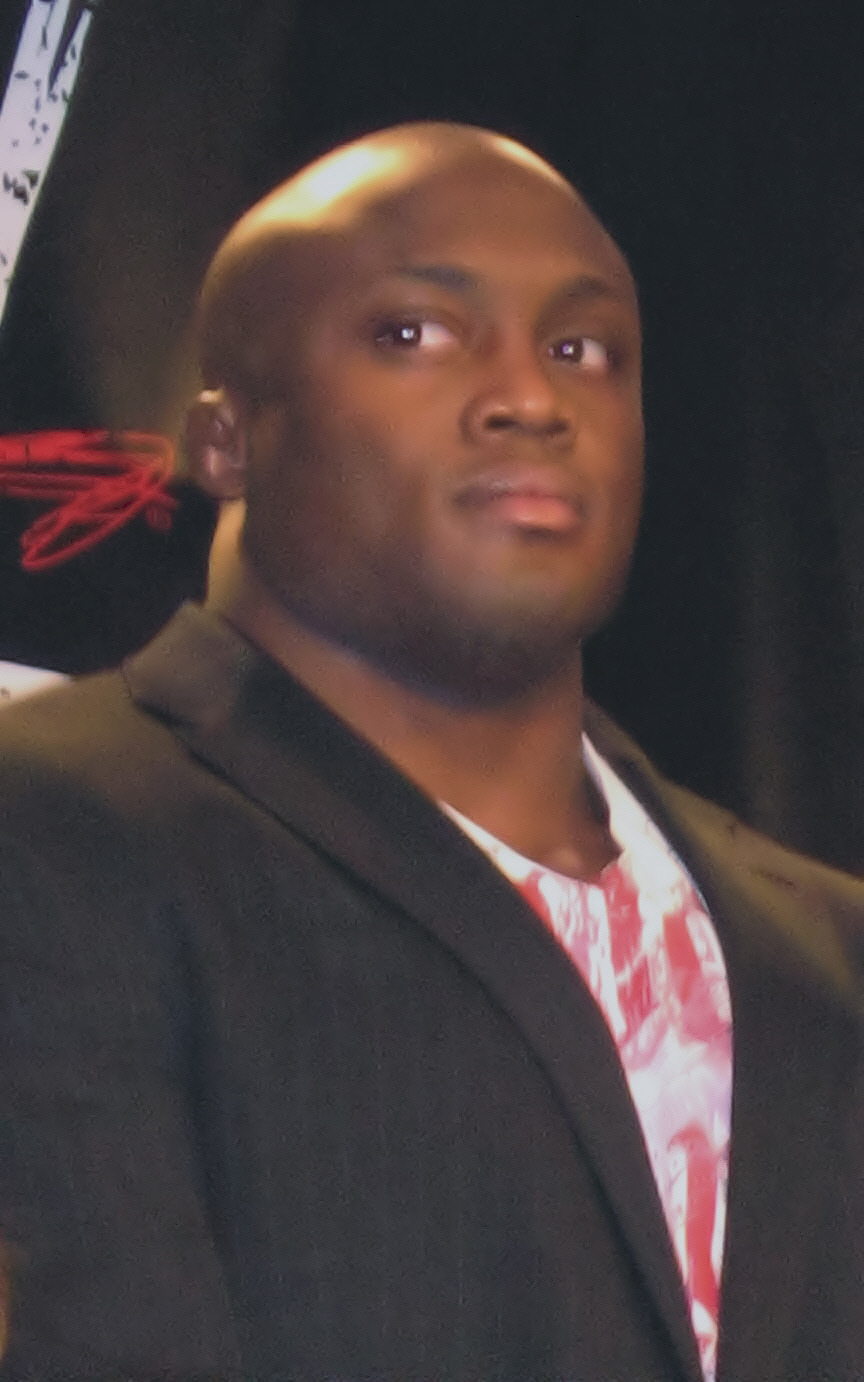
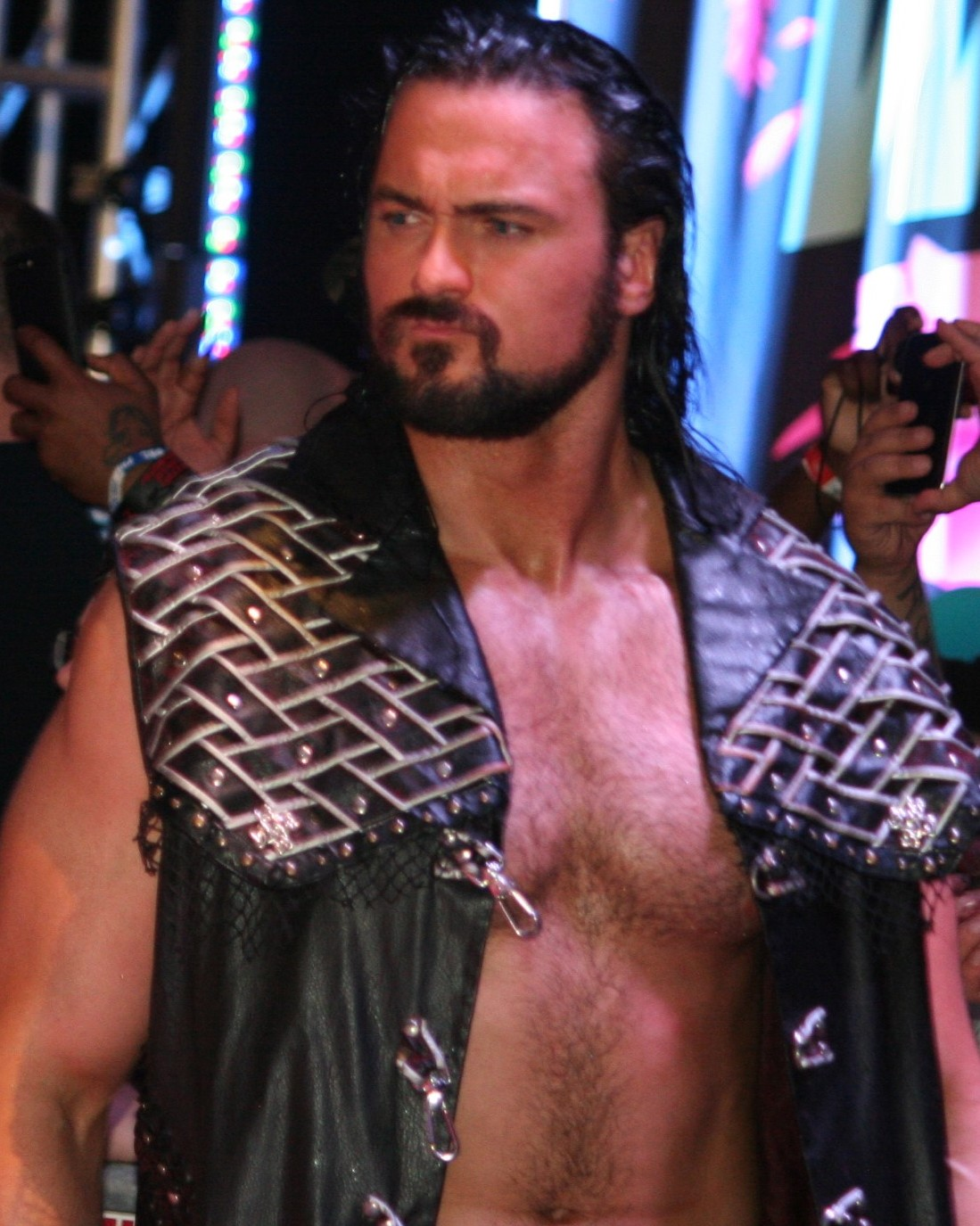
Bobby Lashley defended Raw's WWE Championship against Drew McIntyre in the opening match of Night 1.

At Elimination Chamber, Drew McIntyre won Raw's Elimination Chamber match to retain the WWE Championship. Following the match, however McIntyre was brutally attacked by Bobby Lashley, allowing The Miz to cash-in his Money in the Bank contract and win the title. As part of an agreement that Miz made with Lashley's Hurt Business manager MVP, Miz was scheduled to defend the championship against Lashley, who defeated Miz in a lumberjack match to win the title on the March 1 episode of Raw. On the March 15 episode, Lashley claimed that he destroyed McIntyre at Elimination Chamber and would do it again at WrestleMania 37, confirming that Lashley would defend the title against McIntyre at the event. McIntyre came out and congratulated Lashley on becoming champion, noting how they both had a long road to winning the WWE Championship—16 years for Lashley and 17 years for McIntyre. However, McIntyre mocked Lashley, as McIntyre first won the championship at WrestleMania 36 by defeating Brock Lesnar, whereas Lashley won the championship by making an underhanded deal and defeating Miz on an episode of Raw. McIntyre then declared that he would win back the championship at WrestleMania. The following week, McIntyre defeated The Hurt Business's Cedric Alexander and Shelton Benjamin in a handicap match, barring Alexander and Benjamin from ringside during the WWE Championship match at WrestleMania, which was confirmed to open Night 1.

Incensed at being left out of Raw's Elimination Chamber match, Braun Strowman took issue with WWE officials Shane McMahon and Adam Pearce. After a failed attempt to rectify things with Strowman, Shane then began to insult Strowman's intelligence. Strowman then challenged Shane to a match on the March 15 episode of Raw. The match, however, never officially started and the two instead brawled with Shane calling Strowman stupid. This led to a match being scheduled between the two at Fastlane. This match also did not take place due to Shane injuring his knee while training; he selected Elias as his replacement to face Strowman, who defeated Elias. The following night on Raw, Shane, along with Elias and Jaxson Ryker, continued to taunt Strowman, who came out and defeated Elias in a rematch. Following the match, Shane attacked Strowman with his crutch, revealing that Shane had feigned his injury. Shane then retreated, after which, Strowman challenged Shane to a match at WrestleMania 37, and Shane accepted. The following week, Strowman chose a Steel Cage match as the stipulation.

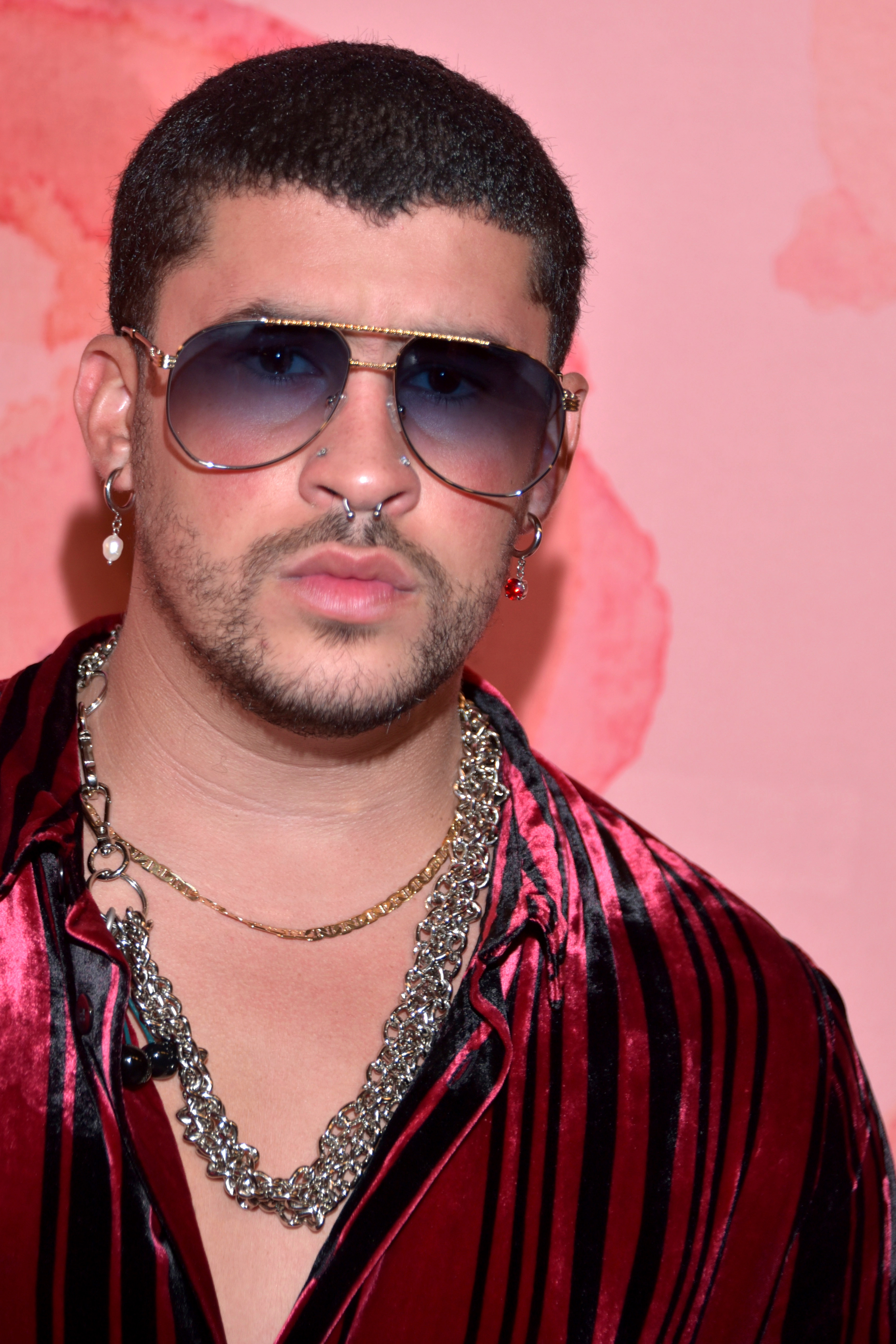
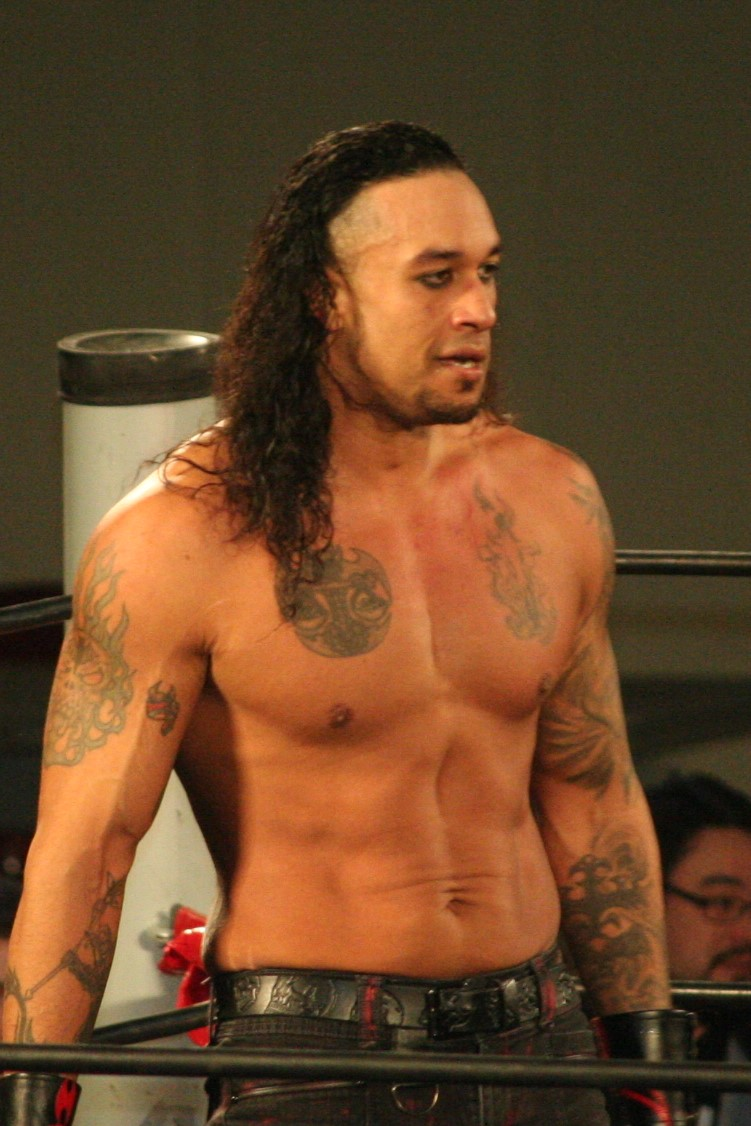
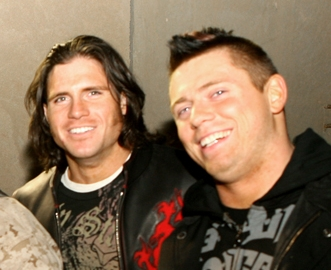
Rapper, singer, and record producer Bad Bunny teamed with Damian Priest to face John Morrison and The Miz on Night 1.

At the Royal Rumble, The Miz attempted to persuade rapper Bad Bunny, who had performed his song "Booker T" at the event, to a deal to become a WWE superstar under his tutelage; however, Bad Bunny rejected the offer. Later during the Royal Rumble match, as Miz made his entrance, he destroyed Bad Bunny's DJ equipment. An irate Bad Bunny came out and distracted Miz, allowing Damian Priest to eliminate him. The following night on Raw, Bad Bunny was a guest on "Miz TV". Miz apologized for his actions and Bad Bunny accepted the apology but did not apologize for his own actions. Bad Bunny then stated that one of his dreams was to become a WWE wrestler, which Miz again claimed he could help him with, but was again rejected. Bad Bunny then stated the only reason he was there was for his friend Priest, who made his Raw debut and defeated Miz in a match. Over the next few weeks, Miz and his tag team partner John Morrison continued to constantly taunt Bad Bunny. On the March 22 episode of Raw, Miz challenged Bad Bunny to a match at WrestleMania 37. Following Miz's match, Bad Bunny attacked Miz and accepted. However, after Miz and Morrison vandalized Bad Bunny's US$3 million Bugatti and attacked Bad Bunny on the April 5 episode, the stipulation of the match was changed as Priest and Bad Bunny challenged Miz and Morrison to a tag team match that Miz and Morrison accepted.

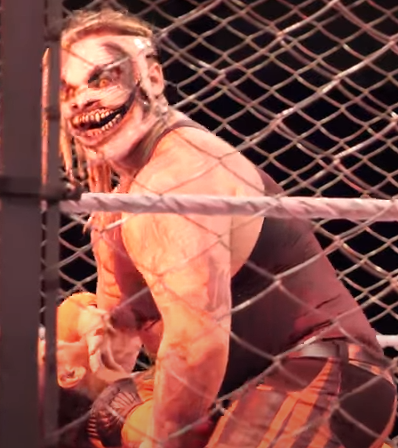
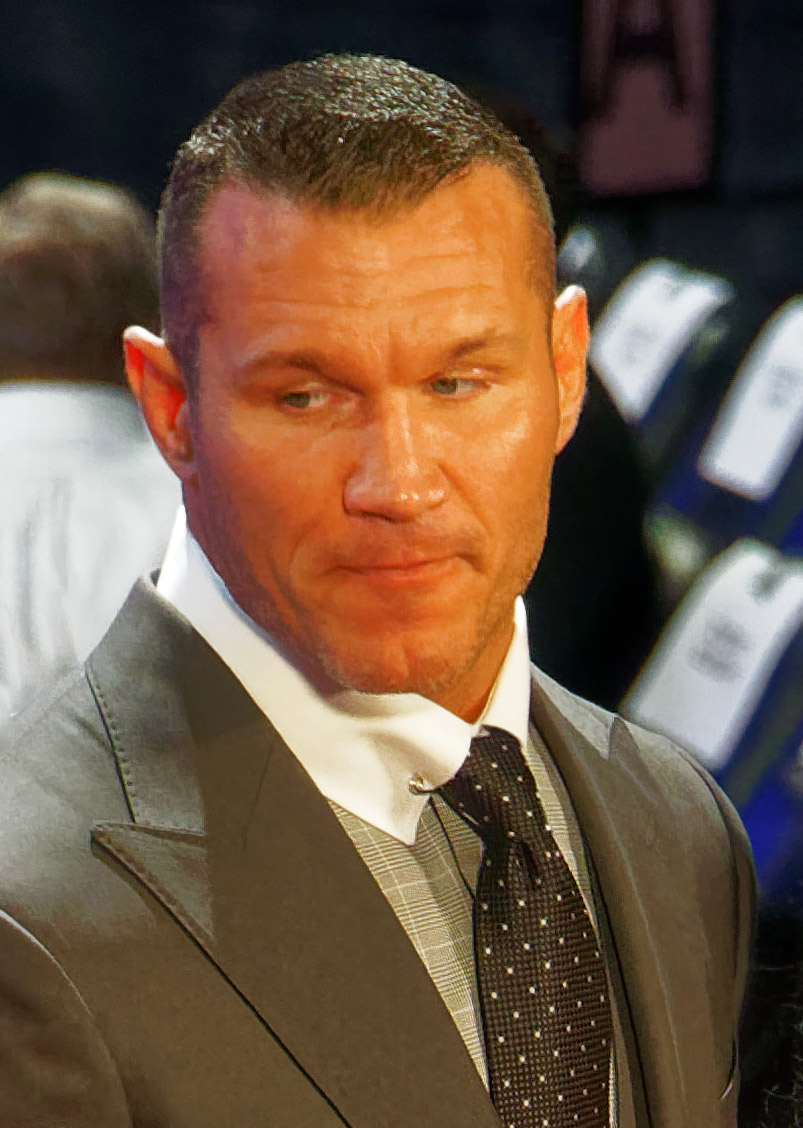
"The Fiend" Bray Wyatt faced Randy Orton in the opening match of Night 2, their second WrestleMania match against one another following WrestleMania 33.

At TLC: Tables, Ladders & Chairs in December 2020, Randy Orton defeated "The Fiend" Bray Wyatt in a Firefly Inferno match. After the match, Orton doused The Fiend's lifeless body in gasoline and set him on fire. Following this incident, Alexa Bliss, who had aligned with The Fiend months earlier, began to haunt Orton on a weekly basis, including causing him to lose multiple matches. On the March 15 episode of Raw, Bliss challenged Orton to an intergender match at Fastlane and Orton accepted in the hopes of ridding Bliss from his life. At Fastlane, Bliss defeated Orton, thanks to the return of The Fiend, who appeared very grotesque with charred skin. The following night on Raw, Orton attempted to summon The Fiend. Bliss appeared on the stage holding a jack-in-the-box signaling the return of The Fiend, after which, the lights went out. When they returned, The Fiend was standing in the ring. Orton performed an RKO on The Fiend, after which Bliss walked to the ring to taunt Orton. The Fiend then rose to his feet and attacked Orton with a Sister Abigail. Bliss then pointed to the WrestleMania sign, signaling a challenge, which was later confirmed.

After failing to defeat Big E for the Intercontinental Championship in January, Apollo Crews turned heel and began to embrace his royal Nigerian roots, including speaking with a Nigerian accent. On the February 19 episode of SmackDown, after Crews's loss against Shinsuke Nakamura where Big E was on commentary, Crews attacked Nakamura after the match. Big E aided Nakamura, however, Crews attacked Big E with the steel steps, taking him out of action for a couple of weeks. At Fastlane, Big E defeated Crews to retain the title once again, after which, Crews viciously attacked Big E. On the March 26 episode of SmackDown, Crews pinned Big E in a six-man tag team match. Another match between the two for the title was subsequently set for WrestleMania 37. The following week, Crews changed the stipulation of the match to a Nigerian Drum Fight.

On the March 22 episode of Raw, after Asuka's successful Raw Women's Championship defense, Rhea Ripley, making her main roster debut, challenged Asuka for the title at WrestleMania 37, and Asuka accepted.

On the March 22 episode of Raw, following Sheamus's loss, Sheamus attacked United States Champion Riddle with a scooter backstage. The following week, Sheamus again attacked Riddle backstage before defeating him in a non-title match later that night. Afterwards, Riddle sent Sheamus over the top rope, setting up a title match between the two at WrestleMania 37.

On the March 15 episode of Raw, after The New Day (Kofi Kingston and Xavier Woods) won the Raw Tag Team Championship for the fifth time as a team, a fifth time for Kingston, and a third time for Woods, they were confronted by AJ Styles and Omos, who challenged the champions for the title at WrestleMania 37, which was made official. This would be Omos's in-ring debut after serving as a bodyguard for Styles since his debut in October 2020.

On the February 12 episode of SmackDown, Seth Rollins returned to the SmackDown brand, stating he was the leader that SmackDown needed and that the SmackDown roster needed to "embrace the vision", prompting the locker room to walk out on him. Rollins then attacked Cesaro, who was the only one that stayed behind. The following week, Rollins stated that his moment was ruined by a "bunch of losers", and called Cesaro the biggest loser of them all. On the February 26 episode, after Rollins told Cesaro that he always came up short, Cesaro executed the Cesaro Swing on Rollins. Two weeks later, Rollins called Cesaro a "waste of talent". Later that night, Rollins interrupted Cesaro's match and performed two Stomps on him. As Rollins tried for a third Stomp, this time with Cesaro's head wrapped in a chair, officials stopped him. After Rollins won his match on the March 26 episode, Cesaro attacked him and attempted the Cesaro Swing again, but Rollins retreated. Backstage, Rollins challenged Cesaro to a match at WrestleMania 37, after which, Cesaro performed the Cesaro Swing on Rollins and accepted the challenge.

Ever since losing the Intercontinental Championship, Sami Zayn's gimmick was changed into a deranged conspiracy theorist who believed that WWE bosses were holding him down, with Zayn believing that he was the real Intercontinental Champion. In addition, a documentary crew followed him with cameras everywhere Zayn went. During SmackDown's Elimination Chamber match at Elimination Chamber, Zayn was eliminated by Kevin Owens. On the March 19 episode of SmackDown, Zayn pitched Owens to join his conspiracy documentary. Later that night, after Zayn lost his match, Zayn performed a Helluva Kick on Owens. The following week, Owens hosted "The KO Show", with Zayn as the special guest, after Zayn begged Owens to be a part of his documentary. Owens challenged Zayn to a match at WrestleMania 37, which Zayn accepted. On the April 2 episode, Zayn brought out Logan Paul and asked him to be the special guest cornerman for his match against Owens. After Paul and Zayn watched Zayn's documentary, Owens appeared and attacked Zayn before shoving Paul away.

On the April 5 episode of Raw, after months of feuding with each other over the WWE Women's Tag Team Championship, a tag team turmoil match between the teams of Dana Brooke and Mandy Rose, Ruby Riott and Liv Morgan, Lana and Naomi, and Natalya and Tamina was announced for Night 1 of WrestleMania 37, where the winners would earn a title match against defending champions Nia Jax and Shayna Baszler on Night 2. On that week's SmackDown, Billie Kay and Carmella were added to the match.

== Event ==
Both nights included a one-hour pre-show. WrestleMania 37 Kickoff – Night 1 previewed the matches for the first night's match card, while WrestleMania 37 Kickoff – Night 2 did the same for the second night. Unlike the previous events, neither pre-show included any matches. Both pre-shows aired on Peacock/WWE Network, and on WWE's social media platforms. The pre-show panel included host Kayla Braxton — joined by Jerry Lawler, Booker T, John "Bradshaw" Layfield, and Peter Rosenberg, as well as guest Sonya Deville.

=== Night 1 ===
Other on-screen personnel – Saturday
| Role | Name |
|---|---|
| Hosts | Hulk Hogan |
| Hosts | Titus O'Neil |
| English commentators | Michael Cole (Raw/Smackdown) |
| English commentators | Corey Graves (SmackDown) |
| English commentators | Samoa Joe (Raw) |
| English commentators | Byron Saxton (Raw) |
| English commentators | Jerry Lawler (Steel cage match) |
| English commentators | Booker T (Bunny & Priest vs. Miz & Morrison) |
| Portuguese commentators | Marco Alfaro |
| Portuguese commentators | Roberto Figueroa |
| Spanish commentators | Carlos Cabrera |
| Spanish commentators | Marcelo Rodriguez |
| Ring announcers | Greg Hamilton (SmackDown) |
| Ring announcers | Mike Rome (Raw) |
| Referees | Danilo Anfibio |
| Referees | Shawn Bennett |
| Referees | John Cone |
| Referees | Dan Engler |
| Referees | Eddie Orengo |
| Referees | Chad Patton |
| Referees | Ryan Tran |
| Interviewers | Kayla Braxton |
| Interviewers | Sarah Schreiber |
| Interviewers | Kevin Patrick |
| Pre-show panel | Kayla Braxton (host) |
| Pre-show panel | Jerry Lawler |
| Pre-show panel | Booker T |
| Pre-show panel | John "Bradshaw" Layfield |
| Pre-show panel | Peter Rosenberg |
| Pre-show panel | Sonya Deville (guest) |

==== Preliminary matches ====
The actual event opened with WWE chairman and chief executive officer Vince McMahon welcoming the fans in attendance back to WrestleMania, and back to a WWE event in over a year. This was then followed by Bebe Rexha performing "America the Beautiful". Shortly after, the event was put on hold for over 30 minutes due to inclement weather, marking the first-ever weather delay in WrestleMania history. During this time, various wrestlers were interviewed about their respective matches. The event eventually resumed with hosts Hulk Hogan and Titus O'Neil coming out to hype up the crowd.

In the first match, Bobby Lashley (accompanied by MVP) defended the WWE Championship against Drew McIntyre. During the match, Lashley performed a spinebuster on McIntyre for a nearfall. McIntyre performed an inverted Alabama Slam on Lashley for a nearfall. Lashley performed another spinebuster on McIntyre. McIntyre performed a belly-to-belly suplex and three consecutive Future Shock DDTs on Lashley for a nearfall. As McIntyre attempted the Claymore Kick, MVP brought Lashley outside of the ring, only for McIntyre to leap over the top rope to take both men out. Back inside the ring, McIntyre applied a kimura lock, but Lashley made it to the rope to escape. In the closing moments, McIntyre performed a Glasgow Kiss on Lashley and attempted a Claymore Kick, but MVP distracted McIntyre, allowing Lashley to avoid the move and apply the Hurt Lock. McIntyre was able to momentarily ease up the maneuver by kicking off the ropes, but Lashley kept the hold applied on McIntyre, who passed out, thus Lashley retained the title by technical submission.

Next, a tag team turmoil match was contested where the winners would face Nia Jax and Shayna Baszler for the WWE Women's Tag Team Championship on Night 2. The team of Lana and Naomi, and the team of Billie Kay and Carmella started the match. Kay and Carmella worked together, and eliminated Lana and Naomi with an assisted pinfall on Naomi. The Riott Squad (Liv Morgan and Ruby Riott) entered next. The Riott Squad quickly eliminated Kay and Carmella with a Gutbuster/Back Stomp combination on Kay. Dana Brooke and Mandy Rose entered next. Brooke and Rose were eliminated after Morgan pinned Brooke with an inside cradle. The final team to enter was Natalya and Tamina. In the end, Tamina performed a Superfly Splash on Riott to win the match thus securing the championship match on Night 2.

After that, Cesaro faced Seth Rollins. As Rollins went for The Stomp, Cesaro countered with the Cesaro Swing and locked in The Sharpshooter, however Rollins countered. Cesaro performed a Neutralizer on Rollins for a nearfall. As Cesaro attempted another Neutralizer, Rollins countered into the Pedigree for a nearfall. As Rollins went for another Stomp, Cesaro caught Rollins in mid-air with an uppercut. Cesaro then spun Rollins with the UFO and the Cesaro Swing before performing a second Neutralizer on Rollins to win the match.

In the fourth match, The New Day (Kofi Kingston and Xavier Woods), who were introduced by former stablemate Big E, defended the Raw Tag Team Championship against AJ Styles and Omos. Early on in the match, Kingston and Woods neutralized Styles to prevent him from tagging in Omos. Styles eventually tagged in Omos, who dominated Kingston and Woods. In the end, Styles performed the Phenomenal Forearm on Woods, and Omos performed a Powerbomb on Kingston and pinned him with one foot to win the titles. This win made Styles WWE's 32nd Triple Crown Champion and 22nd Grand Slam Champion, as well as the only wrestler to win the Grand Slam in both WWE and Total Nonstop Action Wrestling.

Next, Braun Strowman faced Shane McMahon in a Steel Cage match. Before Strowman could enter the cage, Elias and Jaxson Ryker attacked Strowman's leg with steel chairs. McMahon obtained the steel chair and constantly attacked Strowman with it as the match started. McMahon performed the Coast to Coast on Strowman for a nearfall. Elias and Ryker tried to interfere once again, however Strowman knocked them off the cage. McMahon obtained a toolbox and struck Strowman with it. As McMahon was climbing out of the cage, Strowman caught him, pulled apart a side of the cage, and pulled McMahon back inside the cage. Strowman then threw McMahon off the top of the cage. In the end, Strowman performed the Running Powerslam on McMahon to win the match.

In the penultimate match, Bad Bunny and Damian Priest faced the Miz and John Morrison. The Miz dominated Bad Bunny to prevent him from tagging in Priest. Bad Bunny eventually tagged in Priest. Bad Bunny and Priest performed a Falcon Arrow on the Miz and Morrison simultaneously. Outside the ring, Bad Bunny performed a Crossbody on the Miz and Morrison. The Miz performed the Skull Crushing Finale on Priest only for Bad Bunny to break up the pin attempt. Outside the ring, Bad Bunny performed a Canadian Destroyer on Morrison. In the end, Bad Bunny and Priest performed an Electric Chair Drop/Crossbody combination on the Miz, and Bad Bunny pinned Miz to win the match.

==== Main event ====
In the main event, Sasha Banks defended the SmackDown Women's Championship against Bianca Belair. This was also the first time two African-American wrestlers headlined a WrestleMania. During the match, Banks performed a Suicide Dive on Belair, who rolled through and held Banks over her head while walking up the steps and tossing her inside the ring. Later, Belair attempted a 450 Splash on Banks, but Banks raised her knees to block the maneuver. As Banks applied the Bank Statement while using Belair's braid as an advantage, Belair reached the ropes to void the submission. Belair eventually performed the 450 Splash on Banks for a nearfall. In the closing moments, Belair attempted the Kiss of Death, but Banks blocked and grabbed Belair's braid. Belair then whipped Banks with it. Afterwards, the two traded counters before Belair performed a Kiss of Death on Banks to win the title for the first time.

=== Night 2 ===
Other on-screen personnel – Sunday
| Role | Name |
|---|---|
| Hosts | Hulk Hogan |
| Hosts | Titus O'Neil |
| English commentators | Michael Cole (Raw/Smackdown) |
| English commentators | Corey Graves (SmackDown) |
| English commentators | Samoa Joe (Raw) |
| English commentators | Byron Saxton (Raw) |
| English commentators | John "Bradshaw" Layfield (Owens vs. Zayn) |
| Portuguese commentators | Marco Alfaro |
| Portuguese commentators | Roberto Figueroa |
| Spanish commentators | Carlos Cabrera |
| Spanish commentators | Marcelo Rodriguez |
| Ring announcers | Greg Hamilton (SmackDown) |
| Ring announcers | Mike Rome (Raw) |
| Referees | Jason Ayers |
| Referees | Shawn Bennett |
| Referees | Jessika Carr |
| Referees | John Cone |
| Referees | Darrick Moore |
| Referees | Charles Robinson |
| Referees | Rod Zapata |
| Pre-show panel | Kayla Braxton (host) |
| Pre-show panel | Jerry Lawler |
| Pre-show panel | Booker T |
| Pre-show panel | John "Bradshaw" Layfield |
| Pre-show panel | Peter Rosenberg |
| Pre-show panel | Sonya Deville (guest) |

==== Preliminary matches ====
The actual event opened with Ashland Craft performing "America the Beautiful". Hosts Hulk Hogan and Titus O'Neil came out in pirate outfits to hype the crowd.

The first match saw Randy Orton face The Fiend. Before the Fiend made his entrance, a short video clip was shown where the Fiend became healed and returned to his original unburnt Fiend attire, though with an altered top. Then, Alexa Bliss came out and turned the handle of a giant jack-in-the-box at ringside and the Fiend emerged from the box. The Fiend leapt off the box onto Orton and the match began. The Fiend applied the Mandible Claw twice on Orton, however Orton escaped both times. As the Fiend attempted a Sister Abigail, pyro erupted from the turnbuckles and Bliss, who was perched atop the jack-in-the-box, distracted the Fiend with black liquid oozing down her face. This allowed Orton to perform the RKO on the Fiend to win the match. After the match, the Fiend stared at Bliss. The lights then went out and when they illuminated, the Fiend and Bliss were gone.

Next, Nia Jax and Shayna Baszler defended the WWE Women's Tag Team Championship against Natalya and Tamina. Tamina performed a Samoan Drop on Baszler for a nearfall. Jax performed a Crossbody onto Natalya and Tamina, however she landed awkwardly on her knee. As Tamina attempted for the Superfly Splash, Jax moved out of the way. In the end, Natalya attempted to apply the Sharpshooter on Jax, unaware that Baszler was the legal partner. Baszler then applied the Kirifuda Clutch on Natalya, who passed out, to retain the titles by technical submission.

After that, Sami Zayn faced Kevin Owens with Logan Paul at ringside for Zayn. Owens immediately performed the Pop-Up Powerbomb on Zayn. Zayn performed a Brainbuster to Owens on the ring apron. Zayn performed the Blue Thunder Bomb on Owens for a nearfall. In the end, Owens performed a Fisherman's Suplex on Zayn off the second rope. Zayn performed the Helluva Kick on Owens, and as Zayn attempted another Helluva Kick, Owens countered and performed two Superkicks and a Stunner on Zayn to win the match. Following the match, Paul attempted to congratulate Owens on his victory which enraged Zayn. Zayn then got into an altercation with Paul, who then shoved him in the ring. Paul then raised Owens' hand in celebration, after which Owens performed a Stunner on Paul.

In the fourth match, Riddle defended the United States Championship against Sheamus. In the end, as Riddle was performing a moonsault, Sheamus caught him in midair with a Brogue Kick, which busted Riddle's mouth open, allowing Sheamus to pin Riddle and win the title.

A pre-taped advertisement then aired showing Triple H confronting Bad Bunny. Triple H thanked Bad Bunny and congratulated him on his performance during Night 1. He then stated it was time for Bad Bunny to return to his music career, thus announcing Bad Bunny's 2022 concert tour.

Next, Big E defended the Intercontinental Championship against Apollo Crews in the first-ever Nigerian Drum Fight, which was a No Holds Barred match with African drums surrounding the ring that could also be used as weapons. Big E and Crews immediately retrieved kendo sticks and attacked each other with them. In the end, as Crews attempted a Frog Splash, Big E moved out of the way, sending Crews through a table. Big E performed the Big Ending on Crews, only for a mysterious large man (formerly known as Dabba-Kato) to emerge from through the crowd and perform a Chokeslam on Big E, allowing Crews to pin him and win the title.

In the penultimate match, Asuka defended the Raw Women's Championship against Rhea Ripley. In the end, Asuka performed a DDT on Ripley off the apron to the ringside floor. In the ring, Asuka applied the Asuka Lock on Ripley, but Ripley was able to escape. Ripley then performed the Riptide on Asuka to win the title.

Hosts Hulk Hogan and Titus O'Neil then came out to thank the fans. They were interrupted by Bayley, who claimed that she was tired of being disrespected by the legends. Recent WWE Hall of Fame inductees The Bella Twins (Brie Bella and Nikki Bella) then came out, attacked Bayley and sent her rolling down the ramp.

==== Main event ====
In the main event, Roman Reigns (accompanied by Paul Heyman and Jey Uso) defended the Universal Championship against Edge and Daniel Bryan. During the match, Jey interfered and attacked both Edge and Bryan with superkicks. Edge then performed the Edgecution on Jey onto the steel steps, taking Jey out for the majority of the match. Bryan performed a running knee on Edge. Edge locked Reigns in the crossface and Bryan simultaneously locked Reigns in the Yes! Lock. Both Edge and Bryan broke each other's submissions by headbutting each other. Edge performed a spear on Reigns, only for Bryan to pull the referee out of the ring. Edge obtained steel chairs and performed the Con-Chair-To on Bryan. In the closing moments, Jey returned and attacked Edge. After Edge performed a spear on Jey, Reigns intercepted Edge with his own Spear. Reigns then performed the Con-Chair-To on Edge and then laid Edge's body across Bryan's and pinned both at the same time to retain the title, as well as becoming the sixth heel to win in the main event of WrestleMania.

== Reception ==
After Bray Wyatt's loss against Randy Orton at the event, various personalities like UFC's Daniel Cormier, John Cena Sr., Booker T, Erick Rowan, and Mark Madden showed support to Wyatt and criticized his booking treatment in WWE.

The event received generally positive reviews from critics. Dave Meltzer of the Wrestling Observer Newsletter rated Cesaro vs. Rollins and the main event 4 stars, the highest rated matches on Night 1. In 2026, Lash Legend named the Bianca Belair vs. Sasha Banks SmackDown Women's Championship match as her favorite wrestling match of all time, saying the match "speaks to me the most" because of where she was in her WWE journey and how she visualized herself in that position. The highest rated match of Night 2 was the main event triple threat match, which received 4.5 stars out of 5. Asuka vs. Ripley received 3.75 out of 5 stars, the US Title match received 4 stars out of 5, and the Intercontinental Title match was rated 3 out of 5 stars. Wyatt vs. Orton received criticism and a -1 star rating, making it the lowest rated match across both nights.

According to WWE, the event accumulated a record 1.1 billion video views across their various video and social media channels, marking a 14% increase year-over-year. WWE content also garnered a record 115 million engagement on social media during the week of WrestleMania, a 102% increase. In addition, on-site merchandise sales were said to be the highest per capita in WWE history.

=== Attendance ===
During both nights of the event, WWE claimed that they had sold out of all available tickets, which were capped at 25,000 per night; however, the company claimed an attendance of 25,675 spectators for each night, totaling 51,350 combined. These numbers were disputed. According to records from the Tampa Sports Authority, which maintains Raymond James Stadium, the first night actually sold 20,172 tickets, while the second night sold 20,634 for an actual total of 40,806 tickets sold, both to fans and scalpers. The actual attendance was also lower than the number of tickets sold. For the first night, there were 17,946 spectators while the second night had 18,501, totaling an actual attendance of 36,447 spectators combined. In a conference call in February 2017, Vince McMahon admitted that the company inflates these numbers and includes the venue's personnel as well as WWE personnel in their claimed numbers. Despite the inflated numbers, the event grossed $6.2 million in revenue for WWE.

== Aftermath ==
WrestleMania 37 would be the final WWE appearance for Billie Kay, as well as Raw commentator Samoa Joe, as both were released on April 15. However, Joe returned to NXT in June and went on to win the NXT Championship that August, but relinquished it shortly afterwards, and was released a second time on January 6, 2022.

After being hosted at Tropicana Field in St. Petersburg, Florida since December 11, 2020, the WWE ThunderDome was relocated to the Yuengling Center in Tampa. The following night's Raw was the first broadcast of WWE programming produced from the ThunderDome at the Yuengling Center. This relocation was due to the start of the Tampa Bay Rays's 2021 season, as Tropicana Field is their home venue. WWE then returned to live touring with full capacity crowds in mid-July for Raw and SmackDown. NXT remained at the Performance Center and in September, it was rebranded as "NXT 2.0", reverting to being WWE's developmental brand and also dropping the Capitol Wrestling Center name and format, with further events being promoted as from the Performance Center without COVID restrictions. Because WrestleMania 37 had to be held at a reduced venue capacity, WWE went as far as to promote their next "Big Four" PPV, SummerSlam, as their "biggest event of 2021".

=== Raw ===
On the following episode of Raw, MVP declared that no one could defeat Bobby Lashley for the WWE Championship. Drew McIntyre then interrupted and wanted another opportunity at Lashley, promising to take out Lashley with a Claymore Kick as he was unable to do it at WrestleMania due to a distraction from MVP. Braun Strowman and Randy Orton then interrupted and stated their respective cases to challenge for the title; Orton's for defeating The Fiend, putting that rivalry behind him and allowing him to focus on pursuing the WWE Championship, and Strowman's for defeating Shane McMahon in a Steel Cage match. WWE official Adam Pearce came out and scheduled a triple threat match between McIntyre, Strowman, and Orton with the winner facing Lashley for the WWE Championship at WrestleMania Backlash, which McIntyre won. Strowman, however, defeated McIntyre on the April 26 episode, thus he was added to the championship match, making it a triple threat match. At the event, Lashley retained. Lashley and McIntyre would have another title match at Hell in a Cell, this time as a Hell in a Cell match, where Lashley again retained. This was also McIntyre's last chance at the WWE Championship as long as Lashley was the champion, thus ending their feud.

Also on Raw, new Raw Women's Champion Rhea Ripley defended the title against Asuka in a rematch. The match ended in a no-contest after interference from a returning Charlotte Flair, who attacked Asuka. Prior to the match, Flair, who was absent from TV for the past month, returned that night after missing her first WrestleMania; she first competed at WrestleMania 32 in April 2016 and had competed at the event every year since. On the May 3 episode, another rematch between Ripley and Asuka for the Raw Women's Championship was scheduled for WrestleMania Backlash. Additionally, WWE official Sonya Deville allowed Flair a chance to present a proposal. After hearing Flair's case, Deville added Flair to the championship match to make it a triple threat match.

During a segment of "Alexa's Playground", Alexa Bliss explained her actions at WrestleMania 37. Bliss stated that, before meeting the Fiend, she had been lost, and that the Fiend had nurtured her and taught her everything he knew, however he then went away after Randy Orton burned him alive. After months of attempting to bring him back, she realized that she did not need him anymore. Bliss then introduced her new friend, a demonic looking doll named Lilly. Bray Wyatt's cheery normal-self also made his return in a "Firefly Fun House" segment. He stated it was good to be back with his true friends and he was looking forward to a new start. This would in turn be Wyatt's final appearance in WWE until he returned at Extreme Rules in October 2022, as after being absent for the next few months, he was released from his contract on July 31.

The Miz hosted a segment of "Miz TV" along with John Morrison, which also saw the return of Miz's wife Maryse to WWE programming, who last appeared in December 2019. Miz bragged and claimed that he turned Bad Bunny into a WWE superstar. Damian Priest interrupted and praised Bad Bunny and then challenged Miz and Morrison to a handicap match. Priest lost the match after Miz pinned him with a rollup and used the ropes as leverage while Maryse also assisted. This ultimately led to a match between Priest and Miz at WrestleMania Backlash, and it was stipulated as a lumberjack match.

Backstage, WWE Women's Tag Team Champions Nia Jax and Shayna Baszler were re-watching and laughing at Dana Brooke and Mandy Rose's entrance at WrestleMania 37 where Rose had slipped and fell. Jax and Baszler were confronted by Brooke and Rose. Jax handled the situation herself while Baszler departed, resulting in Rose slapping Jax and Brooke assisted Rose in shoving her to the ground. The two teams later competed in a non-title match. During the match, Jax slipped on the ring apron twice, prompting Brooke and Rose to laugh at Jax. Brooke and Rose took a countout loss to not deal with Jax's anger. The following week, during Jax and Baszler's match against Naomi and Lana, Brooke and Rose showed footage of Jax slipping on the ring apron, causing Jax to go after them, and for Baszler to get pinned. On the April 26 episode, Jax and Baszler defeated Naomi and Lana's team in a six-woman tag team match; during the match, Rose and Brooke threw a bucket of water on Baszler. Jax ran after them, but slipped on the water. The following week, Jax and Baszler successfully retained the WWE Women's Tag Team Championship against Naomi and Lana.

After new United States Champion Sheamus was absent on the Raw after WrestleMania, he appeared the following week. Sheamus declared that he was a fighting champion and he would issue an open challenge for the title every week, or whenever he felt like it. Humberto Carrillo then came out to answer the challenge, but Sheamus attacked Carillo before the match could start.

After taking a vacation to celebrate their win, new Raw Tag Team Champions AJ Styles and Omos made their first post-WrestleMania appearance on the May 3 episode of Raw. The New Day (Kofi Kingston and Xavier Woods) received a championship rematch that night, where Styles and Omos retained.

=== SmackDown ===
On the following SmackDown, Universal Champion Roman Reigns, along with Paul Heyman and Jey Uso, boasted about retaining his championship over Edge and Daniel Bryan. Reigns was then interrupted by Cesaro, who had a stare down with Reigns, and glanced at the Universal Championship. However, before Cesaro could speak, Reigns, Jey, and Heyman left the ring and departed backstage. Later backstage, Cesaro confronted Adam Pearce and Sonya Deville about facing Reigns that night, even as a non-title match. However, instead of Reigns, Cesaro faced Jey in the main event, which ended by disqualification when Seth Rollins interfered and attacked Cesaro, proclaiming that their rivalry was not over. The following week, instead of giving Cesaro a title match, Reigns gave Bryan one final opportunity at the title with the added stipulation that if Bryan lost, he would have to leave the SmackDown brand. Bryan agreed that the stipulation would be a Championship vs. Career match and it occurred on the April 30 episode, where Reigns retained. Bryan left SmackDown and WWE shortly after the match.

On the May 7 episode of SmackDown, Cesaro faced and defeated Seth Rollins in a rematch to earn a Universal Championship match against Roman Reigns at WrestleMania Backlash. Cesaro was unsuccessful in winning the title, and was attacked by Rollins after the match. They had another rematch at Hell in a Cell that Rollins won. The two had one further match on the July 9 episode of SmackDown, where Rollins again defeated Cesaro, which was also a qualifying match for the men's Money in the Bank ladder match.

After being absent since WrestleMania 37, Edge made his return to SmackDown on the June 25 episode and attacked Roman Reigns and Jimmy Uso, who had since returned from injury. Edge was then granted a rematch for the Universal Championship at Money in the Bank, this time as a one-on-one match that he was originally supposed to have at WrestleMania. At the event, Reigns retained after interference from Seth Rollins, who lost the men's Money in the Bank ladder match earlier that night, and felt like Edge cut in line in front of him. This eventually led to a match between Edge and Rollins being scheduled for SummerSlam.

Also on the following episode of SmackDown, The Street Profits (Angelo Dawkins and Montez Ford, the latter of whom is Bianca Belair's real-life husband) threw Belair a victory party for winning the SmackDown Women's Championship. During the party, Belair thanked Sasha Banks for making history at the event. Backstage, a furious Banks was interviewed only to storm off the set. Later, Bayley declared that she would be Belair's next challenger, which was scheduled for WrestleMania Backlash. After her brief appearance on the SmackDown after WrestleMania 37, Banks took time off but made her return during the July 30 episode, saving Belair from an attack by Carmella and Zelina Vega, who each wanted to challenge Belair for the title. Banks and Belair then teamed up and defeated Carmella and Vega, but after the match, Banks turned on and attacked Belair. A rematch between Banks and Belair for the title was later scheduled for SummerSlam. However, Banks was pulled from the event, and was replaced by another challenger who defeated Belair for the title. Banks and Belair would have their match on the October 1 episode of SmackDown, where Banks was victorious.

Sami Zayn claimed that he lost to Kevin Owens at WrestleMania because he was distracted wondering if Logan Paul was okay. Zayn then called out Owens for a rematch, which was accepted by Owens, who defeated Zayn by count-out after Zayn retreated from the ring. Following the match, Owens chased Zayn and brought him back to the ring, after which Owens performed a Stunner on Zayn. After several weeks of Zayn being a hindrance to Owens, the two had another rematch at Hell in a Cell where Zayn won. The two had one further match on the July 2 episode of SmackDown, where Owens defeated Zayn in a Last Man Standing match, which was also a qualifying match for the men's Money in the Bank ladder match.

New Intercontinental Champion Apollo Crews boasted about winning the championship. He introduced his new ally, Commander Azeez, who helped him win the title. Crews stated that Azeez was a former member of the Nigerian Elite Army and he would have given Big E a rematch for the title that night, however Big E was absent. Big E received a rematch against Crews for the title on the April 30 episode, only for the match to end via disqualification after Azeez interfered and attacked Big E.

After Natalya and Tamina failed to defeat WWE Women's Tag Team Champions Nia Jax and Shayna Baszler, Natalya faced Baszler on SmackDown where Natalya was victorious. After the match, Jax attempted to attack Natalya, only for Tamina to attack Jax. On the April 30 episode, Natalya and Tamina defeated Jax and Baszler in a non-title match. This win earned Natalya and Tamina another title match, which occurred on the May 14 episode where they defeated Jax and Baszler to win the WWE Women's Tag Team Championship.

== Results ==
Night 1 (April 10)
| No. | Results | Stipulations | Times |
|---|---|---|---|
| 1 | Bobby Lashley (c) (with MVP) defeated Drew McIntyre by technical submission | Singles match for the WWE Championship | 18:20 |
| 2 | Natalya and Tamina won by last eliminating The Riott Squad (Liv Morgan and Ruby Riott) | Tag Team Turmoil match Winners received a WWE Women's Tag Team Championship match on Night 2. | 14:15 |
| 3 | Cesaro defeated Seth Rollins by pinfall | Singles match | 11:35 |
| 4 | AJ Styles and Omos defeated The New Day (Kofi Kingston and Xavier Woods) (c) by pinfall | Tag team match for the WWE Raw Tag Team Championship | 9:45 |
| 5 | Braun Strowman defeated Shane McMahon by pinfall | Steel Cage match | 11:25 |
| 6 | Bad Bunny and Damian Priest defeated The Miz and John Morrison by pinfall | Tag team match | 15:02 |
| 7 | Bianca Belair defeated Sasha Banks (c) by pinfall | Singles match for the WWE SmackDown Women's Championship | 17:15 |
(c) / – the champion(s) heading into the match

Night 2 (April 11)
| No. | Results | Stipulations | Times |
|---|---|---|---|
| 1 | Randy Orton defeated The Fiend (with Alexa Bliss) by pinfall | Singles match | 5:50 |
| 2 | Nia Jax and Shayna Baszler (c) defeated Natalya and Tamina by technical submission | Tag team match for the WWE Women's Tag Team Championship | 14:20 |
| 3 | Kevin Owens defeated Sami Zayn (with Logan Paul) by pinfall | Singles match | 9:20 |
| 4 | Sheamus defeated Riddle (c) by pinfall | Singles match for the WWE United States Championship | 10:51 |
| 5 | Apollo Crews defeated Big E (c) by pinfall | Nigerian Drum Fight for the WWE Intercontinental Championship | 6:50 |
| 6 | Rhea Ripley defeated Asuka (c) by pinfall | Singles match for the WWE Raw Women's Championship | 13:30 |
| 7 | Roman Reigns (c) (with Paul Heyman and Jey Uso) defeated Edge and Daniel Bryan by pinfall | Triple threat match for the WWE Universal Championship | 22:40 |
(c) / – the champion(s) heading into the match

=== Tag Team Turmoil match ===
| Eliminated | Wrestler | Team | Entered | Eliminated by | Method of elimination | Times |
|---|---|---|---|---|---|---|
| 1 | Naomi | Lana and Naomi | 1 | Billie Kay and Carmella | Pinned after an assisted pinfall | 2:20 |
| 2 | Billie Kay | Billie Kay and Carmella | 2 | The Riott Squad (Liv Morgan and Ruby Riott) | Pinned after a Gutbuster/Back Stomp combination | 4:55 |
| 3 | Dana Brooke | Dana Brooke and Mandy Rose | 4 | The Riott Squad (Liv Morgan and Ruby Riott) | Pinned after an inside cradle | 9:20 |
| 4 | Ruby Riott | The Riott Squad (Liv Morgan and Ruby Riott) | 3 | Natalya and Tamina | Pinned after a Superfly Splash | 14:15 |
| Winners | Natalya and Tamina | | 5 | —N/a | | 14:15 |
