= El Último Tour Del Mundo =

2020 studio album by Bad Bunny

Studio album by Bad Bunny
- Released: November 27, 2020
- Recorded: 2020
- Studio: Home studio (Puerto Rico); Mexico; Los Angeles
- Genre: Latin trap; reggaeton; alternative rock
- Length: 47:14
- Language: Spanish
- Label: Rimas
- Producer: Bass Charity; Caleb Calloway; Chris Jedi; De la Cruz; Elikai; Foreign Teck; Gaby Music; Hazen; La Paciencia; Lara Project; Mag; Mick Coogan; Maux; Mora; Mr. NaisGai; Súbelo Neo; Tainy; Trio Vegabajeño

Bad Bunny chronology
Las Que No Iban a Salir (2020)	El Último Tour Del Mundo (2020)	Un Verano Sin Ti (2022)

Singles from El Último Tour del Mundo
- 1. "Dakiti" Released: October 30, 2020; 2. "Yo Visto Así" Released: November 27, 2020; 3. "Hoy Cobré" Released: December 11, 2020; 4. "Booker T" Released: January 2, 2021; 5. "La Noche de Anoche" Released: February 14, 2021; 6. "Te Deseo Lo Mejor" Released: December 24, 2021

El Último Tour Del Mundo (pronounced [el ˈultimo ˈtuɾ ðel ˈmundo]; transl. The Final World Tour, stylized in all caps) is the third solo studio album (fourth overall) by Puerto Rican rapper and singer Bad Bunny. It was released on November 27, 2020, by Rimas Entertainment, only nine months after the release of his previous record YHLQMDLG, which achieved both commercial success and critical acclaim. Comprising sixteen tracks, it is primarily a Latin trap and reggaeton album infused with a variety of rock music styles, and features guest appearances from Jhay Cortez, Rosalía, Abra, and Trio Vegabajeño. Production was primarily and executively handled by Mag, alongside Tainy, Chris Jedi, Gaby Music and Mora, among others. The album's title refers to how Bad Bunny imagined what his last concert tour would look like, as he imagined his final tour in the year 2032. The album was written and recorded during the COVID-19 quarantine.

It became the first all-Spanish-language album to reach number one on the US Billboard 200. El Ultimo Tour Del Mundo was the best-selling Latin album in the United States of 2021 and was the most consumed and streamed album in Mexico, Colombia, Chile, and Argentina that year. The album won Best Urban Music Album at the 22nd Annual Latin Grammy Awards, as well as the inaugural Best Música Urbana Album award at the 64th Grammy Awards. In promotion of the album and YHLQMDLG, he embarked on the eponymous El Último Tour Del Mundo in 2022.

== Background and singles ==
Bad Bunny first teased his third studio album on February 29, 2020, when he sang on the song "<3": "this album is so hot, I did it for you all, and in nine months I'll come back and release another one; to retire pleasingly like Miguel Cotto". On October 30, the lead single of the album, "Dakiti", featuring Puerto Rican singer and close friend Jhay Cortez was released, reaching number one on the Billboard Global 200 chart. The album's title was teased in the video for "Dakiti", in which a big truck drives by with a message that displays the title. On November 24, 2020, he again hinted at a new album, tweeting a numbered tracklist with the word "Temazo", which translates to "hit". He posted a similar post on Twitter before YHLQMDLG was released. The day after, he announced the release date of the album, its title, and tracklist. The album was released along with a video for the single "Yo Visto Así", featuring cameos from, among others, Ricky Martin and Sofía Vergara. A video for the track "Hoy Cobré" was released on December 11. A video for another track, "Booker T", was released on January 2, 2021, starring WWE wrestler Booker T. A video for "Te Deseo Lo Mejor" was made in collaboration with The Simpsons.

== Composition and recording ==
El Último Tour Del Mundo is primarily a Latin trap and reggaeton album, infused with a variety of rock music styles, namely alternative rock, indie rock, pop rock, punk rock, post-punk, pop-punk, heavy metal, emo, grunge, rock en español, rock and roll, post-grunge, and nu metal, as well as influences from alternative pop, synth-pop, new wave, synthwave, electronic, reggae, dancehall, lo-fi, acoustic, shoegaze, house, ballad, psychedelia, soul, sandungueo, Christmas, holiday, bolero, jíbaro, aguinaldo, pop, hip-hop, and R&B.

El Último Tour Del Mundo has been regarded as Bad Bunny's "most personal and creatively ambitious work yet". An "experimental, futuristic and edgy" body of work, the album marks a departure from Bad Bunny's perreo style, as it is a "more introspective, sometimes acoustic fare" and contains only two collaborations: one with R&B artist Abra and the other with Rosalía ("La Noche de Anoche"). Both songs were recorded separately, due to the COVID-19 pandemic. Regarding the lack of guest appearances, Bad Bunny stated: "I thought it was time to demonstrate the versatility and bring something fresh to the fans". He called the album "completely different from YHLQMDLG. This is a more sentimental album, more chill, the kind of thing you can listen to in your room"; he considered how people were unable to go out or party during the COVID-19 pandemic. He described the album as "rock 'n' roll, a lot of guitars–there's one song that only has guitar–it's more musical, has more fusions, and also reggaetón and rap". The album was conceived entirely during the 2020 quarantine. Bad Bunny worked on the album while traveling, in Los Angeles, Mexico, and at his home in Puerto Rico. The album was engineered by Bad Bunny's frequent engineer La Paciencia.

== Critical reception ==
Professional ratings
Aggregate scores
Source	Rating
Metacritic	83/100
Review scores
Source	Rating
AllMusic	4/5 stars
Pitchfork	7.7/10
Rolling Stone	4/5 stars

At Metacritic, which assigns a normalised rating out of 100 to reviews from mainstream critics, the album has an average score of 83 based on four reviews, indicating "universal acclaim".

Thom Jurek of AllMusic named the album Bad Bunny's "most adventurous outing" which may take longtime fans "a few listens to fully grasp" but it will ultimately "leave its infectious hooks, earworms, and strangeness fully embedded." Writing for Remezcla, Diego Urdaneta noticed that Bad Bunny is "more interested in his artistic legacy than predictability", which the writer considers is "a blueprint for many artists to follow in order to break the barriers of mainstream Latin music and dare to innovate within reggaetón and trap," as the artist mostly did not feature songs that can be categorized as club appealing. Matthew Ismael Ruiz of Pitchfork commented that El Último Tour Del Mundo "gets at the core of what makes Bad Bunny so appealing", presenting a wide range of influences with a genuine connection to his music and persona, while he also "toes the line" between rap braggadocio and "vulnerable everyman" with "relative ease." Ruiz argued that it is not Bad Bunny's best release, but "that's almost beside the point." Julyssa Lopez of Rolling Stone deemed the album "a defiant industry game-changer lit up by streaks of rock guitar," and "an eccentric good time" that "isn't by any means a repudiation of the genres that have made Bad Bunny a star; if anything, it's proof of how far they can stretch."

Verónica Bastardo of The Quietus noticed that Bad Bunny decided to put "the dembow rhythms and party vibes aside" to experiment with "the fuzzed-up guitars and iconoclasm of punk rock" creating "fresh sound narratives" in a rather "monotone" reggaeton music scene. Gary Suarez of Vulture.com described the album as "polarizing by design" that "reflects the exciting uncertainty of the future", and considered that his three solo studio albums "showcase the Bunny we know—sensitive yet cocksure, playful yet determined." He further compared the "universally adored" YHLQMDLG to the "individualistic, left of center" El Último Tour Del Mundo.

== Awards and nominations ==
Award	Year	Category	Result	Ref.
American Music Awards	2021	Favorite Album – Latin	Won	
Grammy Awards	2022	Best Música Urbana Album	Won	
Latin Grammy Awards	2020	Album of the Year	Nominated	
Latin Grammy Awards	2020	Best Urban Music Album	Won	
Premios Lo Nuestro	2022	Album of the Year	Won	
Premios Lo Nuestro	2022	Lo Nuestro Award for Urban Album of the Year	Won	
Billboard Latin Music Awards	2021	Top Latin Album of the Year	Nominated	
Billboard Latin Music Awards	2021	Latin Rhythm Album of the Year	Nominated	

== Commercial performance ==
El Último Tour Del Mundo debuted at number one on the US Billboard 200 with 116,000 becoming the first all-Spanish-language album to top the chart. It earned Bad Bunny his fourth top 10 entry. Before El Último Tour Del Mundo, only two mostly Spanish-sung albums reached number one on the chart, Selena's Dreaming of You (1995) and Il Divo's Ancora (2006). It also became the fourth all-Spanish language album to enter the top five, the others being Shakira's Fijación Oral, Vol. 1 (2005) and Maná's Amar es Combatir (2006), both at number four, and his album YHLQMDLG (2020) at number two. In its second week, the album dropped to number two on the chart, earning an additional 57,000 units. It was the 4th Best Selling Latin Album of 2020 in the United States with 348,000 units. It was the Best Selling Latin Album in the United States of 2021 with 854,000 units. As of January 2023, El Último Tour del Mundo had sold 1.7 million equivalent units in the United States.

El Ultimo Tour del Mundo was the most streamed album on Spotify in Argentina, Chile, Mexico, and Colombia.

In Spain, it was the third most streamed album of 2021.

=== Commentary ===
In an article for Billboard, Leila Cobo considered the number-one position "a huge win" for the Latin music industry, that "for decades has seen its artists systematically undermined by the mainstream media, and by the industry overall, unless they either sing in English or collaborate with a mainstream act who does." Among the factors that made that possible, she cited Bad Bunny being "arguably one of the most popular artists globally", the era of streaming, the Latin music genre's sustained growth both in the US and globally, and that he was not "subjected" to the barriers to entry that Latin artists "have had to crash into for years" in the US, as they did not enjoy the same distribution, radio airplay, media coverage or presence, award show nominations or appearances as mainstream acts, "even when their global music sales merited it." She also deemed him "a unique artist with a unique appeal that's not easily replicated." Ben Sisario of The New York Times also cited streaming as "key" for his success.

== Track listing ==
El Último Tour del Mundo track listing
No.	Title	Writer(s)	Producer(s)	Length
1.	"El Mundo Es Mío"	Benito Martínez; Mauricio Quijada; Roberto Rosado; Kamil Assad	Maux	2:45
2.	"Te Mudaste"	Martínez; Gabriel Mora; Hector Lopez; Marco Borrero; Luis Gonzalez	Caleb Calloway; Mag; Mr. NaisGai; Mora	2:10
3.	"Hoy Cobré"	Martínez; Jose Cruz; Freddy Montalvo; Kaled Rivera	Súbelo Neo; Elikai; La Paciencia^{[a]}; Hazen^{[a]}; Maux^{[a]}	2:42
4.	"Maldita Pobreza"	Martínez; Borrero; Martin Coogan	Mag	3:33
5.	"La Noche de Anoche" (with Rosalía)	Martínez; Rosalía Vila; Marco Masís; Carlos Ortiz; Juan Rivera; José Ortiz	Tainy; Chris Jedi; Gaby Music	3:23
6.	"Te Deseo Lo Mejor"	Martínez; Borrero; Coogan	Mag	2:19
7.	"Yo Visto Así"	Martínez; Borrero; Coogan	Mag	3:11
8.	"Haciendo Que Me Amas"	Martínez; Borrero; Coogan	Mag	3:37
9.	"Booker T"	Martínez; Borrero; Noah Assad	Mag	2:36
10.	"La Droga"	Martínez; Borrero; Misael de la Cruz	Mag; De la Cruz	2:42
11.	"Dákiti" (with Jhay Cortez)	Martínez; Jesús Nieves; Masís; Mora; Nydia Laner; Egbert Rosa	Tainy; La Paciencia; Cortez^{[b]}; Bad Bunny^{[b]}	3:25
12.	"Trellas"	Martínez; Borrero; Coogan	Mag	2:37
13.	"Sorry Papi" (with Abra)	Martínez; Gabrielle Mirville; Masís	Tainy	2:43
14.	"120"	Martínez; Masís	Tainy; Foreign Teck; Bass Charity	2:31
15.	"Antes Que Se Acabe"	Martínez; Lopez; C. Ortiz Rivera; Nino Segarra; J. Rivera; Borrero; Manuel Lara-Colmenares; Felix Lara-Colmenares; J. Ortiz Rivera	Caleb Calloway; Chris Jedi; Gaby Music; Mag; Lara Project; Nino	3:41
16.	"Cantares de Navidad" (performed by Trio Vegabajeño)	Benito de Jesús; Fernandito Alvarez; Pepito Maduro	Trío Vegabajeño	3:19
Total length:				47:14

=== Additional notes ===
- ^{^[a]} signifies an uncredited co-producer.
- ^{^[b]} signifies additional beats.

== Personnel ==
=== Vocalists ===
- Bad Bunny – main artist
- Rosalía – vocals (5)
- Jhay Cortez – vocals (11)
- Abra – vocals (13)
- Trio Vegabajeño – vocals (16)

=== Musicians ===
- Scotty Dittrich – guitar (10)
- Felix Lara-Colmenares – guitar (15)
- Manuel Lara-Colmenares – guitar (15)
- Benito de Jesús – guitar (16)
- Fernandito Alvarez – guitar (16)
- Pepito Maduro – guitar (16)

=== Technical ===
- Colin Leonard – mastering
- Josh Gudwin – mixing

== Charts ==
=== Weekly charts ===
2020 weekly chart performance for El Último Tour Del Mundo
Chart (2020)	Peak position
Belgian Albums (Ultratop Flanders)	77
Belgian Albums (Ultratop Wallonia)	74
Canadian Albums (Billboard)	23
Dutch Albums (Album Top 100)	58
French Albums (SNEP)	123
Italian Albums (FIMI)	23
Spanish Albums (PROMUSICAE)	1
Swiss Albums (Schweizer Hitparade)	25
US Billboard 200	1
US Independent Albums (Billboard)	1
US Latin Rhythm Albums (Billboard)	1
US Top Latin Albums (Billboard)	1

2025–2026 weekly chart performance for El Último Tour Del Mundo
Chart (2025–2026)	Peak position
Portuguese Streaming Albums (AFP)	174

=== Year-end charts ===
Year-end chart performance for El Último Tour Del Mundo
Chart (2020)	Position
Spanish Albums (PROMUSICAE)	28
Chart (2021)	Position
Italian Albums (FIMI)	96
Spanish Albums (PROMUSICAE)	9
US Billboard 200	17
US Top Latin Albums (Billboard)	1
Chart (2022)	Position
Spanish Albums (PROMUSICAE)	12
US Billboard 200	69
US Top Latin Albums (Billboard)	3
Chart (2023)	Position
Spanish Albums (PROMUSICAE)	33

== Certifications ==
Region	Certification	Certified units/sales
Italy (FIMI)	Platinum	50,000^{‡}
Spain (Promusicae)	2× Platinum	80,000^{‡}
United States (RIAA)	6× Platinum (Latin)	360,000^{‡}
^{‡} Sales+streaming figures based on certification alone.

== See also ==
- 2020 in Latin music
- List of number-one Billboard Latin Albums from the 2020s
- List of number-one Billboard Latin Rhythm Albums of 2021
