= Te Deseo Lo Mejor =

2021 animated Simpsons short film

- Promotional poster
- Directed by: David Silverman
- Written by: Song by: Bad Bunny; Marco Borrero; Martin Coogan; Script by: Al Jean; Joel H. Cohen; Ryan Koh; Christine Nangle
- Based on: The Simpsons by Matt Groening
- Starring: Bad Bunny; Humberto Vélez; Claudia Motta
- Production companies: 20th Television Animation; Gracie Films
- Distributed by: Disney Platform Distribution; YouTube
- Release date: December 24, 2021
- Running time: 2:56
- Country: United States
- Language: Latin American Spanish

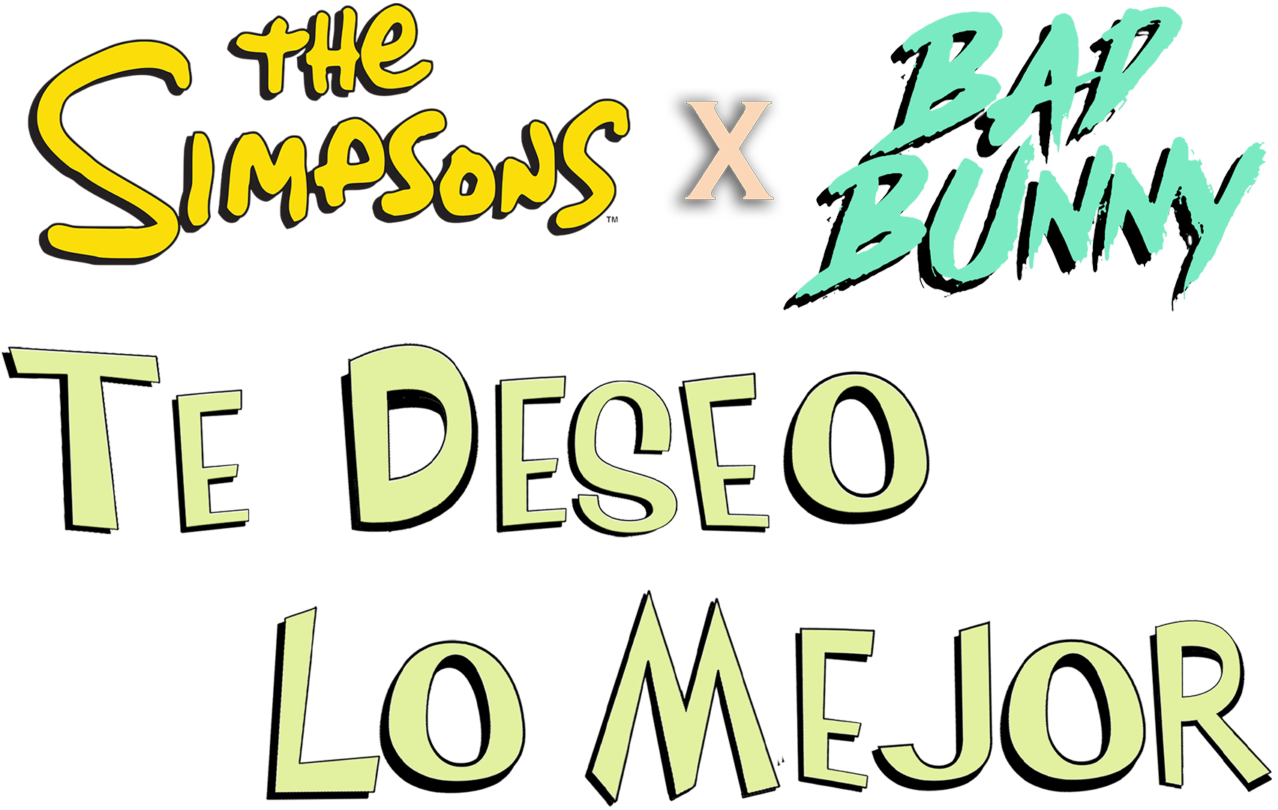
Logo of the film

Te Deseo Lo Mejor (transl. I Wish You the Best; stylized in all caps; IPA: [ˈte deˈse.o lo̞ meˈxoɾ]), also known as The Simpsons, Bad Bunny – Te Deseo Lo Mejor, is a 2021 animated short film and music video based on the animated television series The Simpsons. The film features a song of the same name by Puerto Rican rapper and singer Bad Bunny from 2020 studio album El Último Tour Del Mundo. The film was directed by the show's supervising director David Silverman and stars the show's regular Latin American Spanish cast of Humberto Vélez as Homero Simpson, Claudia Motta as Marge Simpson and Bad Bunny as himself.

The video was not officially announced in advance, it was only hinted at by Bad Bunny the day before the release. The short premiered on December 24, 2021, on Bad Bunny's YouTube channel, where it has over 110 million views. On December 31, 2021, it was added to Star+ including English subtitles (except for the lyrics of the song itself, which remained unsubtitled).

== Plot ==
The family is waiting for Homer to start dinner. When he enters the house very late, Marge complains about the dinner being cold and him not alerting them of it. He says he was not on the phone, before grabbing it and hitting likes on it. Marge asks him what he is liking and he answers other families' dinners, and she warns him that one day he will look up from the phone and he will see they are gone.

He keeps doing it, while Marge hangs her head in defeat, till the phone dies while he is on the couch, watching Bad Bunny sing "Te Deseo Lo Mejor". Homer gets up from the couch, as Bad Bunny starts singing as a ghost next to him, and goes around the house, seeing Marge left leaving messages for him, saying she took the beer, left the bed empty, then at work he finds the donuts and lunch boxes empty, with Marge saying he can prepare lunch for himself.

He starts eating the message before heading to Moe's for a beer, seeing Bad Bunny singing at the Love Tester. After going out, he starts going back seeing the Hibbert family, a dog family and a couple's graves at the cemetery. Right after, he sees Marge's hair behind a wall, but its Raphael selling cotton candy. Next, he exits from the bush to find Patty and Selma that shake their heads at him.

He then goes to the Kwik-E-Kart, where thanks to Nelson passing behind him, he spills the Squishee on the pavement, forming Marge's hair with it. At the Jebediah Springfield statue, Springfielders and Bunny collect money for him and he uses them to eat dinner alone. He then sees that at the Aztec Theater Bunny is on concert that night.

The public grabs him and takes him forward till he is sitting next to Marge, he tries to apologize and ask her to do it for the kids, who are right there next to her, and he pulls out the phone to do a selfie, with them frowning at him. Bunny grabs both and get them on the stage, where he pulls out flower from under the shirt and invites him to ask for forgiveness. She agrees in the end after he gets his phone out and gives it to Bunny to crush it under his foot. Back at home, they stay together on the couch and Bunny returns in the television. In the end they kiss while on TV Bunny winks before switching the TV off.

== Cast ==
- Humberto Vélez as Homero Simpson
- Claudia Motta as Marge Simpson
- Bad Bunny as himself

== Production ==
The short is in Latin American Spanish and has the Latin American dub voice actors Humberto Vélez and Claudia Motta voicing Homer and Marge respectively. The short was also directed by David Silverman. It was written by Joel H. Cohen, Ryan Koh, Christine Nangle, and Al Jean.

== Prediction of Bad Bunny's phone incident ==
The Simpsons is known for its "predictions", among other things. A video went viral on the internet in which Bad Bunny took the mobile phone of a fan who wanted to take a selfie with him and threw it into the water. In Te Deseo Lo Mejor, Bad Bunny destroys Homer's cell phone.

== Reception ==
Rich Knight of CinemaBlend ranked Te Deseo Lo Mejor fifth of seven in their top of The Simpsons Disney+ shorts, stating "There's nothing special about the plot. But, there are some pretty funny gags in this one, like Homer walking through the hedges backward, which became a famous gif, and Bad Bunny (who is now also a pretty good wrestler), stomping on Homer's phone so that Homer and Marge reconcile. It's much funnier than it had to be, all things considered."
