= Grammy Award for Best Música Urbana Album =

Music award category

Grammy Award for Música Urbana Album
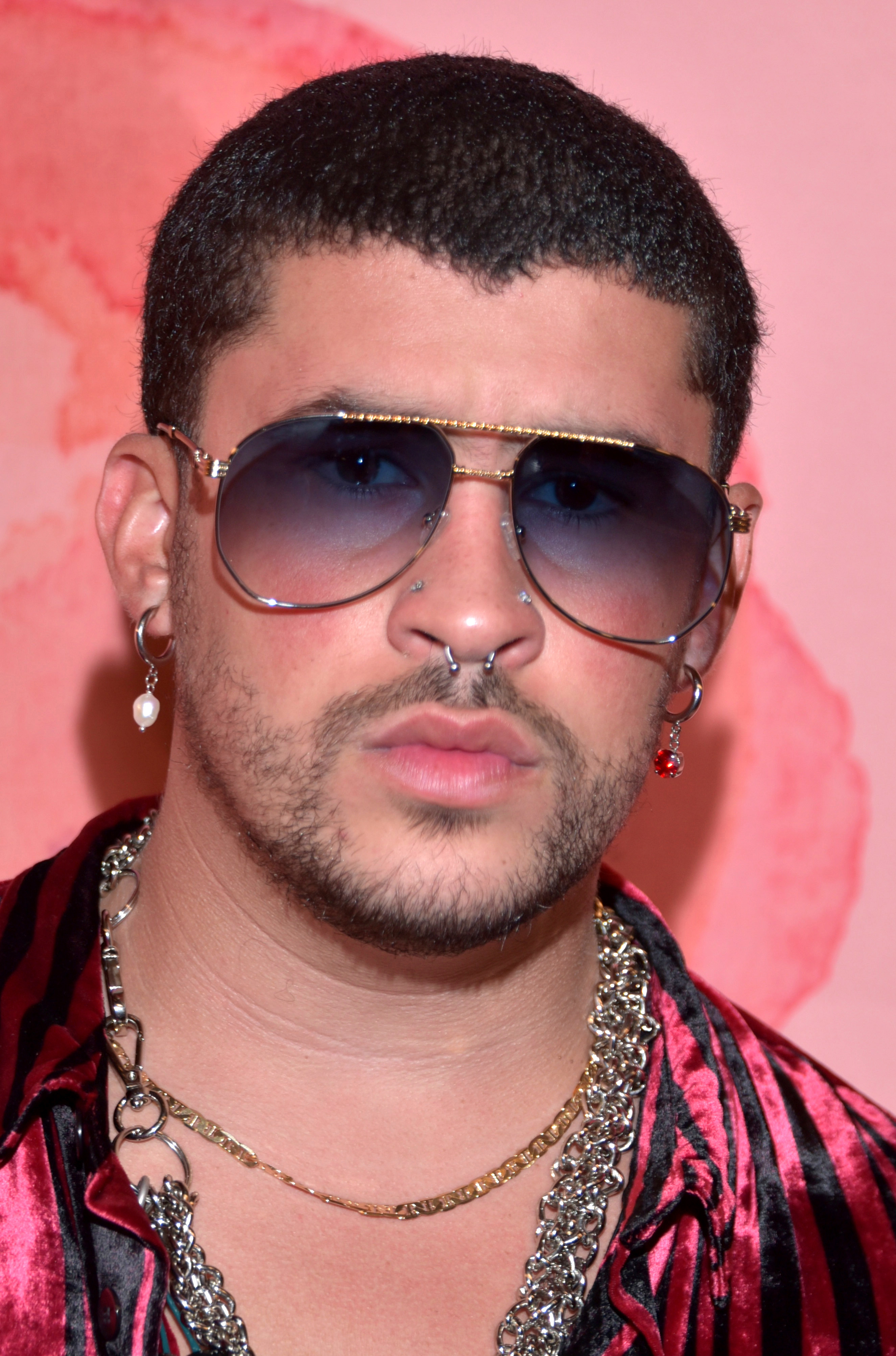
- The 2026 recipient was Debí Tirar Más Fotos by Bad Bunny
- Awarded for: quality vocal or instrumental urbano music albums
- Country: United States
- Presented by: The Recording Academy
- First award: 2022
- Currently held by: Debí Tirar Más Fotos – Bad Bunny (2026)

Highlights
- Most wins: Bad Bunny (3)
- Most nominations: Bad Bunny (4)
- Website: grammy.com

The Grammy Award for Best Música Urbana Album is an honor presented to recording artists for quality vocal or instrumental urbano music albums at the Grammy Awards, a ceremony that was established in 1958 and originally called the Gramophone Awards. Honors in several categories are presented at the ceremony annually by the Recording Academy of the United States to "honor artistic achievement, technical proficiency and overall excellence in the recording industry, without regard to album sales or chart position". Bad Bunny was the inaugural winner of this category thanks to his 2020 album El Último Tour Del Mundo.

== History ==
The award for Best Música Urbana Album, reserved for Latin performers exhibiting "Latin urban styles", was first presented at the 64th Annual Grammy Awards in April 2022. The award category is an addition to the Latin Music field, which also includes Best Regional Mexican Music Album (including Tejano), Best Latin Rock or Alternative Album, Best Tropical Latin Album, and Best Latin Pop Album.

== Recipients ==
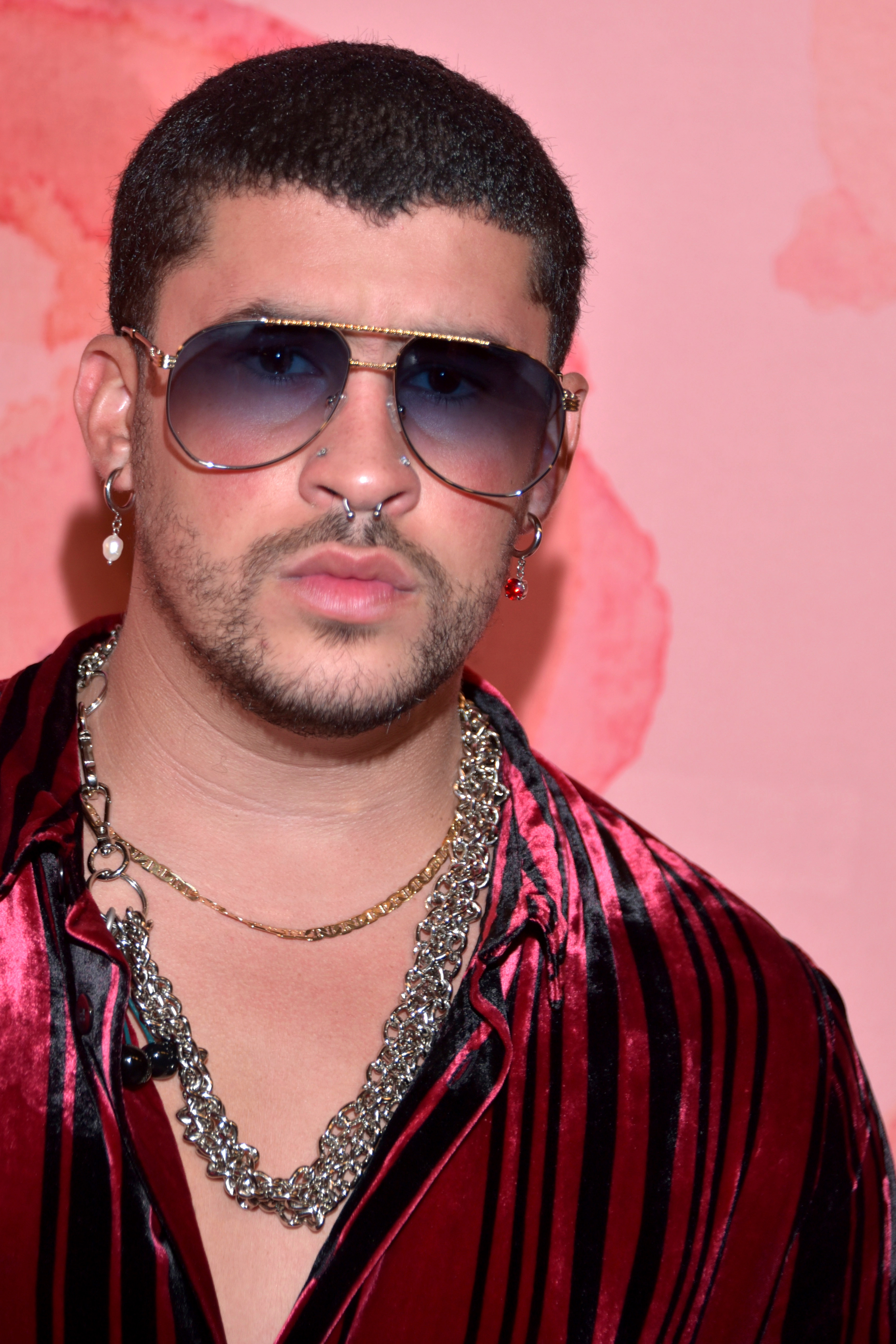
Inaugural winner Bad Bunny, who won consecutively in 2022 and 2023. In 2026, he won this award and Album of the Year for Debi Tirar Mas Fotos, the first ever Spanish-Language album to win the award.

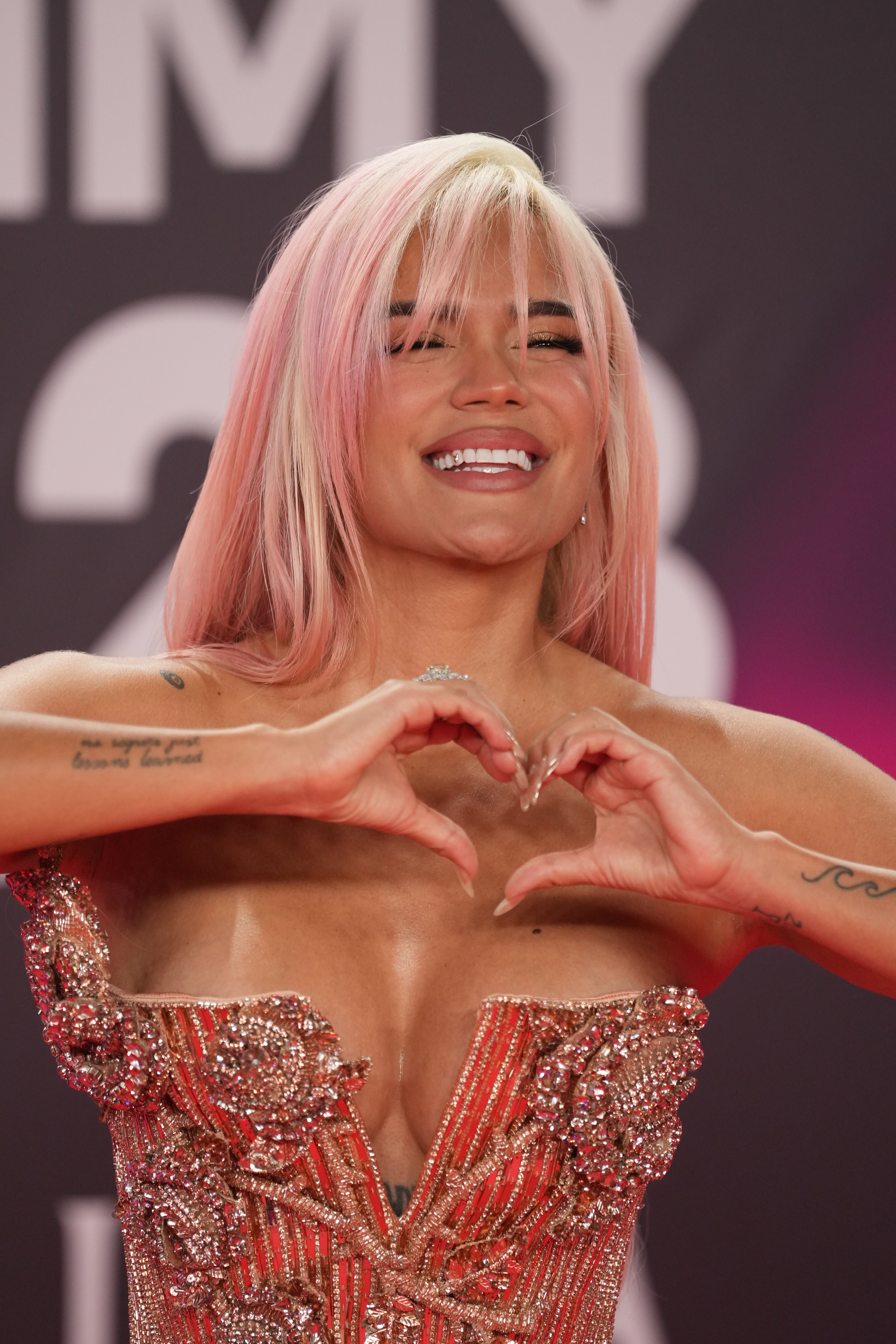
Karol G became the first woman to win the award in 2024.

=== 2020s ===
Year	Work	Artist
2022
2022	El Último Tour Del Mundo	Bad Bunny
2022	Afrodisíaco	Rauw Alejandro
2022	Jose	J Balvin
2022	KG0516	Karol G
2022	Sin Miedo (del Amor y Otros Demonios)	Kali Uchis
2023
2023	Un Verano Sin Ti	Bad Bunny
2023	La 167	Farruko
2023	Legendaddy	Daddy Yankee
2023	The Love & Sex Tape	Maluma
2023	Trap Cake, Vol. 2	Rauw Alejandro
2024
2024	Mañana Será Bonito	Karol G
2024	Data	Tainy
2024	Saturno	Rauw Alejandro
2025
2025	Las Letras Ya No Importan	Residente
2025	Att.	Young Miko
2025	Ferxxocalipsis	Feid
2025	Nadie Sabe Lo Que Va a Pasar Mañana	Bad Bunny
2025	Rayo	J Balvin
2026
2026	Debí Tirar Más Fotos	Bad Bunny
2026	EUB Deluxe	Trueno
2026	Ferxxo Vol X: Sagrado	Feid
2026	Mixteip	J Balvin
2026	Naiki	Nicki Nicole
2026	Sinfónico — En Vivo	Yandel
2027
2027	Cosa Nuestra: Capítulo 0	Rauw Alejandro
2027	Do Not Disturb: Late Checkout	Young Miko
2027	El Green Print: La Saga (Disc 1) – Feid vs Ferxxo	Feid
2027	Hopi Sendé	Ryan Castro
2027	Omakase	Álvaro Diaz
2027	Omerta	J Balvin and Ryan Castro

== Artists with multiple wins ==
3 wins

- Bad Bunny (2 consecutive)

== Artists with multiple nominations ==
4 nominations

- Rauw Alejandro
- Bad Bunny

3 nominations

- J Balvin
- Feid

2 nominations

- Ryan Castro
- Karol G
- Young Miko

== See also ==
- Grammy Award for Best Latin Pop Album
- Grammy Award for Best Latin Rock or Alternative Album
- Grammy Award for Best Tropical Latin Album
