= Yo Visto Así =

2020 single by Bad Bunny

Single by Bad Bunny

from the album El Último Tour Del Mundo
- Language: Spanish
- Released: November 27, 2020
- Genre: Rap rock, electronic rock
- Length: 3:12
- Label: Rimas
- Songwriters: Benito Martínez; Marco Borrero; Martin Coogan
- Producer: MAG

Bad Bunny singles chronology
| "Dakiti" (2020) | "Yo Visto Así" (2020) | "Booker T" (2021) |

Music video
- "Yo Visto Así" on YouTube

"Yo Visto Así" (English: "I Dress Like This") is a song by Puerto Rican rapper Bad Bunny. It was released on November 27, 2020 through Rimas Entertainment as the second single from Bad Bunny's third solo studio album, El Último Tour Del Mundo.

== Music video ==
Directed by Bad Bunny and Stillz, the music video for "Yo Visto Así" premiered on November 27, 2020 along with the release of Bad Bunny's third solo studio album, El Último Tour Del Mundo. The video opens with a shot of the truck shown on the cover of El Último Tour Del Mundo and continues to move on into Bad Bunny in a skatepark with graffiti of what represents his second solo studio album YHLQMDLG (2020). The video proceeds to a photoshoot scene featuring cameos of many celebrities including Ricky Martin, Ruby Rose, Luka Sabbat, Sofia Vergara, Ryan Garcia, Sech, Karol G, Francisco Lindor, Bad Bunny’s brother, and more. The video closes with shots of Bad Bunny in an empty stadium.

== Charts ==
| Chart (2020) | Peak position |
|---|---|
| Argentina Hot 100 (Billboard) | 74 |
| Global 200 (Billboard) | 25 |
| Spain (PROMUSICAE) | 4 |
| US Billboard Hot 100 | 64 |
| US Hot Latin Songs (Billboard) | 5 |

== Certifications ==
| Region | Certification | Certified units/sales |
|---|---|---|
| Spain (Promusicae) | Platinum | 60,000^{‡} |
^{‡} Sales+streaming figures based on certification alone.
