= Booker T (song) =

2021 single by Bad Bunny

Single by Bad Bunny

from the album El Último Tour Del Mundo
- Released: January 2, 2021
- Genre: Latin trap
- Length: 2:37
- Label: Rimas
- Songwriter: Benito Martinez
- Producer: MAG

Bad Bunny singles chronology
| "Yo Visto Así" (2020) | "Booker T" (2021) | "La Noche de Anoche" (2021) |

Music video
- "Booker T" on YouTube

"Booker T" is a song by Puerto Rican rapper and singer Bad Bunny. It was released on January 2, 2021 by Rimas Entertainment, as the third single from his third solo studio album El Último Tour Del Mundo. It won Best Rap/Hip Hop Song at the 22nd Annual Latin Grammy Awards. The instrumental is also used as Bad Bunny's entrance music in WWE.

== Composition ==
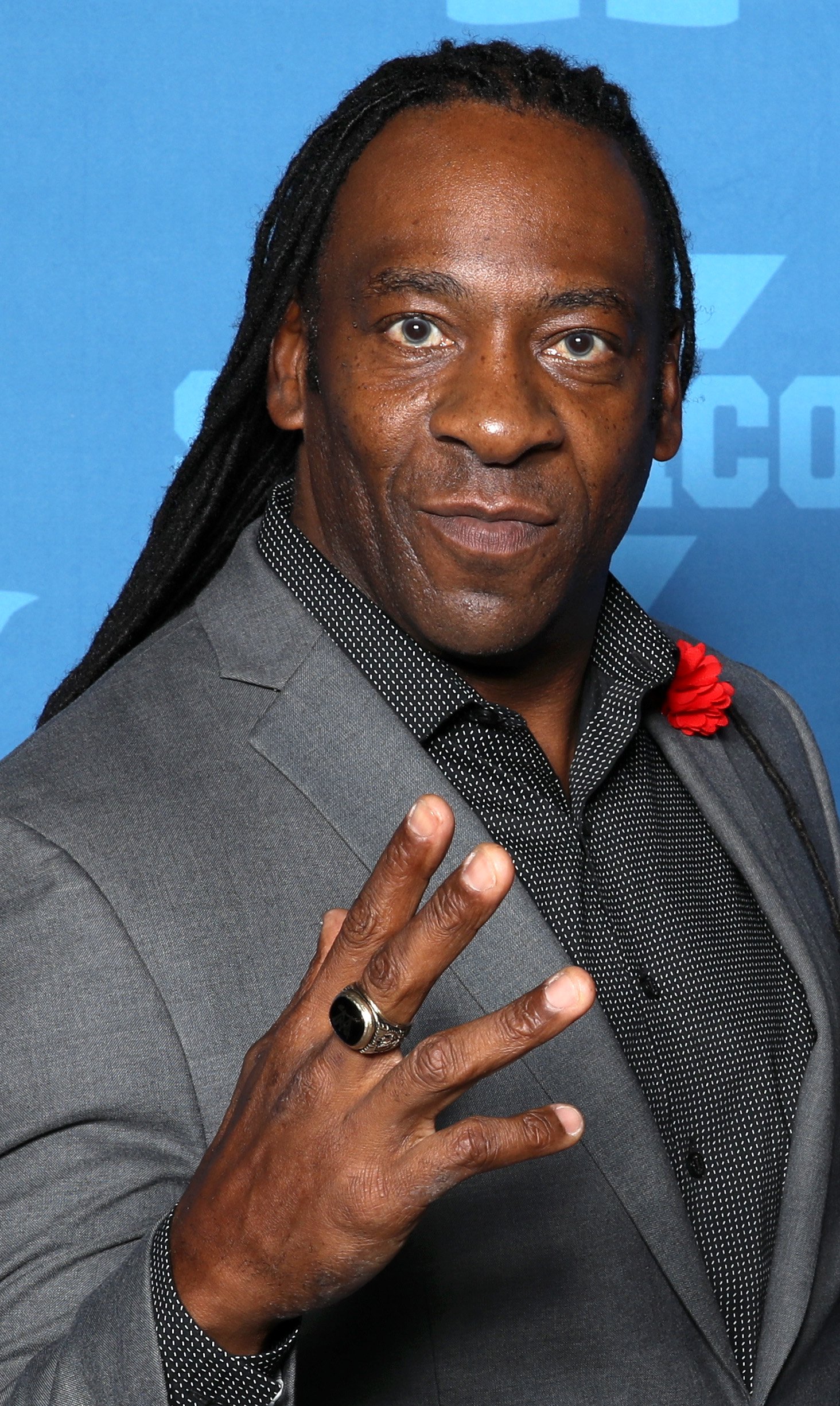
The song is named after wrestler Booker T (pictured), who appears in the video.

According to Esquire, "Booker T" is a song about "personal vindication", with Bad Bunny discussing his commercial success, criticism, award shows, and other artists' promotional trends. Remezcla also interprets that, in the song, the rapper feels proud of his achievements "without having to promote his songs".

== Music video ==
The music video was directed by Stillz and released on January 2, 2021. It shows Bad Bunny and WWE wrestler Booker T inside a trailer, referencing the album cover. Bad Bunny appears wearing a t-shirt that reads "2032", year from a dystopian future he imagined where takes place the tour that inspired his compositions during confinement. The wrestler starts the video standing unamused by the rapper, later following his rhythm as he performs the song. It has more than 237 million views on YouTube.

== Live performances ==
The song had its first performance during the WWE's Royal Rumble in January 2021. Wrestler Booker T also appeared on that performance, imitating the music video.

== Charts ==
=== Weekly charts ===
| Chart (2020) | Peak position |
|---|---|
| Global 200 (Billboard) | 45 |
| Nicaragua (Monitor Latino) | 8 |
| Spain (Promusicae) | 13 |
| US Billboard Hot 100 | 78 |
| US Hot Latin Songs (Billboard) | 8 |

=== Year-end charts ===
| Chart (2021) | Position |
|---|---|
| US Hot Latin Songs (Billboard) | 32 |

== Certifications ==
| Region | Certification | Certified units/sales |
|---|---|---|
| Spain (Promusicae) | Platinum | 60,000^{‡} |
^{‡} Sales+streaming figures based on certification alone.
