= 2023 Billboard Latin Music Awards =

Latin music awards ceremony

30th Billboard Latin Music Awards
- Date: October 5, 2023
- Site: Watsco Center, Coral Gables, Florida, United States
- Hosted by: Jacqueline Bracamontes, Danilo Carrera

Highlights
- Most awards: Peso Pluma (8)
- Most nominations: Peso Pluma (21)

Television coverage
- Network: Telemundo, Universo, Peacock
- Ratings: 2.6 million

The 30th Billboard Latin Music Awards presented by Billboard to honor the most popular albums, songs and performers in Latin music were held at the Watsco Center in Coral Gables, Florida on October 5, 2023.

The ceremony was broadcast on Telemundo, Universo and streaming service Peacock.

For the first time in the awards ceremony were added four categories: the Global 200 Latin Artist of the Year and the Global 200 Latin Song of the Year, to celebrate Latin artists and their songs that have achieved success on the Billboard Global 200, and the Streaming Song of the Year and Sales Song of the Year.

Puerto Rican singer-songwriter Ivy Queen received the Icon Award at the ceremony, while Mexican group Los Angeles Azules was honored with the Lifetime Achievement Award. Karol G was the recipient of the Spirit of Hope award.

== Presenters ==
- Christopher von Uckermann, Maite Perroni and Christian Chávez presented Sales Song of the Year.
- Giselle Blondet and Myrka Dellanos presented Hot Latin Song of the Year.
- Jacqueline Bracamontes introduced Calibre 50.
- Jacqueline Bracamontes introduced Tini.
- Daniel Arenas, La Materialista and Elena Rose presented Top Latin Album of the Year.
- Danilo Carrera introduced Grupo Frontera.
- Christian de la Campa and Samadhi presented Global 200 Latin Song of the Year.
- Jacqueline Bracamontes introduced Myke Towers and Yandel.
- Kimberly Dos Ramos and Joaquín Cortés presented Global 200 Latin Artist of the Year.
- Jessica Carrillo and Lourdes Stephen introduced Los Ángeles Azules, Nicki Nicole, Ximena Sariñana and Sofía Reyes and presented the Lifetime Achievement Award to Los Ángeles Azules.
- Ana Jurka, Rey Misterio and Marla Solís presented New Artist of the Year.
- Jacqueline Bracamontes and Danilo Carrera introduced Pepe Aguilar and Marc Anthony.
- Verónica Bastos, Peter Nieto and De la Ghetto presented Duo/Group Hot Latin Songs Artist of the Year.
- Danilo Carrera introduced Marshmello and Manuel Turizo.
- Yandel presented the Icon Award to Ivy Queen.
- Jacqueline Bracamontes introduced Peso Pluma and Nicki Nicole.
- Eslabon Armado and DannyLux presented Latin Rhythm Artist of the Year, Duo or Group.
- Jacqueline Bracamontes and Danilo Carrera introduced Olga Tañón.
- Jacqueline Bracamontes and Danilo Carrera introduced Bad Bunny.
- Alex Sensation, Penélope Menchaca and Beéle presented Airplay Song of the Year.
- Jacqueline Bracamontes introduced Yng Lvcas and Peso Pluma.
- Paris Hilton and Danilo Carrera presented the Spirit of Hope Award to Karol G.
- Jacqueline Bracamontes introduced Chiquis, Calibre 50 and Los Sebastianes.
- Danilo Carrera introduced Sky Rompiendo, Feid and Myke Towers.
- Danilo Carrera introduced Eladio Carrión.
- Julia Gama and Nadia Ferreira presented Artist of the Year.
- Jacqueline Bracamontes and Danilo Carrero introduced Farruko, La Factoría and Eddy Lover.

== Performers ==
List of performers at the 30th Billboard Latin Music Awards
| Artist(s) | Song(s) |
|---|---|
| Justin Quiles El Alfa | "Fiesta Loca" |
| Calibre 50 | "Borracho Pero Buen Muchacho" |
| Tini | "Cupido" |
| Grupo Frontera | "El Amor de Su Vida" |
| Myke Towers Yandel | "Lala" "Borracho Y Loco" |
| Los Ángeles Azules Nicki Nicole Ximena Sariñana Sofía Reyes | "Otra Noche" "Mis Sentimientos" "Nunca Es Suficiente" "Cómo Te Voy a Olvidar" |
| Marc Anthony Pepe Aguilar | "Ojalá Te Duela" |
| Manuel Turizo Marshmello | "El Merengue" |
| Peso Pluma Nicki Nicole | "Por Las Noches (Remix)" |
| Olga Tañon | "Es Mentiroso" (Remix) |
| Bad Bunny | "Moscow Mule" "Tití Me Preguntó" "Neverita" "Me Porto Bonito" "Where She Goes" "Un Preview" |
| Yng Lvcas Peso Pluma | "La Bebé (Remix)" |
| Chiquis Calibre 50 Banda Los Sebastianes | Tribute to Jenni Rivera "Basta Ya" "Inolvidable" "Ya Lo Sé" |
| Sky Rompiendo Feid Myke Towers | "El Cielo" |
| Eladio Carrión | "Mbappé" |
| La Factoría Eddy Lover Farruko | "Perdóname" |

== Winners and nominees ==
The nominations were announced on August 24, 2023, with Mexican singer Peso Pluma leading with 21, followed by Bad Bunny and Grupo Frontera with 15 each, Karol G, with 13, Shakira and Fuerza Regida with 12 each.

Winners appear first and highlighted in bold.

| Artist of the Year | New Artist of the Year |
|---|---|
| **Bad Bunny**; Fuerza Regida; Grupo Frontera; Karol G; Peso Pluma | **Peso Pluma**; Bizarrap; Chino Pacas; Grupo Frontera; Yng Lvcas |
| Tour of the Year | Crossover Artist of the Year |
| **Bad Bunny**; Daddy Yankee; Grupo Firme; Karol G; Rauw Alejandro | **Marshmello**; Justin Timberlake; Lil Jon; Maître Gims; Sean Paul |
| Global 200 Latin Artist of the Year | Global 200 Latin Song of the Year |
| **Bad Bunny**; Feid; Karol G; Peso Pluma; Grupo Frontera | **Manuel Turizo – La Bachata**; Bad Bunny – Tití Me Preguntó; Bizarrap feat. Quevedo – Bzrp Music Sessions, Vol. 52; Eslabon Armado feat. Peso Pluma – Ella Baila Sola; Yng Lvcas feat. Peso Pluma – La Bebe (Remix) |
| Hot Latin Song of the Year | Hot Latin Song of the Year, Vocal Event |
| **Eslabon Armado feat. Peso Pluma – Ella Baila Sola**; Fuerza Regida feat. Grupo Frontera – Bebe Dame; Grupo Frontera feat. Bad Bunny – Un x100to; Karol G feat. Shakira – TQG; Yng Lvcas feat. Peso Pluma – La Bebe (Remix) | **Eslabon Armado feat. Peso Pluma – Ella Baila Sola**; Fuerza Regida feat. Grupo Frontera – Bebe Dame; Grupo Frontera feat. Bad Bunny – Un x100to; Karol G feat. Shakira – TQG; Yng Lvcas feat. Peso Pluma – La Bebe (Remix) |
| Hot Latin Songs Artist of the Year, Male | Hot Latin Songs Artist of the Year, Female |
| **Peso Pluma**; Bad Bunny; Feid; Junior H; Natanael Cano | **Karol G**; Becky G; Rosalía; Shakira; Young Miko |
| Duo/Group Hot Latin Songs Artist of the Year | Hot Latin Songs Label of the Year |
| **Grupo Frontera**; Eslabon Armado; Fuerza Regida; Grupo Marca Registrada; Yahritza y Su Esencia | **Sony Music Latin**; DEL; Rimas; Universal Music Latin Entertainment; Warner Latina |
| Sales Song of the Year | Streaming Song of the Year |
| **Bad Bunny – Tití Me Preguntó**; Bizarrap feat. Shakira – Bzrp Music Sessions, Vol. 53; Eslabon Armado feat. Peso Pluma – Ella Baila Sola; Fuerza Regida feat. Grupo Frontera – Bebe Dame; Karol G feat. Shakira – TQG | **Eslabon Armado feat. Peso Pluma – Ella Baila Sola**; Fuerza Regida feat. Grupo Frontera – Bebe Dame; Grupo Frontera feat. Bad Bunny – Un x100to; Peso Pluma feat. Natanael Cano – PRC; Yng Lvcas feat. Peso Pluma – La Bebe (Remix) |
| Airplay Song of the Year | Airplay Label of the Year |
| **Manuel Turizo – La Bachata**; Bizarrap feat. Shakira – Bzrp Music Sessions, Vol. 53; Shakira feat. Ozuna – Monotonía; Yandel feat. Feid – Yandel 150; Karol G feat. Shakira – TQG | **Sony Music Latin**; Lizos; Rimas; Universal Music Latin Entertainment; Warner Latina |
| Top Latin Album of the Year | Top Latin Albums Artist of the Year, Duo/Group |
| **Karol G – Mañana Será Bonito**; Fuerza Regida – Pa Que Hablen: I.; Ivan Cornejo – Dañado; Peso Pluma – Génesis; Rauw Alejandro – Saturno | **Fuerza Regida**; Aventura; Eslabon Armado; Grupo Marca Registrada; Maná |
| Top Latin Albums Artist of the Year, Male | Top Latin Albums Artist of the Year, Female |
| **Bad Bunny**; Ivan Cornejo; Ozuna; Rauw Alejandro; Romeo Santos | **Karol G**; Becky G; Kali Uchis; Rosalía; Yuridia |
Top Latin Albums Label of the Year
**Rimas**; DEL; Sony Music Latin; Universal Music Latin Entertainment; Warner Latina
| Latin Pop Artist of the Year | Latin Pop Duo/Group of the Year |
| **Shakira**; Becky G; Enrique Iglesias; Rosalía; Sebastián Yatra | **Maná**; Camila; Enanitos Verdes; Piso 21; Reik |
| Latin Pop Song of the Year | Latin Pop Album of the Year |
| **Bizarrap feat. Shakira – Bzrp Music Sessions, Vol. 53**; Karol G feat. Shakira – TQG; Maluma – Junio; Rosalía feat. Rauw Alejandro – Beso; Sebastián Yatra – Una Noche Sin Pensa | **Camilo – De Adentro Pa Afuera**; Morat – Si Ayer Fuera Hoy; Piso 21 – 777; Selena – Moonchild Mixes; Tini – Cupido |
| Latin Pop Airplay Label of the Year | Latin Pop Albums Label of the Year |
| **Sony Music Latin**; Dale Play; Universal Music Latin Entertainment; Warner Latina; WK | **Universal Music Latin Entertainment**; Columbia; RCA; Sony Music Latin; Warner Latina |
| Tropical Artist of the Year, Solo | Tropical Artist of the Year, Duo or Group |
| **Romeo Santos**; Prince Royce; Luis Figueroa; Elvis Crespo; Marc Anthony | **Aventura**; Gente de Zona; La Sonora Dinamita; Los Ángeles Azules; Monchy & Alexandra |
Tropical Song of the Year
**Manuel Turizo – La Bachata**; Marshmello feat. Manuel Turizo – El Merengue; Rosalía – Despechá; Romeo Santos feat. Rosalía – El Pañuelo; Shakira feat. Ozuna – Monotonía
| Tropical Songs Airplay Label of the Year | Tropical Albums Label of the Year |
| **Sony Music Latin**; Columbia; Rimas; Universal Music Latin Entertainment; WK | **Sony Music Latin**; Discos Fuentes; The Orchard; Universal Music Latin Entertainment; Universal Music Enterprises |
| Regional Mexican Artist of the Year, Solo | Regional Mexican Artist of the Year, Duo or Group |
| **Peso Pluma**; Carin León; Ivan Cornejo; Junior H; Natanael Cano | **Fuerza Regida**; Eslabon Armado; Calibre 50; Grupo Frontera; La Maquinaria Norteña |
| Regional Mexican Song of the Year | Regional Mexican Album of the Year |
| **Eslabon Armado feat. Peso Pluma – Ella Baila Sola**; Carin León feat. Grupo Frontera – Que Vuelvas; Fuerza Regida feat. Grupo Frontera – Bebe Dame; Grupo Frontera feat. Bad Bunny – Un x100to; Peso Pluma feat. Natanael Cano – PRC | **Ivan Cornejo – Dañado**; Eslabon Armado – Desvelado; Fuerza Regida – Pa Que Hablen: I.; Fuerza Regida – Sigan Hablando: II.; Peso Pluma – Génesis |
| Regional Mexican Airplay Label of the Year | Regional Mexican Albums Label of the Year |
| **Universal Music Latin Entertainment**; Afinarte; Remex; Lizos; Sony Music Latin | **Del**; Manzana; Rancho Humilde; Sony Music Latin; Universal Music Latin Entertainment |
| Latin Rhythm Artist of the Year, Solo | Latin Rhythm Artist of the Year, Duo or Group |
| **Bad Bunny**; Daddy Yankee; Feid; Karol G; Rauw Alejandro | **Wisin & Yandel**; Cartel de Santa; Mambo Kingz; The Rudeboyz; Zion & Lennox |
| Latin Rhythm Song of the Year | Latin Rhythm Album of the Year |
| **Bad Bunny – Tití Me Preguntó**; Bad Bunny feat. Rauw Alejandro – Party; Bizarrap feat. Quevedo – Bzrp Music Sessions, Vol. 52; Yandel feat. Feid – Yandel 150; Yng Lvcas feat. Peso Pluma – La Bebe (Remix) | **Karol G – Mañana Será Bonito**; Anuel AA – LLNM2; Eladio Carrión – 3MEN2 KBRN; Feid – Feliz Cumpleaños Ferxxo Te Pirateamos el Álbum; Rauw Alejandro – Saturno |
| Latin Rhythm Airplay Label of the Year | Latin Rhythm Albums Label of the Year |
| **Sony Music Latin**; Republic; Rimas; Universal Music Latin Entertainment; Warner Latina | **Rimas**; Interscope Geffen A&M; Real Hasta la Muerte; Sony Music Latin; Universal Music Latin Entertainment |
| Songwriter of the Year | Producer of the Year |
| **Peso Pluma**; Bad Bunny; Edgar Barrera; MAG; Pedro Tovar | **Edgar Barrera**; Ernesto Fernández; Jimmy Humilde; MAG; Ovy On The Drums |
| Publisher of the Year | Publishing Corporation of the Year |
| **Prajin Music Publishing, BMI**; 11ONCE Music, BMI; Double P Publishing, BMI; Sony Latin Music Publishing, LLC, BMI; Street Mob Publishing, BMI | **Sony Music Publishing**; BMG; Kobalt Music; Universal Music; Warner Chappell Music |
Icon Award
Ivy Queen
Lifetime Achievement Award
Los Ángeles Azules
Spirit of Hope
Karol G
