= Tu Veneno Mortal, Vol. 2 =

2021 studio album by Eslabón Armado

Studio album by Eslabón Armado
- Released: June 25, 2021
- Genre: Regional Mexican
- Length: 36:59
- Label: DEL Records
- Producer: Pedro Tovar

Eslabón Armado chronology
Corta Venas (2020)	Tu Veneno Mortal, Vol. 2 (2021)	Nostalgia (2022)

Tu Veneno Mortal, Vol. 2 (transl. Your Deadly Poison, Vol. 2) is the fourth studio album by American regional Mexican group Eslabón Armado. It was released on June 25, 2021, through DEL Records as a self-produced effort. It is the first album by the group since guitarist Gabriel Hidalgo's departure in 2020. It debuted at number 132 on the US Billboard 200 with 8,000 album-equivalent units and also became their fourth consecutive album to peak at No. 1 on the US Regional Mexican Albums charts.

== Background and writing ==
Following the release of Eslabon Armado's third studio album Corta Venas (2020), which became one of their best-performing albums, lead vocalist Pedro Tovar suffered from a writer's block, attaining no inspiration in writing and thought about hiring other songwriters. After asking his manager, Ángel del Villar, for help, he rented a resort in Los Angeles for Tovar to "relax and feel inspired". While in his travel, he eventually felt inspired in writing again. In 2021, it was announced that guitarist Gabriel Hidalgo had left the group after the remaining members, brothers Pedro and Brian Tovar, were relocating.

== Release and reception ==
Tu Veneno Mortal, Vol. 2 was released on June 25, 2021, through DEL Records. It debuted at number 132 on the US Billboard 200 with 8,000 album-equivalent units. It also debuted at number five on the US Top Latin Albums chart and would become their third album to debut atop the US Regional Mexican Albums chart, and their fourth consecutive album to peak at number one. The group later announced an accompanying tour in support of the album.

== Track listing ==
All tracks are written by Pedro Tovar.

Tu Veneno Mortal, Vol. 2 track listing
No.	Title	Length
1.	"Daddy's Intro"	0:19
2.	"No Dudes de Ti"	3:09
3.	"Regresa Mami"	3:35
4.	"La Vibra Pegó"	3:59
5.	"Un Gallito"	3:13
6.	"Tonto Perdedor"	3:23
7.	"Una Peda"	2:56
8.	"Loco Enamorado"	3:48
9.	"La Diabla"	3:27
10.	"Dime Si Me Quieres"	3:20
11.	"Mírate en el Espejo"	3:16
12.	"Cuando Tú Me Miras"	2:35
Total length:		36:59

== Charts ==
=== Weekly charts ===
Weekly chart performance for Tu Veneno Mortal, Vol. 2
Chart (2021)	Peak position
US Billboard 200	132
US Independent Albums (Billboard)	17
US Regional Mexican Albums (Billboard)	1
US Top Latin Albums (Billboard)	5

=== Year-end charts ===
Year-end chart performance for Tu Veneno Mortal, Vol. 2
Chart (2021)	Position
US Regional Mexican Albums (Billboard)	17
US Top Latin Albums (Billboard)	53

== Certifications ==
Certifications for Tu Veneno Mortal, Vol. 2
Region	Certification	Certified units/sales
United States (RIAA)	3× Platinum (Latin)	180,000^{‡}
^{‡} Sales+streaming figures based on certification alone.

== See also ==
- 2021 in Latin music
- List of Billboard Regional Mexican Albums number ones of 2021
