= Latin American Music Awards of 2024 =

Annual awards ceremony

9th Annual Latin American Music Awards
- Date: April 25, 2024
- Location: MGM Grand Arena (Las Vegas, Nevada)
- Country: United States
- Hosted by: Thalía; Alejandra Espinoza; Becky G Carlos Ponce

Highlights
- Most awards: Feid; Karol G (6 each)
- Most nominations: Feid; Peso Pluma (12 each)

Television/radio coverage
- Network: Univision; UniMás; Galavisión; Canal 5

The 9th Annual Latin American Music Awards were held on April 25, 2024, to recognize outstanding achievements for artists in the Latin music industry of 2023, voted by the public.

The ceremony was take place at the MGM Grand Arena in Las Vegas, United States, and was broadcast simultaneously on Univision, UniMás and Galavisión in the United States, and Canal 5 in México. It was hosted by Mexican singer and actress Thalía, Mexican presenter Alejandra Espinoza, American singer and actress Becky G and Puerto Rican actor and musician Carlos Ponce.

The nominations were announced on March 19, 2024, with both Colombian singer Feid and Mexican singer Peso Pluma leading the nominations with twelve, followed by Bad Bunny and Grupo Frontera with eleven each.

== Performers ==
| Artist(s) | Song(s) |
|---|---|
| Thalía & Deorro | "Te Va A Doler" |
| Jay Wheeler & Zhamira Zambrano | "Extrañándote" |
| Justin Quiles, Lenny Tavárez, Sech, Dalex & Dímelo Flow | "La Ranger" / "Quítenme el Teléfono" |
| Ryan Castro | "El Cantante del Ghetto" / "Quema" |
| Farruko & Ky-Mani Marley | "Confía" / "Rasta Reggae (Jamming)" |
| Gabito Ballesteros | "Lou Lou" / "El Boss" |
| Marc Anthony | "Alé Alé" |
| Carín León | "Cuando La Vida Sea Trago" |
| Wisin & Mora | "Bien Loco" |
| Yng Lvcas | "Jimmy Choo" |
| Yandel | "Caserío" / "Te Suelto El Pelo" / "Permítame" (with Jay Wheeler) / "Encantadora" (with Farruko) / "Yandel 150" (with Feid) |
| Chino Pacas | "Tunechi" / "El Gordo Trae Al Mando" |
| Anitta | "Double Team" with Brray / "Sábana" |
| Becky G & Oscar Maydon | "Mercedes" |
| Morat | "Faltas Tú" |
| Ricardo Montaner, Manuel Medrano, Thalía, Silvestre Dangond & DJ Adoni | "Yo Que Te Amé" / "La Cima Del Cielo" / "Vamos Pa' La Conga" |
| Jennifer Nettles & Noel Schajris | "Love's Still Here" |
| Peso Pluma & Arcángel | "Peso Completo" |
| Danny Ocean | "Cero condiciones" |
| Feid & Yandel | "Fecha" / "Brickell" |
| Banda MS, A.B. Quintanilla, Carín León & Los 2 de la S | "Tu Perfume" / "Somos Lo Que Somos" / "Ojos Cerrados" / "Es Viernes" |
| Nacho, Venesti & Milo Beat | "No Es Normal" |

== Winners and nominees ==
The nominations were announced on March 19, 2024. The winners are listed in bold.

| Artist of the Year | New Artist of the Year |
|---|---|
| **Karol G**; Bad Bunny; Carín León; Eslabon Armado; Feid; Fuerza Regida; Peso Pluma; Rauw Alejandro; Romeo Santos; Shakira | **Young Miko**; Bad Gyal; Chino Pacas; Gabito Ballesteros; Majo Aguilar; Peso Pluma; Venesti; Xavi; Yng Lvcas; Zhamira Zambrano |
| Song of the Year | Album of the Year |
| **"TQG" – Karol G & Shakira**; "Bailando Bachata" – Chayanne; "El Merengue" – Marshmello & Manuel Turizo; "Ella Baila Sola" – Eslabon Armado & Peso Pluma; "Lala" – Myke Towers; "Según Quién" – Maluma & Carín León; "Shakira: Bzrp Music Sessions, Vol. 53" – Bizarrap & Shakira; "Solo Conmigo" – Romeo Santos; "Un x100to" – Grupo Frontera & Bad Bunny; "Yandel 150" - Yandel & Feid | **Mañana Será Bonito – Karol G**; 3men2 Kbrn – Eladio Carrión; Colmillo de Leche – Carín León; Desvelado – Eslabon Armado; El Comienzo – Grupo Frontera; Feliz Cumpleaños Ferxxo Te Pirateamos el Álbum – Feid; Génesis – Peso Pluma; Nadie Sabe Lo Que Va a Pasar Mañana – Bad Bunny; Pa Que Hablen – Fuerza Regida; Playa Saturno – Rauw Alejandro |
| Collaboration of the Year | Collaboration Crossover of the Year |
| **"Yandel 150" – Yandel & Feid**; "La Bebé" (Remix) – Yng Lvcas & Peso Pluma; "Según Quién" – Maluma & Carín León; "Shakira: Bzrp Music Sessions, Vol. 53" – Bizarrap & Shakira; "Un x100to" – Grupo Frontera & Bad Bunny | **"Niña Bonita" – Feid & Sean Paul**; "Dientes" – J Balvin, Usher & DJ Khaled; "El Merengue" – Marshmello & Manuel Turizo; "Ojalá" – The Rudeboyz, Maluma & Adam Levine; "Vocation" – Ozuna & David Guetta |
| Best Crossover Artist | Streaming Artist of the Year |
| **Marshmello**; Adam Levine; David Guetta; DJ Khaled; Drake; Rema; Sean Paul; Usher | **Feid**; Bad Bunny; Eslabon Armado; Fuerza Regida; Grupo Frontera; Junior H; Karol G; Peso Pluma; Rauw Alejandro; Young Miko |
| Tour of the Year | Global Latin Artist of the Year |
| **Soy Rebelde Tour – RBD**; Doble P Tour 2023 – Peso Pluma; Fórmula, Vol. 3: La Gira – Romeo Santos; Luis Miguel Tour 2023–24 – Luis Miguel; Mañana Será Bonito Tour – Karol G | **Karol G**; Bad Bunny; Feid; Fuerza Regida; Grupo Frontera; Junior H; Maluma; Peso Pluma; Quevedo; Shakira |
| Global Latin Song of the Year | Favorite Duo or Group – Pop |
| **"Classy 101" – Feid & Young Miko**; "Ella Baila Sola" – Eslabon Armado & Peso Pluma; "Lala" – Myke Towers; "Shakira: Bzrp Music Sessions, Vol. 53" – Bizarrap & Shakira; "Un x100to" – Grupo Frontera & Bad Bunny | **RBD**; Camila; Morat; Piso 21; Reik |
| Favorite Pop Artist | Favorite Pop Album |
| **Shakira**; Bizarrap; Enrique Iglesias; Manuel Turizo; Sebastián Yatra | **Orquídeas – Kali Uchis**; Bailemos Otra Vez – Chayanne; Cupido – Tini |
| Favorite Pop Song | Favorite Urban Artist |
| **"Acróstico" – Shakira**; "Beso" – Rosalía & Rauw Alejandro; "Fugitivos" – Camila; "Pasa_je_ro" – Farruko; "Una Noche Sin Pensar" – Sebastián Yatra | **Karol G**; Bad Bunny; Feid; Rauw Alejandro; Young Miko |
| Favorite Urban Album | Favorite Urban Song |
| **Mañana Será Bonito – Karol G**; Data – Tainy; LPM (La Perreo Mixtape) – Yng Lvcas; Nadie Sabe Lo Que Va a Pasar Mañana – Bad Bunny; Playa Saturno – Rauw Alejandro | **"Yandel 150" – Yandel & Feid**; "Lala" – Myke Towers; "TQG" – Karol G & Shakira; "Un Cigarrillo" – Chencho Corleone; "Where She Goes" – Bad Bunny |
| Best Collaboration - Urban | Favorite Regional Mexican Artist |
| **"Classy 101" – Feid & Young Miko**; "Arranca" – Becky G & Omega; "Borracho y Loco" – Yandel & Myke Towers; "Hey Mor" – Ozuna & Feid; "Me Porto Bonito" – Bad Bunny & Chencho Corleone | **Carín León**; Gabito Ballesteros; Iván Cornejo; Junior H; Peso Pluma |
| Favorite Regional Mexican Duo or Group | Favorite Regional Mexican Album |
| **Grupo Frontera**; Calibre 50; Eslabon Armado; Fuerza Regida; Los Ángeles Azules | **Génesis – Peso Pluma**; Desvelado – Eslabon Armado; Colmillo de Leche – Carín León; El Comienzo – Grupo Frontera; Pa Las Baby's y Belikeada – Fuerza Regida |
| Favorite Regional Mexican Song | Best Collaboration - Regional Mexican |
| **"TQM" – Fuerza Regida**; "Di Que Sí" – Grupo Marca Registrada & Grupo Frontera; "Difícil Tu Caso" – Alejandro Fernández; "Dirección Equivocada" – Calibre 50; "Indispensable" – Carín León | **"Ella Baila Sola" – Eslabon Armado & Peso Pluma**; "Bebe Dame – Fuerza Regida & Grupo Frontera; "El Amor de Su Vida" – Grupo Frontera & Grupo Firme; "Pa' Olvidarme De Tus Besos" – Lenin Ramírez & Banda MS; "Qué Agonía" – Yuridia & Ángela Aguilar |
| Favorite Tropical Artist | Favorite Tropical Song |
| **Romeo Santos**; Carlos Vives; Luis Figueroa; Marc Anthony; Prince Royce | **"Solo Conmigo" – Romeo Santos**; "Bailando Bachata" – Chayanne; "Bandido" – Luis Figueroa; "La Falta Que Me Haces" – Natti Natasha; "Me EnRD" – Prince Royce |
| Best Collaboration - Tropical | |
**"El Merengue" – Marshmello & Manuel Turizo**; "Ambulancia" – Camilo & Camila Cabello; "Asi es la Vida" – Enrique Iglesias & María Becerra; "La Fórmula" – Maluma & Marc Anthony; "Si Tú Me Quieres" – Fonseca & Juan Luis Guerra

== Special Honor ==
- Legacy Award: Banda MS
- Legacy Award: Ricardo Montaner
- Pioneer Award: Yandel

== Records ==
=== Multiple nominations ===
| Nominations | Act |
|---|---|
| 12 | Feid |
| 12 | Peso Pluma |
| 11 | Bad Bunny |
| 11 | Grupo Frontera |
| 9 | Karol G |
| 9 | Shakira |
| 8 | Eslabon Armado |
| 8 | Fuerza Regida |
| 7 | Carín León |
| 6 | Rauw Alejandro |
| 5 | Maluma |
| 5 | Romeo Santos |
| 5 | Young Miko |
| 4 | Bizarrap |
| 4 | Manuel Turizo |
| 4 | Marshmello |
| 4 | Myke Towers |
| 4 | Yandel |
| 3 | Chayanne |
| 3 | Junior H |
| 3 | Yng Lvcas |
| 2 | Adam Levine |
| 2 | Calibre 50 |
| 2 | Camila |
| 2 | Chencho Corleone |
| 2 | David Guetta |
| 2 | DJ Khaled |
| 2 | Enrique Iglesias |
| 2 | Gabito Ballesteros |
| 2 | Luis Figueroa |
| 2 | Marc Anthony |
| 2 | Ozuna |
| 2 | Prince Royce |
| 2 | RBD |
| 2 | Sean Paul |

=== Most awards ===
| Awards | Artist |
|---|---|
| 6 | Feid |
| 6 | Karol G |
| 3 | Shakira |
| 3 | Young Miko |
| 2 | Marshmello |
| 2 | Peso Pluma |
| 2 | RBD |
| 2 | Romeo Santos |
| 2 | Yandel |
| 1 | Carín León |
| 1 | Eslabón Armado |
| 1 | Fuerza Regida |
| 1 | Grupo Frontera |
| 1 | Kali Uchis |
| 1 | Manuel Turizo |
| 1 | Sean Paul |
