= DLUX =

2023 studio album by DannyLux

Studio album by DannyLux
- Released: August 18, 2023
- Length: 57:35; 80:25 (EVOLUXION)
- Language: Spanish
- Label: VPS Music; Warner Music Latina

DannyLux chronology
Perdido En Ti (2022)	DLUX (2023)	Leyenda (2025)

Singles from DLUX
- 1. "Te Fallé" Released: March 24, 2023; 2. "Te Extraño y Lo Siento..." Released: April 21, 2023; 3. "Zafiro" Released: June 30, 2023

Singles from EVOLUXION
- 1. "Un Día Entenderás" Released: January 12, 2024; 2. "Ciudad del Sol" Released: February 9, 2024

DLUX is the third studio album by singer-songwriter DannyLux. It was released by Warner Music Latina on August 18, 2023, and contains 17 tracks with guest appearances from Gabito Ballesteros, Pablo Hurtado, Eslabon Armado, Yami Safdie, Jordyn Shellhart, Melvin War, Cuco, and Maye. A deluxe version of the album titled EVOLUXION was released on March 1, 2024, with six new tracks including a guest appearance from Alejandro Buelna.

== Background and release ==
The first single of the album, "Te Fallé", was released on March 24, 2023. The second single, "Te Extraño y Lo Siento..." was released on April 21. The final prerelease single, "Zafiro" featuring Pablo Hurtado was released on June 30. DLUX was released on August 18, 2023, with the artist already working on the deluxe version of the album.

On January 12, 2024, DannyLux released the first single off the deluxe version, titled "Un Día Entenderás". On February 9, DannyLux released the second single, "Ciudad del Sol". On March 1, the deluxe version, titled EVOLUXION, was released.

== Promotion ==
=== DLUX ===
On the day of release, DannyLux held a free concert to celebrate the new album in downtown Los Angeles. On September 27, the singer performed three songs from the album, "Amar y Perder", "Te Extraño y Lo Siento...", and "Atrapado", for his Tiny Desk Concert with NPR. DannyLux announced his Ambición Tour starting in Atlanta, Georgia on November 11.

=== EVOLUXION ===
On the same day EVOLUXION was released, DannyLux announced the dates of his 2024 tour, 2024 Tour of Lux. The tour began March 8, 2024, and planned to stop in 36 cities throughout the United States and Mexico.

== Reception ==
=== Accolades ===
Album	Publication	Accolade	Rank	Ref.
DLUX	Rolling Stone	The 50 Best Spanish-Language Albums of 2023	30	
DLUX	Billboard	The 25 Best Latin Albums of 2023: Staff Picks	—N/a	

== Awards and nominations ==
Album	Award	Year	Category	Result	Ref.
Evoluxion	Latin Grammy Awards	2024	Best Contemporary Mexican Music Album	Nominated	

== Track listing ==
Credits adapted from Spotify.

Track listing for DLUX
No.	Title	Lyrics	Producer(s)	Length
1.	"Atrapado"	Daniel Balderrama Espinoza	Balderrama Espinoza	3:03
2.	"Dime Que Hay Que Hacer" (with Gabito Ballesteros)	Gabito Ballesteros	Andres Farias; Balderrama Espinoza; Ballesteros	2:58
3.	"Amar y Perder"	Balderrama Espinoza	Balderrama Espinoza	5:19
4.	"Ambición"	Nolan Lambroza; Balderrama Espinoza; Elise Yuka	Balderrama Espinoza; Yuka; Sir Nolan	3:29
5.	"Zafiro" (featuring Pablo Hurtado)	Balderrama Espinoza; Hector Crisantes; Pablo Hurtado	Balderrama Espinoza; Crisantes	3:53
6.	"Me Cambiaste" (with Eslabon Armado)	Balderrama Espinoza	Balderrama Espinoza	3:45
7.	"Ferxxo 100"	Alejando Ramirez; Andres David Restrepo Echavarría; Esteban Higuita Estrada; Johan Esteban Espinosa Cuervo; Julien A. Graux Sebastien; Salomón Villada Hoyos	Balderrama Espinoza	3:24
8.	"Alguien Más" (with Yami Safdie)	Balderrama Espinoza; Héctor Mena; Jose Portilla; Yami Safdie	Mena; Portilla	2:21
9.	"Te Fallé"	Balderrama Espinoza	Balderrama Espinoza; Juan Diaz Rei	3:17
10.	"La Lluvia" (with Jordyn Shellhart)	Aureo Baquiero; Cameron Jaymes; Balderrama Espinoza; Jordyn Shellhart	Jaymes; Balderrama Espinoza	3:33
11.	"Te Extraño y Lo Siento..."	Balderrama Espinoza	Balderrama Espinoza	3:49
12.	"¿Cómo te lo Explico?"	Balderrama Espinoza; Crisantes	Crisantes; Balderrama Espinoza	3:01
13.	"Creo Q Dios" (with Melvin War)	Balderrama Espinoza; Melvin Guerra	Balderrama Espinoza; Guerra	2:58
14.	"Decir Adios 'Oye Narrador'" (with Cuco)	Balderrama Espinoza; Fernando Carbajal; Manuel Lara; Omar Banos; Shawn Everett	Balderrama Espinoza	3:48
15.	"Mi Hogar" (with Maye)	Balderrama Espinoza; Ehren Joseph Fear; Joel Rodrigues; Maye Osorio; Guerra; Roy Lenzo	Balderrama Espinoza	2:55
16.	"Amigos"	Balderrama Espinoza; Lenno Linjama	Balderrama Espinoza; Lenno	3:34
17.	"House of Lux"	Balderrama Espinoza; Juan Diaz	Balderrama Espinoza; Juan Carlos Diaz	2:20
Total length:				57:35

Track listing for EVOLUXION
No.	Title	Lyrics	Producer(s)	Length
1.	"Maldito Alcohol"	Daniel Balderrama Espinoza	Balderrama Espinoza; David Moises Segura	4:02
2.	"Atrapado"	Balderrama Espinoza	Balderrama Espinoza	3:03
3.	"Dime Que Hay Que Hacer" (with Gabito Ballesteros)	Gabito Ballesteros	Andres Farias; Balderrama Espinoza; Ballesteros	2:58
4.	"Ciudad Del Sol"	Balderrama Espinoza; Edward Bracamonte; Victor Hugo Ramos Jr.	Balderrama Espinoza; Segura	3:44
5.	"Amar y Perder"	Balderrama Espinoza	Balderrama Espinoza	5:19
6.	"Fracaso" (with Alejandro Buelna)	Balderrama Espinoza	Balderrama Espinoza	3:24
7.	"Ambición"	Nolan Lambroza; Balderrama Espinoza; Elise Yuka	Balderrama Espinoza; Yuka; Sir Nolan	3:29
8.	"Zafiro" (featuring Pablo Hurtado)	Balderrama Espinoza; Hector Crisantes; Pablo Hurtado	Balderrama Espinoza; Crisantes	3:53
9.	"Ya Van Varios Dias"	Balderrama Espinoza	Balderrama Espinoza	3:00
10.	"Me Cambiaste" (with Eslabon Armado)	Balderrama Espinoza	Balderrama Espinoza	3:45
11.	"Un Día Entenderás"	Balderrama Espinoza	Balderrama Espinoza; Segura	3:26
12.	"Ferxxo 100"	Alejando Ramirez; Andres David Restrepo Echavarría; Esteban Higuita Estrada; Johan Esteban Espinosa Cuervo; Julien A. Graux Sebastien; Salomón Villada Hoyos	Balderrama Espinoza	3:24
13.	"Alguien Más" (with Yami Safdie)	Balderrama Espinoza; Héctor Mena; Jose Portilla; Yami Safdie	Mena; Portilla	2:21
14.	"Te Fallé"	Balderrama Espinoza	Balderrama Espinoza; Juan Diaz Rei	3:17
15.	"La Lluvia" (with Jordyn Shellhart)	Aureo Baquiero; Cameron Jaymes; Balderrama Espinoza; Jordyn Shellhart	Jaymes; Balderrama Espinoza	3:33
16.	"Control"	Balderrama Espinoza	Balderrama Espinoza	2:57
17.	"Te Extraño y Lo Siento..."	Balderrama Espinoza	Balderrama Espinoza	3:49
18.	"¿Cómo te lo Explico?"	Balderrama Espinoza; Crisantes	Crisantes; Balderrama Espinoza	3:01
19.	"Creo Q Dios" (with Melvin War)	Balderrama Espinoza; Melvin Guerra	Balderrama Espinoza; Guerra	2:58
20.	"Decir Adios 'Oye Narrador'" (with Cuco)	Balderrama Espinoza; Fernando Carbajal; Manuel Lara; Omar Banos; Shawn Everett	Balderrama Espinoza	3:48
21.	"Mi Hogar" (with Maye)	Balderrama Espinoza; Ehren Joseph Fear; Joel Rodrigues; Maye Osorio; Guerra; Roy Lenzo	Balderrama Espinoza	2:55
22.	"Amigos"	Balderrama Espinoza; Lenno Linjama	Balderrama Espinoza; Lenno	3:34
23.	"House of Lux"	Balderrama Espinoza; Juan Diaz	Balderrama Espinoza; Juan Carlos Diaz	2:20
24.	"House of Lux 2"	Balderrama Espinoza	Balderrama Espinoza; Segura	2:25
Total length:				80:25

=== Notes ===
- All tracks are stylised in all caps.

== Certifications ==
Certifications for DLUX
Region	Certification	Certified units/sales
United States (RIAA)	Gold (Latin)	30,000^{‡}
^{‡} Sales+streaming figures based on certification alone.

Certifications for EVOLUXION
Region	Certification	Certified units/sales
United States (RIAA)	Gold (Latin)	30,000^{‡}
^{‡} Sales+streaming figures based on certification alone.

== Release history ==
Release history for DLUX
Region	Date	Format	Label
Various	August 18, 2023	LP; digital download; streaming	VPS Music; Warner Music Latina

Release history for EVOLUXION
Region	Date	Format	Label
Various	March 1, 2024	digital download; streaming	VPS Music; Warner Music Latina
