= Amor Perdido (album) =

2024 studio album by Eslabón Armado

Studio album by Eslabón Armado
- Released: October 4, 2024
- Genre: Regional Mexican
- Length: 41:35
- Language: Spanish
- Label: DEL Records
- Producers: Pedro Tovar; Pablo Molina

Eslabón Armado chronology
Desvelado (2023)	Amor Perdido (2024)

Singles from Amor Perdido
- 1. "La Fresa" Released: October 6, 2023

Amor Perdido (transl. Lost Love) is the seventh studio album by American regional Mexican band Eslabón Armado. It was released on October 4, 2024, through DEL Records. The album was set for release in early 2024, but was withholded by DEL Records who prevented it from releasing, which would have ended their contract with the label. It was supported by its lead single "La Fresa", with the album including guest appearances from Erre and Gabito Ballesteros.

== Background and release ==
After releasing their sixth studio album, Desvelado (2023), which was supported by the lead and hit single "Ella Baila Sola", Eslabon Armado released the single "La Fresa" with Gabito Ballesteros, on October 6, 2023, with both artists performing it on The Tonight Show Starring Jimmy Fallon. In 2024, the group were set to release an album, but was withholded by the DEL Records label who were preventing it from being released, with lead vocalist Pedro Tovar's mother, Nelida Oseguera, stating the group had already finished the album and that releasing it would end their contract with the label. On July 26, 2024, the group performed at the Kia Forum in Los Angeles, where they revealed the album's cover art and title, which was revealed as Amor Perdido.

== Track listing ==
All tracks are written by Pedro Tovar, except where noted.

Amor Perdido track listing
No.	Title	Writer(s)	Producer(s)	Length
1.	"Faldita"		Pablo Molina; Pedro Tovar	2:58
2.	"Tu Me Encantas"		Molina; Tovar	3:48
3.	"Loco Loco"		Molina; Tovar	3:14
4.	"El Mundo Es Tuyo"		Molina; Tovar	3:46
5.	"Me Gust Todo de Ti"	Horacio Palencia	Molina; Tovar	4:43
6.	"Amarte Así"		Molina; Tovar	4:41
7.	"La Desgraciada"		Molina; Tovar	3:52
8.	"Bandolera" (with Erre)	Eduardo Ernesto Granados Rojas; Tovar	Molina; Tovar	3:48
9.	"Cinco Minutos"	América Angélica Jiménez; Erika María Ender	Molina; Tovar	3:58
10.	"La Fresa" (with Gabito Ballesteros)		Molina; Tovar	2:55
11.	"No Me Dejes Bebé"		Molina; Tovar	3:52
Total length:				41:35
