= Jugaste y Sufrí =

"Jugaste y Sufri"

Single by Eslabón Armado and DannyLux

from the album Corta Venas
- Language: Spanish
- English title: "You Played and I Suffered"
- Released: December 18, 2020
- Genre: Regional Mexican; Latin urban; corrido tumbado; sad sierreño; chicano indie
- Length: 4:35
- Label: DEL Records
- Songwriter: Daniel Balderrama

Eslabon Armado singles chronology
"Jugaste y Sufri" (2020)	"Ella Baila Sola" (2023)

Audio video
- https://youtube.com/E6ecxtNWyVs

"Jugaste y Sufri" (English: "You Played and I Suffered") is a song by regional Mexican group Eslabón Armado featuring American regional Mexican singer DannyLux. The song was originally released on the band's third studio album, Corta Venas by DEL Records on December 18, 2020. "Corta Venas" is Eslabon Armado's last studio album to be recorded as a trio. It became the third regional Mexican song to chart on the US Billboard Hot 100, peaking at number 69 in 2021. It also peaked at number 3 on the Billboard Hot Latin Songs chart.

The collaboration between DannyLux and Eslabón Armado formed after Pedro Tovar took notice of Danny's abilities after he made a cover of one of the band’s songs. Tovar asked Danny to collaborate as a lyricist on the album "Corta Venas". Embracing the opportunity, he accepted and soon went on to record the track.

== Awards and nominations ==
List of awards and nominations received by DannyLux
Award	Year	Recipient(s) and nominee(s)	Category	Result	Ref.
Billboard Latin Music Awards	2022	Jugaste y Sufrí (with Eslabon Armado)	Regional Mexican Song of the Year	Nominated	

== Charts ==
Chart performance for "Jugaste y Sufrí"
Chart (2021)	Peak position
Global 200 (Billboard)	111
US Billboard Hot 100	69
US Hot Latin Songs (Billboard)	3
