= Nostalgia (Eslabón Armado album) =

Studio album by Eslabón Armado
- Released: May 6, 2022
- Genre: Regional Mexican
- Length: 45:03
- Label: DEL Records
- Producer: Edgar Rodriguez; Pedro Tovar

Eslabón Armado chronology
Tu Veneno Mortal, Vol. 2 (2021)	Nostalgia (2022)	Desvelado (2023)

Nostalgia is the fifth studio album by American regional Mexican group Eslabón Armado. It was released on May 6, 2022, through DEL Records. The album contains guest appearances from Junior H, DannyLux, Fuerza Regida, Iván Cornejo, Estevie and Erre. It debuted at number 9 on the Billboard 200 with 44,000 album-equivalent units, becoming the first regional Mexican album to reach the chart's top 10.

This is the second album since the departure of Gabriel Hidalgo, and their first album to feature guitarist Ulises González. Guitarist Damián Pacheco joined the group shortly after the recording was completed. This makes Nostalgia the debut work of both González and Pacheco.

== Commercial performance ==
On the issue dated May 21, 2022, Nostalgia debuted at number 9 on the US Billboard 200 with 29,500 album-equivalent units, which consisted of 42.82 million official streams in the country. On the chart's same issue date, Bad Bunny's Un Verano Sin Ti appeared at number one, marking the first time two Spanish-language albums appeared on the chart's top 10. It also debuted atop the US Regional Mexican Albums chart, while it debuted at number 2 on the US Top Latin Albums chart. It became the first regional Mexican album to debut within the chart's top 10.

== Track listing ==
All tracks are written by Pedro Tovar, except where noted.

Nostalgia track listing
No.	Title	Writer(s)	Length
1.	"Vete a la Fregada"		2:46
2.	"Dos Morritas" (with Junior H)		3:59
3.	"Modo Depre :("		3:20
4.	"Si Supieras" (with DannyLux)	Daniel Balderrama Espinoza; Pedro Tovar	3:48
5.	"Luces Rojas"		3:24
6.	"Mente en Alto"		4:04
7.	"La Perrie" (with Fuerza Regida)		3:26
8.	"Hasta la Muerte" (with Iván Cornejo)		3:30
9.	"Los Que Quieras"		3:36
10.	"Las Historias Se Acaban" (with Estevie)	Sarah Silva; Tovar	3:13
11.	"Maldito Amor!"		2:58
12.	"Solo" (with Erre)	Eduardo Granados Rojas; Tovar	3:33
13.	"Que Diablos Hice (Interlude)"		1:47
14.	"Solo Pa' Decir"		1:39
Total length:			45:03

== Charts ==
=== Weekly charts ===
Weekly chart performance for Nostalgia
Chart (2022)	Peak position
US Billboard 200	9
US Independent Albums (Billboard)	3
US Regional Mexican Albums (Billboard)	1
US Top Latin Albums (Billboard)	2

=== Year-end charts ===
2022 year-end chart performance for Nostalgia
Chart (2022)	Position
US Regional Mexican Albums (Billboard)	3
US Top Latin Albums (Billboard)	23

2023 year-end chart performance for Nostalgia
Chart (2023)	Position
US Regional Mexican Albums (Billboard)	10
US Top Latin Albums (Billboard)	34

== Certifications ==
Certifications for Nostalgia
Region	Certification	Certified units/sales
United States (RIAA)	2× Platinum (Latin)	120,000^{‡}
^{‡} Sales+streaming figures based on certification alone.

== See also ==
- 2022 in Latin music
- List of Billboard Regional Mexican Albums number ones of 2022
