= List of Billboard Regional Mexican Albums number ones of 2022 =

The Regional Mexican Albums, published in Billboard magazine, is a record chart that features Latin music sales information for regional styles of Mexican music. This data are compiled by Nielsen SoundScan from a sample that includes music stores, music departments at department stores, verifiable sales from concert venues and track equivalent album units and streaming equivalent album units in the United States.

== Chart history ==
Issue date	Album	Artist(s)	Ref.
January 1	Historia de un Ídolo, Vol. 1	Vicente Fernández	
January 8	Corta Venas	Eslabon Armado	
January 15	Corta Venas	Eslabon Armado	
January 22	Corta Venas	Eslabon Armado	
January 29	Corta Venas	Eslabon Armado	
February 5	Corta Venas	Eslabon Armado	
February 12	Corta Venas	Eslabon Armado	
February 19	Corta Venas	Eslabon Armado	
February 26	Mi Vida En Un Cigarro 2	Junior H	
March 5	Corta Venas	Eslabon Armado	
March 12	Corta Venas	Eslabon Armado	
March 19	Corta Venas	Eslabon Armado	
March 26	Corta Venas	Eslabon Armado	
April 2	Corta Venas	Eslabon Armado	
April 9	Corta Venas	Eslabon Armado	
April 16	Corta Venas	Eslabon Armado	
April 23	Corta Venas	Eslabon Armado	
April 30	Corta Venas	Eslabon Armado	
May 7	Obsessed	Yahritza y Su Esencia	
May 14	Obsessed	Yahritza y Su Esencia	
May 21	Nostalgia	Eslabon Armado	
May 28	Nostalgia	Eslabon Armado	
June 4	Nostalgia	Eslabon Armado	
June 11	Nostalgia	Eslabon Armado	
June 18	Danado	Ivan Cornejo	
June 25	Nostalgia	Eslabon Armado	
July 2	Nostalgia	Eslabon Armado	
July 9	Danado	Ivan Cornejo	
July 16	Danado	Ivan Cornejo	
July 23	Danado	Ivan Cornejo	
July 30	Danado	Ivan Cornejo	
August 6	Danado	Ivan Cornejo	
August 13	Danado	Ivan Cornejo	
August 20	Danado	Ivan Cornejo	
August 27	Danado	Ivan Cornejo	
September 3	Danado	Ivan Cornejo	
September 10	Danado	Ivan Cornejo	
September 17	Danado	Ivan Cornejo	
September 24	Danado	Ivan Cornejo	
October 1	Danado	Ivan Cornejo	
October 8	Danado	Ivan Cornejo	
October 15	Danado	Ivan Cornejo	
October 22	Danado	Ivan Cornejo	
October 29	Danado	Ivan Cornejo	
November 5	Danado	Ivan Cornejo	
November 12	Danado	Ivan Cornejo	
November 19	Danado	Ivan Cornejo	
November 26	Danado	Ivan Cornejo	
December 3	Danado	Ivan Cornejo	
December 10	Danado	Ivan Cornejo	
December 17	Danado	Ivan Cornejo	
December 24	Danado	Ivan Cornejo	
December 31	Danado	Ivan Cornejo	
