= Corta Venas =

2020 studio album by Eslabón Armado

Studio album by Eslabón Armado
- Released: December 18, 2020
- Genre: Regional Mexican
- Length: 97:51
- Label: DEL Records
- Producers: Pedro Tovar; Edgar Rodriguez

Eslabón Armado chronology
Vibras de Noche (2020)	Corta Venas (2020)	Tu Veneno Mortal, Vol. 2 (2021)

Singles from Corta Venas
- 1. "Jugaste y Sufrí" Released: September 23, 2021

Corta Venas (transl. Cut Veins) is the third studio album by American regional Mexican group Eslabón Armado. It was released on December 18, 2020, through DEL Records. Compromising of 24 total songs, it is the group's longest album to date. The album features a sole guest appearance from fellow American singer-songwriter DannyLux, who appears on "Jugaste y Sufrí". The song peaked at number 69 on the Billboard Hot 100, earning both artists their first entry on the chart. It was the last album to feature guitarist and founding member Gabriel Hidalgo before his departure in 2021.

Corta Venas debuted at number 56 on the Billboard 200, additionally debuting atop the US Regional Mexican Albums chart, earning their third number-one album. It was the best-performing album on the latter chart in 2021 and 2022, appearing at number one on the year-end lists for those years. It later received a Latin octuple-platinum certification by the Recording Industry Association of America (RIAA), for certified sales of 480,000 units in the United States.

== Background and music ==
After earning their second number-one album on the US Regional Mexican Albums chart with their second studio album Vibras de Noche, lead vocalist Pedro Tovar teased that their third studio album would be released soon. Consisting of 24 tracks, Corta Venas features songs about heartbreak, while the title itself can easily refer to wrist slitting. The album's first track, "Eslabón Intro", features conversation between a female and lead vocalist Pedro Tovar. The album also features covers of the songs "Mi Historia Entre Tus Dedos" and "La Mejor de Todas". It is also the first time that the group has collaborated with another artist on an album, with DannyLux appearing on the album's ninth track, "Jugaste y Sufrí".

== Release and reception ==
Professional ratings
Review scores
Source	Rating
AllMusic	3.5/5 stars

Corta Venas was released on December 18, 2021, through DEL Records. The official music video for "Ando Más Que Mal" was released on the same day. On the issue dated January 2, 2021, the album debuted at number 56 on the US Billboard 200 chart, earning 31.6 million official streams in the United States, becoming their second entry on the chart after their second studio album Vibras de Noche peaked at number 18. The music for the collaborative track "Jugaste y Sufrí" was released on September 23, 2021, with the song debuting at number 75 on the Billboard Hot 100, later peaking at number 69. Corta Venas was the best-performing album on the US Regional Mexican Albums chart in 2021 and 2022, with it being the ninth best-performing album on the chart in 2023.

== Track listing ==
All tracks are written by Pedro Tovar, except where noted.

Corta Venas track listing
No.	Title	Writer(s)	Length
1.	"Eslabón Intro"		0:45
2.	"Ando Más Que Mal"		5:07
3.	"El Tiempo Nos Cambio"		4:50
4.	"Mi Historia Entre Tus Dedos"	Gianluca Grignani; Ignacio Ballesteros Díaz; Massimo Luca	6:38
5.	"Recuerda Bien"		4:18
6.	"La Mejor de Todas"	Luciano Luna	3:28
7.	"Ex"		3:42
8.	"Tome y Fume"		3:56
9.	"Jugaste y Sufrí" (with DannyLux)	Daniel Balderrama	4:35
10.	"Me Matas"		3:24
11.	"No Simp"		3:38
12.	"Soy Malo Pa' Ti"		2:33
13.	"¿Dime Porqué?"		5:54
14.	"Soy Tóxico"		3:54
15.	"Buscate Otro"		3:46
16.	"Fui Lejos"		4:32
17.	"Diciembre"		3:43
18.	"Me Siento Perdido"		3:54
19.	"Antisocial"		4:40
20.	"Mariposas"		3:40
21.	"No Hay Amor"		4:55
22.	"Te Marque"		4:50
23.	"Déjate Llevar"		3:33
24.	"San Valentín"		3:36
Total length:			97:51

== Charts ==
=== Weekly charts ===
Weekly chart performance for Corta Venas
Chart (2021)	Peak position
US Billboard 200	56
US Independent Albums (Billboard)	7
US Regional Mexican Albums (Billboard)	1
US Top Latin Albums (Billboard)	2

=== Year-end charts ===
2021 year-end chart performance for Corta Venas
Chart (2021)	Position
US Regional Mexican Albums (Billboard)	1
US Top Latin Albums (Billboard)	13

2022 year-end chart performance for Corta Venas
Chart (2022)	Position
US Regional Mexican Albums (Billboard)	1
US Top Latin Albums (Billboard)	11

2023 year-end chart performance for Corta Venas
Chart (2023)	Position
US Regional Mexican Albums (Billboard)	9
US Top Latin Albums (Billboard)	32

== Certifications ==
Certifications for Corta Venas
Region	Certification	Certified units/sales
United States (RIAA)	8× Platinum (Latin)	480,000^{‡}
^{‡} Sales+streaming figures based on certification alone.
