= DannyLux =

American singer

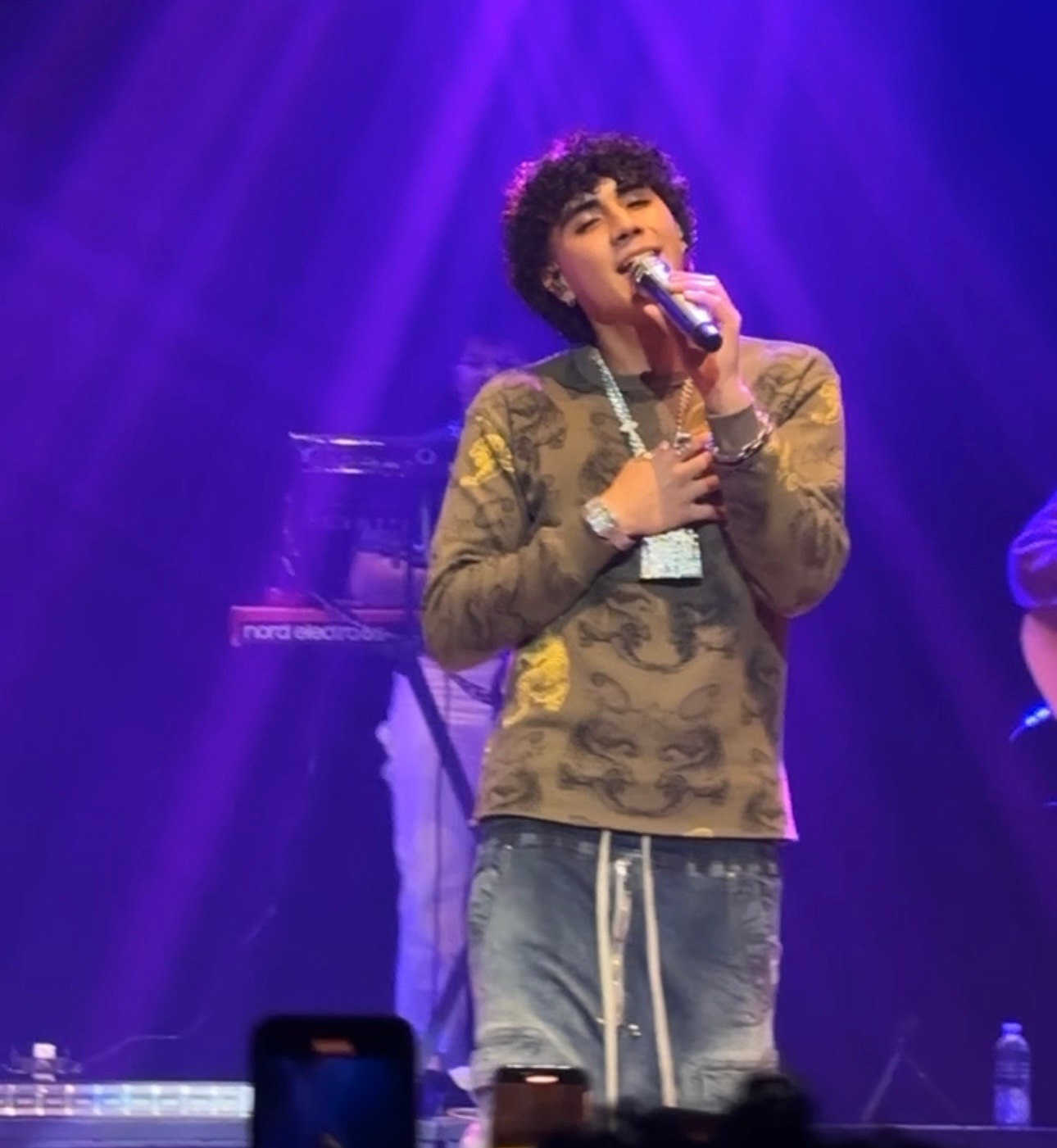
- DannyLux performing at Syracuse University

Background information
- Born: Daniel Balderrama Espinoza; March 12, 2004 (age 22); Palm Springs, California, U.S.
- Genres: Regional Mexican; Latin urban; sad sierreño; chicano indie
- Occupations: Singer; songwriter
- Instruments: Vocals; guitar
- Years active: 2020–present
- Labels: VPS; Interscope; Warner Latina
- Publisher: Universal Music Publishing Group

Daniel Balderrama Espinoza (born March 12, 2004) better known by his stage name DannyLux, is an American singer-songwriter. He is well known for his hit song with Eslabón Armado called "Jugaste y Sufrí" which introduced him to the music industry, becoming one of the biggest new names in the regional Mexican genre.

== Early life ==
Balderrama was born on March 12, 2004, in Palm Springs, California. His parents immigrated from Mexicali, Baja California. As the youngest of three brothers, he grew up in an environment influenced by his heritage and musical upbringing. At the age of six, Balderrama's father, employed as a waste collector, stumbled upon a discarded guitar and brought it home. A year later, Balderrama's mother, a church secretary, urged her son to join the church choir, providing him with a platform to develop his vocal and guitar skills.

During his studies, he started practicing soccer, where he came up with a nickname for himself, "Danny Luxury." He would later revise this name to "DannyLux," which he would use as his stage name. He was very fond of sports, but felt unhappy due to having bad grades at school and was eventually kicked off the soccer team. It was during this time, Danny remembered his guitar and immersed himself into playing.

== Career ==
When he was 16 years old in mid-2020, during the COVID-19 pandemic, he started posting covers on TikTok which gained millions of views. After making covers of songs for a while, he was inspired to write and share his first original songs. From the songs, he would upload them as videos that would help him gain more views. After covering "Dame Tu Calor" by Eslabón Armado, band leader Pedro Tovar took notice of Danny's abilities. Shortly after, the two started conversing, Tovar asked Danny to collaborate as a lyricist on the album "Corta Venas". Embracing the opportunity, he accepted and soon after went on to record the track "Jugaste y Sufrí" alongside Eslabón Armado. Following the song's release, a music video was made which has over 230 million views as of February 2024. In mid-2020, Balderrama signed a contract with VPS Music. Later in 2022, he would also be signed by Warner Music Latina.

On January 15, 2021, he released his first album, Las Dos Caras del Amor. He was accompanied on bass by his cousin Eddy and on guitar by one of his best friends, Victor Ramos. On April 29, he released the EP Love </3, featuring popular tracks such as "Mi Otra Mitad" and "Tristeza y Traición." On October 2, 2021, DannyLux hit No. 1 on the Billboard Songwriters & Producers chart, staying there for three consecutive weeks.

On January 28, 2022, he released the EP Perdido en Ti, which ranked first among Apple Music's Latin albums. He competed in the eighth edition of the Latin American Music Awards of 2023 for best collaboration in "Jugaste y Sufrí". In April 2022, DannyLux was the official opening act for Coldplay, opening for eight shows in Mexico. In July, he collaborated with Mexican-American artist Cuco on the song "Decir Adios" from the album Fantasy Gateway. On September 2, he released another EP, entitled Limerencia, with the most-played track being "Junto a Ti".

In April 2023, DannyLux performed at Coachella 2023. On June 20, 2023, DannyLux received the city keys of his hometown. Shortly after, on June 29, he released the single "Zafiro" featuring guitarist Pablo Hurtado, which became the fifth track of his new album. On August 9, Balderrama collaborated with Cuban singer Ovi and Colombian singer Blessd, in the creation of the song "Mientras no Vuelves."

Danny released another album titled DLUX a few days later, consisting of seventeen tracks and featuring various other collaborations. Among the collaborations was Mexican singer Gabito Ballesteros, Eslabón Armado, Argentine singer Yami Safdie, and American singer Jordyn Shellhart. On track 13, Dominican-American singer Melvin War joins him on "Creo Q Dios." Balderrama reconnects with Cuco for an extended version of their previous collaboration, now titled "Decir Adios Oye Narrador," on a subsequent track. Lastly, he features Venezuelan-born American singer Maye on the track named "Mi Hogar."

On September 5, Danny released "Bórrame", a collaboration with Mexican singer Kurt. Continuing with new releases, on September 21, he released "Sustancias en Mi Corazón" with Chilean singer Strangehuman. On September 28, his collaboration with Becky G was released, on her album Esquinas. The track was later performed by the duo on NPR's Tiny Desk concert series in early October. On October 10, Danny announced a tour across 11 cities in the East Coast and Midwest of the US, with the name Ambición Tour.

On January 12, 2024, Danny released the single "Un Día Entenderás". On March 1, he released the deluxe album EVOLUXION based on his last album DLUX. The album includes new and updated tracks such as "Maldito Alcohol" and "Ciudad del Sol". Calentón Music Festival at Syracuse University on October 19, 2024, was Danny's first performance at the university's annual Calentón Hispanic Music Festival—honoring National Hispanic Heritage Month

=== 2025–2026 ===
In January 2025, Balderrama performed alongside Eslabon Armado and Cuco at the Viva Music Festival's "I Heart L.A." benefit concert, with all proceeds directed to MusiCares to support musicians affected by the Los Angeles wildfires. On May 15, he released Leyenda, his fourth studio album, accompanied by a short film of the same name in which he appeared as an actor for the first time. The album contains 19 tracks with contributions from Jasiel Nuñez, Yng Naz, and Juanchito. Its creation was shaped by the theft of a hard drive containing his unreleased recordings from his engineer's rental car; Balderrama rebuilt much of the project from demo material and newly written songs after his Mexican tour, later noting that they were "the saddest songs I've ever made." Leyenda ranked sixth on Billboard's Latin Best Albums of the Year list, and its track "Sirena" was named the sixth-best Latin song of 2025 by Billboard's staff. The album earned Balderrama his second consecutive nomination for Best Contemporary Mexican Music Album at the 26th Annual Latin Grammy Awards. In June 2025, DannyLux made his first appearance at Paris Fashion Week, walking the runway at Willy Chavarria's "Huron" Spring/Summer 2026 show. The presentation was a politically charged statement about the treatment of deported immigrants, opening with 35 models kneeling in a formation referencing conditions in Salvadoran detention facilities; the opening was produced in partnership with the American Civil Liberties Union. DannyLux walked the runway alongside RaiNao, Becky G, and James Harden, among others.

On January 8, 2026, DannyLux entered into a worldwide publishing agreement with Universal Music Publishing Group (UMPG). In a statement, he said he was "ready to keep evolving and open this new chapter with all my heart." The deal was brokered through UMPG's Latin division alongside Ana Rosa Santiago, senior vice president of A&R Latin music, and Jamie Kinelski, senior vice president of A&R. On February 27, he collaborated on the single "Distinto" with Mexican indie pop artist RPLK. On June 5, he released "House of Lux (Jump on the Pitch Remix)" with American artist Ckdageneral, a rework of his 2023 DLUX track.

== Discography ==
=== Studio albums ===
Title	Details	Certifications
Las Dos Caras del Amor	Released: January 15, 2021; Label: VPS Music LLC, Interscope Records; Formats: Digital download, streaming	—
Perdido en Ti	Released: January 28, 2022; Label: VPS Music LLC, Warner Music Latina; Formats: Digital download, streaming	—
DLUX	Released: August 18, 2023; Label: VPS Music LLC, Warner Music Latina; Formats: LP, digital download, streaming	RIAA: Gold (Latin)
Leyenda	Released: May 15, 2025; Label: VPS Music LLC, Warner Music Latina; Formats: Digital download, streaming	—

=== Reissues ===
Title	Details	Certifications
Evoluxion	Released: March 1, 2024; Label: VPS Music LLC, Warner Music Latina; Formats: Digital download, streaming	* RIAA: Gold (Latin)

=== EPs ===
Title	Details
Love </3	Released: April 29, 2021; Label: VPS Music LLC, Warner Music Latina; Formats: Digital download, streaming
Limerencia	Released: September 2, 2022; Label: VPS Music LLC, Warner Music Latina; Formats: Digital download, streaming

=== Singles ===
==== As lead artist ====
List of singles as lead artist, with selected chart positions and certifications, showing year released and album name
Title	Year	Peak chart positions	Certifications	Album
Title	Year	US	Certifications	Album
"24:7"	2020	—		Non-album singles
"Amor Medicinal"	2020	—		Non-album singles
"Falsos Sentimientos"	2021	—		Las Dos Caras Del Amor
"Amor" (with Alta Elegancia)	2021	—		856 Para El Mundo
"Nos Pertenecemos"	2021	—		Non-album single
"Mi Otra Mitad"	2021	—	RIAA: Gold (Latin)	Love </3
"Tristeza y Traición"	2021	—	RIAA: 3× Platinum (Latin)	Love </3
"Como Tu Quieras"	2022	—	RIAA: Gold (Latin)	Perdido En Ti
"Infeliz"	2022	—	RIAA: Gold (Latin)	Perdido En Ti
"Sabe Que La Quiero" (with Yagooo)	2022	—		Fam Love Money
"Junto A Tí"	2022	—	RIAA: Gold (Latin)	Limerencia
"No Te Quiero Perder"	2022	—	RIAA: Gold (Latin)	Limerencia
"Triste Navidad"	2022	—		Non-album single
"El Hombre Perfecto"	2023	—	RIAA: Gold (Latin)	Non-album single
"Te Fallé"	2023	—		DLUX
"Triste Verano" (with Estevie)	2023	—		Non-album single
"Tú Me Llevas a Un Espacio" (with Los Aptos)	2023	—		Descifrar
"Te Extraño y Lo Siento..."	2023	—		DLUX
"Dime Ma" (with Yagooo & Jiubel)	2023	—		Fam Love Money
"Belico Enamorado" (with Gabito Ballesteros)	2023	—		Non-album single
"Zafiro" (featuring Pablo Hurtado)	2023	—		DLUX
"Mientras no Vuelves" (with Ovi & Blessd)	2023	—		El Asere de Aseres
"Amar Y Perder"	2023	—		DLUX
"Mi Hogar" (with Maye)	2023	—		DLUX
"Bórrame" (with Kurt)	2023	—		Non-album singles
"Sustancias en Mi Corazon" (with Strangehuman)	2023	—	RIAA: Platinum (Latin)	Non-album singles
"Corazón Frío" (with Jasiel Nuñez)	2023	—	RIAA: Diamond (Latin)	La Odisea
"Tu Belleza" (with Christian Lara)	2023	—		Non-album single
"Rompo Esquemas" (with Leo Rizzi)	2023	—		Pájaro Azul
"Alguien Más" (with Yami Safdie)	2023	—		DLUX
"Un Día Entenderás"	2024	—		Evoluxion
"awitado :(" (with Leon Leiden)	2024	—		Aquí Estoy
"Ciudad de Sol"	2024	—		Evoluxion
"Katy Perry" (with Joaquin Medina & Calle 24 featuring Sheeno)	2024	—		Non-album single
"Rlux" (with Erre)	2024	—		Desde Mi Habitación
"Sal De Mi Mente" (with Yng Naz)	2024	—		Nos Fuimos De Casa
"Decirte Lo Que Siento" (with Michaël Brun & Ariza)	2024	—		Non-album singles
"El 100" (with Sofía Reyes)	2024	—		Non-album singles
"Soltera" (with 8onthebeat)	2024	—		Non-album singles
"Lento" (with Sofía Valdés)	2024	—		Sofía Valdés
"Midnight"	2024	—		Non-album single
"No Me Borres" (with Dariell Cano)	2025	—		Romántico Sin Esperanza
"Ya No Estás"	2025	—		Leyenda
"Cielo Eterno" (with Jasiel Nuñez)	2025	—	RIAA: Platinum (Latin)	Leyenda
"Sinkronizamos" (with Paloma Mami)	2025	—		Códigos De Muñeka
"House of Lux (Jump on the Pitch Remix)" (with Ckdageneral)	2026	—		Non-album single

==== As featured artist ====
List of singles as featured artist showing year released and album name
Title	Year	Peak chart positions		Album
Title	Year	US	US Latin	Album
"Jugaste y Sufrí" (Eslabón Armado featuring DannyLux)	2020	69	3	Corta Venas
"Me Voy Contigo" (Los Aptos featuring DannyLux)	2021	—	—	Lluvia Y Sol

=== Other charted and certified songs ===
Title	Year	Peak chart positions		Certifications	Album
Title	Year	US Bub.	US Latin	Certifications	Album
"Si Supieras" (Eslabon Armado featuring DannyLux)	2022	12	27		Nostalgia
"House of Lux"	2023	—	—	RIAA: Platinum (Latin)	DLUX

=== Guest appearances ===
Title	Year	Other artist(s)	Album
"Decir Adios"	2022	Cuco	Fantasy Gateway
"Me Decepcionaste"	2023	Eslabon Armado	Desvelado
"Cries in Spanish"	2023	Becky G	Esquinas
"Amigos Para Qué"	2023	Yami Safdie	Sur
"Nostalgia en el Viento"	2024	EddyJae	Mixtape 1 - EP
"Mi Tormenta"	2024	The Black Keys	Ohio Players (Trophy Edition)
"Chilling"	2024	Yng Naz	De Moda
"Distinto"	2026	RPLK	Non-album single

== Awards and nominations ==
List of awards and nominations received by DannyLux
Award	Year	Recipient(s) and nominee(s)	Category	Result	Ref.
Billboard Latin Music Awards	2022	Jugaste y Sufrí (with Eslabon Armado)	Regional Mexican Song of the Year	Nominated	
Latin Grammy Awards	2024	Evoluxion	Best Contemporary Mexican Music Album	Nominated	
Latin Grammy Awards	2025	Leyenda	Best Contemporary Mexican Music Album	Nominated	
Premios Juventud	2022	Himself	The New Generation - Regional Mexican	Nominated	
Premio Lo Nuestro	2023	Himself	Regional Mexican New Artist of the Year	Nominated	
