= Desvelado (Eslabón Armado album) =

Studio album by Eslabón Armado
- Released: April 28, 2023
- Genre: Regional Mexican; urban sierreño; sad sierreño
- Length: 57:52
- Label: DEL Records
- Producer: Pedro Tovar; Edgar Rodriguez

Eslabón Armado chronology
Nostalgia (2022)	Desvelado (2023)	Amor Perdido (2024)

Singles from Desvelado
- 1. "Ella Baila Sola" Released: March 17, 2023; 2. "Quédate Conmigo" Released: April 28, 2023

Desvelado (transl. Sleepless) is the sixth studio album by Mexican American regional Mexican group Eslabón Armado, which was released on April 28, 2023, through DEL Records. The album follows their fifth album Nostalgia (2022) and spawned two singles: "Ella Baila Sola" with Peso Pluma and "Quédate Conmigo" with Grupo Frontera.

The album contains 16 songs, eight of which are collaborations with Grupo Frontera, Luis R. Conriquez, Peso Pluma, Jhayco, Óscar Maydon, Junior H, DannyLux, and Edgardo Nuñez. The album debuted at number six on the Billboard 200 with 44,000 album-equivalent units, making it the second regional Mexican album to reach the chart's top 10.

== Background ==
In March 2023, the group and Peso Pluma released "Ella Baila Sola", as the lead single from the album. The single was globally successful, appearing on numerous charts worldwide, and peaked number four on the US Billboard Hot 100, marking the first regional Mexican song to reach the top five on the chart. The album was released on April 27, 2023, and a music video for "Quédate Conmigo" was released on the same day of release, as the second single from the album.

== Commercial performance ==
Desvelado debuted at number six on the US Billboard 200, with 44,000 album-equivalent units in its first week, the highest for any regional Mexican album at the time. It also debuted atop the US Billboard Top Latin Albums and US Regional Mexican Albums charts. It is the second regional Mexican album, as well as the second by the group, to peak on top 10 on the US Billboard 200, after the group's album Nostalgia (2022) and is the group's sixth consecutive number-one album on the US Regional Mexican Albums chart.

== Track listing ==
All tracks are written by Pedro Tovar, except where noted.

Desvelado track listing
No.	Title	Writer(s)	Length
1.	"Quien Es El?"	Pedro Ángel Tovar Jr.	3:50
2.	"Quédate Conmigo" (with Grupo Frontera)	Edgar Barrera; Tovar	2:40
3.	"Dame Otro Beso"		4:02
4.	"Así Lo Quiso Dios" (with Luis R. Conriquez)		3:25
5.	"Terminé Sufriendo"		3:15
6.	"Ella Baila Sola" (with Peso Pluma)		2:45
7.	"Tomando Tequila" (with Jhayco)	Jesús Manuel Nieves Cortés; Tovar	3:56
8.	"Llamarte o Bloquearte" (with Óscar Maydon)		3:09
9.	"Vamos Contra el Mundo"		3:54
10.	"Mejor Acabar" (with Junior H)		3:49
11.	"Nunca Es Suficiente"	Daniela Azpiazu; María Natalia Lafourcade Silva; Anthony López	4:53
12.	"Me Decepcionaste" (with DannyLux)		3:59
13.	"Gracias a Tí"		3:35
14.	"Hermosura de Mujer" (with Edgardo Nuñez)		3:44
15.	"Valió Madre"		3:47
16.	"Perdón Jefa"		3:00
Total length:			57:52

== Charts ==
=== Weekly charts ===
Weekly chart performance for Desvelado
Chart (2023)	Peak position
US Billboard 200	6
US Independent Albums (Billboard)	1
US Regional Mexican Albums (Billboard)	1
US Top Latin Albums (Billboard)	1

=== Year-end charts ===
Year-end chart performance for Desvelado
Chart (2023)	Position
US Billboard 200	130
US Independent Albums (Billboard)	21
US Regional Mexican Albums (Billboard)	3
US Top Latin Albums (Billboard)	6

== See also ==
- 2023 in Latin music
- List of number-one Billboard Latin Albums from the 2020s
