= Ella Baila Sola (song) =

Single by Eslabón Armado and Peso Pluma

from the album Desvelado
- Language: Spanish
- English title: "She Dances Alone"
- Released: March 17, 2023
- Genre: Regional Mexican; sierreño; urban ranchera
- Length: 2:45
- Label: DEL Records; Prajin Parlay / Worms Music
- Songwriter: Pedro Tovar
- Producers: Maurillo Pineda Jr.; Pedro Tovar; Ernesto Fernandez

Eslabon Armado singles chronology
"Jugaste y Sufrí" (2020)	"Ella Baila Sola" (2023)	"Quédate Conmigo" (2023)

Peso Pluma singles chronology
"El Hechizo" (2023)	"Ella Baila Sola" (2023)	"La Bebé" (remix) (2023)

Music video
- "Ella Baila Sola" on YouTube

"Ella Baila Sola" (transl. "She Dances Alone") is a song by the American regional Mexican group Eslabón Armado and Mexican singer Peso Pluma. It was released on March 17, 2023, through DEL Records and Prajin Parlay, as the lead single for the group's album Desvelado (2023). "Ella Baila Sola" is a sierreño song that lyrically talks about two young men at a party seeing a woman dancing alone. The song was written and produced by Pedro Tovar, with co-production being handled by Maurillo Pineda Jr. and Ernesto Fernandez.

Originally teased as a short clip on TikTok, "Ella Baila Sola" would go viral on the platform days before its official release on streaming platforms. Its virality would eventually lead up to it becoming the first regional Mexican song in history to reach the top 10 of the US Billboard Hot 100, peaking at No. 4, as well as the first to top the Billboard Global 200. The song also appeared on charts in Canada, Ireland, New Zealand, Spain, and Switzerland. It was critically acclaimed, with Rolling Stone naming it the best song of 2023, as well as placing it on their "500 Greatest Songs of All Time" list.

"Ella Baila Sola" received several nominations and was certified 21× Platinum, in the Latin field, by the Recording Industry Association of America (RIAA) for selling over 1 million copies. Other certifications were given by Italy, Portugal and Spain. To date, it is the group and the singer's most commercially successful single, with over 1 billion streams on Spotify; the milestone was reached at the end of 2023, making it the first regional Mexican song to do so. Peso Pluma would release a remix version of "La Bebé" with Yng Lvcas, simultaneously with "Ella Baila Sola", where it also performed successfully, peaking at No. 11 on the Billboard Hot 100 along with the latter's peak.

== Background ==
Lead singer Pedro Tovar contacted Peso Pluma to record a song he had written and sang part of it through the phone, instead of sending a recording. It led them to scheduling a recording session in a studio with Ernesto Fernandez, a producer at Prajin Parlay. Days before the song's release, Tovar would also preview the song on social platforms, mainly TikTok and Instagram, where the song would go viral on TikTok days later.

Tovar called working with Pluma "probably one of [his] best collabs" as they got along well in the studio, and stated that he appreciated the collaboration as "it benefited [them] both". Tovar knew that "Ella Baila Sola" would be a hit and had stated that it was his easiest song he has written, with both artists expressing their surprise at the song's success.

== Composition ==
"Ella Baila Sola"
A 22-second sample of the first verses of "Ella Baila Sola".

"Ella Baila Sola" has been referred to as a sierreño song with a length of two minutes and 45 seconds. It is set in the time signature of 3/4 and is composed in the key of F minor with a tempo of 148 beats per minute. Its instruments used include the requinto guitar, tenor horns, the tololoche, and the valve trombone, with a part of instruments being provided by Peso Pluma.

The song was written entirely by Tovar, who told Billboard that it was not based on his own experience, rather on "pure imagination." The song's lyrics revolve around two friends at a party who see a beautiful woman "dancing alone", which alludes to the song title; "Ella Baila Sola" translates to "She Dances Alone." It's mostly known for its first verse sung by Tovar: "Compa, ¿qué le parece esa morra? / La que anda bailando sola, me gusta pa' mí," which translates to "Buddy, what do you think of that girl? / The one who's dancing alone, I like her for me."

== Critical reception ==
Isabela Raygoza at Billboard stated that the song "comes in hard with a fiery guitar melody that instantly captivates from start to finish, and the vocal interplay between Peso [Pluma] and Eslabón Armado sounds perfect," concluding that "the song will be on the list of the best Latin songs of all time." Rolling Stone named "Ella Baila Sola" as the best song of 2023 and ranked it at number 402 on its list of "500 Greatest Songs of All Time".

=== Accolades ===
Critics' lists
Publication	List	Rank	Ref.
Billboard	Best Songs of 2023	31	
Rolling Stone	The 100 Best Songs of 2023	1	

== Commercial performance ==
=== North America ===
"Ella Baila Sola" debuted on Billboard Hot 100 at number 26 on the issue dated April 1, 2023, and would reach the top 10 on its fourth week on the chart, making it the first regional Mexican song to do so. It rose to number four in its sixth week, which marked the highest position for any Mexican artist on the chart and Eslabon Armado's second charting, after "Jugaste y Sufrí" with DannyLux which peaked at number 69 on the chart. Originally debuting at number two, the song would top the US Hot Latin Songs chart in its third week. The song would debut at number seven on the US Regional Mexican Airplay and number 20 on the US Latin Airplay charts, later reaching at numbers one and four on both charts, respectively. It would later top the US Latin Airplay chart. "Ella Baila Sola" also debuted atop the Mexico Songs chart and peaked at number 62 on the Canadian Hot 100.

=== Global ===
"Ella Baila Sola" debuted at number three Billboard Global 200, later topping the chart, which marked the first regional Mexican number-one single of the chart and the first number-one single for a Mexican artist. The song was the most streamed song on Spotify in the summer of 2023, globally, attaining more than 367 million streams, becoming the first regional Mexican song to achieve the title. It was the second most streamed song in the United States, during the same period, on the platform. It would garner over 1 billion streams on Spotify by the end of December 2023, making it the first regional Mexican song to reach the milestone.

== Music video ==
A music video was uploaded on April 7, 2023, on DEL Records' YouTube channel, which stars Peso Pluma and the group, along with models Jailyne Ojeda and Valeria Pambi. The video was filmed in a Beverly Hills, California mansion, and was inspired by the 2013 film The Great Gatsby. The video attained over 10 million views in its first four days after its released and was trending on various platforms such as YouTube, Facebook and Twitch, where content creators, from different regions of the world, made first impression reactions to the video, leading to the increase of views and streams on the song.

== Live performances ==
The song was included in the set of songs played on Peso Pluma's Doble P Tour. On April 28, 2023, Pluma performed the song for the first time on television on Jimmy Fallon's The Tonight Show, which made him the first regional Mexican artist to perform on the show. On September 15, 2023, Eslabon Armado performed the song on Good Morning America to celebrate Hispanic Heritage Month, also making them the first regional Mexican artist or group to perform on the program. On November 16, 2023, both artists performed the song at the 24th Annual Latin Grammy Awards, which is the first performance of both artists together.

== Awards and nominations ==
Awards and nominations for "Ella Baila Sola"
Year	Organization	Category	Result	Ref.
2023	Billboard Latin Music Awards	Hot Latin Song Of The Year	Won	
2023	Billboard Latin Music Awards	Global 200 Latin Song Of The Year	Nominated	
2023	Billboard Latin Music Awards	Hot Latin Song Of The Year, Vocal Event	Won	
2023	Billboard Latin Music Awards	Sales Song Of The Year	Nominated	
2023	Billboard Latin Music Awards	Streaming Song Of The Year	Won	
2023	Billboard Latin Music Awards	Regional Mexican Song Of The Year	Won	
2023	Billboard Music Awards	Top Latin Song	Won	
2023	Latin Grammy Awards	Song Of The Year	Nominated	
2023	Latin Grammy Awards	Best Regional Mexican Song	Nominated	
2023	Los 40 Music Awards	Best Latin Song	Nominated	
2023	Los 40 Music Awards	Best Latin Collaboration	Nominated	
2023	MTV Millennial Awards	Global Hit Of The Year	Nominated	
2023	MTV Millennial Awards	Viral Anthem	Nominated	
2023	MTV Video Music Awards	Best Latin	Nominated	
2023	Premios Juventud	Best Regional Mexican Song	Won	

== Charts ==
=== Weekly charts ===
Weekly chart performance for "Ella Baila Sola"
Chart (2023)	Peak position
Argentina Hot 100 (Billboard)	43
Bolivia (Billboard)	2
Canada Hot 100 (Billboard)	62
Chile (Billboard)	4
Colombia (Billboard)	1
Dominican Republic (Monitor Latino)	4
El Salvador (Monitor Latino)	2
Ecuador (Billboard)	1
Global 200 (Billboard)	1
Ireland (IRMA)	61
Lithuania (AGATA)	21
Luxembourg (Billboard)	22
Mexico (Billboard)	1
Netherlands (Single Tip)	1
New Zealand Hot Singles (RMNZ)	26
Peru (Billboard)	6
Portugal (AFP)	25
Spain (PROMUSICAE)	10
Sweden Heatseeker (Sverigetopplistan)	1
Switzerland (Schweizer Hitparade)	37
US Billboard Hot 100	4
US Hot Latin Songs (Billboard)	1
US Latin Airplay (Billboard)	1
US Regional Mexican Airplay (Billboard)	1

=== Year-end charts ===
Year-end chart performance for "Ella Baila Sola"
Chart (2023)	Position
Bolivia (Monitor Latino)	42
Colombia (Monitor Latino)	2
Costa Rica (Monitor Latino)	25
Dominican Republic (Monitor Latino)	14
El Salvador (Monitor Latino)	7
Global 200 (Billboard)	12
Guatemala (Monitor Latino)	33
Mexico (Monitor Latino)	15
Peru (Monitor Latino)	7
Spain (PROMUSICAE)	51
US Billboard Hot 100	26
US Hot Latin Songs (Billboard)	1
US Latin Airplay (Billboard)	13
US Regional Mexican Airplay (Billboard)	5

== Certifications ==
Certifications for "Ella Baila Sola"
Region	Certification	Certified units/sales
Italy (FIMI)	Gold	50,000^{‡}
Portugal (AFP)	Gold	5,000^{‡}
Spain (Promusicae)	3× Platinum	180,000^{‡}
United States (RIAA)	21× Platinum (Latin)	1,260,000^{‡}
^{‡} Sales+streaming figures based on certification alone.

== See also ==
- List of Latin songs on the Billboard Hot 100
- List of Billboard Global 200 number ones of 2023
- List of Billboard Hot Latin Songs and Latin Airplay number ones of 2023
- List of number-one Billboard Regional Mexican Songs of 2023
