= 2022 Billboard Latin Music Awards =

American entertainment award ceremony

29th Billboard Latin Music Awards
- Date: September 29, 2022
- Site: Watsco Center, Coral Gables, Florida, United States
- Hosted by: Kate del Castillo, Jaime Camil

Highlights
- Most awards: Bad Bunny (8)
- Most nominations: Bad Bunny (23)

Television coverage
- Network: Telemundo
- Ratings: 1.551 million

The 29th Billboard Latin Music Awards ceremony, presented by Billboard to honor the most popular albums, songs and performers in Latin music, took place on September 29, 2022, at the Watsco Center in Coral Gables, Florida. The ceremony was broadcast by Telemundo.

The nominations were announced on August 18, 2022. Puerto Rican singer Chayanne received the Icon Award at the ceremony. Christina Aguilera was honored with the Spirit of Hope award, and also performed.

== Performers ==
The performers for the ceremony were announced on August 25, 2022.

List of performers at the 29th Billboard Latin Music Awards
Artist(s)	Song(s)
Alejandra Guzmán Angela Aguilar CNCO Pablo López	Tribute to Raphael “Mi gran noche” “Estar enamorado” "Como yo te amo” “Que sabe nadie” “Escándalo”
Calibre 50	"El mexicano es ca..."
Camilo	"Aeropuerto"
Chayanne	"Como Tú y Yo"
Christina Aguilera	"La Reina"
Elvis Crespo	"Neverita" "Suavemente"
Eslabon Armado	"Hasta La Muerte"
Farruko	"Nazareno (Remix)" "Viaje"
Grupo Firme Camilo	"Ya Supérame" "Alaska"
Los Ángeles Azules Carlos Vives	"Cumbia del Corazón"
Maluma	"Junio"
Manuel Turizo	"La Bachata"
Ozuna	"La Copa"
Pepe Aguilar	"Hasta Que Llegue El Alba"
Piso 21 Manuel Turizo	"Los Cachos"
Raphael	"De tanta gente"
Tini	"Carne Y Hueso"

== Winners and nominees ==
The nominations were announced on August 18, 2022. Puerto Rican artist Bad Bunny received the most nominations (23, winning 9), followed by Colombian singer Karol G (15, winning 3), Puerto Rican artists Farruko (11, winning 3), and Rauw Alejandro (10, winning 2), Dominican group Aventura (7) and Mexican regional group Eslabon Armado (6). With his 23 nominations, Bad Bunny became one of two artists to receive that number of nominations in a single ceremony, the other being Ozuna, at the 2019 Billboard Latin Music Awards.

Winners appear first and highlighted in bold.

Artist of the Year	New Artist of the Year
**Bad Bunny**; Farruko; Jhayco; Karol G; Rauw Alejandro	**Ivan Cornejo**; Los Gemelos de Sinaloa; Los Lara; Luis R. Conriquez; Yahritza y Su Esencia
Tour of the Year	Crossover Artist of the Year
**Bad Bunny**; Los Bukis; Maluma; Marc Anthony; Ricky Martin & Enrique Iglesias	**Skrillex**; Chris Brown; DJ Khaled; Ed Sheeran; Rvssian; Shawn Mendes
Hot Latin Song of the Year	Hot Latin Song of the Year, Vocal Event
**Farruko – Pepas**; Bad Bunny feat. Chencho Corleone – Me Porto Bonito; Bad Bunny – Tití Me Preguntó; Bad Bunny – Yonaguni; Becky G feat. Karol G – Mamiii	**Becky G feat. Karol G – Mamiii**; Aventura feat. Bad Bunny – Volví; Bad Bunny feat. Bomba Estéreo – Ojitos Lindos; Bad Bunny feat. Chencho Corleone – Me Porto Bonito; Bad Bunny feat. Rauw Alejandro – Party
Hot Latin Songs Artist of the Year, Male	Hot Latin Songs Artist of the Year, Female
**Bad Bunny**; Farruko; Jhayco; Chencho Corleone; Rauw Alejandro	**Karol G**; Anitta; Becky G; Kali Uchis; Rosalía
Duo/Group Hot Latin Songs Artist of the Year	Hot Latin Songs Label of the Year
**Grupo Firme**; Aventura; Calibre 50; Eslabon Armado; Fuerza Regida	**Rimas**; Music VIP; Sony Music Latin; Universal Music Latin Entertainment; Warner Latina
Hot Latin Songs Imprint of the Year	Airplay Song of the Year
**Rimas**; Carbon Fiber; Duars Entertainment; Sony Music Latin; Universal Music Latino	**Rauw Alejandro – Todo de Ti**; Aventura feat. Bad Bunny – Volví; Becky G feat. Karol G – Mamiii; Farruko – "Pepas"; Farruko feat. Víctor Cárdenas & DJ Adonis – El Incomprendido
Airplay Label of the Year	Airplay Imprint of the Year
**Sony Music Latin**; Lizos; Rimas; Universal Music Latin Entertainment; Warner Latina	**Sony Music Latin**; Duars Entertainment; Fonovisa; Rimas; Universal Music Latino
Top Latin Album of the Year	Top Latin Albums Artist of the Year, Duo/Group
**Bad Bunny – Un Verano Sin Ti**; Farruko – La 167; J Balvin – Jose; Karol G – KG0516; Rauw Alejandro – Vice Versa	**Eslabon Armado**; Aventura; Calibre 50; Los Bukis; Maná
Top Latin Albums Artist of the Year, Male	Top Latin Albums Artist of the Year, Female
**Bad Bunny**; Anuel AA; J Balvin; Ozuna; Rauw Alejandro	**Karol G**; Becky G; Kali Uchis; Natti Natasha; Rosalía
Top Latin Albums Label of the Year	Top Latin Albums Imprint of the Year
**Rimas**; Del; Sony Music Latin; Universal Music Latin Entertainment; Warner Latina	**Rimas**; Del; Duars Entertainment; Sony Music Latin; Universal Music Latino
Latin Pop Artist of the Year	Latin Pop Duo/Group of the Year
**Enrique Iglesias**; Becky G; Camilo; Kali Uchis; Sebastián Yatra	**Maná**; Bomba Estéreo; CNCO; Jesse & Joy; Reik
Latin Pop Song of the Year	Latin Pop Album of the Year
**Rauw Alejandro – Todo de Ti**; Becky G feat. Karol G – Mamiii; Karol G – Provenza; Sebastián Yatra – Tacones Rojos; Shakira feat. Rauw Alejandro – Te Felicito	**Rosalía – Motomami**; Becky G – Esquemas; Enrique Iglesias – Final (Vol. 1); Jay Wheeler – De Mi Para Ti; Sebastián Yatra – Dharma
Latin Pop Airplay Label of the Year	Latin Pop Airplay Imprint of the Year
**Sony Music Latin**; Rimas; Universal Music Latin Entertainment; Warner Latina; WK	**Sony Music Latin**; Duars Entertainment; Hecho a Mano; RCA; Universal Music Latino
Latin Pop Albums Label of the Year	Latin Pop Albums Imprint of the Year
**Universal Music Latin Entertainment**; Interscope Geffen A&M Records; RCA; Sony Music Latin; Warner Latina	**Universal Music Latino**; Capitol Latin; Hecho a Mano; Sony Music Latin; Warner Latina
Tropical Artist of the Year, Solo	Tropical Artist of the Year, Duo or Group
**Prince Royce**; Carlos Vives; Elvis Crespo; Marc Anthony; Romeo Santos	**Aventura**; Gente de Zona; La Sonora Dinamita; Los Ángeles Azules; Monchy & Alexandra
Tropical Song of the Year	Tropical Album of the Year
**Aventura feat. Bad Bunny – Volví**; Don Omar feat. Nio Garcia – Se Menea; Marc Anthony – Mala; Marc Anthony – Pa'lla Voy; Romeo Santos – Sus Huellas	**Marc Anthony – Pa'lla Voy**; Buena Vista Social Club – Ahora Me Da Pena EP; Carlos Vives – Cumbiana II; El Gran Combo de Puerto Rico – De Trulla Con El Combo; Luis Vargas & Frank Reyes – Grandes de La Bachata: Vol. IV
Tropical Songs Airplay Label of the Year	Tropical Songs Airplay Imprint of the Year
**Sony Music Latin**; Columbia; Rimas; Saban; WK	**Sony Music Latin**; Aura; Hecho a Mano; Rimas; Unisono
Tropical Albums Label of the Year	Tropical Albums Imprint of the Year
**Sony Music Latin**; BMG; Discos Fuentes; The Orchard; Universal Music Latin Entertainment	**Sony Music Latin**; Norte; Premium Latin; The Orchard; Top Stop
Regional Mexican Artist of the Year, Solo	Regional Mexican Artist of the Year, Duo or Group
**Christian Nodal**; Carin Leon; Ivan Cornejo; Junior H; Natanael Cano	**Eslabon Armado**; Banda MS de Sergio Lizárraga; Calibre 50; Grupo Firme; Yahritza y Su Esencia
Regional Mexican Song of the Year	Regional Mexican Album of the Year
**Grupo Firme – Ya Supérame (En Vivo Desde Culiacán, Sinaloa)**; Calibre 50 – A la Antigüita; Eslabon Armado feat. DannyLux – Jugaste y Sufrí; Grupo Firme feat. Carin Leon – El Tóxico; Grupo Firme feat. Maluma – Cada Quien	**Ivan Cornejo – Alma Vacía**; Calibre 50 – Las 20 Número 1 de Calibre 50 en Billboard; Eslabon Armado – Nostalgia; Eslabon Armado – Tu Veneno Mortal, Vol. 2; Junior H – Mi Vida En Un Cigarro 2
Regional Mexican Airplay Label of the Year	Regional Mexican Airplay Imprint of the Year
**Universal Music Latin Entertainment**; Afinarte; Lizos; Music VIP; Sony Music Latin	**Fonovisa**; Afinarte; Disa; Lizos; Remex
Regional Mexican Albums Label of the Year	Regional Mexican Albums Imprint of the Year
**Universal Music Latin Entertainment**; Del; Manzana; Rancho Humilde; Sony Music Latin	**DEL**; Fonovisa; JHRH; Manzana; Z Records
Latin Rhythm Artist of the Year, Solo	Latin Rhythm Artist of the Year, Duo or Group
**Bad Bunny**; Farruko; J Balvin; Karol G; Rauw Alejandro	**Wisin & Yandel**; Baby Rasta & Gringo; Los Legendarios; Piso 21; Zion & Lennox
Latin Rhythm Song of the Year	Latin Rhythm Album of the Year
**Farruko – Pepas**; Bad Bunny feat. Chencho Corleone – Me Porto Bonito; Aventura feat. Bad Bunny – Volví; Bad Bunny – Yonaguni; Becky G feat. Karol G – Mamiii	**Bad Bunny – Un Verano Sin Ti**; Farruko – La 167; J Balvin – Jose; Karol G – KG0516; Rauw Alejandro – Vice Versa
Latin Rhythm Airplay Label of the Year	Latin Rhythm Airplay Imprint of the Year
**Sony Music Latin**; Republic; Rimas; Universal Music Latin Entertainment; Warner Latina	**Universal Music Latino**; Carbon Fiber; Duars Entertainment; Rimas; Sony Music Latin
Latin Rhythm Albums Label of the Year	Latin Rhythm Albums Imprint of the Year
**Rimas**; Interscope Geffen A&M Records; Real Hasta La Muerte; Sony Music Latin; Universal Music Latin Entertainment	**Rimas**; Carbon Fiber; Duars Entertainment; Real Hasta La Muerte; Universal Music Latino
Songwriter of the Year	Producer of the Year
**Bad Bunny**; Edgar "Edge" Barrera; Marco "Mag" Borrero; Roberto "La Paciencia" Rosario; Tainy	**Tainy**; Jimmy Humilde; Marco "Mag" Borrero; Ovy On The Drums; Subelo Neo
Publisher of the Year	Publishing Corporation of the Year
**RSM Publishing, ASCAP**; Kid From The BKLYN Publishing, ASCAP; Sony Discos Music Publishing LLC, ASCAP; Universal Music Corp, ASCAP; WC Music Corp., ASCAP	**Sony Music Publishing**; Kobalt Music; RSM Publishing; Universal Music; Warner Chappell Music

=== Special Merit Awards ===
  - Icon Award: Chayanne
  - Lifetime Achievement Award: Raphael
  - Spirit of Hope: Christina Aguilera
  - Legend Award: José Feliciano
