= Billboard Icon Award =

American music award

The Billboard Icon Award was established at the 2011 Billboard Music Awards to recognize music singers and contribution. The recipient of the award also performs during the ceremony. In 2021, the Icon Award was included on the Billboard Latin Music Awards.

== Recipients ==
=== Billboard Icon Award ===
Year	Image	Recipient	Performance	Ref.
2011		Neil Diamond	"Sweet Caroline", "America"	
2012		Stevie Wonder	"Higher Ground", "Overjoyed", "Empire State of Mind", "Join Our Love", "Superstition"	
2013		Prince	"Let's Go Crazy", "Fixurlifeup"	
2014		Jennifer Lopez	"First Love"	
2015	—N/a			
2016		Celine Dion	"The Show Must Go On"	
2017		Cher	"Believe", "If I Could Turn Back Time"	
2018		Janet Jackson	"Nasty", "If", "Throb"	
2019		Mariah Carey	"A No No", "Always Be My Baby", "Emotions", "We Belong Together", "Hero"	
2020		Garth Brooks	"The Thunder Rolls", "Callin' Baton Rouge", "The River", "Standing Outside the Fire", "That Summer", "Dive Bar", "Friends in Low Places", "The Dance"	
2021		Pink	"Cover Me in Sunshine", "All I Know So Far", "Get The Party Started", "So What", "Blow Me (One Last Kiss)", "Who Knew", "Just Like a Pill", "Just Give Me a Reason"	
2022		Mary J Blige	—N/a	

=== Billboard Latin Music Awards ===
Year	Image	Recipient	Performance	Ref.
2021		Maná	"El Reloj Cucú"	
2022		Chayanne	"Como Tú y Yo"	
2023		Ivy Queen	—N/a	
2025		Laura Pausini	"Mi Historia Entre Tus Dedos"	
2026		Rubén Blades	TBA	
