= List of Billboard Regional Mexican Albums number ones of 2021 =

The Regional Mexican Albums, published in Billboard magazine, is a record chart that features Latin music sales information for regional styles of Mexican music. This data are compiled by Nielsen SoundScan from a sample that includes music stores, music departments at department stores, verifiable sales from concert venues and track equivalent album units and streaming equivalent album units in the United States.

== Chart history ==
Issue date	Album	Artist(s)	Ref.
January 2	Corta Venas	Eslabon Armado	
January 9	Corta Venas	Eslabon Armado	
January 16	Corta Venas	Eslabon Armado	
January 23	Corta Venas	Eslabon Armado	
January 30	Corta Venas	Eslabon Armado	
February 6	Corta Venas	Eslabon Armado	
February 13	Corta Venas	Eslabon Armado	
February 20	Corta Venas	Eslabon Armado	
February 27	$ad Boyz 4 Life	Junior H	
March 6	Corta Venas	Eslabon Armado	
March 13	Corta Venas	Eslabon Armado	
March 20	Corta Venas	Eslabon Armado	
March 27	Corta Venas	Eslabon Armado	
April 3	Corta Venas	Eslabon Armado	
April 10	Corta Venas	Eslabon Armado	
April 17	Corta Venas	Eslabon Armado	
April 24	Corta Venas	Eslabon Armado	
May 1	Corta Venas	Eslabon Armado	
May 8	AYAYAY!	Christian Nodal	
May 15	Un Azteca En El Azteca, Volumen 2	Vicente Fernández	
May 22	Corridos Tumbados	Natanael Cano	
May 29	Corridos Tumbados	Natanael Cano	
June 5	Corridos Tumbados	Natanael Cano	
June 12	A Mis 20	Natanael Cano	
June 19	A Mis 20	Natanael Cano	
June 26	A Mis 20	Natanael Cano	
July 3	A Mis 20	Natanael Cano	
July 10	Tu Veneno Mortal, Vol. 2	Eslabon Armado	
July 17	Tu Veneno Mortal, Vol. 2	Eslabon Armado	
July 24	Tu Veneno Mortal, Vol. 2	Eslabon Armado	
July 31	Corta Venas	Eslabon Armado	
August 7	Corta Venas	Eslabon Armado	
August 14	Corta Venas	Eslabon Armado	
August 21	Corta Venas	Eslabon Armado	
August 28	Corta Venas	Eslabon Armado	
September 4	Corta Venas	Eslabon Armado	
September 11	Corta Venas	Eslabon Armado	
September 18	Corta Venas	Eslabon Armado	
October 2	Corta Venas	Eslabon Armado	
October 9	Corta Venas	Eslabon Armado	
October 16	Corta Venas	Eslabon Armado	
October 23	Corta Venas	Eslabon Armado	
October 30	Corta Venas	Eslabon Armado	
November 6	Corta Venas	Eslabon Armado	
November 13	Corta Venas	Eslabon Armado	
November 20	Corta Venas	Eslabon Armado	
November 27	Corta Venas	Eslabon Armado	
December 4	Corta Venas	Eslabon Armado	
December 11	Corta Venas	Eslabon Armado	
December 18	Corta Venas	Eslabon Armado	
December 25	Historia de un Ídolo, Vol. 1	Vicente Fernández	
