= Latin Grammy Award for Best Contemporary Mexican Music Album =

- Awarded for: quality vocal or instrumental contemporary regional Mexican music albums
- Country: United States
- Presented by: The Latin Recording Academy
- Currently held by: Xavi for Dosis (2026)
- Website: latingrammy.com

The Latin Grammy Award for Best Contemporary Mexican Music Album is a recent honor presented annually by the Latin Recording Academy at the Latin Grammy Awards, a ceremony that recognizes excellence and promotes a wider awareness of cultural diversity and contributions of Latin recording artists in the United States and globally.

== History ==
The category was introduced alongside Best Latin Electronic Music Performance and was awarded for the first time at the 25th Annual Latin Grammy Awards. It serves as the sixth category from the Regional Mexican field. According to the definition category guide, the award is for albums performed in conjunction with at least three dominant/essential instruments coming from the fusion of genres or subgenres of Regional Mexican music: acoustic guitar, semi-acoustic guitar, 12-string guitar/docerola, electric guitar, accordion, sax or charcheta, bajo sexto/bajo quinto, vihuela, double bass/tololoche, electric bass, acoustic bass/bajoloche, tuba or guitarrón, which maintain or include the rhythmic structure of the ranchero styles, 2/4 polka, bolero, ballad, cumbia, 3/4 waltz or those in 6/8 rhythmic structure such as sones and huapangos, reggae, trap, dembow, hip-hop, rock, country, jazz and pop.

Albums can be vocal or instrumental, with at least 51% of the total time recorded with new material, maintaining at least 60% of the essence of the genres of Regional Mexican music. Albums must have a minimum of 5 tracks/15 minutes where 60% of the songs must have at least 60% lyrics in Spanish. For performances by solo artists, duos or groups.

== Recipients ==
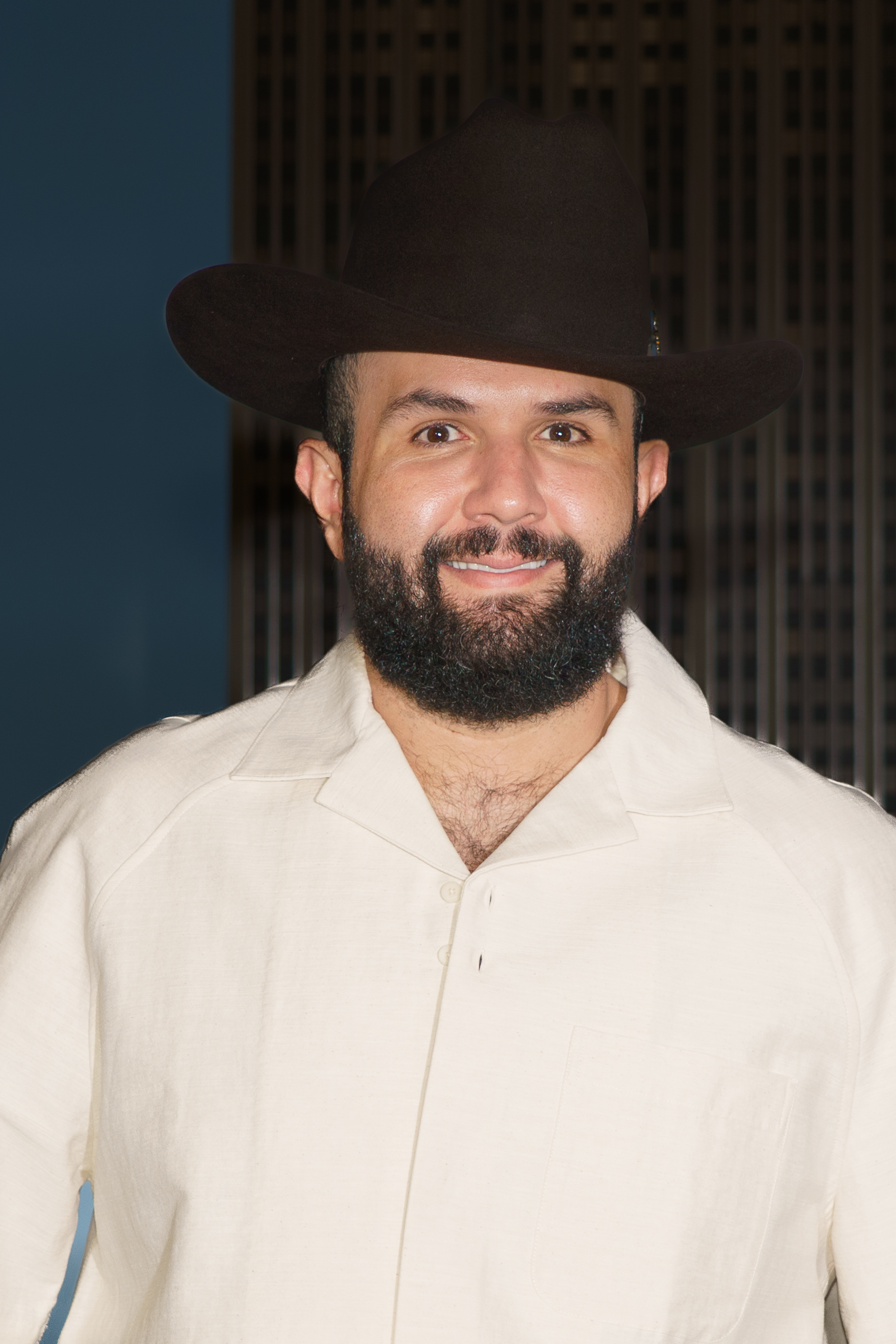
Winner of the first two awards, Carín León.

Year	Artist	Work	Nominees	Ref.
2024	Carín León	Boca Chueca, Vol. 1	Natanael Cano – Nata Montana; DannyLux – EVOLUXION; Grupo Frontera – Jugando a Que No Pasa Nada; Michelle Maciel – Trastornado; Peso Pluma – Génesis	
2025	Carín León	Palabra de To's (Seca)	Iván Cornejo – Mirada; DannyLux – Leyenda; Grupo Firme – Evolución; Tito Double P – Incómodo	
2026	Xavi	Dosis	Kakalo – De Parte Mía; Peso Pluma, Tito Double P – Dinastía (Deluxe); Rivs – Contra Todo; Yahritza y su Esencia – Metamórfosis	
