= Yami Safdie =

Argentine singer (born 1997)

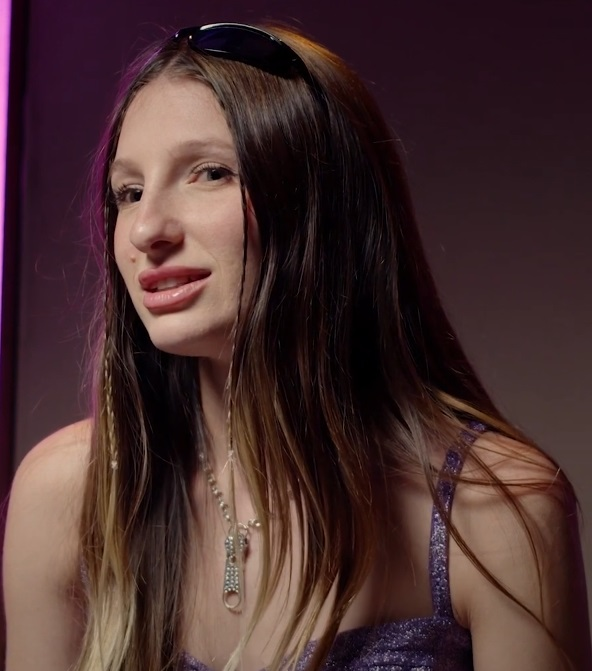
- Safdie in 2025
- Born: Yamila Safdie; 20 October 1997 (age 29); Buenos Aires, Argentina
- Education: Bachelor's Degree in Performing Arts
- Occupations: Singer internet personality
- Years active: 2013–present
- Musical career
- Genres: Reggaeton; Latin pop; Latin trap
- Instrument: Vocals

Yamila Safdie (Haedo, Buenos Aires; October 20, 1997), known professionally as Yami Safdie, is an Argentine singer, internet personality, and songwriter. In 2023, she gained fame in Argentina with her song "De nada," and the following year, she became known across Latin America for her single "En otra vida" in collaboration with Lasso.

== Early life and education ==
From a Jewish family, Safdie began studying singing and musical theater at age nine. During her teenage years, she studied music at the Alberto Ginastera Conservatory and later pursued a degree in Performing Arts. At 19, she began uploading cover songs to her social media accounts, gaining a large audience on platforms like Instagram and TikTok. Between 2018 and 2020, she worked as a children's party entertainer.

== Career ==
In 2021, Safdie signed with the record label Warner Music Group. That year, she released her first original songs, including "Caminar Sola," "Flashear," "FC," and "Pa' Quererme Así."

In early 2022, she released Como Si Na, a collaboration with Lautaro López. This was the first of a series of songs that formed part of her debut album, Dije que no me iba a enamorar.

== Discography ==
=== Studio albums ===
Year	Title
2022	Dije que no me iba a enamorar
2023	Sur
2025	Querida Yo

=== Extended Plays (EPs) ===
Year	Title
2024	Modales
