= Billboard Spirit of Hope Award =

Award to musicians for philanthropy

Spirit of Hope
- Awarded for: "philanthropic and humanitarian contributions beyond their musical work"
- Presented by: Billboard
- First award: 1996
- Currently held by: J Balvin (2024)
- Website: billboard.com/latin

The Billboard Spirit of Hope is an honor that is presented by Billboard magazine to a Latin artist or a group in recognition of their extraordinary philanthropic and humanitarian contributions beyond their musical work." The accolade was established in 1996 in honor of Selena, who died a year earlier. The recipient of the Spirit of Hope is decided by the Billboard editorial committee. The Spirit of Hope Award was first given to Cuban American singer Gloria Estefan.

Since 1996, the Spirit of Hope has been presented during the Billboard Latin Music Awards. The award was not presented in 2012, 2016, 2018, 2019, and 2021.

== Recipients ==
| Year | Image | Recipient | Nationality | Ref. |
|---|---|---|---|---|
| 1996 | | Gloria Estefan | Cuba; United States | |
| 1997 | | Emmanuel | United States | |
| 1998 | | Willy Chirino | Cuba; United States | |
| 1999 | | Olga Tañón | Puerto Rico | |
| 2000 | | Maná | Mexico | |
| 2001 | | Los Tigres del Norte | United States | |
| 2002 | | Ricky Martin | Puerto Rico | |
| 2003 | — | El General | Panama | |
| 2004 | — | Soraya | Colombia | |
| 2005 | | Juan Luis Guerra | Dominican Republic | |
| 2006 | | Shakira | Colombia | |
| 2007 | | Ricardo Montaner | Venezuela | |
| 2008 | | Juanes | Colombia | |
| 2009 | | Daddy Yankee | Puerto Rico | |
| 2010 | | Marc Anthony | United States | |
| 2011 | | Gloria Estefan | Cuba | |
| 2012 | No award | | | |
| 2013 | | Maná | Mexico | |
| 2014 | | Carlos Vives | Colombia | |
| 2015 | | Carlos Santana | United States | |
| 2016 | No award | | | |
| 2017 | | Luis Fonsi | Puerto Rico; United States | |
| 2018 | No award | | | |
| 2019 | No award | | | |
| 2020 | | Maluma | Colombia | |
| 2021 | No award | | | |
| 2022 | | Christina Aguilera | United States | |
| 2023 | | Karol G | Colombia | |
| 2024 | | J Balvin | Colombia | |

== See also ==
- Latin Recording Academy Person of the Year
- List of humanitarian and service awards
