= Eslabón Armado =

American Regional Mexican group

Background information
- Origin: Patterson, California, U.S.
- Genre: Regional Mexican • urban sierreño • corridos tumbados
- Years active: 2017–present
- Members: Pedro Tovar; Brian Tovar; Damián Pacheco
- Past members: Gabriel Hidalgo; Ulises González; Jesse Vargas
- Website: https://eslabonarmadooficial.com

Eslabón Armado is an American regional Mexican group from Patterson, California, formed in 2017. The group's lineup was originally consisted of Pedro Tovar (lead vocals), Brian Tovar (bass), and Jesse Vargas (backing vocals and acoustic guitar) until 2020, when Vargas departed to form his own group. Ulises González (acoustic guitar) and Damián Pacheco (twelve-string guitar) later joined in 2022, with González departing in March 2025.

The group was formed by brothers Pedro and Brian Tovar, along with their friend Gabriel Hidalgo, inspired by their father, who introduced them to sierreño music from northwestern Mexico. Pedro started writing songs at just 10 years old, drawing from his father’s passion and his own love of romantic movies. Despite recording their first album under less-than-ideal garage conditions, Tu Veneno Mortal reached No. 9 on Billboard's Top Latin Albums chart, marking their breakthrough. Their single "Con Tus Besos", which Pedro almost left off the album, became their first entry on Billboard's Hot Latin Songs chart, proving their raw, traditional sound resonated widely. The name "Eslabón Armado," meaning "a united chain," or reflects their bond and collaborative spirit from the start of the band.

For most of their career, the group had a three-piece lineup, consisting of brothers Pedro and Brian Tovar, and their friend Gabriel Hidalgo–all natives of Bay Area, California–while they attended Patterson High School. They graduated to concentrate on the group. They have released seven studio albums and have received several awards and nominations including two Billboard Music Awards, two Billboard Latin Music Awards and two Latin American Music Awards. The Tovar Brothers have been the only two constant members. Hidalgo remained until 2021, when he was replaced by González after deciding to leave after moving to Los Angeles and pursuing other musical projects, with Pacheco joining in 2022.

== Career ==
The group started as a trio in 2017 in Patterson, California, composed of brothers Pedro Tovar and Brian Tovar, alongside their friend Jesse Vargas until 2020, when Vargas departed to form his own group. Shortly after Vargas' departure, Gabriel Hidalgo joined to fill his place . All three still being teenagers, the three began to study and play sierreño music, as well as other regional Mexican genres like norteño. Being influenced by the music listened to by their parents, the trio released several videos of live performances to social media platforms like YouTube and TikTok, gaining attention from record labels. The trio was later discovered by Ángel del Villar and signed to DEL Records, where they released their debut EP Navegando y Flotando in 2019.

In 2020, they released their first singles "Con Tus Besos" and "La Trokita". Both songs entered the Hot Latin Songs chart, peaking at No. 15 and No. 37, respectively. Their debut album Tu Veneno Mortal was released on April 6, 2020. During 2020, the trio released two more albums, Vibras de Noche on July 17 and Corta Venas on December 18. All three albums topped the Regional Mexican Albums chart while the first two were certified platinum in United States. Following the release of the albums, Gabriel Hidalgo left the group.

Their fourth album Tu Veneno Mortal, Vol. 2 was released on June 25, 2021. In September 2021, Ulises González joined the group, making them a trio again. In the same year, "Jugaste y Sufrí", a song with DannyLux, had peaked at No. 69 at the Billboard Hot 100 chart, making this both artists' first appearance on the chart. At the 2021 Billboard Latin Music Awards, the band won Duo/Group Top Latin Albums Artist of the Year and Regional Mexican Album of the Year; the latter for Tu Veneno Mortal, while at the Latin American Music Awards of 2021, they won Favorite Duo or Group and Favorite Regional Mexican Duo or Group.

In early 2022, Damián Pacheco joined the group. On May 5, 2022, the group released Nostalgia, with the addition of Ulises González and Damián Pacheco, both former touring members, to the official lineup. The album was their fifth consecutive No. 1 on the Regional Mexican Albums chart. Additionally, the album peaked at No. 9 at the Billboard 200 chart, becoming the first regional Mexican album to achieve a top 10 position on the chart.

In March 2023, they released the song "Ella Baila Sola" featuring singer and rapper Peso Pluma. The song went viral on TikTok and peaked at No. 4 on the Billboard Hot 100, being their highest appearance on the chart, as well as the first regional Mexican song to enter the top ten on the chart. In addition, the song also topped the Hot Latin Songs chart, being the group's first No. 1 song on the chart. In the following month, the group released their album Desvelado, which was supported by "Ella Baila Sola". The album debuted at No. 6 in the Billboard 200, which marked the second album by the group and in the regional Mexican music genre to debut on the top 10 of the chart, following Nostalgia. In October 2023, they released the song "La Fresa" featuring Gabito Ballesteros. In October 25, the group, along with Ballesteros, performed the song on The Tonight Show Starring Jimmy Fallon, making them the second regional Mexican act to perform on the show, after Peso Pluma's performance of "Ella Baila Sola."

== Members ==
Current members

- Pedro Tovar – lead vocals, twelve-string guitar (2017–present)
- Brian Tovar – bass (2017–present)
- Damián Pacheco – twelve-string guitar (2022–present)
- Cesar Posada - six-string guitar and backup vocals (2026-present)
- Amador Núñez - six-string guitar (2025-present)

Former members

- Jesse Vargas - guitar, backing vocals (2017- 2020)
- Gabriel Hidalgo – guitar, backing vocals (2020–2021)
- Ulises González – acoustic guitar (2021–2025), touring (2019-2021)

== Discography ==
=== Studio albums ===
List of studio albums, with selected details, chart positions, sales, and certifications
Title	Studio album details	Peak chart positions			Certifications
Title	Studio album details	US	US Latin	MEX Reg.	Certifications
Tu Veneno Mortal	Released: April 6, 2020; Label: DEL Records; Format: CD, digital download, streaming	—	7	1	RIAA: Platinum (Latin)
Vibras de Noche	Released: July 17, 2020; Label: DEL Records; Format: CD, digital download, streaming	18	1	1	RIAA: Platinum (Latin)
Corta Venas	Released: December 18, 2020; Label: DEL Records; Format: CD, digital download, streaming	56	2	1	RIAA: 8× Platinum (Latin)
Tu Veneno Mortal, Vol. 2	Released: June 25, 2021; Label: DEL Records; Format: CD, digital download, streaming	132	5	1	RIAA: 3× Platinum (Latin)
Nostalgia	Released: May 6, 2022; Label: DEL Records; Format: CD, digital download, streaming	9	2	1	RIAA: 2× Platinum (Latin)
Desvelado	Released: April 27, 2023; Label: DEL Records; Format: CD, digital download, streaming	6	1	1	
Amor Perdido	Released: October 4, 2024; Label: DEL Records; Format: Digital download, streaming	—	—	—	
Vibras de Noche 2	Released: March 14, 2025; Label: Armado Records; Format: Digital download, streaming	30	4	3	
NOCTURNO	Released: June 26, 2026; Label: Armado Records; Format: Digital download, streaming	—	—	—	

=== Extended plays ===
List of extended plays, with selected details
Title	Album details
Navegando y Flotando	Released: October 11, 2019; Label: DEL Records; Format: Digital download, streaming

=== Singles ===
List of singles as lead artist, with selected chart positions and certifications, showing year released and album name
Title	Year	Peak chart positions					Certifications	Album
Title	Year	US	US Latin	MEX	MEX Reg.	WW	Certifications	Album
"Con Tus Besos"	2020	—	15	29	3	—		Tu Veneno Mortal
"La Trokita"	2020	—	37	—	—	—		Vibras de Noche
"Te Encontré" (with Ulices Chaidez)	2021	—	30	10	1	—		Non-album singles
"Lamento Boliviano"	2021	—	—	—	—	—		Non-album singles
"Entre la Lumbre"	2021	—	—	—	—	—		Non-album singles
"Jugaste y Sufrí" (with DannyLux)	2021	69	3	—	—	111		Corta Venas
"Navidad Sin Ti"	2021	—	—	—	—	—		Non-album single
"Ella Baila Sola" (with Peso Pluma)	2023	4	1	1	1	1	RIAA: 21× Platinum (Latin)	Desvelado
"Quédate Conmigo" (with Grupo Frontera)	2023	— (Note: "Quédate Conmigo" did not enter the Billboard Hot 100, but peaked at number 13 on the Bubbling Under Hot 100 chart.)	25	—	—	—		Desvelado
"La Fresa" (with Gabito Ballesteros)	2023	—	—	—	—	—		Amor Perdido
"Amarte a la Antigua"	2024	—	—	—	—	—		Non-album single
"La Durango" (with Peso Pluma and Junior H)	2024	75	2	5	—	83		Éxodo

=== Other charted songs ===
List of singles as lead artist, with selected chart positions and certifications, showing year released and album name
Title	Year	Peak chart positions		Album
Title	Year	US Bub.	US Latin	Album
"Dame tu Calor"	2020	9	5	Vibras de Noche
"Tal Vez"	2020	—	15	Vibras de Noche
"Ganas Que Te Tengo"	2020	—	22	Vibras de Noche
"Sube al Carro"	2020	—	21	Vibras de Noche
"¿Donde Has Estado?"	2020	—	29	Vibras de Noche
"Tu Canción"	2020	—	46	Vibras de Noche
"24 Horas"	2020	—	47	Vibras de Noche
"Ando Más Que Mal"	2021	—	10	Corta Venas
"La Mejor de Todas"	2021	—	26	Corta Venas
"Mi Historia Entre Tus Dedos"	2021	—	28	Corta Venas
"El Tiempo Nos Cambió"	2021	—	47	Corta Venas
"Regresa Mami"	2021	—	25	Tu Veneno Mortal, Vol. 2
"No Dudes de Ti"	2021	—	45	Tu Veneno Mortal, Vol. 2
"Si Superias" (with DannyLux)	2022	12	27	Nostalgia
"Hasta la Muerte" (with Iván Cornejo)	2022	—	35	Nostalgia
"Vete a la Fregada"	2022	—	31	Nostalgia
"Dos Morritas" (with Junior H)	2022	21	28	Nostalgia
"Modo Depre :("	2022	—	32	Nostalgia
"La Perrié" (with Fuerza Regida)	2022	—	38	Nostalgia
"Luces Rojas"	2022	—	39	Nostalgia
"Mente en Alto"	2022	—	42	Nostalgia
"Solo" (with Erre)	2022	—	43	Nostalgia
"Quien Es El?"	2023	—	33	Desvelado
"Así Lo Quiso Dios" (with Luis R. Conriquez)	2023	6	24	Desvelado
"Mejor Acabar" (with Junior H)	2023	—	50	Desvelado
"Te Odio!"	2025	—	36	Vibras de Noche 2
"Dime"	2025	—	35	Vibras de Noche 2
"Esa Noche" (featuring Macario Martinez)	2025	—	50	Vibras de Noche 2
"Otras 24 Horas"	2025	—	37	Vibras de Noche 2

== Awards and nominations ==
Award	Year	Category	Nominated work	Result	Ref.
American Music Awards	2021	Favorite Duo or Group – Latin	Eslabón Armado	Nominated	
Billboard Music Awards	2021	Top Latin Duo/Group	Eslabón Armado	Won	
Billboard Music Awards	2022	Top Latin Duo/Group	Eslabón Armado	Won	
Billboard Music Awards	2022	Top Latin Album	Corta Venas	Nominated	
Billboard Latin Music Awards	2021	New Artist of the Year	Eslabón Armado	Nominated	
Billboard Latin Music Awards	2021	Duo/Group Hot Latin Songs Artist of the Year	Eslabón Armado	Nominated	
Billboard Latin Music Awards	2021	Duo/Group Top Latin Albums Artist of the Year	Eslabón Armado	Won	
Billboard Latin Music Awards	2021	Regional Mexican Duo/Artist of the Year	Eslabón Armado	Nominated	
Billboard Latin Music Awards	2021	Regional Mexican Album of the Year	Tu Veneno Mortal	Won	
Billboard Latin Music Awards	2021	Regional Mexican Album of the Year	Corta Venas	Nominated	
Billboard Latin Music Awards	2021	Regional Mexican Album of the Year	Vibras de Noche	Nominated	
Billboard Latin Music Awards	2022	Duo/Group Hot Latin Songs Artist of the Year	Eslabón Armado	Nominated	
Billboard Latin Music Awards	2022	Top Latin Albums Artist of the Year, Duo/Group	Eslabón Armado	Won	
Billboard Latin Music Awards	2022	Regional Mexican Artist of the Year, Duo or Group	Eslabón Armado	Won	
Billboard Latin Music Awards	2022	Regional Mexican Song of the Year	"Jugaste y Sufrí" (featuring DannyLux)	Nominated	
Billboard Latin Music Awards	2022	Regional Mexican Album of the Year	Nostalgia	Nominated	
Billboard Latin Music Awards	2022	Regional Mexican Album of the Year	Tu Veneno Mortal, Vol. 2	Nominated	
Billboard Latin Music Awards	2023	Duo/Group Hot Latin Songs Artist of the Year	Eslabón Armado	Nominated	
Billboard Latin Music Awards	2023	Top Latin Albums Artist of the Year, Duo/Group	Eslabón Armado	Nominated	
Billboard Latin Music Awards	2023	Regional Mexican Artist of the Year, Duo or Group	Eslabón Armado	Nominated	
Billboard Latin Music Awards	2023	Global 200 Latin Song of the Year	"Ella Baila Sola" (with Peso Pluma)	Nominated	
Billboard Latin Music Awards	2023	Hot Latin Song of the Year	"Ella Baila Sola" (with Peso Pluma)	Won	
Billboard Latin Music Awards	2023	Hot Latin Song of the Year, Vocal Event	"Ella Baila Sola" (with Peso Pluma)	Won	
Billboard Latin Music Awards	2023	Sales Song of the Year	"Ella Baila Sola" (with Peso Pluma)	Nominated	
Billboard Latin Music Awards	2023	Streaming Song of the Year	"Ella Baila Sola" (with Peso Pluma)	Won	
Billboard Latin Music Awards	2023	Regional Mexican Song of the Year	"Ella Baila Sola" (with Peso Pluma)	Won	
Billboard Latin Music Awards	2023	Regional Mexican Album of the Year	Desvelado	Nominated	
Heat Latin Music Awards	2024	Best Group or Band	Eslabón Armado	Nominated	
iHeartRadio Music Awards	2022	Regional Mexican Album of the Year	Corta Venas	Won	
iHeartRadio Music Awards	2022	Best New Latin Artist	Eslabón Armado	Nominated	
Latin American Music Awards	2021	Artist of the Year	Eslabón Armado	Nominated	
Latin American Music Awards	2021	New Artist of the Year	Eslabón Armado	Nominated	
Latin American Music Awards	2021	Favorite Duo or Group	Eslabón Armado	Won	
Latin American Music Awards	2021	Favorite Regional Mexican Duo or Group	Eslabón Armado	Won	
Latin American Music Awards	2021	Favorite Regional Mexican Album	Tu Veneno Mortal	Nominated	
Latin American Music Awards	2022	Artist of the Year	Eslabón Armado	Nominated	
Latin American Music Awards	2022	Favorite Duo or Group	Eslabón Armado	Nominated	
Latin American Music Awards	2022	Favorite Regional Mexican Duo or Group	Eslabón Armado	Nominated	
Latin American Music Awards	2022	Album of the Year	Corta Venas	Nominated	
Latin American Music Awards	2022	Favorite Regional Mexican Album	Corta Venas	Nominated	
Latin American Music Awards	2023	Artist of the Year	Eslabón Armado	Nominated	
Latin American Music Awards	2023	Favorite Regional Mexican Duo or Group	Eslabón Armado	Nominated	
Latin American Music Awards	2023	Best Collaboration – Regional Mexican	"Jugaste y Sufrí" (featuring DannyLux)	Nominated	
Latin American Music Awards	2023	Album of the Year	Nostalgia	Nominated	
Latin American Music Awards	2023	Favorite Regional Mexican Album	Nostalgia	Nominated	
Latin American Music Awards	2024	Artist of the Year	Eslabón Armado	Nominated	
Latin American Music Awards	2024	Streaming Artist of the Year	Eslabón Armado	Nominated	
Latin American Music Awards	2024	Favorite Regional Mexican Duo or Group	Eslabón Armado	Nominated	
Latin American Music Awards	2024	Song of the Year	"Ella Baila Sola" (with Peso Pluma)	Nominated	
Latin American Music Awards	2024	Global Latin Song of the Year	"Ella Baila Sola" (with Peso Pluma)	Nominated	
Latin American Music Awards	2024	Best Collaboration - Regional Mexican	"Ella Baila Sola" (with Peso Pluma)	Won	
Latin American Music Awards	2024	Album of the Year	Desvelado	Nominated	
Latin American Music Awards	2024	Favorite Regional Mexican Album	Desvelado	Nominated	
Latin Grammy Awards	2023	Song of the Year	"Ella Baila Sola" (with Peso Pluma)	Nominated	
Latin Grammy Awards	2023	Best Regional Mexican Song	"Ella Baila Sola" (with Peso Pluma)	Nominated	
Los 40 Music Awards	2023	Best Latin Song	"Ella Baila Sola" (with Peso Pluma)	Nominated	
Los 40 Music Awards	2023	Best Latin Collaboration	"Ella Baila Sola" (with Peso Pluma)	Nominated	
MTV Millennial Awards	2023	Viral Anthem	"Ella Baila Sola" (with Peso Pluma)	Nominated	
MTV Millennial Awards	2023	Global Hit of the Year	"Ella Baila Sola" (with Peso Pluma)	Nominated	
MTV Video Music Awards	2023	Best Latin	"Ella Baila Sola" (with Peso Pluma)	Nominated	
Premios Juventud	2021	Viral Track of the Year	"Con Tus Besos"	Nominated	
Premios Juventud	2021	The New Generation – Regional Mexican	Eslabón Armado	Nominated	
Premios Juventud	2022	Best Regional Mexican Collaboration	"Te Encontré" (with Ulices Chaidez)	Nominated	
Premios Juventud	2023	Favorite Group or Duo of The Year	Eslabón Armado	Nominated	
Premios Juventud	2023	Best Regional Mexican Song	"Ella Baila Sola" (with Peso Pluma)	Won	
Premios Lo Nuestro	2021	Regional Mexican – Sierreña Song of the Year	"Con Tus Besos"	Nominated	
Premios Lo Nuestro	2022	Regional Mexican – Sierreña Song of the Year	"Te Encontré" (with Ulices Chaidez)	Nominated	
Premios Lo Nuestro	2024	Regional Mexican Group or Duo of the Year	Eslabón Armado	Nominated	
Premios Lo Nuestro	2024	Regional Mexican New Artist of the Year	Eslabón Armado	Nominated	
Premios Lo Nuestro	2024	Song of the Year	"Ella Baila Sola" (with Peso Pluma)	Nominated	
Premios Lo Nuestro	2024	Regional Mexican Song of the Year	"Ella Baila Sola" (with Peso Pluma)	Won	
Premios Lo Nuestro	2024	Regional Mexican Collaboration of the Year	"Ella Baila Sola" (with Peso Pluma)	Nominated	
Premios Lo Nuestro	2024	Regional Mexican Fusion Song of the Year	"Ella Baila Sola" (with Peso Pluma)	Won	
Premios Lo Nuestro	2024	Regional Mexican Album of the Year	Desvelado	Nominated	
Premios Tu Música Urbano	2023	Top Artist – Regional Mexican Urban	Eslabón Armado	Won	
