= Yng Lvcas =

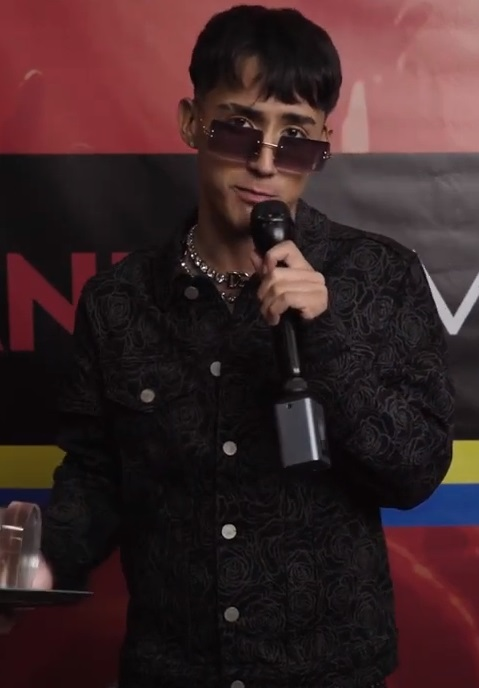
- Yng Lvcas in 2023

Background information
- Born: Daniel Oswaldo Donlucas Martínez; 24 October 1999 (age 26); Guadalajara, Jalisco, Mexico
- Genres: Corridos; hip hop; reggaetón; Latin trap
- Occupations: Singer-songwriter; rapper
- Instrument: Vocals

Daniel Oswaldo Donlucas Martínez (born 24 October 1999), known professionally at Yng Lvcas, is a Mexican singer-songwriter and rapper known for corridos and reggaeton music. His 2023 remix of "La Bebé" with Peso Pluma charted number 11 on the Billboard Hot 100.

== Early life ==
Donlucas was born on 24 October 1999 in Guadalajara, Jalisco.

== Career ==
In 2021, he released Wup? Mixtape1, an eight-track extended play with corridos. Later in 2021, he released LPM featuring reggaeton songs including "La Bebé." The song went viral on TikTok. Donlucas released a remix with French producer David Guetta and Mexican rapper Peso Pluma in March 2023. The song reached number 12 on the Billboard Hot 100 the following month.

== Tours ==
- RUMBAZO 2024

== Discography ==
=== Studio albums ===
- Super Estrellas (2023)

=== EPs ===
- Taka Taka Mixtape (2022)
- Puerqueo EP (2022)
- Six Jewels 23 (2023)

=== Mixtapes ===
- Wup? Mixtape1 (2021)
- LPM (2021)

=== Singles ===
- La Bebé (2021)
