= Pedro Tovar =

American singer

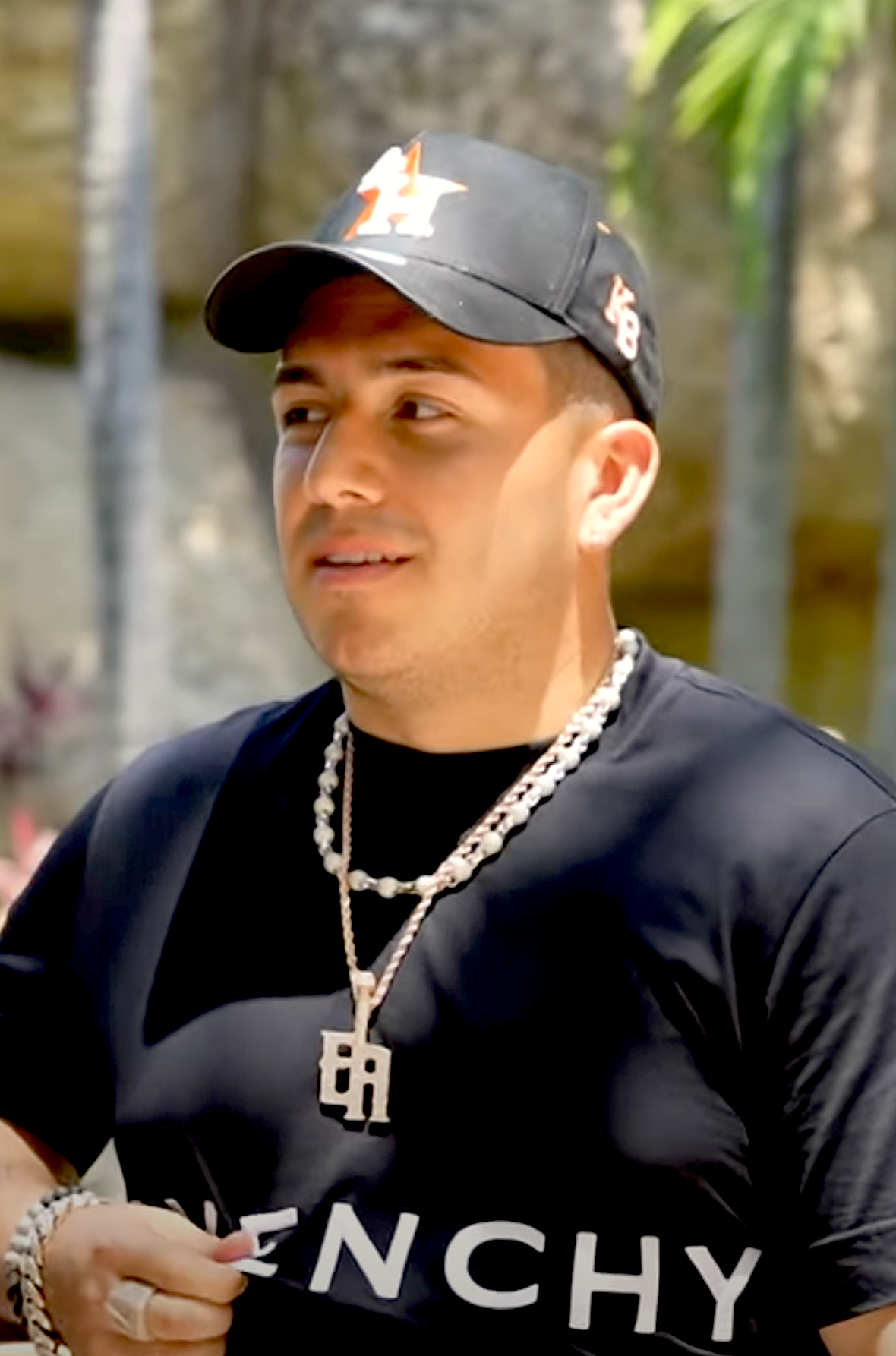
- Tovar in 2023

Background information
- Born: Pedro Julian Tovar Jr. July 22, 2002 (age 24); Los Angeles, California, U.S.
- Origin: Patterson, California, U.S.
- Genres: Regional Mexican
- Occupations: Singer; songwriter
- Member of: Eslabón Armado

Pedro Julian Tovar Jr. (born July 22, 2002) is an American singer of regional Mexican music. He is the lead vocalist, founding member, and primary songwriter for the Patterson, California sierreño band Eslabón Armado, along with his brother Brian Tovar. In 2021 and 2022, Eslabón Armado was the winner of the Billboard Music Awards in the category, Top Latin Dúo/Group and Regional Mexican Artist of the Year – Duo or Group.

In 2023 he participated in the single "Ella Baila Sola", in collaboration with Peso Pluma, It was positioned on the global list, and on Billboard's hot 100, and It peaked at number 4 and also managed to Hot Latin Songs for several weeks. It was certified multi-platinum by the Recording Industry Association of America (RIAA).

== Life and career ==
Pedro Julian Tovar Jr. was born in Los Angeles, California on July 22, 2002, and grew up in Patterson, California. In April 2023, Tovar participated in the song "Ella Baila Sola" together with the Mexican singer Peso Pluma, distributed by the DEL Records, record label, performed in the regional Mexican music genre. It was positioned on the global list, and on Billboard's hot 100.

Eslabon Armado started as a trio in 2017, made up of brothers Pedro and Brian Tovar, along with their friend Jesse Vargas. While still teenagers, the three began studying and playing Sierra music, as well as other regional Mexican genres such as Norteño. Influenced by the music their parents listened to, the trio released several live performance videos on YouTube and other social media platforms such as TikTok, attracting the attention of various record labels. The trio was later discovered by Ángel del Villar and signed with the company DEL Records.

In 2021, Eslabón Armado was the winner of the Billboard Music Awards, in the category, Top Latin Dúo/Group, and in Premios Juventud 2023 in the category: best song – regional Mexican music.
