= DEL Records =

American Spanish language record label

- Founded: 2009 (16 years ago)
- Founder: Angel Del Villar
- Status: Active
- Distributor: Independent
- Genre: Regional Mexican
- Country of origin: Mexico
- Location: Los Angeles, California
- Official website: www.delrecords.com

DEL Records is an American Spanish language record label founded by Angel Del Villar in 2009. Its headquarters is in Bell Gardens, California, and includes DEL Records, DEL Publishing, DEL Studios and DEL Entertainment, all of which focus on regional Mexican music, specifically with genres from Mexico's pacific states such as banda, Pacific-style norteño, norteño-banda, sierreño, sierreño-banda and mariachi. DEL Records has launched the careers of chart-topping artists like Gerardo Ortíz, Luis Coronel, Ulices Chaidez y Sus Plebes, and Régulo Caro. DEL Records and its artists are frequent winners at the Billboard Latin Music Awards including five in 2017. In seven years, DEL's sales, touring and content development divisions lead and transform the genre. DEL boasts 3 platinum and 9 gold records, and more than 10 #1 singles, as well as #1 albums. DEL Records’ artist tours every week of the year, with over 200 live concert dates in the US and Mexico.

== History ==
The label was formed by Angel who previously ran a fencing company. The label's first signing was with Gerardo Ortíz in 2010. Originally, DEL Records had a partnership with Anaheim, California, based VIP Music. The label is currently distributed Independently.

In April 2015, DEL Records donated $12,200 to the Rowland Unified School District in Rowland Heights, California in order to help with their area student and teacher scholarships.

In 2016, DEL Records received six Billboard Latin Music Awards including those for Regional Mexican Airplay Label of the Year, Regional Mexican Airplay Imprint of the Year and Regional Mexican Albums Imprint of the Year.

On April 14, 2016, the label entered into a partnership with Combate Americas, the first-ever U.S. Hispanic mixed martial arts sports franchise. The premier event was April 18, 2016 for NBC Universo's fight series, Road to the Championship. Regulo Caro and King Lil G walked the MMA fighters to the cage and also performed later in the night. Also in 2016, DEL Records partnered with local and national organizations to launch "Shut Up the Haters and Vote," which encouraged high school students of eligible age to register to vote.

Two years after the death of their artist Ariel Camacho, DEL Records released on February 24, 2017, a tribute album of duets with other artists on the label such as Gerardo Ortiz, Luis Coronel and Regulo Caro. Ariel Camacho Para Siempre Duetos, Vol.1 includes a 15-minute DVD of unreleased footage of Camacho. Los Plebes del Rancho de Ariel Camacho, the group formed after the singer's death from his band, received eight 2017 Billboard Latin Music Award nominations, and won three of them.

DEL Records received five Billboard Latin Music Awards in 2017, among them Top Latin Albums Artist of the Year, Duo or Group and Regional Mexican Songs Artist of the Year Erick Hernandez.

== Artists ==
=== Current ===
- Los del Limit
- Emanuel Garcia
- Lenin Ramirez

=== Former ===
- Ariel Camacho y los Plebes del Rancho (2013–2015)
- Gerardo Ortíz (2008– 2018)
- Luis Coronel (2012–2016)
- Régulo Caro (2009–2016)
- King Lil G
- Noel Torres (2010–2013)
- Nena Guzman (2011–2014)
- Eslabon Armado (2020–2024)
- Los Del Limit (2020–2024)
- Revolver Cannabis (2011–2018)

== Awards ==
Year	Award	Category	Recipient
2017	Billboard Latin Music Awards	Publisher of the Year	DEL World Songs, ASCAP
2017	Billboard Latin Music Awards	Top Latin Albums of the Year, Duo or Group	Los Plebes del Rancho de Ariel Camacho
2017	Billboard Latin Music Awards	Regional Mexican Songs Artist of the Year, Solo	Gerardo Ortiz
2017	Billboard Latin Music Awards	Regional Mexican Album of the Year	Los Plebes del Rancho de Ariel Camacho Recuerden Mi Estilo
2017	Billboard Latin Music Awards	Regional Mexican Albums Artist of the Year, Duo or Group	Los Plebes del Rancho de Ariel Camacho
2016	Billboard Latin Music Awards	Regional Mexican Album of the Year	Gerardo Ortiz Hoy Más Fuerte
2016	Billboard Latin Music Awards	New Artist of the Year	Ariel Camacho y Los Plebes del Rancho
2016	Billboard Latin Music Awards	Regional Mexican Song of the Year	Ariel Camacho y Los Plebes del Rancho “Te Metiste”
2015	Billboard Latin Music Awards	Regional Mexican Songs Artist of the Year, Solo	Gerardo Ortiz
2014	Billboard Latin Music Awards	New Artist of the Year	Luis Coronel
2014	Billboard Latin Music Awards	Regional Mexican Songs Artist of the Year, Solo	Gerardo Ortiz
2013	Billboard Latin Music Awards	Regional Mexican Songs Artist of the Year, Solo	Gerardo Ortiz
2012	Billboard Latin Music Awards	Regional Mexican Songs Artist of the Year, Solo	Gerardo Ortiz
2012	Billboard Latin Music Awards	Regional Mexican Albums Artist of the Year, Solo	Gerardo Ortiz

== Discography ==
Year	Album	Artist
2017	Prohibido el Amor	Gabriel Diaz
2017	"La Ruleta Sigue Girando"	Revolver Cannabis
2017	Imponiendo Estilo, Vol.4	Los Del Arroyo
2017	Ariel Camacho Para Siempre	Ariel Camacho y Los Plebes del Rancho
2017	Para Siempre, Vol.1	Ariel Camacho y los Plebes del Rancho
2016	Navidad Con DEL	Various
2016	Caos En Las Calles	Grupo Fernandez
2016	El Secreto de la Fama	Escolta De Guerra
2016	Hoy Mas Fuerte	Gerardo Ortiz
2016	Recuerden Mi Estilo	Los Plebes del Rancho de Ariel Camacho
2016	Alto Al Fuego	Traviezoz de la Zierra
2016	Andamos en el Ruedo	Ulices Chaide y Sus Plebes
2016	DEL Radio Hits	Various
2016	En Estos Dias	Regulo Caro
2016	Lost In Smoke 2	King Lil G
2016	Recurden Mi Estilo	Ariel Camacho/Ariel Camacho y los Plebes del Rancho
2015	A Ver Que Opinan	Traviezoz de la Zierra
2015	Amos del Terror	Revolver Cannabis
2015	DEL Negociante	Ariel Camacho y los Plebes del Rancho
2015	Mi Guitarra Y Yo, Vol.1	Régulo Caro
2015	Los Inicios	Gerardo Ortíz
2015	La Pasadita	Gerardo Ortíz
2015	Los Dias de Ayer	Traviezoz de la Zierra
2015	Mi Conquista	Lenin Ramírez
2015	Mi Guitarra y Yo, Vol. 2	Régulo Caro
2015	Termina de Aceptarlo	Banda Culiacancito
2015	Así Es Mi Cartel	Traviezoz de la Zierra
2015	El Shaka	Los Migueles
2015	Siempre Firme	Lenin Ramirez
2014	Balas, Rosas y Plomo	Revolver Cannabis
2014	Hablemos	Ariel Camacho/Ariel Camacho y los Plebes del Rancho
2014	Corridos Autorizados En Vivo	Los Chairez
2014	El Karma	Ariel Camacho/Ariel Camacho y los Plebes del Rancho
2014	Quiero Ser Tu Dueño	Luis Coronel
2014	60 Segundos	Nena Guzman
2014	Senzu-Rah	Regulo Caro
2014	La Vida Ruina	Marca Registrada
2014	El Amor No Muere, Cambia De Lugar	Alex Rivera
2014	Apoco Tambien	Alex Rivera
2014	El C.G. 55	Parranderos de Medianoche
2014	La Iniciativa	Nena Guzman
2014	Sera O No Sera (La Captura Del Chapo)	Los Parranderos De Media Noche
2014	Vamos A Ganar	Ariel Camacho/Regulo Caro/Luis Coronel/El Gavachillo
2013	Con la Frente en Alto	Luis Coronel
2013	DE Ella Me Enamore	Jeovanni El Empresario
2013	Especialista	Regulo Caro
2013	La Estructura	Noel Torres
2013	Las Que Les Gustan a Los Vieiones Vol.2: En Vivo Con Tololoche	Revolver Cannabis
2013	30 Minutos	Los Chairez
2013	Amado Carrillo	Gerardo Ortiz
2013	Mi Niña Traviesa	Luis Coronel
2013	Con Todo, Por Todo Y Contra Todo	Los Chairez
2013	De Tijuana para el Mundo	Nena Guzman
2013	El Enfiestado	Komando Negro
2013	Prendiendo el Motor	Otra Nivel
2013	Mi Historia	Jeovanni El Empresario
2013	Revolucion DEL Records, Vol.1	Various
2013	Escapate	Luis Coronel
2013	Solo Detalles	Luis Coronel/Alex Rivera
2013	El Escudo Del Chavo	Regulo Caro/Grupo 360
2013	Plan B	Traviezoz de la Zierra
2013	Somos Ajenos	Luis Coronel/Nena Guzman
2013	Subiendo Escalones	Komando Negro
2013	Vete	Komando Negro
2013	Voy a Pistearme el Dolor	Régulo Caro
2012	Adivina	Noel Torres
2012	Amor en Tiempos de Guerra	Régulo Caro
2012	Te Declaro la Guerra	Nena Guzman
2012	DEL Records Presents Nueva Era Del Amor	Various
2012	No Pasa Nada	Grupo Escolta
2012	Soldado Imperial	Los Chairez
2011	Con Las Pilas Activadas	Erik Estrada/Erik Estrada y Sus Mal Portados
2011	DEL Records Presenta: Enfermedad Masiva, Vol.2	Various
2011	Dime La Razón	Alex Rivera
2011	En Vivo Desde Culiacan	Banda Culiacancito
2011	Haciendo Historia	Los Bohemios De Sinaloa
2011	La Interesada	Gatilleros de Culiacán
2011	Morir y Existir: En Vivo	Gerardo Ortiz
2011	Musica Polvora y Sangre	Regulo Caro
2011	Soy Un Antrax	El General
2011	Y Este 'Si' Es Grupo Escolta	Grupo Escolta
2011	Y Se Siente El Contrapeso	Luis y Ramon
2011	Amor Confuso	Gerardo Ortiz
2011	Dime La Razon	Alex Rivera
2010	Ni Hoy Ni Mañana	Gerardo Ortiz
