= Peso Pluma discography =

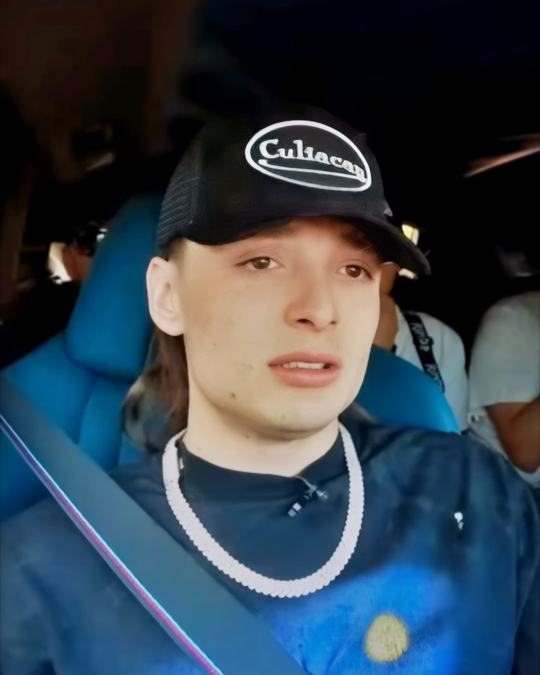
- Peso Pluma in 2023
- Studio albums: 4
- EPs: 1
- Live albums: 2
- Singles: 59

The discography of Mexican singer and rapper Peso Pluma consists of four studio albums, two live albums, one extended play, and 59 singles. After departing from the independent label El Cartel de Los Ángeles in late 2021, he would join the Prajin Parlay label and collaborate with label-mate Raúl Vega on the song "El Bélicon", which was released on 4 February 2022. It appeared on the US Hot Latin Songs chart at number 34, becoming Peso Pluma's first entry on the chart.

On 20 April 2022, to purposely coincide with the number 420, he would release his debut EP Sembrando along with its accompanying single of the same name. After releasing "30 Tiros" in June of the same year, he would then collaborate with fellow singer Luis R. Conriquez to release "Siempre Pendientes" on 15 August 2022. After the single was released, it attained controversy for its lyrics, which praise Mexican drug lord Joaquín "El Chapo" Guzmán and contains a mention of his son Iván Archivaldo Guzmán Salazar. Further escalating its controversy, its music video, which attained 2 million views in its first 24 hours, was also removed from YouTube due to public outrage. The release of "AMG" with Natanael Cano and Gabito Ballesteros led to Peso Pluma's rise in worldwide prominence, debuting on the US Billboard Hot 100. The song lyrically revolves around the Mercedes-AMG G 63 6x6 truck.

After achieving his first song to appear on the Billboard Hot 100, Peso Pluma gained fame within Latin music at the start of 2024, collaborating again with Cano on "PRC", which peaked at number 33 on the chart. After again attaining similar success with collaborations with Junior H on "El Azul" and Fuerza Regida on "Igualito a Mi Apá", which peaked at numbers 55 and 80 on the Hot 100, respectively, the singer simultaneously released two collaborative songs on 17 March 2023, "Ella Baila Sola" with Eslabon Armado and "La Bebé (Remix)" with Yng Lvcas. The pair became hits in the United States, peaking at numbers four and 11 on the Hot 100, respectively, and also reached peaks on the top two of the Billboard Global 200, with the former peaking atop the chart. For the former, it became the first regional Mexican song to peak within the top 10 of the Hot 100 and the first to peak atop the Global 200.

Later releasing "Chanel" with Becky G and the solo song "Bye", he announced his third studio album Génesis, which contained further collaborations with Junior H and Natanael Cano. Released on 22 June 2023, it debuted at number three on the Billboard 200 with 73,000 album-equivalent units, making it the highest debut for a regional Mexican album in the chart's history. From the album, the hit single "Lady Gaga" with Junior H and Gabito Ballesteros peaked atop the US Hot Latin Songs, as well as number 35 on the Hot 100.

== Albums ==
=== Studio albums ===
List of studio albums, with selected details and chart positions
Title	Details	Peak chart positions				Certifications
Title	Details	SPA	US	US Latin	US Reg. Mex.	Certifications
Ah y Qué?	Released: 20 April 2020; Label: El Cartel de los Ángeles; Formats: Digital download, streaming	—	—	—	—	
Efectos Secundarios	Released: 19 March 2021; Label: El Cartel de los Ángeles; Formats: Digital download, streaming	—	—	—	—	
Génesis	Released: 22 June 2023; Label: Double P; Formats: Digital download, streaming	31	3	1	1	AMPROFON: Diamond+Platinum+Gold; RIAA: 3× Platinum
Éxodo	Released: 20 June 2024; Label: Double P; Formats: Digital download, streaming	68	5	1	1	AMPROFON: 2× Platinum+Gold; RIAA: 3× Diamond (Latin)
"—" denotes a recording that did not chart or was not released in that territory.

=== Collaborative studio albums ===
List of collaborative albums, with selected details
Title	Details	Peak chart positions			Certifications
Title	Details	US	US Latin	US Reg. Mex.	Certifications
Dinastía (with Tito Double P)	Released: 25 December 2025; Label: Double P; Formats: Digital download, streaming	6	1	1	RIAA: Diamond (Latin)

=== Live albums ===
List of live albums, with selected details
Title	Details
Disco en Vivo	Released: 21 February 2020; Label: El Cartel de los Ángeles; Formats: Digital download, streaming
Disco en Vivo, Vol. 2	Released: 4 July 2020; Label: El Cartel de los Ángeles; Formats: Digital download, streaming

== Extended plays ==
List of extended plays, with selected details
Title	Details	Peak chart positions	
Title	Details	US Latin	US Reg. Mex.
Sembrando	Released: 20 April 2022; Label: Prajin Records; Formats: Digital download, streaming	48	13

== Singles ==
List of singles, with selected chart positions, and album name
Title	Year	Peak chart positions										Certifications	Album
Title	Year	MEX	ARG	BOL	COL	ECU	PER	SPA	US	US Latin	WW	Certifications	Album
"Jeraqui De Nivel (En Vivo)"	2020	—	—	—	—	—	—	—	—	—	—		Non-album single
"Relajado Voy" (with Decreto Real)	2020	—	—	—	—	—	—	—	—	—	—		Ah y Qué?
"Mil Historias" (with Hector Rubio)	2020	—	—	—	—	—	—	—	—	—	—		Efectos Secundarios
"Con Dinero Baila el Perro"	2020	—	—	—	—	—	—	—	—	—	—		Efectos Secundarios
"Lo Que Me Das"	2021	—	—	—	—	—	—	—	—	—	—		Efectos Secundarios
"Por Las Noches" (solo or remix with Nicki Nicole)	2021	5	72	16	24	14	—	—	28	4	14	AMPROFON: 2× Platinum	Non-album singles
"Todo Es Playa"	2021	—	—	—	—	—	—	—	—	—	—		Non-album singles
"Spiral"	2021	—	—	—	—	—	—	—	—	—	—		Sembrando
"El Belicón" (with Raul Vega)	2022	—	—	—	—	—	—	—	—	34	—	AMPROFON: 3× Platinum; RIAA: 8× Platinum (Latin)	Non-album single
"Sembrando"	2022	—	—	—	—	—	—	—	—	—	—		Sembrando
"Sentosa" (with Tornillo and Polo Gonzalez)	2022	—	—	—	—	—	—	—	—	—	—	RIAA: 2× Platinum (Latin)	Non-album singles
"30 Tiros"	2022	—	—	—	—	—	—	—	—	—	—		Non-album singles
"Siempre Pendientes" (with Luis R. Conriquez)	2022	9	—	—	—	—	—	—	— (Note: "Siempre Pendientes" did not enter the Billboard Hot 100, but peaked at number 11 on the Bubbling Under Hot 100 chart.)	27	174	AMPROFON: 4× Platinum; RIAA: 5× Platinum (Latin)	Non-album singles
"El Gavilán" (with Luis R. Conriquez and Tony Aguirre)	2022	15	—	—	—	—	—	—	—	34	—	RIAA: Platinum (Latin)	Non-album singles
"Ando Enfocado" (with Codiciado and Jaziel Avilez)	2022	—	—	—	—	—	—	—	—	33	—	RIAA: Diamond (Latin)	Y Lo Que Falta
"AMG" (with Natanael Cano and Gabito Ballesteros)	2022	1	—	24	18	15	—	—	37	6	20	RIAA: 7× Platinum (Latin)	Nata Montana
"Delivery" (with Alemán)	2022	—	—	—	—	—	—	—	—	—	—		Non-album single
"Igualito a Mi Apá" (with Fuerza Regida)	2022	20	—	—	—	—	—	—	80	16	118	AMPROFON: 4× Platinum	Pa Que Hablen
"PRC" (with Natanael Cano)	2023	2	—	18	23	20	—	—	33	4	15	AMPROFON: 2× Diamond+2× Platinum+Gold; RIAA: 4× Platinum (Latin)	Génesis
"El Azul" (with Junior H)	2023	3	—	—	—	—	—	—	55	10	23	RIAA: 42× Platinum (Latin)	Non-album singles
"El Hechizo" (with Ovy on the Drums)	2023	—	—	—	—	—	—	—	—	38	—	RIAA: 2× Platinum (Latin)	Non-album singles
"Ella Baila Sola" (with Eslabón Armado)	2023	1	10	2	1	3	6	10	4	1	1	FIMI: Gold; PROMUSICAE: 3× Platinum; RIAA: 21× Platinum (Latin)	Desvelado
"La Bebé" (remix) (with Yng Lvcas)	2023	1	3	3	1	1	2	14	11	2	2	AMPROFON: 3× Diamond; PROMUSICAE: 3× Platinum; RIAA: 13× Platinum (Latin)	Six Jewels 23
"Chanel" (with Becky G)	2023	9	—	—	—	—	—	—	55	8	46	AMPROFON: 4× Platinum+Gold; RIAA: Platinum	Esquinas
"Las Morras" (with Blessd)	2023	17	—	—	15	—	—	—	— (Note: "Las Morras" did not enter the Billboard Hot 100, but peaked at number two on the Bubbling Under Hot 100 chart.)	20	97	AMPROFON: 4× Platinum+Gold	Génesis
"El Tsurito" (with Junior H and Gabito Ballesteros)	2023	15	—	—	—	—	—	—	— (Note: "El Tsurito" did not enter the Billboard Hot 100, but peaked at number six on the Bubbling Under Hot 100 chart.)	23	127	RIAA: 17× Platinum (Latin)	Non-album single
"Rosa Pastel" (with Jasiel Nuñez)	2023	19	—	—	—	—	—	—	93	20	123	AMPROFON: Diamond+Platinum+Gold; RIAA: 11× Platinum (Latin)	Génesis
"77" (with Eladio Carrión)	2023	—	—	—	—	—	—	—	— (Note: "77" did not enter the Billboard Hot 100, but peaked at number six on the Bubbling Under Hot 100 chart.)	27	—	AMPROFON: Platinum+Gold	Génesis
"Bye"	2023	9	—	—	—	—	—	—	48	7	45	AMPROFON: Diamond	Génesis
"Peso Pluma: Bzrp Music Sessions, Vol. 55" (with Bizarrap)	2023	1	3	2	9	4	5	3	31	5	2	PROMUSICAE: Platinum; RIAA: 28× Platinum (Latin)	Non-album single
"Plebada" (with El Alfa)	2023	—	—	—	—	—	—	—	68	12	129		El Rey del Dembow
"Tulum" (with Grupo Frontera)	2023	6	64	4	—	—	—	—	43	6	25	AMPROFON: Diamond+2× Platinum+Gold	Génesis
"Lagunas" (with Jasiel Nuñez)	2023	23	—	—	—	—	—	—	77	16	109	AMPROFON: 2×Diamond+3× Platinum+Gold; RIAA: 31× Platinum (Latin)	Génesis
"Quema" (with Ryan Castro and SOG)	2023	—	—	—	6	15	—	—	92	21	101	AMPROFON: Diamond+Platinum+Gold; PROMUSICAE: Gold; RIAA: 17× Platinum (Latin)	El Cantante del Ghetto
"Lady Gaga" (with Gabito Ballesteros and Junior H)	2023	1	—	24	—	17	—	—	35	1	13	AMPROFON: 3× Diamond+2× Platinum; RIAA: 5× Diamond (Latin)	Génesis
"Feria en el Sobre" (with Gera MX and Herencia de Patrones)	2023	—	—	—	—	—	—	—	—	—	—	AMPROFON: Gold; RIAA: Gold (Latin)	Mustang 65'
"Ojos Azules" (with Blessd and SOG)	2023	—	—	—	13	—	—	—	—	46	—	RIAA: 2× Platinum (Latin)	Si Sabe
"Ex-Special" (with Jhayco)	2023	—	—	—	—	—	—	58	— (Note: "Ex-Special" did not enter the Billboard Hot 100, but peaked at number 14 on the Bubbling Under Hot 100 chart.)	22	—	RIAA: 4× Platinum (Latin)	Le Clique: Vida Rockstar (X)
"Qlona" (with Karol G)	2023	3	17	2	1	1	2	7	28	1	7	FIMI: Gold; PROMUSICAE: 5× Platinum	Mañana Será Bonito (Bichota Season)
"Bipolar" (with Jasiel Nuñez and Junior H)	2023	12	—	—	—	—	—	—	60	7	86		La Odisea
"La Chamba" (with Arcángel)	2023	—	—	—	—	—	—	—	—	50	—		Sentimiento, Elegancia y Más Maldad
"Peligro"	2023	—	—	—	—	—	—	—	—	31	—		Non-album single
"Una Bala" (with Milo J)	2023	—	29	19	—	—	—	—	—	—	— (Note: "Una Bala" did not enter the Billboard Global 200, but peaked at number 171 on the Billboard Global Excl. US chart.)	AMPROFON: Gold	111
"Bellakeo" (with Anitta)	2023	6	21	1	18	5	2	59	53	3	7	AMPROFON: 4× Platinum; PROMUSICAE: Gold; RIAA: 38× Platinum (Latin)	Éxodo
"Rompe la Dompe" (with Junior H and Óscar Maydon)	2023	4	—	—	—	—	—	—	81	12	51	AMPROFON: 3× Platinum+Gold	Éxodo
"La Intención" (with Christian Nodal)	2024	9	—	—	—	—	—	—	92	13	96	AMPROFON: 3× Platinum+Gold; RIAA: 7× Platinum (Latin)	Pa'l Cora Ep. 01
"Igual que un Ángel" (with Kali Uchis)	2024	3	—	20	—	15	12	—	22	1	9	AMPROFON: Diamond+2× Platinum+Gold; RIAA: Platinum	Orquídeas
"A Tu Manera" (with Junior H)	2024	11	—	—	—	—	—	—	— (Note: "A Tu Manera" did not enter the Billboard Hot 100, but peaked at number three on the Bubbling Under Hot 100 chart.)	12	128	RIAA: 4× Platinum (Latin)	Non-album singles
"No Son Klle" (with Santa Fe Klan and Duki)	2024	—	—	—	—	—	—	—	—	40	—		Non-album singles
"La People II" (with Tito Double P and Joel de la P)	2024	4	—	—	—	—	—	—	69	2	34	AMPROFON: 3× Platinum+Gold; RIAA: 18× Diamond (Latin)	Éxodo
"Humo" (with Chencho Corleone)	2024	—	—	—	—	—	—	—	—	28	—	RIAA: 2× Platinum (Latin)	Solo
"Peso Completo" (with Arcángel)	2024	—	—	—	—	—	—	—	—	42	—	AMPROFON: Gold	Éxodo
"Teka" (with DJ Snake)	2024	—	—	—	—	—	—	—	—	28	—		Éxodo
"La Durango" (with Eslabón Armado and Junior H)	2024	5	—	—	—	—	—	—	75	2	83	AMPROFON: 2× Platinum	Éxodo
"Sin Yolanda" (with Gabito Ballesteros)	2024	—	—	—	—	—	—	—	—	20	—		The GB
"Gimme a Second" (Note: "Gimme a Second" is also included on Rich the Kid's album Life's a Gamble.) (with Rich the Kid)	2024	—	—	—	—	—	—	—	—	—	—		Éxodo
"Vino Tinto" (with Natanael Cano and Gabito Ballesteros)	2024	3	—	—	—	—	—	—	91	5	96	AMPROFON: Platinum+Gold	Éxodo
"Tommy & Pamela" (with Kenia Os)	2024	4	—	—	—	—	—	—	—	25	— (Note: "Tommy & Pamela" did not enter the Billboard Global 200, but peaked at number 137 on the Billboard Global Excl. US chart.)	AMPROFON: 2× Platinum+Gold	Éxodo
"Los Cuadros" (with Tito Double P)	2024	6	—	—	—	—	—	—	— (Note: "Los Cuadros" did not enter the Billboard Hot 100, but peaked at number five on the Bubbling Under Hot 100 chart.)	6	157	RIAA: 18× Platinum (Latin)	Incómodo
"Se Te Nota" (with Myke Towers)	2024	—	—	—	—	—	—	49	—	28	—	AMPROFON: Gold	La Pantera Negra
"La Patrulla" (with Netón Vega)	2024	1	—	—	—	—	—	—	47	2	35	AMPROFON: Diamond+Gold; RIAA: 51× Platinum (Latin)	Éxodo
"Dos Días" (with Tito Double P)	2024	2	—	—	—	—	—	—	51	2	31	RIAA: 46× Platinum (Latin)	Incómodo
"En Mi Mundo" (with Jasiel Nuñez)	2024	—	—	—	—	—	—	—	—	31	—		La Odisea
"Gervonta"	2024	8	—	—	—	—	—	—	— (Note: "Gervonta" did not enter the Billboard Hot 100, but peaked at number four on the Bubbling Under Hot 100 chart.)	11	127		Non-album single
"Hollywood" (with Estevan Plazola)	2024	14	—	—	75	—	—	—	— (Note: "Hollywood" did not enter the Billboard Hot 100, but peaked at number eight on the Bubbling Under Hot 100 chart.)	11	143	AMPROFON: 2× Platinum+Gold; RIAA: 47× Platinum (Latin)	Éxodo
"Bandida" (with Luis R. Conriquez)	2025	10	—	—	—	—	—	—	— (Note: "Bandida" did not enter the Billboard Hot 100, but peaked at number 6 on the Bubbling Under Hot 100 chart.)	26	129	AMPROFON: Platinum; RIAA: Platinum (Latin)	Muchacho Alegre
"Morena" (with Netón Vega)	2025	1	—	—	—	—	—	—	83	8	47		Mi Vida Mi Muerte
"Rari"	2025	19	—	—	—	—	—	—	— (Note: "Rari" did not enter the Billboard Hot 100, but peaked at number 13 on the Bubbling Under Hot 100 chart.)	20	194		Non-album single
"Un Trio" (with Ryan Castro and SOG)	2025	—	—	—	—	—	—	—	—	—	—	RIAA: Gold (Latin)	Sendé
"Haciendo Memoria" (with Los Plebes del Rancho de Ariel Camacho)	2025	—	—	—	—	—	—	—	—	28	—		Haciendo Memoria
"La Lleca" (with Jasiel Nuñez)	2025	—	—	—	—	—	—	—	—	28	—		Lo Aprendí En la Lleca
"Intro" (with Tito Double P)	2025	6	—	—	—	—	—	—	— (Note: "Intro" did not enter the Billboard Hot 100, but peaked at number 9 on the Bubbling Under Hot 100 chart.)	8	125		Dinastía
"Fuego" (with Bnyx, Bizarrap and Yeat)	2026	—	—	—	—	—	—	—	—	—	—		Genesis FM
"Adiccion" (with Jasiel Nuñez)	2026	—	—	—	—	—	—	—	—	—	—		Non-album single
"—" denotes a recording that did not chart in that territory.

== Other charted and certified songs ==
List of other charted songs, with selected chart positions, certifications and album name
Title	Year	Peak chart positions							Certifications	Album
Title	Year	MEX	ARG	SPA	US	US Latin	US Reg. Mex.	WW	Certifications	Album
"Luna" (with Junior H)	2023	5	—	—	30	5	—	23	AMPROFON: Diamond+2× Platinum	Génesis
"Rubicon"	2023	17	—	—	63	12	—	114	AMPROFON: Diamond+2× Platinum+Gold	Génesis
"Carnal" (with Natanael Cano)	2023	—	—	—	— (Note: "Carnal" did not enter the Billboard Hot 100, but peaked at number one on the Bubbling Under Hot 100 chart.)	21	—	157	AMPROFON: 4× Platinum+Gold	Génesis
"Gavilán II" (with Tito Double P)	2023	—	—	—	— (Note: "Gavilán II" did not enter the Billboard Hot 100, but peaked at number four on the Bubbling Under Hot 100 chart.)	24	—	—	AMPROFON: Diamond+Gold; RIAA: 22× Platinum (Latin)	Génesis
"VVS" (with Edgardo Nuñez and Los Dareyes de la Sierra)	2023	15	—	—	54	10	—	72	AMPROFON: 3× Platinum	Génesis
"Su Casa" (with Luis R. Conriquez)	2023	—	—	—	— (Note: "Su Casa" did not enter the Billboard Hot 100, but peaked at number 15 on the Bubbling Under Hot 100 chart.)	29	—	—	AMPROFON: 2× Platinum	Génesis
"Zapata"	2023	—	—	—	— (Note: "Zapata" did not enter the Billboard Hot 100, but peaked at number eight on the Bubbling Under Hot 100 chart.)	28	—	—	AMPROFON: 2× Platinum	Génesis
"La People" (with Tito Double P)	2023	12	—	—	— (Note: "La People" did not enter the Billboard Hot 100, but peaked at number six on the Bubbling Under Hot 100 chart.)	12	—	164	AMPROFON: Diamond+3× Platinum+Gold; RIAA: 23× Platinum (Latin)	Génesis
"Nueva Vida"	2023	24	—	—	86	17	—	172	AMPROFON: Diamond+3× Platinum; RIAA: 47× Platinum (Latin)	Génesis
"Pixelados" (with Luis R. Conriquez)	2024	—	—	—	— (Note: "Pixelados" did not enter the Billboard Hot 100, but peaked at number 11 on the Bubbling Under Hot 100 chart.)	18	—	—		Corridos Bélicos, Vol. IV
"Lucky Charms" (with Gabito Ballesteros and Natanael Cano)	2024	—	—	—	—	47	—	—		The GB
"Me Activo" (with Jasiel Nuñez)	2024	—	—	—	—	20	—	—	AMPROFON: Gold	Éxodo
"Sr. Smith" (with Luis R. Conriquez)	2024	—	—	—	—	22	—	—	AMPROFON: Gold	Éxodo
"Mami" (with Chino Pacas)	2024	25	—	—	— (Note: "Mami" did not enter the Billboard Hot 100, but peaked at number 20 on the Bubbling Under Hot 100 chart.)	16	—	—	AMPROFON: Platinum+Gold	Éxodo
"Belanova" (with Tito Double P)	2024	24	—	—	—	24	—	—	AMPROFON: 2× Platinum	Éxodo
"Bruce Wayne"	2024	—	—	—	—	21	—	—	AMPROFON: Gold	Éxodo
"Reloj" (with Iván Cornejo)	2024	13	—	—	69	3	25	130	AMPROFON: Platinum	Éxodo
"Ice"	2024	—	—	—	—	28	—	—		Éxodo
"Solicitado"	2024	—	—	—	—	29	—	—	AMPROFON: Gold	Éxodo
"Santal 33" (with Óscar Maydon)	2024	10	—	—	— (Note: "Santal 33" did not enter the Billboard Hot 100, but peaked at number 23 on the Bubbling Under Hot 100 chart.)	17	—	—	AMPROFON: 3× Platinum	Éxodo
"14 - 14"	2024	—	—	—	—	31	—	—	AMPROFON: Gold	Éxodo
"Put Em in the Fridge" (with Cardi B)	2024	—	—	—	— (Note: "Put Em in the Fridge" did not enter the Billboard Hot 100, but peaked at number 21 on the Bubbling Under Hot 100 chart.)	17	—	—		Éxodo
"Pa No Pensar" (with Quavo)	2024	—	—	—	—	37	—	—		Éxodo
"Mala" (with Ryan Castro)	2024	—	—	—	—	50	—	—		Éxodo
"Tiffany" (with Eladio Carrión)	2025	—	—	77	—	—	—	—		Don Kbrn
"Asquerosamente Rico" (with Óscar Maydon)	2025	6	—	—	—	25	—	— (Note: "Asquerosamente Rico" did not enter the Billboard Global 200, but peaked at number 168 on the Billboard Global Excl. US chart.)	AMPROFON: 2× Platinum+Gold	Rico o Muerto, Vol. 1
"Dopamina" (with Tito Double P)	2025	1	—	—	52	2	1	20	RIAA: 12× Platinum (Latin)	Dinastía
"Ni Pedo" (with Tito Double P)	2025	6	—	—	76	8	4	74		Dinastía
"Putielegante" (with Tito Double P)	2025	11	—	—	— (Note: "Putielegante" did not enter the Billboard Hot 100, but peaked at number 17 on the Bubbling Under Hot 100 chart.)	14	10	146		Dinastía
"7-3" (with Tito Double P)	2025	2	—	—	— (Note: "7-3" did not enter the Billboard Hot 100, but peaked at number 2 on the Bubbling Under Hot 100 chart.)	9	5	53	RIAA: 9× Platinum (Latin)	Dinastía
"Billete" (with Tito Double P)	2025	20	—	—	—	15	11	—		Dinastía
"Daño" (with Tito Double P)	2025	2	—	—	75	5	1	47	RIAA: 13× Platinum (Latin)	Dinastía
"Trucha" (with Tito Double P)	2025	25	—	—	—	18	12	—		Dinastía
"Morras II" (with Tito Double P)	2025	—	—	—	—	24	17	—		Dinastía
"Mezcal" (with Tito Double P)	2025	—	—	—	—	22	15	—		Dinastía
"Malibu" (with Tito Double P)	2025	—	—	—	—	23	15	—		Dinastía
"20s" (with Tito Double P)	2025	—	—	—	—	27	19	—		Dinastía
"Viejo Lobo" (with Tito Double P)	2025	—	—	—	—	30	20	—		Dinastía
"Tú Con Él" (with Tito Double P)	2025	8	—	—	—	25	7	—		Dinastía
"Bckpckbyz" (with Tito Double P)	2025	3	—	—	79	9	5	58		Dinastía
"Droga Letal" (with Junior H and Gael Valenzuela)	2026	9	—	—	100	12	1	96		Depressed MFKZ
"Ganga" (with Tito Double P and El Randal)	2026	8	—	—	—	15	6	— (Note: "Ganga" did not enter the Billboard Global 200, but peaked at number 176 on the Billboard Global Excl. US chart.)		Dinastía (Deluxe)
"Chiclona" (with Tito Double P and Lencho)	2026	3	—	—	— (Note: "Chiclona" did not enter the Billboard Hot 100, but peaked at number 5 on the Bubbling Under Hot 100 chart.)	5	2	120	RIAA: 6× Platinum (Latin)	Dinastía (Deluxe)
"Marianata" (with Rey Quinto)	2026	—	—	—	—	35	14	—		Dinastía (Deluxe)
"London" (with Tito Double P and Armenta)	2026	15	—	—	—	19	7	—		Dinastía (Deluxe)
"Last Breath" (Kanye West featuring Peso Pluma)	2026	—	—	—	81	5	—	155		Bully
"Amigos Con Derechos" (with Eslabon Armado)	2026	—	—	—	—	7	2	—		Nocturno
"—" denotes a recording that did not chart in that territory.

== Guest appearances ==
List of non-single guest appearances, with other performing artists, showing year released and album name
Title	Year	Other artist(s)	Album
"Gente del Cartel"	2021	Jorge Morales el Jilguero	Pisteando Con Amigos
"La Goma"	2021	Jorge Morales el Jilguero	Pisteando Con Amigos
"Pancake"	2023	Natanael Cano	Nata Montana
"Qlona"	2023	Karol G	Mañana Será Bonito (Bichota Season)
"Pixelados"	2024	Luis R. Conriquez	Corridos Bélicos, Vol. IV
"Drunk"	2024	¥$, Kodak Black	Vultures 2 (Digital Deluxe)
"California Sunset"	2024	Jasiel Nuñez	La Odisea
"Amiri"	2024	Jasiel Nuñez, Tito Double P	La Odisea
"Last Breath"	2026	Kanye West	Bully

== Notes ==
Notes for chart peak positions
