= Éxodo Tour =

2024 concert tour by Peso Pluma

- Tour by Peso Pluma
- Promotional poster
- Location: North America
- Associated album: Éxodo
- Start date: 19 July 2024
- End date: 13 October 2024
- No. of shows: 35

Peso Pluma concert chronology
- Doble P Tour (2023); Éxodo Tour (2024); ...

The Éxodo Tour was the second headlining concert tour and debut arena tour by Mexican musician Peso Pluma, in support of his fourth studio album Éxodo (2024). The tour began on 19 July 2024 at Moody Center in Austin, Texas and ended on 13 October 2024 at First Horizon Coliseum in Greensboro.

== Background ==
Peso Pluma announced the Éxodo Tour on 20 February 2024. It was also announced that there will be an "all-new show, inclusive of a fully reimagined set design and setlist, featuring his remarkable live band".

== Set list ==
This set list is representative of the show on 19 July 2024, in Austin, Texas. It is not representative of all of the concerts of the tour.

Act 1

1. "La Patrulla"
2. "La Durango"
3. "Me Activo"
4. "AMG"
5. "Rubicon"
6. "Siempre Pendientes"
7. "Ice"
8. "14 - 14"

Act 2

1. "Luna"
2. "Lagunas"
3. "Bye"
4. "Por Las Noches"
5. "Reloj"
6. "Santal 33"
7. "Ella Baila Sola"

Act 3

1. "Mala"
2. "Quema"
3. "Qlona"
4. "La Bebé (Remix)"
5. "Tommy & Pamela"
6. "Put Em in the Fridge"
7. "Plebada"

Act 4

1. "Nueva Vida"
2. "Los Talibanes del Prieto" (Los Plebes del Rancho de Ariel Camacho cover)
3. "Hollywood"
4. "Rosa Pastel"
5. "PRC"
6. "El Gavilán"
7. "Gavilán II"
8. "La People"
9. "La People II"
10. "Zapata"

Act 5

1. "El Azul"
2. "Belanova"
3. "Lady Gaga"
4. "Vino Tinto"
5. "Teka"

Special guests

- Snoop Dogg was a special guest on the 24 August 2024 show in Los Angeles, where he performed "The Next Episode" and "Drop It Like It's Hot".
- Becky G joined Peso Pluma onstage to perform "Chanel" on the 24 August 2024 show in Los Angeles.
- Cypress Hill were special guests on the 30 August 2024 show in Sacramento, where they performed "Insane in the Brain".
- Marca MP were special guests on the 30 August 2024 show in Sacramento, where they performed "El Güero" and "No Me Voy a Rajar".
- Saweetie was a special guest on the 31 August 2024 show in San Francisco, where she performed "Tap In" and "My Type".
- Gunna was a special guest on the 31 August 2024 show in San Francisco, where he performed "One of Wun" and "FukUMean".
- Héctor Rubio was a special guest on the 31 August 2024 show in San Francisco, where he performed "Se Volvieron Locos".
- Jasiel Nuñez, who is a prominent guest in the tour, joined Peso Pluma onstage to perform "Rosa Pastel" on the 31 August 2024 show in San Francisco. He performed the song again, along with "Bipolar" and "Me Activo", on the 3 October 2024 show in Brooklyn.
- Don Toliver was a special guest on the 5 September 2024 show in San Diego, where he performed "Lemonade" and "After Party".
- Yng Lvcas joined Peso Pluma onstage to perform "La Bebé (Remix)" on the 5 September 2024 show in San Diego. He again performed the song with him on the 3 October 2024 show in Brooklyn.
- Gabito Ballesteros joined Peso Pluma onstage to perform "Lady Gaga" on the 5 September 2024 show in San Diego.
- Los Dareyes de la Sierra joined Peso Pluma onstage to perform "VVS" on the 5 September 2024 show in San Diego. They performed the song again, along with "Hasta el Día de Hoy", on the 3 October 2024 show in Brooklyn.
- Ty Dolla Sign was a special guest on the 6 September 2024 show in Palm Desert, where he performed "Carnival".
- 50 Cent was a special guest on the 12 September 2024 show in Las Vegas, where he performed "Candy Shop".
- El Alfa joined Peso Pluma onstage to perform "Plebada" on the 12 September 2024 show in Las Vegas.
- Gucci Mane was a special guest on the 28 September 2024 show in Atlanta, where he performed "Both".
- Sexyy Red was a special guest on the 28 September 2024 show in Atlanta, where she performed "Looking for the Hoes (Ain't My Fault)" and "Get It Sexyy".
- Ice Spice was a special guest on the 3 October 2024 show in Brooklyn, where she performed "Deli".
- Eladio Carrión joined Peso Pluma onstage to perform "77" and "Mbappé" on the 3 October 2024 show in Brooklyn.
- Tito Double P, who is a prominent guest in the tour, joined Peso Pluma onstage to perform "La People II" and "Dos Días" on the 3 October 2024 show in Brooklyn.
- Estevan Plazola joined Peso Pluma onstage to perform "Hollywood" on the 3 October 2024 show in Brooklyn.

== Tour dates ==
List of 2024 concertsshowing date, city, country, and venue
Date (2024)	City	Country	Venue	Attendance	Revenue
19 July	Austin	United States	Moody Center	—	—
20 July	Dallas	United States	American Airlines Center	—	—
21 July	Edinburg	United States	Bert Ogden Arena	—	—
26 July	Houston	United States	Toyota Center	—	—
27 July	San Antonio	United States	Frost Bank Center	—	—
28 July	Fort Worth	United States	Dickies Arena	—	—
31 July	Indianapolis	United States	Gainbridge Fieldhouse	—	—
2 August	Minneapolis	United States	Target Center	—	—
3 August	Omaha	United States	CHI Health Center	—	—
6 August	Milwaukee	United States	Fiserv Forum	—	—
9 August	Denver	United States	Ball Arena	—	—
10 August	Rosarito	Mexico	Baja Beach Fest	—	—
11 August	Salt Lake City	United States	Delta Center	—	—
16 August	Seattle	United States	Climate Pledge Arena	—	—
17 August	Portland	United States	Moda Center	—	—
22 August	Anaheim	United States	Honda Center	—	—
24 August	Inglewood	United States	Intuit Dome	—	—
28 August	San Jose	United States	SAP Center	—	—
30 August	Sacramento	United States	Golden 1 Center	—	—
31 August	San Francisco	United States	Chase Center	—	—
5 September	San Diego	United States	Pechanga Arena	—	—
6 September	Palm Desert	United States	Acrisure Arena	—	—
7 September	Fresno	United States	Save Mart Center	—	—
12 September	Las Vegas	United States	T-Mobile Arena	—	—
14 September	Phoenix	United States	Footprint Center	—	—
18 September	Mexico City	Mexico	Palacio de los Deportes	—	—
19 September	Mexico City	Mexico	Palacio de los Deportes	—	—
24 September	Monterrey	Mexico	Arena Monterrey	—	—
28 September	Atlanta	United States	State Farm Arena	—	—
30 September	Philadelphia	United States	Wells Fargo Center	—	—
3 October	Brooklyn	United States	Barclays Center	—	—
5 October	Chicago	United States	United Center	—	—
6 October	Chicago	United States	United Center	—	—
9 October	Washington, D.C.	United States	Capital One Arena	—	—
11 October	Uncasville	United States	Mohegan Sun Arena	—	—
13 October	Greensboro	United States	First Horizon Coliseum	—	—

=== Cancelled shows ===
List of cancelled concertsshowing date, city, country, venue, reason for cancellation and reference
Date	City	Country	Venue	Reason	Ref.
16 October 2024	Tampa	United States	Amalie Arena	Hurricane Milton	
17 October 2024	Miami	United States	Kaseya Center	Hurricane Milton	
