= List of Billboard Regional Mexican Albums number ones of 2026 =

The Regional Mexican Albums, published in Billboard magazine, is a record chart that features Latin music sales information for regional styles of Mexican music. This data are compiled by Nielsen SoundScan from a sample that includes music stores, music departments at department stores, verifiable sales from concert venues and track equivalent album units and streaming equivalent album units in the United States.

== Chart history ==
Issue date	Album	Artist(s)	Ref.
January 3	111xpantia	Fuerza Regida	
January 10	Dinastía	Peso Pluma and Tito Double P	
January 17	Dinastía	Peso Pluma and Tito Double P	
January 24	Dinastía	Peso Pluma and Tito Double P	
January 31	Dinastía	Peso Pluma and Tito Double P	
February 7	Dinastía	Peso Pluma and Tito Double P	
February 14	Dinastía	Peso Pluma and Tito Double P	
February 21	Dinastía	Peso Pluma and Tito Double P	
February 28	DEP</3$$ED MFKZ	Junior H and Gael Valenzuela	
March 7	Dinastía	Peso Pluma and Tito Double P	
March 14	Dinastía	Peso Pluma and Tito Double P	
March 21	Dinastía	Peso Pluma and Tito Double P	
March 28	Dinastía	Peso Pluma and Tito Double P	
April 4	Dinastía	Peso Pluma and Tito Double P	
April 11	Dinastía	Peso Pluma and Tito Double P	
April 18	Dinastía	Peso Pluma and Tito Double P	
April 25	Dinastía	Peso Pluma and Tito Double P	
May 2	Dinastía	Peso Pluma and Tito Double P	
May 9	Dinastía	Peso Pluma and Tito Double P	
May 16	Dinastía	Peso Pluma and Tito Double P	
May 23	Dinastía	Peso Pluma and Tito Double P	
May 30	Dinastía	Peso Pluma and Tito Double P	
June 6	Dinastía	Peso Pluma and Tito Double P	
June 13	Acomodo	Tito Double P	
June 20	Acomodo	Tito Double P	
June 27	111xpantia	Fuerza Regida	
July 4	111xpantia	Fuerza Regida	
July 11	111xpantia	Fuerza Regida	
July 18	111xpantia	Fuerza Regida	
July 25	111xpantia	Fuerza Regida	
August 1	111xpantia	Fuerza Regida	
August 8	111xpantia	Fuerza Regida	
August 15	111xpantia	Fuerza Regida	
August 22	111xpantia	Fuerza Regida	
August 29	111xpantia	Fuerza Regida	
September 5	111xpantia	Fuerza Regida	
September 12	111xpantia	Fuerza Regida	
September 19	111xpantia	Fuerza Regida	
September 26	111xpantia	Fuerza Regida	
October 3	111xpantia	Fuerza Regida	
October 10	111xpantia	Fuerza Regida	
October 17	111xpantia	Fuerza Regida	
October 24	111xpantia	Fuerza Regida	
October 31	111xpantia	Fuerza Regida	
November 7	111xpantia	Fuerza Regida	
November 14	111xpantia	Fuerza Regida	
November 21	111xpantia	Fuerza Regida	
