= Bipolar (song) =

2023 single by Peso Pluma, Jasiel Nuñez and Junior H

Single by Peso Pluma, Jasiel Nuñez and Junior H

from the album La Odisea
- Language: Spanish
- Published: 7 September 2023
- Genre: Regional Mexican, corrido, nortec, Latin trap, Reggaetón, Urbano latino, corrido tumbado, Techno-norteño, Latin Drill
- Length: 4:25
- Label: Double P
- Songwriter: Jasiel Nuñez
- Producers: Jasiel Nuñez; Ernesto Murillo; Alan Manzo; Ernesto Fernández; Don Miguel Ruiz

Peso Pluma singles chronology
"Qlona" (2023)	"Bipolar" (2023)	"La Chamba" (2023)

Jasiel Nuñez singles chronology
"Lagunas" (2023)	"Bipolar" (2023)	"Corazón Frío" (2023)

Junior H singles chronology
"El Patrocinador" (2023)	"Bipolar" (2023)	"En Altavoz" (2023)

Music video
- "Bipolar" on YouTube

"Bipolar" is a song performed by Mexican singers Peso Pluma, Jasiel Nuñez, and Junior H. It was released on 7 September 2023, through Double P Records, as the lead single from Nuñez's debut studio album La Odisea (2024). It was written and produced by Jasiel Nuñez. The song was also produced by Ernesto Murillo, Alan Manzo, Ernesto Fernández, and Don Miguel Ruiz.

== Background ==
Before the release of "Bipolar", Peso Pluma had been featured in the songs "Qlona", "Ojos Azules", and "Ex-Special". Jasiel Nuñez and Junior H are frequent collaborators with Peso Pluma, with Jasiel Nuñez appearing in "Rosa Pastel" and "Lagunas", from the album Génesis, and Junior H featuring in "El Azul", "Lady Gaga", and "Luna".

A music video was released on the same day of the song's release. It was directed by Fernando Lugo.

== Composition ==
Lyrically, it talks about a protagonist who characterizes themselves as bipolar, and cannot resist the urge to reconnect with their former love, eventually coming to the realization that those expressions of affection are insincere. It also captures the three singers reflecting on their past relationships.

== Chart performance ==
"Bipolar" peaked at number 60 on Billboard Hot 100 and peaked at number 86 on the Billboard Global 200 chart. The song also peaked at number seven on the Hot Latin Songs chart, number one on Regional Mexican Airplay, number 12 on Mexico Songs, number eight on Latin Airplay, and number four on Latin Streaming Songs.

== Charts ==
Chart performance for "Bipolar"
Chart (2023)	Peak position
Global 200 (Billboard)	86
Mexico (Billboard)	12
US Billboard Hot 100	60
US Hot Latin Songs (Billboard)	7
US Latin Airplay (Billboard)	8
US Regional Mexican Airplay (Billboard)	1
