= Intro (Peso Pluma and Tito Double P song) =

2025 single by Peso Pluma and Tito Double P

Single by Peso Pluma and Tito Double P

from the album Dinastía
- Released: 20 November 2025
- Genre: Corridos tumbados
- Length: 2:59
- Label: Double P
- Songwriters: Hassan Emilio Kabande Laija; Jesús Roberto Lajia García; Jorge Jiménez; Pablo Jesús Gastélum Olivares
- Producers: Ernesto Fernández; Peso Pluma; Iván Leal "Parka"

Peso Pluma singles chronology
"La Lleca" (2025)	"Intro" (2025)

Tito Double P singles chronology
"Échame La Mano" (2025)	"Intro" (2025)

Music video
- "Intro" on YouTube

"Intro" is a song by Mexican singers Peso Pluma and Tito Double P. It was released on November 20, 2025, through Double P Records, along with a music video, serving as the lead single from both artists' upcoming collaborative studio album, Dinastía (2025). The song was produced by Ernesto Fernández, Peso Pluma and Iván Leal "Parka".

== Music video ==
The music video stars Mexican actress Kate del Castillo. It features a spoken-word introduction in which she talks about duality and the power that results from the unity of opposing forces.

== Charts ==
Chart performance for "Intro"
Chart (2025–2026)	Peak position
Global 200 (Billboard)	125
Mexico (Billboard)	6
US Bubbling Under Hot 100 (Billboard)	9
US Hot Latin Songs (Billboard)	8
