= Rosa Pastel =

Rosa Pastel ("pastel pink") may refer to

- "Rosa Pastel" (Belanova song), 2006
- "Rosa Pastel" (Peso Pluma and Jasiel Nuñez song), 2023
