= Daño =

Song by Peso Pluma & Tito Double P

Daño is a regional Mexican song by Peso Pluma and Tito Double P, released on December 25, 2025. The track appears on the collaborative album DINASTÍA. The song was produced by Ernesto Fernandez, Hassan Emilio Kabande Laija (Peso Pluma), and Ivan Leal Reyes ("Parka"). The song reached No.7 on Billboard Hot Latin charts, No. 75 on Billboard Hot 100. and No. 2 on Mexico's Apple Playlist and Spotify.

== Background and composition ==
"Daño" explores the emotional aftermath of a sudden breakup, dealing with themes of unresolved closure and lingering attachment despite emotional pain. The song's narrative follows a relationship's abrupt end, where one partner—described as emotionally exhausted—walks away without dramatic confrontation.

The composition blends traditional regional Mexican instrumentation with corridos tumbados production. The song's arrangement features bass guitar, acoustic guitar, trombone, and horn elements, creating the signature sound associated with the artists' collaborations.

== Lyrics and themes ==
The track centers on the internal contradiction of loving someone while acknowledging they cause harm ("Te amo aunque me hagas tanto fucking daño"). Lyrically, the song captures the discomfort of returning to empty routines and the difficulty of everyday activities—such as smiling—following separation. The refrain questions the strangeness of home without a loved one's presence, expressing longing for physical connection and emotional stability.

== Charts ==
The song reached No.7 on Billboard Hot Latin charts and No. 75 on Billboard Hot 100 on the week of January 11, 2026.
