= El Tsurito =

Single by Junior H, Peso Pluma and Gabito Ballesteros
- Language: Spanish
- Released: 7 April 2023
- Genre: Regional Mexican
- Label: Rancho Humilde; Prajin Parlay; Los CT
- Songwriters: Brandon Daniel Candia Nuñez; Filiberto Díaz; Gabriel Ballesteros
- Producer: Jimmy Humilde

Junior H singles chronology
"Tronando Ligas" (2023)	"El Tsurito" (2023)	"Abcdario" (2023)

Peso Pluma singles chronology
"Las Morras" (2023)	"El Tsurito" (2023)	"Rosa Pastel" (2023)

Gabito Ballesteros singles chronology
"Ya Corazón" (2023)	"El Tsurito" (2023)	"Pasito a Pasito" (2023)

Music video
- "El Tsurito" on YouTube

"El Tsurito" is a song by Mexican singers Junior H, Peso Pluma and Gabito Ballesteros. It was released on 7 April 2023, through Rancho Humilde, Prajin Parlay, and Los CT.

== Charts ==
Chart performance for "El Tsurito"
Chart (2023)	Peak position
Global 200 (Billboard)	127
Mexico (Billboard)	15
US Bubbling Under Hot 100 (Billboard)	6
US Hot Latin Songs (Billboard)	23

== Certifications ==
Certifications for "El Tsurito"
Region	Certification	Certified units/sales
United States (RIAA)	17× Platinum (Latin)	1,020,000^{‡}
^{‡} Sales+streaming figures based on certification alone.

== Cover art ==
The cover art for "El Tsurito" features a highly stylized, golden Nissan Sentra B13 drifting through a neon-lit cityscape, evoking the aesthetic of late-2000s street racing video games. The design closely references the visual style of popular video-game Midnight Club published by Rockstar Games, with bold metallic typography, Japanese kanji characters, and a side spine element mimicking the layout of a Retro PlayStation game case. The visual theme merges urban nightlife with car culture, aligning with the song’s energetic and rebellious tone.
