= Lagunas (song) =

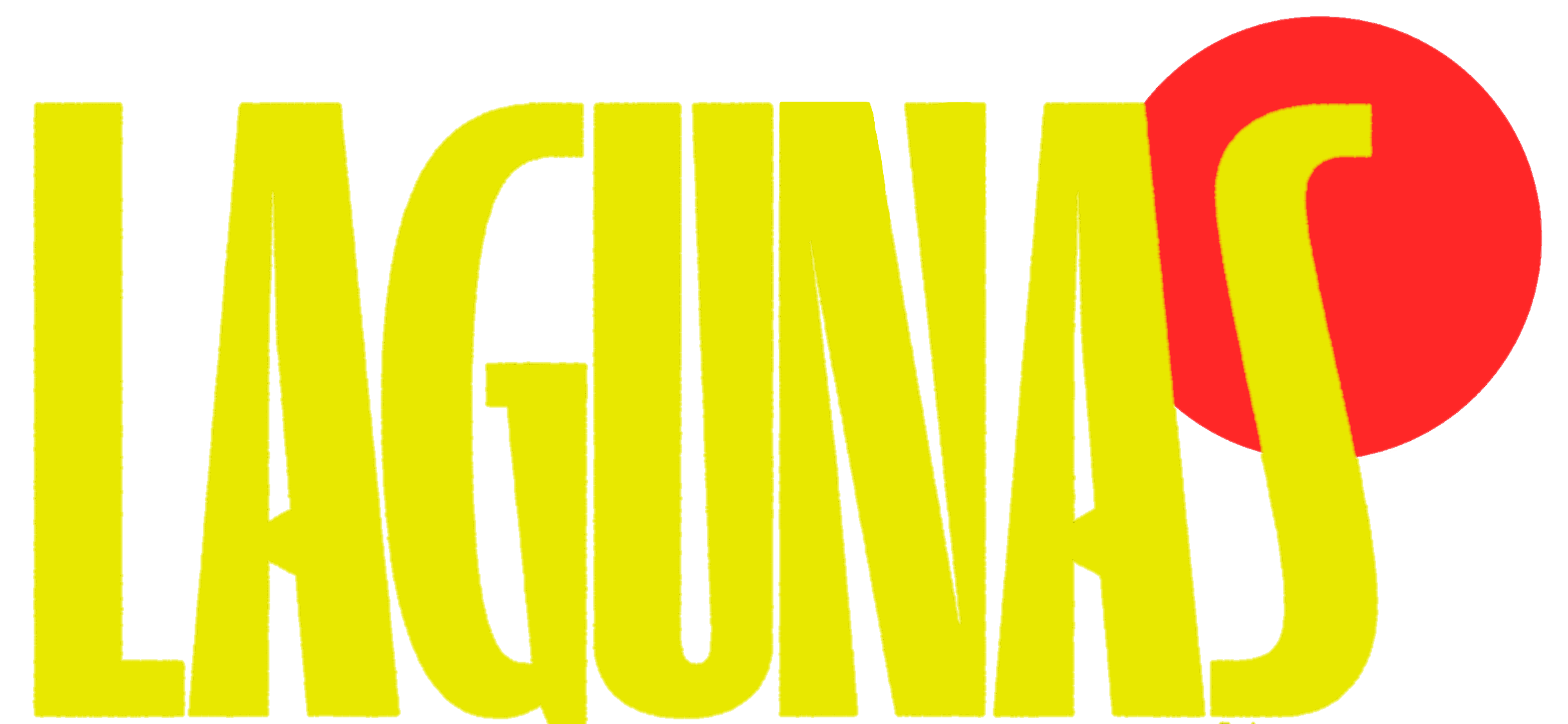
- Official logo

Single by Peso Pluma and Jasiel Nuñez

from the album Génesis
- Language: Spanish
- Released: 7 July 2023
- Genre: Regional Mexican; corridos tumbados
- Length: 3:50
- Label: Double P
- Songwriter: Jasiel Nuñez
- Producers: Jasiel Nuñez; Ernesto Murillo; George Prajin; Miguel de Jesús Ruiz Huerta

Peso Pluma singles chronology
| "Tulum" (2023) | "Lagunas" (2023) | "Quema" (2023) |

Jasiel Nuñez singles chronology
| "Que Loco Es" (2023) | "Lagunas" (2023) | "Bipolar" (2023) |

Music video
- "Lagunas" on YouTube

"Lagunas" is a song by Mexican singers Peso Pluma and Jasiel Nuñez. It was released on 22 June 2023, as part of the former's album Génesis (2023), later released as the album's seventh single on 7 July 2023. The song was written and produced by Nuñez, with Ernesto Murillo, George Prajin, and Miguel de Jesús Ruiz Huerta as co-producers.

== Background and release ==
In June 2023, Peso Pluma announced the release date of his third studio album Génesis and revealed its official tracklist, where "Lagunas" was featured as its 13th track and Jasiel Nuñez being featured. "Lagunas" marks the second collaboration with both singers, the first being "Rosa Pastel". Both songs marked Nuñez's debut on the Billboard Hot 100, charting at numbers 90 and 93, respectively.

== Promotion and usage ==
The official music video was released on 7 July 2023, on Peso Pluma's official YouTube channel. The video filmed by John Rodriguez, in Punta Cana, Dominican Republic, and was produced by the former. On 23 November 2023, on Thanksgiving, American rapper Snoop Dogg posted a video on Instagram of him listening to "Lagunas" and both singers acknowledged it and responded on the social platform. In December 2023, Mexican singer Ed Maverick released a cover of "Lagunas".

== Charts ==
=== Weekly charts ===
Weekly chart performance for "Lagunas"
| Chart (2023) | Peak position |
|---|---|
| Global 200 (Billboard) | 109 |
| Mexico (Billboard) | 23 |
| US Billboard Hot 100 | 77 |
| US Hot Latin Songs (Billboard) | 16 |

=== Year-end charts ===
Year-end chart performance for "Lagunas"
| Chart (2023) | Position |
|---|---|
| US Hot Latin Songs (Billboard) | 41 |

== Certifications ==
Certifications for "Lagunas"
| Region | Certification | Certified units/sales |
|---|---|---|
| Mexico (AMPROFON) | 2× Diamond+3× Platinum+Gold | 1,890,000^{‡} |
| United States (RIAA) | 31× Platinum (Latin) | 1,860,000^{‡} |
^{‡} Sales+streaming figures based on certification alone.
