= Rari (song) =

2025 single by Peso Pluma

Single by Peso Pluma
- Released: March 13, 2025
- Genre: Corridos tumbados
- Length: 2:33
- Label: Double P
- Songwriters: Hassan Emilio Kabande Laija; Jose Manuel Osorio Chavez
- Producer: Peso Pluma

Peso Pluma singles chronology
"Alley Oop" (2025)	"Rari" (2025)	"Un Trio" (2025)

Music video
- "Rari" on YouTube

"Rari" is a single by Mexican singer Peso Pluma, released on March 13, 2025.

== Background ==
Peso Pluma's girlfriend, Mexican singer Kenia Os, appears on the cover art of the single, which shows her lying on a white Ferrari and is taken from the set of the song's music video.

== Composition ==
"Rari" is a corridos tumbados song. In the lyrics, Peso Pluma revolves around his luxurious lifestyle, including night parties and expensive cars such as Cadillac and Ferrari.

== Music video ==
The music video was released on March 15, 2025. It features dark sets, dim lights and a white Ferrari Testarossa in the background, and appearances from both Peso Pluma and Kenia Os. Pluma wears a leather cap and jacket with sunglasses, while Os wears in two outfits: a white miniskirt adorned with feathers on the sleeves (as depicted on the single cover) and a black outfit with sunglasses.

== Charts ==
Chart performance for "Rari"
Chart (2025)	Peak position
Global 200 (Billboard)	194
US Bubbling Under Hot 100 (Billboard)	13
US Hot Latin Songs (Billboard)	20
