= Sembrando =

2022 EP by Peso Pluma

- Peso Pluma - Sembrando EP cover art. The artwork was made by So Hood GFX

EP by Peso Pluma
- Released: April 20, 2022
- Genre: Regional Mexican; urban sierreño; corridos tumbados
- Length: 20:36
- Label: Prajin Parlay; Worms Music

Peso Pluma chronology
| Efectos Secundarios (2021) | Sembrando (2022) | Génesis (2023) |

Singles from Sembrando
- 1. "Spiral" Released: November 25, 2021; 2. "Sembrando" Released: April 20, 2022

Sembrando is the debut extended play by Mexican singer Peso Pluma. It was released on 20 April 2022, through Prajin Parlay and Worms Music. Supported by the singles "Spiral" and its title track "Sembrando", the EP debuted at number 48 on the US Top Latin Albums chart with 3,000 album-equivalent units and won the award for Best Regional Mexican Album at the 2023 Premios Juventud.

== Background and recording ==
The recording sessions of Sembrando took place in Culiacán, Guadalajara, and Los Angeles. In an interview with Bandamax, Peso Pluma said the Sembrando was released as a gift for his fans. Most of the songs from the EP were recorded in one day.

"Spiral" was released in November 25, 2021, as the lead single from the EP. In April 20, 2022, its title track "Sembrando" was released as its second single; Pluma stated that the song was for anyone who "liked consuming marijuana". Its release date was chosen for the famous moniker "4/20", in the same way the title of the EP alludes to this.

== Composition ==
Sembrando is a corridos tumbados album, with slight incorporations of trap music and psychedelic sounds. Its title track was written by his cousin Roberto Laija García, known as Tito Double P, and "El Viejón de la Loma" was written by his friend Héctor Rubio.

== Commercial performance ==
Pluma earned his first charting album, peaking at number 48 on the Top Latin Albums chart, number 13 on Regional Mexican Albums in the United States, and position 25 on the Heatseekers Albums chart, with 3,000 album-equivalent units.

== Track listing ==
Sembrando track listing
| No. | Title | Writer(s) | Length |
|---|---|---|---|
| 1. | "Sembrando" | Jesús Roberto "Tito" Laija García | 3:08 |
| 2. | "El Capi" | Hassan Emilio Kabande Laija | 3:42 |
| 3. | "El Güero" | Kabande Laija | 2:51 |
| 4. | "El Viejón de la Loma" | Héctor Rubio | 3:50 |
| 5. | "Me Convertí" | Kabande Laija | 3:58 |
| 6. | "Spiral" | Kabande Laija | 3:04 |
| Total length: | | | 20:36 |

== Charts ==
Chart performance for Sembrando
| Chart (2023) | Peak position |
|---|---|
| US Heatseekers Albums (Billboard) | 25 |
| US Regional Mexican Albums (Billboard) | 13 |
| US Top Latin Albums (Billboard) | 48 |

== Awards and nominations ==
| Year | Award | Category | Result | Ref. |
|---|---|---|---|---|
| 2023 | Premios Juventud | Best Regional Mexican Album | Won | |
