= Put Em in the Fridge =

Song by Peso Pluma and Cardi B

from the album Éxodo
- Language: Spanish; English
- Released: 20 June 2024
- Genre: Trap; corrido
- Length: 2:34
- Label: Double P
- Songwriters: Belcalis Almánzar; Carlos Alberto Butter Aguila; Akil C. King; Hassan Emilio Kabande Laija; Jean C. Hernández Espinell; Ryan Vojtesak; Mateo Dorado; Siggy Vazquez Rodriguez
- Producers: Charlie Handsome; Fresh

Lyric video
- "Put Em in the Fridge" on YouTube

"Put Em in the Fridge" is a song by Mexican rapper Peso Pluma and American rapper Cardi B, which was released on 20 June 2024, through Double P Records, as part of the former's fourth studio album Éxodo (2024). The song was produced by Charlie Handsome and Akil C. King (Fresh).

== Composition ==
"Put Em in the Fridge" is a corrido-trap song, with incorporations of hip hop beats, a requinto guitar, and a horn sample loop running through the song. Produced by Charlie Handsome and Fresh, both artists use Spanglish lyrics throughout the song which revolve around transporting cocaine and "putting someone in the fridge".

== Reception ==
"Put Em in the Fridge" was ranked as the sixth best track off Éxodo by Billboard, stating that "the way they complement each other with each verse is truly impressive". Alex Gonzalez from Uproxx called the song "some real mob boss [shit]". On the issue dated 29 June 2024, "Put Em in the Fridge" debuted at number eight on the US Latin Digital Song Sales chart, becoming the first track off Éxodo, without becoming a post-single, to appear on a song chart before the rest of the album's tracks, additionally making it Peso Pluma's 27th and Cardi B's seventh top-10 entry on the chart.

== Charts ==
Chart performance for "Put Em in the Fridge"
Chart (2024)	Peak position
US Bubbling Under Hot 100 (Billboard)	21
US Hot Latin Songs (Billboard)	17
US Rhythmic Airplay (Billboard)	33
