= Tulum (song) =

Single by Peso Pluma and Grupo Frontera

from the album Génesis (Deluxe)
- Language: Spanish
- Released: 29 June 2023
- Genre: Regional Mexican; norteño-cumbia
- Length: 3:29
- Label: Double P; Prajin Parlay
- Songwriters: Hassan Emilio Kabande Laija; Andrés Correa Ríos; Edgar Barrera
- Producer: Barrera

Peso Pluma singles chronology
| "Plebada" (2023) | "Tulum" (2023) | "Lagunas" (2023) |

Grupo Frontera singles chronology
| "Le Va Doler" (2023) | "Tulum" (2023) | "Ojitos Rojos" (2023) |

Music video
- "Tulum" on YouTube

"Tulum" is a song recorded and performed by the Mexican singer Peso Pluma and the American band Grupo Frontera. It was written by the singer, by Andrés Correa Ríos and Edgar Barrera, the latter also produced it. It was released on 29 June 2023, as the fifth official single for Peso Pluma's third studio album, Génesis, in the deluxe version. The song was surprise posted alongside its music video on Peso Pluma's official YouTube channel.

== Background and release ==
After the music of both artists was the topic of conversation in several of the morning conferences of the President of Mexico Andrés Manuel López Obrador who recommended and broadcast live songs like "No Se Va", "Frágil" and "Un x100to" by Grupo Frontera, and that on the other hand he was against the music of Peso Pluma and the corridos tumbados since this "encourages the consumption of drugs and violence", and that the subject was not discussed in the media, the song was launched in a surprise way, which, contrary to the president's opinion, does not speak of violence and excesses as a form of protest.

The release occurred after announcing on social networks on June 29, 2023, at the same time of the release of the deluxe version of the Génesis.

== Reception ==
=== Comments from critics and media ===
The release generated generally positive reviews from digital and print media, highlighting the singer's new sound, leaving aside the war themes and the sound from Sierra. The site Cultura Colectiva he named it "the song of the summer" since "it spreads the romance of the lyrics and even makes you want to dance, on the beach and the waves of the sea." Rolling Stone magazine wrote that the song was: "a perfect summer anthem that combines the iconic sounds of each of the acts with upbeat melodies that serenade a love interest...". The Mexican newspaper La Razón assured that the song would be the new world hit for both artists. The portal 24 Horas Chiapas mentioned "("Tulum") has summer overtones, which makes it very ad hoc for the season. The site Sopitas published: "this song comes more with a romantic northern cumbia vibe for those who find themselves in love dilemmas". The newspaper El Heraldo de Chihuahua through El Sol de Parral said: "(«Tulum») addresses a theme of love, which together with the characteristic rhythm of the group, added to the peculiar voice of Peso Pluma, make it a real gem". The portal MSN published: "this song breaks a bit with the themes that «Double P» (Nickname of Peso Pluma) uses in its lyrics, since it leaves aside drug culture, to talk about love". The radio group Los 40 expressed: "(in the song) you can hear that the styles of both artists are respected, thus leaving a romantic essence and a very catchy rhythm to listen to".

=== Commercial performance ===
"Tulum" debuted the week of July 9 in position 10 of Monitor Latino's Top 10 in Guatemala; the week of July 15, 2023 at number 43 on the US Billboard Hot 100 chart, at number 6 on the Hot Latin Songs and Mexico Songs charts respectively, at number 4 on Bolivia Songs and 25 on the Global 200, all the debuts happened in the same week.

== Music and lyrics ==
Musically, the song is a norteña cumbia with norteño arrangements from Monterrey highlighting instruments such as the accordion, the quinto bass, the electric bass, the drums and the congas. Lyrically, he talks about an ex-partner in which he asks her to leave her new boyfriend and return, since he doesn't deserve her. The lyrics includes, "Baby, a mí lo que me faltaba eras tú / Tú eres lo más rico que hay en el menú / Dile que se despida / Que ya tú estás convencida / Dile que tienes otro hombre / Si quieres dile mi nombre / Que la comida se enfría, cuando se descuida".

== Promotion ==
=== Music video ===
A music video premiered the same day the song was released, was uploaded to Featherweight's official YouTube channel, and quickly went number 6 trending in Mexico. It was directed by Abelardo Báez. The video stars the performers of the song dressed in strong, vibrant colors, showing scenes of them dancing and enjoying a house party located on a tropical beach. On its first day of release, the video amassed 2.9 million views.

=== Lyric video ===
The lyric video was released on June 29, 2023, along with other lyric videos and audio visualizers that premiered simultaneously with the release of Génesis (Deluxe).

=== Visualizer ===
The audio visualizer was released simultaneously on June 29, 2023, with other visualizers and lyric videos that premiered simultaneously with the release of Génesis (Deluxe).

== Usage in media ==
The song appears on EA Sports FC 24 on the game’s soundtrack.

== Charts ==
=== Weekly charts ===
Weekly chart performance for "Tulum"
| Chart (2023) | Peak position |
|---|---|
| Argentina Hot 100 (Billboard) | 64 |
| Bolivia (Billboard) | 4 |
| Bolivia (Monitor Latino) | 2 |
| El Salvador (Monitor Latino) | 18 |
| Global 200 (Billboard) | 25 |
| Guatemala (Monitor Latino) | 6 |
| Mexico (Billboard) | 6 |
| Paraguay (Monitor Latino) | 45 |
| US Billboard Hot 100 | 43 |
| US Hot Latin Songs (Billboard) | 6 |

=== Year-end charts ===
Year-end chart performance for "Tulum"
| Chart (2023) | Position |
|---|---|
| Global 200 (Billboard) | 186 |
| US Hot Latin Songs (Billboard) | 27 |

== Certifications ==
Certifications for "Tulum"
| Region | Certification | Certified units/sales |
|---|---|---|
| Mexico (AMPROFON) | Diamond+2× Platinum+Gold | 1,050,000^{‡} |
^{‡} Sales+streaming figures based on certification alone.
