= Nueva Vida (Peso Pluma song) =

- Bandidos version cover

Song by Peso Pluma

from the album Génesis
- Language: Spanish
- Released: 22 June 2023
- Genre: Regional Mexican
- Length: 3:10
- Label: Double P
- Songwriter: José Antonio Martinez Oviedo
- Producers: Ernesto Fernández; Jesús Iván Leal Reyes; Peso Pluma

Lyric video
- "Nueva Vida" on YouTube

"Nueva Vida" is a song by Mexican musician Peso Pluma. It was released on 22 June 2023, through Double P Records, as part of his third studio album Génesis (2023). Written by José Antonio Martinez Oviedo, it is a cover version of Sucesión M's song of the same name. It peaked at number 86 on the Billboard Hot 100 and is part of the soundtrack of the Mexican TV series Bandidos (2024).

== Background and release ==
In June 2023, Peso Pluma announced the release date of his third studio album Génesis and revealed its official tracklist, where "Nueva Vida" was featured as its 12th track. Released on 22 June 2023, "Nueva Vida" debuted at number 86 on the Billboard Hot 100 and number 17 on the US Hot Latin Songs charts. He later performed the song for his Amazon Music Gallery Session, while it was also used on the first episode of the Mexican TV series Bandidos (2024), with a slight modification of a lyric, "siempre bien pendiente mi compita Rulas".

== Charts ==
=== Weekly charts ===
Weekly chart performance for "Nueva Vida"
Chart (2023)	Peak position
Global 200 (Billboard)	172
Mexico (Billboard)	24
US Billboard Hot 100	86
US Hot Latin Songs (Billboard)	17

=== Year-end charts ===
Year-end chart performance for "Nueva Vida"
Chart (2023)	Position
US Hot Latin Songs (Billboard)	55

== Certifications ==
Certifications for "Nueva Vida"
Region	Certification	Certified units/sales
Mexico (AMPROFON)	Diamond+3× Platinum	1,120,000^{‡}
United States (RIAA)	47× Platinum (Latin)	2,820,000^{‡}
^{‡} Sales+streaming figures based on certification alone.
