= Plebada =

Single by El Alfa and Peso Pluma

from the album El Rey del Dembow
- Language: Spanish
- English title: "Plebade"
- Released: 8 June 2023
- Recorded: 2023
- Genre: Dembow
- Length: 3:42
- Label: El Jefe
- Songwriters: Emanuel Herrera Batista; Chael Eugenio Betances; Hassan Emilio Kabande Laija
- Producers: El Alfa; Chael Produciendo

El Alfa singles chronology
"Rico Feo" (2023)	"Plebada" (2023)	"La Gringa" (2023)

Peso Pluma singles chronology
"Peso Pluma: Bzrp Music Sessions, Vol. 55" (2023)	"Plebada" (2023)	"Tulum" (2023)

Music video
- "Plebada" on YouTube

"Plebada" (in English: Plebade) is a song recorded by the Dominican rapper El Alfa and the Mexican singer and rapper Peso Pluma. It was released on 8 June 2023. It is the first collaboration between the said singers.

The song was written by the singers with Chael Eugenio Betances, while production was in charge by El Alfa and Chael Produciendo.

== Background ==
After the success by Pluma of his "Bzrp Music Sessions #55" with Bizarrap, a week later, El Alfa announced "Plebada" was to be released on 8 June 2023.

== Music video ==
The music video was released simultaneously with the single on 8 June 2023.

== Charts ==
Chart performance for "Plebada"
Chart (2023)	Peak position
Global 200 (Billboard)	129
US Billboard Hot 100	68
US Hot Latin Songs (Billboard)	12
