= Las Morras =

Single by Peso Pluma and Blessd

from the album Génesis (Deluxe)
- Language: Spanish
- Released: 4 April 2023
- Genre: Regional Mexican; urbano; corridos tumbados
- Length: 2:35
- Label: Warner Music Colombia; Prajin Parlay; Worms Music; JM World; Cigol
- Songwriters: Hassan Emilio Kabande Laija; Jesús Roberto Laija García; Stiven Mesa Londoño
- Producer: Iván Leal

Peso Pluma singles chronology
"Chanel" (2023)	"Las Morras" (2023)	"El Tsurito" (2023)

Blessd singles chronology
"Fendi & Valentino" (2023)	"Las Morras" (2023)	"Verano" (2023)

Music video
- "Las Morras" on YouTube

"Las Morras" is a song performed by Mexican singer and rapper Peso Pluma and Colombian rapper Blessd. The song was released on 4 April 2023, through Warner Music Colombia, Prajin Parlay, and Cigol Music Group, as the second single for the deluxe version of Peso Pluma's album Génesis. A music video was uploaded on the same day of its release.

The song was written by both singers along with Jesús Roberto Laija García, and was produced by Iván Leal.

== Composition ==
The lyrics are about living high life, in which both singers trade verses and mix Mexican slang and Colombian slang. The song also combines regional Mexican music and corridos tumbados with hip hop and trap music.

== Music video ==
An official music video for the single was released on 4 April 2023 to Peso Pluma’s official YouTube Page. Filmed in Medellín, Colombia, the music video starts with Peso Pluma sitting in a black office chair as he counts US dollar bills, and it fades to Blessd sitting in a chair inside a parking garage while he vapes. The video features models in lingerie counting money and both singers dancing and singing together and alone respectively. At certain points of the music video both artists are seen getting their own Las Morras tattoos, which would later be used as the song’s official cover.

== Chart performance ==
"Las Morras" did not chart on the Billboard Hot 100 but peaked at number two on the Bubbling Under Hot 100 chart and number 97 on the Global 200. It also charted on the Mexico Songs and Hot Latin Songs, peaking at number 17 and number 19, respectively.

== Charts ==
Chart performance for "Las Morras"
Chart (2023)	Peak position
Global 200 (Billboard)	97
Mexico (Billboard)	17
US Bubbling Under Hot 100 (Billboard)	2
US Hot Latin Songs (Billboard)	19
