= Génesis (Peso Pluma album) =

Studio album by Peso Pluma
- Released: 22 June 2023
- Genres: Regional Mexican; corridos tumbados; urban sierreño
- Length: 54:10
- Labels: Double P; Prajin; The Orchard
- Producers: Hassan Emilio Kabande Laija; Jesús Iván Leal Reyes; Ernesto Fernandez; George Prajin; Roberto Tito Laija; Ernesto Murillo; Miguel de Jesús Ruiz Huerta; Darey Castro; Edgardo Nuñez; Gabito Ballesteros; Jasiel Nuñez; Edgar Barrera

Peso Pluma chronology
Sembrando (2022)	Génesis (2023)	Éxodo (2024)

Singles from Génesis
- 1. "PRC" Released: 24 January 2023; 2. "Las Morras" Released: 4 April 2023; 3. "Rosa Pastel" Released: 26 April 2023; 4. "77" Released: 5 May 2023; 5. "Bye" Released: 26 May 2023; 6. "Tulum" Released: 29 June 2023; 7. "Lagunas" Released: 7 July 2023; 8. "Lady Gaga" Released: 20 July 2023

Génesis is the third (Note: Though Peso Pluma has considered Génesis to be his debut studio album, various publications have referred to it as his third studio album, including Ah y Qué? (2020) and Efectos Secundarios (2021) as its predecessors.) studio album by Mexican singer Peso Pluma, released through Double P Records on 22 June 2023. It contains collaborations with Jasiel Nuñez, Junior H, Eladio Carrión, Natanael Cano, Blessd, Tito Double P, Edgardo Nuñez, Los Dareyes de la Sierra, Luis R. Conriquez, Gabito Ballesteros, and Grupo Frontera.

Three consecutive singles from the standard version of the album were released, "Rosa Pastel" with Núñez, "77" with Carrión, and the solo single "Bye". Its deluxe edition, which was released on 29 June 2023, adds two previously released singles,—"PRC" with Cano and "Las Morras" with Blessd—as well as the additional track "Tulum" with Grupo Frontera. "Lagunas" and "Lady Gaga" were released as singles in July 2023.

Génesis received positive reviews by critics and debuted at number three on the US Billboard 200 with 73,000 album-equivalent units, making it the highest-charting regional Mexican album ever in the chart's history and the highest-charting album by a Mexican artist. It won Best Música Mexicana Album (including Tejano) at the 2024 Grammy Awards, becoming Pluma's first Grammy win.

== Background ==
After having finished the year 2022 and started 2023 with several hits on world charts, Pluma and his team made the announcement of his third studio album on 14 June 2023, showing the album cover as well as the track list and featured artists. Pluma said that he had been working on the album "of all Mexican music" for a year and "producing it for a while".

The singer told Billboard: "I want my album to be welcomed by people, I want it to have the same airplay as the singles... I'm showing people another part of La Doble P."

== Promotion ==
A one-minute video which starred by the American boxer Mike Tyson was released by Peso Pluma, as an announcement of the album's release. Tyson previously declared himself an admirer of Pluma's music. Visualizers and lyric videos for each song off the album were also published on the singer's official YouTube channel. On 29 June 2023, a deluxe version of the album was released, which included an unpublished song called "Tulum" recorded with Grupo Frontera and two songs that had already been singles in previous months: "PRC" with Natanael Cano and "Las Morras" with Blessd.

=== Singles ===
In the beginning of 2023, "PRC" with Natanael Cano was released on 24 January 2023, as the lead single for the deluxe edition. It peaked at No. 33 on the Billboard Hot 100 and number two on US Hot Latin Songs; it also charted on Hits of the World charts. "Las Morras" with Blessd was released on 4 April 2023, as the second single for the deluxe edition. It peaked at No. 2 on US Billboard Bubbling Under Hot 100 and No. 19 on US Hot Latin Songs.

Three singles from the standard edition of the album were released consecutively. "Rosa Pastel" with Jasiel Nuñez was released on 20 April 2023, as the lead single for the standard version and is the first music release under Peso Pluma's label, Double P Records. It became Nuñez's first appearance on the Billboard Hot 100, peaking at No. 93. It also peaked at No. 20 on US Hot Latin Songs. "77" with Eladio Carrión was released on 5 May 2023, as the second single for the standard edition. It peaked at No. 6 on the US Billboard Bubbling Under Hot 100 and No. 27 on US Hot Latin Songs. "Bye" was released on 20 April 2023, as the third single for the standard edition and is Pluma's first solo single since his 2021 single "Por Las Noches." It peaked at No. 48 on the Billboard Hot 100 and No. 7 on US Hot Latin Songs.

On the same day of the deluxe edition's release, which was 29 June 2023, "Tulum" with Grupo Frontera would released as the third single for it, with its music video being surprise-released the same day. It peaked at No. 43 on the Billboard Hot 100 and No. 6 on US Hot Latin Songs. "Lagunas" with Jasiel Nuñez was released on 7 July 2023, as the fourth single for the standard edition and seventh overall, with its music video being released the same day. It peaked at No. 77 on the Billboard Hot 100 and No. 16 on US Hot Latin Songs. "Lady Gaga" with Gabito Ballesteros and Junior H was released on 20 July 2023, as the fifth single for the standard edition and eighth and final single overall. It peaked at No. 35 on the Billboard Hot 100 and atop US Hot Latin Songs.

== Critical reception ==
Professional ratings
Review scores
Source	Rating
AllMusic	4/5 stars

Andrew Sacher of BrooklynVegan highlighted the album as a notable release of the week and wrote that the songs are "primarily fueled by fiery acoustic guitars, insistent horns, and only minimal percussion, and Peso Pluma tops it off with a voice and a knack for melody that are both truly addictive" and that he sustains how "distinct and ear-catching he always sounds" on other artists' tracks across 14 of his own. Lucas Villa of Spin found that on Génesis, Pluma "channels his rebellious swagger into a feisty collection of songs pushing corridos into the mainstream – and the future", singling out "77" for being a "knockout" and "bélico" ("badass"). Anamaria Sayre of NPR called it "really exciting to see how [Pluma is] pushing the genre" of corridos tumbados "forward but in really subtle ways. He's not abandoning it. He's insisting that regional is really here to stay".

== Commercial performance ==
Due to Génesis being released on the afternoon of 22 June 2023, which was hours before the end of the tracking week, it debuted at No. 35 and No. 10 on the US Top Latin Albums and Regional Mexican Albums charts on the issue dated 1 July 2023, respectively, with 3,000 album-equivalent units. It also debuted at No. 19 on the US Heatseekers Albums chart in the same week. After its next full tracking week, it peaked atop both charts and debuted at No. 3 on the US Billboard 200 with an additional 73,000 album-equivalent units, on the issue dated 8 July 2023. The album became the highest-charting regional Mexican album in the chart's history, and the third album in the genre to reach the top 10 on the Billboard 200. It also became the highest-charting album by a Mexican artist, surpassing Luis Miguel's Cómplices, which reached No. 10.

Following the release of Génesis in June 2023, Peso Pluma continued to gain popularity on streaming platforms. According to Spotify, he became the first artist to grow from 2 million to 50 million monthly listeners in less than a year. His album Génesis also became his best-selling release according to ChartMasters, with approximately 8.5 million equivalent album sales and 7.6 billion Spotify streams as of October 2026.

== Track listing ==
Track listing
No.	Title	Writer(s)	Producer(s)	Length
1.	"Rosa Pastel" (with Jasiel Núñez)	Jasiel Nuñez	George Prajin; Ernesto Fernandez; Peso Pluma; Jesús Iván Leal Reyes “Parka”; Tito Double P	3:24
2.	"Luna" (with Junior H)	Hassan Emilio Kabande Laija	Reyes; Fernandez; Pluma	2:43
3.	"77" (with Eladio Carrión)	Carlos Humberto Esquerra Ramirez; Hassan Emilio Kabande Laija; Eladio Carrion	Prajin; Reyes; Fernandez; Pluma	3:35
4.	"Rubicon"	Luis Ernesto Vega Carvajal; Hassan Emilio Kabande Laija	Pluma; Reyes	3:58
5.	"Carnal" (with Natanael Cano)	Jesús Roberto Laija García	Reyes; Fernandez; Pluma	2:54
6.	"Las Morras" (with Blessd)	Hassan Emilio Kabande Laija; García; Stiven Mesa Londoño	Reyes	2:35
7.	"Gavilán II" (with Tito Double P)	Jesús Roberto Laija García	Reyes; Tito Double P	3:45
8.	"VVS" (with Edgardo Nuñez and Los Dareyes de la Sierra)	Darey Castro; Esau Ortiz Azuara; Francisco Oliva Castillo	Nuñez; Castro; Fernandez; Pluma	2:42
9.	"Su Casa" (with Luis R. Conriquez)			2:18
10.	"Lady Gaga" (with Gabito Ballesteros and Junior H)			3:32
11.	"Zapata"			2:57
12.	"PRC" (with Natanael Cano)	Hassan Emilio Kabande Laija; García; Natanael Cano	Prajin; Reyes; García	3:04
13.	"La People" (with Tito Double P)			2:33
14.	"Nueva Vida"			3:10
15.	"Tulum" (with Grupo Frontera)	Andres Correa Rios; Edgar Barrera; Hassan Emilio Kabande Laija; Rene Basabe	Barrera	3:29
16.	"Lagunas" (with Jasiel Nuñez)			3:51
17.	"Bye"			3:32
Total length:				54:02

== Charts ==
=== Weekly charts ===
Weekly chart performance for Génesis
Chart (2023)	Peak position
Spanish Albums (Promusicae)	31
US Billboard 200	3
US Independent Albums (Billboard)	1
US Regional Mexican Albums (Billboard)	1
US Top Latin Albums (Billboard)	1

=== Year-end charts ===
2023 year-end chart performance for Génesis
Chart (2023)	Position
US Billboard 200	37
US Independent Albums (Billboard)	6
US Regional Mexican Albums (Billboard)	1
US Top Latin Albums (Billboard)	3

2024 year-end chart performance for Génesis
Chart (2024)	Position
US Billboard 200	19
US Independent Albums (Billboard)	2
US Regional Mexican Albums (Billboard)	1
US Top Latin Albums (Billboard)	2

== Certifications ==
Certifications for Génesis
Region	Certification	Certified units/sales
Mexico (AMPROFON)	Diamond+Platinum+Gold	910,000^{‡}
United States (RIAA)	3× Platinum	3,000,000^{‡}
^{‡} Sales+streaming figures based on certification alone.

== See also ==
- 2023 in Latin music
- List of number-one Billboard Latin Albums from the 2020s
