= Lady Gaga (song) =

Single by Peso Pluma, Gabito Ballesteros and Junior H

from the album Génesis
- Language: Spanish
- Released: 20 July 2023
- Genre: Regional Mexican; urban sierreno; corrido tumbado
- Length: 3:32
- Label: Double P; Prajin Parlay
- Songwriters: Alexis Armando Fierro Román; Gabriel Ballesteros Abril
- Producer: Ballesteros

Peso Pluma singles chronology
"Quema" (2023)	"Lady Gaga" (2023)	"Feria en el Sobre" (2023)

Gabito Ballesteros singles chronology
"La Nena" (2023)	"Lady Gaga" (2023)	"La Pelinegra" (2023)

Junior H singles chronology
"Cuerno Mío" (2023)	"Lady Gaga" (2023)	"El Patrocinador" (2023)

Music video
- "Lady Gaga" on YouTube

"Lady Gaga" is a song by regional Mexican music singers Peso Pluma, Gabito Ballesteros and Junior H. It was written by Alexis Armando Fierro Román and co-written and produced by Ballesteros. It was released on 22 June 2023 as part of Pluma's third studio album Génesis and was released on July 20 as the album's eighth and final single. The song takes its name from the mention in its lyrics of the Rosé Lady Gaga drink champagne, a collaboration by Dom Pérignon and American singer Lady Gaga released in 2021. The lyrics also refer to the luxurious life and a lot of money.

== Critical reception ==
The song received mostly positive reviews, in which the media highlighted it above the other songs on the album even without being released as an official single. Music site Pitchfork wrote: "(the song) puts a spin on the classic corrido with references to Grand Theft Auto, Instagram and influencer culture." The publication also described it as "a 'sad boy' southern rap song about how money can buy everything, plus a genuine connection (between the singers)". The Sónica site named it as the "song of the summer".

== Commercial performance ==
At the time the Génesis was published on digital platforms, the song was the one that stood out the most in streaming.

== Promotion ==
=== Lyric video ===
The lyric video was posted on 23 June 2023 along with other lyric videos that premiered simultaneously with the release of Génesis (2023).

=== Audio visualizer ===
The audio visualizer video was also released on 23 June 2023 along with other audio visualizers that were released simultaneously with the release of Génesis (2023).

=== Music video ===
An official video clip was posted on 20 July 2023 on Peso Pluma's YouTube channel. The video was directed by Fernando Lugo and produced by Fabiana Olive. Since its premiere, it has been ranked #1 in trends on YouTube Mexico.

== Charts ==
=== Weekly charts ===
Weekly chart performance for "Lady Gaga"
Chart (2023)	Peak position
Bolivia (Billboard)	24
Ecuador (Billboard)	17
Global 200 (Billboard)	13
Mexico (Billboard)	1
US Billboard Hot 100	35
US Hot Latin Songs (Billboard)	1

=== Year-end charts ===
2023 year-end chart performance for "Lady Gaga"
Chart (2023)	Position
Global 200 (Billboard)	137
US Hot Latin Songs (Billboard)	16
US Streaming Songs (Billboard)	54

2024 year-end chart performance for "Lady Gaga"
Chart (2024)	Position
Global 200 (Billboard)	170
US Hot Latin Songs (Billboard)	22

== Certifications ==
Certifications for "Lady Gaga"
Region	Certification	Certified units/sales
United States (RIAA)	5× Diamond (Latin)	3,000,000^{‡}
^{‡} Sales+streaming figures based on certification alone.
