= 77 (Peso Pluma and Eladio Carrión song) =

Single by Peso Pluma and Eladio Carrión

from the album Génesis
- Language: Spanish
- Released: 5 May 2023
- Genre: Regional Mexican; urban sierreño; Latin trap; corridos tumbados
- Length: 3:35
- Label: Double P; Rimas
- Songwriters: Hassan Emilio Kabande Laija; Eladio Carrión Morales; Carlos Humberto Esquerra Ramirez
- Producers: George Prajin; Kabande Laija; Ernesto Fernandez; Jesus Ivan Leal Reyes

Peso Pluma singles chronology
"Rosa Pastel" (2023)	"77" (2023)	"Bye" (2023)

Eladio Carrión singles chronology
"Triste Verano" (2023)	"77" (2023)	"Andando" (2023)

Music video
- "77" on YouTube

"77" is a song performed by Mexican singer and rapper Peso Pluma and American reggaeton rapper Eladio Carrión. It was released on 5 May 2023, through Double P Records and Rimas Entertainment, as the second single for Peso Pluma's album Génesis. The song was written by both singers along with Carlos Humberto Esquerra Ramirez.

== Commercial performance ==
The song did not manage to chart on the Billboard Hot 100, instead peaking at number 6 on the Bubbling Under Hot 100 chart and number 26 on the Hot Latin Songs chart.

== Promotion ==
=== Music video ===
A music video for the song was uploaded on Peso Pluma's official YouTube channel on May 8, 2023.

=== Lyric videos ===
Two different versions of lyric videos for "77" were uploaded on Pluma's YouTube channel. The first version was uploaded on May 5, 2023, which was uploaded simultaneously with the song's release. and the second version was uploaded on June 22, 2023, along with the other lyric videos with the release of Génesis.

=== Visualizer ===
A visualizer for the song was uploaded on June 22, 2023, along with the other visualizers with the release of Génesis.

== Charts ==
Chart performance for "77"
Chart (2023)	Peak position
US Bubbling Under Hot 100 (Billboard)	6
US Hot Latin Songs (Billboard)	27
