= Junior H =

Mexican singer-songwriter (born 2001)

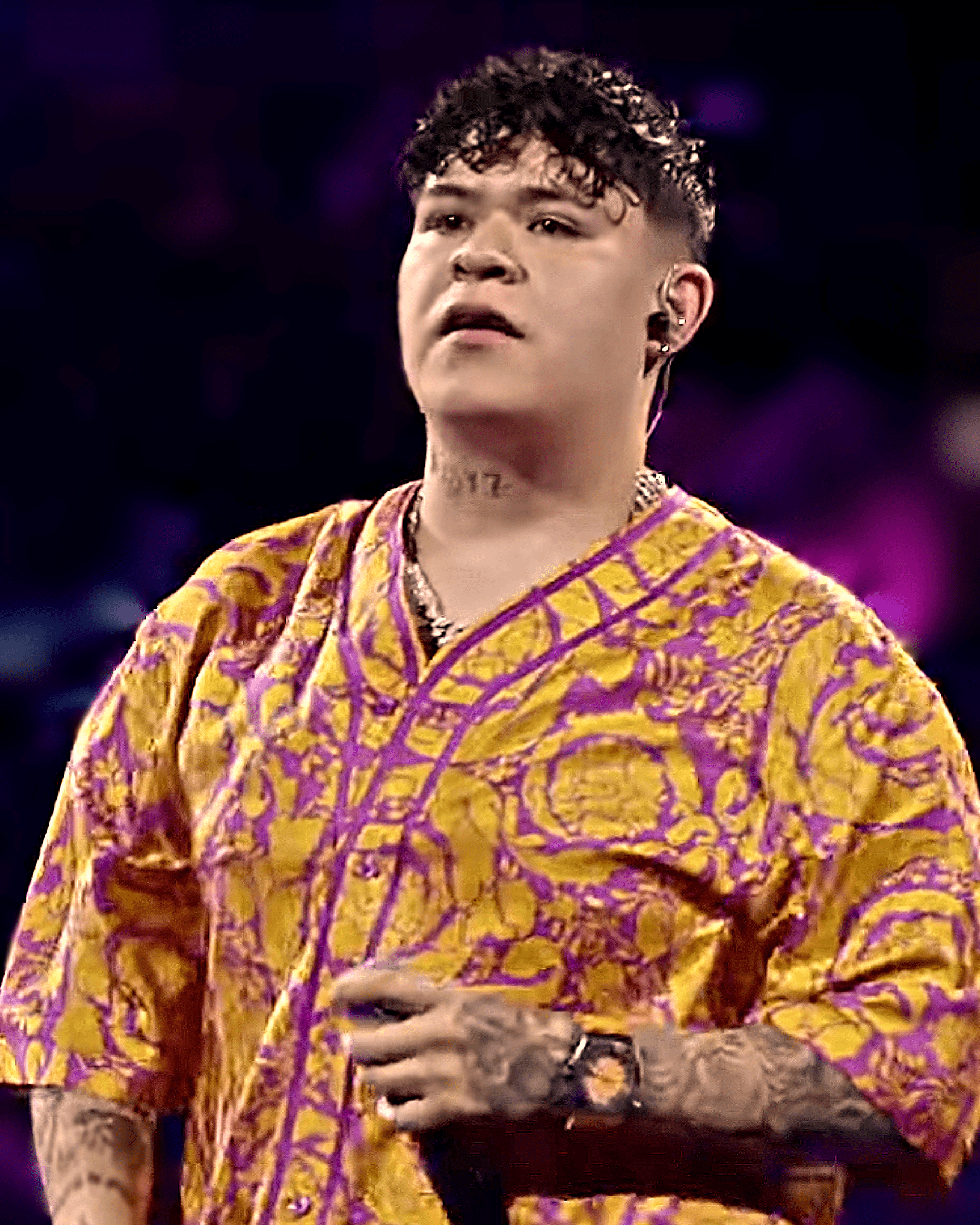
- Junior H in 2022
- Born: Antonio Herrera Pérez; 23 April 2001 (age 25); Cerano, Guanajuato, Mexico
- Occupations: Singer; songwriter
- Years active: 2019–present
- Musical career
- Genres: Regional Mexican; urban sierreño; corridos tumbados; Latin trap; Latin urban; reggaeton
- Instruments: Guitar; vocals
- Labels: Rancho Humilde; Warner Latina

Antonio Herrera Pérez (born 23 April 2001), known professionally as Junior H, is a Mexican singer-songwriter. He is considered a major artist of the corridos tumbados genre, having popularized the genre with his earlier studio albums.

== Early life ==
Antonio Herrera Pérez was born on 23 April 2001, in the municipality of Yuriria, Guanajuato, Mexico. At the age of 12, he and one of his friends would begin to write lyrics since they did not know how to play instruments yet. He lived his childhood in Cerano until the age of 15 when he and his family moved to the United States in 2015, in the state of Utah. At the age of 17, while in high school, he worked as a cook at a local Wendy's restaurant and learned to play different instruments during his spare time, by watching videos on YouTube, including the accordion and the guitar.

One day, Pérez decided to upload songs he had already made on YouTube under the name "Junior H," without telling any of his friends or family. Having not checked for a month on the songs he had uploaded, out of curiosity, he checked his songs on YouTube and upon seeing that his single "No Eh Cambiado" had more than two million views and several supportive comments, he put more focus on his independent musical project.

== Career ==
=== 2019–2020: Music career beginnings ===
On 2 February 2019, Herrera released his debut album Mi Vida en un Cigarro, with nine songs. Among them was his first renowned single "No Eh Cambiado" and other songs such as "Mi Vida en un Cigarro" and "El de la Chevy". Contacted by Jimmy Humilde that same year, he joined Humilde's record label Rancho Humilde, where he met labelmate Natanael Cano, who is also a Mexican singer, with whom he collaborated on the single "Disfruto lo Malo" on his acclaimed album Corridos Tumbados, which also includes "Ella", a song that Herrera had written by himself.

In December 2020, Herrera released his second studio album titled Atrapado en un Sueño, which features his most recognized songs such as its title track "Atrapado en un Sueño", "Mente Positiva" and "Jueves 10". The album was positioned in the top five of the Billboard Top Latin Albums chart, marking Herrera's first chartings in any album chart. Later that year, on September 2, he would release two albums that same day, Cruisin' with Junior H and Musica <3, which contain 12 songs on each album. On December 18, together with Natanael Cano and Ovi, they released the album Las 3 Torres, including 16 songs which feature artists such as Snoop Dogg, Ñengo Flow and Snow Tha Product.

=== 2021–2022: Further career ===
On 12 February 2021, Herrera released $ad Boyz 4 Life, with 16 songs, whose lyrics talk about love and heartbreak. In less than 24 hours, the album managed to position itself in the top spot of Apple Music's Latin Albums chart. Some of his recognized songs from the album are "La Bestia", "160 Gramos", "Me Consume", and a cover of Enanitos Verdes' hit single "Lamento Boliviano". On 7 February 2022, he announced and revealed the tracklist of his seventh studio album titled Mi Vida en un Cigarro 2, in reference to the name of his first album, which was officially released on February 11.

Months later, Herrera announced that he was working on a new album, but it contained Latin trap songs, which would be his first and only album of that genre, said Herrera himself. In October, he revealed the release date of his album, which would be 11 November, although days later he changed it to a later date that would be the official one, 23 November of that same year. At the end of 2022, the album would be released as Contingente, which also consists of collaborations with other well-known artists such as Alemán, Big Soto, Ovi, Paloma Mami, and Snow Tha Product.

=== 2023–present: $ad Boyz 4 Life II ===
In January 2023, Herrera released the single "Fin de Semana" with Oscar Maydon, which debuted on the Billboard Hot 100 on number 86, making it both artists' first time appearing in the chart. In February, Herrera collaborated with Mexican musician and singer Peso Pluma on "El Azul", which marked both artists' first collaboration. Herrera and Peso Pluma became frequent collaborators and had collaborated on "El Tsurito", "Lady Gaga," "Luna", and "Bipolar". "Lady Gaga" had peaked at number one on the Mexico Songs and Hot Latin Songs charts, making this Junior H's first number one debut on both charts. On 7 July, Junior H collaborated with reggaeton artist Rauw Alejandro, on the song "Picardía", from Alejandro's album Playa Saturno. In 14 September, he and norteño group Grupo Frontera, released the single "En Altavoz", from the group's debut album, El Comienzo. On 6 October, Junior H released his eighth studio album $ad Boyz 4 Life II, in which Herrera refers it as "more of an accident" since there were supposedly going to be featured artists in the album. In 3 November, Junior H and Grupo Marca Registrada released "Mafiosa", marking it both artists' second collaboration. On 13 November 2023, Junior H appeared on El Alfa's album El Rey del Dembow, on the song "Aqui Ta Smoke", alongside Pop Smoke.

== Artistry ==
Junior H is known for being one of the most important figures of the corridos tumbados subgenre, along with Natanael Cano, which are also referred as trap corridos. He also incorporates elements of Latin trap and reggaeton in his music, though the singer's debut on the latter genre would be on "Picardía" with Rauw Alejandro. The title for his Latin trap album Contingente was chosen because he thought it would be the last time the singer created any album in those genres.

The lyrics Junior H writes are about what is influential and what is devastating, usually relationships, in which music with such lyrics is often referred as urban sierreño or sad sierreño, a genre inspired by Ariel Camacho. In the song "1004 Kilómetros", taken from the singer's album $ad Boyz 4 Life, the lyrics are about and are dedicated to Junior H's mom, who lived 1004 kilometers away from him at the time. The lyrics represent a long-distance relationship.

Spanish rappers Yung Beef and C. Tangana and Mexican rapper Alemán have said that they've listened to Junior H's music. Bad Bunny once posted himself on an Instagram story listening to a Junior H song.

== Discography ==
=== Studio albums ===
List of studio albums, with selected details, chart positions, and certifications
Title	Studio album details	Peak chart positions			Certifications
Title	Studio album details	US	US Latin	MEX Reg.	Certifications
Mi Vida en un Cigarro	Released: 31 May 2019; Label: Self-released; Format: Digital download, streaming	—	—	—	
Atrapado en un Sueño	Released: 27 March 2020; Label: Rancho Humilde; Format: Digital download, streaming	—	5	2	
Cruisin' with Junior H	Released: 2 September 2020; Label: Warner Music Latina, Rancho Humilde; Format: Digital download, streaming	—	10	1	RIAA: 9× Platinum (Latin)
Musica <3	Released: 2 September 2020; Label: Warner Music Latina, Rancho Humilde; Format: Digital download, streaming	—	—	3	RIAA: 2× Platinum (Latin)
$ad Boyz 4 Life	Released: 12 February 2021; Label: Warner Music Latina, Rancho Humilde; Format: Digital download, streaming	192	5	1	RIAA: 3× Platinum (Latin); AMPROFON: Platinum
Mi Vida en un Cigarro 2	Released: 11 February 2022; Label: Warner Music Latina, Rancho Humilde; Format: Digital download, streaming	138	4	1	RIAA: 8× Platinum (Latin)
Contingente	Released: 23 November 2022; Label: Warner Music Latina, Rancho Humilde; Format: Digital download, streaming	—	36	—	RIAA: Platinum (Latin); AMPROFON: Platinum+Gold
$ad Boyz 4 Life II	Released: 5 October 2023; Label: Warner Music Latina, Rancho Humilde; Format: Digital download, streaming	14	2	2	RIAA: 16× Platinum (Latin); AMPROFON: Diamond+3× Platinum

=== Collaborative albums ===
List of collaborative albums with selected details
Title	Studio album details	Peak chart positions			Certifications
Title	Studio album details	US	US Latin	MEX Reg.	Certifications
Las 3 Torres (with Natanael Cano and Ovi)	Released: 18 December 2020; Label: Warner Music Latina, Rancho Humilde; Format: Digital download, streaming	—	—	—	RIAA: Platinum (Latin); AMPROFON: Gold
DEP</3$$ED MFKZ (with Gael Valenzuela)	Released: 12 February 2026; Label: Warner Music Latina, Rancho Humilde; Format: Digital download, streaming	15	3	1	

=== Singles ===
List of singles, with selected chart positions, certifications, and album name
Title	Year	Peak chart positions				Certifications	Album
Title	Year	MEX	US	US Latin	WW	Certifications	Album
"No Eh Cambiado"	2019	—	—	—	—		Mi Vida en un Cigarro
"Vivo a Mi Manera"	2019	—	—	—	—		Non-album single
"En Mis Dedos un Gallito"	2019	—	—	—	—		Delincuencia Organizada
"El de la H"	2019	—	—	—	—		Non-album singles
"Paso en Culiacán" (with Natanael Cano)	2020	—	—	—	—		Non-album singles
"La Bestia"	2021	—	—	—	—	RIAA: 2× Platinum (Latin)	$ad Boyz 4 Life
"Disfruto Lo Malo" (with Natanael Cano)	2021	—	—	24	—		Corridos Tumbados
"Ella" (with Natanael Cano)	2021	—	—	29	—		Corridos Tumbados
"Empresa Fly Club"	2021	—	—	—	—		Mi Vida en un Cigarro 2
"Naci Para Amarte"	2021	—	—	—	—		Mi Vida en un Cigarro 2
"12 Rifles"	2022	—	—	—	—		Non-album singles
"El Hijo Mayor"	2022	21	—	41	—	RIAA: 17× Platinum (Latin)	Non-album singles
"El Plumas (En Vivo)"	2022	—	—	—	—		Non-album singles
"Vamos Para Arriba" (with Gabito Ballesteros)	2022	—	—	32	—	RIAA: 13× Platinum (Latin)	Non-album singles
"El Rescate" (with Grupo Marca Registrada)	2022	8	— (Note: "El Rescate" did not enter the Billboard Hot 100, but peaked at number 24 on the Bubbling Under Hot 100 chart.)	18	153	RIAA: Gold (Latin)	Don't Stop the Magic
"Ojos Tumbados" (with Alto Linaje)	2022	—	—	—	—	RIAA: Platinum (Latin)	Non-album singles
"El Pana" (with Compa Steve)	2022	—	—	—	—		Non-album singles
"Loco Enamorado" (with Edgardo Nuñez)	2022	—	—	30	—	RIAA: 4× Platinum (Latin)	Non-album singles
"Intenciones Malas" (with Dan Sanchez)	2022	—	—	—	—		Non-album singles
"En Paris" (with El Chachito)	2022	14	—	25	—	RIAA: Gold	Non-album singles
"Fin de Semana" (with Oscar Maydon)	2023	4	86	10	58		Non-album singles
"El Azul" (with Peso Pluma)	2023	3	55	8	23	RIAA: 42× Platinum (Latin)	Non-album singles
"Ya Corazón" (with Gabito Ballesteros)	2023	24	—	—	—		Non-album singles
"Tronando Ligas" (with Grupo Firme)	2023	—	—	—	—		Non-album singles
"El Tsurito" (with Peso Pluma and Gabito Ballesteros)	2023	15	— (Note: "El Tsurito" did not enter the Billboard Hot 100, but peaked at number six on the Bubbling Under Hot 100 chart.)	23	127	RIAA: 14× Platinum (Latin)	Non-album singles
"Abcdario" (with Edén Muñoz)	2023	8	— (Note: "Abcdario" did not enter the Billboard Hot 100, but peaked at number nine on the Bubbling Under Hot 100 chart.)	24	84		Non-album singles
"Lady Gaga" (with Peso Pluma and Gabito Ballesteros)	2023	1	35	1	13		Génesis
"Cuerno Mio" (with Oscar Maydon)	2023	—	—	—	—	RIAA: Platinum (Latin)	Non-album singles
"El Patrocinador" (with Grupo Firme)	2023	—	—	—	—	RIAA: Platinum (Latin)	Non-album singles
"Bipolar" (with Peso Pluma and Jasiel Nuñez)	2023	12	60	7	86		Non-album singles
"En Altavoz" (with Grupo Frontera)	2023	—	—	37	—		El Comienzo
"Skin de Bandida" (with Oscar Maydon and Gabito Ballesteros)	2023	24	—	50	—		Distorsión
"Guerreros Aztecas"	2023	—	—	—	—		Non-album single
"Y Lloro"	2023	8	79	11	77	RIAA: 19× Platinum (Latin)	$ad Boyz 4 Life II
"Mafiosa" (with Grupo Marca Registrada)	2023	—	—	—	—		Non-album singles
"Rompe la Dompe" (with Peso Pluma and Oscar Maydon)	2023	4	81	12	51		Non-album singles
"A Tu Manera" (with Peso Pluma)	2024	11	— (Note: "A Tu Manera" did not enter the Billboard Hot 100, but peaked at number three on the Bubbling Under Hot 100 chart.)	12	128	RIAA: 3× Platinum (Latin)	Non-album singles
"La Durango" (with Peso Pluma and Eslabón Armado)	2024	5	75	2	83		Éxodo
"Volver al Futuro" (with Óscar Maydon)	2024	1	—	13	69	AMPROFON: Platinum+Gold	Non-album single

=== Other charted and certified songs ===
List of songs, with selected chart positions and certifications, showing year released and album name
Title	Year	Peak chart positions				Certifications	Album
Title	Year	MEX	US	US Latin	WW	Certifications	Album
"Mente Positiva"	2020	—	—	31	—		Atrapado en un Sueño
"La Vi Llorar"	2020	—	—	49	—		Cruisin' with Junior H
"Se Amerita"	2020	—	—	—	—	AMPROFON: 2× Diamond+Gold; RIAA: 19× Platinum (Latin)	Cruisin' with Junior H
"Verdes Verdes" (with Ovi and Natanael Cano)	2020	—	—	—	—	RIAA: Platinum (Latin)	Las 3 Torres
"Los 4 Ases" (with Ovi, Natanael Cano, and Herencia de Patrones)	2021	—	—	—	—	RIAA: Platinum (Latin)	Retumban2
"Los Botones Azules" (with Luis R. Conriquez)	2021	17	—	20	—	AMPROFON: Diamond; RIAA: 21× Platinum (Latin)	Mi Vida en un Cigarro 2
"Extssy Model"	2021	—	—	49	—		Mi Vida en un Cigarro 2
"Dos Morritas" (with Eslabón Armado)	2022	—	— (Note: "Dos Morritas" did not enter the Billboard Hot 100, but peaked at number 21 on the Bubbling Under Hot 100 chart.)	28	—		Nostalgia
"Mejor Acabar" (with Eslabón Armado)	2023	—	—	50	—		Desvelado
"Luna" (with Peso Pluma)	2023	5	30	5	23		Génesis
"Eres" (with Natanael Cano)	2023	17	—	—	—		Nata Montana
"Picardía" (with Rauw Alejandro)	2023	—	—	43	—	AMPROFON: Platinum	Playa Saturno
"$ad Boyz II"	2023	13	— (Note: "$ad Boyz II" did not enter the Billboard Hot 100, but peaked at number four on the Bubbling Under Hot 100 chart.)	19	169		$ad Boyz 4 Life II
"Rockstar"	2023	10	— (Note: "Rockstar" did not enter the Billboard Hot 100, but peaked at number 11 on the Bubbling Under Hot 100 chart.)	26	193	RIAA: Diamond (Latin)	$ad Boyz 4 Life II
"Serpiente"	2023	—	—	36	—		$ad Boyz 4 Life II
"La Cherry"	2023	—	— (Note: "La Cherry" did not enter the Billboard Hot 100, but peaked at number 18 on the Bubbling Under Hot 100 chart.)	31	—		$ad Boyz 4 Life II
"Miéntele"	2023	—	—	45	—		$ad Boyz 4 Life II
"Las Noches"	2023	—	—	40	—		$ad Boyz 4 Life II
"Tres Botellas"	2023	—	—	43	—		$ad Boyz 4 Life II
"Miles de Rosas"	2023	—	—	47	—		$ad Boyz 4 Life II
"Piénsalo"	2023	20	—	50	—		$ad Boyz 4 Life II
"Mientres Duermes"	2023	—	— (Note: "Mientres Duermes" did not enter the Billboard Hot 100, but peaked at number 19 on the Bubbling Under Hot 100 chart.)	10	193		$ad Boyz 4 Life II
"Un Desperdicio" (with Rels B)	2024	8	—	49	134	AMPROFON: Platinum	A New Star (1993)
"5–7" (with Tito Double P)	2024	22	—	43	—		Incómodo

=== Guest appearances ===
List of non-single guest appearances, with other performing artists, showing year released and album name
Title	Year	Other artist(s)	Album
"Una Cheyenne 90"	2019	Jasiel Ayon	Delincuencia Organizada
"Delincuencia Organizada"	2019	Colocho y su Eminencia and Jasiel Ayon	Delincuencia Organizada
"Meditando"	2019	Saúl Nol and Jasiel Ayon	Delincuencia Organizada
"Pues Bien"	2019	—	Delincuencia Organizada
"La M4"	2019	—	Corridos Tumbados
"El AK"	2019	—	Corridos Tumbados
"Buenos Ratos"	2019	Natanael Cano	Corridos Tumbados
"Seca Tus Lagrimas"	2020	Natanael Cano	Corazon Tumbado
"Ojos de Maniaco"	2020	Legado 7	Duetos Con la Clika
"Diez Segundos"	2020	Natanael Cano	Corridos Tumbados, Vol. 2
"Para Andar Agusto"	2020	Natanael Cano and Juanillo Diaz	Corridos Tumbados, Vol. 2
"Aqui Estoy"	2020	Nueva Era	Corridos Tumbados, Vol. 2
"Dices Que Cambiado"	2020	Porte Diferente	Es Diferente
"Te Extraño"	2020	Ovi	Buen Viaje
"Los 4 Ases (Corrido Tumbado)"	2021	Ovi, Natanael Cano, and Herencia de Patrones	Retumban2
"El F"	2021	Natanael Cano	A Mis 20
"El Terre"	2021	Alemán	Huracán
"Mochila"	2022	Natanael Cano	NataKong
"Whiskey Con Agua"	2022	Fuerza Regida	Pa Que Hablen
"Aqui Ta Smoke"	2023	El Alfa and Pop Smoke	El Rey del Dembow
"Aquellos Botones"	2024	Luis R. Conriquez	Corridos Bélicos, Vol. IV

== Awards and nominations ==
Award	Year	Category	Nominated work	Result	Ref.
Billboard Latin Music Awards	2021	Regional Mexican Artist of the Year	Junior H	Nominated	
Billboard Latin Music Awards	2021	Regional Mexican Album of the Year	Atrapado En Un Sueño	Nominated	
Billboard Latin Music Awards	2022	Regional Mexican Artist of the Year, Solo	Junior H	Nominated	
Billboard Latin Music Awards	2022	Regional Mexican Album of the Year	Mi Vida En Un Cigarro 2	Nominated	
Billboard Latin Music Awards	2023	Hot Latin Songs Artist of the Year, Male	Junior H	Nominated	
Billboard Latin Music Awards	2023	Regional Mexican Artist of the Year, Solo	Junior H	Nominated	
Billboard Latin Music Awards	2024	Regional Mexican Artist of the Year, Solo	Junior H	Nominated	
Billboard Latin Music Awards	2024	Hot Latin Songs Artist of the Year, Male	Junior H	Nominated	
Billboard Latin Music Awards	2024	Artist of the Year	Junior H	Nominated	
Billboard Latin Music Awards	2024	Top Latin Albums Artist of the Year, Male	Junior H	Nominated	
Billboard Latin Music Awards	2024	Streaming Song of the Year	"Lady Gaga" (with Peso Pluma & Gabito Ballesteros)	Nominated	
Billboard Latin Music Awards	2024	Hot Latin Song of the Year, Vocal Event	"Lady Gaga" (with Peso Pluma & Gabito Ballesteros)	Nominated	
Billboard Latin Music Awards	2024	Regional Mexican Album of the Year	$ad Boyz 4 Life II	Nominated	
Billboard Latin Music Awards	2024	Top Latin Album of the Year	$ad Boyz 4 Life II	Nominated	
Billboard Music Awards	2024	Top Latin Album	$ad Boyz 4 Life II	Nominated	
Billboard Music Awards	2024	Top Latin Male Artist	Junior H	Nominated	
Billboard Music Awards	2024	Top Latin Artist	Junior H	Nominated	
Premios Tu Música Urbano	2022	Top Artist – Regional Mexican Urban	Junior H	Nominated	
Premios Tu Música Urbano	2022	Top Song – Regional Mexican	"Los 4 Ases (Corrido Tumbado)" (with Ovi, Natanael Cano, and Herencia de Patrones)	Nominated	
Premios Tu Música Urbano	2023	Top Artist – Regional Mexican Urban	Junior H	Nominated	
