= PRC (song) =

2023 single by Peso Pluma and Natanael Cano

Single by Peso Pluma and Natanael Cano

from the album Génesis (Deluxe)
- Language: Spanish
- Released: January 24, 2023
- Genre: Regional Mexican, sierreño, corrido tumbado
- Length: 3:04
- Label: Prajin Records, Rancho Humilde, Los CT
- Songwriters: Hassan Emilio Kabande Laija, Jesús Roberto Laija García, Nathanahel Rubén Cano Monge
- Producers: George Prajin, Laija García, Iván Leal Reyes

Peso Pluma singles chronology
"Delivery" (2022)	"PRC" (2023)	"Igualito a Mi Apá" (2023)

Natanael Cano singles chronology
"Lavadachi" (2022)	"PRC" (2023)	"Don Chon" (2023)

Music video
- "PRC" on YouTube

"PRC" (abbreviation of "Polvo, ruedas y cristal"; English: "Powder, wheels and crystal") is a song by regional Mexican musicians and singers Peso Pluma and Natanael Cano. It was released as a single on January 24, 2023, through Prajin Records, Rancho Humilde and Los CT, as the lead single for the deluxe version of the former's album Génesis (2023).

Lyrically, it is organized crime apologia, which deals with a man who is dedicated to selling drugs and the luxuries that leave him to dedicate that to himself. The song title makes references to crack cocaine (polvo), MDMA (ruedas) and methamphetamine (cristal).

The song peaked at number 33 on the US Billboard Hot 100 and number two on the Mexico Songs chart.

== Music video ==
A music video was uploaded on January 26, 2023, two days after the song's release, through Peso Pluma's official YouTube channel. The video was directed by Barush and produced by George Prajin. In the first week after the video's release, it was positioned in the top 10 trending songs in Mexico on YouTube. As of November 2023, the music video has over 191 million views.

== Live performances ==
The song was included in the set of songs played on Peso Pluma's Doble P Tour. Peso Pluma performed the song on April 20, 2023, as a guest at Becky G's performance at the Coachella Valley Music and Arts Festival, also performing their song "Chanel".

== Charts ==
=== Weekly charts ===
Chart performance for "PRC"
Chart (2023)	Peak position
Bolivia (Billboard)	21
Colombia (Billboard)	23
Ecuador (Billboard)	21
Global 200 (Billboard)	21
Mexico Songs (Billboard)	2
US Billboard Hot 100	33
US Hot Latin Songs (Billboard)	4

=== Year-end charts ===
Year-end chart performance for "PRC"
Chart (2023)	Position
Global 200 (Billboard)	93
US Billboard Hot 100	90
US Hot Latin Songs (Billboard)	8

== Certifications ==
Certifications for "PRC"
Region	Certification	Certified units/sales
Mexico (AMPROFON)	Diamond	700,000^{‡}
United States (RIAA)	4× Platinum (Latin)	240,000^{‡}
^{‡} Sales+streaming figures based on certification alone.
