= Siempre Pendientes =

Single by Peso Pluma and Luis R. Conriquez
- Language: Spanish
- English title: "Always Ready"
- Released: August 15, 2022
- Genre: Regional Mexican; Sinaloan sierreño; corrido belico
- Length: 3:06
- Label: Prajin; Kartel; Worms
- Songwriter: Roberto "Tito" Laija
- Producers: Peso Pluma; George Prajin; Jesús Iván leal; Tito Laija; Ernesto "Neto" Fernandez

Peso Pluma singles chronology
"30 Tiros" (2022)	"Siempre Pendientes" (2022)	"El Gavilán" (2022)

Luis R. Conriquez singles chronology
"El Dinero No Me Cambia" (2022)	"Siempre Pendientes" (2022)	"La Loquera" (2022)

Music video
- "Siempre Pendientes" on YouTube

"Siempre Pendientes" is a song by Mexican singer and rappers Peso Pluma and Luis R. Conriquez. It was released on August 15, 2022, through Prajin Parlay, Kartel Music, and Worms Music and was written by Peso Pluma's cousin, Roberto "Tito" Laija.

After the song's release, it attained controversy. The song would possibly be part of a series of death threats sent to Peso Pluma, who praises Mexican drug lord Joaquín "El Chapo" Guzmán in his songs, forcing him to cancel his October 14, 2023 show in Tijuana.

== Lyrics ==
Lyrically, it is apologia for drug trafficking and organized crime. The lyrics in the song mention El Chapo or his son, Iván Archivaldo Guzmán Salazar, using his initials "JGL" or "Don Iván" and are directed to the Sinaloa Cartel and the rivals of the Jalisco Cartel. They are further mentioned in following single "El Gavilán".

== Music video ==
A music video was originally released on the same day of release, on YouTube. It was directed by César Acosta and it stars both artists holding rifles in a desert with a large crew, receiving 2 million views in its first 24 hours. The video was removed from the video platform three days later due to outrage.

== Charts ==
Chart performance for "Siempre Pendientes"
Chart (2023)	Peak position
Global 200 (Billboard)	174
Mexico (Billboard)	9
US Bubbling Under Hot 100 (Billboard)	11
US Hot Latin Songs (Billboard)	27

== Certifications ==
Certifications for "Siempre Pendientes"
Region	Certification	Certified units/sales
Mexico (AMPROFON)	4× Platinum	560,000^{‡}
United States (RIAA)	5× Platinum (Latin)	300,000^{‡}
^{‡} Sales+streaming figures based on certification alone.
