= Bye (Peso Pluma song) =

Single by Peso Pluma

from the album Génesis
- Language: Spanish
- Released: 26 May 2023
- Genre: Regional Mexican; Urban sierreno; Corridos tumbados
- Length: 3:32
- Label: Double P; Prajin Parlay
- Songwriters: Hassan Emilio Kabande Laija; Jasiel Núñez; José Antonio Martínez Oviedo
- Producers: Kabande Laija; Iván Leal

Peso Pluma singles chronology
"77" (2023)	"Bye" (2023)	"Peso Pluma: Bzrp Music Sessions, Vol. 55" (2023)

Music video
- "Bye" on YouTube

"Bye" is a song recorded and performed by the Mexican regional music singer Peso Pluma. The song was written by Jasiel Núñez, José Antonio Martínez Oviedo and by the singer, who also produced it together with Iván Leal. It was released on 26 May 2023 as the third single from Pluma's third studio album Génesis, the release was through Double P Records, the label that Peso Pluma founded. The song is his first solo single since 2021, when he released "Por Las Noches".

== Critical reception ==
Upon release, the song received mostly positive reviews from Spanish-speaking media. The Regueton.com site published: "“Bye” is yet another example of his talent and versatility (of Peso Pluma), consolidating his position as one of the most outstanding figures within the Corridos Tumbados genre". The Mexican newspaper Milenio called it a "heartbreak" song. the Spanish digital newspaper Okdiario named it as "his most sincere and personal song" describing it as: "much more intimate and with a slower melody than his previous releases". Lucía Coca from the site Los 40 Urban expressed: "Bye talks about a breakup, and he does it with cutting verses and lyrics loaded with pain and a lot of emotion" concluding that "it could become a ballad completely different from the others".

== Commercial performance ==
On its opening day, the song received close to 5 million views on YouTube and entered the global top 200 on Spotify at number 92 with 1.5 million streams on that platform, which was the fastest growing song in streaming that day. Due to this, it was in the first places of trends in different social networks. The song debuted at number 53 on the Billboard Hot 100 chart the week of June 4, marking the ninth entry to that list and extending his record as the Mexican soloist with the most entries to it. It also debuted at number 56 on the Global 200.

== Music and lyrics ==
Musically, the song is a lying down corrido with arrangements of sierreña music and the sound of the bajo sexto and trumpet that characterizes the singer. Lyrically, it talks about a love break between two people who hurt each other. The lyrics includes, "Bye / Mejor sigue tu camino / Mientras fumo y tomo vino / Que estar contigo ya no me convino / Bye / Y ya me da igual que la neta / Me distraigo con princesas / Y a mi tus besos ya no me interesan / Bye".

== Promotion ==
=== Music video ===
The release of the single was accompanied by the publication of its music video on the singer's official YouTube channel, the video was recorded in an arid area of Tepeyahualco, Puebla. It was directed by Edgar Nito, produced by Pirotecnia Films and starred by the singer and television celebrity Dania Méndez. The video clip accumulated 10 million views in its first 3 days of release and ranked 3rd in trends on YouTube Mexico the first days of publication.

=== Lyric video ===
The lyric video premiered on 23 June 2023 along with other lyric and visualizer videos that premiered simultaneously with the release of Génesis.

=== Visualizer ===
The audio visualizer was released simultaneously with other lyric videos and audio visualizers with the release of Génesis on 23 June 2023.

== Charts ==
Chart performance for "Bye"
Chart (2023)	Peak position
Global 200 (Billboard)	45
Mexico (Billboard)	9
US Billboard Hot 100	48
US Hot Latin Songs (Billboard)	7
