= Rosa Pastel (Peso Pluma and Jasiel Nuñez song) =

Single by Peso Pluma and Jasiel Nuñez

from the album Génesis
- Language: Spanish
- Released: 20 April 2023
- Genre: Regional Mexican; corridos tumbados
- Length: 3:24
- Label: Double P; Prajin Parlay
- Songwriter: Jasiel Nuñez
- Producers: Nuñez; Peso Pluma; George Prajin; Ernesto Fernandez; Roberto "Tito" Laija; Jesús Iván Leal

Peso Pluma singles chronology
| "El Tsurito" (2023) | "Rosa Pastel" (2023) | "77" (2023) |

Jasiel Nuñez singles chronology
| "Vibras" (2023) | "Rosa Pastel" (2023) | "Epa" (2023) |

Music video
- "Rosa Pastel" on YouTube

"Rosa Pastel" (transl. "Pink Cake") is a song performed by Mexican corridos singer and rapper Peso Pluma and Mexican singer Jasiel Nuñez. It was released on 20 April 2023, as the lead single for Peso Pluma's album Génesis. The song was written and produced by Jasiel Nuñez; it was also produced by Peso Pluma, George Prajin, Ernesto Fernandez, Roberto "Tito" Laija, and Jesús Iván Leal.

== Background and release ==
A week before the release of "Rosa Pastel", Peso Pluma and Eslabon Armado "made history" as their song "Ella Baila Sola" had charted on the Billboard Hot 100, reaching the top 10 and marking the first time a regional Mexican song had appeared in the region.

The release of "Rosa Pastel", along with its accompanying music video, marked the official launch of Peso Pluma's record label, Double P Records, in partnership with the Prajin Parlay label. Jasiel Nuñez, Peso Pluma's cousin Tito Laija, known as Tito Double P, and Raul Vega were the first artists signed into the label. The song is also the first release under the label.

The song would appear on Peso Pluma's album Génesis, as the first track on the album.

== Lyrics ==
The song's lyrics are about the use of drugs, life struggles, and achieving fame. In the line "En mi cabeza siempre mi papá / Saludos pal boss que está junto a Dios," Peso Pluma looks back on his dad, about his recent success. The song title "Rosa Pastel" is a reference to pink cocaine and is referenced in the following lyrics: "Como se dice: "mijo hagale pues" / Ahí va una onza de Rosa Pastel / Pa’ que sepan que ya me enloqué."

== Chart performance ==
"Rosa Pastel" debuted at number 93 on the Billboard Hot 100 and number 123 on the Billboard Global 200. It also debuted on number 19 and number 20 on Mexico Songs and Hot Latin Songs, respectively.

== Charts ==
Chart performance for "Rosa Pastel"
| Chart (2023) | Peak position |
|---|---|
| Global 200 (Billboard) | 123 |
| Mexico (Billboard) | 19 |
| US Billboard Hot 100 | 93 |
| US Hot Latin Songs (Billboard) | 20 |

== Certifications ==
Certifications for "Rosa Pastel"
| Region | Certification | Certified units/sales |
|---|---|---|
| Mexico (AMPROFON) | Diamond+Platinum+Gold | 910,000^{‡} |
| United States (RIAA) | 11× Platinum (Latin) | 660,000^{‡} |
^{‡} Sales+streaming figures based on certification alone.
