= Peso Pluma =

Mexican singer (born 1999)

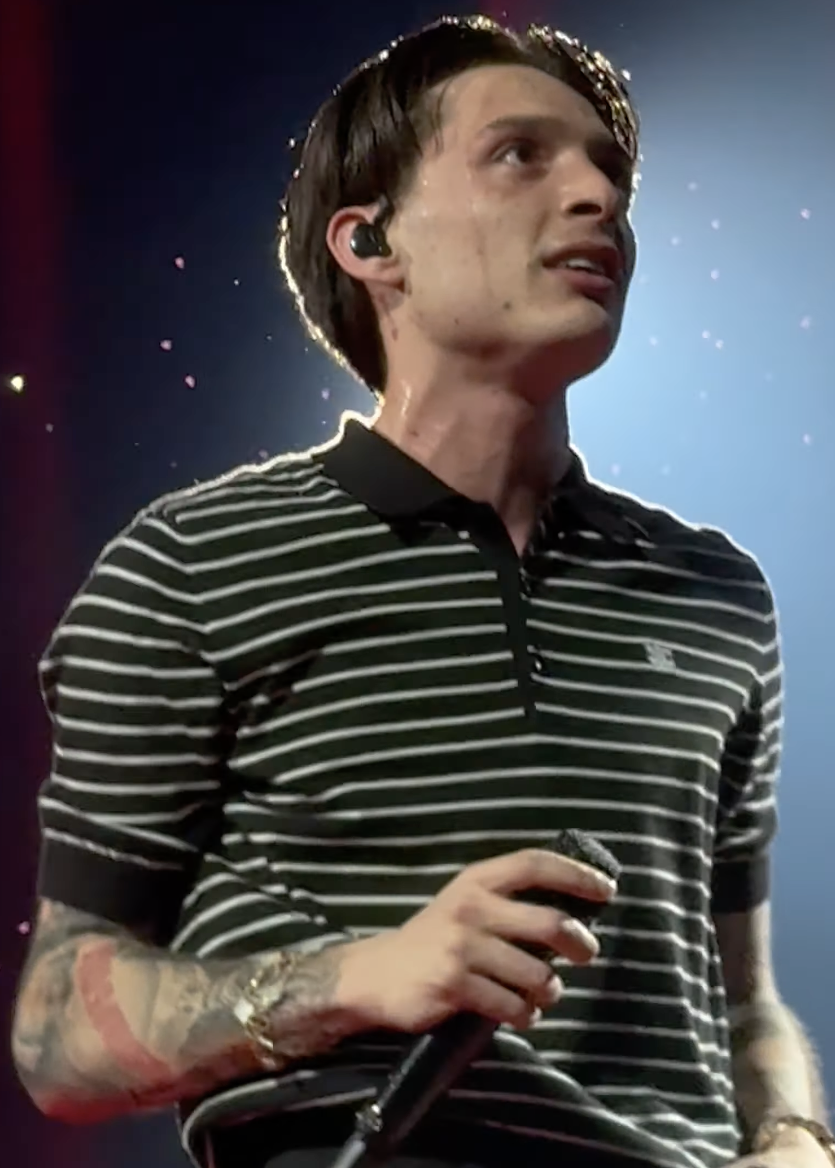
- Peso Pluma at Arena Monterrey in 2024
- Born: Hassan Emilio Kabande Laija; 15 June 1999 (age 27); Zapopan, Jalisco, Mexico
- Other name: Doble P
- Education: Samuel Clemens High School
- Occupations: Singer; songwriter; record producer
- Years active: 2020–present
- Works: Discography
- Awards: Full list
- Musical career
- Genres: Regional Mexican; corridos tumbados; urban sierreño; reggaeton; Latin trap
- Instruments: Vocals; guitar
- Labels: El Cartel de Los Ángeles; Prajin; Worms; Double P
- Website: pesopluma.com

Hassan Emilio Kabande Laija (born 15 June 1999), known professionally as Peso Pluma, is a Mexican singer-songwriter, and record producer, recognised for his work in regional Mexican music, particularly corridos tumbados. Kabande began playing guitar in his teens and started writing songs influenced by regional Mexican styles. He achieved moderate recognition with his first two studio albums, Ah y Qué? (2020) and Efectos Secundarios (2021). He rose to fame with the singles "Por Las Noches" and the RIAA-certified "El Belicón" (with Raúl Vega). This success was followed by the EP Sembrando (2022) and the controversial "Siempre Pendientes" (with Luis R. Conriquez), which marked his first entry on the Billboard Global 200.

His collaborations with Natanael Cano, including "AMG" (with Gabito Ballesteros) and "PRC", went viral on TikTok and charted on the US Billboard Hot 100. During the week of 29 April 2023, his duet with Eslabón Armado, "Ella Baila Sola", became the first regional Mexican song to reach the top 10 of the Hot 100, peaking at No. 4. That same week, Kabande achieved a record-breaking eight simultaneous entries on the chart, the most ever for a Mexican artist. The song was also the fifth most-streamed globally on Spotify in 2023, with Kabande being the 5th most streamed artist of 2023.

His third studio album, Génesis (2023), earned him his first Grammy Award for Best Música Mexicana Album (including Tejano) and became his first album to reach the top 10 on the Billboard 200. His fourth studio album, the double album Éxodo (2024), debuted at No. 5 on the same chart, marking two consecutive top 10 albums in the US. Known for his distinctive fusion of Sinaloa-style sierreño corridos with Urbano music; specifically Latin hip hop and reggaeton, Kabande is considered a key figure in the revival of the corrido and is currently Mexico's most-streamed artist of all time.

== Life and career ==
Hassan Emilio Kabande Laija was born in Zapopan, Jalisco, to Hassan Kabande and Rubí Laija on 15 June 1999. The relatives of his mother were residents of Badiraguato, Sinaloa. Both parents were born in Mexico; his father was born in Chiapas and is of Lebanese descent. Growing up in Guadalajara, he began playing the guitar at age 15 by watching videos on YouTube. Kabande started writing songs in a diary, admitting to being ridiculed by peers. Describing his initial approach to songwriting, he explained how writing became his therapy: "That’s where I’d write how I was feeling, then I realized some stuff would rhyme. I kept practicing and became better with time."

=== 2020–2021: Career beginnings ===
After years of writing music together, Kabande worked with his cousin, fellow singer and songwriter, Roberto "Tito" Laija Garcia, also known as Tito Double P, on releasing two live albums, Disco en Vivo on 21 February 2020 and Disco en Vivo, Vol. 2 on 4 July. Published by the independent label El Cartel de los Ángeles, the collections consisted of recordings of his performances around Jalisco. In April 2020, he released his debut studio album, Ah y Qué? featuring twelve songs and collaborations with El Choforo, Lalo Reyes, and Jorge Morales El Jilguero. Kabande published his live recording with Decreto Real of "Relajado Voy" to streaming platforms on 7 October as his first single release. He followed up with the singles "Mil Historias" with Hector Rubio on 13 November and "El Petter" with Decreto Real on 4 December before deciding to work on a new body of work.

Kabande published his second studio album, Efectos Secundarios, on 19 March 2021, preceded by the singles "Con Dinero Baila el Perro" and "Lo Que Me Das", a music video for the latter, as well as songs with previous collaborators El Choforo and Hector Rubio. Focusing on building his sound, Kabande issued the single "Por Las Noches" on 11 June, a slowed-down sierreño track about an unintended breakup. Kabande's "Todo Es Playa", a song about smoking marijuana, was his last single with El Cartel de los Ángeles before he switched labels to Prajin Records under George Prajin. To mark this shift, the singer published the socio-political track "Spiral" on 25 November.

=== 2022: Breakthrough ===
On 4 February 2022, Kabande teamed up with Raul Vega on the single "El Belicón", a corrido anthem on the local narcoculture. Working on-hand with the song's production, Kabande and Vega played the roles of members of a drug cartel for the song's music video directed by Barush, instantly going viral among locals. The track gained momentum after its usage in TikTok and Instagram, with its music video racking 10 million views on YouTube in one month and gaining a lot of playlisting on Spotify. In April, "El Belicón" debuted at number 50 on Billboard Hot Latin Songs, peaking at number 46 two weeks after and becoming Kabande's first entry on the charts.

Kabande released Sembrando, an extended play containing "Signal" with five new songs, on 20 April in celebration of his fans and the recreational holiday. A six-part thematic and fictional story, the singer explained how the EP was recorded simultaneously, with themes "specifically for that day (420)". Upon its release, the EP was credited on solidifying the singer's contribution on the rise of corridos tumbados, a fusion of regional Mexican elements with trap music. He teamed up with Tornillos and Polo Gonzales on the song "Sentosa" for the Latin American esports division of Garena Free Fire. On 3 June, the singer published "30 Tiros", an acoustic corrido about his success story, along with an accompanying music video directed by Barush surrounded by women and luxuries.

The singer collaborated with Luis R. Conriquez on the song "Siempre Pendientes" released on 15 August. The track immediately attracted controversy among news outlets for glorifying labour for drug lord Joaquín "El Chapo" Guzmán, containing the lyrics "JGL, traigo en las cachas orgullosamente" and "Cuido la plaza del señor Guzmán". A music video directed by Cesar Acosta starring Kabande and Conriquez holding rifles in the desert supported by a large crew was uploaded to YouTube upon its release, receiving two million views in its first 24 hours and being removed from the platform three days later due to public outrage. On 1 October, Kabande sang the song live onstage at the 8 Music Fest in Culiacán, serving as a replacement act for Junior H after his sudden cancelation from the event. In celebration of the city's 491st anniversary, an image of El Chapo was projected on screen for the entirety of his performance, attaining backlash from the audiences, organisers, the city council, and netizens for allegations of promoting drug trafficking. El Colectivo de Mujeres Activas Sinaloenses, A.C. (CMAS AC) publicly denounced the act, claiming how the performance went against the goal of the festivities to mark "the beginning of the end of drug culture in Culiacán". On the association's official Twitter account, they claimed accountability from municipal president Juan de Dios Gámez to apply sanctions on the singer "to guarantee non-repetition", attaching an excerpt of Article 254 of the Penal Code for the State of Sinaloa and indicating the application of up to two years in prison for the accusation. In defence, the city council declared that while it disapproved of the projection of the drug leader's image, the municipal authority was "in favour of the freedom of expression of all artists", also considering how the singer was a last-minute addition. Kabande's songs have also led to threats from the Jalisco New Generation Cartel, a rival to the Sinaloa Cartel.

In retrospect of the incident, Kabande defended himself in a 2023 interview with Pepe Garza on YouTube: "They tried to smear me there, but [it's] nothing that cannot be fixed. I kept going forward with my career." He denied rumours of actual connections to the cartel, clarifying, "I am an artist, and we do nothing more than appear on stage and sing what we write." The incident gave attention to the rise of the genre narcocorrido, which comprises ballads dedicated to themes of marijuana and the illegal drug trade. "Siempre Pendientes" peaked at No. 27 in Hot Latin Songs, 155 on the Global Excl. U.S., and No. 174 on the Global 200, becoming Kabande's first global hit in the Billboard charts. The track was the artist's first entry in Mexico Songs, debuting at No. 9 on the week dated 3 September and charting for 20 weeks. Kabande announced "El Gavilán" as his next single due on 21 October, working with Tony Aguirre and becoming his second collaboration with Conriquez. The song rose to No. 41 in Hot Latin Songs by the end of the year. On 18 November, he released "Ando Enfocado" with Jaziel Aviles and Codiciado.

Natanael Cano and Gabito Ballesteros co-released "AMG" with the singer on 24 November, marking the highly anticipated first collaboration of Cano and Kabande as forefront figures in the subgenre of corridos tumbados. Written by Tito about the path to success and named after the Mercedes-AMG G 63, a music video was uploaded on Cano's YouTube channel featuring the trio partying in the Mexican city nightlife, splicing in between footage of Mexican brass players. "AMG" debuted at No. 25 on Mexico Songs on 17 December. The singer partnered with Alemán on "Delivery" on 9 December, setting an experimental shift in his sound with the prominence of hip-hop beats. On 30 December, American regional Mexican band Fuerza Regida released their album Pa Que Hablen (2022), containing the track "Igualito a Mi Apá" with Kabande.

=== 2023: Mainstream success and Génesis ===
"AMG" climbed to No. 10 in Mexico Songs on the chart dated 14 January 2023 as the singer's first top-ten hit. The song rose to No. 3 in the following week after receiving placements on major playlists on Spotify, the premiere of the "Igualito a Mi Apá" music video directed by Miguel, and the announcement of a new collaboration between Kabande and Cano titled "PRC". With 5.8 million US streams, "AMG" debuted at No. 92 in the Billboard Hot 100 chart ending on 4 February, marking as the singer's first Hot 100 entry. "AMG" ascended to No. 10 on Hot Latin Songs and surged to number one on the Mexico Songs chart dated 25 February, becoming his first chart-topper. On 20 January, he began his nationwide tour for the year at the Camara Sonora in Guadalajara, Jalisco. He concluded the Mexican tour on 26 April to a sold-out audience at the Palenque ExpoGan in Hermosillo, Sonora.

Released on 23 January, "PRC" (short for polvo, ruedas y cristal) was written about the daily life of a gangster. The music video starred Cano and Kabande as dealers on the job, standing as the first music video uploaded directly on Kabande's official YouTube channel and gaining 10 million views in its first week of publication. Varied versions of the track's first line (Me levanto, un baño y luego me pongo a forjar) went viral on TikTok, along with a dance craze originally performed by Kabande in the music video, stirring controversy for being re-enacted by children and its implications. "PRC" served as Kabande's second Hot 100 hit on 18 February.

Kabande and Junior H co-released "El Azul" on 10 February, accompanied by a live performance video directed by Johnny Ragr. A war corrido about working for El Chapo using his infamous 701 moniker, the song made headlines after the line "Como el de aquellos botones" was censored by Spotify on late April for its allusion to the drug fentanyl. The song debuted at No. 15 on 4 March in Mexico Songs. On 27 February, Argentine rapper Nicki Nicole remixed "Por Las Noches", providing a new verse and additional vocals and adding a female perspective to the sierreño. A music video directed by Pepe Garrido was previewed on 2 March, starring Kabande and Nicole in a local bar taking turns singing the serenade as a distraught man cries in the background. After creating speculations on Nicole's breakup with rapper Trueno with the line "Todo lo que yo te di y todo lo que me diste, fue para nada", the remix fuelled the original version of the song's resurgence on the charts, appearing on the Hot 100 dated 25 March.

A collaboration with Colombian producer Ovy on the Drums titled "El Hechizo" was published on 9 March to rave reviews, together with a music video directed by Cristian Aguilar. Kabande's concert stop in León, Guanajuato on 11 March was postponed to 30 March after the organisers of his concert encountered issues with the logistics and local permit. The mishap created buzz for possibly being controlled by the authorities considering the singer's activism on narcoculture and his immense appeal among the city with the highest number of adolescents in Mexico living in poverty.

"Ella Baila Sola", a track performed by Kabande with the American group Eslabón Armado as the lead single from their sixth studio album, Desvelado, was officially released to streaming services on 16 March after initially premiering on TikTok. Written by the group's lead vocalist Pedro Tovar as a sierreño about friends spotting a beautiful girl on the dance floor, Tovar previewed the song to Kabande at an airport via a phone call. On 17 March, Kabande hopped on a remix for the 2021 Latin reggaeton single "La Bebé" by Mexican singer-songwriter Yng Lvcas, citing about wanting a sonic shift from his previous releases. Aiming to collaborate with a fellow Mexican artist, Lvcas recorded the song with the singer at Querétaro, releasing its music video on 23 March.

On 28 March, following its first full week of tracking, "Ella Baila Sola" debuted at No. 1 on both Latin Streaming Songs and Mexico Songs for the week ending on 1 April, becoming both artists' first number-one single on the latter. The song also debuted at No. 2 on Hot Latin Songs, No. 10 on Streaming Songs, and No. 26 on the Hot 100, acquiring 16 million official streams in the US during its first week. In the same period, the "La Bebé" remix charted at No. 77 on the Hot 100 with 6.8 million streams in the United States. With "AMG", "PRC", and "Por Las Noches" concurrently charting with the arrivals of "Ella Baila Sola" and "La Bebé", Kabande recorded the most Hot 100 Spanish-language entries for any Mexican artist. In celebration of his success, the singer announced the Doble P Tour across 17 cities in the United States.

Singer Becky G recruited Kabande for the single "Chanel" on 30 March as the first single for her regional Mexican album Esquinas. The collaboration, co-written by the duo with Tito and Grammy-winning producer Edgar Barrera, narrated the story of a failed relationship. Coinciding with the release of "Chanel", Kabande received updated Latin certifications from the Recording Industry Association of America, with "El Belicón" declared as 8× Platinum having 480,000 units sold, "Siempre Pendientes" as 5× Platinum with 300,000 units, and "PRC" as 4× Platinum with 240,000 sold. The music video for "Chanel" directed by Ricky Alvarez featuring its performers crooning in various minimalistic outdoor settings was published on 6 April.

Becky G brought Kabande onstage during her set in Coachella 2023 on 14 April for surprise performances of "Chanel" and "PRC". Seeing a rise in streams, "Ella Baila Sola" reached No. 1 on the daily chart of Spotify Top 50 - Global on 15 April, dethroning "Flowers" by Miley Cyrus. During the same period, the singer monopolized the top six of the Mexico Songs chart and placed five songs in the top ten of Hot Latin Songs chart, with "Ella Baila Sola" in the lead for both. On 17 April, Billboard announced that with their jump from 17 to 10, Kabande and Armado made history with "Ella Baila Sola" as the first regional Mexican top-ten song in the 64-year history of the Billboard Hot 100. "El Azul" entered the chart at No. 87, extending his record to sixth simultaneous Hot 100 entries.

In partnership with Prajin, Kabande launched his own independent record label named Double P Records on 20 April, signing artists Tito, Vega, and Jasiel Nuñez upon its public announcement. Aiming to propel the careers of its signees inside and outside of Mexico, he stressed that his label's goal relied on "making union, being grateful, and being humble". Serving as its chief executive officer and head of A&R, the singer released the track "Rosa Pastel" featuring Nuñez as his first single under the label to mark its foundation. At the 2023 Latin American Music Awards in Las Vegas, Nevada, Kabande joined Becky G onstage to sing "Chanel", signalling his first American televised performance.

On the weekly chart of Spotify Global dated 20 April, the singer became the first Mexican act to attain No. 1 with "Ella Baila Sola". According to Billboard on 24 April, "Ella Baila Sola" climbed 10–5 on the Hot 100 chart, eclipsing its previous record and emerging as the first regional Mexican top-five hit in the chart's history. "Chanel" and "Igualito a Mi Apá" debuted at No. 88 and No. 90 respectively, increasing his record to eight concurrent Hot 100 entries in a single week. During the timeframe, "Ella Baila Sola" also rose to No. 1 in the Global 200, the first leader in the chart for any Mexican song. To promote the song, Kabande was invited to perform at The Tonight Show Starring Jimmy Fallon on 29 April as the first regional Mexican performance ever on the show. The event was met with polarizing responses; while fans and Mexican audiences commended the rare achievement as the representation of regional Mexican music to a wider scope, critics questioned the absence of Eslabón Armado from the monumental feat and the possible romanticization of narcoculture. On 1 May, "Ella Baila Sola" peaked at No. 4 in the Hot 100. "AMG" became 7× Platinum with 420,000 units tracked by the RIAA as "El Azul" received 2× Platinum status.

Puerto Rican rapper Eladio Carrión collaborated with Kabande for the song "77" on 5 May. A track about living a luxurious life with an abundance of work, the music video was directed by Jose Ovi Jimenez and released on 9 May. On 13 May, Puerto Rican rapper Anuel AA teased on social media about an upcoming collaboration with Kabande, posting a photo with the singer guesting at the Inglewood stop of his Legends Never Die Tour to his Instagram account. Kabande released the solo track "Bye" on 26 May along with a music video directed by Edgar Nito. On 31 May, Argentine producer Bizarrap featured the singer on the fusion track "Bzrp Music Sessions, Vol. 55". In June 22, Kabande released his third studio album Génesis, which was supported by three singles, "Rosa Pastel", "77", and "Bye". Eight days after the album's release, Kabande released a deluxe version of Génesis, which adds three previously released singles, "PRC" with Natanael Cano, "Las Morras" with Blessd, and "Tulum" with Grupo Frontera.

In July 2023, Génesis peaked at No. 3 on the Billboard 200 charts, making it the highest-charting and fastest-selling regional Mexican album in Billboard history. In September 2023, Kabande became the first regional Mexican artist to perform at the MTV Video Music Awards. Later that month, Kabande cancelled a 14 October show in Tijuana, after he was threatened in a series of banners signed with the initials of the Jalisco New Generation Cartel. At the end of October, US singer Arcángel and Kabande released "La Chamba", which is the lead single on the former's fifth studio album. In November, Kabande released "Peligro", in promotion of the 2023 video game Call of Duty: Modern Warfare III and at the end of November 2023, the singer and Milo J released "Una Bala", which is part of Milo J's debut album 111. Days later, Brazilian singer Anitta collaborated with Kabande on "Bellakeo". Kabande would later release "Rompe la Dompe" with Junior H and Óscar Maydon, as the final single of 2023.

=== 2024–present: Éxodo ===
Through interviews and live performances from 2023, it was speculated that Kabande would release a collaborative EP with fellow singer Jasiel Nuñez in 2024, as well as his fourth studio album. Released as his first song of 2024, Kabande would collaborate with fellow singer Luis R. Conriquez on their third collaboration "Pixelados". Kabande was invited to the 2024 Viña del Mar International Song Festival, but his invitation was criticized for the artist's purported exaltation of narcoculture by Chilean public intellectual Alberto Mayol. Citing Mayol, councilor of Viña del Mar René Lues wrote an open letter petitioning alcalde Macarena Ripamonti to recall the invitation of Kabande for the festival. Following this, Chilean ministers of the interior and of justice, Carolina Tohá and Luis Cordero Vega joined the criticism of the invitation of Kabande. The criticism and potential cancellation of Kabande was widely covered by the international press.

In the later days of January 2024, the singer would release other singles as secondary artist, which appeared on the Billboard Hot 100, which include the dance-pop track "Igual que un Ángel" with Kali Uchis, and ranchera track "La Intención" with Christian Nodal. At the 66th Annual Grammy Awards, Kabande would win the award for Best Música Mexicana Album (including Tejano) for his third studio album Génesis (2023). In February 2024, after a video of the singer with another woman in Las Vegas spread around social media, Nicki Nicole officially announced that her and Kabande would break up, with most of their posts with each other being deleted. After both singers broke up, Kabande would release the bachata-infused song "A Tu Manera" with Junior H, with the Latin rap single "No Son Klle" with fellow Mexican rapper Santa Fe Klan and Argentine rapper Duki being released a week later.

Following the release of singles, Kabande announced his second headlining tour, Éxodo Tour, as well as his accompanying fourth studio album Éxodo which was revealed in an interview with Rolling Stone, where he also became the first Mexican artist to be on their front cover. He would collaborate with Tito Double P and Joel de la P on the sequel-track "La People II", which debuted at No. 69 on the Billboard Hot 100 making it both latter artists' first appearances on the chart. Kabande would also release a reggaeton track with Chencho Corleone titled "Humo". A day before his performance at 23rd Coachella Valley Music and Arts Festival, the singer would announce his second collaboration single with Arcángel titled "Peso Completo", and confirmed that it would be part of his album Éxodo. Kabande released a trailer featuring Irish professional MMA fighter Conor McGregor, which revealed the release date for Éxodo and another single titled "La Durango". He later joined DJ Snake on the electronic dance track "Teka" on 17 April 2024.

It was also speculated that he would collaborate with Junior H and Eslabón Armado after all three artists shared a short clip of an animated image with a song playing on Instagram. "La Durango" by all three artists was then released on 9 May 2024, and was performed with Pedro Tovar of Eslabón Armado on The Tonight Show Starring Jimmy Fallon. He collaborated with Gabito Ballesteros on the single "Sin Yolanda", which was released alongside the latter's debut album The GB as one of its singles on 24 May 2024. He then collaborated with American rapper Rich the Kid on "Gimme a Second", which was released on the same day as "Sin Yolanda". Later on the same day, Kabande revealed the cover art and tracklist for Éxodo, containing collaborations with Chino Pacas, Iván Cornejo, Cardi B, Quavo, among others. Éxodo debuted at No. 5 on the US Billboard 200 after its next full tracking week, with 64,000 album-equivalent units which only consisted of 87.51 million official streams within all 24 tracks. In addition, it also debuted atop the US Top Latin Albums and Regional Mexican Albums charts, earning his second number-one album on both charts.

"Vino Tinto", a collaborative song with Natanael Cano and Ballesteros from Éxodo, was released as its eighth single on 26 June 2024, and peaked at number four in Mexico. A collaboration with fellow Mexican singer Kenia Os, "Tommy & Pamela", and its music video were also released as the album's ninth single on 18 July 2024. On 8 August 2024, Kabande released the single "Los Cuadros" with his cousin Tito Double P, along with its music video. On the same day, he featured alongside US rapper Kodak Black on "Drunk", a track by hip hop supergroup ¥$, composed of US rapper Kanye West and singer Ty Dolla Sign, as part of a digital deluxe version of the group's collaborative album Vultures 2 (2024). On 22 August, he was featured on the track "Dos Días" by Tito Double P, from his debut album Incómodo (2024). On the same day, he was also featured on Puerto Rican rapper Myke Towers' album La Pantera Negra (2024), on the track "Se Te Nota".

Another track from Éxodo, "La Patrulla" with fellow Mexican singer-songwriter Netón Vega, and its music video, was released as its tenth single on 5 September 2024. In the wake of Hurricane Milton, Kabande cancelled his scheduled final two concert dates for the Éxodo Tour, 16 October at Amalie Arena in Tampa, Florida, and 17 October at Kaseya Center in Miami, with the tour concluding on 13 October in First Horizon Coliseum in Greensboro. Éxodo received a nomination to win the award for Best Música Mexicana Album (including Tejano) at the 67th Annual Grammy Awards, which took place in February 2025, making it Kabande's second Grammy nomination. On 7 November, he appeared on Double P Records signee Jasiel Nuñez's second studio album La Odisea (2024), appearing on the songs "California Sunset", "Amiri" alongside Tito Double P, and "En Mi Mundo", also he took part in Netón Vega album Mi Vida Mi Muerte with a duet named "Morena".

Peso Pluma closed out 2025 by formalising his long-running creative partnership with his cousin Tito Double P on their first joint studio album, Dinastía, released on 25 December 2025 through Double P Records. The collaboration was framed in press materials as a "family lineage" project that reunited the pair after Tito's early work as a songwriter within Peso Pluma's camp and later emergence as a solo artist on the Double P imprint, turning their familial relationship into an explicit artistic narrative about continuity and unity within música mexicana. The rollout began with teases and the release of "Intro" ahead of the album announcement, with Remezcla highlighting the project’s cinematic reveal (including luchador imagery) and positioning Dinastía as a statement release during an increasingly contested period for corridos' public reception.

In describing the album's production approach, Peso Pluma told Apple Music that the duo expanded the arrangement palette with additional instrumentation and new backing vocalists, including singers associated with Kanye West's Sunday Service Choir, leaning into sweeping, choral textures across parts of the project. Commercially, Dinastía debuted at No. 6 on the US Billboard 200 (dated 10 January 2026), becoming Tito Double P's first top-ten entry and extending Peso Pluma's run of high-charting releases. The album also opened at No. 1 on Billboard's Top Latin Albums chart, reflecting strong first-week demand in the US Latin market. Its tracks translated quickly into multi-territory single performance: "Dopamina" debuted on the US Billboard Hot 100 (Billboard charts reporting it as a new entry), while in Mexico it reached No. 1 on Billboard's Mexico Songs chart (dated 17 January 2026). In the United States, "Dopamina" also rose to a peak of No. 2 on the Hot Latin Songs chart and reached No. 1 on the Hot Regional Mexican Songs chart, signalling crossover traction beyond the album format and reinforcing the duo's position at the centre of the contemporary corridos-driven streaming economy.

== Artistry ==
The singer recalled, "I've always listened to reggaeton, hip-hop, and rap, but I realized that my voice was made to sing corridos because I would hear them played around family all the time. My voice shined differently there than in any other genre."

Kabande considered the late young Mexican singers Ariel Camacho and Valentín Elizalde as his primary influences for his sound, interpreting their songs at an early age. An avid listener of hip-hop music, he enlisted Canadian rapper Drake as his favourite artist, citing him as a reflection of growing up across borders. He has also referenced the Weeknd, 21 Savage, Post Malone, Suicideboys, and Shoreline Mafia as musical influences.

After becoming the top streamed artist in Mexico, several media outlets have compared the success of the singer with Puerto Rican artist Bad Bunny. In spite of this, Kabande has repeatedly acknowledged Bunny as a musical inspiration, conversing privately with the rapper while waiting for the set of Rosalía during Coachella 2023: "There are really only good things to say about him, and I have a lot of admiration and respect for him." Bunny posted to his Instagram Stories a video of himself and Kendall Jenner singing along to "AMG", officially debunking the rumoured conflict publicly.

In 2025, Kabande became the first Mexican ambassador of the Council of Fashion Designers of America (CFDA) for New York Fashion Week. He made his official debut at the CFDA cocktail event at Rockefeller Center, wearing a design by Willy Chavarría with styling by Anastasia Walker.

== Personal life ==
According to a report by El Gordo y la Flaca on 12 May 2023, Kabande purchased a 174 m^{2} apartment in the Andares district of Puerta de Hierro, Zapopan, for approximately MXN$14,400,000 (US$800,000), which serves as his official residence. He has expressed an interest in football; in his youth he played for the junior teams of C.D. Guadalajara, although he is a supporter of their city rivals, Atlas F.C.

=== Relationships ===
In July 2023, rumours circulated online that Kabande was dating Argentine singer Nicki Nicole. Nicole initially denied the speculation, stating that they were only friends, but later confirmed their relationship in November of that year. In February 2024, after the circulation of a video showing Kabande with another woman in Las Vegas, Nicole announced the end of their relationship.

In August 2024, Kabande confirmed that he was in a relationship with US influencer Hanna Howell, who had hinted at the romance in social media posts the previous month. In September, Howell announced their breakup, stating that Kabande had returned all of her belongings except for her pet dog.

In January 2025, speculation arose that Kabande was romantically involved with Mexican singer Kenia OS. The couple publicly confirmed their relationship in April 2025 during the Coachella festival. On 6 June 2026, Kabande announced on his Instagram that he and Kenia had mutually ended their relationship, stating that they ended on good terms.

== Discography ==
=== Studio albums ===
- Ah y Qué? (2020)
- Efectos Secundarios (2021)
- Génesis (2023)
- Éxodo (2024)
- Dinastía (2025)

=== Live albums ===
- Disco en Vivo (2020)
- Disco en Vivo, Vol. 2 (2020)

=== Extended plays ===
- Sembrando (2022)

== Tours ==
=== Headlining tours ===
- Doble P Tour (2023)
- Éxodo Tour (2024)
- DINASTÍA by Peso Pluma & Friends (2026)
