= List of awards and nominations received by Peso Pluma =

Peso Pluma awards and nominations
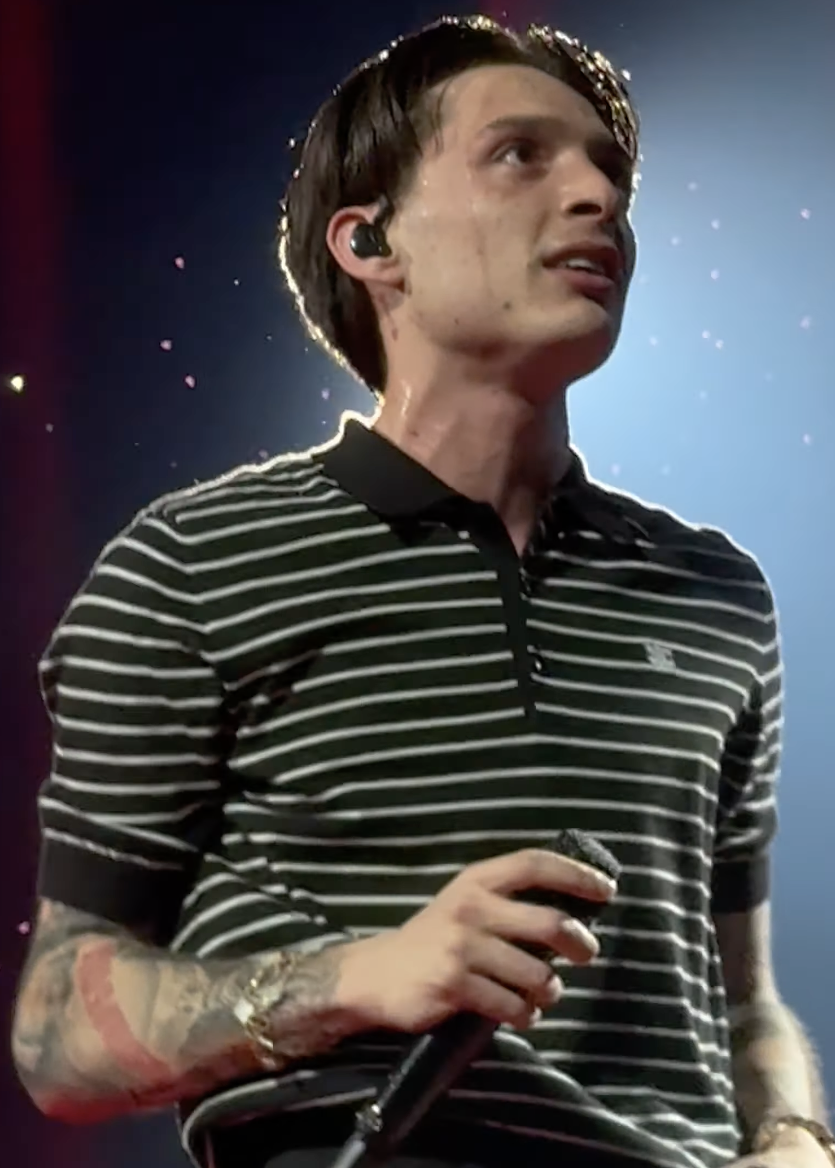
- Peso Pluma in September 2024
Awards and nominations
Award	Wins	Nominations

Totals (Note: Certain award groups do not simply award one winner. They acknowledge several different recipients, have runners-up, and have third place. Since this is a specific recognition and is different from losing an award, runner-up mentions are considered wins in this award tally. For simplification and to avoid errors, each award in this list has been presumed to have had a prior nomination.)
- Wins: 44
- Nominations: 125

Mexican singer Peso Pluma has received numerous awards and nominations throughout his career, recognizing his impact on Latin music, particularly in the regional Mexican and urbano genres. Since his breakthrough in 2023, he has received widespread acclaim, earning numerous accolades from prestigious award ceremonies. His viral success "Ella Baila Sola" (with Eslabon Armado), became the first regional Mexican song to enter the Billboard Hot 100's top 10 and earned him multiple awards, including Song of the Year at the 2023 Billboard Latin Music Awards and Premios Juventud. His third album, Génesis (2023), won the Grammy Award for Best Música Mexicana Album (2024), while its follow-up, Éxodo (2024), got a nomination.

At the 2023 Billboard Latin Music Awards, Peso Pluma was the most awarded artist, winning six awards, including New Artist of the Year, Hot Latin Songs Artist of the Year (Male), and Regional Mexican Artist of the Year. He repeated his success in 2024, winning Hot Latin Song of the Year for "Qlona" (with Karol G) and Songwriter of the Year. His crossover appeal has been recognized globally, with wins at the MTV Europe Music Awards (Best New Act, 2023; Best Latin, 2024) and nominations at the MTV Video Music Awards (Best New Artist, 2023; Best Latin, 2024).

== Awards and nominations ==
Award	Year	Category	Nominated work	Result	Ref.
Billboard Latin Music Awards	2023	Artist of the Year	Peso Pluma	Nominated	
Billboard Latin Music Awards	2023	New Artist of the Year	Peso Pluma	Won	
Billboard Latin Music Awards	2023	Hot Latin Songs Artist of the Year, Male	Peso Pluma	Won	
Billboard Latin Music Awards	2023	Global 200 Latin Artist of the Year	Peso Pluma	Nominated	
Billboard Latin Music Awards	2023	Regional Mexican Artist of the Year, Solo	Peso Pluma	Won	
Billboard Latin Music Awards	2023	Songwriter of the Year	Peso Pluma	Won	
Billboard Latin Music Awards	2023	Global 200 Latin Song of the Year	"Ella Baila Sola" (with Eslabon Armado)	Nominated	
Billboard Latin Music Awards	2023	Hot Latin Song of the Year	"Ella Baila Sola" (with Eslabon Armado)	Won	
Billboard Latin Music Awards	2023	Hot Latin Song of the Year, Vocal Event	"Ella Baila Sola" (with Eslabon Armado)	Won	
Billboard Latin Music Awards	2023	Sales Song of the Year	"Ella Baila Sola" (with Eslabon Armado)	Nominated	
Billboard Latin Music Awards	2023	Streaming Song of the Year	"Ella Baila Sola" (with Eslabon Armado)	Won	
Billboard Latin Music Awards	2023	Regional Mexican Song of the Year	"Ella Baila Sola" (with Eslabon Armado)	Won	
Billboard Latin Music Awards	2023	Global 200 Latin Song of the Year	"La Bebé (Remix)" (with Yng Lvcas)	Nominated	
Billboard Latin Music Awards	2023	Hot Latin Song of the Year	"La Bebé (Remix)" (with Yng Lvcas)	Nominated	
Billboard Latin Music Awards	2023	Hot Latin Song of the Year, Vocal Event	"La Bebé (Remix)" (with Yng Lvcas)	Nominated	
Billboard Latin Music Awards	2023	Streaming Song of the Year	"La Bebé (Remix)" (with Yng Lvcas)	Nominated	
Billboard Latin Music Awards	2023	Latin Rhythm Airplay Song of the Year	"La Bebé (Remix)" (with Yng Lvcas)	Nominated	
Billboard Latin Music Awards	2023	Streaming Song of the Year	"PRC" (with Natanael Cano)	Nominated	
Billboard Latin Music Awards	2023	Regional Mexican Song of the Year	"PRC" (with Natanael Cano)	Nominated	
Billboard Latin Music Awards	2023	Top Latin Album of the Year	Génesis	Nominated	
Billboard Latin Music Awards	2023	Regional Mexican Album of the Year	Génesis	Nominated	
Billboard Latin Music Awards	2024	Artist of the Year	Peso Pluma	Nominated	
Billboard Latin Music Awards	2024	Global 200 Latin Artist of the Year	Peso Pluma	Nominated	
Billboard Latin Music Awards	2024	Hot Latin Songs Artist of the Year, Male	Peso Pluma	Won	
Billboard Latin Music Awards	2024	Top Latin Albums Artist of the Year, Male	Peso Pluma	Nominated	
Billboard Latin Music Awards	2024	Regional Mexican Artist of the Year, Male	Peso Pluma	Won	
Billboard Latin Music Awards	2024	Songwriter of the Year	Peso Pluma	Won	
Billboard Latin Music Awards	2024	Global 200 Latin Song of the Year	"Qlona" (with Karol G)	Nominated	
Billboard Latin Music Awards	2024	Hot Latin Song of the Year	"Qlona" (with Karol G)	Won	
Billboard Latin Music Awards	2024	Hot Latin Song of the Year, Vocal Event	"Qlona" (with Karol G)	Won	
Billboard Latin Music Awards	2024	Latin Airplay Song of the Year	"Qlona" (with Karol G)	Nominated	
Billboard Latin Music Awards	2024	Sales Song of the Year	"Qlona" (with Karol G)	Nominated	
Billboard Latin Music Awards	2024	Streaming Song of the Year	"Qlona" (with Karol G)	Won	
Billboard Latin Music Awards	2024	Streaming Song of the Year	"Lady Gaga" (with Gabito Ballesteros and Junior H)	Nominated	
Billboard Latin Music Awards	2024	Hot Latin Song of the Year, Vocal Event	"Lady Gaga" (with Gabito Ballesteros and Junior H)	Nominated	
Billboard Latin Music Awards	2024	Regional Mexican Album of the Year	Éxodo	Nominated	
Billboard Latin Music Awards	2025	Artist of the Year	Peso Pluma	Nominated	
Billboard Latin Music Awards	2025	Hot Latin Songs Artist of the Year, Male	Peso Pluma	Nominated	
Billboard Latin Music Awards	2025	Top Latin Albums Artist of the Year, Male	Peso Pluma	Nominated	
Billboard Latin Music Awards	2025	Regional Mexican Artist of the Year, Solo	Peso Pluma	Won	
Billboard Latin Music Awards	2025	Hot Latin Song of the Year, Vocal Event:	"Dos Días" (with Tito Double P)	Nominated	
Billboard Latin Music Awards	2025	Regional Mexican Song of the Year	"Dos Días" (with Tito Double P)	Nominated	
Billboard Latin Music Awards	2025	Regional Mexican Song of the Year	"La Patrulla" (with Netón Vega)	Nominated	
Billboard Latin Music Awards	2025	Top Latin Album of the Year	Éxodo	Nominated	
Billboard Latin Music Awards	2025	Top Regional Mexican Album of the Year	Éxodo	Nominated	
Billboard Latin Music Awards	2026	Artist of the Year	Peso Pluma	Nominated	
Billboard Latin Music Awards	2026	Hot Latin Songs Artist of the Year, Male	Peso Pluma	Nominated	
Billboard Latin Music Awards	2026	Top Latin Albums Artist of the Year, Male	Peso Pluma	Nominated	
Billboard Latin Music Awards	2026	Regional Mexican Artist of the Year, Solo	Peso Pluma	Won	
Billboard Latin Music Awards	2026	Songwriter of the Year	Peso Pluma	Nominated	
Billboard Latin Music Awards	2026	Producer of the Year	Peso Pluma	Nominated	
Billboard Latin Music Awards	2026	Top Latin Album of the Year	Dinastía	Won	
Billboard Latin Music Awards	2026	Top Regional Mexican Album of the Year	Dinastía	Won	
Billboard Latin Music Awards	2026	Global 200 Latin Song of the Year	"Daño" (with Tito Double P)	Nominated	
Billboard Latin Music Awards	2026	Hot Latin Song of the Year	"Daño" (with Tito Double P)	Nominated	
Billboard Latin Music Awards	2026	Hot Latin Song of the Year, Vocal Event	"Daño" (with Tito Double P)	Won	
Billboard Latin Music Awards	2026	Streaming Song of the Year	"Daño" (with Tito Double P)	Nominated	
Billboard Latin Music Awards	2026	Regional Mexican Song of the Year	"Daño" (with Tito Double P)	Nominated	
Billboard Latin Music Awards	2026	Hot Latin Song of the Year	"Dopamina" (with Tito Double P)	Nominated	
Billboard Latin Music Awards	2026	Hot Latin Song of the Year, Vocal Event	"Dopamina" (with Tito Double P)	Nominated	
Billboard Latin Music Awards	2026	Hot Latin Song of the Year, Vocal Event	"7-3" (with Tito Double P)	Nominated	
Billboard Latin Music Awards	2026	Hot Latin Song of the Year, Vocal Event	"Chiclona" (with Tito Double P & Lencho)	Nominated	
Billboard Music Awards	2023	Top New Artist	Peso Pluma	Nominated	
Billboard Music Awards	2023	Top Latin Artist	Peso Pluma	Nominated	
Billboard Music Awards	2023	Top Latin Male Artist	Peso Pluma	Nominated	
Billboard Music Awards	2023	Top Latin Album	Génesis	Nominated	
Billboard Music Awards	2023	Top Latin Song	"Ella Baila Sola" (with Eslabon Armado)	Won	
Billboard Music Awards	2023	Top Latin Song	"La Bebé (Remix)" (with Yng Lvcas)	Nominated	
Billboard Music Awards	2024	Top Latin Song	"Qlona" (with Karol G)	Nominated	
Billboard Music Awards	2024	Top Latin Artist	Peso Pluma	Nominated	
Billboard Music Awards	2024	Top Latin Male Artist	Peso Pluma	Nominated	
Grammy Awards	2024	Best Música Mexicana Album (including Tejano)	Génesis	Won	
Grammy Awards	2025	Best Música Mexicana Album (including Tejano)	Éxodo	Nominated	
Latin American Music Awards	2024	Artist of the Year	Peso Pluma	Nominated	
Latin American Music Awards	2024	New Artist of the Year	Peso Pluma	Nominated	
Latin American Music Awards	2024	Streaming Artist of the Year	Peso Pluma	Nominated	
Latin American Music Awards	2024	Global Latin Artist of the Year	Peso Pluma	Nominated	
Latin American Music Awards	2024	Favorite Regional Mexican Artist	Peso Pluma	Nominated	
Latin American Music Awards	2024	Song of the Year	"Ella Baila Sola" (with Eslabon Armado)	Nominated	
Latin American Music Awards	2024	Global Latin Song of the Year	"Ella Baila Sola" (with Eslabon Armado)	Nominated	
Latin American Music Awards	2024	Best Collaboration - Regional Mexican	"Ella Baila Sola" (with Eslabon Armado)	Won	
Latin American Music Awards	2024	Collaboration of the Year	"La Bebe (Remix)" (with Yng Lvcas)	Nominated	
Latin American Music Awards	2024	Album of the Year	Génesis	Nominated	
Latin American Music Awards	2024	Favorite Regional Mexican Album	Génesis	Won	
Latin American Music Awards	2024	Tour of the Year	Doble P Tour 2023	Nominated	
Latin Grammy Awards	2023	Song of the Year	"Ella Baila Sola" (with Eslabon Armado)	Nominated	
Latin Grammy Awards	2023	Best Regional Mexican Song	"Ella Baila Sola" (with Eslabon Armado)	Nominated	
Latin Grammy Awards	2024	Record of the Year	"Igual Que un Ángel" (with Kali Uchis)	Nominated	
Latin Grammy Awards	2024	Best Pop Song	"Igual Que un Ángel" (with Kali Uchis)	Nominated	
Latin Grammy Awards	2024	Best Reggaeton Performance	"Qlona" (with Karol G)	Nominated	
Latin Grammy Awards	2024	Best Urban Song	"Qlona" (with Karol G)	Nominated	
Latin Grammy Awards	2024	Best Contemporary Mexican Music Album	Génesis	Nominated	
Latin Grammy Awards	2026	Best Contemporary Mexican Music Album	Dinastía	Nominated	
Latino Music Awards	2023	Mejor artista regional mexicano masculino	Peso Pluma	Won	
Latino Music Awards	2023	Artista revelación del año	Peso Pluma	Won	
Latino Music Awards	2023	Mejor canción regional mexicano	Ella Baila Sola (with Eslabon Armado)	Won	
Latino Music Awards	2023	Videoclip del año	Ella Baila Sola (with Eslabon Armado)	Won	
MTV Europe Music Awards	2023	Best New	Peso Pluma	Won	
MTV Europe Music Awards	2023	Best Latin	Peso Pluma	Nominated	
MTV Europe Music Awards	2024	Best Latin	Peso Pluma	Won	
MTV Europe Music Awards	2024	Best Collaboration	"Bellakeo" (with Anitta)	Nominated	
MTV Millennial Awards	2023	MIAW Artist	Peso Pluma	Nominated	
MTV Millennial Awards	2023	Mexican Artist	Peso Pluma	Nominated	
MTV Millennial Awards	2023	Artist to Watch	Peso Pluma	Won	
MTV Millennial Awards	2023	Best Style	Peso Pluma	Nominated	
MTV Millennial Awards	2023	Reggaeton Hit	"La Bebé" (Remix) (with Yng Lvcas)	Won	
MTV Millennial Awards	2023	Viral Anthem	"La Bebé" (Remix) (with Yng Lvcas)	Nominated	
MTV Millennial Awards	2023	Viral Anthem	"Ella Baila Sola" (with Eslabon Armado)	Nominated	
MTV Millennial Awards	2023	Global Hit of the Year	"Ella Baila Sola" (with Eslabon Armado)	Nominated	
MTV Millennial Awards	2023	Music Ship of the Year	"Chanel" (with Becky G)	Nominated	
MTV Millennial Awards	2024	MIAW Artist	Peso Pluma	Nominated	
MTV Millennial Awards	2024	Regional Artist	Peso Pluma	Nominated	
MTV Millennial Awards	2024	Bellakeo Supremo	"Bellakeo" (with Anitta)	Nominated	
MTV Millennial Awards	2024	Bellakeo Supremo	"Qlona" (with Karol G)	Nominated	
MTV Millennial Awards	2024	Collaboration of the Year	"Igual que un Ángel" (with Kali Uchis)	Nominated	
MTV Millennial Awards	2024	Epic Kiss	Anitta & Peso Pluma	Won	
MTV Video Music Awards	2023	Best New Artist	Peso Pluma	Nominated	
MTV Video Music Awards	2023	Best Latin	"Ella Baila Sola" (with Eslabon Armado)	Nominated	
MTV Video Music Awards	2023	Song of Summer	"La Bebé" (Remix) (with Yng Lvcas)	Nominated	
MTV Video Music Awards	2024	Best Latin	"Bellakeo" (with Anitta)	Nominated	
MTV Video Music Awards	2025	Best Latin	"La Patrulla" (with Netón Vega)	Nominated	
Premios Lo Nuestro	2024	Artist of the Year	Peso Pluma	Nominated	
Premios Lo Nuestro	2024	New Artist – Male	Peso Pluma	Won	
Premios Lo Nuestro	2024	Male Regional Mexican Artist of the Year	Peso Pluma	Nominated	
Premios Lo Nuestro	2024	Song of the Year	"Ella Baila Sola" (with Eslabon Armado)	Nominated	
Premios Lo Nuestro	2024	Regional Mexican Song of the Year	"Ella Baila Sola" (with Eslabon Armado)	Won	
Premios Lo Nuestro	2024	Regional Mexican Collaboration of the Year	"Ella Baila Sola" (with Eslabon Armado)	Nominated	
Premios Lo Nuestro	2024	Regional Mexican Fusion Song of the Year	"Ella Baila Sola" (with Eslabon Armado)	Won	
Premios Lo Nuestro	2024	The Perfect Mix of the Year	"Chanel" (with Becky G)	Nominated	
Premios Lo Nuestro	2024	The Perfect Mix of the Year	"Peso Pluma: Bzrp Music Sessions, Vol. 55" (with Bizarrap)	Nominated	
Premios Lo Nuestro	2024	Remix of the Year	"La Bebe (Remix)" (with Yng Lvcas)	Nominated	
Premios Lo Nuestro	2024	Urban Collaboration of the Year	"La Bebe (Remix)" (with Yng Lvcas)	Nominated	
Premios Lo Nuestro	2024	Album of the Year	Génesis	Nominated	
Premios Lo Nuestro	2024	Regional Mexican Album of the Year	Génesis	Won	
Premios Lo Nuestro	2025	Artist of the Year	Peso Pluma	Nominated	
Premios Lo Nuestro	2025	Mexican Music - Male Artist Of The Year	Peso Pluma	Nominated	
Premios Lo Nuestro	2025	Urban Song of the Year	"Bellakeo" (with Anitta)	Won	
Premios Lo Nuestro	2025	Pop-Urban Song Of The Year	"Tommy & Pamela" (with Kenia Os)	Won	
Premios Lo Nuestro	2025	Mexican Music - Collaboration Of The Year	"Dos Días" (with Tito Double P)	Nominated	
Premios Lo Nuestro	2025	Mexican Music - Song Of The Year	""La Intención" (with Christian Nodal)	Nominated	
Premios Lo Nuestro	2025	Mexican Music - Best Electro Corrido	"Teka" (with DJ Snake)	Nominated	
Premios Lo Nuestro	2026	Mexican Music – Collaboration of the Year	"Morena" (with Netón Vega)	Nominated	
Premios Juventud	2023	Artist of the Youth – Male	Peso Pluma	Won	
Premios Juventud	2023	My Favorite Streaming Artist	Peso Pluma	Nominated	
Premios Juventud	2023	New Generation – Regional Mexican	Peso Pluma	Won	
Premios Juventud	2023	I Want More	Peso Pluma	Nominated	
Premios Juventud	2023	Best Urban Track	"La Bebe" (Remix) (with Yng Lvcas)	Nominated	
Premios Juventud	2023	Best Regional Mexican Song	"Ella Baila Sola" (with Eslabon Armado)	Won	
Premios Juventud	2023	Best Regional Mexican Collaboration	"PRC" (with Natanael Cano)	Won	
Premios Juventud	2023	Best Regional Mexican Fusion	"Chanel" (with Becky G)	Nominated	
Premios Juventud	2023	Best Regional Mexican Album	Sembrando	Won	
Premios Juventud	2024	Artist of the Youth – Male	Peso Pluma	Won	
Premios Juventud	2024	The Perfect Mix	"Bellakeo" (with Anitta)	Won	
Premios Juventud	2024	Best Urban Track	"Qlona" (with Karol G)	Won	
Premios Juventud	2024	Best Urban Mix	"Quema" (with Ryan Castro & SOG)	Won	
Premios Juventud	2024	Best Regional Mexican Collaboration	"Lady Gaga" (with Gabito Ballesteros & Junior H)	Won	
Premios Juventud	2024	Best Regional Mexican Fusion	"Peso Pluma: Bzrp Music Sessions, Vol. 55" (with Bizarrap)	Nominated	
Premios Juventud	2024	Best Regional Mexican Album	Génesis	Won	
Premios Juventud	2025	Best Urban Track	"Tommy & Pamela" (with Kenia OS)	Nominated	
Premios Juventud	2025	Best Dance Track	"Teka" (with DJ Snake)	Nominated	
Premios Juventud	2025	Best Urban Mix	"Teka" (with DJ Snake)	Nominated	
Premios Juventud	2025	Best Mexican Music Fusion	"Dos Días" (with Tito Double P )	Nominated	
Premios Juventud	2025	Best Regional Mexican Album	Éxodo	Nominated	
Premios Juventud	2026	Best Urban Track	"Apaga La Luz" (with Røz )	Nominated	
Premios Juventud	2026	Best Tour	Dinastía Tour	Nominated	
Premios Juventud	2026	Best Mexican Music Album	Dinastía (with Peso Pluma)	Nominated	
Premios Juventud	2026	Best Mexican Music Fusion	"Dopamina" (with Tito Double P)	Nominated	
Premios Tu Música Urbano	2023	Top Artist — Regional Mexican Urban	Peso Pluma	Nominated	
Premios Tu Música Urbano	2023	Remix of the Year	"La Bebé" (Remix) (with Yng Lvcas)	Won	
Rolling Stone en Español Awards	2023	Promising Artist of the Year	Peso Pluma	Nominated	

== Other accolades ==
=== World records ===
Name of publication, year the record was awarded, name of the record, and the name of the record holder
Publication	Year	World record	Ref.
Guinness World Records	2024	Most-viewed Latin artist on YouTube in 2023	

== See also ==
- List of Mexican Grammy Award winners and nominees

== Notes ==
- Note: At the 24th Annual Latin Grammy Awards, "Ella Baila Sola" was nominated for Song of the Year and Best Regional Mexican Song. The nominations went to Pedro Julian Tovar Oceguera as songwriter.
