= La Durango =

Single by Peso Pluma, Junior H and Eslabón Armado

from the album Éxodo
- Language: Spanish
- Released: 9 May 2024
- Genre: Regional Mexican
- Length: 4:22
- Label: Double P
- Songwriters: Abraham Reyes Pérez; Daniel Hernández Rangel
- Producers: Ernesto Fernández; Jesús Iván Leal Reyes; Peso Pluma

Peso Pluma singles chronology
"Teka" (2024)	"La Durango" (2024)	"Sin Yolanda" (2024)

Junior H singles chronology
"A Tu Manera" (2024)	"La Durango" (2024)

Eslabón Armado singles chronology
"Amarte a la Antigua" (2024)	"La Durango" (2024)

Lyric video
- "La Durango" on YouTube

"La Durango" is a song by Mexican singers Peso Pluma and Junior H and American regional Mexican band Eslabón Armado. It was released on 9 May 2024 through Double P Records, as the sixth single from Pluma's fourth studio album Éxodo (2024). It is Pluma's seventh collaboration with Junior H and his second collaboration with Eslabón Armado after their successful single "Ella Baila Sola".

== Background ==
After the former released "Peso Completo" with Arcángel, he posted a snippet of another single he would release through Instagram, along with Junior H and Pedro Tovar of Eslabon Armado. He eventually announced the release date for Éxodo on 8 May 2024, through its accompanying teaser which features Irish professional mixed martial artist Conor McGregor. He also announced a single titled "La Durango" which would be released the next day.

== Live performances ==
Pluma performed "La Durango" on The Tonight Show Starring Jimmy Fallon along with Tovar on May 16, 2024.

== Charts ==
Chart performance for "La Durango"
Chart (2024)	Peak position
Global 200 (Billboard)	83
Mexico (Billboard)	5
US Billboard Hot 100	75
US Hot Latin Songs (Billboard)	2
