= La Cuadrada =

2025 song by Belinda and Tito Double P

Single by Belinda and Tito Double P

from the album Indómita
- Released: 16 January 2025
- Genre: Corridos tumbados
- Length: 2:40
- Label: Warner Music México
- Songwriters: Belinda Peregrín; Jesús Roberto Laija García; José Ángel Pérez Sandoval
- Producers: José Ángel Pérez Sandoval; Marcelo Rivera Levy; Tito Double P

Belinda singles chronology
"Jackpot" (2024)	"La Cuadrada" (2025)	"Blink Twice (Dos Veces Remix)" (2025)

Tito Double P singles chronology
"Rosones" (2024)	"La Cuadrada" (2025)	"7 Días" (2025)

Music video
- "La Cuadrada" on YouTube

"La Cuadrada" (lit. 'the square') is a song recorded by Mexican singers Belinda and Tito Double P. The track was released by Warner Music México on January 16, 2025, as the fifth single from Belinda's fifth studio album, Indómita (2025).

== Background and composition ==
At the end of 2024, the news of Belinda's collaboration with Tito Double P was confirmed, and since then, both artists have been sharing clues on their social media about what the official video would sound like, what it would say, and what it would look like.

The song features a casual, flirtatious tone between the individuals, with references to luxury cars, tequila, and parties, while maintaining the narrative of a dangerous relationship. The composition reinforces the connection between Belinda and Tito Double P's styles, achieving a balance between them.

== Music video ==
The video was directed by La Flakka. A music video and a short film of almost eight minutes were made to tell the story of a pair of high-class hitmen who are given the mission of killing each other by a strange Italian client. The short film, recorded in Puebla, begins with Belinda enjoying a relaxing moment in the sun when Damiano calls her to inform her about his next target. At the same time, Tito receives the same assignment, but with his girlfriend's information in the instructions. Then, a battle begins with multiple failed murder attempts, but full of glamour and luxury. The images are recorded with both color and black and white shots, which change speed, tone and atmosphere depending on the situation in which the characters find themselves, in addition the hyperbolic performances give a comic touch to the situation.

== Charts ==
Chart performance for "La Cuadrada"
Chart (2025)	Peak position
Latin Airplay (Billboard)	33
Regional Mexican Airplay (Billboard)	15
Mexico (Monitor Latino)	1

== Certifications ==
Certifications and sales for "La Cuadrada"
Region	Certification	Certified units/sales
Mexico (AMPROFON)	Gold	70,000^{‡}
^{‡} Sales+streaming figures based on certification alone.

== Awards and nominations ==
Year	Ceremony	Category	Result	Ref.
World Film Festival in Cannes	2025	Best Music Video	Won	
New York International Film Awards	2025	Best Music Video	Won	
Los Angeles Film Awards	2025	Best Music Video	Won	
LAMV Music Video Awards	2025	Best Art Director	Pending	
LAMV Music Video Awards	2025	Best Cinematographer	Pending	
LAMV Music Video Awards	2025	Best Music Video	Pending	
Beyond the Short Film Festival	2025	Music Video Winner	Won	
Berlin Indie Film Festival	2025	Best Thriller	Won	
