= La People II =

Single by Peso Pluma, Tito Double P and Joel de la P

from the album Éxodo
- Language: Spanish
- Released: 21 March 2024
- Genre: corridos tumbados
- Length: 2:21
- Label: Double P
- Songwriters: Jesús Roberto Laija Garcia; Joel Portillo
- Producers: Ernesto Fernández; Jassiel Ramos; Joel de la P; Peso Pluma; Tito Double P

Peso Pluma singles chronology
| "No Son Klle" (2024) | "La People II" (2024) | "Humo" (2024) |

Tito Double P singles chronology
| "La Bestia" (2024) | "La People II" (2024) | "Deltas" (2024) |

Joel de la P singles chronology
| "El Comando" (2024) | "La People II" (2024) | "La Pelota" (2024) |

Music video
- "La People II" on YouTube

"La People II" is a song by Mexican singer-songwriter and rapper Peso Pluma, fellow singer-songwriter and rapper Tito Double P, and singer Joel de la P. It was released on 21 March 2024, through Double P Records, as the third single from the Pluma's fourth studio album Éxodo (2024) and is a sequel to Pluma and Tito Double P's collaboration "La People", from the album Génesis (2023). It was written by Tito Double P and Joel de la P, while its production was done by all three singers, along with Ernesto Fernández and Jassiel Ramos.

== Background and lyrics ==
Peso Pluma posted a random date, 21 March 2024, on his X (formerly Twitter) account, speculating that his fourth album Éxodo would be released. "La People II" would instead be released, a song that again mentions El Nini, known alias of Néstor Isidro Pérez Salas.

== Commercial performance ==
"La People II" debuted at number 69 on the Billboard Hot 100 with 9.1 million official streams in the United States, making it the latter two artists' first entry on the chart. It also peaked at number two on the US Hot Latin Songs and Latin Streaming Songs charts.

== Charts ==
Chart performance for "La People II"
| Chart (2023) | Peak position |
|---|---|
| Global 200 (Billboard) | 61 |
| Mexico (Billboard) | 4 |
| US Billboard Hot 100 | 69 |
| US Hot Latin Songs (Billboard) | 2 |

== Certifications ==
Certifications for "La People II"
| Region | Certification | Certified units/sales |
|---|---|---|
| United States (RIAA) | 18× Platinum (Latin) | 1,080,000^{‡} |
^{‡} Sales+streaming figures based on certification alone.
