= Éxodo =

2024 studio album by Peso Pluma

Studio album by Peso Pluma
- Released: 20 June 2024
- Recorded: 2023–2024
- Studios: Prajin Parlay Studioz (Anaheim, California); Lab Studios (Coconut Grove, Miami)
- Genres: Corridos tumbados; Latin trap; reggaeton
- Length: 77:56
- Languages: Spanish; English; French (Note: The album includes a French-language line of words on the track "Santal 33".)
- Label: Double P
- Producers: Andrew Watt; Charlie Handsome; Chris Jedi; Cirkut; Dímelo Flow; DJ Durel; DJ Maff; DJ Snake; Edgar Barrera; El Chachito; Ernesto Fernández; Frank Rio; Fresh; Gaby Music; Jassiel Ramos; Jesus Iván Leal Reyes; Joel de la P; Jorge Milliano; Junior H; Mario Cáceres; Óscar Carefundillo; Peso Pluma; Rogét Chahayed; SOG; TheLabCook; Tito Double P; Bob Esponja

Peso Pluma chronology
Génesis (2023)	Éxodo (2024)	Dinastía (2025)

Singles from Éxodo
- 1. "Bellakeo" Released: 7 December 2023; 2. "Rompe la Dompe" Released: 28 December 2023; 3. "La People II" Released: 21 March 2024; 4. "Peso Completo" Released: 11 April 2024; 5. "Teka" Released: 17 April 2024; 6. "La Durango" Released: 9 May 2024; 7. "Gimme a Second" Released: 24 May 2024; 8. "Vino Tinto" Released: 26 June 2024; 9. "Tommy & Pamela" Released: 18 July 2024; 10. "La Patrulla" Released: 5 September 2024; 11. "Hollywood" Released: 13 December 2024

Éxodo (transl. Exodus) is the fourth studio album by Mexican singer Peso Pluma. (Note: Peso Pluma has considered Éxodo as his second studio album, acknowledging Génesis (2023) as his debut. Several publications have referred to it as his fourth studio album, including the latter, Ah y Qué? (2020) and Efectos Secundarios (2021) as its predecessors.) It was released on 20 June 2024, through Double P Records. It was mostly produced by the singer alongside Ernesto Fernández and Jesus Iván Leal Reyes "Parka". The album's guest appearances include frequent collaborators such as Junior H, Eslabón Armado, Tito Double P, Luis R. Conriquez, Óscar Maydon, Natanael Cano, Gabito Ballesteros, Arcángel and Ryan Castro, while it also features new collaborators including Netón Vega, Chino Pacas, Iván Cornejo, Rich the Kid, Cardi B, Quavo, Anitta, Kenia Os and DJ Snake.

Serving as a follow-up of his third studio album, Génesis (2023), he began recording the album at major cities in the United States and Mexico, including Prajin Parlay Studioz in Anaheim, California and Lab Studios in Coconut Grove, Miami, with several sessions lasting from 2023 to mid-2024. Further production contributions were from Andrew Watt, Charlie Handsome, Chris Jedi, Cirkut, Dímelo Flow, DJ Durel, Édgar Barrera and Gaby Music, among others. Éxodo is a double album split into two discs; the first disc consists of corridos tumbados songs, while its second disc explores more urban genres such as hip-hop, Latin trap, reggaeton and electronic dance music. Éxodo contains lyrics surrounding luxury, organized crime, stardom and religion.

Peso Pluma embarked his North American second headlining tour, the Éxodo Tour, the first arena tour of his career, in July 2024, to support the album. In addition, he released eleven singles from the album beginning December 2023, including "Bellakeo", "Rompe la Dompe", "La People II", "Peso Completo", "Teka", "La Durango", "Gimme a Second", "Vino Tinto", "Tommy & Pamela", "La Patrulla" and "Hollywood". Upon release, Éxodo received mostly favorable reviews from music critics, who praised the album's production and Peso Pluma's versatility within it, while other publications criticized its lack of consistency and the inclusion of its second disc.

On Spotify, the album garnered 29.8 million global streams within all of its tracks in its first 24 hours, becoming the highest debut for an album by a Mexican artist. It peaked at number one on the US Top Latin Albums and Regional Mexican Albums charts, additionally peaking at number five on the US Billboard 200 with 64,000 additional album-equivalent units, becoming his second top-five album on the chart. It was later certified undecuple-platinum in the Latin field by the Recording Industry Association of America (RIAA). The album was also nominated for the Grammy Award for Best Música Mexicana Album (including Tejano) at the 67th Annual Grammy Awards, becoming Peso Pluma's second nomination in the awards overall.

== Background and recording ==
Peso Pluma rose to global prominence in early 2023, when he released singles such as "PRC" with Natanael Cano, "El Azul" with Junior H, "Ella Baila Sola" with Eslabon Armado, and "La Bebé" with Yng Lvcas, which have appeared on the Billboard Hot 100. Amidst his success, he announced his third studio album, Génesis, in May 2023. Promoted with a trailer featuring Mike Tyson, it was released on 20 June 2024, with a "deluxe" edition being released a week later, adding three additional tracks. A commercial success, it debuted at No. 3 on the Billboard 200 with 73,000 album-equivalent units after its next full tracking week, making history as the highest debut and charting for a regional Mexican album on the chart; all of its tracks were also charting on the US Hot Latin Songs upon debut.

After the album's release and success, Peso Pluma began recording his next studio album, with several album recording sessions taking place throughout 2023 and mid-2024. According to Peso Pluma, the album was recorded in different stages and phases of his life and career. Recording and production for the album took place in cities such as Los Angeles, Miami and New York City, including Mexico. A majority of the album was recorded at Prajin Parlay Studioz in Anaheim, California. In October 2023, the singer revealed to Billboard that he was working on his next album, adding that there would be reggaeton tracks among other genres and that frequent collaborators would appear, along with new collaborators. It was released and distributed through Double P Records, making it Peso Pluma's second album released by Double P following Génesis.

In February 2024, Génesis received the Grammy Award for Best Música Mexicana Album (including Tejano) at the 66th Annual Grammy Awards, becoming the singer's first time accomplishing this. Despite the success, a video of him with another woman in Las Vegas spread around social media, abruptly ending his relationship with Argentinian singer Nicki Nicole, which began in 2023. During a cover story with Rolling Stone, where he also became the first regional Mexican artist to be on the cover of their magazine, he revealed his next album title as Éxodo while regarding the rumors about his breakup with Nicole, to which he did not want to talk about. While being interviewed by Rolling Stone, a recording session for the album took place at Lab Studios in Coconut Grove, Miami, Florida, where American producer Édgar Barrera and fellow songwriter Alexis Fierro (El Chachito) appeared in the process.

== Composition and concept ==
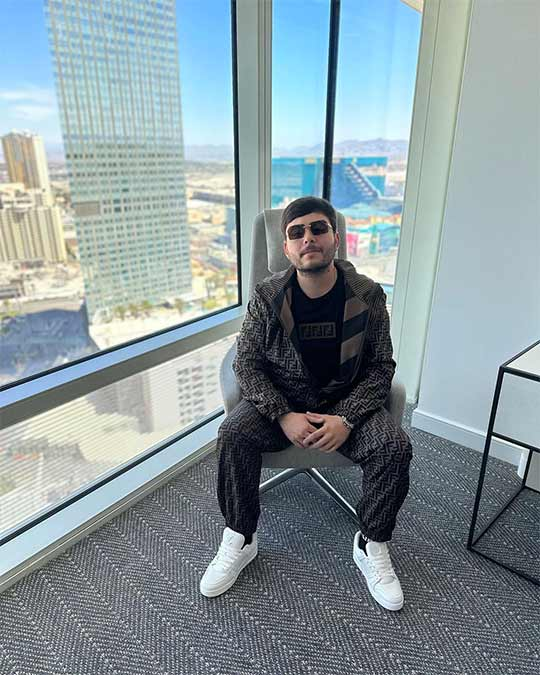
Tito Double P (pictured), fellow singer known as Peso Pluma's cousin, contributed to songwriting and production for the album.

Éxodo was released as a double album; it is composed of 24 tracks in total, with 16 tracks on disc 1 and eight tracks on disc 2. Its first disc has been characterized as material with regional Mexican influences and corridos tumbados compositions. Its second disc contains a variety of musical genres, mostly urban genres, including electronic, hip-hop, Latin trap and reggaeton tracks. Peso Pluma initially confirmed that there would be experimentation within the album, aside from his main genre of regional Mexican music, stating he wanted it to be a "surprise" for everyone and that he has "liked doing things to get out of [his] comfort zone". He also chose to create such an album because "some of [his] fans were craving música Mexicana, and some were craving urbano", doing so while continuing to use his original musical style. Throughout the album, themes found within its songs' lyrics include stardom, women, luxury, religion, stress relief and organized crime.

The first disc of Éxodo would be co-produced by Peso Pluma, as well as fellow producers Ernesto Fernández and Jesus Iván Leal Reyes, who helped produce his third studio album, Génesis (2023). Within the disc, Peso Pluma's touring band contributed with the instruments, while artists from his label, Double P Records, including his cousin Tito "Double P" Laija, contributed to most of its production and songwriting. Instruments used within the album's first disc include the tenor horn, the requinto guitar, the tololoche and the electric bass. For "Solicitado", an electric bass is used instead of a tololoche. Barrera contributed to four tracks off the album; he co-wrote and co-produced "Santal 33" and "14 - 14", while he co-wrote "Vino Tinto" and "Tommy & Pamela". "Put Em in the Fridge" was first sent to Peso Pluma by one of Cardi B's producers, with production credits going to Charlie Handsome and Fresh.

Regarding the album's title, Peso Pluma explained that his third album, Génesis, showed his "superhero side", while Éxodo shows "his dark side" and is a direct response to critics who "focus more on the negatives than the positives", likely referring to his music. Translated to "Exodus" in English, the album follows his third studio album, Génesis (2023), creating a biblical reference to the Bible's second book Exodus following that of Genesis. He explained to Spin that Génesis marked "the beginning" and that Éxodo is a continuation of it, adding that Éxodo marks a new era for him. Its album artwork was revealed on 24 May 2024, which shows a "distorted inverted-color" image of Peso Pluma holding the V sign with both hands. In an interview with Publimetro México, he explained that he wanted the album cover to be different from what he had seen before, while stating that it is "a representation of these changes that [Éxodo] and [himself] have gone through in recent years".

== Songs ==
"La Durango", the opener for Éxodo, features Peso Pluma, Junior H and Eslabón Armado singing about how beautiful women are in a Dodge Durango, which alludes to the title, and also makes a reference to the tequila Don Julio 70. The album's second track "Me Activo" (transl. "I Activate Myself") with Jasiel Nuñez, features Peso Pluma "shift[ing] his voice into a serenade-like tone", while containing "catchy, high-stakes" guitar tones in the background, with its following track "La Patrulla" (transl. "The Patrol") with Netón Vega being a narcocorrido. The fourth track, "La People II" with Tito Double P and Joel de la P, is a sequel to the former's track with the first mentioned singer "La People" and contains lyrical elements to that of a narcocorrido. Lyrically, it is an apology for organized crime and contains references to El Nini, El 27, and El Piyi, who all have connections to the Sinaloa Cartel. On "Sr. Smith", Peso Pluma and Luis R. Conriquez sing about hustling for a lush lifestyle, while "Rompe la Dompe" (transl. "Break the Dompe"), the album's sixth track with Junior H and Óscar Maydon, contains lyrics which revolve around having a party, forgetting about a lover, and opening a bottle of Champagne, specifically the Dom Pérignon brand.

"Mami" is a "catchy" track in which Peso Pluma and Chino Pacas show confidence and romantic interest for a certain woman. In the album's eighth track, "Belanova" with Tito Double P, features lyrics which revolve around promising to die fighting; its title makes a reference to the Mexican pop band of the same name and is described as a possible "follow-up" to the former's song "Rosa Pastel", which may inspired to the Mexican pop band's song of the same name. "Bruce Wayne" commences with a "left-field" piano melody, with Peso Pluma thematically playing the role of a dark character in the track and visualizing himself as a billionaire with "gravelly self-assurance", while casually switching his vocal approach; he includes a rap approach within its second verse. A cover, "Hollywood" with Estevan Plazola, is an ode to Hollywood, Los Angeles, with its lyrics revolving around being abused as a child and gaining eventual fame. The track also contains lyrics which are possibly directed at Mexican former president Andrés Manuel López Obrador, according to some publications. "Reloj" (transl. "Clock" or "Wristwatch") with Iván Cornejo is a sad sierreño song which features psychedelic sounds while both singers "take turns harmonizing one another to mesmerizing effect"

"Ice", is a corrido bélico which begins with a sample spoken by American wrestler Ric Flair, demonstrating the similar connections of corridos and gangsta rap. "Solicitado" (transl. "Requested") lyrically sees Peso Pluma reflecting on fame and its negative outcomes, as well as changes in life, while "Santal 33" with Óscar Maydon, in which its title is a reference to the cologne of the same name, features lyrics about high life. The song also features a few lyrics in French. "Vino Tinto" (transl. "Red Wine"), the 15th track and third collaboration between Natanael Cano and Gabito Ballesteros, begins with a EDM-like synthesizer used to transition into a corrido tumbado, Concluding the album's first disc, "14 - 14" aesthetically revolves around religion; the track title is an angel number, referencing Exodus 14:14, and the lyrics revolve around him hiding a crucifix around his neck. It contains a sample of Giorgio Moroder's composition "The World Is Yours" at the end of the track, described as "suspensful, organ-like keys" with an "echoing sound of gunfire".

Serving as the opener to the second disc of Éxodo, "Gimme a Second" with Rich the Kid is a trap song which features lyrics revolving around a rags to riches theme, while "Put Em in the Fridge" is a Spanglish corrido-trap song, featuring incorporations of hip-hop beats, where both Peso Pluma and Cardi B rap about transporting cocaine. "Pa No Pensar" (transl. "To Not Think") with Quavo is an emo-trap corrido which revolves around smoking to escape reality, while "Peso Completo" (transl. "Heavyweight") with Arcángel, features a mention of the neighborhood of Condado, Santurce. The musical theme of "Bellakeo" with Anitta revolves around being flirtatious, including a reference to reggaeton duo Plan B. "Mala" (transl. "Bad"), which features a guest appearance from Ryan Castro, is a reggaeton song with a "hypnotizing [and] hip-swiveling" drum beat. "Tommy & Pamela" with Kenia Os is a reggaeton song, whose title is a reference to American musician Tommy Lee and Canadian-American actress Pamela Anderson, where its lyrics are about "recreating" the mentioned partners' sex tape. The album's closing track, "Teka" with DJ Snake features Peso Pluma rapping about dancing in a discoteca (discothèque), interpolating lyrics from Farruko's 2011 single "Pa' Romper la Discoteca".

== Promotion and release ==
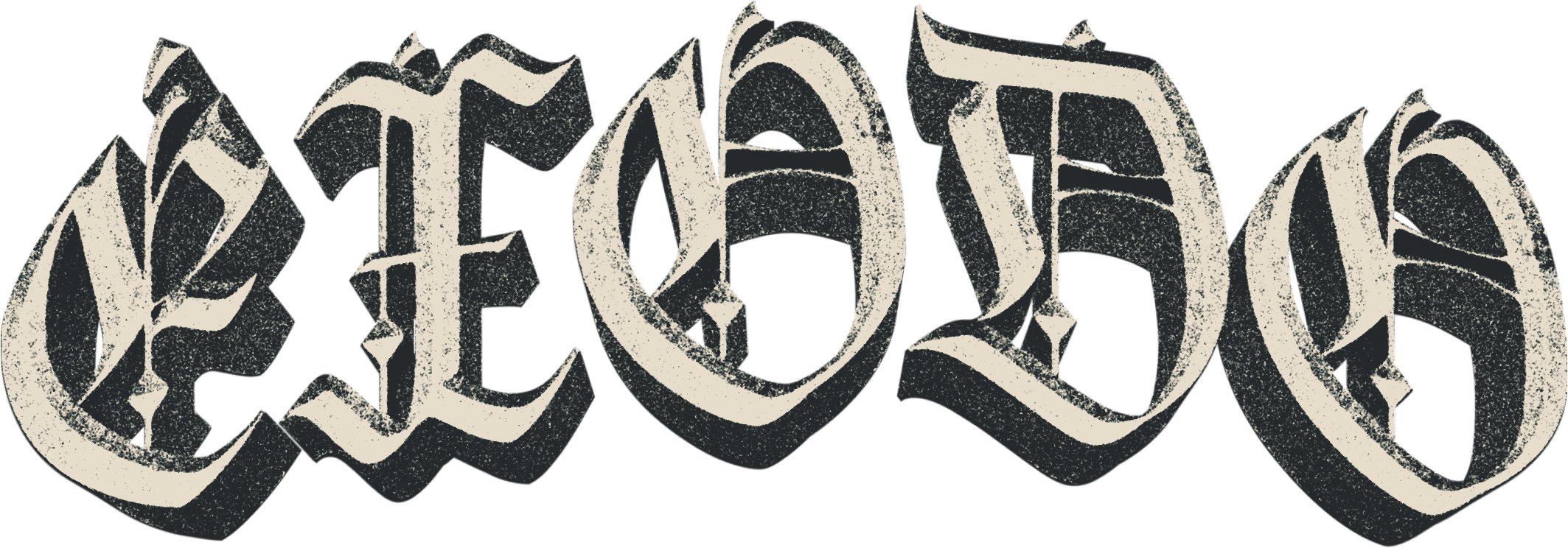
The logo used to promote the album.

On 8 March 2024, Éxodo was first teased when Peso Pluma made a post on Twitter, which showed a specific date, 21 March 2024, along with the text "solo mi deber ejecute...", which marked speculation that it would be released on the exact date. The text is a lyric from the song "La People II", which would instead be released on the posted date as one of the album's singles. In April of the same year, he collaborated with Sony to promote the ULT Power Sound, where its accompanying advertisement contains elements from "Peso Completo", one of the singles from the album. That same month, the album's first planned release date was confirmed by Peso Pluma at the 2024 iHeartRadio Music Awards, where he won the awards for Regional Mexican Song (for "Ella Baila Sola" with Eslabon Armado) and Regional Mexican Artist of the Year, set for release in May 2024, which was not fulfilled. Pluma, who is managed by George Prajin, would later sign a global distribution deal with Creative Artists Agency where he planned on distributing the album from.

In early May of the same year, to further tease Éxodo, fellow collaborators Eslabón Armado and Junior H, along with Peso Pluma, shared an image of a cropped car on their respective Instagram stories with a snippet of an untitled song playing, possibly leading to a collaboration with all three artists. It led to the release of the single "La Durango", as part of the album. He would then announce the official release date for Éxodo on 8 May 2024, though a teaser featuring Irish professional mixed martial artist Conor McGregor. Éxodo was first available for pre-save on Spotify on 24 May 2024. Its track list would also be revealed on the same day, later revealing on Instagram that he cut his signature mullet haircut off, on a story which showed excess hair on the floor, which was also suspected to be his "new look" for the album. An image of him with his new hairstyle, which appears to be a taper fade or side-part, surfaced around social media, which was later confirmed to have been created with artificial intelligence. The album was released for digital download and streaming on 20 June 2024, through Double P Records, Peso Pluma's label.

Aside from the album's accompanying concert tour, Peso Pluma performed "Bellakeo" and "Peso Completo" at Coachella 2024. He and Arcángel performed the latter at the 2024 Latin American Music Awards on 25 August 2024. The singer and Pedro Tovar of Eslabon Armado performed "La Durango" on The Tonight Show Starring Jimmy Fallon, on 16 May 2024. Two days before the release of the album, Peso Pluma announced that he would host two free-access listening parties for the album in Mexico City, titled The Éxodo Experience, in partnership with social networking app StoyCo. On 10 November 2024, he performed "Hollywood" with Plazola at the 2024 MTV Europe Music Awards, where he also accepted the award for Best Latin.

=== Singles ===
"Bellakeo" was released on 7 December 2023, along with its accompanying Madrid-filmed music video, serving as the lead single from Éxodo. Directed by Willy Rodríguez, its video features multiple dancers in black clothing who also appear performing a ritual on a man. In the United States, it peaked No. 53 on the Billboard Hot 100, No. 3 on Hot Latin Songs and No. 8 on Latin Rhythm Airplay. The song reached the summit of the charts in Bolivia and Nicaragua, while it peaked within the top 10 in Ecuador (5), Mexico (6), Paraguay (2), and Peru (2), additionally peaking at No. 7 on the Billboard Global 200. It also received certifications in Brazil, Portugal and Spain. Three weeks later, on 28 December 2024, he would release "Rompe la Dompe" as the album's second single. The song peaked at No. 4 in Mexico, No. 80 on the US Billboard Hot 100, No. 12 on US Hot Latin Songs, and number 51 on the Billboard Global 200.

"La People II" was released on 21 March 2024 as the album's third single. Its music video was also released simultaneously, which was filmed in Coyoacán, Mexico and was directed by Fernando Lugo, and it peaked at No. 69 and No. 2 on US Billboard Hot 100 and US Hot Latin Songs charts, respectively. It would also reached peak positions of No. 4 in Mexico and No. 61 on the Billboard Global 200. "Peso Completo" was released on 11 April 2024, as the fourth single from Éxodo, which peaked at No. 42 on US Hot Latin Songs. Its accompanying music video was released the following day; both rappers are seen in a wrestling ring with other sumo wrestlers, with later clips showing women in bikinis. "Teka" was released on 17 April 2024 as the album's fifth single. It peaked at No. 28 on US Hot Latin Songs, No. 21 on US Latin Rhythm Airplay, and No. 11 on US Hot Dance/Electronic Songs. "La Durango" was released on 9 May 2024 as the sixth single from Éxodo. The single was also announced in a trailer featuring McGregor. The song peaked at No. 5 in Mexico, No. 75 on the US Billboard Hot 100, number 2 on US Hot Latin Songs, and No. 83 on the Billboard Global 200.

"Gimme a Second" was released on 25 May 2024 as the co-lead single from the latter's album Life's a Gamble and was also set to be included on Éxodo as its seventh single. "Vino Tinto" was released on 26 June 2024, along with its music video, as the album's eighth single. Following the album's release, it peaked at No. 3 in Mexico, No. 91 on the US Billboard Hot 100, No. 5 on US Hot Latin Songs, and No. 96 on the Billboard Global 200. It received significant airplay, peaking at No. 13 and No. 5 on the US Latin Airplay and Regional Mexican Airplay charts, respectively. "Tommy & Pamela" was then released as the album's ninth single on 18 July 2024. It peaked within the top 10 of Mexico (4) and Puerto Rico (8), while it peaked at No. 137 on the Billboard Global Excl. US chart and No. 24 on the US Hot Latin Songs chart. "La Patrulla" was released as the 10th single from Éxodo on 5 September 2024. It has since peaked atop the chart in Mexico, reached No. 51 on the US Billboard Hot 100, No. 2 on US Hot Latin Songs, and No. 35 on the Billboard Global 200. On December 13, the eleventh single "Hollywood" was released.

== Touring ==
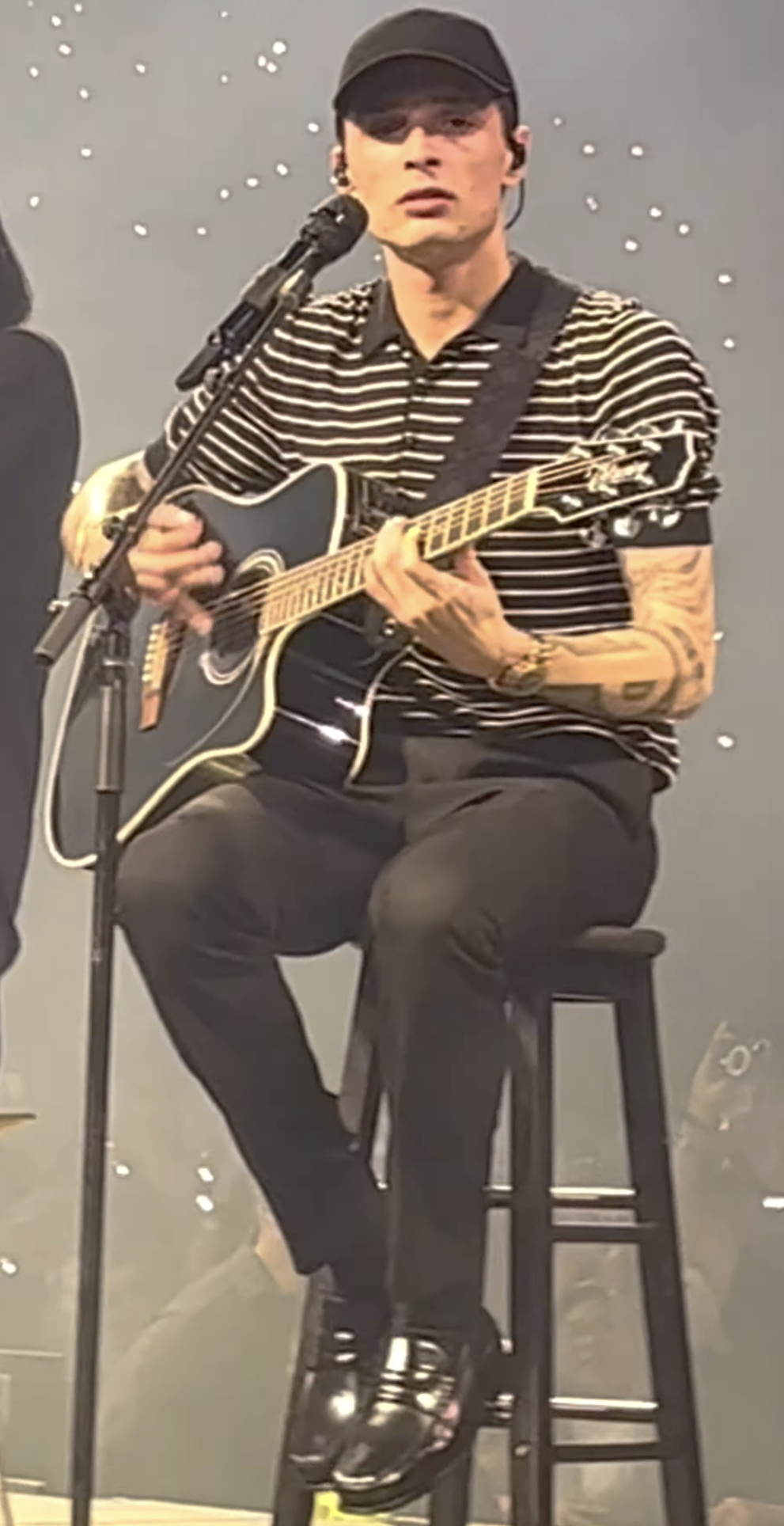
Peso Pluma performing "Nueva Vida" with a guitar in Monterrey.

Peso Pluma announced the Éxodo Tour as his second headlining concert tour in February 2024, which was set to support Éxodo and would have an "all-new show, inclusive of a fully reimagined set design and setlist, featuring his remarkable live band". Promoted by Live Nation Entertainment, the Éxodo Tour was set to begin on 26 May 2024, at the Sueños Music Festival in Chicago, Illinois, which ended up getting cancelled before the singer's performance started due to severe weather. The stadium tour began on 19 July 2024 at Moody Center in Austin, Texas, with two of the tour's scheduled final dates, 16 October at Amalie Arena in Tampa, Florida and 17 October at Kaseya Center in Miami, were cancelled due to Hurricane Milton, with the tour concluding on 13 October in First Horizon Coliseum in Greensboro.

During his 9 June 2024 performance at the 2024 Governors Ball Music Festival, where he also invited Rich the Kid and Jasiel Nuñez as special guests, he fractured his foot on stage and would keep performing instead of ending his show, later confirming on Instagram that he fractured his ankle. He would then confirm that surgery for his ankle was a success and assured that he would continue touring. Due to the injury, several North American tour dates were either postponed or cancelled in between further tour dates, including shows in Nashville, New Orleans and Oklahoma City, where in some shows, Peso Pluma was seen with a medical boot on his right foot. Several album collaborators, including Iván Cornejo, Kenia Os and Tito Double P, have also joined Peso Pluma onstage as surprise guests throughout the tour. Additional invited guests throughout include 50 Cent, Becky G, Cypress Hill, Don Toliver, Gunna, Saweetie, Snoop Dogg and Ty Dolla Sign, among others.

== Critical reception ==
Professional ratings
Aggregate scores
Source	Rating
Metacritic	67/100
Review scores
Source	Rating
AllMusic	3/5 stars
Beats Per Minute	66%
Jenesaispop	5.5/10
NME	4/5 stars
Pitchfork	6.9/10

Upon release, Éxodo received generally favorable reviews from critics. According to Metacritic, which assigns a normalized rating out of 100 to reviews from professional publications, the album received "generally favourable reviews" based on an weighted average score of 67, from four critic scores.

Andrew Sacher of BrooklynVegan stated that the album is "a lengthy undertaking that functions as a great snapshot of just about everything Peso Pluma's capable of". Alicia Civita of The Latin Times considered Éxodo to be a worthwhile addition in Peso Pluma's career, praising the album's production and his attempt on experimentation, "even if it doesn't fully deliver on the promised 'darker' [...] music". In a positive review, Lucas Villa of NME applauded the first disc of the album, stating that the songs within it "are more fiery, fearless and bélico ('badass') than before", and that "he certainly doesn't turn his back on [corridos]" on the second disc. On Suzy Exposito's review for NPR, they stated that "[Peso Pluma's] vulnerable corridos remain his strongest works on Éxodo" and that "Pluma offers listeners a sampler of his budding potential as a multi-genre star".

Steve Forstneger, in their review for Beats Per Minute, said that Éxodo "does [close a chapter] so effectively. The door, however, remains open for the further development of corrido[s]". Isabelia Herrera of Pitchfork praised Peso Pluma's idea to be versatile, although considered the album's second disc to be "littered", adding that "it's particularly tough to hear La Doble P struggle in his ventures outside of corridos tumbados". David Crone of AllMusic noticed that the tracks off the album's first disc are "lyrically indifferent" and added that the production and instrumentals sound "flat and emotionless", having assumed that the album would continue to change the regional Mexican music scene. Rolling Stone's Tomás Mier commented that the album "presents a Peso Pluma we've already met, perhaps with a bit more experience and angst, but still struggling to take the extra risk". In a mixed review, Gabriel Cárcoba of Jenesaispop found the tracks on the first disc as average, but was dissatisfied with the album's second disc and collaborations, stating that his attempt in being versatile does not work and questioning his decision on doing so.

=== Year-end lists ===
In a mid-year list by Billboard, Éxodo was named the best Latin music album of the first half of 2024, with Isabela Raygoza from the publication highlighting Peso Pluma's versatility within the album. Reanna Cruz of Rolling Stone placed it as the 74th best album of 2024. Carl Wilson of Slate placed Éxodo as one of the 12 best albums of 2024, stating that almost every track on the album "sounds like a hit". After Billboard's mid-year list, it was named the second-best Latin music album on the year-end list, with Griselda Flores noting its versatility and how it breaks new ground for regional Mexican music, while collaborating with both national and international artists to establish Peso Pluma as a global artist.

Select year-end rankings of Éxodo
Publication	Accolade	Rank	Ref.
Billboard	The Best Latin Music Albums of 2024	2	
Rolling Stone	The 100 Best Albums of 2024	74	
Slate	The 12 Best Albums of 2024	Placed	

== Accolades ==
Éxodo was nominated for Regional Mexican Album of the Year at the 2024 Billboard Latin Music Awards. It has also received a nomination to win the Grammy Award for Best Música Mexicana Album (including Tejano) at the 67th Annual Grammy Awards. Aside from the album, one of its tracks, "Bellakeo", has received several nominations in various award ceremonies; it won the award for The Perfect Mix at the 2024 Premios Juventud, while it was nominated for the MTV Video Music Award for Best Latin at the 2024 MTV Video Music Awards and Bellakeo Supremo at the 2024 MTV MIAW Awards. At the 2025 American Music Awards, it received a nomination for Favorite Latin Album, while he was nominated for Favorite Latin Male Artist, the first nominations for a Mexican artist since Luis Miguel in 2005.

Awards and nominations for Éxodo
Year	Organization	Category	Result	Ref.
2024	Billboard Latin Music Awards	Regional Mexican Album of the Year	Nominated	
2025	Grammy Awards	Best Música Mexicana Album (including Tejano)	Nominated	
2025	American Music Awards	Favorite Latin Album	Pending	

== Commercial performance ==
Éxodo amassed over 29.8 million global streams on Spotify within its first 24 hours of release, making it the highest debut for a regional Mexican album and a Mexican artist on the platform, surpassing the singer's own third studio album, Génesis (2023). The album also reached the summit of the US Apple Music albums chart. All of the album's tracks debuted on Apple Music's Top 100 song chart for streams in Mexico, with 10 of the tracks charting simultaneously within the top 10; "Vino Tinto" charted the highest, peaking at No. 1. 10 of its tracks also debuted on the platform's Top 100 Global chart. Following the release of the album, Peso Pluma had earned over 12 billion views on YouTube.

Éxodo was released on 20 June 2024 at 8:00 PM EST, which is four hours before 21 June 2024, the start of the next tracking week for Billboard charts. The album debuted at No. 41 and No. 19 on the US Top Latin Albums and Regional Mexican Albums charts on the issue dated 29 June 2024, respectively, with 3,000 album-equivalent units garnered within "one day of activity" In its next full tracking week, it peaked atop both charts with 64,000 album-equivalent units, which only consisted of 87.51 million official streams in the United States within all 24 tracks, becoming Peso Pluma's second number-one album on both charts. It also debuted at No. 5 on the US Billboard 200, becoming his second album to debut within the chart's top five, after Génesis (2023) debuted at No. 3 in July 2023. On its second week on the Billboard 200, the album fell two places down to No. 7, earning 40,000 additional units, summing up total units earned to 107,000. On October 21, 2024, Éxodo was certified undecuple-platinum in the Latin field by the Recording Industry Association of America (RIAA), for attaining sales of 660,000 certified units. In Spain, it debuted at No. 68 on the albums chart published by Productores de Música de España.

On the issue dated 29 June 2024, "Put Em in the Fridge" would become the first track off Éxodo, without being a single, to appear on a song chart before the rest of the tracks, debuting at No. 8 on the US Latin Digital Song Sales chart, making it Peso Pluma's 27th and Cardi B's seventh top-10 single on the chart. On the issue dated 6 July 2024, 20 of the album's tracks were charting simultaneously on the US Hot Latin Songs chart, with only three of its tracks appearing on the US Billboard Hot 100 and Billboard Global 200: "Reloj" (69 and 130) "Vino Tinto" (91 and 96), and "La Patrulla" (99 and 164); additionally, 23 of the album's tracks have reached a certain position within the US Hot Latin Songs chart.

== Track listing ==
Éxodo disc one track listing
No.	Title	Writer(s)	Producer(s)	Length
1.	"La Durango" (with Junior H and Eslabon Armado)	Abraham Reyes Perez; Daniel Hernandez Rangel	Ernesto Fernández; Jesus Iván Leal Reyes; Peso Pluma	4:22
2.	"Me Activo" (with Jasiel Nuñez)	Hassan Emilio Kabande Laija; Jasiel Nuñez; Jesús Eduardo Ontiveros Reyes	Fernández; Leal Reyes; Peso Pluma	2:55
3.	"La Patrulla" (with Netón Vega)	Luis Ernesto Vega Carvajal	Fernández; Leal Reyes; Peso Pluma	2:10
4.	"La People II" (with Tito Double P and Joel de la P)	Jesús Roberto Laija García; Joel Aleicarg Portillo Landeros	Fernández; Jassiel Ramos; Peso Pluma	2:21
5.	"Sr. Smith" (with Luis R. Conriquez)	Laija García	Fernández; Leal Reyes; Peso Pluma	2:41
6.	"Rompe la Dompe" (with Junior H and Óscar Maydon)	Alexis Fierro	Cristian Osorio; El Chachito; Fernandez; Peso Pluma; Junior H; Óscar Maydon; Jimmy Humilde	2:45
7.	"Mami" (with Chino Pacas)	Estevan Plazola; Laija Garcia; Miguel Armenta	Fernández; Leal Reyes; Peso Pluma	3:09
8.	"Belanova" (with Tito Double P)	Daniel Candia; Laija García	Fernández; Leal Reyes; Peso Pluma	2:44
9.	"Bruce Wayne"	Kabande Laija; Plazola	Fernández; Leal Reyes; Peso Pluma	3:34
10.	"Hollywood" (with Estevan Plazola)	Kabande Laija; Plazola	Fernández; Leal Reyes; Peso Pluma	4:44
11.	"Reloj" (with Iván Cornejo)	Alfredo Manzo; Iván Cornejo; Kabande Laija	Fernández; Frank Rio; Leal Reyes; Peso Pluma	3:52
12.	"Ice"	Brandon Israel Barrales Chavez; Dante Luna; Kabande Laija; Ric Flair (Note: Received credit for a cover, an interpolation or the use of a sample.)	Fernández; Leal Reyes; Peso Pluma	4:07
13.	"Solicitado"	Barrales Chavez; Kabande Laija; Yahir Macias Carranza	Fernández; Leal Reyes; Peso Pluma	3:26
14.	"Santal 33" (with Óscar Maydon)	Alexis Fierro; Édgar Barrera; Iván Gamez; Kabande Laija; Ontiveros Reyes; Óscar René Maydon Mesa	Barrera; Fernández; Leal Reyes; Peso Pluma	3:09
15.	"Vino Tinto" (with Natanael Cano and Gabito Ballesteros)	Barrera; Fierro; Gamez; Juliette Lewis; Kabande Laija; Ontiveros Reyes; Maydon; Ricardo Hernández	Barrera; Danny Felix; Fernández; Julia Lewis; Leal Reyes; Peso Pluma	4:29
16.	"14 - 14"	Barrera; Gamez; Manzo; Kabande Laija; Plazola	Barrera; Fernández; Leal Reyes; Peso Pluma	3:07

Éxodo disc two track listing
No.	Title	Writer(s)	Producer(s)	Length
17.	"Gimme a Second" (with Rich the Kid)	Dimitri Leslie Roger; Kabande Laija; Daryl McPherson; Grant Dickinson	DJ Durel; TheLabCook	2:53
18.	"Put Em in the Fridge" (with Cardi B)	Belcalis Marlenis Almánzar; Carlos Alberto Butter Aguila; Akil C. King; Jean C. Hernández Espinell; Kabande Laija; Mateo Dorado; Ryan Vojtesak; Siggy Vazquez Rodriguez	Charlie Handsome; Fresh	2:34
19.	"Pa No Pensar" (with Quavo)	Andrew Watt; Henry Walter; Kabande Laija; Plazola; Quavious Keyate Marshall; Rogét Chahayed	Watt; Cirkut; Chahayed	3:20
20.	"Peso Completo" (with Arcángel)	Austin Santos; Kabande Laija; Carlos Dominguez Kenzo; Jorge Valdés Vazquez; Marvin Hawkins; Robert Rodriguez	Dímelo Flow; Maff	3:13
21.	"Bellakeo" (with Anitta)	Ángel Sandoval; Kabande Laija; Mario Cáceres; Jorge Alberto Erazo; Juan Diego Medina; Juan Daniel Arias; Omar José Pulido Vicari	Cáceres; Jorge Milliano	3:17
22.	"Mala" (with Ryan Castro)	Bryan David Castro Sosa; Kabande Laija; Santiago Orrego Gallego	SOG	2:52
23.	"Tommy & Pamela" (with Kenia Os)	Barrera; Carlos Enrique Ortíz Rivera; Juan Gabriel Rivera; Kabande Laija; Kenia Guadalupe Flores Osuna; Mechi Pieretti	Chris Jedi; Gaby Music	3:29
24.	"Teka" (with DJ Snake)	Kabande Laija; Jean Rodríguez; Jordan Viviant; Justin Quiles Rivera; Nicolas Petitfrère; Sven Grummel; William Grigahcine	DJ Snake	2:43
Total length:				77:56

== Personnel ==
- Ernesto Fernandez – mastering (tracks 1–18, 21, 24), mixing (1–17, 21, 24)
- Mike Bozzi – mastering (track 19)
- Dímelo Flow – mastering, mixing (track 20)
- Beat K Million – mastering, mixing (track 22)
- Patrizio "Teezio" Pigliapoco – mixing (track 18)
- Manny Marroquin – mixing (track 19)
- Jean Rodríguez – engineering, vocal production (tracks 2, 6, 21, 23, 24)
- SOG – engineering (track 22)
- Julia Lewis – vocal production (track 18)
- Cirkut – additional engineering (track 19)
- Julian Vasquez – additional engineering (track 19)
- Marco Sonzini – additional engineering (track 19)
- Paul Lamalfa – additional engineering (track 19)
- Héctor Abner – engineering assistance (track 1)
- DJ Snake – DJing (track 24)

== Charts ==
=== Weekly charts ===
Weekly chart performance for Éxodo
Chart (2024)	Peak position
Spanish Albums (Promusicae)	68
US Billboard 200	5
US Independent Albums (Billboard)	1
US Regional Mexican Albums (Billboard)	1
US Top Latin Albums (Billboard)	1

=== Year-end charts ===
2024 year-end chart performance for Éxodo
Chart (2024)	Position
US Billboard 200	119
US Independent Albums (Billboard)	19
US Regional Mexican Albums (Billboard)	5
US Top Latin Albums (Billboard)	9

2025 year-end chart performance for Éxodo
Chart (2025)	Position
US Billboard 200	65

== Certifications ==
Certifications for Éxodo
Region	Certification	Certified units/sales
Mexico (AMPROFON)	2× Platinum+Gold	350,000^{‡}
United States (RIAA)	3× Diamond (Latin)	1,800,000^{‡}
^{‡} Sales+streaming figures based on certification alone.

== Release history ==
Release dates and formats for Éxodo
Region	Date	Label(s)	Format(s)	Ref.
Various	20 June 2024	Double P	Digital download; streaming	

== See also ==
- 2024 in Latin music
- List of number-one Billboard Latin Albums from the 2020s
