= Jackpot (Belinda Peregrín and Kenia Os song) =

Single by Belinda and Kenia Os

from the album Indómita
- Released: 24 October 2024
- Genre: Latin pop
- Length: 3:13
- Label: Warner Music México
- Songwriters: Belinda Peregrín; Kenia Guadalupe Flores Osuna; Andrés David Restrepo; Daniel Esteban Taborda; Ismael Cano Jr.; Jorge Andrés Villa; Matthew Ray; Mechi Pieretti; Oscar Michael Görres; Santiago García; R. Zastenker
- Producers: Oscar Görres; Rolo; R. Zastenker

Belinda singles chronology
"La Mala" (2024)	"Jackpot" (2024)	"La Cuadrada" (2024)

Music video
- "Jackpot" on YouTube

"Jackpot" (stylized in all caps) is a song by Mexican singers Belinda and Kenia Os released on October 24, 2024, by Warner Music México as the fourth single from Belinda's fifth studio album, Indómita (2025).

== Background and composition ==
The collaboration was announced in July 2024, with the two artists sharing details about the studio recording process and previews of the official video on Instagram. In an interview with Milenio, Belinda talked about what can be heard on her new album: "There are surprises coming: a song with Kenia Os; another collaboration with Los Ángeles Azules. I'm working with people I've admired and respected for a long time; they're going to have a great album because it will have pop, cumbia, regional, very versatile overtones. Belipop returns in October," the artist reported.

In an interview with Rolling Stone en Español, Belinda spoke about what she had been working on with Kenia for this collaboration. She also highlighted the great chemistry that had emerged between them.

Belinda's voice blends effortlessly with Kenia Os's style, creating an irresistible anthem about the thrill of romance. The song's lyrics launch into a whirlwind of emotions as the two artists share a hypnotic chemistry that will leave listeners wanting more. Featuring Belinda's flirtatious performance of "I don't know why I think of you at the club / It's not because of the Hennessy" and Kenia Os' playful energy, the single is a celebration of living in the moment and surrendering to the electrifying spark between two people. Considering that in the video, the artists arrive on an alien planet and play with the natives, which translates to the theme of romantic relationships that the lyrics touch on, it could be said that it is a reference to the fact that every relationship is a step towards meeting the love of your life and that all your history adds up to the ultimate prize. That's why she says, "with you I won the Jackpot."

== Music video ==
The video was directed by Flakka, it comes to life in a dazzling intergalactic party. With a seventies feel, the two singers shine in the video with a retro, evocative and seductive look. Bathed in pink, the clip explodes with color and surreal visual effects, which perfectly complement the euphoria of the song. In the video you can see Belinda and Kenia Os as they venture into space, the video visually reinforces the lyrics, a total adventure into the unknown, like the irresistible attraction they speak of. It is a cosmic celebration that transports fans to a world where love is limitless, daring and out of this world. The official video was published on 24 October 2024, just 16 hours after its release, accumulated more than 670,000 views and was positioned at #4 trending on YouTube.

== Charts ==
Chart performance for "JACKPOT"
Chart (2024)	Peak position
Mexico (Monitor Latino)	5
México Pop (Monitor Latino)	1
Latin Pop Airplay (Billboard)	10

== Certifications ==
Certifications and sales for "Jackpot"
Region	Certification	Certified units/sales
Mexico (AMPROFON)	Gold	70,000^{‡}
^{‡} Sales+streaming figures based on certification alone.

== Awards and nominations ==
Year	Ceremony	Category	Result	Ref.
Premios Lo Nuestro	2025	Best Female Combination	Won	
Socialiteen Awards	2024	Viral Hit of the Year	Won	
