= Cactus (Belinda Peregrín song) =

2024 single by Belinda

Single by Belinda

from the album Indómita
- Released: January 31, 2024
- Genre: Corrido
- Length: 3:04
- Label: Warner Music México
- Songwriters: Belinda Peregrín; José Ángel Pérez Sandoval; Luis Jonuel Gonzalez Maldonado; Starlin Bienvenido Rivas
- Producers: José Pérez; Marcelo Rivera Levy; Mr. Naisgai

Belinda singles chronology
"Me Encantaría" (2022)	"Cactus" (2024)	"300 Noches" (2024)

Music video
- "Cactus" on YouTube

"Cactus" is a song by Mexican singer-songwriter Belinda released on January 31, 2024, by Warner Music México as the lead single from her fifth studio album, Indómita (2025). It is her first single in 10 years since "I Love You... Te Quiero" where she is not a featured artist.

== Background and composition ==
After a decade without releasing new material since “Catarsis” while still collaborating with other artists, Belinda announced her return to music on August 7, 2023, when she signed a contract with Warner Music Group, signifying that the fifth album was once again in the works.

On January 10, 2024, she deleted all her Instagram posts. She teased the song by posting three pictures of a cactus slowly growing, using the hashtags "Renace", "Crece" and "Florece" on January 17, 18 and 19 respectively. The song was eventually released on January 31.

The song was written by Belinda Peregrín, Mr. Naisgai & José Ángel Pérez Sandoval.

=== Lyrical content ===
The song's lyrics were leaked the day before its release and were implied to be about the past relationship she had with Christian Nodal: "Al final no hay bien sin mal y el dolor se pasará. Yo volví, Beli-k...No fuiste lo que esperé de ti, carajo como me hiciste sufrir... De que sirvió tatuarte mis ojos pa' luego borrarlos con otros... Yo nunca dije nada de ti y con mucha clase yo me fui". This was confirmed when another teaser of the video showed a man resembling Nodal and having a tattoo of Belinda's eyes on his chest.

== Music video ==
The music video was released the same day as the song. It was produced by UNCOMMON Productions and directed by Flakka. The video features Belinda wearing a black hat while being chased into the desert by a trio of carry-weaponed men while displaying allusions of her former romance with Christian Nodal.

== Charts ==
Chart performance for "Cactus"
Chart (2024)	Peak position
Bolivia (Monitor Latino)	11
Chile (Monitor Latino)	18
Colombia (Monitor Latino)	10
Costa Rica (Monitor Latino)	8
Ecuador (Monitor Latino)	10
Global Excl. US (Billboard)	194
Guatemala (Monitor Latino)	19
Mexico (Monitor Latino)	1
Mexico (Billboard)	21
Perú Popular (Monitor Latino)	2

== Certifications ==
Certifications and sales for "Cactus"
Region	Certification	Certified units/sales
Mexico (AMPROFON)	Platinum	140,000^{‡}
^{‡} Sales+streaming figures based on certification alone.
