= Tommy & Pamela =

Single by Peso Pluma and Kenia Os

from the album Éxodo
- Language: Spanish
- Released: 18 July 2024
- Genre: Reggaeton
- Length: 3:29
- Label: Double P
- Songwriters: Carlos Enrique Ortíz Rivera; Édgar Barrera; Hassan Emilio Kabande Laija; Juan Gabriel Rivera; Kenia Guadalupe Flores Osuna; Marcos Castro Antoñana; Mechi Pieretti
- Producers: Chris Jedi; Gaby Music; Marshak

Peso Pluma singles chronology
"Vino Tinto" (2024)	"Tommy & Pamela" (2024)	"Los Cuadros" (2024)

Kenia Os singles chronology
"Flow Mamita Rica" (2024)	"Tommy & Pamela" (2024)	"Replay" (2024)

Music video
- "Tommy & Pamela" on YouTube

"Tommy & Pamela" is a song by Mexican singer and rapper Peso Pluma and fellow singer Kenia Os. It was released on 18 July 2024, through Double P Records, as the ninth single from Pluma's fourth studio album Éxodo (2024). The song, titularly and thematically, revolves around the relationship of American musician Tommy Lee and Canadian-American actress Pamela Anderson, as well as their infamous sex tape.

== Background and composition ==
In May 2024, Peso Pluma announced his fourth studio album Éxodo and revealed its track list, where "Tommy & Pamela" appeared as part of the album's second disc, as its seventh track, and the album's 23rd track overall. A titular and thematical reference to the relationship of American musician Tommy Lee and Canadian-American actress Pamela Anderson, "Tommy & Pamela" is a reggaeton song which contains verses that mention the aforementioned couple's infamous sex tape. It is mentioned in the lyric sung by Os, "Grabemos la secuela del sextape de Tommy y Pamela" ("Let's record the sequel to Tommy and Pamela's sextape").

== Release and promotion ==
"Tommy & Pamela" was originally released on 20 June 2024, as the 23rd overall track from Éxodo. It would be released as the album's ninth single on 18 July 2024, with an accompanying music video being released on the same day. In the video, Peso Pluma is seen wearing tattoos, a white shirt and sunglasses, similar to what Lee wore as a drummer for the heavy metal band Mötley Crüe, while Os is seen recreating a scene from the film Barb Wire (1996), in which Anderson stars in.

== Charts ==
Chart performance for "Tommy & Pamela"
Chart (2024)	Peak position
Global Excl. US (Billboard)	137
Mexico (Billboard)	4
Puerto Rico (Monitor Latino)	8
US Hot Latin Songs (Billboard)	24
US Latin Airplay (Billboard)	7
US Latin Rhythm Airplay (Billboard)	2

== Certifications ==
Certifications for "Tommy & Pamela"
Region	Certification	Certified units/sales
Mexico (AMPROFON)	2× Platinum+Gold	350,000^{‡}
^{‡} Sales+streaming figures based on certification alone.
