= Vino Tinto =

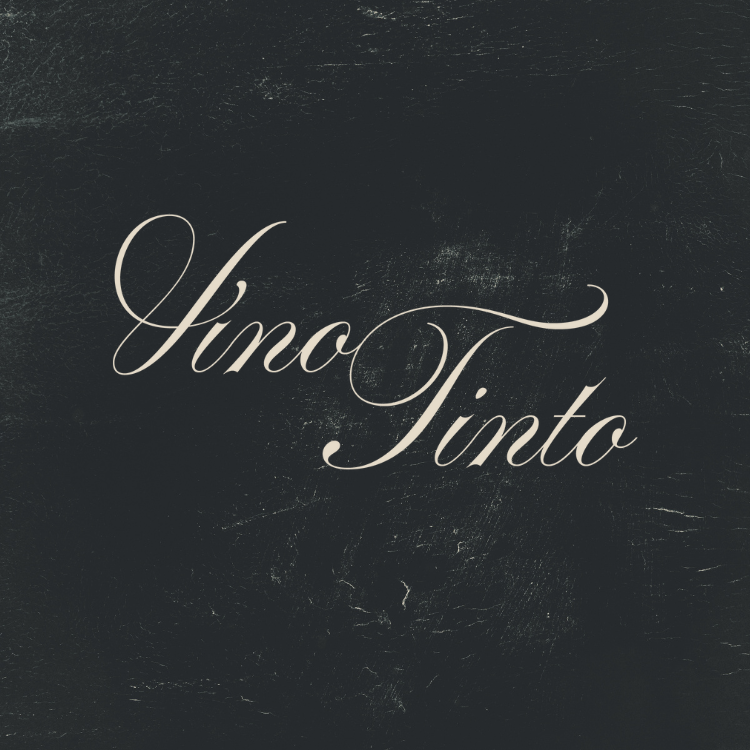
- Website cover artwork

Single by Peso Pluma, Natanael Cano and Gabito Ballesteros

from the album Éxodo
- Language: Spanish
- Released: 26 June 2024
- Genre: Regional Mexican
- Length: 4:29
- Label: Double P
- Songwriters: Abraham Reyes Perez; Alexis Fierro; Daniel Hernandez Rangel; Edgar Barrera; Hassan Emilio Kabande Laija; Iván Gamez; Jesús Eduardo Ontiveros Reyes; Juliette Lewis; Óscar René Maydon Mesa
- Producers: Edgar Barrera; Danny Felix; Julia Lewis; Ernesto Fernández; Jesus Iván Leal Reyes; Peso Pluma

Peso Pluma singles chronology
"Gimme a Second" (2024)	"Vino Tinto" (2024)	"Tommy & Pamela" (2024)

Natanael Cano singles chronology
"YCQVM" (2024)	"Vino Tinto" (2024)	"Primo" (2024)

Gabito Ballesteros singles chronology
"Sin Yolanda" (2024)	"Vino Tinto" (2024)	"Rococo" (2024)

Music video
- "Vino Tinto" on YouTube

"Vino Tinto" (transl. "Red Wine") is a song by Mexican singers Peso Pluma, Natanael Cano and Gabito Ballesteros. It was released on 9 May 2024, through Double P Records, as the eighth single from Pluma's fourth studio album Éxodo (2024), and is the third collaboration between all three singers after their singles "AMG" and "Lucky Charms".

== Background and composition ==
In May 2024, Peso Pluma announced his fourth studio album Éxodo and revealed its track list, where "Vino Tinto" appeared as part of the album's first disc, as its 15th track. "Vino Tinto", which translates to "Red Wine" in English, begins with a synthesizer which revels in transitioning into an "EDM-corrido", instead transitioning into a corrido tumbado.

== Release and promotion ==
"Vino Tinto" was originally released on 20 June 2024, as the 15th track from Éxodo. It was released as the album's eighth single on 26 June 2024, with an accompanying music video being released on the same day. The video stars Peso Pluma, who is seen for the first time in his new hairstyle, as well as Cano and Ballesteros, in a club with several women in different scenes.

== Charts ==
Chart performance for "Vino Tinto"
Chart (2024)	Peak position
Global 200 (Billboard)	96
Mexico (Billboard)	3
US Billboard Hot 100	91
US Hot Latin Songs (Billboard)	5
US Latin Airplay (Billboard)	13
US Regional Mexican Airplay (Billboard)	5

== Certifications ==
Certifications for "Vino Tinto"
Region	Certification	Certified units/sales
Mexico (AMPROFON)	Platinum+Gold	210,000^{‡}
^{‡} Sales+streaming figures based on certification alone.
