= Mírame Feliz =

2025 song by Belinda and Xavi

Single by Belinda and Xavi

from the album Indómita
- Released: 8 May 2025
- Genre: Latin pop; corridos tumbados
- Length: 3:11
- Label: Warner Music México
- Songwriters: Belinda Peregrín; Alex Hernández; Andy Clay; Ángel Sandoval; Fabio Gutiérrez; Ivan Gámez; Joshua Gutierrez; Roberto Zamudio; Salvador laponte
- Producer: Fabio Gutiérrez

Belinda singles chronology
"Blink Twice (Dos Veces Remix)" (2025)	"Mírame Feliz" (2025)

Xavi singles chronology
"Hija de Papi" (2025)	"Mírame Feliz" (2025)

Music video
- "Mírame Feliz" on YouTube

"Mírame Feliz" (lit. 'Look at Me Happy') is a song recorded by Mexican singers Belinda and Xavi. The track was released by Warner Music México on May 8, 2025, as the sixth single from Belinda's fifth studio album, Indómita (2025).

== Background and composition ==
Belinda announced this song on her social media, along with Xavi who rose to prominence in the regional music scene with hits such as "La Diabla" and "La Victima." At the end of April 2025, both artists released a preview of the collaboration they were preparing. In the video shared by Belinda, she could be seen alongside Xavi in a studio in Los Angeles, California. Said footage also revealed that the collaboration was recorded in March 2025. Both Belinda and Xavi expressed their enthusiasm and gratitude for the song's reception. Through their social media, they both shared messages celebrating the achievement.

The song blends romantic pop with hints of regional Mexican music, delivering a powerful message about healing after heartbreak, with lyrics that connect with those who have decided to move forward with their heads held high. "Mírame Feliz" is a modern ballad with regional and pop overtones that addresses the topic of breakups from a mature perspective. The lyrics talk about the sincere desire to see someone who is no longer part of your life heal, and how time allows you to heal the wounds of the past in order to wish happiness to someone you once loved. This message proved to connect strongly with the public, who have expressed on social media that they feel identified with the emotional honesty of the song. "I didn't expect to cry with a song by Belinda and Xavi", "These lyrics saved my day", and "Thank you for giving voice to what many of us feel", were some of the hundreds of comments that could be read on platforms such as YouTube, X and Instagram.

== Music video ==
The music video for "Mírame Feliz" was directed by La Flakka. Directed with a cinematic vision, the video features Belinda and Xavi in various natural and urban settings, symbolically representing the process of healing a past relationship. The use of intimate shots, warm lighting, and carefully chosen aesthetic elements, led to the video being praised by both fans and production experts. The chemistry between the two artists has also been a topic of conversation. Although it is a professional collaboration, the emotional connection they convey on screen has been interpreted by many as an example of the respect and artistic sensibility they share. The music video was filmed in Colima, Mexico, and Belinda was in charge of the visual art, which sought to have dark colors and references to the 90s.

== Charts ==
Chart performance for "Mírame Feliz"
Chart (2025)	Peak position
Peru (Monitor Latino - Popular)	3
Bolivia (Monitor Latino - Popular)	5
Ecuador (Monitor Latino - Popular)	6
Costa Rica (Monitor Latino - Popular)	9
International (Monitor Latino - Popular)	8
