= La Mala =

2024 single by Belinda

Single by Belinda

from the album Indómita
- Released: 15 August 2024
- Genre: Regional mexican; trap
- Length: 2:24
- Label: Warner Music México
- Songwriters: Belinda Peregrín; Alessandra Francesca Bregante; Daniel Rondón; Jonathan Julca; Miguel Ángel Díaz
- Producers: Ángel Sandoval; Jota Rosa; Marcelo Rivera; Palace

Belinda singles chronology
"300 Noches" (2024)	"La Mala" (2024)	"Jackpot" (2024)

Music video
- "La Mala" on YouTube

"La Mala" (lit. 'the bad one'; stylized in all caps) is a song recorded by Mexican singer-songwriter Belinda. It was released through Warner Music México on August 15, 2024, as the third single from her fifth studio album, Indómita (2025).

== Background and composition ==
The song addresses Belinda's personal experience of being publicly exposed and judged, especially after her relationship with singer Christian Nodal. She recounted in an interview that she felt strongly identified with the story, as part of how the public has portrayed her as ruthless, a bad woman, a bad person, to which she comments that they don't know her, and this song is a response to the people who judged her this way.

The lyrics for La mala are laden with messages that allude to her controversial romances and her critics. It also contains some explicit sections, which has led to it being labeled "Parental Advisory: Explicit Content." With the song, Belinda also sought to convey a message of empowerment for women, encouraging them to feel strong and confident. "It's a character of a woman who gets hated and she's like a witch, the witch of the place that everyone is judging," Belinda commented in an interview with El Universal, making it clear that the image that has been built on her on social networks. In an interview for Spotify Mexico, Belinda revealed details about her new single, 'La Mala', where she explained that what she likes most about the song is its unique fusion of rhythms, which combines regional elements with trap.

== Music video ==
The three-minute, 17-second video for "La mala" shows Belinda on a visual journey steeped in symbolism and social criticism. From the beginning of the video, Belinda is presented with an evocative image of Mary Magdalene, a historical and religious figure known for being the subject of judgment and criticism. This symbolism highlights the song's central theme, which is about the painful experience of being exposed and mercilessly criticized. Women are also seen making a woven mask for Belinda, symbolizing how the media has tried to create an image of her that does not represent her; in the crowd, these people also want to lynch her despite the fact that they are the ones who constructed that narrative. These images illustrate how a distorted identity has been fabricated that hides her true essence. The video was directed by Salomón Simhon.

== Charts ==
Chart performance for "La mala"
Chart (2024)	Peak position
Mexico (Monitor Latino)	1
Annual list (2024)	Peak position
México (Monitor Latino)	52
México Pop (Monitor Latino)	36
Internacional Popular (Monitor Latino)	79

== Awards and nominations ==
Year	Ceremony	Category	Result	Ref.
Berlin Music Video Awards	2025	Best Director	Pending	
