= Indómita =

2025 studio album by Belinda Peregrín

Studio album by Belinda
- Released: June 5, 2025
- Recorded: 2023–2025
- Genres: Pop; regional mexican; urbano; electropop
- Language: Spanish
- Label: Warner Music Group

Belinda chronology
Catarsis (2013)	Indómita (2025)

Singles from Indómita
- 1. "Cactus" Released: January 31, 2024; 2. "300 Noches" Released: April 25, 2024; 3. "LA MALA" Released: August 15, 2024; 4. "JACKPOT" Released: October 25, 2024; 5. "La Cuadrada" Released: January 16, 2025; 6. "Mírame Feliz" Released: May 8, 2025

Indómita (Spanish for "Indomitable") is the fifth studio album by Spanish-Mexican singer-songwriter Belinda. It was released on June 5, 2025 through Warner Music Group and is her first studio album since Catarsis (2013).

== Background and release ==
On August 7, 2023, Belinda announced her return to music, having signed a new label contract with Warner Music Group, expressing how she had lost faith in the industry and is thankful that collaborating with the aforementioned artists has helped rediscover herself. On January 17, 2024, Belinda deleted all the posts from her Instagram profile, and teased the album's lead single "Cactus", which was released on January 31.

== Track listing ==
No.	Title	Writer(s)	Producer(s)	Length
1.	"Cursi De +"	Belinda, Carlos Alberto Butter, Adriana Cabral Vázquez, Jean Carlos Hernández, José Ángel Pérez, Roberto Zamudio Ramos	José Ángel Pérez, Yann C, Marcelo Rivera	3:22
2.	"300 Noches" (featuring Natanael Cano)	Belinda, Nathanahel Rubén Cano Monge, Andy Bauza, Luis Jonuel González, Manuel Alejandro Narrad Sánchez, José Ángel Pérez, Sara Schell	Marcelo Rivera Levy, Mr. Naisgai, José Ángel Pérez	3:24
3.	"Aries"	Belinda, Angel Sandoval, Daniel Rondon, Juan Vegas, JULiA LEWiS	JULiA LEWiS	3:04
4.	"Mírame Feliz" (featuring Xavi)	Belinda, Alex Hernández, Andy Clay, Ivan Gámez, Joshua Gutiérrez, Roberto Zamudio, Salvador laponte, José Ángel Sandoval	Fabio Gutiérrez	3:11
5.	"Never Not Love You" (featuring Thirty Seconds to Mars)	Belinda, Jared Leto, Shannon Leto, Stefan Johnson, Jordan Johnson, Michael Pollack, Ammar Malik, Marcus Lomax, Jon Bellion, Oliver Peterhof	JULiA LEWiS, Marcelo Rivera	3:15
6.	"Rayo McQueen" (featuring Alemán)	Belinda, Alemán, América Sierra, Angel Sandoval, NaisGai	NaisGai, Cozy Coz	3:30
7.	"Interludio"	Belinda	B. Vou	0:16
8.	"La Cuadrada" (featuring Tito Double P)	Belinda, Jesús Roberto Laija García, José Ángel Pérez	Marcelo Rivera Levy, Tito Double P, José Ángel Pérez	2:40
9.	"LA MALA"	Belinda, Daniel Rondón, Essa Gante, Johnny Julca, Miguel Ángel Díaz	Jota Rosa, Marcelo Rivera, Palace, José Ángel Pérez	2:24
10.	"DEATH NOTE"	Belinda, Jota Rosa	Jota Rosa	3:07
11.	"Silvana"	Belinda, Dani Raw, JULiA LEWiS, María José De la Torre Villaseñor	JULiA LEWiS	2:24
12.	"+ Perra + Bitch" (featuring Netón Vega)	Belinda, Netón Vega, O' Neill	Sean Turk	3:18
13.	"Wet Dreams" (featuring Tokischa)	Belinda, Tokischa Altagracia Peralta, Okei Flou	Okei Flou	2:44
14.	"Heterocromía"	Belinda, Angel Sandoval, Whitestar, Ehxx The Professor	Ehxx The Professor, Kingswifft	3:45
15.	"JACKPOT" (featuring Kenia Os)	Belinda, Kenia Flores Osuna, Andrés David Restrepo, Ismael Cano, Jr., Jorge Andrés Villa, Daniel Esteban Taborda, Matthew Rey, Mechi Pieretti, Oscar Görres, Santiago García, R. Zastenker	Rolo, LIOHN, OZGO	3:13
16.	"Van Gogh" (featuring Mala Rodríguez)	Belinda, Angel Sandoval, Bull Nene, JULiA LEWiS, Mala Rodríguez Garrido	JULiA LEWiS	3:05
17.	"Cactus"	Belinda, Starlin Rivas Bienvenido, José Ángel Pérez, Luis Jonuel González Maldonado	Marcelo Rivera Levy, Mr. Naisgai, José Ángel Pérez	3:03
Total length:				49:54

== Charts ==
=== Weekly charts ===
Chart (2025)	Peak position
US Latin Pop Albums (Billboard)	12
