= Hollywood (Estevan Plazola song) =

2020 single by Estevan Plazola

Single by Estevan Plazola

from the album Infinit
- Language: Spanish
- Released: 31 July 2020
- Length: 3:44
- Label: Rancho Humilde
- Songwriter: Estevan Plazola
- Producer: Jimmy Humilde

Estevan Plazola singles chronology
"19 Años" (2018)	"Hollywood" (2020)	"Joder Amor" (2021)

Music video
- "Hollywood" on YouTube

"Hollywood"

Single by Peso Pluma and Estevan Plazola

from the album Éxodo
- Language: Spanish
- Released: 13 December 2024
- Length: 4:44
- Label: Double P
- Songwriter: Estevan Plazola
- Producers: Ernesto Fernández; Jesus Iván Leal Reyes; Peso Pluma

Music video
- "Hollywood" on YouTube

"Hollywood" is a song written and performed by American singer Estevan Plazola, which was originally released as a single on 31 July 2020, through Rancho Humilde, from his live album Infinit (2020). A re-recorded duet-cover version with fellow singer and rapper Peso Pluma was released on 20 June 2024, through Double P Records, as part of the former's fourth studio album Éxodo (2024).

== Background and composition ==
"Hollywood" was released as a single by Plazola in 2020, through Rancho Humilde. After he met Peso Pluma, they would re-record the song together. "Hollywood" is a song where its lyrics revolve around being abused as a child and gaining eventual fame, while it is entirely an ode to Hollywood, Los Angeles. He stated that it is about "our reality [and] how our lives went through this process — getting famous, getting money [and] getting what we've wanted since we were kids".

== Release and reception ==
The original version of "Hollywood", performed by Plazola, was released on July 31, 2020, through Rancho Humilde. The re-recorded version of the song, which features Peso Pluma, was released on 20 June 2024, as the 10th track from his fourth studio album Éxodo and later, on December 13, was released as the eleventh single overall. It was named the 11th best track from the album by Billboard, and also peaked at number 11 on the US Hot Latin Songs chart after it was released. On 10 November 2024, both artists performed "Hollywood" at the 2024 MTV Europe Music Awards, where Peso Pluma also won the award for Best Latin.

== Charts ==
Chart performance for "Hollywood"
Chart (2024–2025)	Peak position
Global 200 (Billboard)	143
Mexico (Billboard)	14
US Bubbling Under Hot 100 (Billboard)	8
US Hot Latin Songs (Billboard)	11

== Certifications ==
Certifications for "Hollywood"
Region	Certification	Certified units/sales
Mexico (AMPROFON)	2× Platinum+Gold	350,000^{‡}
^{‡} Sales+streaming figures based on certification alone.
