= 300 Noches =

2024 single by Belinda and Natanael Cano

Single by Belinda and Natanael Cano

from the album Indómita
- Released: 25 April 2024
- Genre: Corridos tumbados
- Length: 3:24
- Label: Warner Music México
- Songwriters: José Ángel Pérez Sandoval; Luis Jonuel Gonzalez Maldonado; Manuel Alejandro "Mannel" larrad Sánchez; Sara Schell; White Star
- Producers: Ángel Sandoval; Marcelo Rivera Levy; Mr. Naisgai

Belinda singles chronology
"Cactus" (2024)	"300 Noches" (2024)	"La Mala" (2024)

Natanael Cano singles chronology
"Natanael Cano: Bzrp Music Sessions, Vol. 59" / "Entre Las de 20" (2024)	"300 Noches" (2024)	"Ya Te Olvidé" (2024)

Music video
- "300 Noches" on YouTube

"300 Noches" (lit. '300 nights') is a song by Mexican singers Belinda and Natanael Cano. The track was released by Warner Music México on April 25, 2024, as the second single from Belinda's fifth studio album, Indómita (2025).

== Background ==
On 12 April 2024, Belinda announced her collaboration with Natanael Cano and shared photos with a new look, as it was the style she wore for the music video for "300 Noches." "I loved being able to collaborate with Beli for this song. I'm a fan of hers and I'm glad to see more female artists raising the flag of corridos tumbados. Belinda added her flirtatious touch and it was magical," said Cano in an interview.

=== Lyrical content ===
The lyrics of the copla reflect the story of a person who regrets not forgetting their former partner, despite the fact that the partner hurt them, but they can't get over her. The music contains, according to Rolling Stone, "strumming of the requinto guitar," as well as classic elements of corridos with a more pop piano."

== Music video ==
The music video was released the same day as the song. It was directed by Flakka. In it, the two can be seen very affectionate in various scenes, as they represent the lovers of its plot. Visually, the video is marked by a color palette where red predominates, presenting a minimalist and cinematic narrative. The presence of images related to the zodiac sign Taurus, as well as the presence of the "Beliseñal" in the video, speculate that the song is directed at footballer Giovani Dos Santos, with whom Belinda was previously in a relationship.

== Charts ==
Chart performance for "300 Noches"
Chart (2024)	Peak position
Latin Pop Airplay (Billboard)	13
Hot Latin Songs (Billboard)	41
Billboard Global 200 (Billboard)	182
Global Excl. US (Billboard)	114
Mexico (Monitor Latino)	1
Mexico Songs (Billboard)	4
Annual list (2024)	Peak position
México (Monitor Latino)	5
México Pop (Monitor Latino)	7
México Popular (Monitor Latino)	75
Chile Popular (Monitor Latino)	96
Ecuador Popular (Monitor Latino)	29
Internacional (Monitor Latino)	97
Internacional Popular (Monitor Latino)	26

== Certifications ==
Certifications and sales for "300 Noches"
Region	Certification	Certified units/sales
Mexico (AMPROFON)	3× Platinum	420,000^{‡}
^{‡} Sales+streaming figures based on certification alone.

== Awards and nominations ==
Year	Ceremony	Category	Result	Ref.
BreakTudo Awards	2024	Latin Hit of the Year	Won	
MTV MIAW Awards	2024	Collaboration of the Year	Nominated	
Hollywood Music Video Awards	2025	Best Latin	Nominated	
