= Peso Completo =

Single by Peso Pluma and Arcángel

from the album Éxodo
- Language: Spanish
- Released: 11 April 2024
- Genre: Latin trap
- Length: 3:13
- Label: Double P
- Songwriters: Austin Santos; Carlos Dominguez; Hassan Emilio Kabande Laija; Jorge Valdés Vazquez; Marvin Hawkins; Robert Rodriguez
- Producer: Dímelo Flow

Peso Pluma singles chronology
"Humo" (2024)	"Peso Completo" (2024)	"Teka" (2024)

Arcángel singles chronology
"X'clusivo" (remix) (2024)	"Peso Completo" (2024)	"Pueblo de Medallo" (2024)

Music video
- "Peso Completo" on YouTube

"Peso Completo" is a song by Mexican rapper Peso Pluma and American rapper Arcángel. It was released on 11 April 2024, through Double P Records. It is the second collaboration between both singers, after the 2023 single "La Chamba", and serves as the fourth single from Peso Pluma's fourth studio album Éxodo (2024).

== Background ==
Both singers previously collaborated on "La Chamba", which was the lead single for Arcángel's eighth studio album Sentimiento, Elegancia y Más Maldad (2023). Peso Pluma teased the song through Instagram Stories and would also reveal that he and Arcángel would be collaborating with each other for the second time. On the same platform, the former went live and confirmed that "Peso Completo" wasn't going to be a corrido tumbado or a reggaeton song, but a Latin trap song instead. He also said that it would be one of the singles for his upcoming album Éxodo (2024). Dímelo Flow would later confirm that he produced the song.

== Music video ==
Its music video was released on 12 April 2024. Starring both singers, they are seen rapping in a wrestling ring with other sumo wrestlers, with later clips showing women in bikinis.

== Charts ==
Chart performance for "Peso Completo"
Chart (2024)	Peak position
Honduras Urbano (Monitor Latino)	19
US Hot Latin Songs (Billboard)	42
