= 7 Días =

2025 single by Gabito Ballesteros and Tito Double P

Single by Gabito Ballesteros and Tito Double P

from the album Ya No Se Llevan Serenatas
- Released: 30 January 2025
- Genre: Regional Mexican
- Length: 3:00
- Label: Los CT; Interscope
- Songwriters: Gabriel Ballesteros Abril; Jesús Lajia García; Miguel Armenta; Jorge Jiménez Sanchez
- Producers: Gabito Ballesteros; L. Prince

Gabito Ballesteros singles chronology
"Que Pedo" (2025)	"7 Días" (2025)	"Perdido" (2025)

Tito Double P singles chronology
"Rosones" (2024)	"7 Días" (2025)	"Tattoo" (2025)

Music video
- "7 Días" on YouTube

"7 Días" is a song by Mexican singer Gabito Ballesteros and Mexican rapper Tito Double P, released on 30 January 2025. It was written by the artists alongside Miguel Armenta and Jorge Jiménez Sanchez and produced by Ballestros himself and L. Prince.

== Composition ==
"7 Días" is a regional Mexican song about one struggling with anxiety, despair, melancholy and repentance after breaking up. It depicts a man feeling desperate because his partner has not answered him in seven days. Gabito Ballesteros tries to live in excess to distract himself, while Tito Double P desperately hopes his ex-partner still loves him. They also deal with moving on. This could be a sequel single to Tito Double P's single "Dos Días" in collaboration with his cousin Peso Pluma from his debut album "INCÓMODO".

== Charts ==
=== Weekly charts ===
Weekly chart performance for "7 Días"
Chart (2025)	Peak position
Global 200 (Billboard)	39
US Billboard Hot 100	84
US Hot Latin Songs (Billboard)	11
US Billboard Hot Regional Mexican Songs	5
Mexico (Billboard)	1

=== Year-end charts ===
Year-end chart performance for "7 Días"
Chart (2025)	Position
US Hot Latin Songs (Billboard)	32
