= Tito Double P =

Mexican singer-songwriter (born 1997)

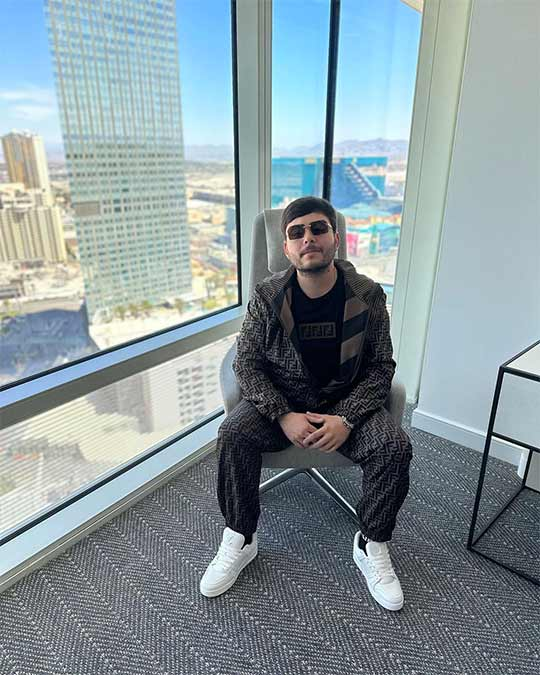
- Tito Double P

Background information
- Born: Jesús Roberto Laija García; 18 August 1997 (age 29); Tepic, Nayarit, Mexico
- Origin: Culiacán, Sinaloa, Mexico
- Genres: Regional Mexican; corridos bélicos
- Occupations: Singer-songwriter; record producer
- Years active: 2023–present
- Label: Double P

Jesús Roberto Laija García (born 18 August 1997), known professionally as Tito Double P, is a Mexican singer-songwriter and record producer. He is best known as the cousin of fellow musician Peso Pluma and has written several songs within his discography. He released his debut studio album Incómodo (2024) on 22 August 2024, which debuted at number 20 on the US Billboard 200.

== Life and career ==
Laija was born in Tepic, Nayarit, Mexico on 18 August 1997, and was raised in Culiacán. In 2021, he began posting videos of him singing corridos on social media, later attracting the attention of his cousin, Peso Pluma, who was interested in starting a music career at the time and invited him to Culiacán.

In 2023, after being convinced by Peso Pluma and other musicians, Laija endured in a solo music career, releasing his debut single "Dembow Bélico", with Luis R. Conriquez and Joel de la P on 3 June 2023, later appearing on two songs from Peso Pluma's third studio album Génesis (2023); "Gavilán II" and "La People".

In February 2024, Laija made his first entry on the US Billboard Hot 100 with "La People II", which debuted and peaked at number 69. On 22 August of the same year, he released his debut studio album Incómodo (2024), which debuted at number 20 on the US Billboard 200. Originally debuting at number two on both US Top Latin Albums and Regional Mexican Albums charts, it later peaked atop both charts in its fifth week.

== Discography ==
=== Studio albums ===
List of studio albums, with selected details and chart positions
Title	Details	Peak chart positions			Certifications
Title	Details	US	US Latin	US Reg. Mex.	Certifications
Incómodo	Released: 22 August 2024; Label: Double P; Formats: Digital download, streaming	11	1	1	RIAA: 26× Platinum (Latin); AMPROFON: Diamond+2× Platinum
Acomodo	Released: 28 May 2026; Label: Double P; Formats: Digital download, streaming	41	3	1	RIAA: 5× Platinum (Latin)

==== Collaborative studio albums ====
List of collaborative albums, with selected details
Title	Details	Peak chart positions			Certifications
Title	Details	US	US Latin	US Reg. Mex.	Certifications
Dinastía (with Peso Pluma)	Released: 25 December 2025; Label: Double P; Formats: Digital download, streaming	6	1	1	RIAA: Diamond (Latin)

=== Singles ===
List of singles, with selected chart positions, and album name
Title	Year	Peak chart positions				Certifications	Album
Title	Year	MEX	US	US Latin	WW	Certifications	Album
"Dembow Bélico" (with Luis R. Conriquez and Joel de la P)	2023	15	—	35	—	RIAA: 6× Platinum (Latin)	Incómodo
"La 701" (with Luis R. Conriquez)	2023	—	—	—	—		Non-album single
"Andamos Francos" (with Joaquin Medina)	2023	—	—	—	—		Jota Eme
"Sin Tanto Royo" (with Luis R. Conriquez)	2023	—	—	35	—		Corridos Bélicos, Vol. IV
"Tenido" (with Gabito Ballesteros)	2023	—	—	—	—		Incómodo
"Te Quiero Así" (with Luis R. Conriquez and Joel de la P)	2023	—	—	—	—		Non-album singles
"El Relojito" (with Los Dareyes de la Sierra)	2024	—	—	—	—		Non-album singles
"La Bestia" (with Código FN and Rafael Amaya)	2024	—	—	—	—		Non-album singles
"La People II" (with Peso Pluma and Joel de la P)	2024	4	69	2	61		Éxodo
"Deltas"	2024	—	—	—	—		Non-album singles
"Lujo y Detalle" (with Jasiel Nuñez)	2024	—	—	—	—		Non-album singles
"ALV (Remix)" (with Manuelvezz and Joaquin Medina)	2024	—	—	—	—		Non-album singles
"Linda" (with Netón Vega)	2024	11	—	18	—		Incómodo
"La Fiesta" (with Luis R. Conriquez and José Guicho)	2024	—	—	—	—		Non-album singles
"PPP" (with El Jordan 23)	2024	—	—	—	—		Non-album singles
"Como el GTA" (with Joel de la P)	2024	—	—	—	—		Non-album singles
"Lunetas" (with Adriel Favela and Juanchito)	2024	—	—	—	—		Non-album singles
"Primo" (with Natanael Cano)	2024	12	—	24	—		Incómodo
"Los Cuadros" (with Peso Pluma)	2024	6	— (Note: "Los Cuadros" did not enter the Billboard Hot 100, but peaked at number five on the Bubbling Under Hot 100 chart.)	6	157		Incómodo
"Nadie"	2024	2	78	7	41	RIAA: Diamond (Latin)	Acomodo
"Rosones"	2024	1	76	4	34	RIAA: 9× Platinum (Latin)	Acomodo
"La Cuadrada" (with Belinda)	2025	—	—	—	—		Indómita
"7 Días" (with Gabito Ballesteros)	2025	1	84	11	39		Ya No Se Llevan Serenatas
"Tattoo"	2025	1	72	5	35	RIAA: 2× Platinum (Latin)	Acomodo
"Vita Fer" (with Los Dareyes de la Sierra)	2025	1	—	22	74		Redención
"Champagne"	2025	6	—	18	126		Acomodo
"Corazón Partío"	2025	6	—	25	151		Non-album single
"Por Sus Besos"	2025	1	— (Note: "Por Sus Besos" did not enter the Billboard Hot 100, but peaked at number eight on the Bubbling Under Hot 100 chart.)	10	49		Acomodo
"Intro" (with Peso Pluma)	2025	6	— (Note: "Intro" did not enter the Billboard Hot 100, but peaked at number 9 on the Bubbling Under Hot 100 chart.)	8	125		Dinastía
"Chiclona" (with Peso Pluma and Lencho)	2026	3	— (Note: "Chiclona" did not enter the Billboard Hot 100, but peaked at number five on the Bubbling Under Hot 100 chart.)	5	120		Dinastía
"Marianita" (with Peso Pluma and Rey Quinto)	2026	—	—	35	—		Dinastía
"Ganga" (with Peso Pluma and El Randal)	2026	8	—	15	—		Dinastía
"London" (with Peso Pluma and Armenta)	2026	15	—	19	—		Dinastía
"Pase y Pase"	2026	—	—	23	—		Acomodo
"Olivia La Flaka" (with Natanael Cano, Victor Mendivil and Ovi)	2026	2	—	9	46		Non-album single

=== Other charted songs ===
List of other charted songs, with selected chart positions, certifications and album name
Title	Year	Peak chart positions				Album
Title	Year	MEX	US	US Latin	WW	Album
"Gavilán II" (with Peso Pluma)	2023	—	— (Note: "Gavilán II" did not enter the Billboard Hot 100, but peaked at number four on the Bubbling Under Hot 100 chart.)	24	—	Génesis
"La People" (with Peso Pluma)	2023	12	— (Note: "La People" did not enter the Billboard Hot 100, but peaked at number six on the Bubbling Under Hot 100 chart.)	12	164	Génesis
"Belanova" (with Peso Pluma)	2024	24	—	24	—	Éxodo
"5-7" (with Junior H)	2024	10	—	27	—	Incómodo
"Chino" (with Netón Vega)	2024	—	—	42	—	Incómodo
"El Lokerón"	2024	1	73	5	27	Incómodo
"Ay Mamá" (with Grupo Frontera)	2024	6	—	17	153	Incómodo
"Dos Días" (with Peso Pluma)	2024	2	51	3	31	Incómodo
"Blanca, Rosita y María"	2024	23	—	—	—	Incómodo
"Escápate" (with Chino Pacas)	2024	3	— (Note: "Escápate" did not enter the Billboard Hot 100, but peaked at number one on the Bubbling Under Hot 100 chart.)	9	55	Incómodo
"Chiquita" (with Netón Vega)	2025	22	—	32	—	Mi Vida Mi Muerte
"Dopamina" (with Peso Pluma)	2025	2	52	2	20	Dinastía
"Ni Pedo" (with Peso Pluma)	2025	6	76	8	74	Dinastía
"Putielegante" (with Peso Pluma)	2025	11	— (Note: "Putielegante" did not enter the Billboard Hot 100, but peaked at number 17 on the Bubbling Under Hot 100 chart.)	14	146	Dinastía
"7-3" (with Peso Pluma)	2025	9	— (Note: "7-3" did not enter the Billboard Hot 100, but peaked at number 2 on the Bubbling Under Hot 100 chart.)	9	53	Dinastía
"Billete" (with Peso Pluma)	2025	—	—	15	—	Dinastía
"Daño" (with Peso Pluma)	2025	4	75	7	66	Dinastía
"Trucha" (with Peso Pluma)	2025	—	—	18	—	Dinastía
"Morras II" (with Peso Pluma)	2025	—	—	24	—	Dinastía
"Mezcal" (with Peso Pluma)	2025	—	—	22	—	Dinastía
"Malibu" (with Peso Pluma)	2025	—	—	23	—	Dinastía
"20s" (with Peso Pluma)	2025	—	—	27	—	Dinastía
"Viejo Lobo" (with Peso Pluma)	2025	—	—	30	—	Dinastía
"Tú Con Él" (with Peso Pluma)	2025	—	—	25	—	Dinastía
"Bckpckbyz" (with Peso Pluma)	2025	3	79	9	58	Dinastía
"Me Vale V"	2026	10	— (Note: "Me Vale V" did not enter the Billboard Hot 100, but peaked at number 21 on the Bubbling Under Hot 100 chart.)	10	—	Acomodo

=== Guest appearances ===
List of non-single guest appearances, with other performing artists, showing year released and album name
Title	Year	Other artist(s)	Album
"Gavilán II"	2023	Peso Pluma	Génesis
"La People"	2023	Peso Pluma	Génesis
"Traka"	2023	El Alfa	El Rey del Dembow
"Bélicos"	2024	Luis R. Conriquez	Corridos Bélicos, Vol. IV
"Cuándo Andaba Recio (El Cholo)"	2024	Lenin Ramírez	Bien Positivo
"A Qué Sabes"	2024	Lenin Ramírez	Bien Positivo
"Belikon"	2024	Gabito Ballesteros and Luis R. Conriquez	The GB
"Belanova"	2024	Peso Pluma	Éxodo
"Crisis"	2024	Becky G	Encuentros

== Awards and nominations ==
Award	Year	Category	Nominee / work	Result	Ref.
American Music Awards	2026	Best Male Latin Artist	Himself	Nominated	
American Music Awards	2026	Best Latin Album	"DINASTÍA" (with Peso Pluma)	Nominated	
Billboard Latin Music Awards	2026	Artist of the Year	Himself	Pending	
Billboard Latin Music Awards	2026	Hot Latin Songs Artist of the Year, Male	Himself	Pending	
Billboard Latin Music Awards	2026	Top Latin Albums Artist of the Year, Male	Himself	Pending	
Billboard Latin Music Awards	2026	Regional Mexican Artist of the Year, Solo	Himself	Pending	
Billboard Latin Music Awards	2026	Top Latin Album of the Year	Dinastía	Pending	
Billboard Latin Music Awards	2026	Top Regional Mexican Album of the Year	Dinastía	Pending	
Billboard Latin Music Awards	2026	Global 200 Latin Song of the Year	"Daño" (with Peso Pluma)	Pending	
Billboard Latin Music Awards	2026	Hot Latin Song of the Year	"Daño" (with Peso Pluma)	Pending	
Billboard Latin Music Awards	2026	Hot Latin Song of the Year, Vocal Event	"Daño" (with Peso Pluma)	Pending	
Billboard Latin Music Awards	2026	Streaming Song of the Year	"Daño" (with Peso Pluma)	Pending	
Billboard Latin Music Awards	2026	Regional Mexican Song of the Year	"Daño" (with Peso Pluma)	Pending	
Billboard Latin Music Awards	2026	Hot Latin Song of the Year	"Dopamina" (with Peso Pluma)	Pending	
Billboard Latin Music Awards	2026	Hot Latin Song of the Year, Vocal Event	"Dopamina" (with Peso Pluma)	Pending	
Billboard Latin Music Awards	2026	Hot Latin Song of the Year, Vocal Event	"7-3" (with Peso Pluma)	Pending	
Billboard Latin Music Awards	2026	Hot Latin Song of the Year, Vocal Event	"Chiclona" (with Peso Pluma & Lencho)	Pending	
Latin Grammy Award	2025	Best Contemporary Mexican Music Album	Incómodo	Nominated	
Latin Grammy Award	2026	Best Contemporary Mexican Music Album	Dinastía	Pending	
Premio Lo Nuestro	2025	Mexican Music - New Artist	Himself	Nominated	
Premio Lo Nuestro	2025	Mexican Music - Collaboration Of The Year	"Dos Días" (with Tito Double P)	Nominated	
Premio Lo Nuestro	2026	Mexican Music – Best Electro Corrido	"La Fiesta" (with Luis R Conriquez & José Guicho)	Nominated	
Premio Lo Nuestro	2026	Mexican Music - Collaboration Of The Year	"Crisis" (with Becky G)	Nominated	
Premios Juventud	2025	New Generation – Mexican Music	Tito Double P	Won	
Premios Juventud	2025	The Perfect Collab	"La Cuadrada" (with Belinda)	Won	
Premios Juventud	2025	Best Mexican Music Fusion	"Dos Días" (with Peso Pluma)	Nominated	
Premios Juventud	2026	Best Mexican Music Album	Dinastía (with Peso Pluma)	Nominated	
Premios Juventud	2026	Best Mexican Music Fusion	"Dopamina" (with Peso Pluma)	Nominated	
