= Billboard Latin Music Award for Streaming Song of the Year =

Annual American music award

- Current: 2025 Billboard Latin Music Awards
- Awarded for: the most streamed Latin songs in Billboard magazine
- Country: United States
- Presented by: Billboard
- First award: 2013
- Final award: 2025
- Currently held by: "DTMF" by Bad Bunny (2025)

Highlights
- Most awards: Bad Bunny (3); Nicky Jam (3)
- Most nominations: Bad Bunny (10)
- Website: billboardevents.com

The Billboard Latin Music Award for Streaming Song of the Year is an honor presented annually at the Billboard Latin Music Awards, a ceremony which honors "the most popular albums, songs, and performers in Latin music, as determined by the actual sales, radio airplay, online streaming and social data that informs Billboard's weekly charts." The award is given to the best performing singles on Billboard's Latin Streaming Songs chart, which measures the most streamed Spanish-language recordings "on leading online music services" in the United States. The list was established by the magazine on April 20, 2013.

Bad Bunny and Nicky Jam are the most awarded acts in the category with three wins each. Only Enrique Iglesias, Peso Pluma and Nicky Jam have won twice in a row. Karol G became the first female artist to win in 2024. Bad Bunny is the most nominated artist, with ten. He is also the only act to be nominated four times in a single year (2021), with himself (2025) and Peso Pluma (2023) right behind with three nominations each in a single year. Romeo Santos is the most nominated artist without a win, with seven. As of 2025, the holder is Bad Bunny for the song "DTMF".

== Recipients ==
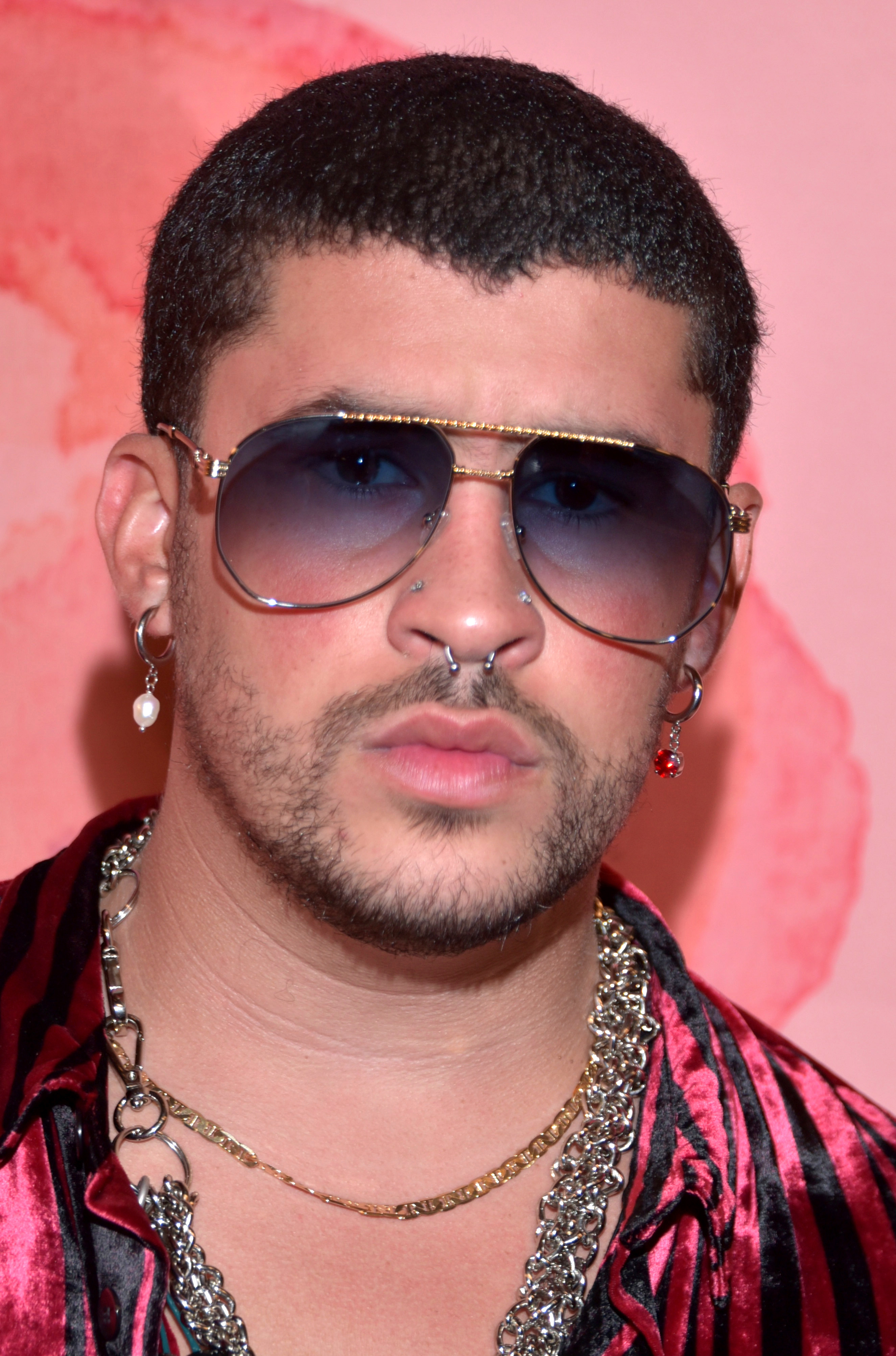
Three-time winner Bad Bunny

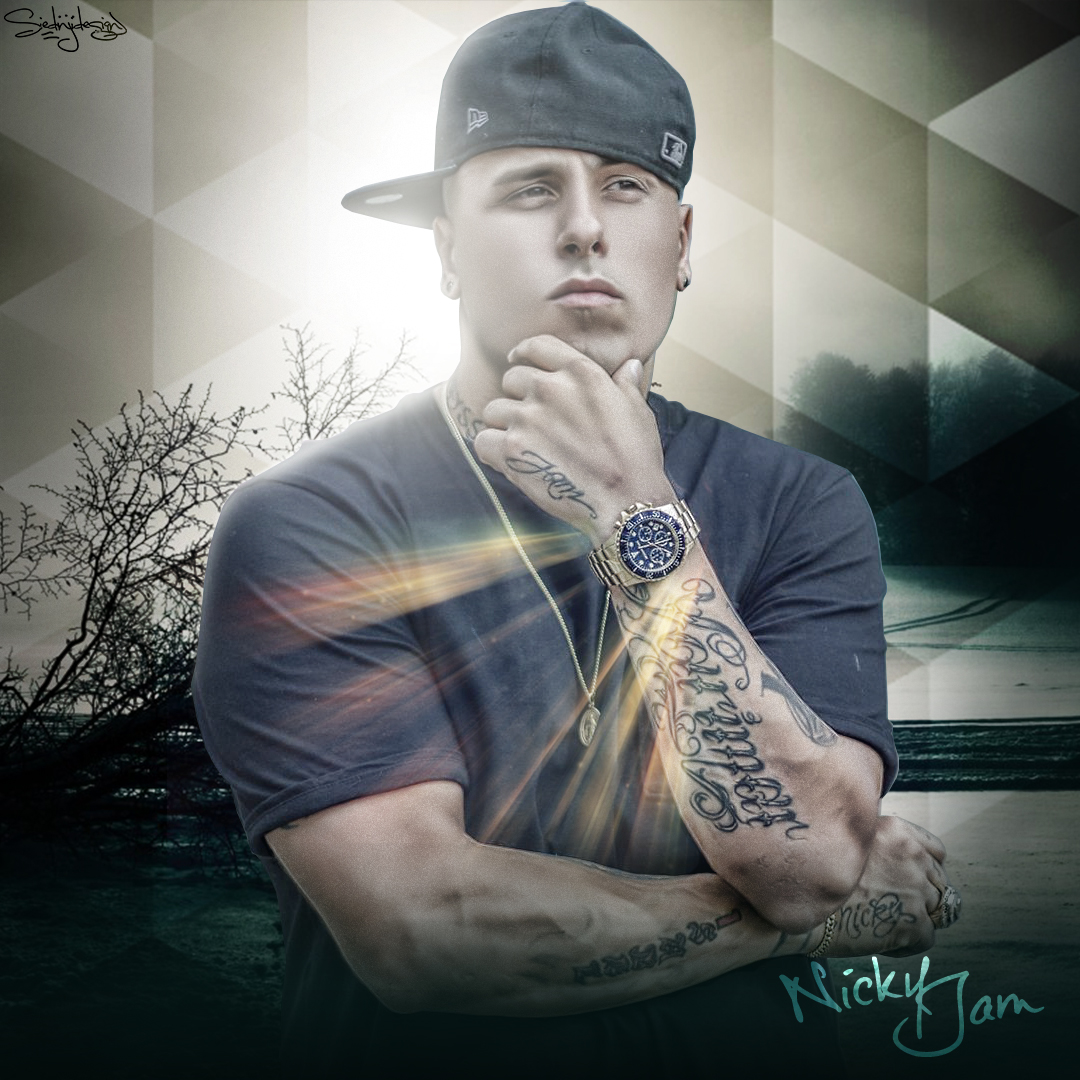
Three-time winner Nicky Jam

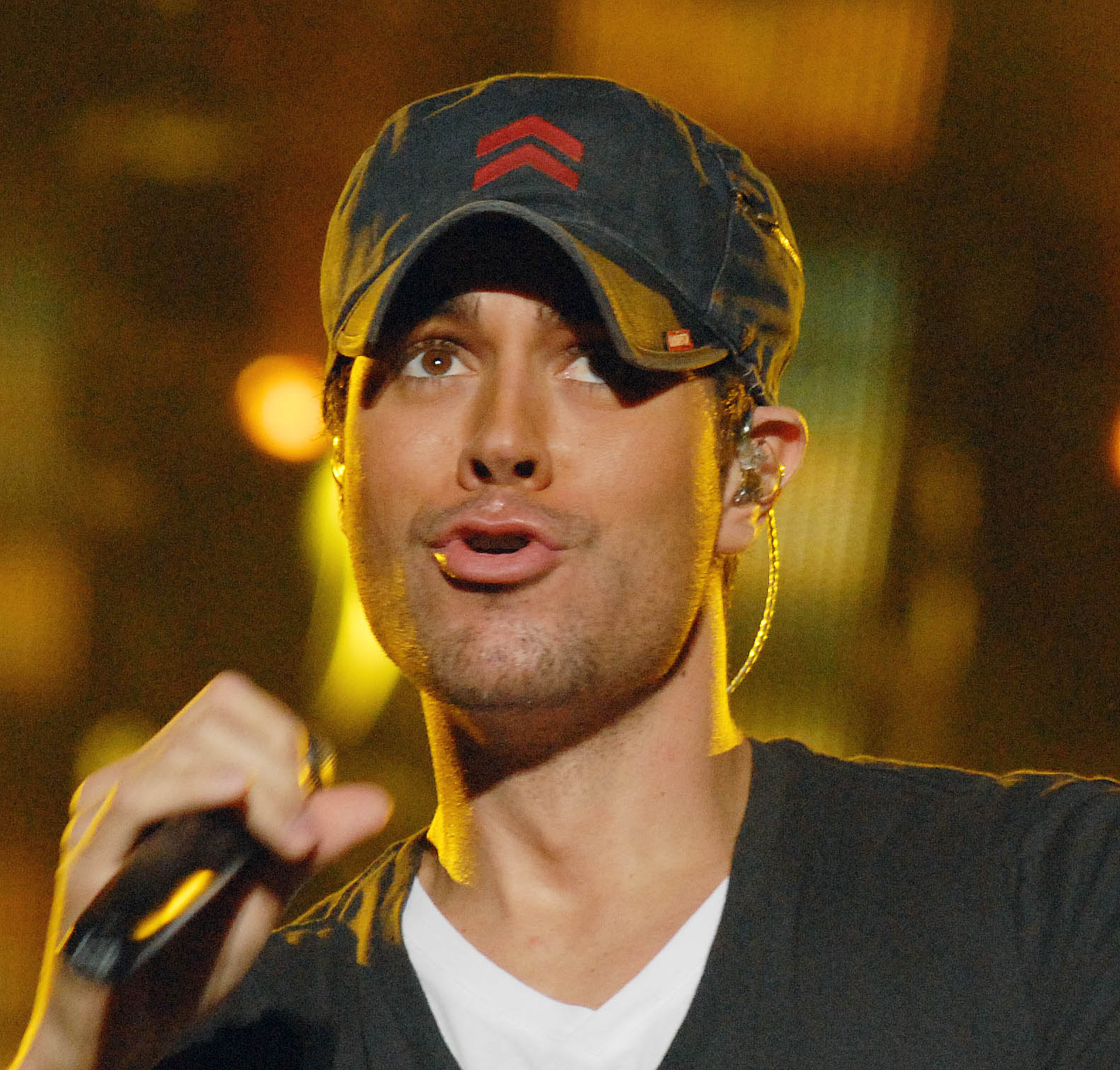
Two-time winner Enrique Iglesias

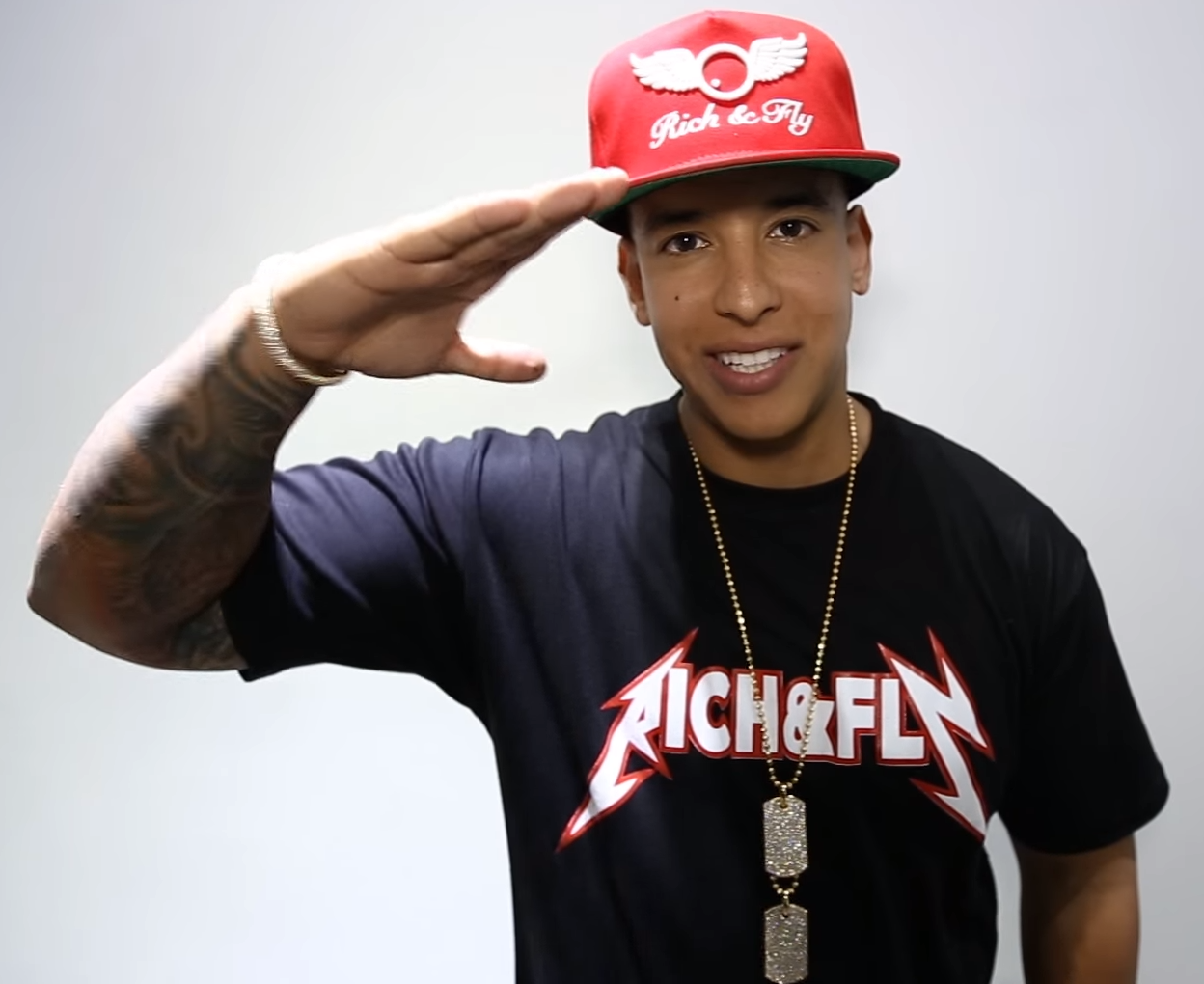
Two-time winner Daddy Yankee

Year	Performing artist(s)	Work	Nominees	Ref.
2013	Don Omar featuring Lucenzo	"Danza Kuduro"	3BallMTY featuring El Bebeto and América Sierra – "Inténtalo"; Romeo Santos featuring Usher – "Promise"; Wisin & Yandel featuring Jennifer Lopez – "Follow the Leader"	
2014	Prince Royce	"Darte Un Beso"	Enrique Iglesias featuring Romeo Santos – "Loco"; Marc Anthony – "Vivir Mi Vida"; Romeo Santos – "Propuesta Indecente"	
2015	Enrique Iglesias featuring Descemer Bueno and Gente de Zona	"Bailando"	Enrique Iglesias featuring Marco Antonio Solís – "El Perdedor"; Romeo Santos – "Eres Mía"; Romeo Santos featuring Drake – "Odio"	
2016	Nicky Jam and Enrique Iglesias	"El Perdón"	Banda Sinaloense MS – "Háblame de Ti"; Banda Sinaloense MS – "Mi Razón de Ser"; J Balvin – "Ay Vamos"	
2017	Nicky Jam	"Hasta El Amanecer"	Daddy Yankee – "Shaky Shaky"; Enrique Iglesias featuring Wisin – "Duele El Corazón"; Los Plebes del Rancho – "Te Metiste"	
2018	Luis Fonsi and Daddy Yankee featuring Justin Bieber	"Despacito"	J Balvin and Willy William featuring Beyoncé – "Mi Gente"; Maluma – "Felices Los 4"; Shakira featuring Maluma – "Chantaje"	
2019	Casper Mágico, Nio García, Darell, Nicky Jam, Ozuna, and Bad Bunny	"Te Boté"	Daddy Yankee – "Dura"; Nicky Jam and J Balvin – "X"; Ozuna and Romeo Santos – "El Farsante"	
2020	Daddy Yankee	"Con Calma" (featuring Snow)	Anuel AA & Romeo Santos - "Ella Quiere Beber"; Pedro Capó & Farruko - "Calma (Remix)"; Sech, Ozuna & Anuel AA featuring Darell & Nicky Jam - "Otro Trago (Remix)"	
2021	Bad Bunny & Jhayco	"Dakiti"	Bad Bunny - "Yo Perreo Sola"; Bad Bunny - "Vete"; Bad Bunny, Jowell & Randy & Ñengo Flow - "Safaera"; Maluma & The Weeknd - "Hawái (Remix)"	
2022	No award			
2023	Eslabon Armado & Peso Pluma	"Ella Baila Sola"	Fuerza Regida & Grupo Frontera - "Bebe Dame"; Grupo Frontera & Bad Bunny - "Un x100to"; Peso Pluma & Natanael Cano - "PRC"; Yng Lvcas & Peso Pluma - "La Bebe (Remix)"	
2024	Karol G & Peso Pluma	"Qlona"	Bad Bunny & Feid - "Perro Negro"; Calle 24, Chino Pacas & Fuerza Regida - "Qué Onda"; Peso Pluma, Gabito Ballesteros & Junior H – "Lady Gaga"; Xavi – "La Diabla"	
2025	Bad Bunny	"DTMF"	Bad Bunny - "Baile Inolvidable"; Bad Bunny - "Nuevayol"; Karol G - "Si Antes Te Hubiera Conocido"; Óscar Maydon & Fuerza Regida - "Tu Boda"	

== Records ==
=== Most nominations ===
Nominations	Act
10	Bad Bunny
7	Romeo Santos
5	Peso Pluma
5	Enrique Iglesias
5	Nicky Jam
4	Daddy Yankee
3	J Balvin
3	Maluma
3	Ozuna
2	Fuerza Regida
2	Banda Sinaloense MS
2	Darell
2	Anuel AA
2	Grupo Frontera

=== Most awards ===
Awards	Act
3	Bad Bunny
3	Nicky Jam
2	Peso Pluma
2	Enrique Iglesias
2	Daddy Yankee
