= La People =

Song by Peso Pluma and Tito Double P

from the album Génesis
- Language: Spanish
- Released: 22 June 2023
- Genre: Regional Mexican
- Length: 2:33
- Label: Double P
- Songwriters: Jesús Camacho; Jesús Roberto Laija García; Joel Portillo; Netón Vega
- Producers: Tito Double P; George Prajin

Lyric video
- "La People" on YouTube

"La People" is a song by Mexican singer-songwriter and rapper Peso Pluma and fellow singer-songwriter and rapper Tito Double P. It was released on 22 June 2023 as the eleventh track on the former's third studio album Génesis and the thirteenth track on its deluxe edition, released through Double P Records. "La People" was written and produced by the latter, with Jesús Camacho, Joel Portillo and Netón Vega co-writing it, and George Prajin co-producing it.

== Background and lyrics ==
In June 2023, Peso Pluma announced the release date of his third studio album Génesis and revealed its official tracklist, where "La People" with Tito Double P was featured as its eleventh track. By release of the song, and its parent album, rumors of Peso Pluma having connections with the Sinaloa Cartel were spreading online due to the lyrics used on "La People".

Lyrically, the song mentions El Nini, known alias of Néstor Isidro Pérez Salas, throughout his years as part of the Sinaloa Cartel and his escape from prison in January 2023. Following the arrest of El Nini in November 2023, "La People" went viral on social platforms, including TikTok.

== Charts ==
Weekly chart performance for "La People"
Chart (2023)	Peak position
Global 200 (Billboard)	164
Mexico (Billboard)	12
US Bubbling Under Hot 100 (Billboard)	6
US Hot Latin Songs (Billboard)	12

== Certifications ==
Certifications for "La People"
Region	Certification	Certified units/sales
Mexico (AMPROFON)	Diamond+3× Platinum+Gold	1,190,000^{‡}
United States (RIAA)	23× Platinum (Latin)	1,380,000^{‡}
^{‡} Sales+streaming figures based on certification alone.
