= La Bebé =

2021 single by Yng Lvcas

Single by Yng Lvcas

from the album LPM
- Language: Spanish
- English title: "The Baby"
- Released: December 24, 2021
- Genre: Reggaeton
- Length: 3:43
- Label: We Are Bosses Records; Warner Music
- Songwriters: Daniel Oswaldo Donlucas Martínez; Héctor Adrián Salazar Aguayo
- Producer: Bounce Bosses

Yng Lvcas singles chronology
"GaD #22" (2021)	"La Bebé" (2021)	"X.O" (2022)

Music video
- "La Bebé" on YouTube

"La Bebé" (transl. "The Baby") is a song by Mexican singer Yng Lvcas, released as first single from his second mixtape LPM on 24 December 2021, same day of the release of the mixtape. The song was written by Yng Lvcas and Héctor Adrián Salazar Aguayo and produced by Bounce Bosses. The single and mixtape were released through the independent label We Are Bosses Records, before he signed with Warner Music and his musical catalog became promoted by this company. The song was going to be part of his previous album Wup? Mixtape 1 (2021), an album of corridos but since it was a reggaeton song he decided not to add it.

In late 2022, the song went viral on the short video platform TikTok, which caused an increase in streaming on platforms and managed to debut on the Billboard Hot 100 list in the United States at number 77. As of November 2022, it has accumulated 20 million streams across all digital platforms, including 12 million views on Spotify. In April 2023, the song was listed in the top 10 radio in countries such as Ecuador, Paraguay, Peru and Central America, as well as in the top 3 in Mexico.

== Music video ==
A music video was released on the same day as the premiere of both the LPM mixtape and the release of the song as a single, it was published through the singer's official YouTube channel, who also edited and directed the video clip. The protagonist of the video is the model Andrea Camargo, filming the entire video in a single day. In 2023, Lvcas admitted that the song was not initially one of his favorites, as he preferred to compose and produce corridos, also expressing that when the popularity of the song began, he was ashamed to admit to people that it was his.

== Charts ==
Weekly chart performance for "La Bebé"
Chart (2023)	Peak position
Colombia (BMAT)	7
Costa Rica Urbano (Monitor Latino)	5
Ecuador (BMAT)	9
Italy (FIMI)	66
Mexico (BMAT)	2
Paraguay (BMAT)	3
Peru (BMAT)	2
Switzerland (Schweizer Hitparade)	63

== Certifications ==
Certifications and sales for "La Bebé"
Region	Certification	Certified units/sales
United States (RIAA)	4× Platinum (Latin)	240,000^{‡}
^{‡} Sales+streaming figures based on certification alone.

== Remix version ==
"La Bebé (Remix)"

Single by Yng Lvcas and Peso Pluma

from the EP Six Jewels 23
- Language: Spanish
- English title: "The Baby (Remix)"
- Released: March 17, 2023
- Genre: Reggaeton
- Length: 3:54
- Label: Warner Music
- Songwriters: Daniel Oswaldo Donlucas Martínez; Hassan Emilio Kabande Laija; Héctor Adrián Salazar Aguayo
- Producers: Bounce Bosses; VV Brujo

Yng Lvcas singles chronology
"Esa Nena" (2023)	"La Bebé (Remix)" (2023)	"Perdonémonos" (2023)

Peso Pluma singles chronology
"Ella Baila Sola" (2023)	"La Bebé (Remix)" (2023)	"Chanel" (2023)

Music video
- "La Bebé (Remix)" on YouTube

A remix version was released on March 17, 2023, with Mexican singer and rapper Peso Pluma. A new verse written and performed by him was added to the remix. After the virality of the original song on social networks, the remix was well received by both critics and commercially. The release of the remix happened the same day that Yng signed with the Warner Music Group label. This remix with "Ella Baila Sola" (both songs by Peso Pluma) they were part of a streak of records never seen in Mexican music globally. The song was added to the EP Six Jewels 23 (2023) by Lvcas, released on May 25.

=== Background ===
After both artists ranked first in popularity on YouTube, TikTok and Spotify, Peso Pluma, thanks to a mutual friend, contacted Yng Lvcas to create a new version of the song. Yng Lvcas told Publimetro newspaper: "There has not been anyone who lifts reggaeton to the full and I thought that Peso Pluma would do it incredible and without thinking I said yes and he did excellent, it was the first time I met him, he is an excellent person". Peso Pluma expressed: "I heard the song and I knew that the morro (Yng Lvcas) was Mexican", when he heard it he was traveling to New York City. Before this, the label had proposed to Yng Lvcas that the remix be with Milo Mae, Ñengo Flow and Lenny Tavárez.

=== Critical reception ===
Fabiola Meneses from Los 40 México expressed: "The song is already breaking records" and included it in List 40: From 40 to 1 in the first position for the week of April 8, 2023. The TimeOut México site expressed: "The musical diversity of CDMX is present in this collaboration that lights up the party as long as we are open to new styles". The site El Capitalino after the release named Yng Lvcas as "the leader of the new wave of urban music singers" and said that "at the same time, he seeks to fuse it with touches of Mexican popular culture". Juan Carlos Gamboa of the Bandamax channel expressed: "Peso Pluma is experiencing a breakthrough in his career and is positioned as one of the most beloved performers on digital platforms". Monitor Latino published: "[...] in the company of Peso Pluma the issue takes on another dimension, as the latter has become a global phenomenon".

=== Commercial performance ===
The song debuted on the Billboard Hot 100 chart the week of April 1, 2023 at position 77, marking Yng's first entry and Peso Pluma's fifth on that list. Simultaneously, the song "Ella Baila Sola" by Eslabon Armado and Peso Pluma also debuted, which placed the latter as the first Mexican solo act to debut two songs in the same week, and as it was his fourth and fifth entry respectively, he also managed to be the Mexican with the most entries to the Hot 100 in history (5 entries in total at that time), beating Paulina Rubio (3 entries in total). In its first weeks, the song reached number 3 on Spotify's Global top 50, with approximately 5 million daily streams since its release worldwide. According to the International Federation of the Phonographic Industry (IFPI), the remix was the sixth best-selling global single of 2023, earning 1.45 billion subscription streams equivalents globally.

=== Music video ===
A music video premiered on March 22, 2023, the video was published through the reggaeton player's official YouTube channel, it was directed by Bulldog with a duration of just over 4 minutes. The video was recorded in just two days but in different weeks, the first day of recording was the day after they recorded the song in the studio, and the second day of filming happened a week later. Yng Lvcas told the newspaper Publimetro: "On a Thursday we recorded the song and the next day we recorded the video because Peso Pluma was very busy, there are several takes, the first ones we did that day, which is where we are recording with some balloons like in a studio and the following week, we recorded the shots where the 'girls' are seen, everything was 'on fire' because we had time on our hands". The video added 10 million views in its first week of release and was placed in first place in trends on YouTube Mexico.

=== Live presentations ===
The first time they both performed the song live was on April 9, 2023 at a concert in the city of Ontario, California, United States, this, within the Peso Pluma Doble P Tour at the Toyota Arena. Yng Lvcas was one of the regional Mexican singer's guests that night. After the performance, both received a plaque for 25 million streams of the song on Spotify. Peso Pluma performed the song on January 30, 2025 at Intuit Dome in Inglewood, California for FireAid to help with relief efforts for the January 2025 Southern California wildfires.

=== Charts ===
==== Weekly charts ====
Weekly chart performance for "La Bebé (Remix)"
Chart (2023)	Peak position
Argentina Hot 100 (Billboard)	3
Bolivia (Billboard)	3
Chile (Billboard)	3
Colombia (Billboard)	1
Costa Rica (Monitor Latino)	8
Ecuador (Billboard)	1
Ecuador (Monitor Latino)	4
Global 200 (Billboard)	3
Guatemala (Monitor Latino)	8
Honduras (Monitor Latino)	3
Italy (FIMI)	64
Mexico (Billboard)	1
Nicaragua (Monitor Latino)	1
Paraguay (Monitor Latino)	6
Peru (Billboard)	2
Peru (Monitor Latino)	2
Spain (Billboard)	10
Spain (PROMUSICAE)	14
Switzerland (Schweizer Hitparade)	89
US Billboard Hot 100	11
US Hot Latin Songs (Billboard)	2
Uruguay (CUD)	64

==== Year-end charts ====
2023 year-end chart performance for "La Bebé (Remix)"
Chart (2023)	Position
Global 200 (Billboard)	11
Global Singles (IFPI)	6
US Billboard Hot 100	40
US Hot Latin Songs (Billboard)	2
US Latin Airplay (Billboard)	6
US Latin Rhythm Airplay (Billboard)	3

2024 year-end chart performance for "La Bebé (Remix)"
Chart (2024)	Position
Global 200 (Billboard)	160

=== Certifications ===
Certifications and sales for "La Bebé (Remix)"
Region	Certification	Certified units/sales
Italy (FIMI)	Platinum	100,000^{‡}
Mexico (AMPROFON)	3× Diamond	2,100,000^{‡}
Spain (Promusicae)	3× Platinum	180,000^{‡}
United States (RIAA)	13× Platinum (Latin)	780,000^{‡}
Streaming
Worldwide (IFPI)	—	1,450,000,000
^{‡} Sales+streaming figures based on certification alone.

== See also ==
- List of best-selling Latin singles
