= List of best-selling Latin singles in the United States =

Latin music in the United States is defined by both the Recording Industry Association of America (RIAA) and Billboard magazine as any release with 51% or more of its content recorded in Spanish. Since 2010, Billboard has tracked the best-selling Latin Digital Songs chart on January 23, 2010, which shows the top downloaded Spanish-language song of the week. On October 11, 2012, the methodology for the Hot Latin Songs chart were changed to include sales of digital downloads and streaming activity as well as excluding non predominately Spanish languages from appearing on the chart. As a result, English-language versions of a track sung in Spanish are not factored to the digital sales of a Latin song.

Sales certifications for US singles sales are awarded by the RIAA. The RIAA began awarding certifications in 1958. Certifications are based on unit retail sales: sales of 500,000 were awarded gold, 1,000,000 for platinum and 2,000,000 or more for multi-platinum. Beginning on May 9, 2013, the RIAA updated the methodology for singles to include digital downloads and streaming (with 100 streams counting as one download). Since February 1, 2016, 150 streams are equivalent to one download.

In 2000, the RIAA launched Latin certifications to acknowledge that market in the United States. The thresholds for a Latin certification were — 50,000 for gold, 100,000 for platinum, and 200,000 or more for multi-platinum. "La Bomba" by Azul Azul was the only single to receive a Latin certification based on units sold to retails (it was certified platinum). On December 20, 2013, the RIAA established the Latin Digital Singles Award for Spanish-language digital songs. The threshold for the Latin digital songs are 30,000 for gold, 60,000 platinum, and 120,000 or more for multi-platinum. The Latin Digital Singles Awards uses the same methodology as the Digital Singles Award. The RIAA also awards the Latin digital diamond certification for singles that have been certified at least 10× multi-platinum for sales plus track-equivalent streams of 600,000 units. "Ay Vamos" and "6 AM" by J Balvin are the first Latin singles to receive the Latin digital diamond award.

As of January 2018, the highest-certified Latin single is "Despacito" by Luis Fonsi and Daddy Yankee, and its remix featuring Justin Bieber. With over 13 million units sold, it is the first and only Latin song to receive a digital diamond certification. With 13 platinum certifications, it is the first and only Latin song to be awarded a digital platinum certification more than five times, surpassing "Danza Kuduro" by Don Omar, the first song to reach digital platinum certification one, two, three, four, and five times. It is the first Latin song to receive all Latin digital diamond certifications from 3 to 14 certifications, surpassing "Propuesta Indecente" by Romeo Santos, the first to receive two, and "Ay Vamos" and "6 AM" by J Balvin, the first to receive one. It is also the first song to receive all Latin digital platinum certifications from 19 to 141 certifications.

== Best-selling singles ==
This list is based on the latest data featured on the list of certified works with Latin Diamond or 10× Platinum (at least 600,000 certified units) status at RIAA's website. RIAA does not automatically issue certifications, even if sales and streaming numbers meet the criteria. Artists have to apply and pay RIAA to have their works certified and recertified. As such, this list does not include all certifiable Latin works and certified works are not routinely updated. (Note: Spanish or Portuguese-language songs does not need to rank on the US Latin Digital Songs chart to be included on the table.) (Note: In order to be included on the table, singles must have at least a Diamond Latin or 10× Platinum Latin certifications. If not certified, units must surpass 600,000 sales plus track-equivalent streams.)

Key
†	Indicates Latin digital single certification
*	Indicates digital single certification
^	Indicates standard single certification

Best-selling Latin singles in the U.S. (sales plus track-equivalent streams)
Single	Artist(s)	Record label (Note: The record labels, dates, and shipment/digital download values are those given by the RIAA.)	Release date	Chart peaks (Note: The charts are those given by Billboard magazine.)		Multi-platinum certification (Note: Since May 2013, digital certifications are based on digital sales plus track-equivalent streams. From February 2016 onwards, 150 streams are counted as one download.)	Certified units	Certified date	Ref.
Single	Artist(s)	Record label	Release date	US	Latin	Multi-platinum certification	Certified units	Certified date	Ref.
"Despacito (Remix)"	Luis Fonsi; Daddy Yankee; Justin Bieber	Universal Latin; Republic	April 17, 2017	1	1	13× *	13,000,000	January 6, 2020	
"Despacito"	Luis Fonsi; Daddy Yankee	Universal Latin	January 13, 2017	1	1	141× *	8,460,000	August 19, 2024	
"Te Boté (Remix)"	Nio Garcia; Darell; Casper Mágico; Bad Bunny; Nicky Jam; Ozuna	Flow La Movie Inc.	April 13, 2018	36	1	106× †	6,360,000	May 21, 2025	
"No Me Conoce"	Jhayco; Bad Bunny; J Balvin	Universal Latin	August 15, 2010	71	4	90× *	5,400,000	April 3, 2024	
"Danza Kuduro"	Don Omar; Lucenzo	Machete	February 22, 2019	82	1	5× *	5,000,000	May 9, 2013	
"Mi Gente"	J Balvin; Willy William; Beyoncé	Universal Latin	June 30, 2017	3	1	68× †	4,080,000	October 29, 2018	
"Macarena"	Los del Río	RCA	August 11, 1995	1	12	4× ^	4,000,000	October 14, 1996	
"Bailando"	Enrique Iglesias; Descemer Bueno; Gente de Zona; Sean Paul	Republic	March 18, 2014	12	1	4× *	4,000,000	September 19, 2017	
"Taki Taki"	DJ Snake; Selena Gomez; Ozuna; Cardi B	Geffen	September 28, 2018	11	1	4× *	4,000,000	December 2, 2020	
"Propuesta Indecente"	Romeo Santos	Sony Latin	July 30, 2013	79	1	65× †	3,900,000	January 16, 2024	
"Oye Mujer"	Raymix	Universal Latin	June 30, 2017	–	7	53× *	3,180,000	October 29, 2025	
"Pepas"	Farruko	Universal Latin	June 24, 2021	–	7	52× *	3,120,000	February 28, 2023	
"Mia"	Bad Bunny; Drake	OVO; Rimas; Warner Bros.	October 11, 2018	5	1	50× †	3,000,000	November 19, 2021	
"Gata Only"	FloyyMenor, Cris MJ	UnitedMasters	February 27, 2024	27	1	3× *	3,000,000	June 26, 2025	
"Amanece"	Anuel AA; Haze	House of Haze; Cinq Music Group	December 14, 2018	–	11	47× *	2,820,000	December 5, 2025	
"Mayores"	Becky G; Bad Bunny	Sony Latin	July 14, 2017	74	3	46× †	2,760,000	September 4, 2021	
"Solita"	DJ Luian; Mambo Kingz; Ozuna; Bad Bunny; Wisin; Almighty	Hear This Music; Rimas	January 19, 2018	–	3	47× *	2,640,000	October 10, 2024	
"Felices Los 4"	Maluma	Sony Latin	April 21, 2017	48	2	44× †	2,640,000	September 4, 2021	
"La Bicicleta"	Carlos Vives; Shakira	Sony Latin	May 27, 2016	95	2	43× †	2,580,000	June 9, 2025	
"Dura"	Daddy Yankee	El Cartel	January 18, 2018	43	2	43× †	2,580,000	August 6, 2020	
"El Azul"	Junior H; Peso Pluma	Warner Latina	February 10, 2023	55	8	42× †	2,520,000	October 1, 2025	
"Con Calma"	Daddy Yankee; Snow	El Cartel	January 24, 2019	22	1	41× †	2,460,000	August 6, 2020	
"Eres Mía"	Romeo Santos	Sony Latin	February 25, 2014	–	2	39× †	2,340,000	August 31, 2022	
"Sin Pijama"	Becky G; Natti Natasha	Sony Latin	April 20, 2018	70	4	38× †	2,280,000	April 16, 2021	
"TQM"	Fuerza Regida	Sony Latin	May 19, 2023	34	5	37× †	2,220,000	November 6, 2024	
"Sabor Fresa"	Fuerza Regida	Sony Latin	June 22, 2023	26	3	37× †	2,220,000	November 6, 2024	
"X"	Nicky Jam; J Balvin	Sony Latin	March 2, 2018	41	1	35× †	2,100,000	March 25, 2019	
"Promise"	Romeo Santos; Usher	Sony Latin	September 6, 2011	83	1	34× †	2,040,000	August 31, 2022	
"Odio"	Romeo Santos; Drake	Sony Latin	January 28, 2014	45	1	34× †	2,040,000	August 31, 2022	
"El Gordo Trae el Mando"	Chino Pacas	Street Mob	October 14, 2024	58	11	34× †	2,040,000	October 14, 2024	
"La Tortura"	Shakira; Alejandro Sanz	Epic	May 20, 2005	23	1	32× †	1,920,000	March 8, 2018	
"Que Vuelvas"	Carín León; Grupo Frontera	Sony Latin	September 29, 2023	50	3	28× †	1,680,000	September 29, 2023	
"El Perdón"	Nicky Jam; Enrique Iglesias	Sony Latin	February 5, 2015	56	1	27× †	1,620,000	September 18, 2017	
"Harley Quinn"	Fuerza Regida; Marshmello	Sony Latin	December 15, 2023	40	2	27× †	1,620,000	November 6, 2024	
"Calma (Remix)"	Pedro Capó; Farruko	Sony Latin	October 5, 2018	71	3	25× †	1,500,000	September 19, 2019	
"Shaky Shaky"	Daddy Yankee	El Cartel; Universal Latin	April 8, 2016	88	1	23× †	1,680,000	August 6, 2020	
"Hasta El Amanecer"	Nicky Jam	Sony Latin	January 15, 2016	73	1	22× †	1,320,000	September 18, 2017	
"El Hijo Mayor"	Junior H	Warner Latina	October 8, 2024	—	41	22× †	1,320,000	October 22, 2025	
"Adiós Amor"	Christian Nodal	Universal Latin	January 13, 2017	– (Note: "Adiós Amor" did not chart on the Billboard Hot 100, though did peak at number five on the Bubbling Under Hot 100 Singles chart.)	4	21× †	1,260,000	May 22, 2018	
"Me Niego"	Reik; Ozuna; Wisin	Sony Latin	February 16, 2018	77	6	21× †	1,260,000	June 24, 2020	
"Ella Baila Sola"	Eslabon Armado; Peso Pluma	DEL	March 17, 2023	4	1	21× †	1,260,000	July 12, 2023	
"Los Botones Azules"	Junior H; Luis R. Conriquez	Warner Latina	October 8, 2024	—	20	21× †	1,260,000	October 8, 2024	
"Se Amerita"	Junior H	Warner Latina	October 8, 2024	—	—	19× †	1,140,000	October 8, 2024	
"Y Lloro"	Junior H	Warner Latina	October 8, 2024	79	10	19× †	1,140,000	October 8, 2024	
"El Tsurito"	Junior H; Gabito Ballesteros; Peso Pluma	Warner Latina	October 8, 2024	— (Note: "El Tsurito" did not chart on the Billboard Hot 100, though did peak at number six on the Bubbling Under Hot 100 Singles chart.)	23	17× †	1,020,000	October 22, 2025	
"Vivir Mi Vida"	Marc Anthony	Sony Latin	April 30, 2013	92	1	16× †	960,000	December 18, 2015	
"Chantaje"	Shakira; Maluma	Sony Latin	October 28, 2016	51	1	16× †	960,000	May 19, 2017	
"Krippy Kush"	Farruko; Rvssian; Bad Bunny; Nicki Minaj; 21 Savage	Sony Latin	July 31, 2017	75	5	16× †	960,000	April 16, 2018	
"La Mordidita"	Ricky Martin; Yotuel	Sony Latin	April 21, 2015	–	6	15× †	900,000	August 26, 2021	
"Chanel"	Becky G; Peso Pluma	Kemosabe	March 30, 2023	55	8	15× †	900,000	September 22, 2023	
"Encantadora"	Yandel	Sony Latin	October 2, 2015	–	3	14× †	840,000	May 12, 2021	
"No Me Acuerdo"	Thalía; Natti Natasha	Sony Latin	June 1, 2018	–	14	14× †	840,000	September 4, 2021	
"Vamos Para Arriba"	Junior H; Gabito Ballesteros	Warner Latina	October 8, 2024	—	32	14× †	840,000	October 22, 2025	
"Síguelo Bailando"	Ozuna	Sony Latin	November 10, 2017	–	16	13× †	780,000	September 6, 2018	
"El Amante"	Nicky Jam	Sony Latin	January 20, 2017	92	2	13× †	780,000	September 18, 2017	
"La Bebé (Remix)"	Yng Lvcas; Peso Pluma	Warner	March 17, 2023	11	2	13× †	780,000	July 7, 2023	
"Duele El Corazón"	Enrique Iglesias; Wisin	Sony Latin	March 17, 2016	82	1	12× †	720,000	May 18, 2017	
"La Gozadera"	Gente de Zona; Marc Anthony	Sony Latin	May 4, 2015	– (Note: "La Gozadera" did not chart on the Billboard Hot 100, though did peak at number 12 on the Bubbling Under Hot 100 Singles chart.)	2	12× †	720,000	March 30, 2017	
"Corazón"	Maluma; Nego do Borel	Sony Latin	November 3, 2017	87	5	11× †	660,000	April 20, 2018	
"6 AM"	J Balvin; Farruko	Capitol Latin	December 3, 2013	–	5	10× †	600,000	October 19, 2015	
"Ay Vamos"	J Balvin	Capitol Latin	September 16, 2014	– (Note: "Ay Vamos" did not chart on the Billboard Hot 100, though did peak at number 11 on the Bubbling Under Hot 100 Singles chart.)	1	10× †	600,000	October 19, 2015	
"Ginza"	J Balvin	Capitol Latin	July 17, 2015	84	1	10× †	600,000	June 22, 2016	
"Báilame"	Nacho	Universal Latin	April 14, 2017	– (Note: "Báilame" did not chart on the Billboard Hot 100, though did peak at number eight on the Bubbling Under Hot 100 Singles chart.)	5	10× †	600,000	March 1, 2018	
"Fiebre"	Ricky Martin; Wisin & Yandel	Sony Latin	February 23, 2018	–	17	10× †	600,000	June 6, 2018	
"Ahora Me Llama"	Karol G; Bad Bunny	Universal Latin	May 26, 2017	–	10	10× †	600,000	March 1, 2018	
"Ando Enfocado"	Jaziel Avilez; Codiciado; Peso Pluma	Virgin Latin	November 18, 2022	–	33	10× †	600,000	May 8, 2024	
"Qué Onda"	Calle 24; Chino Pacas; Fuerza Regida	Street Mob	August 30, 2023	61	8	10× †	600,000	March 13, 2024	
"Rockstar"	Junior H	Warner Latina	October 8, 2024	— (Note: "Rockstar" did not chart on the Billboard Hot 100, though did peak at number 11 on the Bubbling Under Hot 100 Singles chart.)	26	10× †	600,000	October 8, 2024	

=== English-language songs by Latin artists with Spanish versions ===
Since Billboard and the RIAA only provide overall sales of a song without separating Spanish-language versions of a track sung in English, some Spanish versions' sales are incalculable. Counting both versions, "Hips Don't Lie" by Shakira featuring Wyclef Jean sold 3,553,000 copies, "She Wolf" by Shakira sold 1,812,000 as of March 2014, "Waka Waka (This Time for Africa)" by Shakira featuring Freshlyground sold 1,763,000 as of March 2014, and "Livin' La Vida Loca" by Ricky Martin sold 1,100,000 physical copies as of 1999 and 502,000 digital units as of 2011.

=== Spanglish songs performed mainly in English ===
Since Billboard and Nielsen SoundScan are inconsistent with the definition of Latin music (Billboard states that the US Latin Digital Songs chart only ranks Spanish-language songs but the English-language song "Conga" was ranked on the 2016 US Latin Digital Songs year-end chart), some Spanglish songs primarily sung in English were excluded from the table above. Following that, "I Know You Want Me (Calle Ocho)" by Pitbull sold over two million digital units as of November 2009 and "Bailamos" by Enrique Iglesias sold 700,000 physical copies as of 1999.

== Best-selling single by year ==
This is a list of the best-selling Latin digital songs in the United States since 2010.

- 2010: "Dile al Amor" by Aventura and "Mi Niña Bonita" by Chino & Nacho – 100,000+
- 2011: "Danza Kuduro" by Don Omar featuring Lucenzo
- 2012: "Danza Kuduro" by Don Omar featuring Lucenzo – 542,000
- 2013: "Danza Kuduro" by Don Omar featuring Lucenzo – 230,000 (as of June 30, 2013)
- 2014: "Bailando" by Enrique Iglesias featuring Descemer Bueno and Gente de Zona – 221,000 (as of June 29, 2014)
- 2015: "Bailando" by Enrique Iglesias featuring Descemer Bueno and Gente de Zona
- 2016: "Hasta El Amanecer" by Nicky Jam – 202,000
- 2017: "Despacito" by Luis Fonsi featuring Daddy Yankee, or Luis Fonsi and Daddy Yankee featuring Justin Bieber – 2,692,000

== See also ==
- List of best-selling singles in the United States
- List of best-selling Latin albums in the United States
