= The GB =

Studio album by Gabito Ballesteros
- Released: May 23, 2024
- Genres: Regional Mexican; Corridos tumbados
- Length: 61:28
- Language: Spanish
- Label: Los CT Records
- Producers: Gabito Ballesteros; El Chachito; Joel Nuñez; Miguel Armenta; Said Norzagaray; L. Prince; Daniel Candia; Marcelo Rivera Levy; Carlos Cortes; Natanael Cano

Gabito Ballesteros chronology
SS23 (2023)	The GB (2024)

Singles from The GB
- 1. "Lou Lou" Released: October 21, 2023; 2. "A Puro Dolor" Released: December 2, 2023; 3. "El Boss" Released: March 28, 2024; 4. "Sin Yolanda" Released: May 23, 2024; 5. "Rococo" Released: June 27, 2024

The GB is the debut solo studio album by Mexican singer Gabito Ballesteros. It was released on May 23, 2024, through Los CT Records under Interscope Records. It contains numerous guest appearances from Natanael Cano, Peso Pluma, Óscar Maydon, Kenia Os, Junior H, Luis R Conriquez, Tito Double P, Chino Pacas, Domelipa, Fuerza Regida, Blessd, Adriel Favela and Said Norzagaray. To promote the album, Gabito Ballesteros embarked on his first U.S. tour, the Gabito Ballesteros: The GB Tour in 2024.

== Commercial performance ==
Gabito Ballesteros made his debut on the Billboard 200 albums chart the week of June 8, 2024 at No. 65. The album spent three weeks on the chart.

== Track listing ==
All tracks are written by Gabriel Ballesteros Abril, except where noted.

The GB track listing
No.	Title	Writer(s)	Producer(s)	Length
1.	"Sad Loqueron"	Gabriel Ballesteros; Jorge Jimenez Sanchez	Ballesteros	3:01
2.	"Lucky Charms" (with Natanael Cano & Peso Pluma)	Ballesteros; Daniel Candia; Alan Lopez	Ballesteros	2:50
3.	"Rococo" (with Óscar Maydon)	Ballesteros; Alexis Armando Fierro Roman; Candia; Miguel Armenta	Ballesteros; El Chachito; Joel Nuñez	2:29
4.	"La Niña" (with Kenia Os)	Ballesteros	Ballesteros	2:35
5.	"A Puro Dolor"	Omar Alfanno	Ballesteros; Armenta; Said Norzagaray; L. Prince	2:48
6.	"Fly Club"	Candia; Ballesteros	Ballesteros	2:31
7.	"Neta" (with Junior H)	Ballesteros; Filberto Diaz	Ballesteros	2:59
8.	"Cuento de Hadas"	Ballesteros; Candia	Ballesteros; Candia	3:33
9.	"Mi Segunda Vida"	Fernando Camacho Tirado; Horacio Palencia; Claudia Brant	Ballesteros	3:17
10.	"Sin Yolanda" (with Peso Pluma)	Ballesteros; Candia	Ballesteros; Candia; L. Prince; Marcelo Rivera Levy	3:10
11.	"Belikon" (with Luis R Conriquez & Tito Double P)	Ballesteros; Candia	Ballesteros	2:33
12.	"El Boss" (with Natanael Cano)	Nathanahel Cano Monge; Ballesteros; Candia	Ballesteros	3:45
13.	"Fancys"	Ballesteros; Candia	Ballesteros; Carlos Cortes; L. Prince	3:22
14.	"Bichi" (with Chino Pacas)	Ballesteros	Ballesteros	2:37
15.	"Me Voy"	Julieta Venegas	Ballesteros	2:36
16.	"Dolido" (with Domelipa)	Ballesteros; Candia	Ballesteros	2:55
17.	"Sonrisa Colgate" (with Fuerza Regida)	Ballesteros; Candia	Ballesteros	3:25
18.	"Balenciaga Rose" (with Blessd)	Ballesteros; Candia	Ballesteros	2:25
19.	"Mocoso" (with Said Norzagaray)	Ballesteros; Candia	Ballesteros	2:55
20.	"Ando En Lo Malo" (with Adriel Favela)	Adriel Favela; Josse Francisco Rios; Ballesteros; Luis Lara Ayala	Ballesteros	3:18
21.	"Perfecta"	Alejandro Gustavo Sergi Galante	Ballesteros	3:56
22.	"Lou Lou" (with Natanael Cano)	Candia; Ballesteros; Cano	Ballesteros; Cano	3:08
Total length:				61:28

== Charts ==
Weekly chart performance for The GB
Chart (2024)	Peak position
US Billboard 200	65
