= Nata Montana =

2023 album by Natanael Cano

Studio album by Natanael Cano
- Released: 30 June 2023
- Genre: Regional Mexican; corridos tumbados; urban sierreño
- Length: 44:43
- Language: Spanish
- Label: Rancho Humilde; Warner Music Latina; Los CT
- Producer: Abelardo Rivera; Andres Farias; Jimmy Humilde; Roberto "Tito" Lajia Garcia; Natanael Cano

Natanael Cano chronology
NataKong (2022)	Nata Montana (2023)

Singles from Nata Montana
- 1. "AMG" Released: 24 November 2022; 2. "Como Es Arriba Es Abajo" Released: 28 March 2023; 3. "Pacas de Billetes" Released: 1 May 2023

Nata Montana (Mountain Cream) is the seventh solo studio album by Mexican rapper and singer Natanael Cano, released on 30 June 2023, through Rancho Humilde, Warner Music Latina and Los CT. It features guest appearances by Tito Torbellino Jr, Hernan Trejo, Amilkar Galaviz, Peso Pluma, Luis R. Conriquez, Junior H, Chino Pacas, Gabito Ballesteros, and Dan Sánchez.

== Background and release ==
In November 2022, Cano would release the single "AMG" with Peso Pluma and Gabito Ballesteros, which got all three artists their debuts on the BIllboard Hot 100, debuting at number 92 and later peaking at number 40. He would announce in the beginning of June 2023 that he would be release a new album and previewed the artwork; it closely makes a reference to fictional character Tony Montana from the 1983 film Scarface.

Cano was disappointed upon the release of Nata Montana. Its now-removed first track "Cuerno Azulado" with Gabito Ballesteros was shown as unable to play and was part of a controversy. Also, "Viejo Lobo" with Luis R. Conriquez was released without Conriquez's verse and the album was titled Nata Montaña.

== Commercial performance ==
Nata Montana debuted on the top 5 on the US Billboard Top Latin Albums and US Regional Mexican Albums charts, with 20 thousand album-equivalent units. It also debuted at number 35 on the Billboard 200, making it his second album to appear on the chart, after his second studio album Corridos Tumbados (2019).

== Track listing ==
Prior to the removal of "Cuerno Azulado", which was visible on streaming platforms but unable to be played, it served as the first track out of the 16 tracks off the album. It would be reduced to 15 tracks after the track's removal a few days later.

All tracks are written by Natanael Cano, except where noted.

Nata Montana track listing
No.	Title	Writer(s)	Producer(s)	Length
1.	"Diran de Mi" (with Tito Torbellino Jr)	Natanael Ruben Cano Monge; Iacob Raul Sanchez Zamorano	Abelardo Rivera; Jimmy Humilde; Natanael Cano	2:41
2.	"Mas Altas Que Bajadas"	N. Cano; Hernan Trejo	A. Rivera; Andres Farias; J. Humilde; N. Cano	3:13
3.	"La Lokerona" (with Hernan Trejo)	N. Cano; H. Trejo	A. Rivera; J. Humilde; N. Cano	3:14
4.	"Un Convoy" (with Amilkar Galaviz)	N. Cano; Amilkar Ezequiel Lugo Galaviz	A. Rivera; J. Humilde; N. Cano	2:38
5.	"Pancake" (with Peso Pluma)		A. Rivera; A. Farias; J. Humilde; N. Cano	3:03
6.	"Viejo Lobo" (with Luis R. Conriquez)		A. Rivera; J. Humilde; N. Cano	2:50
7.	"AFS"		A. Rivera; J. Humilde; N. Cano	4:03
8.	"Eres" (with Junior H)	N. Cano; Bryan Leyva Quintana	A. Rivera; A. Farias; J. Humilde; N. Cano	2:52
9.	"Mi Bello Ángel"	América Sierra	A. Rivera; A. Farias; J. Humilde; N. Cano	3:09
10.	"En Corto" (with Chino Pacas)	N. Cano; Cristian Humberto Ávila Vega	A. Rivera; A. Farias; J. Humilde; N. Cano	3:02
11.	"AMG" (with Peso Pluma and Gabito Ballesteros)	N. Cano; Roberto Lajia García	Tito Double P	2:55
12.	"Como Es Arriba Es Abajo" (with Dan Sánchez)	N. Cano; Martin Daniel Sánchez López	A. Rivera; J. Humilde; N. Cano	2:45
13.	"Pacas de Billetes"	N. Cano; Francisco Alejandro Garcia Meza	A. Rivera; J. Humilde; N. Cano	3:08
14.	"Dando y Dando"	N. Cano; Alejandro Buelna	A. Rivera; A. Farias; J. Humilde; N. Cano	2:34
15.	"Ghini"	N. Cano; F. Garcia	A. Rivera; A. Farias; J. Humilde; N. Cano	2:36
Total length:				44:43

== Charts ==
Weekly chart performance for Nata Montana
Chart (2023)	Peak position
US Billboard 200	35
US Regional Mexican Albums (Billboard)	2
US Top Latin Albums (Billboard)	5

== Certifications ==
Certifications for Nata Montana
Region	Certification	Certified units/sales
United States (RIAA)	11× Platinum (Latin)	660,000^{‡}
^{‡} Sales+streaming figures based on certification alone.
