= Corridos Bélicos, Vol. IV =

- Standard edition cover. The artwork was made by So Hood GFX.

Studio album by Luis R. Conriquez
- Released: 4 January 2024 (Standard edition) 29 February 2024 (Deluxe edition)
- Genre: Regional Mexican; corridos bélicos
- Length: 65:41
- Label: Kartel Music
- Producer: Carlos Santos; Luis R. Conriquez; Ernesto Fernández

Luis R. Conriquez chronology
Corridos Bélicos, Vol. 3 (2022)	Corridos Bélicos, Vol. IV (2024)

Singles from Corridos Bélicos, Vol. IV
- 1. "La Belikiza" Released: 21 July 2023; 2. "Nemesio" Released: 4 August 2023; 3. "Sin Tanto Royo" Released: 20 October 2023

Corridos Bélicos, Vol. IV is a studio album by Mexican singer Luis R. Conriquez, released on January 4, 2024, through Kartel Music. It is the fourth album in the singer's series of Corridos Bélicos albums. Its deluxe edition was released on February 29, 2024.

Alluding to its title, the album's tracks are mainly corridos bélicos, different from corridos tumbados. It contains duets with other regional Mexican artists who specialize in Sinaloan music; Los Novillos de la Sierra, Peso Pluma, Gabito Ballesteros, Junior H, El Fantasma, Gerardo Ortíz, Lenin Ramírez, Los Dareyes de la Sierra, Tito Double P, Alfredo Olivas, Joel de la P, Tony Aguirre, Said Norzagaray, Fuerza Regida, Grupo Maximo Grado, Edén Muñoz, Julián Mercado, Nivel C, and Natanael Cano. Also included in the album is a duet with Latin urban artist Ryan Castro. Its deluxe edition features collaborations with Grupo Firme, Panter Bélico, Jasiel Núñez, Enigma Norteño, Marca Registrada, Miguel Cornejo, and El Rabbanito.

== Background ==
After releasing multiple singles in 2023, the official release date for Corridos Bélicos, Vol. IV had been announced by Conriquez on December 24, 2023, revealing that it was scheduled to be released on January 4, 2024, through Kartel Music. On December 27, 2023, the singer revealed the official tracklist for the album, with a different artist or group in each track, with only one solo track. Artists such as Peso Pluma, Gabito Ballesteros, Junior H, Ryan Castro, Fuerza Regida, and Natanael Cano appeared in the tracklist.

Conriquez told Rolling Stone about working with the artists:

I'm grateful that so many of my talented colleagues agreed to collaborate with me on this album. I'm blessed to call all of them my friends and it's been exciting to grow this genre together and to continue showing the world what Mexico has to offer.

A deluxe edition of the album had also been teased, adding five additional tracks. Fans of Conriquez had also wondered why Eduin Cázares from Grupo Firme and Panter Bélico appeared on the cover art but were not included on any of the album's tracks. The eight additional tracks that make up the album's deluxe version were released on February 29, 2024.

== Music ==
Corridos Bélicos. Vol. IV, alluding to the title, is an album consisting mainly of corridos bélicos ("war ballads" in English), a subgenre that is slightly different from corridos tumbados and was pioneered by Luis R. Conriquez. In the subgenre, as well as in the album, the themes in the lyrics usually focus on drug trafficking and a variety of brass instruments and guitars are used; trombones and tenor horns are commonly used. The album also contains banda music in some tracks.

The second track, "Pixelados" with Peso Pluma, talks about a war and protecting themselves with grenade launchers and M4 rifles; the song title could be a reference to Peso Pluma's 2020 song "Los Pixelados". The album also includes a duet version of Natanael Cano's cover of "Mi Bello Angel" (originally recorded by Los Primos MX) as its final track, which was re-recorded. Said track is the only non-corrido song on the album, as it is a romantic ranchera.

== Promotion ==
The album would be promoted on Times Square billboards, advertising the album's availability on Spotify, Pandora, and YouTube. Floyd Mayweather Jr. had also promoted the album on Instagram, adding that he had an announcement that was "coming soon".

=== Singles ===
"La Belikiza" with Lenin Ramírez was released on July 21, 2023, serving as the lead single for Corridos Bélicos, Vol. IV. "Nemesio" with El Fantasma was released on August 4, 2023, though it was re-recorded for the album, and "Sin Tanto Royo" with Tito Double P was released on October 20, 2023, which serve as the second and third singles from the album.

== Track listing ==
Corridos Bélicos, Vol. IV track listing
No.	Title	Writer(s)	Producer(s)	Length
1.	"A Punta de Balazos" (with Los Novillos de la Sierra)	Arnoldo Aboytes	Carlos Santos; Conriquez	3:31
2.	"Pixelados" (with Peso Pluma)	Hassan Emilio Kabande Laija; Kevin Ramírez	C. Santos; Conriquez; Ernesto Fernández	3:55
3.	"El Agujero" (with Gabito Ballesteros)	Jesús Roberto Laija García; Miguel Armenta	C. Santos; Conriquez	2:23
4.	"Aquellos Botones" (with Junior H)	Laija García	C. Santos; Conriquez	3:04
5.	"Nemesio" (with El Fantasma)	Nelson Fernández	C. Santos; Conriquez	2:40
6.	"Arre Pues" (with Gerardo Ortíz)	Laija García	C. Santos; Conriquez	2:17
7.	"Pónganse Bien" (with Ryan Castro)	Bryan David Castro Sosa; Laija García; Santiago Orrego Gallego	C. Santos; Conriquez; Adrian Chachan	2:34
8.	"La Belikiza" (with Lenin Ramírez)	Omar Jaffet Cardenas González		2:09
9.	"Las Dos R" (with Los Dareyes de la Sierra)	Laija García	C. Santos; Conriquez; Fernández; Darey Castro	2:30
10.	"Bélicos" (with Tito Double P)	Luis Roberto Conriquez; Laija García	C. Santos; Conriquez; Fernandez; Tito Double P	2:18
11.	"La Supuesta Cita" (with Alfredo Olivas)	José Alfredo Olivas Rojas	C. Santos; Conriquez; Fernandez; Alfredo Olivas; Saúl Castro	3:05
12.	"Saquen Cuentas" (with Joel de la P)	Ángel Ureta; Joel Portillo	C. Santos; Conriquez	2:54
13.	"19 Por Los Radios" (with Tony Aguirre)	Tony Aguirre	C. Santos; Conriquez	2:44
14.	"Sin Tanto Royo" (with Tito Double P)	Laija García	Tito Double P; Jassiel Ramos; C. Santos; Fernández	2:28
15.	"Gorras Numeradas" (with Said Norzagaray)	Conriquez; Said Norzagaray	C. Santos; Conriquez	2:58
16.	"Por Reynosa"	Conriquez	C. Santos; Conriquez	2:29
17.	"Fresas con Crema" (with Fuerza Regida)	Armenta	C. Santos; Conriquez	2:20
18.	"Quién Es Iván" (with Grupo Maximo Grado)	Christian Michelle Felix Felix	C. Santos; Conriquez; Christan Felix	3:33
19.	"LMV" (with Edén Muñoz)	Edén Muñoz	C. Santos; Conriquez	2:30
20.	"Más Perrón Con los Balenciaga" (with Gabito Ballesteros)	Conriquez; Portillo; Laija García	C. Santos; Conriquez	2:49
21.	"El Ocho" (with Julián Mercado)	Fausto Cruz	Julián Mercado; C. Santos	3:15
22.	"El 27" (with Nivel C)	Julio César Avita Audelo	C. Santos; Conriquez	3:53
23.	"Mi Bello Ángel" (with Natanael Cano)	América Sierra	C. Santos; Conriquez	3:08
Total length:				65:41

Deluxe edition track listing
No.	Title	Writer(s)	Producer(s)	Length
24.	"Al Servicio" (with Grupo Firme)	Hector Guerrero	Alfonso de la Cruz García; C. Santos; Conriquez	2:29
25.	"El Menos Visto" (with Panter Bélico)	Joel Amilcar Portillo	C. Santos; Conriquez; Arturo González; Joel Portillo	3:03
26.	"GTA" (with Jasiel Nuñez)	Jasiel Nuñez	C. Santos; Conriquez; Fernández; Jasiel Nuñez	2:33
27.	"El Barbón (El Phoenix)" (with Enigma Norteño and Joel de la P)	Ernesto Barajas; J. Portillo; Kike Torres; Laija García	C. Santos; Conriquez; Ernesto Barajas	2:39
28.	"El 2" (with Grupo Marca Registrada)	Fidel Osvaldo Castro	C. Santos; Conriquez	3:18
29.	"La 701" (with Panter Bélico)	Laija García	C. Santos; Conriquez; A. González	2:59
30.	"Marinelas" (with Miguel Cornejo)	César Jesús Moreno Alarcón; Jorge Luis Tirado Tirado; Mario Moreno Chan; Miguel Ángel Cornejo Molina	C. Santos; Miguel Cornejo	2:55
31.	"Un Joven con Talento"	Bryan Renee González	C. Santos; Conriquez	3:40
32.	"Todo Bien" (with El Rabbanito)	Carlos Humberto Esquerra Ramírez	C. Santos; Conriquez	3:26
Total length:				92:00

== Charts ==
Chart performance for Corridos Bélicos, Vol. IV
Chart (2024)	Peak position
US Billboard 200	36
US Independent Albums (Billboard)	5
US Regional Mexican Albums (Billboard)	3
US Top Latin Albums (Billboard)	5
