= $ad Boyz 4 Life II =

$ad Boyz 4 Life III

Studio album by Junior H
- Released: 5 October 2023
- Genres: Regional Mexican; urban sierreño; pop rock; ranchera
- Length: 60:00
- Language: Spanish
- Labels: Warner Music Latina; Rancho Humilde
- Producers: Antonio Herrera Perez; Jimmy Humilde; Ernesto Fernandez

Junior H chronology
Contingente (2022)	$ad Boyz 4 Life III (2023)	DEPR</3$$ED MFKZ (2026)

Singles from $ad Boyz 4 Life II
- 1. "Y Lloro" Released: 6 October 2023; 2. "$ad Boyz II" Released: 1 November 2023

$ad Boyz 4 Life II is the eighth solo studio album by Mexican singer-songwriter Junior H. It was released on 5 October 2023, through Rancho Humilde and Warner Music Latina. A sequel to Herrera's fifth studio album, $ad Boyz 4 Life (2021), the album contains urban sierreño tracks with fusions of pop rock and ranchera sounds and features no collaborations, in which he considered as "more of an accident". It debuted at number 14 on the US Billboard 200 with 32,000 album-equivalent units, making it his biggest album debut.

== Background and composition ==
Herrera did not plan on releasing a sequel album of $ad Boyz 4 Life, and had also called the album as "more of an accident" since fellow collaborators such as Peso Pluma and Natanael Cano were going to be featured on the album but "couldn't make it", ending up as a solo album. The album's release date was announced on the singer's Instagram account for pre-save on Spotify. The album blends pop rock music with regional Mexican music, with songs such as "Otro Amor" and "Miles de Rosas" having a "dreamy" sound.

== Promotion and release ==
$ad Boyz 4 Life II was released on 5 October 2023 on all streaming platforms, with accompanying lyric videos for each song being uploaded onto Junior H's YouTube channel. Considered a fan favorite from the album, "Y Lloro" was released as its lead single a day later. It debuted at number 14 on the US Billboard 200 and number two on both Top Latin Albums and Regional Mexican Albums charts with 32,000 album-equivalent units.

== Track listing ==
$ad Boyz 4 Life track listing
No.	Title	Writer(s)	Length
1.	"$ad Boyz II"	Antonio Herrera Pérez; Daniel Candia	3:28
2.	"Rockstar"	Gael Leonardo Iñiguez Valenzuela; Jorge Jiménez Sanchez	2:48
3.	"Serpiente"	Herrera Pérez	3:46
4.	"La Cherry"	Iñiguez Valenzuela	3:32
5.	"Miéntele"	Herrera Pérez	2:56
6.	"Y Lloro"	Iñiguez Valenzuela	2:59
7.	"Las Noches"	Herrera Pérez	3:46
8.	"Tres Botellas"	Iñiguez Valenzuela	2:42
9.	"Miles de Rosas"	Herrera Pérez	4:11
10.	"Paris"	Candia	3:56
11.	"Otro Amor"	Herrera Pérez	4:07
12.	"En La Peda"	Gabriel Ballesteros Abril; Iñiguez Valenzuela	3:54
13.	"Piénsalo"	Herrera Pérez	4:00
14.	"A Tu Nombre"	Iñiguez Valenzuela	4:07
15.	"Lokeron x Amor"	Herrera Pérez	3:11
16.	"Mientras Duermes"	Herrera Pérez	3:46
17.	"Entre Nosotros"	Iñiguez Valenzuela; Jiménez Sanchez	2:45
Total length:			60:00

Notes

- Every song is stylized in all capital letters. For example, "Otro Amor" is stylized as "OTRO AMOR".

== Charts ==
=== Weekly charts ===
Weekly chart performance for $ad Boyz 4 Life II
Chart (2023–2025)	Peak position
US Billboard 200	14
US Regional Mexican Albums (Billboard)	1
US Top Latin Albums (Billboard)	2

=== Year-end charts ===
2024 year-end chart performance for $ad Boyz 4 Life II
Chart (2024)	Position
US Billboard 200	92

== Certifications ==
Certifications for $ad Boyz 4 Life II
Region	Certification	Certified units/sales
Mexico (AMPROFON)	Diamond+3× Platinum	1,120,000^{‡}
United States (RIAA)	16× Platinum (Latin)	960,000^{‡}
^{‡} Sales+streaming figures based on certification alone.
