= Que Sigan Llegando las Pacas =

2024 studio album by Chino Pacas

Studio album by Chino Pacas
- Released: 18 October 2024
- Genre: Regional Mexican
- Length: 37:07
- Language: Spanish
- Label: PFL; Street Mob; Geffen
- Producer: Armenta; Charlygtzz; Chino Pacas; Danitello; Moisés López; MDS; Jesús Ortíz Paz; Otis; Preme; Rabba; Turo Pacas

Singles from Que Sigan Llegando las Pacas
- 1. "El Gordo Trae el Mando" Released: 27 January 2023; 2. "Dijeron Que No La Iba Lograr" Released: 14 March 2023; 3. "Tunechi" Released: 26 April 2024; 4. "Mami Chula" Released: 14 June 2024; 5. "Otra Vez Pegué un Vergazo" Released: 13 September 2024; 6. "Modo Capone" Released: 18 October 2024

Que Sigan Llegando las Pacas (transl. Keep the Packs Coming) is the debut studio album by Mexican singer and songwriter Chino Pacas. It was released on 18 October 2024, through PFL, Street Mob and Geffen. It was released through a one-album deal with Canadian rapper Drake, who launched the PFL record label for the deal. It contains guest appearances from the aforementioned singer, Junior H, Fuerza Regida, Gabito Ballesteros, among others. Five singles were released to support the album, "El Gordo Trae el Mando", "Dijeron Que No La Iba Lograr", "Tunechi", "Mami Chula" and "Otra Vez Pegué un Vergazo".

== Background ==
In 2022, Chino Pacas began his music career by uploading songs onto the social platform TikTok, which attracted the attention of Jesús Ortíz Paz, the lead vocalist of regional Mexican band Fuerza Regida, who signed him onto his record label, Street Mob Records. On 27 January 2023, he released his debut single "El Gordo Trae el Mando" under the label, which went viral on social platform TikTok and debuted at number 84 on the US Billboard Hot 100.

Following the success, he was later seen with Canadian rapper Drake in a club party in Miami, which rose speculation that both artists were going to collaborate. In July 2024, he revealed that he had been working on his debut album for over a year and confirmed that a collaboration with Fuerza Regida would be included on it. The following month, Ortíz revealed on the Bootleg Kev podcast that Drake was launching a record label named PFL, which he will use as a one-album deal with Chino Pacas.

== Promotion ==
"Tunechi" was released on 26 April 2024 as the third single from the album. "Mami Chula" was released on 14 June 2024 as the album's fourth single. In October 2024, Chino Pacas revealed the track list for Que Sigan Llegando las Pacas and its release date as 18 October 2024, which is on his birthday. The announcement also features a short clip, which was posted onto Instagram, which contains footage of the recording for a music video, suspected as "Modo Capone". On 10 October 2024, he shared a 28-second snippet of "Modo Capone" on the same platform, which features hi-hats and a synth line. "Modo Capone" was released as the sixth single from the album on 18 October 2024, along with an accompanying music video.

== Track listing ==
Que Sigan Llegando las Pacas track listing
No.	Title	Writer(s)	Producer(s)	Length
1.	"Smith" (with Junior H and Fuerza Regida)	Cristian Ávila Vega; Miguel Armenta; Diego Ávila Vega; Carlos Gutierrez Lopez; Roberto Gutierrez Lopez; Antonio Herrera Pérez; Jesús Ortíz Paz	Chino Pacas; Armenta; Charlygtzz; Jesús Ortíz Paz; Rabba; Turo Pacas	3:28
2.	"Morena Canela"	C. Ávila Vega; Armenta; R. Gutierrez Lopez; Sebastian Ruiz Garcia	Chino Pacas; Armenta; Charlygtzz; Rabba	2:58
3.	"Pues Podemos" (with Turo Pacas)	C. Ávila Vega; D. Ávila Vega	Chino Pacas; Turo Pacas	2:30
4.	"Tunechi" (with Gabito Ballesteros)	C. Ávila Vega; Armenta; Gabito Ballesteros; Daniel Candia; C. Gutierrez Lopez; José Gutierrez Lopez; Ortíz Paz	Chino Pacas; Armenta; Ortíz Paz; Rabba; Charlygtzz	3:32
5.	"Lampareado"	C. Ávila Vega; D. Ávila Vega; Jonathan Caro; José Ignacio Hernández	Chino Pacas; Turo Pacas	2:20
6.	"3 Letras (OVO)"	C. Ávila Vega; D. Ávila Vega; Candia	Chino Pacas; Turo Pacas	2:53
7.	"Modo Capone" (with Drake and Fuerza Regida)	C. Ávila Vega; Armenta; D. Ávila Vega; Daniel Gutiérrez; Aubrey Graham; Raynford Humphrey; Santeri Kauppinen; Moisés López; Otis Millstone; Daniel Okas; Ortíz Paz	Chino Pacas; Armenta; Danitello; Ortíz Paz; MDS; Moisés López; Otis; Preme; Turo Pacas	3:32
8.	"Queovole Carnal"	C. Ávila Vega; Caro; D. Gutierrez; D. Ávila Vega	Chino Pacas; Turo Pacas	2:37
9.	"Mami Chula"	C. Ávila Vega; Caro; D. Gutierrez	Chino Pacas; Turo Pacas	2:54
10.	"DiCaprio" (with Armenta)	C. Ávila Vega; Armenta; Jorge Jimenez Sanchez	Chino Pacas; Armenta; Charlygtzz; Rabba	3:49
11.	"El Gordo Trae el Mando"	C. Ávila Vega	Chino Pacas	1:52
12.	"Otra Vez Pegué un Vergazo"	C. Ávila Vega; D. Ávila Vega; Caro; D. Gutierrez	Chino Pacas; Turo Pacas	2:49
13.	"Dijeron Que No La Iba Lograr" (with Fuerza Regida)	C. Ávila Vega; Ortíz Paz	Chino Pacas; Turo Pacas	1:53
Total length:				37:07

Que Sigan Llegando las Pacas (Extended) track listing
No.	Title	Writer(s)	Producer(s)	Length
13.	"La Trokita" (with Los Nuevos Rebeldes)	C. Ávila Vega; Kevin Cancino	Chino Pacas; Turo Pacas	3:48
14.	"Que Tranza"	C. Ávila Vega; Jimenez Sanchez	Charlygtzz; Rabba	2:54
15.	"Dijeron Que No La Iba Lograr" (with Fuerza Regida)	C. Ávila Vega; Ortíz Paz	Chino Pacas; Turo Pacas	1:53
Total length:				43:55

== Personnel ==
Musicians

- Chino Pacas – vocals
- Turo Pacas - vocals; executive producer
- Fuerza Regida – vocals; executive producer (tracks 1, 7, 15)
- Junior H – vocals (track 1)
- Drake – vocals (track 7)
- Los Nuevos Rebeldes – vocals (track 13)

Technical

- Enrique Lopez Lezama – mastering (tracks 1–10, 12–15)
- Toptear – mastering, mixing (track 11); engineering (all tracks)
- Jose Luis Cachon – mastering (track 9)
- Oliver Garcia – mixing (tracks 1–10, 12–15)
- Daniel Lebrija – mixing (tracks 1, 2, 4–9, 12–15)
- Daniel Maytza – mixing (tracks 4, 15)
- Rabba – engineering (tracks 1, 2, 7)

== Charts ==
Chart performance for Que Sigan Llegando las Pacas
Chart (2024)	Peak position
US Billboard 200	76
