= Presidente (song) =

2024 single by Gabito Ballesteros, Natanael Cano, Luis R. Conriquez and Netón Vega

Single by Gabito Ballesteros, Natanael Cano, Luis R. Conriquez and Netón Vega

from the album Ya No Se Llevan Serenatas (Deluxe Edition)
- Released: 21 October 2024
- Genre: Corrido tumbado
- Length: 3:01
- Label: Los CT; Interscope
- Songwriters: Gabriel Ballesteros Abril; Natanael Cano; Juan de Dios Lugo Araiza; Daniel Candia
- Producer: Gabito Ballesteros

Gabito Ballesteros singles chronology
"El Gabacho" (2024)	"Presidente" (2024)	"Ese Vato No Te Queda" (2024)

Natanael Cano singles chronology
"Amor Eterno" (2024)	"Presidente" (2024)	"Kamikaze" (2024)

Luis R. Conriquez singles chronology
"Pura Belicada" (2024)	"Presidente" (2024)	"Cholo 7" (2024)

Netón Vega singles chronology
"El Gabacho" (2024)	"Presidente" (2024)	"Loco" (2024)

Music video
- "Presidente" on YouTube

"Presidente" is a song by Mexican musicians Gabito Ballesteros, Natanael Cano, Luis R. Conriquez and Netón Vega, released on 21 October 2024. It was produced by Ballestros himself.

== Composition ==
"Presidente" is a corridos tumbados song that mixes norteño and rap. The lyrics describe the luxury, power and lifestyles of figures involved in drug trafficking. They also reference brands such as Louis Vuitton (and their L'Immensité cologne) and Nike.

== Controversy ==
The song sparked controversy over its mention of a certain drug dealer known as "El Plumas", whose identity is unknown but it has been reported that he would work for the Jalisco New Generation Cartel. The record labels censored the line in accordance with the rules of YouTube.

== Charts ==
=== Weekly charts ===
Weekly chart performance for "Presidente"
Chart (2024)	Peak position
Global 200 (Billboard)	48
Mexico (Billboard)	2
US Bubbling Under Hot 100 (Billboard)	4
US Hot Latin Songs (Billboard)	9

=== Year-end charts ===
Year-end chart performance for "Presidente"
Chart (2025)	Position
Global 200 (Billboard)	174
US Hot Latin Songs (Billboard)	34
