= AMG (song) =

Single by Natanael Cano, Peso Pluma and Gabito Ballesteros

from the album Nata Montana
- Language: Spanish
- Released: November 24, 2022
- Genre: Regional Mexican; corrido tumbado
- Length: 2:54
- Label: Rancho Humilde; Warner Music Latina; Los CT
- Songwriters: Jesús Roberto Laija García; Natanael Cano
- Producer: Lajia García

Natanael Cano singles chronology
"Kilos de Amor" (2022)	"AMG" (2022)	"Ch y la Pizza" (2022)

Peso Pluma singles chronology
"Ando Enfocado" (2022)	"AMG" (2022)	"Delivery" (2022)

Gabito Ballesteros singles chronology
"Y Si Me Miran" (2022)	"AMG" (2022)	"Puro Pa' Delante" (2022)

Music video
- "AMG" on YouTube

"AMG" is a regional Mexican music song by Mexican singers Natanael Cano, Peso Pluma and Gabito Ballesteros. The song was written by Jesús Roberto Laija García and Cano, while it was produced by Laija García. It was published and released as a single on November 24, 2022, through Rancho Humilde, Warner Music Latina and Los CT.

In early 2023, the song went viral on the short video platform TikTok and Facebook, as well as on music platforms such as Spotify and YouTube. The single reached position number 40 on the Billboard Hot 100 chart and number 6 on Hot Latin Songs, both in the United States. In Mexico, it was positioned at number 1 for two consecutive weeks, while in Colombia and Ecuador it was top 25.

== Music and lyrics ==
Musically, the song is a corrido tumbado with arrangements of Sierreño music, its lyrics are an apology for crime and organized crime, highlighting the luxuries, especially the cars and means of transportation, that are allowed to be dedicated to crime, emphasizing the Mercedes-Benz company with the mention of the G63 truck from the Mercedes-AMG division, as well as the GT-R car from the Nissan company. Other luxuries that he mentions are the use of private jets, trips to beaches like Mazatlán, and expensive purchases of footwear like the Nike brand.

== Music video ==
A music video was published at the same time as the song's release as a single, it premiered on Cano's official YouTube channel, was directed by Jhonesanz and recorded in a nightclub called Jakarta Clublife in the city of Hermosillo. In the first days of publication, the video was placed at #1 in trends in Mexico on YouTube, and remained in the top ten until May 2023.

== Charts ==
=== Weekly charts ===
Weekly chart performance for "AMG"
Chart (2023)	Peak position
Colombia (Billboard)	18
Ecuador (Billboard)	15
Global 200 (Billboard)	24
Mexico (Billboard)	1
US Billboard Hot 100	37
US Hot Latin Songs (Billboard)	6

=== Year-end charts ===
Year-end chart performance for "AMG"
Chart (2023)	Position
Global 200 (Billboard)	103
US Hot Latin Songs (Billboard)	14

== Certifications ==
Certifications for "AMG"
Region	Certification	Certified units/sales
United States (RIAA)	7× Platinum (Latin)	420,000^{‡}
^{‡} Sales+streaming figures based on certification alone.
