= Modo Capone =

2024 single by Chino Pacas, Fuerza Regida and Drake

Single by Chino Pacas, Fuerza Regida and Drake

from the album Que Sigan Llegando las Pacas
- Language: Spanish
- Released: 18 October 2024
- Genre: Corridos tumbados; hip hop
- Length: 3:32
- Label: PFL; Street Mob; Geffen
- Songwriters: Cristian Ávila Vega; Aubrey Graham; Daniel Gutiérrez; Daniel Okas; Diego Avila Vega; Jesús Ortíz Paz; Miguel Armenta; Moises Lopez; Otis Millstone; Raynford Humphrey; Santeri Kauppinen
- Producers: Chino Pacas; Armenta; Danitello; JOP; MD$; Moises Lopez; OTIS; Preme; Turo Pacas

Chino Pacas singles chronology
"Otra Vez Pegué un Vergazo" (2024)	"Modo Capone" (2024)

Fuerza Regida singles chronology
"Tu Boda" (2024)	"Modo Capone" (2024)

Drake singles chronology
"Sideways" (2024)	"Modo Capone" (2024)	"Gimme a Hug" (2025)

Music video
- "Modo Capone" on YouTube

"Modo Capone" is a song by Mexican singer-songwriter Chino Pacas, Mexican-American regional Mexican band Fuerza Regida and Canadian rapper Drake. It was released as the sixth single from the former's debut studio album, Que Sigan Llegando las Pacas (2024), on 18 October 2024, through PFL, Street Mob and Geffen.

== Background ==
In May 2023, Chino Pacas was first seen with Canadian rapper Drake at a club party in Miami, with some expecting a collaboration between both artists. On August of the same year, Street Mob Records CEO Jesús Ortíz Paz revealed on the Bootleg Kev podcast that Drake was launching a record label named PFL, which he would later use to release Chino Pacas's debut studio album, Que Sigan Llegando las Pacas (2024), as part of a one-album deal. In October 2024, Chino Pacas revealed the track list for the album, with "Modo Capone" being featured as its seventh track.

== Music and lyrics ==
"Modo Capone" is a song of the corridos tumbados subgenre. On the near end of the song, it transitions into a hip hop beat, which features hi-hats and a synth line. Drake, lyrically, sings about money, wearing jewelry and fleeing to Toronto with a woman. It is the third Spanish-language song Drake has been featured on, and his first since the 2018 single "Mia".

== Release and reception ==
"Modo Capone" was released on 18 October 2024, through Geffen, Street Mob and PFL, as part of Chino Pacas' debut studio album, Que Sigan Llegando las Pacas (2024), and as its sixth single. Upon release, it was met with generally favorable commentary from publications, although opinions from fans were mixed.

== Music video ==
In October 2024, Chino Pacas teased an official music video for "Modo Capone", sharing a video of behind-the-scenes footage for it. It was released on 18 October 2024, along with Que Sigan Llegando las Pacas. Directed by Chris Villa, it features Chino Pacas, Fuerza Regida lead vocalist Jesús Ortíz Paz and Drake in a horseriding venue and a ranch.

== Charts ==
Chart performance for "Modo Capone"
Chart (2024)	Peak position
US Bubbling Under Hot 100 (Billboard)	8
US Hot Latin Songs (Billboard)	11
