= Sideways (Gordo and Drake song) =

Song by Gordo and Drake

from the album Diamante
- Released: July 26, 2024
- Genre: House; Hip hop
- Label: OVO Sound; RCA
- Producer: Gordo

Drake chronology
"Hot Uptown" (2024)	"Sideways" (2024)	"Modo Capone" (2024)

Audio video
- "Sideways" on YouTube

"Sideways" is a song by Guatemalan-American DJ and record producer Gordo (formerly known as Carnage) and Canadian rapper Drake. It serves as the opening track on Gordo's third studio album Diamante, released on July 26, 2024.

== Background ==
Gordo and Drake had previously collaborated, including on six tracks from Drake's 2022 album Honestly, Nevermind, among them "Sticky" and "Massive," as well as "Gently" and "Rich Baby Daddy" from For All the Dogs. Gordo said he had never had someone value his opinion at as high a level as Drake does, calling it a rewarding experience to be appreciated by someone he considers the greatest to ever do it. Gordo teased the collaboration on social media in May 2024 before officially announcing the song's release date on July 23, 2024. The record was slated to appear on Gordo's forthcoming album Diamante, which was set to be released on July 26, 2024.

An unreleased snippet of the song was previewed by German DJ duo Keinemusik at a live show in Brooklyn earlier in July 2024.

== Composition ==
On the track, Drake sings about the heartache of a former lover who did not reciprocate his affection, singing about the relationship abruptly changing direction.

== Release and credits dispute ==
"Sideways" was released alongside Diamante on July 26, 2024, as the album's opening track. Drake also appeared on the closing track, "Healing." A few days later, Drake used his Instagram Stories to say he had helped make a beat for another song on the album, "Cafecito," without receiving a production credit, though he indicated the comment was made lightly.

== Charts ==
Chart (2024)	Peak position
Ireland (IRMA)	100
