= El Gordo Trae el Mando =

2023 single by Chino Pacas

Single by Chino Pacas

from the album Que Sigan Llegando las Pacas
- Language: Spanish
- Released: January 27, 2023
- Genre: Regional Mexican, urban sierreño
- Length: 1:52
- Label: Street Mob
- Songwriter: Cristian Ávila

Chino Pacas singles chronology
"El Gordo Trae el Mando" (2023)	"Negro Como La Pantera" (2023)

Music video
- "El Gordo Trae el Mando" on YouTube

"El Gordo Trae el Mando" (lit. transl. "The fat man brings the command") is the debut single by Mexican singer Chino Pacas, released on January 27, 2023 via Street Mob Records. It is his first and highest charting song on the Billboard Hot 100, debuting at number 84 and peaking at number 58.

== Background ==
The song gained popularity through the video-sharing platform TikTok, with focus on the lyric "Y mi compa Mario, que nunca me ha dejao" ("And my compa Mario who never leaves me").

== Composition ==
The instrumental of the song contains a guitar rhythm. The rhythm is similarly used in another Chino Pacas single with Fuerza Regida, "Dijeron Que No La Iba Lograr".

== Charts ==
=== Weekly charts ===
Weekly chart performance for "El Gordo Trae el Mando"
Chart (2023)	Peak position
Global 200 (Billboard)	44
US Billboard Hot 100	58
US Hot Latin Songs (Billboard)	11

=== Year-end charts ===
Year-end chart performance for "El Gordo Trae El Mondo"
Chart (2023)	Position
Global 200 (Billboard)	174
US Hot Latin Songs (Billboard)	20

== Certifications ==
Certifications for "El Gordo Trae el Mando"
Region	Certification	Certified units/sales
United States (RIAA)	34× Platinum (Latin)	2,040,000^{‡}
^{‡} Sales+streaming figures based on certification alone.
