= Y Lloro =

Single by Junior H

from the album $ad Boyz 4 Life II
- Language: Spanish
- English title: "And I Cry"
- Released: 6 October 2023
- Genre: Regional Mexican; urban sierreño
- Length: 2:59
- Label: Warner Music Latina; Rancho Humilde
- Songwriter: Gael Leonardo Iñiguez Valenzuela
- Producers: Antonio Herrera Perez; Jimmy Humilde; Ernesto Fernandez

Junior H singles chronology
"Guerreros Aztecas" (2023)	"Y Lloro" (2023)

"Y Lloro" (stylized in all capital letters) is a song by Mexican singer and composer Junior H. It was released on 6 October 2023 as the lead single for the singer's album $ad Boyz 4 Life II. The song was written by Gael Leonardo Iñiguez Valenzuela and was produced by the singer himself, along with Jimmy Humilde and Ernesto Fernandez.

== Commercial performance ==
"Y Lloro" debuted on the Billboard Hot 100 chart, peaking at number 97. The song also debuted on the Billboard Global 200 chart at number 92, the Hot Latin Songs chart at number 12, and the Mexico Songs chart at number 8.

== Promotion ==
=== Music video ===
An official music video for the song was uploaded on 6 October 2023 through Junior H's YouTube channel. The music video was filmed in Los Angeles, California.

=== Visualizer ===
A visualizer for the song was uploaded on 6 October 2023 through the singer's YouTube channel, along with the other visualizers for the other songs off $ad Boyz 4 Life II.

== Charts ==
=== Weekly charts ===
Weekly chart performance for "Y Lloro"
Chart (2023–2024)	Peak position
Global 200 (Billboard)	77
Mexico (Billboard)	6
US Billboard Hot 100	79
US Hot Latin Songs (Billboard)	10
US Latin Airplay (Billboard)	26
US Regional Mexican Airplay (Billboard)	9

=== Year-end charts ===
Year-end chart performance for "Y Lloro"
Chart (2024)	Position
Global 200 (Billboard)	151
US Hot Latin Songs (Billboard)	14

== Certifications ==
Certifications for "Y Lloro"
Region	Certification	Certified units/sales
United States (RIAA)	19× Platinum (Latin)	1,140,000^{‡}
^{‡} Sales+streaming figures based on certification alone.
