= Qué Onda =

2023 single by Calle 24, Chino Pacas and Fuerza Regida

Single by Calle 24, Chino Pacas and Fuerza Regida
- Language: Spanish
- Released: August 30, 2023
- Genre: Urban sierreño, ranchera
- Length: 3:11
- Label: Street Mob; Rancho Humilde
- Songwriters: Diego Millán; Cristian Avila; Jesús Ortiz Paz; Jonathan Caro; Miguel Armenta; Rudy Topete
- Producers: Angel Tumbado; JOP

Calle 24 singles chronology
"Moda" (2023)	"Qué Onda" (2023)	"Malo Es No Hacer Billete" (2023)

Chino Pacas singles chronology
"Gorra L.A." (2023)	"Qué Onda" (2023)	"Que Sigan Llegando Las Pacas" (2023)

Fuerza Regida singles chronology
"Tiki Taka Toco" (2023)	"Qué Onda" (2023)	"El Jefe" (2023)

"Qué Onda" is a song by the regional Mexican band Calle 24, Mexican singer-songwriter Chino Pacas and American regional Mexican band Fuerza Regida. It was released on August 30, 2023, and was produced by Angel Tumbado and Jesús Ortiz Paz. It is the former's breakout single, peaking at number 61 on the Billboard Hot 100 chart.

== Background ==
Diego Millán, the leader of Calle 24, made the song on a request from another group. He and Miguel Armenta started working on the song around August 2023 in California. He said, "and midway through it, we said, 'It's coming along very well.' That same day we recorded it, and it was something very impressive. So, the other project didn't happen, and I was like, 'Well, I'm going to take my song,' because I wrote it. [JOP] told me we should do it together, so we uploaded a reel to Instagram, promoting the song. That day, we added the voices, and we did not imagine [the results]. That night it accumulated several million [streams]. It was something crazy."

On the day the song was released, the truck of Fuerza Regida's security team was attacked in Veracruz by criminals, who killed a member of the team. Following the incident, the song went viral on the video-sharing platform TikTok.

== Charts ==
=== Weekly charts ===
Chart performance for "Qué Onda"
Chart (2023)	Peak position
Global 200 (Billboard)	26
Mexico (Billboard)	1
US Billboard Hot 100	61
US Hot Latin Songs (Billboard)	8

=== Year-end charts ===
Year-end chart performance for "Qué Onda"
Chart (2024)	Position
Global 200 (Billboard)	130
US Hot Latin Songs (Billboard)	15

== Certifications ==
Certifications for "Qué Onda"
Region	Certification	Certified units/sales
United States (RIAA)	Diamond (Latin)	600,000^{‡}
^{‡} Sales+streaming figures based on certification alone.
