= Gabito Ballesteros =

Mexican singer-songwriter (born 1999)

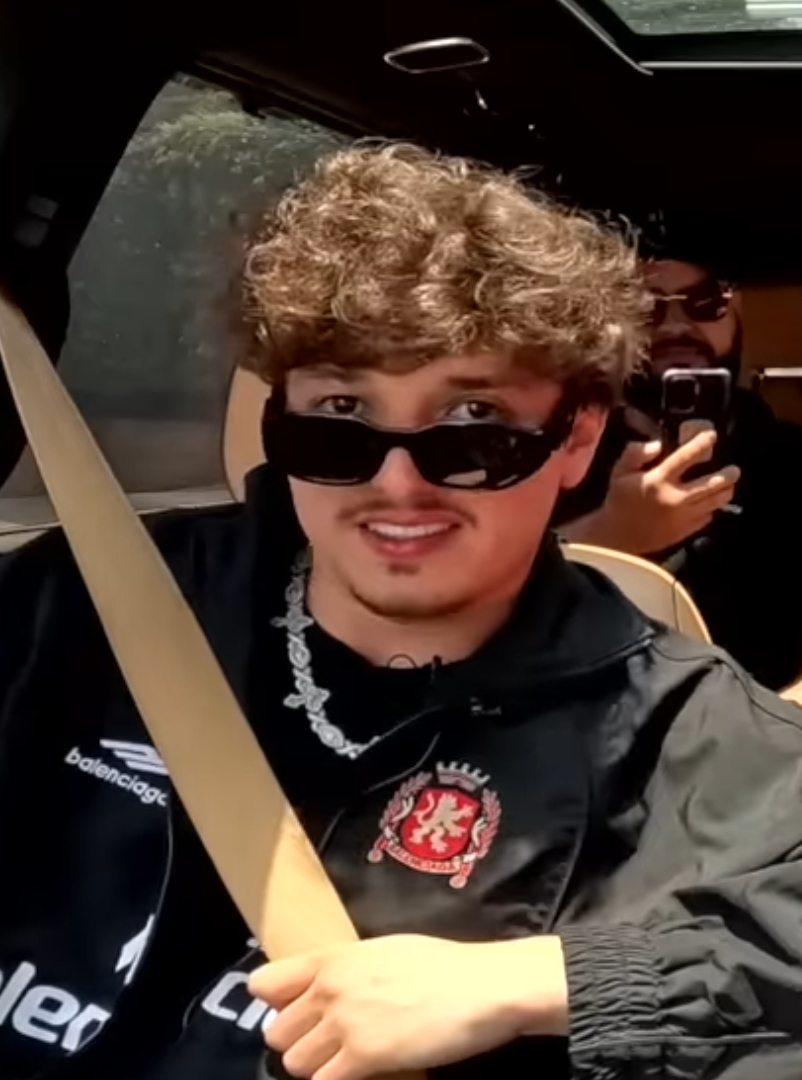
- Ballesteros in 2025

Background information
- Born: 23 July 1999 (age 27); Cumpas, Sonora, Mexico
- Genres: Regional Mexican; corridos tumbados
- Occupations: Singer; rapper; musician; record producer
- Instruments: Vocals; guitar
- Years active: 2014–2015; 2020–present
- Label: Los CT

Gabriel "Gabito" Ballesteros Abril (born 23 July 1999) is a Mexican singer-songwriter and record producer. He is considered one of the rising acts in the corridos tumbados movement, following in the footsteps of artists such as Peso Pluma, Natanael Cano, and Junior H. He is best known for collaborating with these artists on singles such as "AMG" in 2022 and "Lady Gaga" in 2023, both of which charted on the Billboard Hot 100 and reached number 1 in Mexico. Ballesteros also collaborated with Becky G in the 2023 single, "La Nena".

== Early life ==
Gabito Ballesteros Abril was born on 23 July 1999 in Cumpas, Sonora, to Gabriel Ballesteros Guzmán and Mónica Abril Medina, both from Cumpas. He has two sisters. At the age of eight, Ballesteros was taught to play guitar by his mother and he began playing in a choir at the local Parroquia de Nuestra Señora de Guadalupe church. When he was nine, he joined a children's mariachi band formed by the priest that played at religious celebrations in town. Ballesteros soon learned to play other instruments such as the trumpet, violin, and vihuela, but was chosen as the group's lead vocalist after a rendition of "El Rey". He led the group to local notoriety as they began playing at a wide variety of events in the region.

Ballesteros attended the Escuela Secundaria Prof. Rafael N. Varela for secondary school and won first place in many musical competitions. At the age of 14, he took a music course in Hermosillo over the summer, which motivated him to begin uploading covers to Facebook and YouTube. Ballesteros also learned to play bass guitar from the parish priest and formed part of a group called Diamante Norteño. He has stated that he drew inspiration from artists such as Joan Sebastian, Remmy Valenzuela, and Julión Álvarez.

== Career ==
Ballesteros first went viral when his cover of the song "Apagaré La Luz" was reposted by the original artist, Hermanos Vega Jr. In September 2014, he performed alongside Apache Nueva Imagen at the Tucson Expo Center in Tucson, Arizona. Ballesteros also joined Grupo Laberinto on stage at another event. The following month, he signed a deal with No Name Records and New Generation Music. Ballesteros recorded professionally for the first time in January 2015. Soon thereafter he released his debut single, "Yo Quiero Ser" featuring La Destructiva Norteño Banda, which received some regional airplay. However, he decided to put a pause on his musical career in order to fulfill his parents' wishes and pursue his education, as he later explained in an interview with Billboard; Ballesteros earned his degree in industrial engineering in 2022. During this time, he developed a friendship with Natanael Cano and eventually signed to his record label, Los CT.

Ballesteros released his second single, a collaboration with Aldo Trujillo titled "El Rompecabezas", in August 2020, followed by a solo single, "Fuentes de Ortiz", the following month. In March 2022, he released his breakout single, "El Chamán". The song, which he co-produced with José Ángel Félix, surpassed three million streams on Spotify within a few weeks of its release. Ballesteros followed this with a single titled "El Sereno" in May. He then collaborated with Junior H on the single "Vamos Para Arriba" in June, followed by a duet with Iván Orozco titled "El Piquetito" in July. In early November, Ballesteros released "Y Si Me Miran", a collaboration with Natanael Cano and Luis R. Conriquez.

On 24 November 2022, Ballesteros collaborated with Natanael Cano and Peso Pluma to release "AMG", a single named after the Mercedes-AMG G 63. A music video was uploaded to Cano's YouTube channel the next day featuring the trio partying in the Mexican city nightlife, splicing in between footage of Mexican brass players. "AMG" was Ballesteros' first entry in Billboard Hot Latin Songs, debuting at number 41 on the week dated 10 December. It also debuted at number 25 on Mexico Songs the next week. "AMG" climbed to number 10 in Mexico Songs on the chart dated 14 January 2023, becoming Ballesteros' first top-ten hit, before reaching number 3 the following week. He earned his second entry in Hot Latin Songs when "Vamos Para Arriba" appeared at number 32 on the chart dated 28 January. With 5.8 million US streams, "AMG" debuted at number 92 in the Billboard Hot 100 chart ending on 4 February, marking the singer's first Hot 100 entry of his career. It also rose to number 10 in Hot Latin Songs, becoming his first top-ten hit on that chart. "AMG" later surged to number one on the Mexico Songs chart and peaked at number 6 in Hot Latin Songs on 25 February. The song later peaked at number 37 on the Billboard Hot 100 list in May.

On 13 January 2023, Ballesteros released a solo single titled "Puro Pa' Delante". The following month, he released a collaboration with Calle 24 titled "Dante", followed by a collaboration with Fuerza Regida, "Vete Ya", two days later. The latter received six million streams in two weeks. A week after that, Ballesteros released a collaboration with Miguel Cornejo titled "La Bolsa Gucci", which was streamed 15 million times in two weeks. In early March, Ballesteros collaborated with Junior H for a second time to release a single titled "Ya Corazón", which was streamed 25 million times in the first two weeks. The song peaked at number 28 on the Mexico Songs chart.

He joined Natanael Cano on his Tumbado Tour in 2023.

He was named the Billboard Latin Artist on the Rise for July 2023.

In December 2023, he signed a publishing deal with Warner Chappell Music (WCM). "Gabito is shaping the future of Latin music by blending traditional Mexican rhythms with modern melodies and production," said Gustavo Menéndez, president of the WCM U.S. Latin & Latin America division. "His talent has reminded us that music and songwriting are universal, and we’re so proud to partner with him as he continues to cement his place as one of Latin’s top acts."

In January 2024, Ballesteros was included in Billboard's "15 Latin & Spanish Artists to Watch in 2024" list.

Ballesteros released his debut full-length album The GB on 23 May 2024.

== Personal life ==
Ballesteros is in a relationship with actress Samadhi Zendejas.

Ballesteros was detained on 13 November 2026 after a live performance of the song "AMG" at the Feria Internacional Ganadera de Querétaro in Querétaro, reportedly as part of the Mexican government's crackdown on narcocorridos. The show was initially suspended by municipal authorities after he performed an unauthorized song, though he performed "AMG" after he was allowed back on stage and the concert was stopped. Ballesteros was arrested by state police the following morning before being transferred to federal authorities, who announced an investigation into the artist.

== Discography ==
=== Studio albums ===
Title	Details	Peak chart positions		
Title	Details	US	US Latin	US Reg. Mex.
The GB	Released: 23 May 2024; Label: Los CT Records; Formats: Digital download, streaming	65	5	3
Ya No Se Llevan Serenatas	Released: 24 May 2025; Label: Los CT Records; Formats: Digital download, streaming	—	—	—

=== Live albums ===
- Levemente En Vivo desde Hermosillo (2020)
- De Mis Favoritas (En Vivo) Vol. 1 (2021)
- SS23 (with Remmy Valenzuela) (2023)

=== Singles ===
==== As lead artist ====
List of singles, with selected chart positions, and album name
Title	Year	Peak chart positions				Certifications	Album
Title	Year	MEX	US	US Latin	WW	Certifications	Album
"Yo Quiero Ser" (featuring La Destructiva Norteño Banda)	2015	—	—	—	—		Non-album singles
"Por Qué Sera?" (with Daniel Flores)	2018	—	—	—	—		Non-album singles
"El Rompecabezas" (with Aldo Trujillo)	2020	—	—	—	—		Se Encienden las Turbinas
"Fuentes de Ortiz"	2020	—	—	—	—		Non-album singles
"El Chamán"	2022	—	—	—	—		Non-album singles
"El Sereno"	2022	—	—	—	—		Non-album singles
"Vamos Para Arriba" (with Junior H)	2022	—	—	32	—	RIAA: 5× Platinum (Latin)	Non-album singles
"El Piquetito" (with Iván Orozco)	2022	—	—	—	—		Non-album singles
"Veneno" (with Grupo Los de la O)	2022	—	—	—	—		Pura Manzanita, Vol. 3
"Se Me Quedan Viendo Raro" (with Los Gemelos de Sinaloa)	2022	—	—	—	—		Non-album singles
"Y Si Me Miran" (with Luis R. Conriquez and Natanael Cano)	2022	—	—	—	—		Non-album singles
"AMG" (with Natanael Cano and Peso Pluma)	2022	1	37	6	24	RIAA: 7× Platinum (Latin)	Nata Montana
"Puro Pa' Delante"	2023	—	—	—	—		Non-album singles
"Dante" (with Calle 24)	2023	—	—	—	—		Non-album singles
"Vete Ya" (with Fuerza Regida)	2023	—	—	—	—		Non-album singles
"Si Esta Botella Hablara" (with Edgardo Nuñez)	2023	—	—	—	—		No Ando Solo
"La Bolsa Gucci" (with Miguel Cornejo)	2023	—	—	—	—		Non-album singles
"Ya Corazón" (with Junior H)	2023	28	—	—	—		Non-album singles
"El Tsurito" (with Junior H and Peso Pluma)	2023	15	— (Note: "El Tsurito" did not enter the Billboard Hot 100, but peaked at number six on the Bubbling Under Hot 100 chart.)	28	127	RIAA: 4× Platinum (Latin)	Non-album singles
"Paso A Pasito" (with Conexión Divina)	2023	—	—	—	—		Tres Mundos
"Fendi"	2023	—	—	—	—		Non-album singles
"Ando Sad" (with Marca MP)	2023	—	—	—	—		Non-album singles
"Bélico Enamorado" (with DannyLux)	2023	—	—	—	—		Non-album singles
"Saquen Plan" (with David Ornelas)	2023	—	—	—	—		Non-album singles
"El Flakito" (with Uriel Gaxiola)	2023	—	—	—	—		Non-album singles
"No Se Va Poder" (with Tito Torbellino Jr & Remmy Valenzuela)	2023	—	—	—	—		Torbellino
"La Mamoncita del Insta" (with Luis R Conriquez)	2023	—	—	—	—		Non-album single
"La Nena" (with Becky G)	2023	—	—	—	—		Esquinas
"Lady Gaga" (with Peso Pluma and Junior H)	2023	1	35	1	13		Génesis
"La Pelinegra" (with La Adictiva)	2023	—	—	—	—		On The Road
"Me Liberé" (with Piso 21)	2023	—	—	—	—		Los Muchachos
"Mood Malandro" (with Código FN)	2023	—	—	—	—		Non-album single
"Skin de Bandida" (with Junior H and Oscar Maydon)	2023	28	—	—	—		Distorsión
"Lou Lou" (with Natanael Cano)	2023	—	— (Note: "Lou Lou" did not enter the Billboard Hot 100, but peaked at number 13 on the Bubbling Under Hot 100 chart.)	—	76		The GB
"A Puro Dolor"	2023	17	—	—	—		The GB
"Tendido" (with Tito Double P)	2023	—	—	—	—		Incómodo
"Tipo Gatsby" (with Óscar Maydon & Natanael Cano)	2023	—	—	—	—		Distorsión
"Otra Noche" (with Grupo Firme)	2023	—	—	—	—		Non-album single
"Elvira" (with Óscar Maydon and Chino Pacas)	2023	9	—	24	190		Distorsión
"Cosas de la Peda" (with Prince Royce)	2024	—	—	—	—		Llamada Perdida
"Proyecto X" (with Natanael Cano)	2024	—	—	—	—		Non-album single
"Un Shot" (with Wisin)	2024	—	—	—	—		Mr. W
"Saudade" (with AgroPlay & Ana Castela)	2024	—	—	—	—		Non-album singles
"Un Idiota"	2024	—	—	—	—		Non-album singles
"El Boss" (with Natanael Cano)	2024	—	—	—	—		The GB
"Porque Te Vas" (with Victor Cibrian)	2024	—	—	—	—		Non-album single
"Tunechi" (with Chino Pacas)	2024	—	—	—	—		Que Sigan Llegando Las Pacas
"Sin Yolanda" (with Peso Pluma)	2024	—	—	—	—		The GB
"Rococo" (with Óscar Maydon)	2024	—	—	—	—		The GB
"Bonus Track" (with Joan Sebastian)	2024	—	—	—	—		Volví Pa'l Pueblo Acompañado Vol. 1 - EP
"Superstar" (with Juanchito)	2024	—	—	—	—		Non-album single
"Detona" (with Tito Double P)	2024	—	—	—	—		Incómodo
"Sin Querer Queriendo" (with Herencia De Grandes)	2024	—	—	—	—		Non-album singles
"Pienso En Ella" (with Grupo Frontera)	2024	—	—	—	—		Non-album singles
"El Gabacho" (with Código FN & Netón Vega)	2024	—	—	—	—		XV Recargado
"Ese Vato No Te Queda" (with Carín León)	2024	—	—	—	—		Non-album single
"Presidente" (with Natanael Cano, Luis R Conriquez & Netón Vega)	2024	2	— (Note: "Presidente" did not enter the Billboard Hot 100, but peaked at number four on the Bubbling Under Hot 100 chart.)	9	48		Ya No Se Llevan Serenatas (Deluxe)
"Mono Verde"	2024	—	—	—	—		Non-album singles
"Las Minitas" (with Victor Cibrian)	2024	—	—	—	—		Non-album singles
"Que Pedo" (with Eddy)	2025	—	—	—	—		Non-album singles
"7 Días" (with Tito Double P)	2025	—	84	—	39		Ya No Se Llevan Serenatas
"Perdido"	2025	—	—	—	—		Ya No Se Llevan Serenatas
"Te Engañé" (with Los Dareyes De La Sierra)	2025	—	—	—	—		Redención
"Months" (with Panter Bélico)	2025	—	—	—	—		Non-album single
"Amarre" (with Jorsshh)	2025	—	—	—	—		Ya No Se Llevan Serenatas (Deluxe)
"Perra Madre" (with Armenta)	2025	—	—	—	—		Non-album singles
"Cartier" (with Xavi)	2025	—	—	—	—		Non-album singles
"Rolex Presidente"	2025	—	—	—	—		Non-album singles
"Dame Un Grrr (Gabito Ballesteros Version)" (with Fantomel & Kate Linn)	2025	—	—	—	—		Non-album singles
"X Los Dos" (with Armenta & Jonathan Caro)	2025	—	—	—	—		Ya No Se Llevan Serenatas (Deluxe)
"Waxha" (with Pabblo & Jorsshh)	2025	—	—	—	—		Ya No Se Llevan Serenatas (Deluxe)
"Sargento" (with Calle 24)	2025	—	—	—	—		Ya No Se Llevan Serenatas (Deluxe)
"Chrome Hearts" (with Fuerza Regida)	2025	—	—	—	—		Ya No Se Llevan Serenatas (Deluxe)
"Viernes" (with Reik)	2025	—	—	—	—		TQ+
"Afterlife" (with Adriel Favela)	2025	—	—	—	—		Non-album single

==== As featured artist ====
List of singles, and album name
Title	Year	Album
"Se Habla de un Muchacho" (Alejandro Buelna featuring Natanael Cano, Dan Sanchez & Gabito Ballesteros)	2023	Non-album singles
"Ya Comieron?" (Giovanny Ayala featuring Gabito Ballesteros)	2023	Non-album singles
"La Fresa" (Eslabón Armado featuring Gabito Ballesteros)	2023	Non-album singles

=== Guest appearances ===
List of non-single guest appearances, with other performing artists, showing year released and album name
Title	Year	Other artist(s)	Album
"Cuanto Te Quiero (En Vivo)"	2022	Grupo TodoTerreno	En Vivo Desde Cumpas, Sonora
"Se Va Muriendo Mi Alma (En Vivo)"	2022	Grupo TodoTerreno	En Vivo Desde Cumpas, Sonora
"Que Se Te Quite Ese Orgullo (En Vivo)"	2022	Grupo TodoTerreno	En Vivo Desde Cumpas, Sonora
"Pensaron Que No Podia"	2023	Edgardo Nuñez	No Ando Solo
"Dime Que Hay Que Hacer"	2023	DannyLux	DLUX
"F's"	2023	Fuerza Regida	Pa Las Baby's y Belikeada
"El Agujero"	2024	Luis R. Conriquez	Corridos Bélicos, Vol. IV
"Más Perrón Con Los Balenciaga"	2024	Luis R. Conriquez	Corridos Bélicos, Vol. IV
"Arriba las Manos"	2024	Enigma Norteño	XX
"Un Shot"	2024	Wisin	Mr. W
"Vino Tinto"	2024	Peso Pluma; Natanael Cano	Éxodo
"Pegaso"	2025	Neton Vega	Mi Vida Mi Mi Muerte
"Perlas Negras"	2025	Natanael Cano	Porque La Demora
"No Quiere Flores"	2025	Myke Towers	Island Boyz
"Mía"	2025	Victor Mendivil	Tutankamon
"Cuando Me Veas Con Alguien"	2025	Victor Cibrian	E$encia
