= Natanael Cano =

Mexican rapper (born 2001)

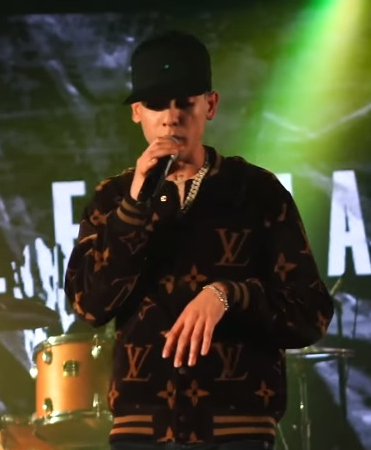
- Cano in 2019
- Born: Nathanahel Rubén Cano Monge; 27 March 2001 (age 25); Hermosillo, Sonora, Mexico
- Occupations: singer; songwriter
- Years active: 2016–present
- Musical career
- Genres: Regional Mexican; corridos; corridos tumbados; Latin trap; reggaeton
- Instruments: Guitar; vocals
- Labels: Rancho Humilde; Warner Latina; Los CT

Nathanahel Rubén Cano Monge (born 27 March 2001) is a Mexican singer-songwriter. He is known for his fusion of regional Mexican corridos, known as corridos tumbados. The idea to fuse the two genres was proposed by Dan Sanchez who wrote Cano's first corrido tumbado, "Soy el Diablo".

== Early life ==
Cano was born in Hermosillo, Sonora. When he was seven, he showed off his talent at family events and parties or wherever he was invited. When he first taught himself to play the piano at thirteen, he learned Mexican band Maná's "Rayando el Sol" off of YouTube. Then he focused on regional Mexican corridos like the ones by Ariel Camacho who was his main source of inspiration. Three years later at 16, he released his first song on YouTube "El de los lentes Gucci" where he first fused hip-hop/trap with corridos, which he now refers to as corridos tumbados.

== Music career ==
=== 2018–2019: Career beginnings, Todo Es Diferente, and Corridos Tumbados ===
Cano began his music career in 2018 by uploading guitar covers to YouTube and later grew into performing underground. In 2019, he eventually signed to the independent label Five Music, where he released his debut single "El de los Lentes Gucci". Later that year, he released his debut studio album Todo Es Diferente. He would eventually get the attention of Jimmy Humilde, who is the owner of Los Angeles-based urban regional Mexican label Rancho Humilde, and signed him onto the label in March 2019 after watching Cano on an Instagram video in early 2019. Following the release of other independent singles, he would release his first single under the Rancho Humilde label, "El Drip", which eventually reached the US Hot Latin Songs chart. He would eventually collaborate with Puerto Rican rapper Bad Bunny on the remix for "Soy el Diablo", which was the second single from his debut album Todo Es Diferente. Following the collaboration, Cano released his second studio album Corridos Tumbados, containing collaborations with Junior H, Nueva Era, Dan Sánchez, among others. A month later, he would release his debut EP, Mi Verdad Corridos Tumbados, with him releasing another EP at the end of 2019, Mi Nuevo Yo.

Cano eventually had partnerships with Warner Music Latin and Apple Music. Cano has been recognized as the artist of the month through Apple Music Up Next, "a show aimed at discovering rising stars that in previous years advanced several of today's top talents".

== Artistry ==
The fusion of trap music and regional Mexican corridos known as corridos tumbados were born in Los Angeles where Cano arrived with Rancho Humilde to showcase his talents. Cano is best known for his creation of corridos tumbados which are inspired in the traditional songs of Mexico and combine the lyrics of trap music and sometimes hip-hop. He could be considered the "king of corridos tumbados" since he has been recognized for his interpretation of this subgenre of corridos. Cano states that the genre of music he specializes on is "the sound of regional Mexican music but with the sound of the new generation that young musicians added". Traditional corridos have consisted of daily tragedies, conflicts and even stories about crime with the subgenres like narcocorridos and lumbre corridos. Before his album, A Mis 20, he has stemmed away from his origins and mostly focused on trap corridos like in his albums Las Torres 3, Soy el Nata, and Trap Tumbado. Cano turned his focus back to corridos tumbados because he said that they are his main focus right now.

Throughout the earlier stages of Cano's music career, Cano was heavily influenced by corridos he grew up listening performed by regional Mexican artists Gerardo Ortíz and Ariel Camacho. Cano says that he if he could see any artist perform dead or alive, it would be Ariel Camacho since he died before Cano got a chance to see him in concert. By his late teens, he became inspired by a corrido group from Orange County, California, Legado 7, known best for their "lumbre corridos" (fire corridos), which they became known for since they broke traditional values and wrote lyrics about weed. Cano's songs are influenced by experiences in his personal life or of his friends. His lyrics are based on events that he has gone through in his life. As a big fan of musicians like Bad Bunny, Jhay Cortez, and J Balvin, Cano is musically inspired by them.

Cano mentions that his goal is to collaborate with many different Latin trap artists, however he would like the collaborations to happen naturally rather than be forced. Cano's dream collaboration would be with Anuel AA, which would eventually be fulfilled in 2025, through both combining on a remix of Cano's song, Como Es. In an interview through Univision, Cano admitted that he also would like to collaborate with Mickey Woods Jr. and Bad Bunny, with the latter later joining Cano on his song, Soy El Diablo.

== Personal life ==
On 20 August 2024, Cano was arrested in Hermosillo for bribery; a video in which he appeared to give money to a police officer had spread on social media in March.

== Discography ==
=== Studio albums ===
Title	Details	Peak chart positions			Certifications
Title	Details	US	US Latin	MEX Reg.	Certifications
Todo Es Diferente	Released: 21 June 2019; Format: Digital download, streaming; Label: Hyphy Music	—	—	—	
Corridos Tumbados	Released: 31 October 2019; Format: Digital download, streaming; Label: Rancho Humilde	166	4	1	RIAA: Platinum (Latin)
Corridos Tumbados, Vol. 2	Released: 29 May 2020; Format: Digital download, streaming; Label: Rancho Humilde	—	13	3	
Soy el Nata	Released: 9 September 2020; Format: Digital download, streaming; Label: Rancho Humilde	—	49	12	
Las 3 Torres (with Ovi and Junior H)	Released: 18 December 2020; Format: Digital download, streaming; Label: WEA Latina	—	—	—	
A Mis 20	Released: 28 May 2021; Format: Digital download, streaming; Label: WEA Latina	—	9	1	RIAA: Platinum (Latin)
NataKong	Released: 8 April 2022; Format: Digital download, streaming; Label: WEA Latina	—	12	—	
Nata Montana	Released: 30 June 2023; Format: Digital download, streaming; Label: WEA Latina	35	5	2	RIAA: 11× Platinum (Latin)
Porque La Demora	Released: 1 July 2025; Format: Digital download, streaming; Label: Los CT	124	8	—	
Natanael Cano, Vol.1	Released: 28 August 2026; Format: Digital download, streaming; Label: Los CT	—	—	—	

=== Extended plays ===
List of extended plays, with selected details and chart positions
Title	Details	Peak chart positions		Certifications
Title	Details	US Latin	MEX Reg.	Certifications
Mi Verdad Corridos Tumbados	Released: 22 November 2019; Format: Digital download, streaming; Label: LA R Music	—	—	
Mi Nuevo Yo	Released: 24 December 2019; Format: Digital download, streaming; Label: Rancho Humilde	—	—	RIAA: 2× Platinum (Latin)
Corazón Tumbado	Released: 14 February 2020; Format: Digital download, streaming; Label: Rancho Humilde	12	3	RIAA: Platinum (Latin)
Trap Tumbado	Released: 26 June 2020; Format: Digital download, streaming; Label: Rancho Humilde	15	—	
Nata	Released: 16 April 2021; Format: Digital download, streaming; Label: Rancho Humilde	—	—	

=== Singles ===
List of singles as lead artist, with selected chart positions, and album name
Title	Year	Peak chart positions				Certifications	Album
Title	Year	MEX	US	US Latin	WW	Certifications	Album
"El de los Lentes Gucci"	2018	—	—	—	—		Non-album singles
"Sour Diesel"	2018	—	—	—	—		Non-album singles
"Platicame de Ti"	2018	—	—	—	—		Non-album singles
"F1"	2018	—	—	—	—		Non-album singles
"El MB"	2018	—	—	—	—		Non-album singles
"El de La Codeina"	2019	—	—	—	—		Todo Es Diferente
"El Drip"	2019	—	—	44	—	RIAA: 8× Platinum (Latin)	Corridos Tumbados
"Disfruto Lo Malo" (with Junior H)	2019	—	—	24	—		Corridos Tumbados
"Ella" (with Junior H)	2019	—	—	29	—		Corridos Tumbados
"Soy el Diablo" (solo or remix with Bad Bunny)	2019	—	—	16	—	RIAA: 4× Platinum (Latin)	Todo Es Diferente
"El Cazador"	2019	—	—	—	—		Corridos Tumbados
"No Se por Que Tanto Enredo"	2020	—	—	—	—		Non-album single
"Amor Tumbado" (solo or duet with Alejandro Fernández)	2020	8	— (Note: "Amor Tumbado" did not enter the Billboard Hot 100, but peaked at number 10 on the Bubbling Under Hot 100 chart.)	8	—		Mi Nuevo Yo
"Pacas Verdes" (featuring Ovi)	2020	—	—	28	—	RIAA: 5× Platinum (Latin)	Non-album singles
"Asi Es el Morro"	2020	—	—	—	—		Non-album singles
"El Jr."	2020	—	—	—	—		Non-album singles
"Cuenta Conmigo" (with Los Tigres del Norte and Fuerza Regida featuring Ana Bárbara)	2020	—	—	—	—		Non-album singles
"Waxesito"	2020	—	—	—	—		Non-album singles
"Arriba"	2020	—	—	31	—	RIAA: 4× Platinum (Latin)	Non-album singles
"Me Critican"	2020	—	—	—	—		Non-album singles
"Gracias"	2020	—	—	—	—		Non-album singles
"Bandolero" (with Big Soto and Jambene)	2020	—	—	—	—		Non-album singles
"Nubes Blancas"	2020	—	—	—	—		Non-album singles
"Abriendo el Camino"	2020	—	—	—	—		Non-album singles
"Paso el Culiacan" (featuring Junior H)	2020	—	—	—	—		Non-album singles
"Pal Que Dijo Que No" (featuring Ovi)	2020	—	—	—	—		Soy el Nata
"Yo Ya Se"	2020	—	—	—	—		Soy el Nata
"El Mini Barbi"	2020	—	—	—	—		Non-album singles
"Así Tocó Mi Vida" (with Adriel Favela)	2020	—	—	—	—		Non-album singles
"Feeling Good" (with Snoop Dogg and Ovi featuring Snow Tha Product and CNG)	2020	—	—	—	—		Las 3 Torres
"Ele Uve (Remix)" (with Eladio Carrión and Ovi featuring Noriel)	2020	—	—	—	—		Monarca
"Billetes" (with Play-N-Skillz and Nicky Jam)	2020	—	—	—	—		Non-album single
"Verdes Verdes" (with Junior H and Ovi)	2020	—	—	—	—	RIAA: Platinum (Latin)	Las 3 Torres
"Las 3 Torres" (with Ovi and Junior H)	2021	—	—	—	—		Las 3 Torres
"Llenas Las Cuentas" (with Dan Sanchez and Justin Morales featuring Oscar Maydon)	2021	—	—	—	—		Non-album singles
"Bandidos" (with Omy de Oro)	2021	—	—	—	—		Non-album singles
"La Noche Empieza" (with Oscar Maydon)	2021	—	—	—	—		Non-album singles
"Enfermo de Riqueza" (with Lenny Tavárez and Ovi)	2021	—	—	—	—		Non-album singles
"De a De Veras" (with Codiciado)	2022	—	—	—	—		Non-album singles
"Estrellas"	2022	—	—	—	—		NataKong
"Kong 2.0" (with Steve Aoki)	2022	—	—	—	—		Non-album singles
"Selfies"	2022	—	—	—	—	RIAA: 2× Platinum (Latin)	Non-album singles
"Que Me Importan" (with Victor Cibrian)	2022	—	—	—	—	RIAA: Platinum (Latin)	Non-album singles
"Y Si Me Miran" (with Luis R. Conriquez and Gabito Ballesteros)	2022	—	—	—	—		Non-album singles
"Kilos de Amor" (with Tokischa)	2022	—	—	—	—		Non-album singles
"AMG" (with Gabito Ballesteros and Peso Pluma)	2022	1	37	6	20	RIAA: 7× Platinum (Latin)	Nata Montana
"CH y la Pizza" (with Fuerza Regida)	2022	7	68	9	39	AMPROFON: 2× Diamond	Pa Que Hablen
"Kilos de H" (with Óscar Maydon)	2022	—	—	—	—		Non-album singles
"Morritas"	2022	—	—	—	—	RIAA: Platinum (Latin)	Non-album singles
"Cosas Claras, Cosas Buenas" (with Tito Torbellino Jr. and Gabito Ballesteros)	2023	—	—	—	—		Non-album singles
"Lavadachi" (with Dan Sánchez)	2023	—	—	—	—		Non-album singles
"PRC" (with Peso Pluma)	2023	2	33	4	15	RIAA: 4× Platinum (Latin); AMPROFON: Diamond	Génesis
"Don Chon (En Vivo)" (with Juanpa Salazar and Fuerza Regida)	2023	—	—	—	—		Non-album singles
"Una 45" (with Dan Sánchez)	2023	—	—	—	—		Non-album singles
"Como Es Arriba Es Abajo" (with Dan Sánchez)	2023	—	—	—	—	RIAA: 2× Platinum (Latin)	Nata Montana
"Pacas de Billetes"	2023	21	—	37	—	RIAA: Platinum (Latin)	Nata Montana
"Bien Loco" (with Dan Sánchez, Dharius and D-Sides)	2023	—	—	—	—		Non-album singles
"O Me Voy o Te Vas"	2023	13	—	47	—		Non-album singles
"Lou Lou" (with Gabito Ballesteros)	2023	3	— (Note: "Lou Lou" did not enter the Billboard Hot 100, but peaked at number 13 on the Bubbling Under Hot 100 chart.)	19	76		The GB
"Tipo Gatsby" (with Oscar Maydon and Gabito Ballesteros)	2023	—	—	—	—		Distorsión
"Adrenalina" (with Dan Sánchez)	2024	—	—	—	—		Non-album singles
"Proyecto X" (with Gabito Ballesteros)	2024	—	—	49	—		Non-album singles
"Madonna" (with Óscar Maydon)	2024	1	— (Note: "Madonna" did not enter the Billboard Hot 100, but peaked at number nine on the Bubbling Under Hot 100 chart.)	9	26		Non-album singles
"El Boss" (with Gabito Ballesteros)	2024	8	—	33	196		The GB
"Natanael Cano: Bzrp Music Sessions, Vol. 59" (with Bizarrap)	2024	2	—	20	26		Non-album singles
"Entre las de 20" (with Bizarrap)	2024	3	—	26	51		Non-album singles
"300 Noches" (with Belinda)	2024	4	—	41	182		Indomable
"Ya Te Olvidé"	2024	4	—	30	179		Non-album singles
"YCQVM" (with Nueva H)	2024	6	—	38	—		Non-album singles
"Vino Tinto" (with Peso Pluma and Gabito Ballesteros)	2024	3	91	5	96		Éxodo
"Primo" (with Tito Double P)	2024	18	—	39	—		Incómodo
"Giza" (with Óscar Maydon)	2024	7	—	28	—		Non-album singles
"Amor Eterno"	2024	—	—	—	—		Non-album singles
"Presidente" (with Luis R. Conriquez, Gabito Ballesteros, & Neton Vega)	2024	2	—	9	48		Non-album singles
"Amapola" (with Nueva H)	2024	7	—	25	164		Non-album singles
"Olivia La Flaka" (with Tito Double P, Victor Mendivil and Ovi)	2026	2	—	9	46		Non-album singles

=== Other charted and certified songs ===
List of songs, with selected chart positions and certifications, showing album name and year released
Title	Year	Peak chart positions				Certifications	Album
Title	Year	MEX	US Bub.	US Latin	WW	Certifications	Album
"Nataaoki"	2022	20	—	—	—	RIAA: Platinum (Latin)	NataKong
"Carnal" (with Peso Pluma)	2023	5	1	21	157		Génesis
"Mi Bello Ángel"	2023	5	22	27	100	RIAA: Platinum (Latin)	Nata Montana
"Mas Altas Que Bajadas"	2023	14	—	42	—	RIAA: Gold (Latin)	Nata Montana
"Eres" (with Junior H)	2023	17	—	—	—		Nata Montana
"Como Es"	2025	15	—	—	—		Porque La Demora
"Perlas Negras" (with Gabito Ballesteros)	2025	3	—	14	44		Porque La Demora
"Blancanieves"	2025	—	—	42	164		Porque La Demora

== Tours ==
- Tumbando Tour Mexico

== Awards and nominations ==
Award	Year	Category	Nominated work	Result	Ref.
Billboard Latin Music Awards	2021	Regional Mexican Artist of the Year	Natanael Cano	Nominated	
Billboard Latin Music Awards	2022	Regional Mexican Artist of the Year, Solo	Natanael Cano	Nominated	
Billboard Latin Music Awards	2023	Hot Latin Songs Artist of the Year, Male	Natanael Cano	Nominated	
Billboard Latin Music Awards	2023	Regional Mexican Artist of the Year, Solo	Natanael Cano	Nominated	
Billboard Latin Music Awards	2023	Streaming Song of the Year	"PRC" (with Peso Pluma)	Nominated	
Billboard Latin Music Awards	2023	Regional Mexican Song of the Year	"PRC" (with Peso Pluma)	Nominated	
Latin American Music Awards	2021	New Artist of the Year	Natanael Cano	Nominated	
Latin American Music Awards	2021	Favorite Regional Mexican Artist	Natanael Cano	Nominated	
Latin American Music Awards	2021	Album of the Year	Corridos Tumbados	Nominated	
Latin American Music Awards	2021	Favorite Regional Mexican Album	Corridos Tumbados	Nominated	
Latin American Music Awards	2021	Favorite Regional Mexican Song	"Amor Tumbado"	Nominated	
Latin Grammy Awards	2024	Best Contemporary Mexican Music Album	Nata Montana	Nominated	
MTV Europe Music Awards	2022	Best Latin America North Act	Natanael Cano	Nominated	
MTV Europe Music Awards	2023	Best Latin America North Act	Natanael Cano	Nominated	
MTV Millennial Awards	2023	Mexican Artist	Natanael Cano	Won	
MTV Millennial Awards	2024	MIAW Artist	Natanael Cano	Nominated	
MTV Millennial Awards	2024	Regional Artist	Natanael Cano	Won	
MTV Millennial Awards	2024	Celebrity Crush	Natanael Cano	Nominated	
MTV Millennial Awards	2024	Collaboration of the Year	"Madonna" (with Oscar Maydon)	Won	
MTV Millennial Awards	2024	Collaboration of the Year	"300 Noches" (with Belinda)	Nominated	
MTV Millennial Awards	2024	Collaboration of the Year	"El Boss" (with Gabito Ballesteros)	Nominated	
Premios Juventud	2020	The New Regional Mexican Generation	Natanael Cano	Won	
Premios Juventud	2020	Spicy Regional Songs	"Amor Tumbado"	Won	
Premios Juventud	2020	OMG Collaboration	"Soy el Diablo (Remix)" (with Bad Bunny)	Won	
Premios Juventud	2023	Best Regional Mexican Collaboration	"PRC" (with Peso Pluma)	Won	
Premios Lo Nuestro	2021	New Artist – Male	Natanael Cano	Nominated	
Premios Lo Nuestro	2021	Regional Mexican Artist of the Year	Natanael Cano	Nominated	
Premios Lo Nuestro	2021	Regional Mexican Song of the Year	"Amor Tumbado"	Nominated	
Premios Tu Música Urbano	2022	Top Artist — Regional Mexican Urban	Himself	Nominated	
Premios Tu Música Urbano	2022	Top Song — Regional Mexican	"Enfermo de Riqueza" (with Lenny Tavárez and Ovi)	Nominated	
Premios Tu Música Urbano	2022	Top Song — Regional Mexican	"Porte Exuberante" (with Oscar Maydon)	Nominated	
Premios Tu Música Urbano	2022	Top Song — Regional Mexican	"Los 4 Ases (Corrido Tumbado)" (with Ovi, Junior H and Herencia de Patrones)	Nominated	
Premios Tu Música Urbano	2023	Top Artist — Regional Mexican Urban	Natanael Cano	Nominated	
