= Chino Pacas =

Mexican singer–songwriter (born 2006)

- Born: Cristian Humberto Ávila Vega; 18 October 2006 (age 19); Apaseo el Alto, Guanajuato, Mexico
- Genres: Regional Mexican, urban sierreño corridos tumbados
- Years active: 2022–present
- Labels: Street Mob; PFL; Geffen

Cristian Humberto Ávila Vega (born 18 October 2006), better known by his stage name Chino Pacas, is a Mexican singer and songwriter. Specializing in urban sierreño, his international fame began in 2023 when he signed with the Street Mob record company and released his debut single "El Gordo Trae El Mando". The song was met with immediate virality on TikTok before debuting at number 84 on the Billboard Hot 100, making him the youngest Mexican artist — at age 16 — to enter the chart. Ávila is considered one of the artists modernizing the genre for younger generations. He signed with Geffen Records to release his debut studio album, Que Sigan Llegando las Pacas (2024).

== Life and career ==
Ávila Vega was born in the city of Apaseo el Alto, Guanajuato, Mexico. At the age of 10, he played guitar in the rondalla of his school but did not sing because he was shy, an activity that he did do but in a choir of the church he attended. At the age of 12, he moved with his mother and older brother, Diego Vega, known as Turo Pacas, to Tampa, Florida, United States, where he worked in construction without continuing his studies.

In August 2023, he collaborated in the hit "Qué Onda" with Calle 24 and Fuerza Regida, a song that gave his third entry on the Billboard Hot 100 chart. At the end of the same month, he released the song "Que Sigan Llegando Las Pacas" along with a music video recorded in Los Angeles where images of a concert by Canadian singer Drake can be seen. El Debate reported, "[the song] offers a potent combination of authenticity and bravado." The media outlet ContraRéplica described it as "a fiery song with its peculiar urban style."

On 16 July 2023, after a performance as a special guest at a concert by Fuerza Regida, the car that Ávila was being transported in was stopped for allegedly not stopping at a stop sign and he was detained, not arrested, by the Los Angeles Police Department. Diego Millán, vocalist of Calle 24, Jesús Ortíz Paz and the latter's manager were also detained. Hours later they were released except for the manager, as the gun was his property and he had an outstanding warrant for his arrest.

In September 2023, he received the nomination for Artist of the Year – Debut at the Billboard Latin Music Awards, alongside artists such as Bizarrap, Yng Lvcas, Grupo Frontera and Peso Pluma. This being the first nomination of his career. In mid-October, he released his next single "Como Pancho Villa," with which he continued to blend guitar and bass sounds with the traditional corrido sound, the East Portland website highlighting his "unique" deep voice in the song and his vocals. At the end of the month, he appeared in the song "Plvo Blnco" from Fuerza Regida's eighth studio album Pa Las Baby's y Belikeada.

== Discography ==
=== Studio albums ===
List of studio albums with selected details and peak chart positions
Title	Details	Peak chart positions
Title	Details	US
Que Sigan Llegando las Pacas	Released: 18 October 2024; Label: PFL, Street Mob, Geffen; Format: CD, digital download, streaming	76

=== Singles ===
List of singles, with selected chart positions, certifications and album name
Title	Year	Peak chart positions				Certifications	Album
Title	Year	MEX	US	US Latin	WW	Certifications	Album
"El Gordo Trae el Mando"	2023	7	58	11	44	RIAA: 34× Platinum (Latin)	Que Sigan Llegando las Pacas
"Negro Como la Pantera" (with Calle 24)	2023	—	—	—	—	RIAA: 9× Platinum (Latin)	Non-album single
"Dijeron Que No La Iba Lograr" (with Fuerza Regida)	2023	14	— (Note: "Dijeron Que No La Iba Lograr" did not enter the Billboard Hot 100, but peaked at number one on the Bubbling Under Hot 100 chart.)	15	108	RIAA: 8× Platinum (Latin)	Que Sigan Llegando las Pacas
"Qué Onda" (with Calle 24 and Fuerza Regida)	2023	1	61	8	26	RIAA: Diamond (Latin)	Non-album singles
"Apaga el Cel" (with Calle 24)	2023	—	—	—	—	RIAA: 5× Platinum (Latin)	Non-album singles
"Elvira" (with Óscar Maydon and Gabito Ballesteros)	2023	9	—	24	190	AMPROFON: Platinum+Gold	Distorsión
"Que Sigan Llegando las Pacas"	2024	—	—	—	—	RIAA: 2× Platinum (Latin)	Que Sigan Llegando las Pacas
"Modo Capone" (with Fuerza Regida and Drake)	2024	—	— (Note: "Modo Capone" did not enter the Billboard Hot 100, but peaked at number eight on the Bubbling Under Hot 100 chart.)	11	—		Que Sigan Llegando las Pacas
"Ojitos Mentirosos"	2025	—	—	—	85		Non-album single
