= Luis R. Conriquez =

Mexican singer (born 1996)

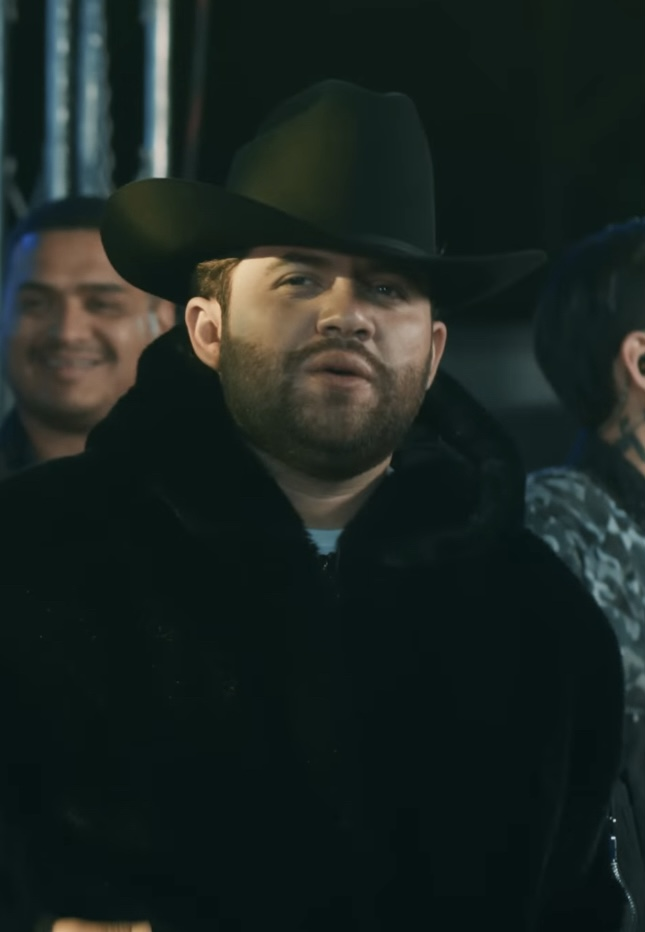
- Conriquez in 2023
- Born: Luis Roberto Conriquez Magdaleno; 28 February 1996 (age 30); Caborca, Sonora, Mexico
- Occupations: Singer; songwriter; musician
- Years active: 2018–present
- Children: 3
- Musical career
- Genres: Regional Mexican; Latin urban
- Instrument: Vocals
- Label: Kartel Music

Luis Roberto Conriquez Magdaleno (born February 28, 1996), known as Luis R. Conriquez, is a Mexican singer-songwriter of regional Mexican music who specializes in corridos bélicos. He would rise to prominence in 2023 for collaborating with Mexican band La Adictiva and fellow singer Peso Pluma, on the singles "JGL" and "Siempre Pendientes", respectively. Since then, he has also recorded and released some songs in the Latin urban genre.

== Life and career ==
=== 1998–2019: Early life and career beginnings ===
Luis Roberto Conriquez was born in Caborca, Sonora, Mexico on 28 February 1996. In 2018, after quitting his full-time job at a gas station, Conriquez focused on writing songs, where he later signed to the independent label Kartel Music and released his debut album Mis Inicios, which contained the collaborative track "Mi Apodo El 20" with Los Minis de Caborca.

In 2019, Conriquez would release the single "El Buho", which eventually reached the top 10 on the US Regional Mexican Airplay chart. He would also release three albums that year; his second and third studio albums Pocos Pero Locos and Aquí Sequimos de Pie, and the compilation album Corridos 2019, Vol. 2.

=== 2020–2023: Rise to prominence ===
In 2022, Conriquez collaborated with La Adictiva on "JGL", which peaked atop the US Regional Mexican Airplay chart, in its fourth week. Lyrically, the song praises drug lord Joaquín "El Chapo" Guzmán. In August 2022, Conriquez would collaborate with Peso Pluma on "Siempre Pendientes", which was commercially successful. The song and its accompanied music video attained controversy; the song's lyrics mainly praised drug lord Joaquín "El Chapo" Guzmán, while its music video, directed by Cesar Acosta, was removed from YouTube three days later due to public outrage, with over 2 million views in its first 24 hours on the platform. Following the single's release, Conriquez would collaborate with Marca Registrada on "Puro Campeón".

In the beginning of 2023, Conriquez released a cover of Marco Antonio Solís' "Si Tú Te Fueras de Mí" and would collaborate with Grupo Firme on "Un Amor Como Este" in February 2023. He eventually collaborated with American singer Nicky Jam on "Como el Viento", which was released in March 2023 and was recorded in Miami during the week of the Premio Lo Nuestro 2023. Throughout the summer of 2023, Conriquez would release several songs with other artists, which include "Viejo Lobo" with Natanael Cano, "Su Casa" with Peso Pluma, "La 701" with Tito Double P, and "Dembow Bélico" with Tito Double P and Joel de la P. In October 2023, Conriquez was seen with J Balvin during Canelo Álvarez's afterparty, where it was rumoured that both would collaborate. That same month, he would announce his first album since 2022, Corridos Bélicos, Vol. IV, where Peso Pluma and Natanael Cano would appear. He would promote the album by releasing the single "Sin Tanto Royo" with Tito Double P. In November 2023, he would collaborate with Los Dareyes de la Sierra and Edgardo Nuñez on the dembow track "De Fresa y Coco". He would also release a collaboration with Colombian singer Ryan Castro that same month, titled "Plebita". In December, he would release "Te Quiero Así", which was a tribute to Valentín Elizalde, as well as the reveal of the tracklist for Corridos Bélicos, Vol. IV.

=== 2024: Corridos Bélicos, Vol. IV and hit singles ===
After releasing Corridos Bélicos, Vol. IV in the beginning of 2024, which contains guest appearances from Peso Pluma, Gabito Ballesteros, among others, Conriquez would release more singles and eventually released the hit single "Si No Quieres No" with fellow singer-songwriter Netón Vega. The usage of his single "Me Pongo Belikon" with Máxima Ventaja, which he released after the hit single, by Canelo Alvárez led to it going viral on TikTok. Conriquez released a posthumous single with Joan Sebastian titled "De Ellas" in April 2024, and would then experiment further with dembow, by releasing the single "Que Se Cuide" with fellow singer Joel de la P and Dominican urban rapper Chimbala. His single with Vega "Si No Quieres No" debuted at number 86 on the Billboard Hot 100, making it both singers' first entry on the chart.

2025-Present:

== Artistry ==
Conriquez specializes in a genre called corridos bélicos, which is a music style similar to corridos tumbados and instead contains lyrical elements of a narcocorrido; he is often referred as the pioneer of the genre and is nicknamed "El Rey de Corridos Bélicos". Lyrics in his songs include themes revolving around heartbreak or everyday life, but received attention for his hit single "JGL" with La Adictiva, where the song title is a reference to Mexican drug lord Joaquín "El Chapo" Guzmán and its lyrics containing a reference to Los Chapitos of the Sinaloa Cartel. He eventually started experimenting with dembow music with the release of his single "Dembow Bélico" with Tito Double P and Joel de la P, which also contained elements of a corrido. He has cited Gerardo Ortíz and Larry Hernández as inspirations for his music and has since collaborated with both artists.

== Discography ==
=== Charted albums ===
- Corridos Bélicos, Vol. IV (2024) – No. 36 US Billboard 200

=== Singles ===
List of singles, with selected chart positions, certifications and album name
Title	Year	Peak chart positions				Certifications	Album
Title	Year	MEX	US	US Latin	WW	Certifications	Album
"El Buho"	2019	—	—	19	—	RIAA: 2× Platinum (Latin)	Corridos Bélicos
"Me Metí en el Ruedo"	2020	—	—	18	—	RIAA: Gold (Latin)	Corridos Bélicos, Vol. 2
"Los Mire con Talento" (with Fuerza Regida and Calle 24)	2021	—	—	24	—		Del Barrio Hasta Aquí, Vol. 2
"JGL" (with La Adictiva)	2022	12	— (Note: "JGL" did not enter the Billboard Hot 100, but peaked at number 12 on the Bubbling Under Hot 100 chart.)	18	—	AMPROFON: 3× Platinum	Non-album singles
"Siempre Pendientes" (with Peso Pluma)	2022	9	— (Note: "Siempre Pendientes" did not enter the Billboard Hot 100, but peaked at number 11 on the Bubbling Under Hot 100 chart.)	27	174	AMPROFON: 4× Platinum; RIAA: 5× Platinum (Latin)	Non-album singles
"Puro Campeón" (with Grupo Marca Registrada)	2022	25	—	28	—		Don't Stop the Magic
"El Gavilán" (with Tony Aguirre and Peso Pluma)	2022	15	—	34	—	RIAA: Platinum (Latin)	Non-album singles
"Dembow Bélico" (with Tito Double P and Joel de la P)	2023	15	—	35	—	RIAA: 6× Platinum (Latin)	Non-album singles
"Sin Tanto Royo" (with Tito Double P)	2023	—	—	35	—		Corridos Bélicos, Vol. IV
"Si No Quieres No" (with Netón Vega)	2024	1	53	2	34	RIAA: 3× Platinum (Latin)	Non-album singles
"Que Se Cuide" (with Joel de la P and Chimbala)	2024	11	—	16	—		Non-album singles
"Martes 13"	2024	—	—	20	—		Non-album singles
"Bandida" (with Peso Pluma)	2025	—	— (Note: "Bandida" did not enter the Billboard Hot 100, but peaked at number 6 on the Bubbling Under Hot 100 chart.)	26	129		Non-album singles
"Chula Vente" (with Netón Vega and Fuerza Regida)	2025	—	— (Note: "Chula Vente" did not enter the Billboard Hot 100, but peaked at number 9 on the Bubbling Under Hot 100 chart.)	9	62		Non-album singles

=== Other charted and certified songs ===
List of songs, with selected chart positions, certifications and album name
Title	Year	Peak chart positions		Certifications	Album
Title	Year	US Bub.	US Latin	Certifications	Album
"Los Botones Azules" (with Junior H)	2021	—	20	AMPROFON: Diamond; RIAA: 11× Platinum (Latin)	Mi Vida en un Cigarro 2
"Así Lo Quiso Dios" (with Eslabón Armado)	2023	6	24		Desvelado
"Su Casa" (with Peso Pluma)	2023	15	29		Génesis
"Pixelados" (with Peso Pluma)	2024	11	18		Corridos Bélicos, Vol. IV
"GTA" (with Jasiel Nuñez)	2024	—	43		Corridos Bélicos, Vol. IV (Deluxe)
"Sr. Smith" (with Peso Pluma)	2024	—	22		Éxodo
"CDN" (with Netón Vega)	2025	—	42		Mi Vida Mi Muerte
