= List of Billboard Latin Rhythm Airplay number ones of 2024 =

The Billboard Latin Rhythm Airplay is a chart that ranks the best-performing Spanish-language Latin rhythm singles in the United States. Published by Billboard magazine, the data is compiled by Nielsen SoundScan based collectively on each single's weekly airplay.

== Chart history ==
Key
†	Indicates number 1 on Billboard's year-end Latin rhythm chart

Issue date	Song	Artist	Ref.
January 6	"Bubalu"	Feid and Rema	
January 13	"Bubalu"	Feid and Rema	
January 20	"Bubalu"	Feid and Rema	
January 27	"Monaco"	Bad Bunny	
February 3	"Borracho y Loco"	Yandel and Myke Towers	
February 10	"Borracho y Loco"	Yandel and Myke Towers	
February 17	"Borracho y Loco"	Yandel and Myke Towers	
February 24	"La Falda"	Myke Towers	
March 2	"Qlona"	Karol G and Peso Pluma	
March 9	"Qlona"	Karol G and Peso Pluma	
March 16	"Qlona"	Karol G and Peso Pluma	
March 23	"Qlona"	Karol G and Peso Pluma	
March 30	"Baccarat"	Ozuna	
April 6	"Qlona"	Karol G and Peso Pluma	
April 13	"Perro Negro" †	Bad Bunny and Feid	
April 20	"Perro Negro" †	Bad Bunny and Feid	
April 27	"Luna"	Feid and ATL Jacob	
May 4	"Luna"	Feid and ATL Jacob	
May 11	"Luna"	Feid and ATL Jacob	
May 18	"Luna"	Feid and ATL Jacob	
May 25	"Perro Negro" †	Bad Bunny and Feid	
June 1	"Si Sabe Ferxxo"	Blessd and Feid	
June 8	"Perro Negro" †	Bad Bunny and Feid	
June 15	"Perro Negro" †	Bad Bunny and Feid	
June 22	"Perro Negro" †	Bad Bunny and Feid	
June 29	"Perro Negro" †	Bad Bunny and Feid	
July 6	"Perro Negro" †	Bad Bunny and Feid	
July 13	"Perro Negro" †	Bad Bunny and Feid	
July 20	"Mamasota"	Manuel Turizo and Yandel	
July 27	"Es Normal"	Venesti	
August 3	"Es Normal"	Venesti	
August 10	"Mamasota"	Manuel Turizo and Yandel	
August 17	"Adivino"	Myke Towers and Bad Bunny	
August 24	"Adivino"	Myke Towers and Bad Bunny	
August 31	"Adivino"	Myke Towers and Bad Bunny	
September 7	"Adivino"	Myke Towers and Bad Bunny	
September 14	"Brickell"	Feid and Yandel	
September 21	"Brickell"	Feid and Yandel	
September 28	"Brickell"	Feid and Yandel	
October 5	"Brickell"	Feid and Yandel	
October 12	"Polvo de Tu Vida"	J Balvin and Chencho Corleone	
October 19	"Polvo de Tu Vida"	J Balvin and Chencho Corleone	
October 26	"Sorry 4 That Much"	Feid	
November 2	"Ohnana"	Kapo	
November 9	"Mírame"	Blessd and Ovy on the Drums	
November 16	"Ohnana"	Kapo	
November 23	"Ohnana"	Kapo	
November 30	"Ohnana"	Kapo	
December 7	"Ohnana"	Kapo	
December 14	"Ohnana"	Kapo	
December 21	"Ohnana"	Kapo	
December 28	"Ohnana"	Kapo	
