= 2024 Billboard Latin Music Awards =

Latin music awards ceremony

31st Billboard Latin Music Awards
- Date: October 20, 2024
- Site: Fillmore Miami Beach
- Hosted by: Carmen Villalobos & Danilo Carrera

Highlights
- Most awards: Karol G (8)
- Most nominations: Karol G (17)

Television coverage
- Network: Telemundo, Universo, Peacock
- Ratings: 1.8 million

The 31st Billboard Latin Music Awards presented by Billboard to honor the most popular albums, songs and performers in Latin music were held in Miami on October 20, 2024.

The ceremony was broadcast on Telemundo, Universo and streaming service Peacock. The nominations were announced on September 12, 2024, along with the host city.

== Presenters ==
- Alexa Martín and Isabella Castillo – presented Duo/Group Hot Latin Songs Artist of the Year
- Paola Jara and Mau y Ricky – presented New Artist of the Year
- Carmen Villalobos and Danilo Carrera – introduced Yandel
- Yahritza y su Esencia – presented Latin Pop Song of the Year
- Danilo Carrera – introduced María Becerra and Gloria Trevi
- Ana Mena – presented Lifetime Achievement Award to Alejandro Sanz
- Jacqueline Bracamontes and Lupillo Rivera – presented Latin Pop Album of the Year
- Carmen Villalobos – introduced Grupo Niche
- Carmen Villalobos - presented Hall of Fame Award to Pepe Aguilar
- Danilo Carrera – introduced Prince Royce and Gabito Ballesteros
- Venesti and Danna – presented Latin Rhythm Artist of the Year, Duo or Group
- Carmen Villalobos and Danilo Carrera – introduced Fuerza Regida
- María Becerra – introduced J Balvin
- Maluma – presented Spirit of Hope award to J Balvin
- Pipe Bueno and Kali Uchis – presented Tropical Song of the Year
- Carmen Villalobos – introduced Xavi
- Majo Aguilar and Camila Fernández – presented Regional Mexican Album of the Year
- Carmen Villalobos and Danilo Carrera – introduced Chencho Corleone
- Carmen Villalobos and Danilo Carrera – introduced Pepe Aguilar
- Maffio and Alicia Machado – presented Global 200 Latin Song of the Year
- Carmen Villalobos and Danilo Carrera – introduced Proyecto Uno

== Performers ==
List of performers at the 31st Billboard Latin Music Awards
Artist(s)	Song(s)
Luis Alfonso	"Tequila con Cerveza" "Chismofilia"
Yandel	"Afro" "Hablame Claro"
María Becerra; Gloria Trevi	"Borracha"
Grupo Niche	"Cali Pachanguero"
Prince Royce; Gabito Ballesteros	"Cosas de la Peda"
Fuerza Regida	"Tú Name" "Nel"
J Balvin	"Cosa De Locos"
Xavi	"La Diabla"
Chencho Corleone	"Lo Caro y Lo Bueno"
Pepe Aguilar	"Recuérdame Bonito" "Por Mujeres Como Tú" "Prometiste" "Cuídamela Bien"
Proyecto Uno	"El Tiburón"

== Winners and nominees ==
The nominations were announced on September 12, 2024, with Colombian singer Karol G leading with 17, followed by Bad Bunny and Peso Pluma with 15 each, Feid, with 11, Fuerza Regida and Junior H with 8 each.

Winners appear first and highlighted in bold.

Artist of the Year	New Artist of the Year
**Bad Bunny**; Fuerza Regida; Junior H; Karol G; Peso Pluma	**Xavi**; Gabito Ballesteros; Óscar Maydon; Tito Double P; Young Miko
Tour of the Year	Crossover Artist of the Year
**Mañana Será Bonito Tour — Karol G**; Cerrando Ciclos — Aventura; Most Wanted Tour — Bad Bunny; Luis Miguel Tour 2023-24 — Luis Miguel; Soy Rebelde Tour — RBD	**ATL Jacob**; Cardi B; Marshmello; Rema; Tiësto
Global 200 Latin Artist of the Year	Global 200 Latin Song of the Year
**Karol G**; Bad Bunny; Feid; Peso Pluma; Xavi; Diego Olivera	**FloyyMenor & Cris MJ – Gata Only**; Bad Bunny & Feid – Perro Negro; Feid & ATL Jacob – Luna; Karol G & Peso Pluma – Qlona; Myke Towers – Lala
Hot Latin Song of the Year	Hot Latin Song of the Year, Vocal Event
**Karol G & Peso Pluma – Qlona**; Bad Bunny – Monaco; Bad Bunny & Feid – Perro Negro; FloyyMenor & Cris MJ – Gata Only; Xavi – La Diabla	**Karol G & Peso Pluma – Qlona**; Bad Bunny & Feid – Perro Negro; FloyyMenor & Cris MJ – Gata Only; Fuerza Regida & Marshmello – Harley Quinn; Peso Pluma, Gabito Ballesteros & Junior H – Lady Gaga
Hot Latin Songs Artist of the Year, Male	Hot Latin Songs Artist of the Year, Female
**Peso Pluma**; Bad Bunny; Feid; Junior H; Xavi	**Karol G**; Anitta; Kali Uchis; Shakira; Young Miko
Duo/Group Hot Latin Songs Artist of the Year	Hot Latin Songs Label of the Year
**Fuerza Regida**; Eslabon Armado; Grupo Firme; Grupo Frontera; Julión Álvarez y Su Norteño Banda	**Interscope Capitol Labels Group**; Double P; Rimas; Sony Music Latin; Warner Latina
Sales Song of the Year	Streaming Song of the Year
**Bad Bunny – Monaco**; Karol G – Mi Ex Tenía Razón; Karol G – Si Antes Te Hubiera Conocido; Karol G & Peso Pluma – Qlona; Xavi – La Diabla	**Karol G & Peso Pluma – Qlona**; Bad Bunny & Feid – Perro Negro; Calle 24, Chino Pacas & Fuerza Regida – Qué Onda; Peso Pluma, Gabito Ballesteros & Junior H – Lady Gaga; Xavi – La Diabla
Airplay Song of the Year	Airplay Label of the Year
**Karol G – Mi Ex Tenía Razón**; Bad Bunny & Feid – Perro Negro; Karol G & Peso Pluma – Qlona; Myke Towers – La Falda; Myke Towers – Lala	**Sony Music Latin**; Interscope Capitol Labels Group; Rimas; Universal Music Latin Entertainment; Warner Latina
Top Latin Album of the Year	Top Latin Albums Artist of the Year, Duo/Group
**Bad Bunny – Nadie Sabe Lo Que Va a Pasar Mañana**; Fuerza Regida – Pa Las Baby's y Belikeada; Grupo Frontera – El Comienzo; Junior H – $ad Boyz 4 Life II; Karol G – Mañana Será Bonito (Bichota Season)	**Fuerza Regida**; Aventura; Eslabon Armado; Grupo Frontera; Grupo Marca Registrada
Top Latin Albums Artist of the Year, Male	Top Latin Albums Artist of the Year, Female
**Bad Bunny**; Feid; Junior H; Peso Pluma; Rauw Alejandro	**Karol G**; Becky G; Kali Uchis; Shakira; Young Miko
Top Latin Albums Label of the Year
**Sony Music Latin**; Double P; Interscope Capitol Labels Group; Rimas; Universal Music Latin Entertainment
Latin Pop Artist of the Year	Latin Pop Duo/Group of the Year
**Shakira**; Enrique Iglesias; Kali Uchis; Luis Fonsi; Sebastián Yatra	**Maná**; Camila; La Oreja de Van Gogh; Piso 21; Reik
Latin Pop Song of the Year	Latin Pop Album of the Year
**Venesti, Nacho & Maffio – No Es Normal**; Danny Ocean – Amor; Maná & Eden Muñoz – Amor Clandestino; Piso 21 & Wisin – La Misión; Reik – Abril	**Kali Uchis – Orquídeas**; Chayanne – Bailemos Otra Vez; Jay Wheeler – Música Buena Para Días Malos; Kany García – García; Shakira – Las Mujeres Ya No Lloran
Latin Pop Airplay Label of the Year	Latin Pop Albums Label of the Year
**Sony Music Latin**; AP Global; Interscope Capitol Label Group; Universal Music Latin Entertainment; Warner Latina	**Universal Music Latin Entertainment**; Columbia; Interscope Capitol Labels Group; Sony Music Latin; Warner Latina
Tropical Artist of the Year, Solo	Tropical Artist of the Year, Duo or Group
**Romeo Santos**; Juan Luis Guerra; Luis Figueroa; Marc Anthony; Prince Royce	**Aventura**; Gente de Zona; Grupo Niche; La Sonora Dinamita; Monchy & Alexandra
Tropical Song of the Year	Tropical Album of the Year
**Prince Royce & Gabito Ballesteros - Cosas de la Peda**; Luis Figueroa – Bandido; Marc Anthony – Punta Cana; Myke Towers – La Capi; Víctor Manuelle & Frankie Ruiz – Otra Noche Más	**Camilo — Cuatro**; Aventura — Generation Next; Marc Anthony — Muevense; Prince Royce — Llamada Perdida
Tropical Songs Airplay Label of the Year	Tropical Albums Label of the Year
**Sony Music Latin**; Interscope Capitol Label Group; Magnus; Rimas; Warner Latina	**Sony Music Latin**; Discos Fuentes; The Orchard; Universal Music Enterprises; Universal Music Latin Entertainment
Regional Mexican Artist of the Year, Solo	Regional Mexican Artist of the Year, Duo or Group
**Peso Pluma**; Carin León; Iván Cornejo; Junior H; Natanael Cano	**Fuerza Regida**; Eslabon Armado; Grupo Firme; Grupo Frontera; Julión Álvarez y Su Norteño Banda
Regional Mexican Song of the Year	Regional Mexican Album of the Year
**Julión Álvarez y Su Norteño Banda – Buscándole a la Suerte**; Alejandro Fernández – Difícil Tu Caso; Banda MS – Tu Perfume; Banda El Recodo de Cruz Lizárraga – Dios Bendiga Nuestro Amor; Banda Los Recoditos – Vas a Querer Volver	**Fuerza Regida – Pa Las Baby's y Belikeada**; Grupo Frontera – El Comienzo; Junior H – $ad Boyz 4 Life II; Natanael Cano – Nata Montana; Peso Pluma – Éxodo
Regional Mexican Airplay Label of the Year	Regional Mexican Albums Label of the Year
**Universal Music Latin Entertainment**; Afinarte; Azteca; Grupo Frontera; Sony Music Latin	**Sony Music Latin**; Double P; Grupo Frontera; Universal Music Latin Entertainment; Warner Latina
Latin Rhythm Artist of the Year, Solo	Latin Rhythm Artist of the Year, Duo or Group
**Bad Bunny**; Feid; Karol G; Myke Towers; Rauw Alejandro	**Wisin & Yandel**; Baby Rasta & Gringo; Jowell & Randy; Mambo Kingz; Zion & Lennox
Latin Rhythm Song of the Year	Latin Rhythm Album of the Year
**Daddy Yankee – Bonita**; Aaantonio – El Hotel; Natti Natasha – Ya No Te Extraño; Venesti – Umaye; Wisin & Mora – Bien Loco	**Bad Bunny – Nadie Sabe Lo Que Va a Pasar Mañana**; Feid – Ferxxocalipsis; Karol G – Mañana Será Bonito (Bichota Season); Rauw Alejandro – Playa Saturno; Tainy – Data
Latin Rhythm Airplay Label of the Year	Latin Rhythm Albums Label of the Year
**Sony Music Latin**; Interscope Capitol Labels Group; Rimas; Universal Music Latin Entertainment; Warner Latina	**Rimas**; Interscope Capitol Labels Group; Neon 16; Sony Music Latin; Universal Music Latin Entertainment
Songwriter of the Year	Producer of the Year
**Peso Pluma**; Alexis Armando Fierro Román; Edgar Barrera; JOP; Xavi	**Ernesto 'Neto' Fernández**; Edgar Barrera; JOP; MAG; Ovy on the Drums
Publisher of the Year	Publishing Corporation of the Year
**Street Mob Publishing, BMI**; Double P Publishing, BMI; Prajin Music Publishing, BMI; Warner-Tamerlane Publishing Corp, BMI; Universal Music, Inc., ASCAP	**Sony Music Publishing**; Downtown Music Publishing; Kobalt Music; Universal Music; Warner Chappell Music
Hall of Fame Award
Pepe Aguilar
Lifetime Achievement Award
Alejandro Sanz
Spirit of Hope
J Balvin
