= Pailita =

Chilean singer-songwriter (born 2000)

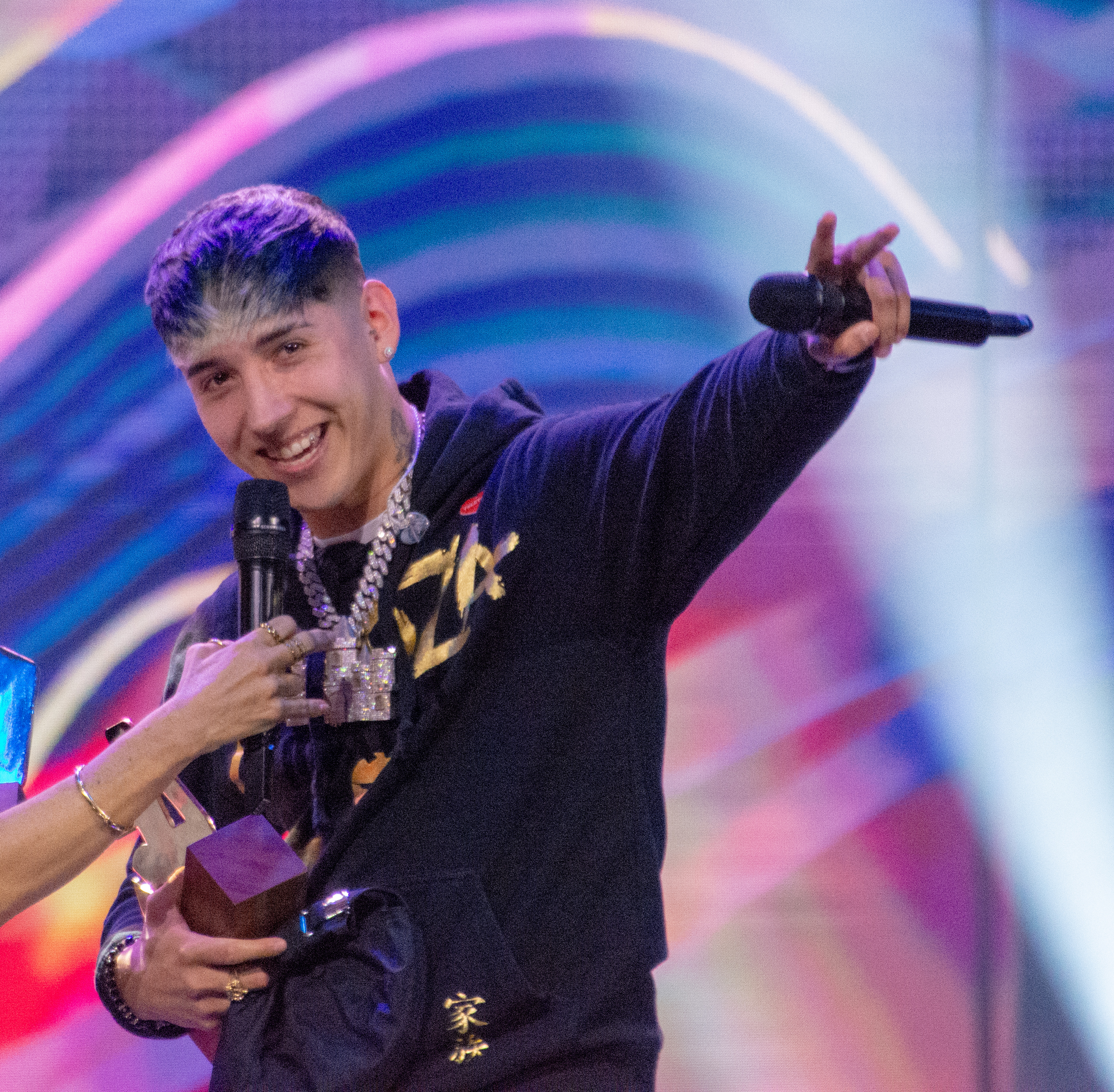
- Pailita in 2023

Background information
- Born: Carlos Javier Rain Pailacheo; 4 February 2000 (age 26); Punta Arenas, Chile
- Genres: Reggaeton; Latin trap
- Occupations: Rapper; singer; songwriter
- Years active: 2019–present
- Label: Rimas

Carlos Javier Rain Pailacheo (born 4 February 2000), known professionally as Pailita, is a Chilean singer, rapper and songwriter.

He is recognized for songs such as "Dime tú" with Cris MJ, or "Na na na". He has also achieved levels of international insertion by positioning himself in No. 1 of the Billboard Global 200 list.

== Early life and education ==
Rain was born in Punta Arenas on 4 February 2000, in the center of a family of Mapuche descent. He completed his primary education studies at the Escuela España and his secondary education at the Instituto Don Bosco. Rain represented the Magallanes Region in the Araucanía Binational Games in the discipline of football, a sport that he had to retire due to a heart condition for which he had to undergo surgery in Santiago. After having to retire from football, he dedicated himself completely to music. Later, he graduated as a technician in Industrial Electricity at the Inacap Institute in Punta Arenas.

== Musical career ==
Pailita began to develop his first songs and freestyle music recordings on digital platforms. Motivated by this, in 2021, he left his family and friends to travel to Santiago in search of being able to formalize a musical career. Accordingly, Pailita managed to collaborate with Marcianeke in the making of the song "Dímelo Ma", whose popularity led him to fame. This gave him a basis for the single "HOOKA" to be the consecration of his recognition.

In November 2022, Pailita performed at that year's Teletón with Polimá Westcoast, presenting his hits "Na Na Na" and "Ultra solo", for which he was applauded at the Estadio Nacional. Seven days later, and in that same venue, he opened for Puerto Rican singer Bad Bunny. Two days before Christmas 2022, Pailita canceled his participation in the Musa Awards at the last minute to go help the victims of a devastating forest fire in Viña del Mar. There he cooperated by unloading trucks, and motivating other national singers to be present and help the victims. In January 2023, he reached number #1 on Spotify with the song "Llámame Bebé" with Cris MJ and Young Cister, being the first Chilean song in history to achieve such a position.

== Social activism ==
On 15 May 2022, Pailita fulfilled his promise to return as an established artist to Punta Arenas and perform a free concert for his people. This generated a turnout of 14,000 people at the María Behety Park on the shores of the Strait of Magellan, an event to which he invited his friend, Polimá Westcoast.

On 7 December 2022, Pailita was named "Illustrious Citizen" of his native Punta Arenas. After that, he expressed that one of his greatest dreams is to be able to create a center for crime prevention and rehabilitation for alcohol and drug use.

== Discography ==
=== Studio albums ===
Year	Title
2024	De la zona más extrema

=== EPs ===
Year	Title
2022	Soñando Despierto

=== Singles ===
==== As lead artist ====
Year	Title
2020	"No Fue Suerte"
2020	"Get Me Down" (with Lewis Somes)
2020	"Mi Nena!"
2020	"Subiendo (remix)" (with Matii Kidd)
2020	"Freestyle Session"
2020	"Freestyle Session 2"
2020	"Freestyle Session 3"
2021	"My Life" (with Melora1n)
2021	"El Castii" (with Amolette, Keyshita and danny)
2021	"Farandulera" (with Marcianeke, Tunechikidd)
2021	"Exo" (with Lion Moreno, Melora1n)
2021	"Hooka"
2021	"Me la Busco"
2021	"Noche Buena"
2022	"Dime Tú" (with Cris Mj)
2022	"Par De Veces"
2022	"Thomas Contreras"
2022	"Más de una Vez"
2022	"Na Na Na"
2022	"Caminemos de la Mano" (with Young Cister)
2022	"Parcera"
2022	"Na Na Na (Remix)" (with El Jordan 23, Noriel and Pablo Chill-E)
2022	"Vuelve"
2022	"Llámame Bebé" (with Young Cister, Cris Mj)
2022	"Salgo"
2022	"Nadie Como Tú"
2022	"Por Qué No Te Decides"
2022	"Panty" (with Standly)
2023	"Si Tú Supieras" (with De la Ghetto)
2023	"Venga Pa' Ca"
2023	"Viral" (with AK4:20)
2023	"Me Acordé De Ti"
2023	"Ponte De Espalda" (with Cris Mj)
2023	"Distinta"
2023	"Bikini" (with Marcianeke)
2023	"Lento"
2023	"Bailoteo"
2024	"Bendito" (from Baby Bandito: La Serie)
2024	"Sentimientos"
2024	"Casualidad" (with Kidd Voodoo)
2024	"After Party" (with Polimá Westcoast and Young Cister)
2024	"No Me Mire Así"
2024	"Europea"
2024	"No Lo Son"
2024	"Buscándola" (with Pablo Chill-E)
2024	"Noche De Miel"
2024	"Desnúdate" (with Juanka)
2024	"Se Quitó Del Love"
2024	"Explotao" (with Brray and Nio García)
2024	"Amigos" (with Kevin Roldán)
2024	"Hasta Que Salga El Sol" (with Juhn)
2024	"Me Dijeron"
2024	"Cinturita" (with Justin Quiles)
2024	"No Cooperamos" (with El Jordan 23, Cris Mj and Galee Galee)
2024	"Los Peine" (with Ithan NY and Piero 47)
2024	"Noche Buena 2"

== Awards and nominations ==
Year	Award	Category	Recipient(s) and nominee(s)	Result	Ref.
2021	Musa Awards	Song of the Year	"Dímelo Má" (with Marcianeke)	Won	
2022	Premios Pulsar	Best Song of the Year	"Dímelo Má" (with Marcianeke)	Nominated	
2022	Musa Awards	Urban Artist	Himself	Won	
2022	Musa Awards	Video Clip of the Year	«Ultra Solo (Remix)" (with Polimá Westcoast, Paloma Mami, Feid, De la Ghetto)	Nominated	
2022	Musa Awards	Collaboration of the Year	«Ultra Solo» (with Polimá Westcoast)	Won	
2022	Musa Awards	Song of the Year	«Ultra Solo» (with Polimá Westcoast)	Won	
2022	Premios la Junta	Best Mambo Song	"Phillie & Botella (Remix)" (with Nicko Og, Simon La Letra, Standly)	Won	
2022	Premios la Junta	Best Reggaeton Song	"Ultra Solo" (with Polimá Westcoast)	Nominated	
2022	Premios la Junta	Best Reggaeton Artist	Himself	Nominated	
2022	Premios la Junta	Song of the Year	"Ultra Solo (Remix)" (with Polimá Westcoast, Paloma Mami, Feid, De la Ghetto)	Won	
2022	Premios la Junta	Artist of the Year	Himself	Won	
