= Ferxxocalipsis World Tour =

2024 concert tour by Feid

- Tour by Feid
- Promotional poster for the tour
- Associated albums: Mor, No Le Temas a la Oscuridad; Ferxxocalipsis
- Start date: April 24, 2024
- End date: December 8, 2024
- No. of shows: 46

The Ferxxocalipsis World Tour was a headlining concert tour by Colombian singer Feid, launched in support of his sixth studio album Mor, No Le Temas a la Oscuridad (2023) and his third EP Ferxxocalipsis. The arena-stadium tour began on April 24, 2024, in Sacramento, United States, and ended on 8 December 2024, in Medellín, Colombia.

== Setlist ==
This set list is representative of the show on April 24, 2024, in Sacramento. It is not representative of all of the concerts of the tour.

1. "Intro Ferxxo"
2. "Alakran"
3. "50 Palos"
4. "Chimbita"
5. "Lady Mi Amor"
6. "Castigo"
7. "Bubablu"
8. "Ferxxo 151"
9. "Ultra Solo"
10. "Fumeteo"
11. "Perro Negro"
12. "Cual es esa"
13. "El cielo"
14. "La Inocente"
15. "Ferxxo 30"
16. "Prohibidox"
17. "Porfa"
18. "Esquirla"
19. "Mojando Asientos"
20. "Remix Exclusivo"
21. "Ferxxo Edition"
22. "X19X"
23. "Feliz Cumpleaños Ferxxo"
24. "Monastery"
25. "Luces de Tecno"
26. "Ey Chory"
27. "Le pido a Dios"
28. "Románticos de Lunes"
29. "Normal"
30. "Ferxxo 100"
31. "Yandel 150"
32. "Hey MOr"
33. "Classy 101"
34. "Chorrito pa las animas"
35. "Luna"

== Tour Dates ==
Date (2024)	City	Country	Venue	Attendance	Revenue
North America
April 24	Sacramento	United States	Golden 1 Center	—	—
April 27	Inglewood	United States	The Forum	—	—
May 1	San José	United States	SAP Center	—	—
May 3	Thousand Palms	United States	Acrisure Arena	—	—
May 4	San Diego	United States	Pechanga Arena	—	—
May 10	Las Vegas	United States	Michelob Ultra Arena	—	—
May 11	Phoenix	United States	Footprint Center	—	—
May 15	Salt Lake City	United States	Delta Center	—	—
May 18	Tulsa	United States	BOK Center	—	—
May 19	Fort Worth	United States	Dickies Arena	—	—
May 22	Edinburg	United States	Bert Ogden Arena	—	—
May 24	Houston	United States	Toyota Center	—	—
May 25	Austin	United States	Moody Center	—	—
May 27	Nashville	United States	Bridgestone Arena	—	—
May 30	Chicago	United States	United Center	—	—
June 1	Montreal	Canada	Centre Bell	—	—
June 2	Toronto	Canada	Scotiabank Arena	—	—
June 6	Philadelphia	United States	Wells Fargo Center	—	—
June 7	Newark	United States	Prudential Center	—	—
June 9	Hartford	United States	XL Center	—	—
June 13	Boston	United States	TD Garden	—	—
June 16	New York City	United States	Madison Square Garden	—	—
June 20	Washington D. C.	United States	Capital One Arena	—	—
June 21	Greensboro	United States	Greensboro Coliseum	—	—
June 23	Duluth	United States	Gas South Arena	—	—
June 28	Orlando	United States	Kia Center	—	—
July 6	Miami	United States	Hard Rock Stadium	—	—
Europe
July 27	Madrid	Spain	Estadio Metropolitano	—	—
Latin America
August 20	Mexico City	Mexico	Estadio GNP Seguros	—	—
August 21	Mexico City	Mexico	Estadio GNP Seguros	—	—
August 25	Zapopan (Note: Labeled as Guadalajara in promotional material.)	Mexico	Estadio Tres de Marzo	—	—
August 28	Monterrey	Mexico	Estadio Banorte	—	—
September 4	Guatemala City	Guatemala	Explanada Cardales de Cayala	—	—
September 8	San Salvador	El Salvador	Estadio Jorge "El Mágico" González	—	—
September 12	Tegucigalpa	Honduras	Estadio Chochi Sosa	—	—
September 15	San José	Costa Rica	Estadio Nacional	—	—
October 18	San Juan	Puerto Rico	Coliseo de Puerto Rico	—	—
November 19	Quito	Ecuador	Estadio Olímpico Atahualpa	—	—
November 22	Lima	Perú	Estadio San Marcos	—	—
November 26	Santiago	Chile	Estadio Monumental	—	—
November 29	Bogotá	Colombia	Coliseo MedPlus	—	—
November 30	Bogotá	Colombia	Coliseo MedPlus	—	—
December 1	Bogotá	Colombia	Coliseo MedPlus	—	—
December 6	Medellín	Colombia	Estadio Atanasio Girardot	—	—
December 7	Medellín	Colombia	Estadio Atanasio Girardot	—	—
December 8	Medellín	Colombia	Estadio Atanasio Girardot	—	—

== Cancelled shows ==
List of cancelled concerts, showing date, city, country, venue, and reason for cancellation
Date	City	Country	Venue	Reason
November 9, 2024	Santo Domingo	Dominican Republic	Estadio Olimipico Felix Sanchez	Unknown
