= 2021 Premios Juventud =

- Date: July 22, 2021
- Location: Watsco Center, Coral Gables, Florida
- Country: United States
- Hosted by: Alejandra Espinoza, Chiquis and Sebastian Yatra

Highlights
- Most awards: Karol G (6)
- Most nominations: Karol G, Camilo
- Website: Official page

Television/radio coverage
- Network: Univision
- Viewership: 1.94 million

The 2021 Premios Juventud ceremony took place July 22, 2021. Univision broadcast the show live from the Watsco Center, with Alejandra Espinoza hosting the event. Premios Juventud aims to inspire, motivate and empower Latino youth to become leaders for change. The awards celebrate the current trends in pop culture, music, digital, fashion, television and social media. Daddy Yankee was honored with the "Agent Of Change" award.

== Performers ==
Artist(s)	Song(s)
N'Klabe Ft. Farina & La Tribu de Abrante	"Pa'lante y Pa'tras"
Natti Natasha Feat. Brray & Nio Garcia	"Philliecito"
Becky G & El Alfa	"Fulanito"
TINI	"Miénteme"
Ricky Martin Ft. Paloma Mami	"Qué Rico Fuera"
Lunay; Chencho Corleone; Anitta	"Vudu" "Todo O Nada"
Gloria Trevi; Guaynaa; Los Ángeles Azules	"Nos Volvimos Locos" "Cumbia a la gente"
CNCO	"To'a La Noche"
Farruko; El Alfa; Nino Freestyle; Alex Rulay; IAmChino	"No Hago Coro" "Si es Trucho es Trucho" "Pepas"
Myke Towers	"Almas Gemelas"
Karol G	"200 Copas"
Tommy Torres	"Marea"
Pepe Aguilar; Ángela Aguilar; Leonardo Aguilar	"La Quiero Igualita" (Leonardo) "Ahí donde me ven" (Ángela) "Traigo Ganas" (Pepe) "Viva México" (Pepe, Ángela & Leonardo)
Malena Burke; Lena Burke; Yailenys Pérez; Joncien	"Libertad"
Gente De Zona & Yotuel Romero	"Patria Y Vida"
Grupo Firme Ft. Marca MP	"El Güero"
Jay Wheeler	"Viendo el Techo"
Yeison Jiménez	"Tu Amante"
Kali Uchis	"Telepatía"
Tainy; Yandel	"Deja Vu"
Pitbull; IAmChino; El Alfa; Omar Courtz; Farruko; Anthony Watts; DJWS	"Ten Cuidao" "I Feel Good"
Chino & Nacho	Medley ("Andas En Mi Cabeza" "Me Voy Enamorando" "Mi Niña Bonita" "Queriéndote")
Justin Quiles, Chimbala & Zion & Lennox	"Loco"

== Winners and nominees ==
Winners were revealed on July 22 and are highlighted in bold.

=== The New Generation - Female ===
- **Kali Uchis**
- Chesca
- Daniela Darcourt
- Elena Rose
- La Ross María
- María Becerra
- Nathy Peluso
- Nicki Nicole
- VF7
- Yahaira Plasencia

=== The New Generation - Male ===
- **Jay Wheeler**
- Alex Rose
- Fran Rozzano
- Guaynaa
- Khea
- Llane
- Manny Cruz
- Mati Gómez
- Mora
- Rochy RD

=== The New Generation - Regional Mexican ===
- **Los Dos Carnales**
- Eslabon Armado
- Ingrid Contreras
- Jessi Uribe
- Junior H
- Las Marías
- Los Nuevos Federales
- Marca MP
- Nuevo Elemento
- Yeison Jiménez

=== Best Mariachi Song - Ranchera ===
- '**Dime Cómo Quieres' – Christian Nodal & Ángela Aguilar**
- 'El Alumno' – Joss Favela & Jessi Uribe
- 'El Tiempo No Perdona' – Alex Fernández
- 'No Andes Con Nadie' – Nuevo Elemento
- 'Para No Extrañarte Tanto' – Ana Bárbara
- 'Pobre Corazón' – Ingrid Contreras
- 'Te Olvidé' – Alejandro Fernández
- 'Tu Amante' – Yeison Jiménez
- 'Ya No Insistas Corazón' – Vicente Fernández
- 'Y Si Me Vuelvo a Enamorar' – Jary Franco

=== Best Regional Mexican Song ===
- '**El Envidioso' – Los Dos Carnales**
- 'Barquillero' – Calibre 50
- 'Borracho de Cochera' – El Fantasma
- 'En Otro Canal' – La Fiera de Ojinaga
- 'Otra Borrachera' – Gerardo Ortiz

=== Best Regional Mexican Collaboration ===
- '**El Güero' – Grupo Firme Ft. Marca MP**
- 'Ca... y Vago' – El Fantasma Ft. Los Dos Carnales
- 'Contra Mis Principios' – Lenin Ramírez & Remmy Valenzuela
- 'Somos Los Que Somos' – Los 2 de la S & Banda MS de Sergio Lizárraga
- 'Y la Hice Llorar' – Los Ángeles Azules Ft. Abel Pintos

=== Best Regional Mexican Fusion ===
- '**El Cambio' – Chesca & Grupo Firme**
- '100 Años' – Carlos Rivera, Maluma & Calibre 50
- 'Botella Tras Botella' – Gera MX & Christian Nodal
- 'Cumbia a La Gente' – Guaynaa & Los Ángeles Azules
- 'Que Se Sepa Nuestro Amor' – Mon Laferte & Alejandro Fernández
- 'Tuyo y Mío' – Camilo & Los Dos Carnales

=== Tropical Mix (Song with the Best Tropical Collaboration) ===
- '**Antes Que Salga el Sol' – Natti Natasha & Prince Royce**
- 'Bebé' – Camilo & El Alfa
- 'De Vuelta Pa' La Vuelta' – Daddy Yankee & Marc Anthony
- 'Tú Vas a Tener Que Explicarme' (Remix) – La Ross María & Romeo Santos
- 'Víctimas Las Dos' – Víctor Manuelle & La India

=== Most Powerful Message Video (Video with the best social message) ===
- '**Un Día (One Day)' – J Balvin, Dua Lipa, Bad Bunny & Tainy**
- 'Cuando Estés Aquí' – Pablo Alborán
- 'Cuenta Conmigo' – Mike Bahía, Llane, PJ Sin Suela Ft. Mozart La Para
- 'Girasoles '– Luis Fonsi
- 'Tan Bonita' – Piso 21

=== La Mezcla Perfecta (Song with the Best Collaboration) ===
- '**Relación' (Remix) – Sech, Daddy Yankee, J Balvin, Rosalía & Farruko**
- 'Agua' – Tainy & J Balvin
- 'Caramelo' (Remix) – Ozuna, Karol G & Myke Towers
- 'Chica Ideal' – Sebastián Yatra & Guaynaa
- 'Fútbol y Rumba' – Anuel AA Ft. Enrique Iglesias
- 'Honey Boo' – CNCO & Natti Natasha
- 'Mala Costumbre' – Manuel Turizo & Wisin y Yandel
- 'Mi Niña' (Remix) – Wisin, Myke Towers, Maluma Ft. Anitta & Los Legendarios
- 'Porfa' (Remix) – Feid, Justin Quiles, J Balvin Ft. Maluma, Nicky Jam & Sech
- 'Titanic' – Kany García & Camilo

=== OMG Collaboration (Collaboration with an Anglo artist) ===
- '**Hawái' (Remix) – Maluma & The Weeknd**
- 'Baila Conmigo' – Selena Gomez & Rauw Alejandro
- 'Beautiful Boy' – Karol G, Ludacris & Emilee
- 'Del Mar' – Ozuna, Doja Cat & Sia
- 'Mamacita' – Black Eyed Peas, Ozuna & J Rey Soul
- 'Me Gusta' – Anitta Ft. Cardi B & Myke Towers
- 'TKN' – Rosalía & Travis Scott
- 'Top Gone' – Lil Mosey & Lunay
- 'Un Día (One Day)' – J Balvin, Dua Lipa, Bad Bunny & Tainy
- 'X' – Jonas Brothers Ft. Karol G

=== Viral Track of the Year (Song with the fastest rise in social media) ===
- '**Dákiti' – Bad Bunny & Jhay Cortez**
- 'Con Tus Besos' – Eslabon Armado
- 'De Vuelta Pa' La Vuelta' – Daddy Yankee & Marc Anthony
- 'Dime Cómo Quieres' – Christian Nodal & Ángela Aguilar
- 'El Envidioso' – Los Dos Carnales
- 'Hawái' – Maluma
- 'La Jeepeta' (Remix) – Nio García, Anuel AA, Myke Towers, Brray & Juanka
- 'Relación' (Remix) – Sech, Daddy Yankee, J Balvin, Rosalía & Farruko
- 'Tú' – Carin León
- 'Vida De Rico' – Camilo

=== Male Youth Artist of the Year ===
- **Bad Bunny**
- Camilo
- Christian Nodal
- Daddy Yankee
- El Fantasma
- J Balvin
- Lunay
- Maluma
- Myke Towers
- Prince Royce

=== Female Youth Artist of the Year ===
- **Karol G**
- Becky G
- Cazzu
- Chiquis
- Farina
- Kany García
- Mariah Angeliq
- Nathy Peluso
- Natti Natasha
- Rosalía

=== Favorite Group or Duo of the Year ===
- **Grupo Firme**
- Calibre 50
- CNCO
- Los Ángeles Azules
- Los Dos Carnales
- Mau y Ricky
- N'Klabe
- Piso 21
- Reik
- Zion y Lennox

=== Album of the Year ===
- '**El Último Tour Del Mundo' – Bad Bunny**
- 'Alter Ego' – Prince Royce
- 'Déja Vu' – CNCO
- 'KG0516' – Karol G
- 'Los Legendarios 001' – Los Legendarios
- 'Mesa Para Dos' – Kany García
- 'Mi Manos' – Camilo
- 'Munay' – Pedro Capó
- 'Papi Juancho' – Maluma
- 'Una Niña Inútil' – Cazzu
