= Bubalu =

Bubalu may refer to:

- "Bubalu" (DJ Luian and Mambo Kingz song)
- "Bubalu" (Feid and Rema song)
