= Bubalu (Feid and Rema song) =

Single by Feid and Rema

from the album Mor, No Le Temas a la Oscuridad
- Released: September 22, 2023
- Studio: Black Rock Studios
- Genre: Latin Urbano
- Length: 3:48
- Label: Universal Music Latino
- Songwriters: Andres David Restrepo Echavarría; Divine Ikubor; Salomón Villada Hoyos
- Producer: Sky Rompiendo

Feid singles chronology
"Classy 101" (2023)	"Bubalu" (2023)	"Luna" (2024)

Rema singles chronology
"Charm" (2023)	"Bubalu" (2023)	"Benin Boys" (2024)

Music video
- "Bubalu" on YouTube

"Bubalu" is a song by Colombian singer-songwriter Feid and Nigerian singer and rapper Rema. It was released on September 22, 2023, through Universal Music Latino, as the fourth single from Feid's sixth studio album Mor, No Le Temas a la Oscuridad (2023).

== Background ==
“Bubalu” can be anything you want.

Really, literally, “Bubbaloo” is a piece of gum. But “bubalu” is something you really like. It can be anything they give you, anything at all.

That song was all born in the studio. This one was specifically one we made in Miami in the studio. It was one of the first ones we did, like when all the guys got together to make music. Around that time, I was listening to a lot of Nigerian music, and that's where Rema's band came from. I've been following his music for years; I think he's a great band, and I really like his music. That was a great band there.

— Feid on how the song came about, Genius.

== Music video ==
Upon release, the track was accompanied by an official video in which Feid and his team celebrate the good times as they cruise on a boat around Spain.

== Credits and personnel ==
Credits were adapted from Apple Music.

- Feid – Vocals, Songwriter
- Rema – Vocals, Songwriter, Recording Engineer
- Andres David Restrepo Echavarría – Songwriter, Recording Engineer
- Sky Rompiendo – Producer
- Wain – Mixing Engineer, Mastering Engineer

== Accolades ==
Awards and nominations for "Bubalu"
Organization	Year	Category	Result	Ref.
Premios Lo Nuestro	2025	Song of the Year	Nominated	
Premios Lo Nuestro	2025	Pop-Urban Collaboration Of The Year	Nominated	

== Charts ==
Weekly chart performance for "Bubalu"
Chart (2023–2024)	Peak position
Argentina Hot 100 (Billboard)	61
Colombia (Billboard)	7
Ecuador (Billboard)	21
Panama (PRODUCE)	41
Peru (Billboard)	14
Spain (PROMUSICAE)	23
US Latin Airplay (Billboard)	1
US Latin Rhythm Airplay (Billboard)	1
US Hot Latin Songs (Billboard)	25
US World Digital Song Sales (Billboard)	14

== Certifications ==
Certifications for "Bubalu"
Region	Certification	Certified units/sales
Spain (PROMUSICAE)	Platinum	60,000^{‡}
United States (RIAA)	2× Platinum (Latin)	120,000^{‡}
Streaming
Central America (CFC)	Platinum	7,000,000^{†}
^{‡} Sales+streaming figures based on certification alone.^{†} Streaming-only figures based on certification alone.

== Release history ==
Release date and format(s) for "Bubalu"
Region	Date	Format(s)	Label	Ref.
Various	September 22, 2023	Digital download; streaming	Universal Latino	
Italy	13 October 2023	Radio airplay	EMI Records	
