= Brickell (song) =

2024 song by Feid and Yandel

Song by Feid and Yandel

from the EP Manifesting 20-05
- Language: Spanish
- Published: April 11, 2024
- Genre: Reggaeton
- Label: Universal Latino; La Leyenda; In-Tu Línea
- Songwriters: Johan Espinosa Cuervo; Andrés Restrepo Echevarría; Salomón Villada Hoyos; Llandel Veguilla Malave; Joan Ubinas Jiménez
- Producer: Jowan

"Brickell" is a song by Colombian singer Feid and Puerto Rican singer Yandel. It was released on April 10, 2024, through Universal Music Latino, La Leyenda LLC and In-Tu Línea, as part of their collaborative extended play Manifesting 20-05.

== Background and release ==
On April 2, 2024, Feid announced the release of the EP Manifesting 20-05 with Yandel, through a post on Instagram. It was finally released on April 11, 2024, and "Brickell" was included as track 3 of the EP.

== Music video ==
The music video for "Brickell" was included in a single video that compiles all the music videos of the songs from the EP Manifesting 20-05. This compilation was released on April 11, 2024, on Feid's YouTube channel, concurrently with the EP release.

== Lyric video ==
The lyric video was published on April 11, 2024, on Feid's YouTube channel, simultaneous with the release of the EP.

== Charts ==
Weekly chart performance for "Brickell"
Chart (2024)	Peak position
Bolivia (Billboard)	24
Colombia (Billboard)	2
Ecuador (Billboard)	3
Peru (Billboard)	9
Spain (PROMUSICAE)	83
US Hot Latin Songs (Billboard)	15
US Latin Airplay (Billboard)	2
US Latin Rhythm Airplay (Billboard)	1

== Certifications ==
Certifications for "Brickell"
Region	Certification	Certified units/sales
Spain (Promusicae)	Gold	30,000^{‡}
Streaming
Central America (CFC)	Platinum	7,000,000^{†}
^{‡} Sales+streaming figures based on certification alone.^{†} Streaming-only figures based on certification alone.
