= Classy 101 =

- Single cover art

Single by Feid and Young Miko

from the EP Ferxxocalipsis
- Language: Spanish
- Released: March 31, 2023
- Genre: Reggaeton
- Length: 3:15
- Label: Universal Latino
- Songwriters: Salomón Villada; María Victoria Ramírez de Arellano; Héctor Caleb López; Diego López Crespo; Benjamin Falik; Esteban Higuita Estrada; Miguel Montoya
- Producers: Caleb Calloway; Mauro; Julia Lewis

Feid singles chronology
"Remix Exclusivo" (2023)	"Classy 101" (2023)	"Niña Bonita" (2023)

Young Miko singles chronology
"Cuando Te Toca" (2023)	"Classy 101" (2023)	"Brinca" (2023)

Music video
- "Classy 101" on YouTube

"Classy 101" is a song by the Colombian singer-songwriter Feid and the Puerto Rican rapper Young Miko from Feid's second extended play (EP), Ferxxocalipsis (2023). Feid, Miko, Wain, and Bonaroti wrote the song with its producers, Caleb Calloway, Mauro, and Julia Lewis. Since Miko began her professional career with Calloway as producer, she attracted the attention of several artists who shared the stage and collaborated with her and became viral on TikTok with two songs. She initially composed the song in Los Angeles until she met Feid there by surprise, having no contact with him before and always having been his fan. Universal Music Latino released the song as a single on March 31 with the premiere of its music video and later included it in Ferxxocalipsis on December 1.

Music journalists praised "Classy 101" and described it as a reggaeton with a minimalist sound and an edgy perreo fusion that talks about a carnal desire linked to lust for a highly seductive woman that the narrator cannot ignore. The song was also ranked on lists as one of the best Latin songs of 2023. It reached the top 10 in twelve countries and was certified platinum in Brazil, Mexico, Spain, and the US. The song was Miko's first entry on the Billboard Hot 100. Deathofgian directed the music video for the song, which portrays a couple in love riding a motorcycle and shows Miko and Feid singing in different scenarios. It won a Los 40 Music Award, a Lo Nuestro Award, and two Latin American Music Awards. The song was included on the set list of Miko and Feid's headlining concert tours and was performed at the Los 40 Music Awards and at several music festivals.

== Background and release ==
In 2021, the Puerto Rican producers Caleb Calloway and Angelo Torres founded their own record label, the Wave Music Group. Calloway has been Young Miko's manager and producer since the beginning of her professional career. After the success of "105 Freestyle", her debut single, Miko had begun attracting the attention of several artists. In 2022, she shared the stage with the Puerto Rican rappers Bad Bunny and Villano Antillano and the Colombian singer Karol G. In 2022 and 2023, she made many collaborations with other artists—including Arcángel ("Kilimanjaro") and Yandel ("Cuando Te Toca")—and became viral on TikTok for "Riri" and "Lisa", songs from her first studio album, Trap Kitty (2023). In an interview with El Hormiguero, Miko stated that she initially composed "Classy 101" when she was in Los Angeles, where she met Feid. The rapper clarified that she had not composed it for him nor had been in contact with him before, but she had always been his fan. She described the process as "super-natural" and added that "fue muy fácil fluir con él".

During Feid's concert tour, Ferxxo Nitro Jam Tour, he announced and released "Remix Exclusivo" on March 17, 2023, through Universal Music Latino. Two weeks later, during his concert in Lima, Peru, on March 30, a music video for the song directed by Deathofgian premiered on YouTube. The single was launched through Universal Music Latino the next day. Happy FM's Lucía Castillo and Los 40's Laura Coca described the video as green-toned footage wherein speed, motorcycles, cars, racing, adrenaline, and sensuality star. It includes a scene where Miko strokes a woman's hair in a room. On August 24, Feid announced on Instagram his sixth studio album, Mor, No Le Temas a la Oscuridad, preceded by its singles "Niña Bonita", "Vente Conmigo", "Ferxxo 151", and "Bubalu", released after "Classy 101". The album was subsequently released on September 29. On November 29, he announced the surprise release of his second EP, Ferxxocalipsis. On Instagram, he shared, "I want you to enjoy it as it is, during Ferxxo's favorite month!! I'm thankful to everyone that was a part of this. Colombia has so much to show and this is just another piece of that!!!". He also revealed its contents, with "Classy 101" as the tenth track.

== Composition and critical reception ==
"Classy 101"
"Classy 101", a reggaeton song, addresses a carnal desire, wherein it describes the lover's sensual behavior in the chorus.

"Classy 101" is three minutes and fifteen seconds long. Feid, Miko, Wain, and Bonaroti wrote the song with its producers, Caleb Calloway, Mauro, and Julia Lewis. Wain handled recording in Los Angeles, mixing with EARCANDY, and mastering; the last two took place in 24k Mastering. Musically, it is a reggaeton song with an "edgy" sandungueo number and minimalist sound. Its lyrics relate a carnal desire linked to lust to a highly seductive woman that the narrator cannot ghost. They begin admitting that they obsessively imagine the person's body without that "Valentino" and their desire to have a sexual encounter with her "aunque no sea formal" (transl. "although it is not formal"). The chorus describes the lover's non-romantic, sensual, and problematic behavior and how it sexually provokes them. Later in the verses, the idea is continued in a discotheque scene detailing her performance, and their desire to surrender themselves completely to her and urging her to "[sacar] las esposas" (transl. "take off the handcuffs") at the end of the lyrics.

Music journalism gave generally positive reviews to the song. Los 40's Miguel Ángel Bargueño and Irina Avilés Millán confessed that the track "invites to twerk", and cited it as a song that marked "a before and after" on Miko's career and global audience, respectively. HappyFM's staff praised Miko and Feid's collaboration and the song's originality, as well as the duo's artistic growth. Citing it as one of her most popular songs for its commercial success and reception among fans, Publimetro's Yoselin Garcés suggested that Miko could be one of the best singers of the year. "Classy 101" appeared on Billboard's list of the best Latin songs of 2023 "so far", ranking it at number eight and praising Feid and Miko's vocal performances. Los Angeles Times' Suzy Esposito included the song in their year-end list of the 23 best Latin music songs of 2023 at number 20, describing the line "Tú te ves cara, bitchy, classy, cuatro fantastic" as "simply, hilariously, kind of aspirational." Jesús Lozada of La Nación ranked it at number 21 among the newspaper's list of the 23 most-notable songs of 2023, highlighting its massive presence during the year and its rhythm that invites anyone to "give everything on the floor" In September 2023, Telemundo's staff listed it as one of the ten essential songs for getting to know Miko.

== Commercial performance ==
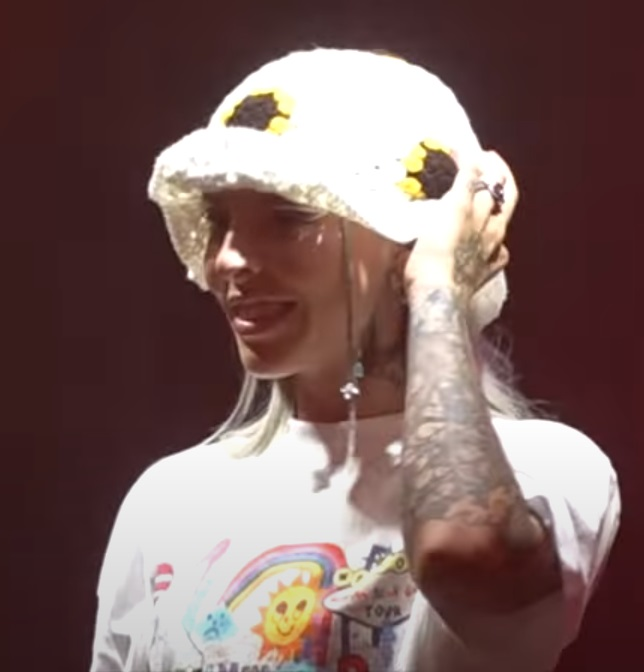
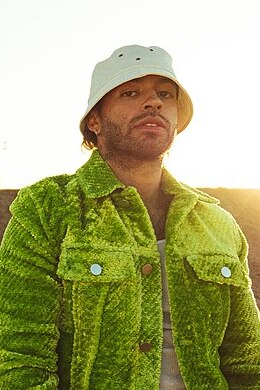
Miko (left) achieved with "Classy 101" her first entry on the Billboard Hot 100, while Feid (right) achieved his third entry.

"Classy 101" charted in the top 10 of singles charts in Chile (2), Colombia (2), Peru (2), Costa Rica (3), Dominican Republic (3), Ecuador (3), Honduras (3), El Salvador (4), Bolivia (6), Argentina (9), Panama (9), and Paraguay (9). In Spain, it reached number six in the national chart and received a 6× Platinum certification from the Productores de Música de España (PROMUSICAE). In Mexico and Brazil, it obtained platinum and gold certifications from the Asociación Mexicana de Productores de Fonogramas y Videogramas (AMPROFON) and Pro-Música Brasil (PMB), respectively.

The song debuted at number two on the Bubbling Under Hot 100 Singles chart issued on April 29, 2023; it topped the chart for two weeks starting with the chart issued for the week of May 20. On June 16, the song started at number 99 on the Billboard Hot 100 due to an increase of 11% to 5.5 million streams and 1.5 million audience impressions in the United States, being Miko's first entry on the chart and Feid's third entry. In the same week, it also climbed four spots to number 15 on the Hot Latin Songs chart, five to number 24 on the Billboard Global 200 (with a streaming increase of 7% to 33.5 million), and three to number 19 on the Global Excl. US. The Recording Industry Association of America (RIAA) certified the single 19× Platinum, indicating sales and track-equivalent on-demand streams totaling 1.14 million units based on their Latin certification criteria.

== Live performances and usage ==
"Classy 101" was included on the set list of Miko's headlining concert tours: the Trap Kitty World Tour" (2023) (Note: Attributed to Crónica for the show in Argentina, Eje21 for Colombia, El Nuevo Diario for the Dominican Republic, FM Dos and RedGol for Chile, Los 40 for Costa Rica, and Soy502 for Guatemala.) and the XOXO Tour (2024), as well as Feid's Ferxxocalipsis World Tour (2024) and Europe Fastest Tour (2025). On May 20, 2023, the Mexican singer Peso Pluma published an Instagram story dancing to the song with a beer in hand during a trip in Punta Cana, Dominican Republic. Feid and Miko performed the song at the 2023 and 2024 editions of La Velada del Año, respectively. The Dominican singer Nickzzy included a line of the song on his single "Chula". At the 18th Los 40 Music Awards, the duo performed the song live and Feid also performed "Bubalu". Regarding solo performances, the song was performed by Miko on her show at the Coca-Cola Flow Fest in 2023 and at the Coachella Valley Music & Arts Festival and the Fuego Fuego Latin Music Festival in 2024. She also performed it at her shows in Mexico (Monterrey, Guadalajara, and Mexico City). In the same year, Feid included it on the set list of his shows at Lollapalooza Chile, Lollapalooza Argentina, and Festival Estéreo Picnic. In 2025 and 2026, he performed the song at Lollapalooza Paris, Granca Live Fest and Austin City Limits Music Festival.

== Accolades ==
At the 18th Los 40 Music Awards, the Spanish writer Elísabet Benavent presented the Best Urban Song category; when giving the award to "Classy 101", she only mentioned Feid. However, when he went on stage, he made a gesture to Miko asking for her to come, and subsequently credited her for the song and invited her to say "lo que le nazca". This action received widespread attention and was acclaimed by both fans and media outlets.

Awards and nominations for "Classy 101"
Organization	Year	Category	Result	Ref.
Latin American Music Awards	2024	Global Latin Song of the Year	Won	
Latin American Music Awards	2024	Best Collaboration – Urban	Won	
Los 40 Music Awards	2023	Best Urban Collaboration	Nominated	
Los 40 Music Awards	2023	Best Urban Song	Won	
Lo Nuestro Awards	2024	Urban Song of the Year	Won	
Premios Nuestra Tierra	2024	Best Urban Song	Nominated	
Premios Nuestra Tierra	2024	Best Urban Collaboration	Nominated	
MTV MIAW Awards	2023	Reggaeton Hit	Nominated	
Nickelodeon Mexico Kids' Choice Awards	2023	Favorite Collaboration	Nominated	

== Personnel ==
Credits are adapted from the liner notes of Ferxxocalipsis.

- Feid (Salomón Villada) – vocals, songwriter
- Young Miko (María Victoria Ramírez de Arellano) – vocals, songwriter
- Caleb Calloway (Héctor Caleb López) – producer, songwriter
- Mauro (Diego López Crespo) – producer, songwriter
- Julia Lewis (Benjamin Falik) – producer, songwriter
- Wain (Esteban Higuita Estrada) – mix, mastering and recording engineer, songwriter
- Bonaroti (Miguel Montoya) – songwriter
- EARCANDY – Dolby Atmos mixing engineer
- Rodolfo Ramos – artists and repertoire
- Aldo the Master – artists and repertoire

== Charts ==
=== Weekly charts ===
Weekly chart performance for "Classy 101"
Chart (2023)	Peak position
Argentina Hot 100 (Billboard)	9
Bolivia (Billboard)	6
Central America + Caribbean (FONOTICA)	7
Chile (Billboard)	2
Colombia (Billboard)	2
Costa Rica (FONOTICA)	2
Dominican Republic Airplay (Monitor Latino)	3
Ecuador (Billboard)	3
El Salvador (ASAP EGC)	10
Global 200 (Billboard)	17
Guatemala Airplay (Monitor Latino)	14
Honduras Airplay (Monitor Latino)	3
Mexico (Billboard)	19
Nicaragua Airplay (Monitor Latino)	15
Panama Airplay (Monitor Latino)	9
Paraguay Airplay (Monitor Latino)	9
Peru (Billboard)	2
Spain (PROMUSICAE)	6
Uruguay Airplay (Monitor Latino)	16
US Billboard Hot 100	99
US Hot Latin Songs (Billboard)	15
US Latin Airplay (Billboard)	28

=== Monthly charts ===
Monthly chart performance for "Classy 101"
Chart (2023)	Peak position
Paraguay (SGP)	7
Uruguay (CUD)	9

=== Year-end charts ===
2023 year-end chart performance for "Classy 101"
Chart (2023)	Peak position
Central America Airplay (Monitor Latino)	29
Colombia Airplay (Monitor Latino)	9
Costa Rica Airplay (Monitor Latino)	45
Dominican Republic Airlplay (Monitor Latino)	5
Ecuador Airplay (Monitor Latino)	40
El Salvador Airplay (Monitor Latino)	22
Global 200 (Billboard)	68
Guatemala Airplay (Monitor Latino)	66
Honduras Airplay (Monitor Latino)	17
Nicaragua Airplay (Monitor Latino)	55
Panama Airplay (Monitor Latino)	29
Paraguay Airplay (Monitor Latino)	32
Peru Airplay (Monitor Latino)	12
Spain (PROMUSICAE)	17
Uruguay (CUD)	11
US Hot Latin Songs (Billboard)	19
Venezuela (Monitor Latino)	95

== Certifications ==
Certifications for "Classy 101"
Region	Certification	Certified units/sales
Brazil (Pro-Música Brasil)	Gold	20,000^{‡}
Mexico (AMPROFON)	Platinum	140,000^{‡}
Spain (Promusicae)	6× Platinum	360,000^{‡}
United States (RIAA)	19× Platinum (Latin)	1,140,000^{‡}
Streaming
Central America (CFC)	Diamond	35,000,000^{†}
^{‡} Sales+streaming figures based on certification alone.^{†} Streaming-only figures based on certification alone.

== Release history ==
Release date and format(s) for "Luna"
Region	Date	Format(s)	Label	Ref.
Various	March 31, 2023	Digital download; streaming	Universal Latino	
