= Qué Rico Fuera =

2021 single by Ricky Martin

Single by Ricky Martin and Paloma Mami
- Language: Spanish; English
- English title: "How Sweet It Would Be"
- Released: June 10, 2021
- Recorded: 2021
- Genre: Urban pop; Afro-Latin; Latin pop
- Length: 3:37
- Label: Sony Latin
- Songwriters: Enrique Martin Morales; Paloma Rocío Castillo Astorga; Kevyn Mauricio Cruz; Juan Camilo Vargas; Wissem Larfaoui
- Producers: Juan Camilo Vargas; Kevyn Mauricio Cruz; Wissem Larfaoui

Ricky Martin singles chronology
"Canción Bonita" (2021)	"Qué Rico Fuera" (2021)	"Otra Noche en L.A." (2022)

Paloma Mami singles chronology
"Que Wea" (2021)	"Qué Rico Fuera" (2021)	"Cosas De La Vida" (2021)

Music video
- "Qué Rico Fuera" on YouTube

"Qué Rico Fuera" (transl. "How Sweet It Would Be") is a song recorded by Puerto Rican singer Ricky Martin and American singer Paloma Mami. The song was written by Martin, Mami, Kevyn Mauricio Cruz, Juan Camilo Vargas, and Wissem Larfaoui, while the production was handled by Vargas, Cruz, and Larfaoui. It was released for digital download and streaming by Sony Music Latin on June 10, 2021. A primarily Spanish language urban pop, Afro-Latin, and Latin pop song, its lyrics are sensual and flirty.

"Qué Rico Fuera" received widely positive reviews from music critics, who complimented its fusion of sounds. It was nominated for International Collaboration of the Year at the 2021 Premios MUSA. The song was commercially successful in Latin America, reaching number one in Chile, Costa Rica, Puerto Rico, and Uruguay, as well as the top 10 in Argentina and El Salvador, and Billboard's Latin Pop Airplay in the United States. It also became Mami's first entry on the Billboard Latin Airplay, Latin Pop Airplay, Latin Digital Song Sales, Argentina Hot 100, and Mexico Airplay charts.

An accompanying music video, released simultaneously with the song, was directed by Dominican director Jessy Terrero and filmed in Simi Valley, California. It depicts Martin and Mami getting ready for a celebration at night. To promote the song, the singers performed it on several television programs and award shows, including the 2021 Premios Juventud.

== Background and release ==
Ricky Martin started recording his eleventh studio album, initially titled Movimiento, in the second half of 2019, inspired by the 2019 political protests in Puerto Rico. While, because of the COVID-19 pandemic and subsequent personal experiences, Martin decided to split the album Movimiento into the two EPs Pausa and Play. On May 21, 2021, Martin shared a photo from the music video on Instagram, with the caption, "Coming soon. #Videoshoot #newsingle". On June 2, People revealed the single's release date in an article and mentioned that it would be the lead single for Play. Two days later, Martin announced that he has collaborated with Paloma Mami on the song, and revealed the song's title as "Qué Rico Fuera". In an interview with People, Martin told the magazine:

I felt it was the perfect song to collaborate with this incredible artist from Chile who I'd happen to be listening to for a while named Paloma Mami... and wait until you see this girl! She brought that flavor to the track.

Mami told Vos magazine: "When they called me I couldn't believe it. I was so excited! Anyone would get this way knowing that they would be working with someone as tremendously talented as Ricky." Finally, due to COVID-19 pandemic restrictions, the two singers recorded the song separately, and then they met for the first time at the video shoot in California. The song was released for digital download and streaming by Sony Music Latin on June 10, 2021, marking the first collaboration between Martin and Paloma Mami. Despite previous announcements, the song was not included in Play.

== Music and lyrics ==
"Qué Rico Fuera"
A 15-second sample of the chorus, which features rhythmic Caribbean melody.

Musically, "Qué Rico Fuera" is a primarily Spanish language urban pop, Afro-Latin and Latin pop song, written by Martin, Mami, Kevyn Mauricio Cruz, Juan Camilo Vargas, and Wissem Larfaoui. Its production was handled by Vargas, Cruz and Larfaoui, and the song features elements of reggaeton, Afro-beats, and Tropical vibes. Martin says that the rhythms are influenced by his DNA, and explains: "My thing is to find the magic in different cultures and break barriers. At the end of the day, I grab a bit of the rhythms that move me, turn them into my sound, and that's the dynamic that has worked." He also expresses that "it's all about the mix, the union and cultures".

The single runs for a total of 3 minutes and 37 seconds, and lyrically, "Qué Rico Fuera" which translates to "How Sweet It Would Be" in English, is described as "sultry" and "sensual". Martin sings about a potential night in ecstasy, and Mami, who sings in Spanglish, offers her own evening of fun. The "flirty" lyrics include "Regálame una noche entera / Que yo te doy lo que tú quiera" ("Give me a whole night / That I give you what you want"). In an interview with Grammy.com, Martin told the website: "One thing is sensuality. One thing is sexuality. Let's mix them both. When I walk onstage, I bring my culture with me. I'm Latino and we're not afraid of playing with our sexuality, so that's important. Why run away from that?"

== Critical reception ==
Upon release, "Qué Rico Fuera" was met with widely positive reviews from music critics. Jessica Roiz from Billboard described it as "a rhythmic Caribbean bop". Los 40's Javier Sandoval gave it a positive review, saying it is "a sound party capable of making those who listen to it happy immediately, something more than valuable in these difficult days". Lucas Villa from mitú applauded the track: "Martin and Mami prove to be a dream time on this alluring club banger." Cadena Dial's MJ Aledón labeled it "an original, refreshing and highly necessary song at this time". Also from Cadena Dial, Noelia Bertol ranked it as one of "Ricky Martin six collaborations that have us moving the skeleton" and named it "[a] very powerful collaboration". In another article, she listed the track among his ten "songs that brighten up summers". Monitor Latino's Josh Mendez called the song a "potential hit" and admired it for taking its listeners "back to those nights of partying and seduction", before COVID-19 pandemic.

Writing for FM Dos, Carla López praised the single, saying it "mixes genres such as pop, Afro-Latin, and urban music, for an incredible result". Marcin Michałowski from Radio Złote Przeboje complimented its lyrics "that make 'Qué Rico Fuera' the perfect summer item" and an author of SlovakWoman.sk called the track a "catchy song". Pronto.com staff named it "a mega success with the emerging international artist Paloma Mami that promises to make everyone dance". In her review for Liguria Oggi, Redazione Liguria described it as "a perfect summer hit" and wrote: "Ricky Martin and Paloma Mami are ready to make the whole world dance to the tune of 'Qué Rico Fuera'." Sam Damshenas from Gay Times labeled the track "a certified smash" and "a dance banger".

=== Accolades ===
Amazon Music ranked "Qué Rico Fuera" as the 90th Best Latin song of the year. ¡Hola! listed the track among the top 10 "songs that made us dance in 2021". The song was nominated for International Collaboration of the Year at the 2021 Premios MUSA.

== Commercial performance ==
"Qué Rico Fuera" debuted at number 45 on the US Latin Airplay chart on July 3, 2021, becoming Martin's 45th entry on the chart, and Mami's first. It subsequently peaked at number 24 on the chart on August 7, 2021. The song also peaked at numbers seven and eight on Billboard's Latin Pop Airplay and Latin Digital Song Sales, respectively, giving Mami her first entry on both charts. The song also extended Martin's own record as the artist with most top 20s on the US Latin Pop Airplay chart, with 51 songs, and became his 40th top 10 hit on the chart, making him the second artist in history to achieve this milestone. The song was certified Latin gold by the Recording Industry Association of America (RIAA), for track-equivalent sales of over 30,000 units in the US. Besides the United States, "Qué Rico Fuera" reached number one in Chile, Costa Rica, Puerto Rico, and Uruguay, as well as the top 10 in Argentina and El Salvador. In Guatemala and Mexico, and on the Monitor Latino Latin America chart, it peaked in the top 20. The song also became Mami's first entry on Billboard's Argentina Hot 100 and Mexico Airplay.

== Music video ==
A screenshot from the music video, depicting Martin getting ready in the barbershop.

On June 10, 2021, Martin and Mami shared snippets of the accompanying music video and announced that it would be released the following day. The visual was released alongside the song on the specified date. The video was filmed in Simi Valley, California, and directed by Dominican director Jessy Terrero, who had previously directed the videos for Martin's singles "Adrenalina", "Que Se Sienta El Deseo", and "Vente Pa' Ca". The music video begins with Martin walking in a street, while three girls dance when he starts singing. Then two dancers join behind the singer, as he continues singing and dancing in the street. In the next scene, the singers get ready for a celebration at night. Martin enters a barbershop and makes everyone stop working, and dance to the beat of the music. Then, Mami appears in a room full of colors and pink lighting along with two other girls who join in the dance. The audiovisual alternates the two scenarios, one, in which Ricky asks for a whole night, and the other, in which Mami conditions him. Martin changes clothes in front of everyone's eyes as he enters the changing rooms of a fashion house, and picks a gala dress that quickly shows off with his bare chest. Finally both singers appear together in a celebration in the street full of many lights, giving dynamism to the image.

Alicia Civita from Los Angeles Times wrote about "Qué Rico Fuera" video: "It has a playful and tropical tone, which oscillates between fun and sensuality. In fact, it fits perfectly in the Latin aesthetic of this summer, marked by the saturation of colors and the sophistication of scenes of daily life that is seen in the movie In the Heights." She also praised the chemistry between the two singers, considering the fact that they had just met shortly before recording the music video. Lucas Villa from mitú described the visual as "hot-and-heavy" and said it "arrives just in time for the summer season". He also labeled it "[a] neon-lit music video" in his Grammy.com article.

== Live performances and appearances in media ==
Martin and Mami gave their first live performance of "Qué Rico Fuera" at the 18th Annual Premios Juventud on July 22, 2021, which was ranked as one of the best and most memorable moments of the ceremony by Entertainment Tonight. Later that year, Martin performed the song for Savage X Fenty Show Vol. 3, which premiered on Amazon Prime Video on September 24, 2021. Amy Lee from Entertainment Tonight described his performance as energetic. "Qué Rico Fuera" was included on the set list for the Enrique Iglesias and Ricky Martin Live in Concert tour, which began at the MGM Grand Garden Arena in Las Vegas, Nevada on September 25, 2021. He filmed his live performance of the song live from MGM Grand Garden Arena for the Global Citizen Live. Mar Tarrés and Franco Mariotti danced to the song on the fifteenth season of the Argentine dance competition television series Bailando por un Sueño.

== Track listing ==
Digital download / streaming
No.	Title	Length
1.	"Qué Rico Fuera"	3:37

== Credits and personnel ==
Credits adapted from Tidal.

- Ricky Martin – vocal, composer, lyricist, associated performer
- Paloma Mami – vocal, composer, lyricist, associated performer
- Kevyn Mauricio Cruz – composer, lyricist, producer
- Juan Camilo Vargas – composer, lyricist, producer
- Wissem Larfaoui – composer, lyricist, producer
- Mayra del Valle – A&R coordinator
- Izzy De Jesús – A&R director
- Felipe Tichaur – mastering engineer
- Alejandro Patiño "Mosty" – mixing engineer
- Angelo Carretta – recording engineer

== Charts ==
=== Weekly charts ===
Weekly peak performance for "Qué Rico Fuera"
Chart (2021–2022)	Peak position
Argentina Hot 100 (Billboard)	60
Argentina (Monitor Latino)	8
Chile (Monitor Latino)	1
Costa Rica (Monitor Latino)	1
Dominican Republic Pop (Monitor Latino)	10
Ecuador Pop (Monitor Latino)	10
El Salvador (Monitor Latino)	9
Guatemala (Monitor Latino)	12
Honduras Pop (Monitor Latino)	6
Latin America (Monitor Latino)	16
Mexico (Billboard Mexican Airplay)	28
Mexico (Monitor Latino)	16
Panama Pop (Monitor Latino)	5
Paraguay Pop (Monitor Latino)	9
Peru Pop (Monitor Latino)	8
Puerto Rico (Monitor Latino)	1
Uruguay (Monitor Latino)	1
US Latin Airplay (Billboard)	24
US Latin Digital Song Sales (Billboard)	8
US Latin Pop Airplay (Billboard)	7
Venezuela Pop (Monitor Latino)	10

=== Monthly charts ===
Monthly chart position for "Qué Rico Fuera"
Chart (2021)	Peak position
Paraguay (SGP)	51

=== Year-end charts ===
2021 year-end chart performance for "Qué Rico Fuera"
Chart (2021)	Position
Argentina (Monitor Latino)	13
Chile (Monitor Latino)	7
Costa Rica (Monitor Latino)	91
Dominican Republic Pop (Monitor Latino)	37
Ecuador Pop (Monitor Latino)	38
El Salvador (Monitor Latino)	96
Guatemala Pop (Monitor Latino)	66
Honduras Pop (Monitor Latino)	62
Latin America (Monitor Latino)	78
Mexico Pop (Monitor Latino)	69
Panama Pop (Monitor Latino)	25
Paraguay Pop (Monitor Latino)	28
Puerto Rico (Monitor Latino)	11
Uruguay (Monitor Latino)	20
US Latin Pop Airplay (Billboard)	29
Venezuela Pop (Monitor Latino)	42

2022 year-end chart performance for "Qué Rico Fuera"
Chart (2022)	Position
Chile (Monitor Latino)	72
Dominican Republic Pop (Monitor Latino)	95
Panama Pop (Monitor Latino)	46

2023 year-end chart performance for "Qué Rico Fuera"
Chart (2023)	Position
Chile Pop (Monitor Latino)	79

== Certifications ==
Certifications and sales for "Qué Rico Fuera"
Region	Certification	Certified units/sales
United States (RIAA)	Gold (Latin)	30,000^{‡}
^{‡} Sales+streaming figures based on certification alone.

== Release history ==
Release dates and formats for "Qué Rico Fuera"
Region	Date	Format(s)	Label	Ref.
Various	June 10, 2021	Digital download; streaming	Sony Music Latin	
Latin America	June 11, 2021	Contemporary hit radio	Sony Music Latin	
Italy	July 16, 2021	Contemporary hit radio	Sony Music Latin	
