= Luna (Feid and ATL Jacob song) =

- Single cover art

Single by Feid and ATL Jacob

from the EP Ferxxocalipsis
- Language: Spanish
- English title: "Moon"
- Released: March 1, 2024
- Studio: Art & Music (Milan)
- Genre: Reggaeton
- Length: 3:16
- Label: Universal Latino
- Songwriter: Salomón Villada
- Producers: ATL Jacob; Hendrix Smoke; EVRGRN; 254Bodi; FritzOnDaTrack

Feid singles chronology
"Empelotica" (2024)	"Luna" (2024)	"Te Colaboro" (2024)

ATL Jacob singles chronology
"RNS" (2024)	"Luna" (2024)	"Grand Finale" (2024)

Music video
- "Luna" on YouTube

"Luna" (transl. "Moon") is a song by the Colombian singer-songwriter Feid and American producer ATL Jacob from Feid's second extended play (EP), Ferxxocalipsis (2023). Feid wrote the song along with co-producers Jacob, Hendrix Smoke, EVRGRN, 254Bodi, and FritzOnDaTrak. Universal Music Latino sent it to Italian radio as the album's third single on March 1, 2024. Musically, it is a reggaeton song about a woman leaving a past relationship for a new person, inspired by a night that Feid spent in Madrid. Music critics praised the song for its collaboration work, catchiness, and lyrical content, viewing it as an effort to expand American hip hop and Feid's international audiences.

"Luna" topped the national charts in eight countries and was certified diamond in Central America and platinum in Portugal, Spain, and the US. It was Feid and Jacob's first top-five entry on the Billboard Global Excl. US chart. Sebastián Sánchez directed the music video for the song, released on March 6, 2024, which shows a broken relationship in a time loop, wherein the man tries to fix things with his partner. The song received several nominations, including a Latin Grammy Awards nomination for Best Urban Song and winning an Our Country Award and a Heat Latin Music Award. Feid performed the song at music festivals and at the 2024 Copa América opening ceremony. He included it on the set list of the Ferxxocalipsis World Tour (2024) and proposed a remix with the Puerto Rican rapper Don Omar.

== Background and composition ==
Continuing the surprise launch precedent set by his first extended play Sixdo, Feid announced the release of his second EP, Ferxxocalipsis, on November 29, 2023. On Instagram, he shared, "I want you to enjoy it as it is, during Ferxxo's favorite month!! I'm thankful to everyone that was a part of this. Colombia has so much to show and this is just another piece of that!!!". He also revealed its contents, including "Luna" as the sixth track. Universal Latino released the album alongside the song on December 1 in the same year. On March 1, 2024, the record label sent the track to Italian radio as a single. One month later, during a questions-and-answers session with his fans on Instagram, Feid explained that the song was recorded on his cellphone and inspired by a night when he was in Madrid "lying in bed, without a shirt, without bathing and watching the moon through the window", before being re-recorded in the studio in a session with ATL Jacob organized by Universal Music Publishing Group.

"Luna"
"Luna", a reggaeton heartbreak production, relates an ended relationship, wherein Feid said to his partner, "my treasure", before singing the chorus.

"Luna" is three minutes and sixteen seconds long. Feid wrote the song, while ATL Jacob co-produced the song with others and provided background vocals. It was recorded, mixed, and mastered by Wain at Art & Music Studios in Milan through 24k Mastering. "Luna" is a reggaeton heartbreak song with fused elements of Latin rhythms and American hip hop. The lyrics are about a woman leaving a past relationship to go with a new person.

The song begins with Feid remembering good moments of the former relationship, such as the last time he saw his partner smile and the nights they used "not to sleep". He names her "my queen" and "my treasure" before repeating in the chorus: "No supe qué día te olvidaste de mí / Y-y de mí / Y-y yo de ti" (lit. 'I did not know what day you forgot about me / And-and about me / And-and me about you'). Later in the song, he expresses his desire to forgive her, but also claims that she "[lo tiró para] la lona [y le dejó] en cero toda la estámina" (lit. 'threw [him] to the canvas [and zeroed] all the stamina'). He continues assuring her that she also misses the cars and "making love" with him when they were "farros". Feid also remembers her lies in the line, " 'Baby, te extraño' / Que duraríamos años" (lit. ''Baby, I miss you' / That we would last for years'), which became the most viral part of the song on the social media platform TikTok. He ends the song wishing that he could forget her.

== Critical reception and accolades ==
Rolling Stone's Valentina Villamil and Billboard Argentina noted that "Luna" is the second song on which Feid has invited an American hip hop producer, following "Le Pido a Dios", calling it an effort to expand American hip hop and the artist's reach around the world. José María Almoguera of Telecinco, highlighting its virality a few days after the EP's release and the number of TikTok videos using the track, labeled "Luna" as the new breakup anthem. Considering that the song was the most played on Los 40's radio stations in all available countries for three non-consecutive weeks, Miguel Ángel Bargueño described the production as "elegant", such that it was impossible not to "move our hips every time we hear it." Publimetro and Billboard Argentina also found the track "emotive" and "mysterious", respectively.

"Luna" received awards and nominations. The song won the 2024 Heat Latin Music Award for Best Viral Song, – along with other nominations for Best Collaboration and Song of the Year – and the Our Country Award for Best Urban Song. It later received nominations at the 25th Annual Latin Grammy Awards and the Los 40 Music Awards 2024 for the category of the latter's same name; nevertheless, it lost to Daddy Yankee's "Bonita" and Rvssian, Rauw Alejandro and Ayra Starr's "Santa", respectively. It also received a nomination for Global 200 Latin Song of the Year at the 2024 Billboard Latin Music Awards.

== Music video ==
Sebastián Sánchez directed the music video for "Luna", which was released on YouTube on March 6, 2024. After the release, Feid thanked his fans, who requested the video excitedly, "for taking this song so far. We made this video thinking of you, we gave it all the love possible." It begins with him running in the desert and singing the song around a car with Jacob at his side. Depicting a broken relationship, the video shows a woman getting dressed, walking inside her house and hiring three gang members to shoot her partner (played by Feid), who tried to fix things with her by carrying orange gerberas. A time loop occurs, and the same things almost happen again, but the man survives and wakes up at a hospital at the end of the clip without memory of his past relationship with his girlfriend. According to Infobae's Lina Muñoz Medina, the plot "addresses the theme of love and hope under adverse circumstances, generating significant emotional resonance among viewers."

== Commercial performance ==
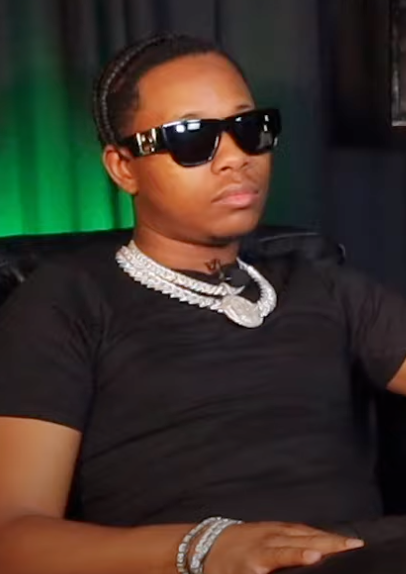
"Luna" became ATL Jacob's first top-ten entry on the Billboard Global Excl. US chart.

"Luna" topped national charts in Bolivia, Colombia, Costa Rica, Ecuador, Peru, Puerto Rico, and Uruguay and charted in the top ten of singles charts in El Salvador (2), Guatemala (2), Honduras (2), Nicaragua (2), Chile (3), Panama (4), Argentina (5), and the Dominican Republic (9). In Spain, it reached number one and received a 7× Platinum certification from the Productores de Música de España (PROMUSICAE) for selling 420,000 equivalent units. In Paraguay, the song topped the weekly and the monthly national charts simultaneously. In Portugal, it peaked at number 35 and attained a double platinum certification from the Associação Fonográfica Portuguesa (AFP).

In the United States, the song peaked at number two on the Billboard Bubbling Under Hot 100 issued for June 7, 2024. On April 27, it peaked at number one o the Latin Rhythm Airplay chart. On May 4, it climbed from number two to number one on the Latin Airplay chart, increasing to 10.73 million audience impressions. As a result, it became the Jacob's first and Feid's seventh number one on the chart, respectively. It also climbed one spot to number eight on the Hot Latin Songs chart in the same week, despite a decrease of 6% to 3.5 million streams. The Recording Industry Association of America (RIAA) certified the single quadruple Platinum in the Latin field, which denotes 240,000 units based on sales and track-equivalent on-demand streams.

The song debuted at 184 on the Billboard Global Excl. US chart issued for December 16, 2023. On January 20, 2024, it had jumped 13 spots to number 10 on Global Excl. US, being a new entry at the top ten on the chart with The Weeknd, Jennie, and Lily-Rose Depp's "One of the Girls" due to an increase of 20% to 30 million streams outside the US compared to the previous week. Two weeks later, the song climbed to number four, with streams increasing 11% to 41.5 million, making it their first top-five entry on the chart.

== Live performances and versions ==
In 2024, Feid performed "Luna" live for the first time in his shows at Lollapalooza Chile, Lollapalooza Argentina, and Festival Estéreo Picnic. It was later included on the set list of his headlining concert tours: Ferxxocalipsis World Tour (2024), Europe Fastest Tour (2025) and Falxo Tour (2026). He also performed the song at the 2024 Copa América opening ceremony on June 20 a few minutes before 20:00 ET at the Mercedes-Benz Stadium in Atlanta, Georgia, being the only song that Feid sang. His performance depicted him wearing a black sports outfit on a stage set in a fluorescent green scene, Feid was surrounded by dancers and drummers with flags and outfits representing his artistic theme. After the song finished, the championship edition's pet, Capitán, entered the field with dancers wearing United States flag-inspired outfits. The show ended with the appearance of the Argentina and Canada flags which included Sergio Agüero holding the championship's trophy. Although Colombian television channels had presented the show without problems, the show was criticized for transmission failures to outside networks as well as its short length. In 2025, Feid performed the song at his "Coffee Party" performance series, the Los 40 Music Awards 2025 and Austin City Limits Music Festival.

On January 16, 2024, Feid published, via Instagram, an acoustic version of "Luna" without pitch correction, accompanied by Pablo Mejía playing the guitar and surrounded by mountains. In June, he tagged the Puerto Rican singer Don Omar on his Instagram post and stories, suggesting a remix for the song with the "King Kong", but he did not receive a response. On July 17, Omar appeared on an interview on the YouTube channel Chocolate Radio TV, wherein he revealed that he could not accept the invitation because he was unable to continue his own concert tour due to a cancerous tumor diagnosed in his left kidney.

== Credits and personnel ==
Credits are adapted from the liner notes of Ferxxocalipsis.

Recording

- Recorded at Art & Music Studios (Milan)
- Mastered at 24k Mastering

Personnel

- Feid (Salomón Villada) – vocals, songwriter
- ATL Jacob – producer, background vocals
- Hendrix Smoke – producer
- EVRGRN – producer
- 254Bodi – producer
- FritzOnDaTrack – producer
- Rodolfo Ramos – artists and repertoire
- Wain – mix, mastering and recording engineer

== Charts ==
=== Weekly charts ===
Weekly chart performance for "Luna"
Chart (2023–2025)	Peak position
Argentina Hot 100 (Billboard)	5
Bolivia (Billboard)	1
Bolivia Airplay (Monitor Latino)	2
Brazil Latin Airplay (Crowley Charts)	3
Central America Airplay (Monitor Latino)	1
Central America + Caribbean Streaming (FONOTICA)	2
Chile (Billboard)	3
Chile Airplay (Monitor Latino)	1
Colombia (Billboard)	1
Colombia Airplay (National-Report)	1
Colombia Hot 100 (Billboard)	37
Costa Rica Airplay (Monitor Latino)	1
Costa Rica Streaming (FONOTICA)	1
Dominican Republic Airplay (Monitor Latino)	9
Ecuador (Billboard)	1
Ecuador Airplay (Monitor Latino)	1
El Salvador International (ASAP EGC)	2
Global 200 (Billboard)	12
Guatemala Airplay (Monitor Latino)	2
Honduras Airplay (Monitor Latino)	2
Mexico (Billboard)	15
Mexico Airplay (Monitor Latino)	12
Nicaragua Airplay (Monitor Latino)	2
Panama Airplay (Monitor Latino)	3
Panama International Streaming (PRODUCE)	4
Paraguay Airplay (Monitor Latino)	1
Peru (Billboard)	1
Peru Airplay (Monitor Latino)	1
Portugal (AFP)	35
Puerto Rico Airplay (Monitor Latino)	1
Spain (PROMUSICAE)	1
Uruguay Airplay (Monitor Latino)	1
US Bubbling Under Hot 100 (Billboard)	2
US Hot Latin Songs (Billboard)	5
US Latin Airplay (Billboard)	1
US Latin Rhythm Airplay (Billboard)	1
Venezuela Airplay (Monitor Latino)	18

=== Monthly charts ===
Monthly chart performance for "Luna"
Chart (2024)	Peak position
Panama Streaming (PRODUCE)	1
Paraguay Airplay (SGP)	1
Uruguay Streaming (CUD)	5

=== Year-end charts ===
2024 year-end chart performance for "Luna"
Chart (2024)	Position
Argentina Airplay (Monitor Latino)	14
Bolivia Airplay (Monitor Latino)	1
Central America Airplay (Monitor Latino)	1
Chile Airplay (Monitor Latino)	7
Colombia Airplay (Monitor Latino)	2
Costa Rica (FONOTICA)	2
Dominican Republic Airplay (Monitor Latino)	7
Ecuador Airplay (Monitor Latino)	1
El Salvador International (ASAP EGC)	2
Global 200 (Billboard)	32
Guatemala Airplay (Monitor Latino)	10
Honduras Airplay (Monitor Latino)	2
Mexico Airplay (Monitor Latino)	11
Nicaragua Airplay (Monitor Latino)	13
Panama Airplay (Monitor Latino)	2
Paraguay Airplay (Monitor Latino)	1
Peru Airplay (Monitor Latino)	1
Portugal (AFP)	69
Puerto Rico Airplay (Monitor Latino)	13
Spain (PROMUSICAE)	2
Uruguay (CUD)	4
US Hot Latin Songs (Billboard)	12
US Latin Airplay (Billboard)	6
US Latin Rhythm Airplay (Billboard)	3
Venezuela Airplay (Monitor Latino)	36

2025 year-end chart performance for "Luna"
Chart (2025)	Position
Argentina Airplay (Monitor Latino)	95
Bolivia Airplay (Monitor Latino)	38
Central America Airplay (Monitor Latino)	24
Global 200 (Billboard)	148

== Certifications ==
Certifications for "Luna"
Region	Certification	Certified units/sales
Italy (FIMI)	Gold	100,000^{‡}
Portugal (AFP)	2× Platinum	20,000^{‡}
Spain (Promusicae)	7× Platinum	420,000^{‡}
United States (RIAA)	4× Platinum (Latin)	240,000^{‡}
Streaming
Central America (CFC)	Diamond	35,000,000^{†}
^{‡} Sales+streaming figures based on certification alone.^{†} Streaming-only figures based on certification alone.

== Release history ==
Release date and format(s) for "Luna"
Region	Date	Format(s)	Label	Ref.
Italy	March 1, 2024	Airplay	Universal Latino	

== See also ==
- List of best-selling singles in Spain
- List of number-one singles of 2024 (Spain)
- List of Billboard Hot Latin Songs and Latin Airplay number ones of 2024
- List of Billboard Latin Rhythm Airplay number ones of 2024
