= Balvin =

Balvin is a surname. Notable people with the surname include:

- František Balvín (1915–2003), Czech cross-country skier
- J Balvin (born 1985), Colombian singer, songwriter, rapper and record producer
- Noe Balvin (born 1930), Colombian sports shooter
- Ondřej Balvín (born 1992), Czech basketball player
