= Paloma Mami =

American singer (born 1999)

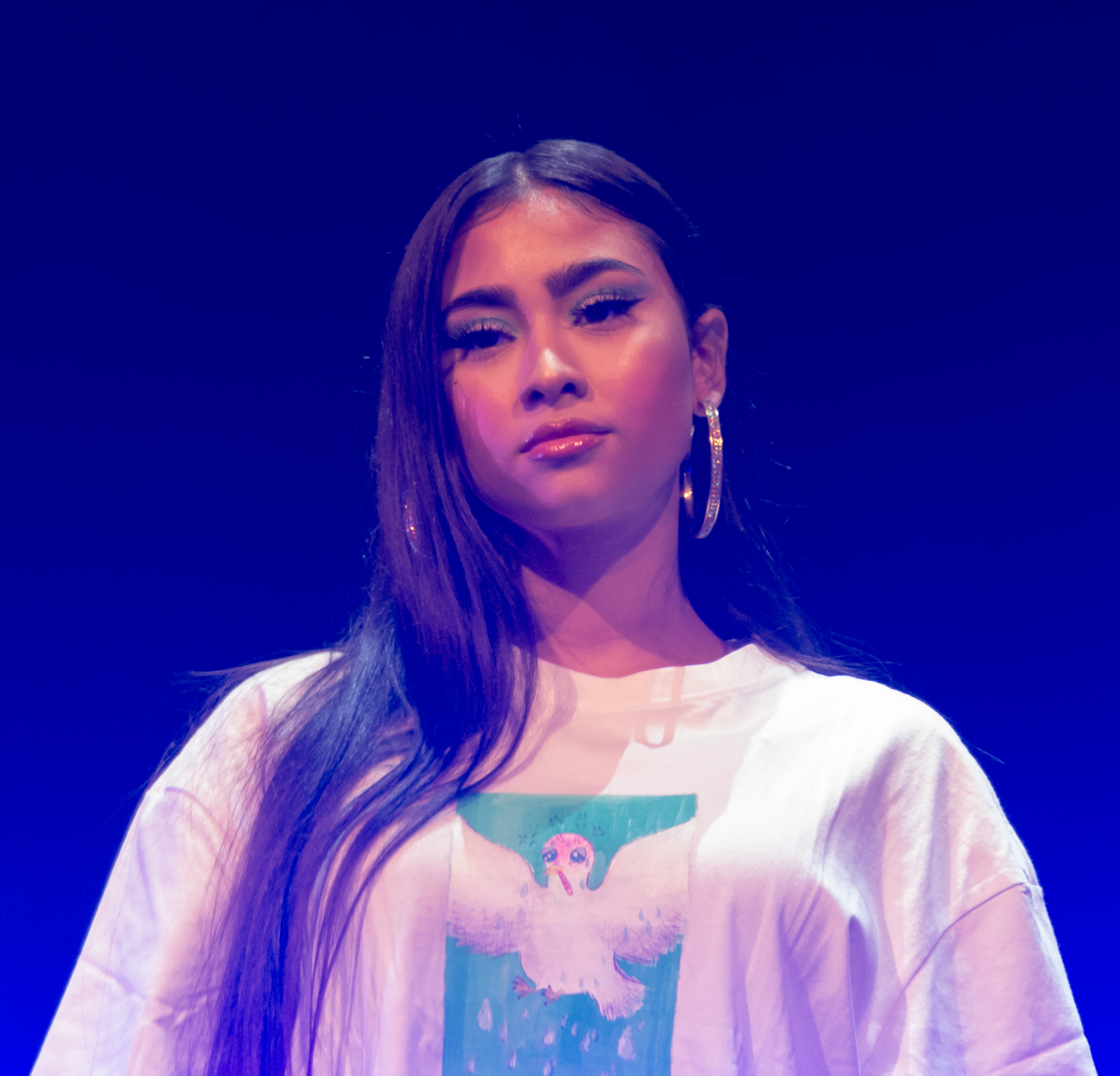
- Paloma Mami in 2020.

Background information
- Born: Paloma Rocío Castillo Astorga; November 11, 1999 (age 27); Manhattan, New York, U.S.
- Genres: Reggaeton; Latin R&B; Latin trap
- Occupation: Singer
- Instrument: Vocals
- Years active: 2018-present
- Labels: Sony Music Chile; Sony Latin; Double P
- Website: www.palomamamimusic.com

Paloma Rocío Castillo Astorga (born November 11, 1999), known professionally as Paloma Mami, is an American and Chilean singer. She began her musical career in 2018, and her first studio album, Sueños de Dalí, was released in March 2021. Her sophomore album, Códigos de Muñeka was released in July 2025.

== Early life ==
Paloma Castillo was born in Manhattan, New York, to Jorge Luis Eduardo Castillo Jiménez and Andrea Miriam Astorga Valdivia, both from Doñihue, Chile. She is of Mestiza descent. She has an older sister, Sofía, who works as a make-up artist. She chose her stage name, Paloma Mami, in high school, inspired by Drake's Instagram username. After her parents separated, Castillo, alongside her mother and sister, moved to Santiago, where she began her musical career.

== Career ==
In 2018, Castillo was a participant in the first season of the Chilean talent show, Rojo, el color del talento, on Televisión Nacional de Chile. Castillo left the show after two appearances. In June, Castillo independently released her debut single "Not Steady" with a music video. The song mixes styles including dancehall, trap, soul, and R&B. On September 2, she was the opening act for Arcángel at Teatro Caupolicán. The following month, she signed with Sony Music Latin, becoming the first Chilean artist to sign with the label. In December, she released the single "No Te Enamores", followed by her third single "Fingías" in March 2019. Later in 2019, she released singles "Don't Talk About Me", "No Te Debí Besar" in collaboration with rapper C. Tangana, and "Mami", which would serve as the first single to her debut album.

On April 30, 2020, Castillo released single "Goteo", which was included in Rolling Stone's Latin music pick of the week. On October 16, she featured on Major Lazer's single "QueLoQue". On November 2, she released "For Ya", the third single to her upcoming debut album. On February 18, 2021, she released "Religiosa", the fourth and final prerelease single to the album. Castillo's debut album Sueños de Dalí was released on March 18, 2021. On June 10, Castillo released "Qué Rico Fuera" with singer Ricky Martin. On September 28, Castillo was announced as a nominee for Best New Artist at the 22nd Annual Latin Grammy Awards. On October 21, she released the single "Cosas De La Vida".

On November 23, 2022, Castillo featured on Junior H's album Contingente for the song "Veneno". On December 8, Castillo collaborated with Chilean rappers Pailita and El Jordan 23 for the song "Síntomas de Soltera" (stylized in all caps except for the letter 'í'), which would serve as the first prerelease single for her second album. On January 12, 2023, she released "Nopalatele" (stylized in all caps) with Chilean rappers King Savagge and Ak4:20. On October 19, she released the single "COPY+PASTE".

In 2024, Castillo released "Dosis" with Marcianeke and ITHAN NY, followed by features for Prince Royce's "Morfina" and Pablito Pesadilla's "L0JI" and her single "Mi Kama", with "Dosis" and "Mi Kama" serving as the second and third singles to her second album.

On May 8, 2025, Castillo released "Hakia" as the fourth single for her second album. On May 25, Castillo served as a presenter for the 9th Crunchyroll Anime Awards in Tokyo, Japan. On July 2, Billboard announced the singer had signed with Double P Management. On July 10, Castillo released single "Astros" with a music video, and on July 11, she released her sophomore album "Códigos de Muñeka", which was noted by Billboard as part of the best new Latin music of the week.

== Artistry ==
Castillo defines her music as Latin R&B and urbano. She incorporates elements of pop and trap. She was inspired by Bad Bunny, Christina Aguilera, Amy Winehouse, Ella Fitzgerald, Rihanna, Drake and Aaliyah.

== Discography ==
=== Albums ===
| Title | Details | Peak chart positions | | Certifications |
| Title | Details | US Latin | US Latin Pop | Certifications |
|---|---|---|---|---|
| Sueños de Dalí | Released: March 18, 2021; Label: Sony Music Latin; Formats: CD, digital download, streaming | 32 | — | RIAA: Gold (Latin) |
| Códigos de Muñeka | Released: July 11, 2025; Label: Sony Music Latin; Formats: digital download, streaming | — | 12 | |

=== Singles ===
List of singles, peak chart positions, and certifications
| Title | Year | Peak chart positions | | | | | | | Certifications | Album |
| Title | Year | CHI | ARG | MEX | PR | SPA | URY | US Latin Airplay | Certifications | Album |
|---|---|---|---|---|---|---|---|---|---|---|
| "Not Steady" | 2018 | — | — | — | — | — | — | — | | Non-album singles |
| "No Te Enamores" | 2018 | 5 | — | — | — | — | — | — | RIAA: 3× Platinum (Latin) | Non-album singles |
| "Fingías" | 2019 | 4 | — | — | — | 81 | — | — | RIAA: 5× Platinum (Latin) | Non-album singles |
| "Don't Talk About Me" | 2019 | — | — | — | — | — | — | — | RIAA: Gold (Latin) | Non-album singles |
| "No Te Debí Besar" (with C. Tangana) | 2019 | 14 | — | — | — | 3 | — | — | RIAA: Platinum (Latin) | Non-album singles |
| "Mami" | 2019 | 4 | — | — | — | — | — | — | RIAA: Platinum (Latin) | Sueños de Dalí |
| "Goteo" | 2020 | 9 | — | — | — | 62 | — | — | RIAA: Platinum (Latin) | Sueños de Dalí |
| "For Ya" | 2020 | — | — | — | — | — | — | — | RIAA: Gold (Latin) | Sueños de Dalí |
| "Religiosa" | 2021 | — | — | — | — | — | — | — | RIAA: Gold (Latin) | Sueños de Dalí |
| "Qué Rico Fuera" (with Ricky Martin) | 2021 | 4 | 60 | 28 | 1 | — | 1 | 24 | RIAA: Gold (Latin) | Play |
| "Cosas de la vida" | 2021 | — | — | — | — | — | — | — | RIAA: Gold (Latin) | Non-album single |
| "Síntomas de Soltera" (with Pailita and El Jordan 23) | 2022 | 11 | — | — | — | — | — | — | | Códigos de Muñeka |
| "Nopalatele" (with King Savagge and Ak4:20) | 2023 | — | — | — | — | — | — | — | | WorKING |
| "COPY+PASTE" | 2023 | — | — | — | — | — | — | — | | Non-album single |
| "Dosis" | 2024 | — | — | — | — | — | — | — | | Códigos de Muñeka |
| "Mi Kama" | 2024 | — | — | — | — | — | — | — | | Códigos de Muñeka |
| "Hakia" | 2025 | — | — | — | — | — | — | — | | Códigos de Muñeka |
| "La Freak" | 2025 | — | — | — | — | — | — | — | | Códigos de Muñeka |
| "Ojo de Horus" | 2025 | — | — | — | — | — | — | — | | Códigos de Muñeka |
| "Sinkronizamos | 2025 | — | — | — | — | — | — | — | | Códigos de Muñeka |
| "Astros" | 2025 | — | — | — | — | — | — | — | | Códigos de Muñeka |
| "Exmaquina" | 2026 | — | — | — | — | — | — | — | | Non-album singles |
| "NOTA" (with Cris MJ) | 2026 | — | — | — | — | — | — | — | | Non-album singles |
"—" denotes a song did not chart.

=== Other charted or certified songs ===
List of singles, peak chart positions, and certifications
| Title | Year | Certifications | Album |
|---|---|---|---|
| "Traumada" | 2021 | RIAA: Gold (Latin) | Sueños de Dalí |

=== As featured artist ===
List of singles and certifications
| Title | Year | Peak chart positions | Certifications | Album |
| Title | Year | CHI | Certifications | Album |
|---|---|---|---|---|
| "QueLoQue" Major Lazer featuring Paloma Mami | 2020 | 17 | | Music Is the Weapon |
| "Ultra Solo Remix" (Polimá Westcoast and Pailita featuring Feid, Paloma Mami, and De La Ghetto) | 2022 | — | RIAA: 3× Platinum (Latin) | Non-album single |
| "Veneno" Junior H featuring Paloma Mami | 2022 | — | | Contingente |
| "Morfina" Prince Royce featuring Paloma Mami | 2024 | 16 | | Llamada Perdida |
| "L0JI" Pablito Pesadilla featuring Paloma Mami | 2024 | — | | Non-album single |

== Filmography ==
| Year | Name | Role | Notes |
|---|---|---|---|
| 2018 | Rojo, el color del talento | Herself | Season 1 (14 episodes) |

== Awards and nominations ==
Name of the award ceremony, year presented, category, nominee(s) of the award, and the result of the nomination
| Award ceremony | Year | Category | Nominee(s)/work(s) | Result | Ref. |
|---|---|---|---|---|---|
| Giga Awards | 2019 | Musical phenomenon | Herself | Won | |
| Pulsar Awards | 2019 | Song of the Year | "Not Steady" | Won | |
| MTV Millennial Awards | 2019 | Viral artist | Herself | Nominated | |
| Premios Juventud | 2019 | The New Urban Generation | Herself | Nominated | |
| Premios Tu Música Urbano | 2020 | Top Female Newcomer | Herself | Won | |
| Heat Latin Music Awards | 2020 | Best Artist Southern Region | Herself | Nominated | |
| Heat Latin Music Awards | 2020 | Musical Promise | Herself | Nominated | |
| Premio Lo Nuestro | 2020 | Female Urban Artist of the Year | Herself | Nominated | |
| Premio Lo Nuestro | 2020 | New Female Artist | Herself | Nominated | |
| Premios Musa | 2020 | Urban Artist of the Year | Herself | Won | |
| Premios Musa | 2020 | Song of the Year | "Mami" | Nominated | |
| Premios Musa | 2020 | Video of the Year | "Goteo" | Nominated | |
| Premio Lo Nuestro | 2021 | Female Urban Artist of the Year | Herself | Nominated | |
| Copihue de Oro | 2021 | Best Urban Music Singer | Herself | Won | |
| Copihue de Oro | 2021 | Artist of the Decade | Herself | Nominated | |
| Heat Latin Music Awards | 2021 | Best Artist Southern Region | Herself | Nominated | |
| Latin Grammy Awards | 2021 | Best New Artist | Herself | Nominated | |
| Premios Musa | 2021 | Album of the Year | "Sueños de Dalí" | Nominated | |
| Premios Musa | 2021 | International Collaboration of the Year | "Que Rico Fuera" (w/ Ricky Martin) | Nominated | |
| Premios Musa | 2021 | Pop Artist of the Year | Herself | Nominated | |
| Premios Musa | 2021 | Song of the Year | "Religiosa" | Nominated | |
| Los Premios la Junta | 2021 | Best Reggaeton Song | "Religiosa" | Won | |
| Los Premios la Junta | 2021 | Best Reggaeton Artist | Herself | Nominated | |
| Los Premios la Junta | 2022 | Song of the Year | "Ultra Solo Remix" | Won | |
| Premios Tu Música Urbano | 2022 | Top Female Artist | Herself | Nominated | |
| Premios Tu Música Urbano | 2022 | Album of the Year | Sueños de Dalí | Nominated | |
| Premios Tu Música Urbano | 2023 | Remix of the Year | "Ultra Solo Remix" | Nominated | |
