= Certificación Fonográfica Centroamericana =

Music certification organization in Central America

- Abbreviation: CFC
- Formation: 2021
- Purpose: Music certification
- Location: Costa Rica
- Website: cfc-musica.com

Certificación Fonográfica Centroamericana (CFC) is a music certification organization that represents the music industry in the Central American countries, Costa Rica, El Salvador, Guatemala, Panama, Honduras and Nicaragua. It is managed by a collaboration of the different music industry trade organization in the region, FONOTICA in Costa Rica, AGINPRO in Guatemala, ASAP EGC in El Salvador and PRODUCE in Panama, all of which are members of the International Federation of the Phonographic Industry.

== Certification levels and methodology ==
CFC awards certifications based on streaming only. The levels of certification are:

- Gold: 3,500,000 streams
- Platinum: 7,000,000 streams
- Diamond: 35,000,000 streams

== Highest-certified works ==
=== Albums ===
Updated as of April 2024
| Artist | Album | Certification date | Certification level |
|---|---|---|---|
| Karol G | KG0516 | 17 November 2021 | 2× Platinum |
| Feid | Ferxxocalipsis | 14 August 2024 | 2× Platinum |
| Feid | Feliz Cumpleaños Ferxxo Te Pirateamos el Álbum | 13 February 2023 | Platinum |
| Sebastián Yatra | Dharma | 19 January 2022 | Platinum |
| J Balvin | Jose | 10 February 2022 | Platinum |
| Rauw Alejandro | Afrodisíaco | 17 March 2022 | Platinum |
| Rauw Alejandro | Vice Versa | 17 March 2022 | Platinum |
| Farruko | La 167 | 6 April 2022 | Platinum |
| Manuel Turizo | Dopamina | 6 April 2022 | Platinum |
| Maluma | Don Juan | 4 February 2025 | Platinum |
| Billie Eilish | Hit Me Hard and Soft | 4 December 2025 | Platinum |
| Karol G | Tropicoqueta | 8 January 2026 | Platinum |

=== Singles ===
Updated as of April 2024
| Artist (s) | Single | Certification date | Certification level |
|---|---|---|---|
| Karol G | "Bichota" | March 17, 2022 | Diamond |
| Karol G & Nicki Minaj | "Tusa" | March 17, 2022 | Diamond |
| Rauw Alejandro | "Todo de Ti" | April 8, 2022 | Diamond |
| Boza | "Hecha Pa' Mi" | September 19, 2022 | Diamond |
| Ozuna, J Balvin & Chencho | "Una Locura" | September 19, 2022 | Diamond |
| Feid & Young Miko | "Classy 101" | November 23, 2023 | Diamond |
| Feid & ATL Jacob | "Luna" | August 14, 2024 | Diamond |
| Myke Towers | "Lala" | December 10, 2024 | Diamond |
| Óscar Maydon and Fuerza Regida | "Tu Boda" | May 2, 2025 | Diamond |
| Rvssian, Rauw Alejandro, Ayra Starr | "Santa" | May 2, 2025 | Diamond |
