= Polimá Westcoast =

Chilean rapper and singer (born 1997)

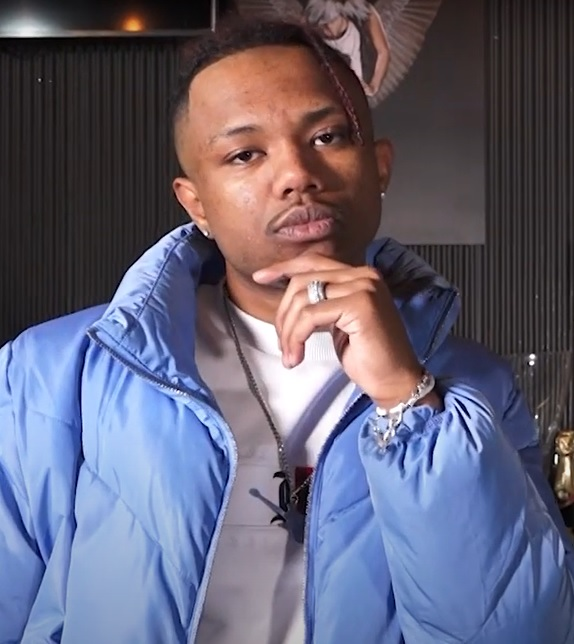
- Westcoast in 2019
- Born: Polimá Ngangu Eduardo Miguel Orellana; August 29, 1997 (age 28); Independencia, Santiago, Chile
- Occupations: Rapper; singer
- Years active: 2017–present
- Musical career
- Genres: Latin trap; reggaeton
- Instrument: Vocals
- Labels: Brokeboyz; Sony Music Chile; Sony Latin
- Website: polimawestcoast.com

Polimá Ngangu Eduardo Miguel Orellana (born August 29, 1997), known professionally as Polimá WestCoast, is a Chilean rapper and singer. His musical style is defined as Latin trap and reggaeton. He is one of the better known figures of the Chilean urban music scene that emerged in the late-2010s. He had his first underground hit with the song "Brokeboi" in 2018. In 2019 Polimá Westcoast presented a show at Lollapalooza Chile and toured the country soon after.

In 2022 he released the single "Ultra Solo" which charted #1 in the Chilean Billboard list by late June.

== Early life ==
Polimá Ngangu Eduardo Miguel Orellana was born on August 29, 1997, in Independencia, Santiago, Chile, as the only child of Natalia Orellana Canto, a Chilean dancer, and Jostario Miguel, an Angolan war refugee who came to South America escaping from the Angolan Civil War, with whom WestCoast has an estranged relationship. His name, Polimá Ngangu, are words from the Lingala language that mean "respect" and "intelligence", respectively. Since his youth Miguel was musically influenced by his mother and stepfather and at age 9 his passion for music started when he was part of a church choir. Although he managed to continue his studies in the second semester of 2015 at Hellen's College in Conchalí to later become an electrical engineering student, he abandoned them to dedicate himself completely to music.

== Career ==
Polimá WestCoast's first steps in music were in 2015, however, it wasn't until 2018 that his career would take a turn with his single "Brokeboi", which became an anthem for the movement known as Brokeboyz (a fast and worrieless life), which he formed together with other musicians from the Chilean urban scene. Later, WestCoast together with fellow Chilean artists Ceaese and Young Cister released the song "Te Quiero Ver", which has more than 50 million views on Spotify.

In 2019 WestCoast signed with Sony Music and released the album "Equilibrio" in duet with Young Cister, which led him to explore different musical terrains. That same year he released the single "MY BLOOD" with Chilean rapper Pablo Chill-E. WestCoast also performed with resounding success at the 2019 edition of Lollapalooza Chile, and subsequently went on an extensive tour across Chile.

In 2020 he released the single "Run Run Stop" with Argentine rapper Duki and in October 2021 he released "Bon Voyage" with German-Spanish actor and singer Arón Piper.

On February 15, 2022, he released the single "Ultra solo" with Chilean singer Pailita, the latter was a success on digital platforms such as Spotify, in which he collected more than 200 million views. On February 14, 2022, WestCoast alongside Pailita released the song "Ultra Solo", which was a commercial success and which on June 27, 2022, was included in the Billboard Global 200, occupying position number 9. On June 16, 2022, the remix of "Ultra Solo" was released, with the participation of Chilean-American singer Paloma Mami, Colombian singer-songwriter Feid, and Puerto Rican-American rapper De la Ghetto, which was also a success. WestCoast has stood out for being an opening act of Daddy Yankee's concerts in Santiago de Chile in 2022.

WestCoast performed at the LXII Viña del Mar International Song Festival in February 2023.
