= Ferxxocalipsis =

EP by Feid
- Released: December 1, 2023
- Genre: Reggaeton
- Length: 25:39
- Language: Spanish
- Label: Universal Latino
- Producer: Wain; Jowan; Pardo; Ily Wonder; G's on the Beats; T.Y. Jake; Cubeatz; Klimperboy; ATL Jacob; Sky Rompiendo; Taiko; Fase 29; MikeFly; Caleb Calloway; Julia Lewis; Mauro

Feid chronology
Mor, No Le Temas a la Oscuridad (2023)	Ferxxocalipsis (2023)	Manifesting 20-05 (2024)

Singles from Ferxxocalipsis
- 1. "Classy 101" Released: March 31, 2023; 2. "La Vuelta" Released: November 30, 2023; 3. "Luna" Released: March 1, 2024; 4. "Alakran" Released: March 13, 2024; 5. "Yo AK" Released: May 1, 2024; 6. "Cuál Es Esa" Released: May 3, 2024

Ferxxocalipsis is the third extended play (EP) by Colombian singer and songwriter Feid. It was released on December 1, 2023, by Universal Music Latino. It contains features with Mañas Ru-Fino, Pirlo, ATL Jacob, Jhay P and Young Miko.

== Background and release ==
After the release of his last album, Mor, No Le Temas a la Oscuridad, in October and November of 2023, Feid shared snippets of the new EP in his social media pages. Then, he officially announced the release date of the EP, scheduled for December 1, 2023.

== Singles ==
"Classy 101" with Puerto Rican singer Young Miko was released as the debut single on March 31, 2023, it was a huge success globally, debuting and peaking across several charts.

On November 30, 2023, one day before the release of the EP, "La Vuelta", with Colombian rapper Mañas Ru-Fino, was released as the second single.

On March 1, 2024, "Luna" with ATL Jacob was released as the third single. The song also received great commercial success. It was preceded only about two weeks later by the fourth single "Alakran", released on March 13.

"Yo AK" with Jhay P, was released on May 1, as the fifth single. Then, just two days later, it was preceded by the sixth single "Cuál Es Esa" with Colombian singer Pirlo, on May 3.

== Track listing ==
Ferxxocalipsis track listing
No.	Title	Writer(s)	Producer(s)	Length
1.	"Alakran"	Esteban Higuita Estrada; Salomón Villada Hoyos	Wain	1:31
2.	"50 Palos"	Villada Hoyos; Johan Esteban Espinosa Cuervo; Andrés David Restrepo Echavarría; Luis Miguel Pardo	Jowan; Pardo	2:48
3.	"La Vuelta" (with Mañas Ru-Fino)	Villada Hoyos; Julián Cañas Molina; Andrés Uribe Marín	Ily Wonder	2:02
4.	"Cuál Es Esa" (with Pirlo)	Herrera; Iván Andrés Galindo; Jhon Anderson Sánchez Cajares	G's on the Beats	2:53
5.	"Interlude"	Higuita Estrada; Villada Hoyos; Kevin Gomringer; Tim Gomringer; Jake Moon Hogan; Simón Gaudes	Wain; T.Y. Jake; Cubeatz; Klimperboy	1:44
6.	"Luna" (with ATL Jacob)	Villada Hoyos	ATL Jacob
7.	"Esquirla"	Higuita Estrada; Villada Hoyos	Wain	2:28
8.	"Desquite"	Villada Hoyos; Alejandro Ramírez Suárez; Nicolás Jaña Galleguillo	Sky Rompiendo; Taiko	2:14
9.	"Yo AK" (with Jhay P)	Villada Hoyos; Juan Pablo García Vélez; Juan David Castro; Jerónimo Uribe Bohorquez; Miguel Ángel Mosquera Trujillo	Fase 29; MikeFly	3:26
10.	"Classy 101" (with Young Miko)	Higuita Estrada; Villada Hoyos; María Victoria Ramírez de Arellano; Héctor C. López; Diego A. López Crespo; Benjamín Falik; Miguel A. Montoya	Caleb Calloway; Julia Lewis; Mauro	3:16
Total length:				25:39

== Charts ==
Weekly chart performance for Ferxxocalipsis
Chart (2023)	Peak position
Spanish Albums (Promusicae)	2
Swiss Albums (Schweizer Hitparade)	95
US Billboard 200	123
US Latin Rhythm Albums (Billboard)	5
US Top Latin Albums (Billboard)	9

== Certifications ==
Certifications for Ferxxocalipsis
Region	Certification	Certified units/sales
Spain (Promusicae)	Gold	20,000^{‡}
United States (RIAA)	Platinum (Latin)	60,000^{‡}
Streaming
Central America (CFC)	2× Platinum	14,000,000^{†}
^{‡} Sales+streaming figures based on certification alone.^{†} Streaming-only figures based on certification alone.
