= Cali Pachanguero =

Song by Grupo Niche
- Released: 1984
- Genre: Salsa/pachanga
- Songwriter: Jairo Varela

"Cali Pachanguero" (translation: Cali party-lover or Cali party animal) is a salsa song performed by Grupo Niche and written by the group's founder Jairo Varela. Released in 1984 on the album No hay quinto malo, (Note: "No hay quinto malo" translated as "There is no fifth bad" is a Spanish proverb of optimism meaning that in the end the situation will change to good.) it has been called an anthem of Colombian salsa.

The song has been recognized by multiple media outlets as one of the greatest songs in Colombian history:

- It was selected by Hip Latina in 2017 as one of the "13 Old School Songs Every Colombian Grew Up Listening To"; the publication called it "a staple of many a lit fête."
- In its list of the top ten Colombian songs, El Heraldo rated Cali Pachanguero at No. 9.
- It has also been ranked at number 27 in Billboard magazine's list of the 50 best Latin songs in history.
- It was listed on the "15 Best Salsa Songs Ever" by the same publication in 2018.
- Viva Music Colombia rated the song No. 17 on its list of the 100 most important Colombian songs of all time.
- In its list of the 50 best Colombian songs of all time, El Tiempo, Colombia's most widely circulated newspaper, ranked the version of the song recorded by Grupo Niche at No. 40.

The song's title is a homage to the influence of the pachanga genre in Cali.
