= Mor, No Le Temas a la Oscuridad =

Studio album by Feid
- Released: 29 September 2023
- Genre: Reggaeton
- Length: 45:06
- Language: Spanish
- Label: Universal Latino
- Producer: Sky Rompiendo; Wain; Jowan; Taiko; Icon; Feid; CashMoneyAP; Daniel Moras; Wizzle; Rolo; Cupido

Feid chronology
Sixdo (2022)	Mor, No Le Temas a la Oscuridad (2023)	Ferxxocalipsis (2023)

Singles from Mor, No Le Temas a la Oscuridad
- 1. "Niña Bonita" Released: 21 April 2023; 2. "Vente Conmigo" Released: 4 August 2023; 3. "Ferxxo 151" Released: 25 August 2023; 4. "Bubalú" Released: 22 September 2023; 5. "Luces de Tecno" Released: 29 September 2023

Mor, No Le Temas a la Oscuridad (Spanish for Dear, Don't Be Afraid of the Darkness) is the sixth studio album by Colombian singer and songwriter Feid. It was released on September 29, 2023, through Universal Music Latino. It features collaborations with Sean Paul, Ñengo Flow, Icon, Rema, Ryan Castro, Young Cister, Pailita and Cupido.

== Background and release ==
On August 25, 2023, Feid announced the title of the album and its track list, and it was scheduled to be released on September 29 of that same year, in addition to simultaneously releasing the single and video clip "Ferxxo 151" as the third preview of the production.

== Singles ==
The first single from this album, "Niña Bonita" with Jamaican singer Sean Paul, was released on April 21, 2023. The second single, "Vente Conmigo" was released on August 4, 2023. The third single, "Ferxxo 151" with Icon, was released on August 25, 2023. The fourth single, "Bubalú" with Nigerian singer Rema, was released on September 22, 2023.

== Track listing ==
Mor, No Le Temas a la Oscuridad track listing
No.	Title	Writer(s)	Producer(s)	Length
1.	"Ferxxo 30"	Salomón Villada	Feid	2:54
2.	"Vol. 2"	Villada; Andrés Restrepo	Sky Rompiendo; Wain; Jowan	1:11
3.	"Vente Conmigo"	Villada	Sky Rompiendo	3:06
4.	"Niña Bonita" (with Sean Paul)	Villada; Sean Paul Henriques	Sky Rompiendo; Taiko	3:07
5.	"Gangsters y Pistolas" (with Ñengo Flow)	Villada; Alejandro Ramírez; Edwin Vázquez	Jowan; Sky Rompiendo	2:51
6.	"Ferxxo 151" (with Icon)	Villada; Restrepo	Icon; Jowan	3:15
7.	"Bubalú" (with Rema)	Villada; Restrepo; Divine Ikubor	Sky Rompiendo	3:48
8.	"Ritmo de Medallo" (with Ryan Castro)	Villada; Bryan Castro	Jowan; Sky Rompiendo; Wain	1:59
9.	"Ferxxo Edition"	Villada; Ramírez	Sky Rompiendo; Jowan	2:42
10.	"Nx Tx Sientas Solx"	Villada	Sky Rompiendo; Wain	2:00
11.	"Luces de Tecno"	Villada; Restrepo	Sky Rompiendo; Wain	2:44
12.	"Ey Chory"	Villada	Feid; CashMoneyAP; Sky Rompiendo; Daniel Moras; Wizzle	2:58
13.	"Velocidad Crucero"	Villada; Restrepo	Jowan	2:17
14.	"Románticos de Lunes"	Villada; Restrepo; Daniel Taborda	Jowan; Sky Rompiendo; Wain; Rolo	4:04
15.	"El Único Tema del Ferxxo" (with Young Cister and Pailita)	Villada; Esteban Cisterna; Carlos Raín	Wain	3:04
16.	"Privilegios" (with Cupido)	Daniel Pedraja; Villada; Restrepo; Taborda	Cupido; Wain	3:06
Total length:				45:06

== Charts ==
=== Weekly charts ===
Weekly chart performance for Mor, No Le Temas a la Oscuridad
Chart (2023)	Peak position
Spanish Albums (PROMUSICAE)	2
Swiss Albums (Schweizer Hitparade)	64
US Billboard 200	31
US Top Latin Albums (Billboard)	4
US Latin Rhythm Albums (Billboard)	3

=== Year-end charts ===
Year-end chart performance for Mor, No Le Temas a la Oscuridad
Chart (2023)	Position
Spanish Albums (PROMUSICAE)	32

== Certifications ==
Certifications for Mor, No Le Temas a la Oscuridad
Region	Certification	Certified units/sales
Spain (PROMUSICAE)	Platinum	40,000^{‡}
United States (RIAA)	Platinum (Latin)	60,000^{‡}
Streaming
Central America (CFC)	Gold	3,500,000^{†}
^{‡} Sales+streaming figures based on certification alone.^{†} Streaming-only figures based on certification alone.
