= Feid =

Colombian singer and songwriter (born 1992)

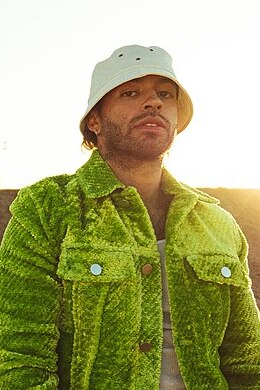
- Feid during the music video for "Castigo" in 2022

Background information
- Also known as: Ferxxo
- Born: Salomón Villada Hoyos; 19 August 1992 (age 34); Medellín, Colombia
- Genres: Reggaeton; Latin trap; electronic
- Occupations: Singer; songwriter
- Instruments: Vocals; piano; guitar
- Years active: 2015–present
- Label: Grabaciones Los Poderosos

Salomón Villada Hoyos (born 19 August 1992), better known by his stage names Feid and Ferxxo, is a Colombian singer, songwriter, and record producer. Born in Medellín, Colombia, he has worked with several well-known singers including Bad Bunny, J Balvin, Sebastián Yatra, Manuel Turizo, Madonna, Maluma and Karol G.

== Background ==
Feid was born on 19 August 1992 in Medellín, Colombia. He is the son of Berta Lucía Hoyos, a preschool teacher and psychologist, and Jorge Mario Villada, a university professor of Arts, Feid is of Mestizo and Syrian descent. His sister Manuela Villada Hoyos is studying graphic design. Feid took music extension courses offered by the University of Antioquia in Medellín.

In his childhood he learned the clarinet, which he later abandoned after deciding to begin singing. He took singing classes and also sang in front of his friends. He was in the college choir. He finally focused on creating reggaeton music and sang at college parties, birthday parties, and reunions. He prefers hip-hop and R&B and listens to artists like Drake, T-Pain, and Chris Brown. However, he became a reggaeton artist because he felt the genre was more popular with younger generations.

Feid worked with several well-known artists, like J Balvin and Sebastián Yatra. He also helped write the popular reggaeton song by J Balvin called "Ginza". Feid released the song "Dorado" on 10 July 2020; he collaborated with Italian musicians Mahmood and Sfera Ebbasta on the song.

In 2026, Feid collaborated with Madonna, on the track "Read My Lips", as part of the latter's fifteenth studio album Confessions II. On June 26, 2026, they released a "FIFA version" of the song, in recognition of the 2026 FIFA World Cup.

== Discography ==
Studio albums

- Así Como Suena (2017)
- 19 (2019)
- Ferxxo (Vol 1: M.O.R) (2020)
- Inter Shibuya – La Mafia (2021)
- Feliz Cumpleaños Ferxxo Te Pirateamos el Álbum (2022)
- Mor, No Le Temas a la Oscuridad (2023)
- Ferxxo Vol X: Sagrado (2025)
- El Green Print: La Saga (Disc 1) – Feid vs Ferxxo (2026)
- El Green Print: La Saga (Disc 2) – EL CLUB DE LAS 19 FLORES (2026)

== Concert tours ==
- Ferxxo Nitro Jam Tour (2023)
- Ferxxocalipsis World Tour (2024)

== Awards and nominations ==
Award	Year	Category	Nominated work	Result	Ref.
ASCAP Latin Awards	2021	Winning Songs	"Porfa" (with Justin Quiles)	Won	
ASCAP Latin Awards	2024	Artist of the Year	Feid	Won	
ASCAP Latin Awards	2024	Winning Songs	"Classy 101" (with Young Miko)	Won	
ASCAP Latin Awards	2024	Winning Songs	"Feliz Cumpleaños Ferxxo"	Won	
ASCAP Latin Awards	2024	Winning Songs	"Hey Mor" (with Ozuna)	Won	
ASCAP Latin Awards	2024	Winning Songs	"Niña Bonita" (with Sean Paul)	Won	
ASCAP Latin Awards	2024	Winning Songs	"Normal"	Won	
ASCAP Latin Awards	2024	Winning Songs	"Yandel 150" (with Yandel)	Won	
Billboard Music Awards	2024	Top Latin Song	"Perro Negro" (with Bad Bunny)	Nominated	
Billboard Latin Music Awards	2023	Hot Latin Songs Artist of the Year, Male	Feid	Nominated	
Billboard Latin Music Awards	2023	Latin Rhythm Artist of the Year, Solo	Feid	Nominated	
Billboard Latin Music Awards	2023	Global 200 Latin Artist of the Year	Feid	Nominated	
Billboard Latin Music Awards	2023	Airplay Song of the Year	"Yandel 150" (with Yandel)	Nominated	
Billboard Latin Music Awards	2023	Latin Rhythm Airplay Song of the Year	"Yandel 150" (with Yandel)	Nominated	
Billboard Latin Music Awards	2023	Latin Rhythm Album of the Year	Feliz Cumpleaños Ferxxo Te Pirateamos el Álbum	Nominated	
Billboard Latin Music Awards	2024	Global 200 Latin Artist of the Year	Feid	Nominated	
Billboard Latin Music Awards	2024	Hot Latin Songs Artist of the Year, Male	Feid	Nominated	
Billboard Latin Music Awards	2024	Top Latin Albums Artist of the Year, Male	Feid	Nominated	
Billboard Latin Music Awards	2024	Latin Rhythm Artist of the Year, Solo	Feid	Nominated	
Billboard Latin Music Awards	2024	Global 200 Latin Song of the Year	"Perro Negro" (with Bad Bunny)	Nominated	
Billboard Latin Music Awards	2024	Hot Latin Song of the Year	"Perro Negro" (with Bad Bunny)	Nominated	
Billboard Latin Music Awards	2024	Hot Latin Song of the Year, Vocal Event	"Perro Negro" (with Bad Bunny)	Nominated	
Billboard Latin Music Awards	2024	Streaming Song of the Year	"Perro Negro" (with Bad Bunny)	Nominated	
Billboard Latin Music Awards	2024	Airplay Song of the Year	"Perro Negro" (with Bad Bunny)	Nominated	
Billboard Latin Music Awards	2024	Global 200 Latin Song of the Year	"Luna" (with ATL Jacob)	Nominated	
Billboard Latin Music Awards	2024	Latin Rhythm Album of the Year	Ferxxocalipsis	Nominated	
Billboard Latin Music Awards	2025	Latin Rhythm Artist of the Year, Solo	Feid	Nominated	
Billboard Latin Music Awards	2026	Latin Rhythm Song of the Year	"Se Lo Juro Mor"	Pending	
Grammy Awards	2025	Best Música Urbana Album	Ferxxocalipsis	Nominated	
iHeartRadio Music Awards	2024	Latin Pop/Reggaeton Artist of the Year	Feid	Nominated	
iHeartRadio Music Awards	2025	Latin Pop/Urban Song of the Year	"Brickell" (with Yandel)	Nominated	
iHeartRadio Music Awards	2025	Latin Pop/Urban Song of the Year	"Perro Negro" (with Bad Bunny)	Won	
iHeartRadio Music Awards	2025	Latin Pop/Reggaeton Artist of the Year	Feid	Won	
iHeartRadio Music Awards	2025	Best Music Video	"Luna" (with ATL Jacob)	Nominated	
iHeartRadio Fiesta Latina	2024	Corazon Latino Award	Feid	Won	
Heat Latin Music Awards	2022	Best New Artist	Feid	Nominated	
Heat Latin Music Awards	2022	Best Artist Andean Region	Feid	Nominated	
Heat Latin Music Awards	2023	Best Male Artist	Feid	Won	
Heat Latin Music Awards	2023	Best Urban Artist	Feid	Nominated	
Heat Latin Music Awards	2023	Best Video	"Le Pido a Dios"	Nominated	
Heat Latin Music Awards	2023	Best Collaboration	"Hey Mor" (with Ozuna)	Nominated	
Heat Latin Music Awards	2023	Best Collaboration	"La Inocente" (with Mora)	Nominated	
Heat Latin Music Awards	2023	Song of the Year	"Feliz Cumpleaños Ferxxo"	Nominated	
Heat Latin Music Awards	2024	Best Male Artist	Feid	Won	
Heat Latin Music Awards	2024	Best Urban Artist	Feid	Nominated	
Heat Latin Music Awards	2024	Composer of the Year	Feid	Won	
Heat Latin Music Awards	2024	Fandom of the Year	Feid	Nominated	
Heat Latin Music Awards	2024	Best Music Video	"Privilegios" (with Cupido)	Nominated	
Heat Latin Music Awards	2024	Best Collaboration	"Perro Negro" (with Bad Bunny)	Nominated	
Heat Latin Music Awards	2024	Best Collaboration	"Luna" (with ATL Jacob)	Nominated	
Heat Latin Music Awards	2024	Song of the Year	"Luna" (with ATL Jacob)	Nominated	
Heat Latin Music Awards	2024	Best Viral Song	"Luna" (with ATL Jacob)	Won	
Heat Latin Music Awards	2024	Album of the Year	Ferxxocalipsis	Nominated	
Heat Latin Music Awards	2025	Best Male Artist	Feid	Won	
Heat Latin Music Awards	2025	Best Urban Artist	Feid	Won	
Heat Latin Music Awards	2025	Fandom of the Year	Feid	Nominated	
Heat Latin Music Awards	2025	Song of the Year	"Se Me Olvida" (with Maisak)	Nominated	
Heat Latin Music Awards	2025	Best Collaboration	"Se Me Olvida" (with Maisak)	Nominated	
Heat Latin Music Awards	2025	Best Collaboration	"Háblame Claro" (with Yandel)	Nominated	
Heat Latin Music Awards	2026	Best Male Artist	Feid	Pending	
Heat Latin Music Awards	2026	Best Urban Artist	Feid	Pending	
Heat Latin Music Awards	2026	Best Song for a Video Game, Series or Movie	"ESTOY PUTIAO" (with Sky Rompiendo & Dei V)	Pending	
Latin American Music Awards	2024	Artist of the Year	Feid	Nominated	
Latin American Music Awards	2024	Streaming Artist of the Year	Feid	Won	
Latin American Music Awards	2024	Global Latin Artist of the Year	Feid	Nominated	
Latin American Music Awards	2024	Favorite Urban Artist	Feid	Nominated	
Latin American Music Awards	2024	Song of the Year	"Yandel 150" (with Yandel)	Nominated	
Latin American Music Awards	2024	Collaboration of the Year	"Yandel 150" (with Yandel)	Won	
Latin American Music Awards	2024	Favorite Urban Song	"Yandel 150" (with Yandel)	Won	
Latin American Music Awards	2024	Global Latin Song of the Year	"Classy 101" (with Young Miko)	Won	
Latin American Music Awards	2024	Best Collaboration - Urban	"Classy 101" (with Young Miko)	Won	
Latin American Music Awards	2024	Best Collaboration - Urban	"Hey Mor" (with Ozuna)	Nominated	
Latin American Music Awards	2024	Collaboration Crossover of the Year	"Niña Bonita" (with Sean Paul)	Won	
Latin American Music Awards	2024	Album of the Year	Feliz Cumpleaños Ferxxo Te Pirateamos el Álbum	Nominated	
Latin Grammy Awards	2019	Best Urban Music Album	19	Nominated	
Latin Grammy Awards	2020	Best Urban Music Album	Ferxxo (Vol 1: M.O.R)	Nominated	
Latin Grammy Awards	2020	Best Reggaeton Performance	"Porfa" (with Justin Quiles)	Nominated	
Latin Grammy Awards	2022	Album of the Year	Aguilera (as producer and songwriter)	Nominated	
Latin Grammy Awards	2023	Best Urban Fusion/Performance	"Yandel 150" (with Yandel)	Nominated	
Latin Grammy Awards	2023	Best Reggaeton Performance	"Feliz Cumpleaños Ferxxo"	Nominated	
Latin Grammy Awards	2023	Best Reggaeton Performance	"Hey Mor" (with Ozuna)	Nominated	
Latin Grammy Awards	2023	Best Rap/Hip Hop Song	"Le Pido a Dios" (with DJ Premier)	Nominated	
Latin Grammy Awards	2023	Best Urban Music Album	Feliz Cumpleaños Ferxxo Te Pirateamos el Álbum	Nominated	
Latin Grammy Awards	2024	Best Reggaeton Performance	"Perro Negro" (with Bad Bunny)	Won	
Latin Grammy Awards	2024	Best Urban Music Album	Ferxxocalipsis	Nominated	
Latin Grammy Awards	2024	Best Urban Song	"El Cielo" (with Sky Rompiendo & Myke Towers)	Nominated	
Latin Grammy Awards	2024	Best Urban Song	"Luna" (with ATL Jacob)	Nominated	
LOS40 Music Awards	2022	Best New Latin Act	Feid	Nominated	
LOS40 Music Awards	2023	Best Latin Urban Act or Producer	Feid	Won	
LOS40 Music Awards	2023	Best Latin Album	Feliz Cumpleaños Ferxxo Te Pirateamos el Álbum	Nominated	
LOS40 Music Awards	2023	Best Latin Urban Collaboration	"Hey Mor" (with Ozuna)	Won	
LOS40 Music Awards	2023	Best Latin Urban Collaboration	"Classy 101" (with Young Miko)	Nominated	
LOS40 Music Awards	2023	Best Latin Urban Song	"Classy 101" (with Young Miko)	Won	
LOS40 Music Awards	2023	Best Latin Tour, Festival or Concert	Ferxxo Nitro Jam World Tour	Nominated	
LOS40 Music Awards	2024	Best Latin Urban Act	Feid	Nominated	
LOS40 Music Awards	2024	Best Latin Urban Song	"Luna" (with ATL Jacob)	Nominated	
LOS40 Music Awards	2024	Best Latin Urban Collaboration	"Offline" (with Young Miko)	Nominated	
LOS40 Music Awards	2024	Best Latin Tour, Festival or Concert	Ferxxocalipsis World Tour	Nominated	
LOS40 Music Awards	2025	Best Latin Urban Act	Feid	Nominated	
LOS40 Music Awards	2025	Best Latin Live Act	Feid	Nominated	
LOS40 Music Awards	2025	Colombian Phenomenon Award	Feid	Won	
LOS40 Music Awards	2025	Best Latin Collaboration	"X Ti" (with Kapo)	Nominated	
LOS40 Music Awards	2025	Best Latin Urban Collaboration	"Verano Rosa" (with Karol G)	Nominated	
LOS40 Music Awards	2025	Best Latin Music Video	"Se Lo Juro Mor"	Nominated	
LOS40 Music Awards	2025	Best Latin Album	FERXXO Vol X: Sagrado	Nominated	
LOS40 Music Awards	2025	Best Latin Tour, Festival or Concert	Fastest Tour	Won	
MTV Europe Music Awards	2022	Best Latin America Central Act	Feid	Nominated	
MTV Europe Music Awards	2023	Best Latin America Central Act	Feid	Won	
MTV Millennial Awards	2022	Flow Artist	Feid	Nominated	
MTV Millennial Awards	2023	MIAW Artist	Feid	Nominated	
MTV Millennial Awards	2023	Reggaeton Hit	"Yandel 150" (with Yandel)	Nominated	
MTV Millennial Awards	2023	Reggaeton Hit	"Hey Mor" (with Ozuna)	Nominated	
MTV Millennial Awards	2023	Reggaeton Hit	"Classy 101" (with Young Miko)	Nominated	
MTV Millennial Awards	2023	Couple Goals	Karol G and Feid	Nominated	
MTV Millennial Awards	2024	MIAW Artist	Feid	Nominated	
MTV Millennial Awards	2024	Bellakeo Supremo	"Fecha" (with Yandel)	Nominated	
MTV Millennial Awards	2024	Bellakeo Supremo	"Offline" (with Young Miko)	Nominated	
MTV Millennial Awards	2024	Collaboration of the Year	"Offline" (with Young Miko)	Nominated	
Premios Juventud	2020	The Quarantune	"Cuando Amanezca" (with Nibal, Justin Quiles and Danny Ocean)	Nominated	
Premios Juventud	2021	La Mezcla Perfecta (Song with the Best Collaboration)	"Porfa (Remix)" (with Justin Quiles, J Balvin, Maluma, Nicky Jam and Sech)	Nominated	
Premios Juventud	2022	Male Artist – On The Rise	Feid	Nominated	
Premios Juventud	2022	The Perfect Mix	"Mojando Asientos" (with Maluma)	Nominated	
Premios Juventud	2023	Best Urban Song	"Yandel 150" (with Yandel)	Nominated	
Premios Juventud	2023	Best Urban Mix	"Hey Mor" (with Ozuna)	Won	
Premios Juventud	2023	Best Urban Album – Male	Feliz Cumpleaños Ferxxo Te Pirateamos el Álbum	Nominated	
Premios Juventud	2024	OMG Collaboration	"Niña Bonita" (with Sean Paul)	Nominated	
Premios Juventud	2024	Best Urban Track	"Niña Bonita" (with Sean Paul)	Nominated	
Premios Juventud	2024	Best Urban Mix	"Bubalu" (with Rema)	Nominated	
Premios Juventud	2024	Best Urban Album	Mor, No Le Temas a La Oscuridad	Nominated	
Premios Juventud	2025	OMG Collaboration	"Dallax" (with Ty Dolla $ign)	Nominated	
Premios Juventud	2025	Best Urban Mix	"Gatitas Sandungueras Vol.1" (with Álvaro Díaz)	Nominated	
Premios Juventud	2025	Best Urban Track	"+57" (with Karol G, DFZM, Ovy On The Drums, J Balvin, Maluma, Ryan Castro & Blessd)	Nominated	
Premios Juventud	2026	Best Urban Rhythmic Song	"Verano Rosa" (with Karol G)	Won	
Premios Juventud	2026	Best Urban Track	"Se Lo Juro Mor"	Nominated	
Premios Juventud	2026	Best Pop/Rhythmic Song	"Cambiaré" (with Luis Fonsi)	Nominated	
Premios Lo Nuestro	2020	Remix of the Year	"Porfa (Remix)" (with Justin Quiles, J Balvin, Maluma, Nicky Jam and Sech)	Nominated	
Premios Lo Nuestro	2021	New Artist – Male	Feid	Nominated	
Premios Lo Nuestro	2023	Urban Collaboration of the Year	"Friki" (with Karol G)	Nominated	
Premios Lo Nuestro	2024	Artist of the Year	Feid	Nominated	
Premios Lo Nuestro	2024	Male Urban Artist of the Year	Feid	Won	
Premios Lo Nuestro	2024	Album of the Year	Feliz Cumpleaños Ferxxo Te Pirateamos el Álbum	Nominated	
Premios Lo Nuestro	2024	Urban Album of the Year	Feliz Cumpleaños Ferxxo Te Pirateamos el Álbum	Nominated	
Premios Lo Nuestro	2024	Remix of the Year	"Polaris Remix" (with Saiko, Quevedo & Mora)	Nominated	
Premios Lo Nuestro	2024	Urban Song of the Year	"Classy 101" (with Young Miko)	Won	
Premios Lo Nuestro	2024	Urban Song of the Year	"Hey Mor" (with Ozuna)	Nominated	
Premios Lo Nuestro	2024	Urban Collaboration of the Year	"Hey Mor" (with Ozuna)	Nominated	
Premios Lo Nuestro	2024	Urban/Pop Song of the Year	"Niña Bonita" (with Sean Paul)	Nominated	
Premios Lo Nuestro	2025	Artist of the Year	Feid	Nominated	
Premios Lo Nuestro	2025	Male Urban Artist of the Year	Feid	Won	
Premios Lo Nuestro	2025	Song of the Year	"Bubalu" (with Rema)	Nominated	
Premios Lo Nuestro	2025	Pop-Urban Collaboration of the Year	"Bubalu" (with Rema)	Nominated	
Premios Lo Nuestro	2025	Urban Collaboration of the Year	"Perro Negro" (with Bad Bunny)	Won	
Premios Lo Nuestro	2025	Urban Album of the Year	Ferxxocalipsis	Nominated	
Premios Lo Nuestro	2025	Tour of the Year	Ferxxxocalipsis Tour 2024	Nominated	
Premios Lo Nuestro	2026	Male Urban Artist of the Year	Feid	Nominated	
Premios Lo Nuestro	2026	Urban Song of the Year	"Háblame Claro" (with Yandel)	Nominated	
Premios Lo Nuestro	2026	Urban Album of the Year	Ferxxo Vol X: Sagrado	Won	
Premios Lo Nuestro	2026	Urban Collaboration of the Year	"+57" (with Karol G, DFZM, Ovy On The Drums, J Balvin, Maluma, Ryan Castro & Blessd)	Won	
Premios Lo Nuestro	2026	Urban Collaboration of the Year	"Doblexxó" (with J Balvin)	Nominated	
Premios MUSA	2022	Video of the Year	"Ultra Solo (Remix)" (with Polimá Westcoast, Pailita, Paloma Mami and De La Ghetto)	Nominated	
Premios MUSA	2023	International Latin Artist of the Year	Feid	Nominated	
Premios Nuestra Tierra	2021	Best New Artist	Feid	Nominated	
Premios Nuestra Tierra	2021	Best Urban Artist	Feid	Nominated	
Premios Nuestra Tierra	2021	Best Urban Song	"Porfa" (with Justin Quiles)	Nominated	
Premios Nuestra Tierra	2022	Artist of the Year	Feid	Nominated	
Premios Nuestra Tierra	2022	Best Urban Artist	Feid	Nominated	
Premios Nuestra Tierra	2022	Audience Favorite Artist	Feid	Nominated	
Premios Nuestra Tierra	2022	Album of the Year	Inter Shibuya – La Mafia	Nominated	
Premios Nuestra Tierra	2022	Song of the Year	"Si Tú Supieras"	Nominated	
Premios Nuestra Tierra	2022	Best Urban Song	"Vacaxiones"	Nominated	
Premios Nuestra Tierra	2022	Best Urban Song	"Monastery" (with Ryan Castro)	Nominated	
Premios Nuestra Tierra	2022	Audience Favorite Song	"Chimbita"	Nominated	
Premios Nuestra Tierra	2022	Best Live Performance	Feid Gira Colombia 2021	Nominated	
Premios Nuestra Tierra	2023	Artist of the Year	Feid	Won	
Premios Nuestra Tierra	2023	Best Urban Artist	Feid	Won	
Premios Nuestra Tierra	2023	Artista Imagen	Feid	Nominated	
Premios Nuestra Tierra	2023	Album of the Year	Feliz Cumpleaños Ferxxo, Te Pirateamos el Álbum	Nominated	
Premios Nuestra Tierra	2023	Song of the Year	"Normal"	Nominated	
Premios Nuestra Tierra	2023	Song of the Year	"Feliz Cumpleaños Ferxxo"	Nominated	
Premios Nuestra Tierra	2023	Best Urban Song	"Feliz Cumpleaños Ferxxo"	Nominated	
Premios Nuestra Tierra	2023	Best Urban Song	"Normal"	Nominated	
Premios Nuestra Tierra	2023	Best Urban Song	"Mojando Asientos" (with Maluma)	Nominated	
Premios Nuestra Tierra	2023	Best Urban Collaboration	"Mojando Asientos" (with Maluma)	Nominated	
Premios Nuestra Tierra	2023	Best Urban Collaboration	"De Tanto Chimbiar" (with Totoy el Frío)	Nominated	
Premios Nuestra Tierra	2023	Best Urban Collaboration	"Barranquilla Bajo Cero" (with Beéle and Myke Towers)	Nominated	
Premios Nuestra Tierra	2023	Best Urban Collaboration	"Monastery" (with Ryan Castro)	Won	
Premios Nuestra Tierra	2023	Concert of the Year	Ferxxo Nitro Jam	Nominated	
Premios Nuestra Tierra	2024	Artist of the Year	Feid	Nominated	
Premios Nuestra Tierra	2024	Best Urban Artist	Feid	Won	
Premios Nuestra Tierra	2024	Best Urban Song	"Classy 101" (with Young Miko)	Nominated	
Premios Nuestra Tierra	2024	Best Urban Song	"El Cielo" (with Myke Towers & Sky Rompiendo)	Nominated	
Premios Nuestra Tierra	2024	Best Urban Song	"Luna" (with ATL Jacob)	Won	
Premios Nuestra Tierra	2024	Best Urban Collaboration	"Classy 101" (with Young Miko)	Nominated	
Premios Nuestra Tierra	2024	Best Urban Collaboration	"Perro Negro" (with Bad Bunny)	Nominated	
Premios Nuestra Tierra	2024	Best Urban Collaboration	"Yandel 150" (with Yandel)	Nominated	
Premios Nuestra Tierra	2024	Best Music Video	"Vente Conmigo"	Nominated	
Premios Tu Música Urbano	2022	Top Rising Star — Male	Feid	Won	
Premios Tu Música Urbano	2022	Album of the Year – New Artist	Inter Shibuya – La Mafia	Won	
Premios Tu Música Urbano	2023	Top Artist – Male	Himself	Won	
Premios Tu Música Urbano	2023	Top Music Producer	Himself	Nominated	
Premios Tu Música Urbano	2023	Top Social Artist	Himself	Nominated	
Premios Tu Música Urbano	2023	Song of the Year	"Feliz Cumpleaños Ferxxo"	Nominated	
Premios Tu Música Urbano	2023	Collaboration of the Year	"Yandel 150" (with Yandel)	Won	
Premios Tu Música Urbano	2023	Collaboration of the Year	"La Inocente" (with Mora)	Nominated	
Premios Tu Música Urbano	2023	Collaboration of the Year	"Hey Mor" (with Ozuna)	Nominated	
Premios Tu Música Urbano	2023	Collaboration of the Year	"En la de Ella" (with Jhayco and Sech)	Nominated	
Premios Tu Música Urbano	2023	Remix of the Year	"Ultra Solo (Remix)" (with Polimá Westcoast, Pailita, Paloma Mami and De La Ghetto)	Nominated	
Premios Tu Música Urbano	2023	Video of the Year	"Chorrito Pa Las Animas"	Nominated	
Premios Tu Música Urbano	2023	Album of the Year – Male Artist	Feliz Cumpleaños Ferxxo Te Pirateamos El Álbum	Won	
Rolling Stone en Español Awards	2023	Artist of the Year	Feid	Nominated	
Rolling Stone en Español Awards	2023	Song of the Year	"Hey Mor" (with Ozuna)	Nominated	
