= ATL Jacob =

American record producer (born 1998)

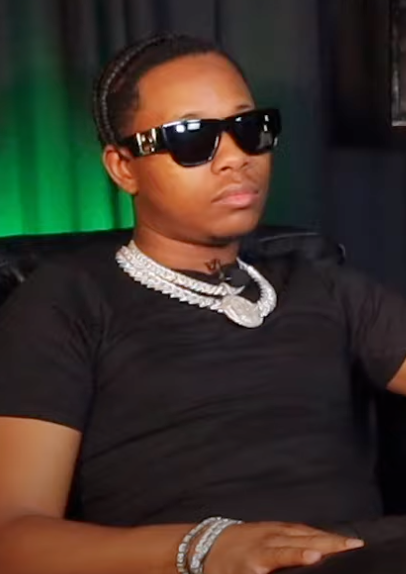
- ATL Jacob in 2022

Background information
- Born: Jacob Denzal Canady; December 10, 1998 (age 27); Atlanta, Georgia, U.S
- Genre: Trap
- Occupations: Record producer; rapper; songwriter
- Years active: 2018–present
- Labels: Wicked Money Family; Republic
- Formerly of: Freebandz

Jacob Denzal Canady (born December 10, 1998), known professionally as ATL Jacob, is an American record producer. He gained recognition in 2022 following his string of successful productions for fellow Atlanta natives Tiny Harris and Future, having previously served as an in-house producer for his record label, Freebandz. His production style has been described as "dark" and "mellow".

Born and raised in Atlanta, Georgia, Canady began his music career at age 14. At the 65th Annual Grammy Awards, he earned a nomination for Best Rap Song for his work on Future's "Wait for U". The song topped the US Billboard Hot 100 chart, while his other production, "Super Gremlin", by Florida rapper Kodak Black, peaked at number three on the chart that same year. The following year, he produced the single "Last Time I Saw You" for Nicki Minaj and released his debut single as a recording artist, "MF Problem". His 2024 single, "Luna" (with Feid), saw notable commercial success on international charts.

He was nominated as Producer of the Year for the 2022 BET Hip Hop Awards and won Producer of the Year for the XXL Awards 2023.

== Early life ==
Jacob Denzal Canady was born on December 10, 1998, (Note: In January 2023, XXL wrote that ATL Jacob was 23 years old which would place his year of birth at 1999, however in an October 2022 interview with AllHipHop, the record producer mentioned being 23 and turning 24 that year which places his actual year of birth at 1998.) in Atlanta, Georgia. Canady initially gained interest in record production as a teenager after wanting to rap on his own instrumentals.

== Career ==
In 2017, he recalls working as an audio engineer in a studio and being frustrated by artists' attitudes toward engineers. In October 2022, he was nominated as Producer of the Year for the 2022 BET Hip Hop Awards, and in January 2023, he won Producer of the Year for the XXL Awards 2023.

== Discography ==
=== Studio albums ===
- Thank You Mr C (2019)

=== Charted singles ===
List of charted singles with selected chart positions and certifications, showing year released and album name
Title	Year	Peak chart positions										Certifications	Album
Title	Year	COL	ARG	CHI	ECU	MEX	PER	SPA	US Bub.	US Latin	WW	Certifications	Album
"Luna" (with Feid)	2024	1	5	3	1	16	1	1	2	15	12	PROMUSICAE: 2× Platinum; RIAA: 4× Platinum (Latin)	Ferxxocalipsis
"—" denotes a recording that did not chart or was not released in that territory.

== Awards and nominations ==
Year	Award	Nominated work	Category	Result	Ref.
2022	BET Hip Hop Awards	Himself	Producer of the Year	Nominated	
2023	XXL Awards 2023	Himself	Producer of the Year	Won	
2023	Grammy Awards	"Wait for U" (Future, as producer)	Best Rap Song	Nominated	
2023	Grammy Awards	"Wait for U" (Future, as producer)	Best Melodic Rap Performance	Won	
