= Feid discography =

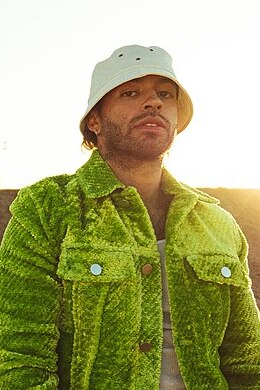
- Feid in 2022
- Studio albums: 6
- EPs: 5
- Singles: 41
- Mixtapes: 1

Colombian singer Feid has released six studio albums, two collaborative EPs, one mixtape, three extended plays, and forty-one singles.

== Albums ==
=== Studio albums ===
List of studio albums, with selected details and chart positions
Title	Details	Peak chart positions				Certifications
Title	Details	SPA	SWI	US	US Latin	Certifications
Así Como Suena	Released: 2017; Label: Universal Music Latino; Format: CD, digital download	—	—	—	—	
19	Released: 17 May 2019; Label: Universal Music Latino; Format: CD, digital download, streaming	—	—	—	—	
Ferxxo (Vol 1: M.O.R)	Released: 23 April 2020; Label: Universal Music Latino; Format: CD, digital download, streaming	18	—	—	27	AMPROFON: 2× Platinum
Inter Shibuya – La Mafia	Released: 20 August 2021; Label: Universal Music Latino; Format: CD, digital download, streaming	18	—	—	29	PROMUSICAE: Gold; RIAA: Platinum (Latin)
Feliz Cumpleaños Ferxxo Te Pirateamos el Álbum	Released: 14 September 2022; Label: Universal Music Latino; Format: CD, digital download, streaming	2	—	188	6	AMPROFON: Platinum+Gold; CAPIF: Gold; CFC: Platinum; PROMUSICAE: 2× Platinum; RIAA: Platinum (Latin)
Mor, No Le Temas a la Oscuridad	Released: 28 September 2023; Label: Universal Music Latino; Format: Digital download, streaming	2	64	31	4	PROMUSICAE: Platinum; RIAA: Platinum (Latin)
"—" denotes a recording that did not chart or was not released in that territory.

=== Mixtapes ===
List of mixtapes, with selected details and chart positions
Title	Details	Peak chart positions	
Title	Details	SPA	US Latin
Bahía Ducati	Released: 11 September 2020; Label: Universal Music Latino; Format: digital download, streaming	37	30

=== Extended plays ===
List of EPs, with selected details and chart positions
Title	Details	Peak chart positions				Certifications
Title	Details	SPA	SWI	US	US Latin	Certifications
Así Como Suena	Released: 7 October 2015; Label: Infinity Music; Format: Digital download, streaming	—	—	—	—	
The Academy (Rich Music, Sech and Dalex featuring Justin Quiles, Lenny Tavárez and Feid)	Released: 11 October 2019; Label: Rich Music; Format: Digital download, streaming	20	—	—	11	RIAA: Platinum (Latin)
Sixdo	Released: 1 December 2022; Label: Universal Music Latino; Format: Digital download, streaming	17	—	—	32	
Ferxxocalipsis	Released: 1 December 2023; Label: Universal Music Latino; Format: Digital download, streaming	2	95	123	9	PROMUSICAE: Gold; RIAA: Platinum (Latin)
Manifesting 20-05 (with Yandel)	Released: 11 April 2024; Label: In-Tu Línea, La Leyenda LLC, Universal Music Latino; Format: Digital download, streaming	21	—	—	26	
"—" denotes a recording that did not chart or was not released in that territory.

== Singles ==
=== As lead artist ===
List of singles as lead artist, with selected chart positions and certifications, showing year released and album name
Title	Year	Peak chart positions										Certifications	Album
Title	Year	COL	ARG	CHI	ECU	MEX	PER	SPA	US	US Latin	WW	Certifications	Album
"No Es Casualidad"	2014	—	—	—	—	—	—	—	—	—	—		Non-album single
"Qué Raro" (with J Balvin)	2016	—	—	—	—	—	—	78	—	47	—	RIAA: Gold (Latin)	Así Como Suena
"911" (featuring Nacho)	2017	28	—	—	—	—	—	—	—	—	—		Así Como Suena
"Sígueme" (solo or remix with Sech)	2018	72	—	—	—	—	—	—	—	—	—	PROMUSICAE: Gold; RIAA: Platinum (Latin)	19
"Fresh Kerias" (with Maluma and Sky Rompiendo)	2019	18	—	—	—	—	—	—	—	—	—		Ferxxo (Vol 1: M.O.R)
"Porfa" (with Justin Quiles)	2019	13	2	—	—	—	—	5	—	—	—	PROMUSICAE: 4× Platinum; RIAA: 4× Platinum (Latin)	Ferxxo (Vol 1: M.O.R)
"Borraxxa" (with Manuel Turizo)	2020	13	—	—	—	—	—	—	—	—	—	AMPROFON: Platinum; PROMUSICAE: Gold	Ferxxo (Vol 1: M.O.R)
"Porfa" (remix) (with J Balvin, Maluma, Nicky Jam, Sech and Justin Quiles)	2020	6	—	—	—	—	—	—	—	11	79	AMPROFON: 4× Diamond	Bahía Ducati
"Chimbita" (with Sky Rompiendo)	2020	12	—	—	—	—	—	—	—	—	—	AMPROFON: Gold; PROMUSICAE: Gold; RIAA: Platinum (Latin)	Inter Shibuya – La Mafia
"Purrito Apa" (with Icon)	2021	39	—	—	—	—	—	—	—	—	—	RIAA: Gold (Latin)	Inter Shibuya – La Mafia
"Fumeteo"	2021	39	—	—	—	—	—	—	—	—	—	PROMUSICAE: Gold; RIAA: Platinum (Latin)	Inter Shibuya – La Mafia
"Tengo Fe"	2021	26	—	—	—	—	—	—	—	—	—	RIAA: Gold (Latin)	Inter Shibuya – La Mafia
"Si Tú Supieras"	2021	11	—	—	—	—	—	—	—	—	—	PROMUSICAE: Platinum; RIAA: Platinum (Latin)	Inter Shibuya – La Mafia
"Vacaxiones"	2021	12	—	—	—	—	92	—	—	—	—	PROMUSICAE: Gold; RIAA: Platinum (Latin)	Inter Shibuya: Ferxxo Edition
"Friki" (with Karol G)	2021	13	—	—	—	—	—	—	—	34	—	AMPROFON: Platinum; PROMUSICAE: Platinum; RIAA: 3× Platinum (Latin)	Inter Shibuya: Ferxxo Edition
"Pantysito" (with Alejo and Robi)	2022	1	—	21	6	—	16	1	—	—	122	AMPROFON: Platinum+Gold; PROMUSICAE: 3× Platinum	Non-album single
"Nieve"	2022	16	—	—	—	—	—	—	—	—	—	PROMUSICAE: Gold	Feliz Cumpleaños Ferxxo Te Pirateamos el Álbum
"Castigo"	2022	13	33	—	—	—	—	86	—	20	—	PROMUSICAE: Gold; RIAA: Gold (Latin)	Feliz Cumpleaños Ferxxo Te Pirateamos el Álbum
"Ferxxo 100"	2022	3	—	—	9	—	—	64	—	—	—	PROMUSICAE: 2× Platinum; RIAA: Gold (Latin)	Feliz Cumpleaños Ferxxo Te Pirateamos el Álbum
"Normal"	2022	1	34	17	7	—	9	17	—	21	75	CAPIF: Gold; PROMUSICAE: 4× Platinum; RIAA: Platinum (Latin)	Feliz Cumpleaños Ferxxo Te Pirateamos el Álbum
"Si Te La Encuentras Por Ahí"	2022	3	—	—	16	—	—	12	—	—	129	PROMUSICAE: 2× Platinum	Feliz Cumpleaños Ferxxo Te Pirateamos el Álbum
"Feliz Cumpleaños Ferxxo"	2022	1	33	6	1	24	1	9	—	20	61	CAPIF: Gold; PROMUSICAE: 4× Platinum	Feliz Cumpleaños Ferxxo Te Pirateamos el Álbum
"De Tanto Chimbiar" (with Totoy el Frío)	2022	12	—	—	—	—	—	83	—	—	—		Non-album single
"Prohibidox"	2022	2	—	—	14	—	—	23	—	—	172	PROMUSICAE: Platinum	Feliz Cumpleaños Ferxxo
"Chorrito pa las Animas"	2022	2	41	16	3	—	4	21	—	28	82	PROMUSICAE: 3× Platinum	Sixdo
"Remix Exclusivo"	2023	4	74	15	9	—	20	13	—	38	102	AMPROFON: Gold; PROMUSICAE: Platinum; RIAA: Platinum (Latin)	Non-album single
"Classy 101" (with Young Miko)	2023	2	9	2	3	16	2	6	99	15	17	AMPROFON: Platinum; PROMUSICAE: 5× Platinum; RIAA: 19× Platinum (Latin)	Ferxxocalipsis
"Niña Bonita" (with Sean Paul)	2023	6	47	18	10	—	11	17	—	41	136	PROMUSICAE: 2× Platinum; RIAA: 4× Platinum (Latin)	Mor, No Le Temas a la Oscuridad
"Vente Conmigo"	2023	11	—	—	—	—	—	28	—	—	—	PROMUSICAE: Gold	Mor, No Le Temas a la Oscuridad
"Ferxxo 151" (with Icon)	2023	9	—	—	—	—	—	19	—	—	—	PROMUSICAE: Platinum; RIAA: Platinum (Latin)	Mor, No Le Temas a la Oscuridad
"Bubalu" (with Rema)	2023	7	61	—	21	—	14	23	—	25	—	PROMUSICAE: Platinum; RIAA: 2× Platinum (Latin)	Mor, No Le Temas a la Oscuridad
"Luces de Tecno"	2023	9	—	—	—	—	—	8	—	40	199	PROMUSICAE: Platinum; RIAA: Platinum (Latin)	Mor, No Le Temas a la Oscuridad
"Luna" (with ATL Jacob)	2024	1	5	3	1	16	1	1	— (Note: "Luna" did not enter the Billboard Hot 100, but peaked at number 2 on the Bubbling Under Hot 100 chart.)	15	12	PROMUSICAE: 2× Platinum; RIAA: 4× Platinum (Latin)	Ferxxocalipsis
"Offline" (with Young Miko)	2024	2	27	—	4	—	5	18	—	28	123	PROMUSICAE: Gold	Att.
"Sorry 4 That Much"	2024	1	36	23	2	—	6	9	— (Note: "Sorry 4 That Much" did not enter the Billboard Hot 100, but peaked at number 1 on the Bubbling Under Hot 100 chart.)	4	56		Non-album single
"Doblexxó" (with J Balvin)	2024	—	—	—	—	—	—	29	—	—	—		Rayo
"Háblame Claro" (with Yandel)	2024	15	57	—	—	—	—	9	—	31	—		Elyte
"Estoy Putiao" (with Sky Rompiendo and Dei V)	2024	—	—	—	—	—	—	42	—	—	—		Non-album single
"Cruz" (with Trueno)	2025	—	35	—	—	—	—	42	—	—	—		EUB Deluxe
"Dallax" (with Ty Dolla Sign)	2025	—	—	—	—	—	—	—	—	41	—		Ferxxo Vol X: Sagrado
"X Ti" (with Kapo)	2025	—	—	—	—	—	—	29	—	38	—		Non-album singles
"Se Lo Juro Mor"	2025	—	—	—	—	—	—	32	—	15	—		Non-album singles
"Paradixe" (with El Americano 4KT and Pirlo)	2026	—	—	—	—	—	—	—	—	—	110		El Green Print: La Saga (Disc 2) – El Club de Las 19 Flores
"—" denotes a recording that did not chart or was not released in that territory.

=== As a featured artist ===
List of singles as featured artist, with selected chart positions and certifications, showing year released and album name
Title	Year	Peak chart positions										Certifications	Album
Title	Year	COL	ARG	PER	ECU	MEX	PER	SPA	US	US Latin	WW	Certifications	Album
"Loco por Ti (MYA with Feid and Abraham Mateo)	2018	—	77	—	—	—	—	—	—	—	—		Hoy
"Pa Mí" (remix) (Dalex, Rafa Pabón and Khea featuring Feid, Sech, Cazzu and Lenny Tavárez)	2019	—	—	—	—	—	—	—	—	—	—	RIAA: 19× Platinum (Latin)	Climaxxx
"Cuaderno" (Dalex, Nicky Jam and Justin Quiles featuring Sech, Lenny Tavárez, Feid and Rafa Pabón)	2019	—	13	—	—	—	—	15	—	47	—	PROMUSICAE: Platinum; RIAA: Diamond (Latin)	Climaxxx
"Quizás" (Rich Music, Sech and Dalex featuring Justin Quiles, Wisin, Zion, Lenny Tavárez and Feid)	2019	—	31	—	—	—	—	15	—	41	—	RIAA: 7× Platinum (Latin)	The Academy
"No Fue" (Leebrian, Cauty and Rauw Alejandro featuring Brray and Feid)	2020	—	—	—	—	—	—	—	—	—	—	PROMUSICAE: Gold	Non-album single
"Querida" (with Piso 21)	2020	30	—	—	—	—	—	—	—	—	—		El Amor En Los Tiempos Del Perreo
"Monastery" (with Ryan Castro)	2021	1	—	—	4	—	—	—	—	—	—	AMPROFON: Platinum; PROMUSICAE: Platinum	Inter Shibuya: Ferxxo Edition
"Mojando Asientos" (with Maluma)	2022	9	95	—	—	—	—	—	—	—	—	PROMUSICAE: Platinum	The Love & Sex Tape
"La Inocente" (with Mora)	2022	10	—	—	9	—	19	9	—	—	169	AMPROFON: 2× Platinum; PROMUSICAE: 6× Platinum	Microdosis
"Hey Mor" (Ozuna featuring Feid)	2022	1	14	1	2	14	3	3	85	10	27	PROMUSICAE: 6× Platinum	OzuTochi
"En la de Ella" (with Jhay Cortez and Sech)	2022	16	—	—	—	—	—	20	—	26	—	PROMUSICAE: Platinum	Non-album single
"Salir con Vida" (with Morat)	2022	7	—	—	20	—	23	39	—	—	—	PROMUSICAE: Platinum; RIAA: Platinum (Latin)	Si Ayer Fuera Hoy
"A Veces" (with Paulo Londra)	2022	9	50	—	19	—	—	13	—	—	—	PROMUSICAE: Gold	Back to the Game
"Hombres y Mujeres" (with Gordo)	2022	—	76	—	—	—	—	—	—	—	—	PROMUSICAE: Gold	Non-album single
"Yandel 150" (with Yandel)	2022	1	6	1	1	21	1	2	71	6	13	PROMUSICAE: 7× Platinum; RIAA: 3× Platinum (Latin)	Resistencia
"69" (with Nicky Jam)	2023	14	90	—	25	—	—	24	—	41	—	PROMUSICAE: Platinum	Non-album singles
"El Cielo" (with Sky Rompiendo and Myke Towers)	2023	2	40	11	6	—	10	3	—	30	47	AMPROFON: Platinum; PROMUSICAE: 4× Platinum	Non-album singles
"Polaris" (Remix) (with Saiko, Quevedo and Mora)	2023	—	—	—	—	—	—	1	—	—	122	PROMUSICAE: 5× Platinum	Non-album singles
"Yankee 150" (with Yandel and Daddy Yankee)	2023	16	57	17	21	24	25	45	—	33	177	PROMUSICAE: Gold	Non-album singles
"La Baby" (with Tainy and Daddy Yankee featuring Sech)	2023	—	—	—	—	—	—	36	—	47	—		Non-album singles
"Perro Negro" (with Bad Bunny)	2023	1	24	3	1	4	1	2	20	2	4	PROMUSICAE: 4× Platinum	Nadie Sabe Lo Que Va a Pasar Mañana
"Si Sabe Ferxxo" (with Blessd)	2024	2	—	—	23	—	—	21	—	40	—		Non-album singles
"Empelotica" (with Lenny Tavárez)	2024	13	—	—	—	—	—	18	—	—	—		Non-album singles
"Se Me Olvida" (Malsak featuring Feid)	2024	—	45	—	—	—	—	11	—	—	52		Non-album singles
"—" denotes a recording that did not chart or was not released in that territory.

== Other charted songs ==
List of other charted songs, with selected chart positions and certifications, showing year released and album name
Title	Year	Peak chart positions				Certifications	Album
Title	Year	COL	ARG	CHI	SPA	Certifications	Album
"Perreo en la Luna" (Rich Music, Sech and Dalex featuring Justin Quiles, Lenny Tavárez and Feid)	2019	—	16	—	27	RIAA: 2× Platinum (Latin)	The Academy
"Porno" (Rich Music, Sech and Dalex featuring Justin Quiles, Lenny Tavárez and Feid)	2019	—	97	—	—		The Academy
"Uniforme" (Rich Music, Sech and Dalex featuring Justin Quiles, Lenny Tavárez, Feid, De La Ghetto and Zion & Lennox)	2019	—	67	—	91		The Academy
"Feel Me" (Rich Music, Sech and Dalex featuring Justin Quiles, Lenny Tavárez, Feid and Mariah Angeliq)	2019	—	10	—	—		The Academy
"Relxjxte" (with Sky Rompiendo)	2020	77	—	—	—		Ferxxo (Vol 1: M.O.R)
"Ferxxo X Ñejo" (with Ñejo)	2020	44	—	—	—		Bahía Ducati
"Jamaica" (with Sech)	2020	64	—	—	—		Bahía Ducati
"Amor de Mi Vida"	2021	17	—	—	—	PROMUSICAE: Gold; RIAA: Gold (Latin)	Inter Shibuya: Ferxxo Edition
"XQ Te Pones Asi" (with Yandel)	2022	20	—	—	53	PROMUSICAE: Gold	Feliz Cumpleaños Ferxxo
"Lady Mi Amor"	2022	15	—	—	89		Feliz Cumpleaños Ferxxo
"Belixe"	2022	22	—	—	93		Feliz Cumpleaños Ferxxo
"Quemando Calorias" (with Sky)	2022	19	—	—	—		Feliz Cumpleaños Ferxxo
"Aguante"	2022	22	—	—	—		Feliz Cumpleaños Ferxxo
"X20X"	2022	24	—	—	—		Feliz Cumpleaños Ferxxo
"La Pasamos Cxbrxn" (with Zion & Lennox)	2022	19	—	—	57	PROMUSICAE: Gold	Sixdo
"Le Pido a Dios" (with DJ Premier)	2022	9	—	—	—	PROMUSICAE: Gold	Sixdo
"Mxfix G5"	2023	—	—	—	96		Non-album song
"Gangsters y Pistolas" (with Ñengo Flow)	2023	18	—	—	45		Mor, No Le Temas a la Oscuridad
"Románticos de Lunes"	2023	16	—	—	55		Mor, No Le Temas a la Oscuridad
"Ritmo de Medallo" (with Ryan Castro)	2023	12	—	—	61		Mor, No Le Temas a la Oscuridad
"Privilegios" (with Cupido)	2023	—	—	—	63		Mor, No Le Temas a la Oscuridad
"Ferxxo Edition"	2023	14	—	—	67		Mor, No Le Temas a la Oscuridad
"El Único Tema del Ferxxo" (with Young Cister and Pailita)	2023	—	—	21	70		Mor, No Le Temas a la Oscuridad
"Ey Chory"	2023	19	—	—	74		Mor, No Le Temas a la Oscuridad
"Velocidad Crucero"	2023	—	—	—	95		Mor, No Le Temas a la Oscuridad
"Nx Tx Sientas Solx"	2023	—	—	—	99		Mor, No Le Temas a la Oscuridad
"Ferxxo 30"	2023	7	—	—	45	PROMUSICAE: Gold	Mor, No Le Temas a la Oscuridad
"Alakran"	2023	8	—	—	43		Ferxxocalipsis
"50 Palos"	2023	15	—	—	62		Ferxxocalipsis
"La Vuelta" (with Manos Ru-Fino)	2023	9	—	—	78		Ferxxocalipsis
"Cual es Esa" (with Pirlo)	2023	2	—	—	69		Ferxxocalipsis
"Esquirla"	2023	23	—	—	95		Ferxxocalipsis
"Desquite"	2023	17	—	—	53		Ferxxocalipsis
"Yo AK"	2023	20	—	—	—		Ferxxocalipsis
"Brickell" (with Yandel)	2024	—	—	—	83		Manifesting 20-05
"—" denotes a recording that did not chart or was not released in that territory.
