= List of Billboard Latin Rhythm Airplay number ones of 2023 =

The Billboard Latin Rhythm Airplay is a chart that ranks the best-performing Spanish-language Latin rhythm singles in the United States. Published by Billboard magazine, the data is compiled by Nielsen SoundScan based collectively on each single's weekly airplay.

== Chart history ==
Key
†	Indicates number 1 on Billboard's year-end Latin rhythm chart

Issue date	Song	Artist	Ref.
January 7	"Gatúbela"	Karol G and Maldy	
January 14	"Me Porto Bonito"	Bad Bunny and Chencho Corleone	
January 21	"Normal"	Feid	
January 28	"Punto 40"	Rauw Alejandro and Baby Rasta	
February 4	"Party"	Bad Bunny and Rauw Alejandro	
February 11	"Party"	Bad Bunny and Rauw Alejandro	
February 18	"Hey Mor"	Ozuna	
February 25	"Hey Mor"	Ozuna	
March 4	"Hey Mor"	Ozuna	
March 11	"Besos Moja2"	Wisin & Yandel and Rosalía	
March 18	"Besos Moja2"	Wisin & Yandel and Rosalía	
March 25	"Besos Moja2"	Wisin & Yandel and Rosalía	
April 1	"Besos Moja2"	Wisin & Yandel and Rosalía	
April 8	"Ulalá"	Myke Towers and Daddy Yankee	
April 15	"Yandel 150"	Yandel and Feid	
April 22	"Yandel 150"	Yandel and Feid	
April 29	"Yandel 150"	Yandel and Feid	
May 6	"Yandel 150"	Yandel and Feid	
May 13	"TQG" †	Karol G and Shakira	
May 20	"TQG" †	Karol G and Shakira	
May 27	"Yandel 150"	Yandel and Feid	
June 3	"TQG" †	Karol G and Shakira	
June 10	"TQG" †	Karol G and Shakira	
June 17	"TQG" †	Karol G and Shakira	
June 24	"La Bebé"	Yng Lvcas and Peso Pluma	
July 1	"La Bebé"	Yng Lvcas and Peso Pluma	
July 8	"La Bebé"	Yng Lvcas and Peso Pluma	
July 15	"La Bebé"	Yng Lvcas and Peso Pluma	
July 22	"TQG" †	Karol G and Shakira	
July 29	"TQG" †	Karol G and Shakira	
August 5	"Where She Goes"	Bad Bunny	
August 12	"Where She Goes"	Bad Bunny	
August 19	"Niña Bonita"	Feid and Sean Paul	
August 26	"Niña Bonita"	Feid and Sean Paul	
September 2	"Lala"	Myke Towers	
September 9	"Tucu"	Ozuna and Amarion	
September 16	"Podemos Repetirlo"	Don Omar and Chencho Corleone	
September 23	"Lala"	Myke Towers	
September 30	"Un Cigarrillo"	Chencho Corleone	
October 7	"Coco Loco"	Maluma	
October 14	"Coco Loco"	Maluma	
October 21	""Umaye"	Venesti	
October 28	"Copa Vacía"	Shakira and Manuel Turizo	
November 4	"Dientes"	J Balvin, Usher, and DJ Khaled	
November 11	"Un Preview"	Bad Bunny	
November 18	"Un Preview"	Bad Bunny	
November 25	"Lala"	Myke Towers	
December 2	"Un Preview"	Bad Bunny	
December 9	"Pasa_je_ro"	Farruko	
December 16	"Lala"	Myke Towers	
December 23	"Bubalu"	Feid and Rema	
December 30	"Bubalu"	Feid and Rema	
