= Neve =

Neve may refer to:

== Companies ==
- AMS Neve, a British audio design & engineering company
- Neve Electronics, one of the companies that formed AMS Neve
  - Neve 80 Series, hand-wired analogue mixing consoles manufactured by Neve Electronics

== People ==
=== Given name ===
- Neve or Nieve, variant forms of the given name Niamh
- Neve Campbell, Canadian actress
- Neve, stage name of Italian muralist Danilo Pistone (born 1986)
- Neve Gordon, Israeli law scholar

=== Surname ===
- Edwin Neve (1885–1920), English footballer
- Margaret Ann Neve (1792–1903), first recorded female supercentenarian
- Rupert Neve (1926–2021), electronics engineer and entrepreneur
- Suzanne Neve (born 1939), English actress

== Places ==
- Neve (titular see), former Roman Catholic diocese in Arabia
- Neve, now called Nawa, Syria, a city in the Roman province of Arabia Petraea
- Neve, a component of Hebrew placenames literally meaning "place of residence", "oasis"
- Neve Glacier, North Cascades National Park, Washington, U.S.
- Neve Peak, North Cascades National Park, Washington, U.S.
- Neve Tzedek, neighborhood in Tel Aviv, Israel

== Other uses ==
- Névé, a type of snow associated with glacier formation
- Neve (American band), American pop rock group, 1997–2001
- Neve (British band), released a vocal version of Y-Traxx's Mystery Land

== See also ==
- Nev (disambiguation)
- Neev (disambiguation)
- Neves (disambiguation)
- Neves (surname), a surname
- Nevus (plural "nevi"), a medical term encompassing moles, birthmarks, beauty marks, and other types of lesion
- Nieve (disambiguation)
