= Nieve =

Nieve may refer to:

== Given name ==
- Nieve (given name), Irish given name
  - Nieve Ella (born 2003), English singer
  - Nieve Jennings (born 1987), Scottish model and beauty pagean
- Nieve Berónica Vibieca Aquino, Dominican Republic badminton player
- Nieve de Medina (born 1962) is a Spanish actress and stage director

== Surname ==
- Fernando Nieve
- Kelvin de la Nieve
- Mikel Nieve
- Oliba Nieve
- Steve Nieve (born 1958), English musician and composer

== Other ==
- Nieve Airport, airport in Nieve, Bolivia
- "Nieve" (song) by the Colombian singer Feid

== See also ==
- Nievas
- Nieva (disambiguation)
- Neve (disambiguation)
- Neves (disambiguation)
