= Pyramid Peak (Whatcom County, Washington) =

Mountain in Washington (state), United States

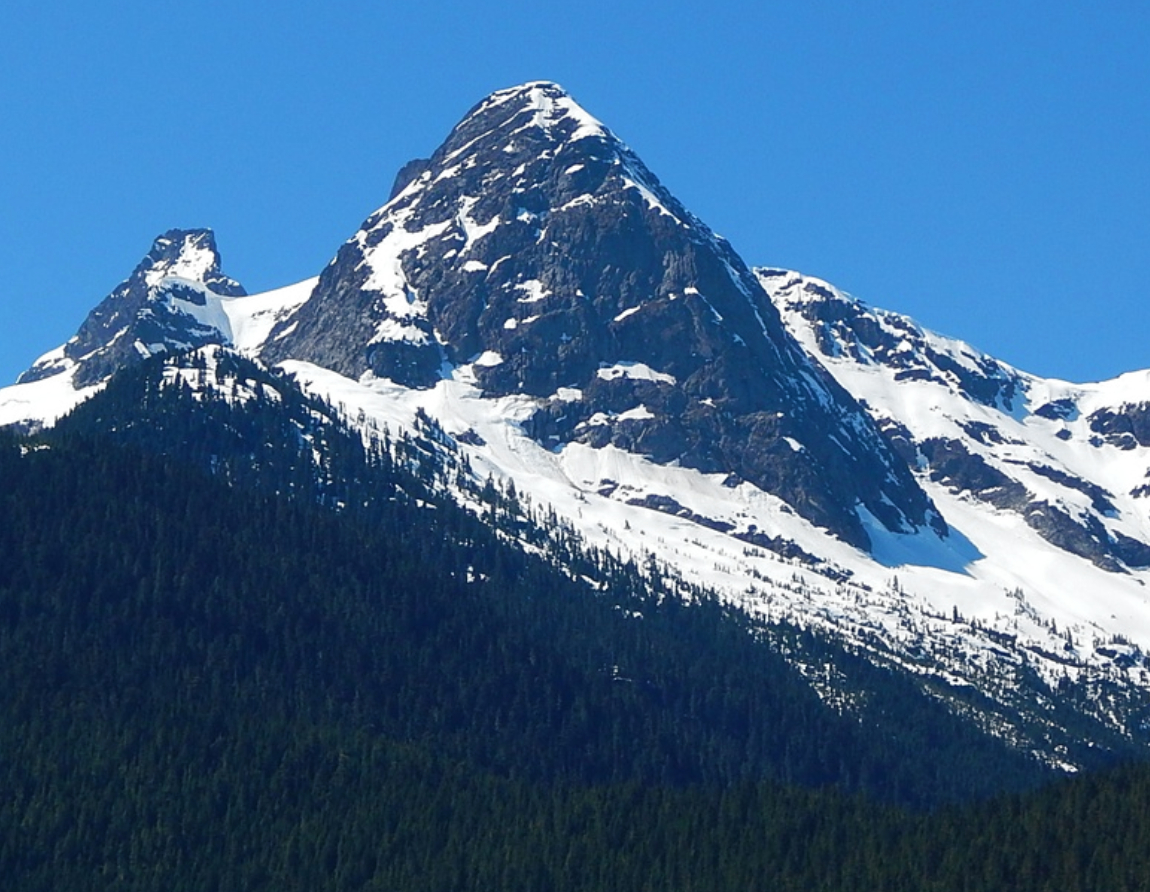
- Pyramid Peak seen from Diablo Lake Overlook

Highest point
- Elevation: 7,189 ft (2,191 m)
- Prominence: 142 ft (43 m)
- Parent peak: Pinnacle Peak (7,386 ft)
- Isolation: 0.28 mi (0.45 km)
- Coordinates: 48°40′28″N 121°08′46″W

Geography
- Location within Washington (state) Location within the United States
- Interactive map of Pyramid Peak
- Country: United States
- State: Washington
- County: Whatcom
- Protected area: North Cascades National Park
- Parent range: North Cascades
- Topo map: USGS Diablo Dam

Geology
- Rock type: gneiss

Climbing
- First ascent: 1931, William Degenhardt and Herbert Strandberg
- Easiest route: Scrambling (class 3)

Pyramid Peak is a 7,189-foot (2,191-metre) mountain summit in the North Cascades Range of Washington, United States. It is located within North Cascades National Park. It rises steeply from Diablo Lake, one of the reservoirs on the Skagit River. It is part of a group of peaks that form the northern end of a chain running south through climbing destinations such as Colonial Peak, Paul Bunyans Stump, and Snowfield Peak. Like many North Cascade peaks, Pyramid Peak is more notable for its large, steep rise above local terrain than for its absolute elevation. Topographic relief is significant as the summit rises 6,400 feet (2,000 meters) above the Skagit River in 2.5 miles (4 km). Precipitation runoff from the mountain drains into Diablo Lake and Skagit River.

Pyramid Peak was first climbed in 1931 by William Degenhardt and Herbert Strandberg of the Seattle Mountaineers. The approach is made via the Pyramid Lake Trail, starting near Diablo Dam on the North Cascades Highway.

== Climate ==
Pyramid Peak is located in the marine west coast climate zone of western North America. Most weather fronts originating in the Pacific Ocean travel northeast toward the Cascade Mountains. As fronts approach the North Cascades, they are forced upward by the peaks of the Cascade Range (orographic lift), causing them to drop their moisture in the form of rain or snowfall onto the Cascades. As a result, the west side of the North Cascades experiences high precipitation, especially during the winter months in the form of snowfall. Because of maritime influence, snow tends to be wet and heavy, resulting in high avalanche danger. During winter months, weather is usually cloudy, but, due to high pressure systems over the Pacific Ocean that intensify during summer months, there is often little or no cloud cover during the summer.

== Geology ==
The North Cascades features some of the most rugged topography in the Cascade Range with craggy peaks, spires, ridges, and deep glacial valleys. Geological events occurring many years ago created the diverse topography and drastic elevation changes over the Cascade Range leading to the various climate differences.

The history of the formation of the Cascade Mountains dates back millions of years ago to the late Eocene Epoch. With the North American Plate overriding the Pacific Plate, episodes of volcanic igneous activity persisted. In addition, small fragments of the oceanic and continental lithosphere called terranes created the North Cascades about 50 million years ago.

During the Pleistocene period dating back over two million years ago, glaciation advancing and retreating repeatedly scoured the landscape leaving deposits of rock debris. The U-shaped cross section of the river valleys is a result of recent glaciation. Uplift and faulting in combination with glaciation have been the dominant processes which have created the tall peaks and deep valleys of the North Cascades area.

== Gallery ==
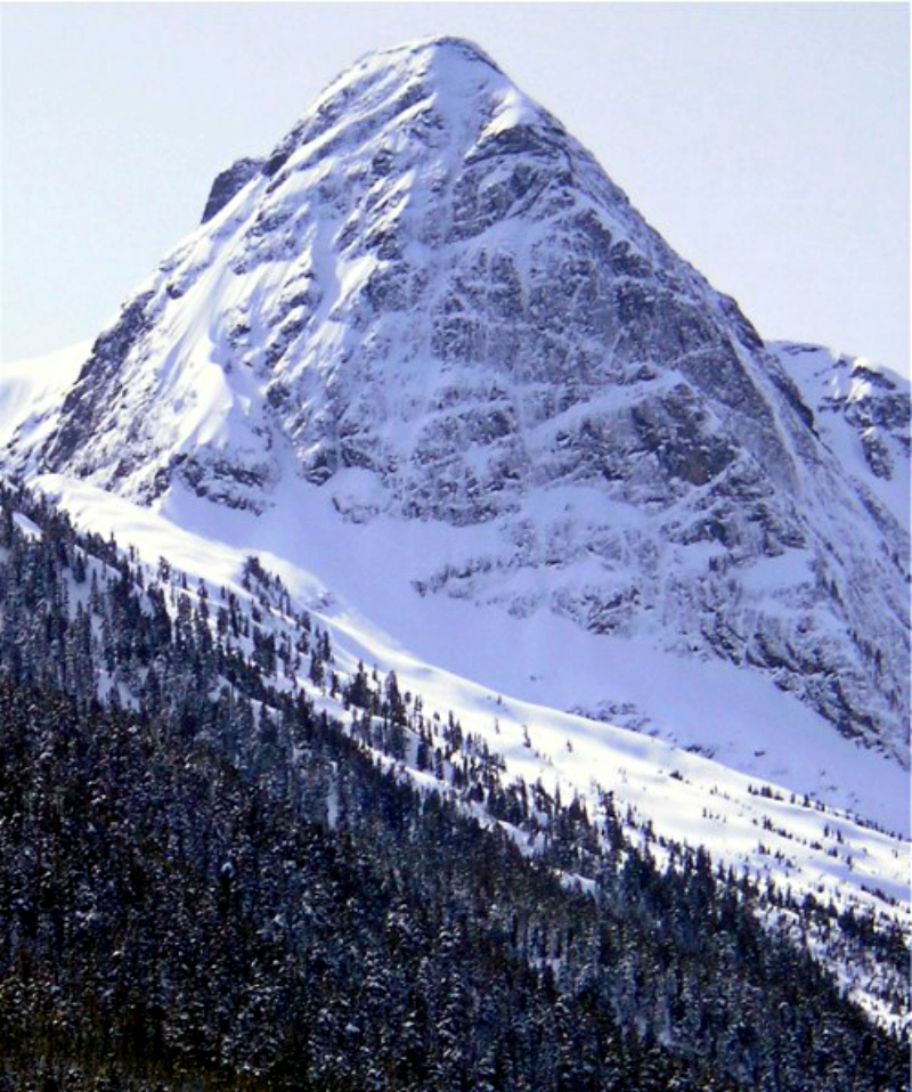
Pyramid Peak

== See also ==
- Geography of the North Cascades
- Geology of the Pacific Northwest
