= Hora de Salir =

Single by Chencho Corleone

from the album Solo
- Language: Spanish
- English title: "Time to Go"
- Released: June 29, 2023
- Recorded: 2023
- Genre: Reggaeton
- Length: 3:03
- Label: Cerco; Sony Latin
- Songwriters: Orlando Valle; Urbani Mota Cedeño; Jorge Luis Romero; Jowell Hernández
- Producers: Urba & Rome

Chencho Corleone singles chronology
"Podemos Repetirlo" (2023)	"Hora de Salir" (2023)	"Podemos Repetirlo" (remix) (2023)

Music video
- "Hora de Salir" on YouTube

"Hora de Salir" (English: "Time to Go") is a song by Puerto Rican singer Chencho Corleone. It was released on June 29, 2023, through Cerco and Sony Music Latin. It is the second single that Chencho Corleone performs alone, after "Un Cigarrillo". It is also the second single from his debut studio album, Solo (2024).

== Background and release ==
After the success of "Un Cigarrillo" just a month later, at the end of June 2023 he announced the release of his new single "Hora de Salir" for June 29.

== Music video ==
The music video was premiered on Chencho Corleone's official YouTube channel on June 29, 2023 along with the single simultaneously and shows Corleone performing the song while driving a racing car and at a nightclub. It also shows a woman getting ready to "go out".

== Certifications ==
Certifications and sales for "Desesperados"
Region	Certification	Certified units/sales
United States (RIAA)	Platinum (Latin)	60,000^{‡}
^{‡} Sales+streaming figures based on certification alone.
