= Neiva (disambiguation) =

Neiva, Huila is the capital of the department of Huila in Colombia.

Neiva and similar can also mean:

- Salvelinus neiva, a species of fish
- Laura Neiva (born 1993), Brazilian actress and model
- Neyva River, a 294 kilometer river in the Sverdlovsk Oblast of Russia
- Indústria Aeronáutica Neiva, Brazilian aerospace company

== See also ==
- Nieva (disambiguation)
