= Nev =

Nev or NEV may refer to:

- Nev, a shortened form of the given name Neville
- Nev, a common abbreviation of the U.S. State of Nevada
- nev, the ISO 639-3 language code for the Nyaheun language native to Laos

== People ==
- Nev Chandler (1946–1994), American sports broadcaster
- Nev Cottrell (1927–2014), Australian rugby union footballer
- Nev Edwards (born 1987), English rugby union player
- Nev Fountain, English writer
- Nev Hewitt (1920–2016), Queensland-based Australian politician
- Nev Schulman (born 1984), Israeli-American producer, actor and photographer
- Nev Warburton (1932–2018), Queensland-based Australian politician

== Others ==
- Nev the Bear, a small, blue puppet bear appearing in the CBBC television programmes Smile and Bear Behaving Badly

== Abbreviations ==
- National Electric Vehicle Sweden (NEV Sweden)
- Neighborhood electric vehicle, a U.S. denomination for battery electric vehicles
- New energy vehicle, in China, vehicles that are partially or fully powered by electricity
- Vance W. Amory International Airport on the island of Nevis, Saint Kitts and Nevis (IATA airport code)
- North East Valley, a suburb of Dunedin, New Zealand

== See also ==
- Neev (disambiguation)
- Neve
