= Si Te la Encuentras Por Ahí =

Single by Feid

from the album Feliz Cumpleaños Ferxxo Te Pirateamos el Álbum
- Language: Spanish
- English title: "If You Find It There"
- Released: August 5, 2022
- Genre: Reggaeton
- Length: 3:11
- Label: Universal Music Latino
- Songwriters: Alejandro Ramírez Suárez; Andrés Restrepo; Andrés Correa; Esteban Higuita; Johan Esteban Espinoza; Salomón Villada Hoyos
- Producers: Jowan; Sky Rompiendo

Feid singles chronology
"Tarde" (2022)	"Si Te la Encuentras Por Ahí" (2022)	"Feliz Cumpleaños Ferxxo" (2022)

Music video
- "Si Te La Encuentras Por Ahí" on YouTube

"Si Te la Encuentras Por Ahí" (Spanish for "If You Find It There") is a song by Colombian singer Feid. It was released on August 5, 2022, through Universal Music Latino, as the fifth single from his fifth studio album Feliz Cumpleaños Ferxxo Te Pirateamos el Álbum (2022).

== Background and release ==
After the success of "Normal", at the end of July 2022 Feid announced the release of his new single "Si Te La Encuentras Por Ahí" scheduled for August 5.

Later, Feid released his album Feliz Cumpleaños Ferxxo Te Pirateamos el Álbum, and "Si Te La Encuentras Por Ahí" was included as the thirteenth track.

== Music and lyrics ==
"Si Te La Encuentras Por Ahí"
A 23 seconds sample from the chorus of the song.

Musically, "Si Te La Encuentras Por Ahí" is a reggaeton song which starts with violin sounds. Lyrically, "Si Te La Encuentras Por Ahí" talks about a man who looks for the woman he fell in love with, despite knowing that he made a mistake, and apologizes to try to win her over again.

== Music video ==
The official music video was recorded in Madrid and was released simultaneously with the single on Feid's official YouTube channel on August 5, 2022. It shows Feid performing the song in a luxury city and walking around and at the end at a birthday party.

== Certifications ==
Certifications for "Si Te La Encuentras Por Ahí"
Region	Certification	Certified units/sales
Spain (PROMUSICAE)	3× Platinum	180,000^{‡}
Streaming
Central America (CFC)	Platinum	7,000,000^{†}
^{‡} Sales+streaming figures based on certification alone.^{†} Streaming-only figures based on certification alone.
