= Ferxxo 100 =

Single by Feid

from the album Feliz Cumpleaños Ferxxo Te Pirateamos el Álbum
- Language: Spanish
- Released: June 3, 2022
- Genre: Reggaeton
- Length: 2:47
- Label: Universal Music Latino
- Songwriters: Salomón Villada Hoyos; Alejandro Ramírez Suárez; Johan Esteban Espinosa; Andrés David Restrepo Echavarría; Esteban Higuita; Sebastién Julied Alfred
- Producers: Sky Rompiendo; Jowan

Feid singles chronology
"Barranquilla Bajo Cero" (2022)	"Ferxxo 100" (2022)	"Ultra Solo" (remix) (2022)

Music video
- "Ferxxo 100" on YouTube

"Ferxxo 100" is a song by Colombian singer Feid. It was released on June 3, 2022, through Universal Music Latino, as the third single from his fifth studio album, Feliz Cumpleaños Ferxxo Te Pirateamos el Álbum (2022).

Its significance is that it is the 100th song that Feid has written as an artist.

== Background and release ==
After the success of "Castigo", Feid announced on his social networks the release of "Ferxxo 100" scheduled for June 3, 2022.

Feid later released his album Feliz Cumpleaños Ferxxo Te Pirateamos el Álbum, and "Ferxxo 100" was included as the fifth track.

== Music and lyrics ==
"Ferxxo 100"
A 24 seconds sample of the chorus of the song.

Musically, "Ferxxo 100" is a song that begins its first 60 seconds with sad piano sounds, and then changes to a ready-to-play reggaeton sound. Likewise, 80 seconds after starting the song, it changes to reggaeton with continuous sad piano sounds that suddenly changes to latin trap and ends with the piano sounds in sad mode. Lyrically, "Ferxxo 100" is a very emotional song, in which the artist narrates the pain he feels after losing the person he loved and wants to recover. The lyrics includes, "Pero la miro y me acuerdo de ti / No sé cómo explicarte lo que sentí / Salgo to' los días pa' la calle / A ver si te veo por ahí / Yo todo intenso preguntando por vos / Te mando música por notas de voz / Y solo espero que si no vuelves conmigo / Siempre te cuide Dios".

== Music video ==
The music video was released along with the single on June 3, 2022 on Feid's official YouTube channel. A visual in which we see the artist interpret the lyrics while remembering the moments he lived with his ex-partner.

== Covers ==
Singer-songwriter DannyLux included a cover of "Ferxxo 100" on his album DLUX, stating he admires Feid's songwriting and recorded a demo of the song "just to see how it would sound". He later re-recorded the song to include on his album, stating he hopes Feid likes his version.

== Certifications ==
Certifications for "Ferxxo 100"
Region	Certification	Certified units/sales
Spain (PROMUSICAE)	3× Platinum	180,000^{‡}
United States (RIAA)	Gold (Latin)	30,000^{‡}
Streaming
Central America (CFC)	2× Platinum	14,000,000^{†}
^{‡} Sales+streaming figures based on certification alone.^{†} Streaming-only figures based on certification alone.
