= Nea =

NEA or Nea may refer to:

== Businesses and organizations ==
- Bureau of Near Eastern Affairs, in the U.S. Department of State
- Ta Nea (The News), a newspaper in Greece
- National Economic Association, an American learned society
- National Editorial Association, previous name of the National Newspaper Association, U.S.
- National Education Association, an American educational labor union
- National Endowment for the Arts, an independent agency of the United States federal government
- National Energy Action, a British charity
- National Environment Agency, a Singapore government agency
- Nepal Electricity Authority
- Nepal Engineers Association
- New England Airlines, an American regional airline
- New Enterprise Associates, an American venture capital firm
- Newspaper Enterprise Association, an American newspaper syndication service
- Northern Examining Association, a former British examination board
- Nuclear Energy Agency, an intergovernmental agency

== Other uses ==
- Nea (given name), including a list of people and fictional characters with the name
- Linnea Södahl (born 1987), also known as Nea, Swedish singer and songwriter
- Nea (beetle), a genus of weevils in the tribe Rhynchophorini
- Nea (river), in Norway and Sweden
- 2-Pyrrolylethylamine, or NEA, a chemical compound
- National Emergencies Act, a United States federal law
- Near-Earth asteroid
- NASA Exoplanet Archive, an online astronomical exoplanet catalog
- Nea (New Comedy) in the Ancient Greek comedy
- Nea, a dialect of Nalögo
- nea-, an unofficial unit prefix for 10^{27}
