= Niamh =

- Pronunciation: English: /niːv, ˈniːəv/ NEEV, NEE-əv; Irish: [n̠ʲiəw]
- Gender: feminine
- Language: Irish

Origin
- Origin: Ireland
- Meaning: bright, radiant
- Region of origin: Ireland

Other names
- Related names: Nia
- Popularity: see popular names

Niamh (Irish: [n̠ʲiəw]; from Old Irish Niaṁ) is an Irish feminine given name (meaning "bright" or "radiant"), anglicised as Neve, Nieve, Neave, Neavh or Neeve.

In Irish mythology, Niamh is the daughter of the god of the sea, Manannán mac Lir and one of the queens of Tír na nÓg, the land of eternal youth. She was the lover of the poet-hero Oisín. The first recorded use of Niamh as a given name in modern Ireland was in 1911, when two children were registered with the name and when a Niamh was listed in that year's census.

== People with the given name ==
=== Niamh ===
- Niamh Algar (born 1992), Irish actress
- Niamh Bannister (born 2010), British synchronised swimmer
- Niamh Bhreathnach (born 1945), Irish Minister for Education, 1993–97
- Niamh Blackshaw (born 1998), English actress
- Niamh Brennan (born 1954), Irish academic
- Niamh Briggs (born 1984), captain of Ireland's women's rugby team, 2015 Six Nations Champions
- Niamh Campbell, Irish author
- Niamh Charles (born 1999), English footballer
- Niamh Cosgrave (born 1964), Irish politician
- Niamh Coyle, camogie player
- Niamh Coyne (born 2001), Irish swimmer
- Niamh Cusack (born 1959), Irish actress, daughter of Cyril Cusack
- Niamh Emerson (born 1999), English heptathlete
- Niamh Fahey (born 1987), Irish footballer
- Niamh Farrelly (born 1999), Irish footballer
- Niamh Fisher-Black (born 2000), New Zealand professional racing cyclist
- Niamh Greene (born 1971), Irish writer
- Niamh Houston (born 1991), Northern Irish musician
- Niamh Kavanagh (born 1968), Irish singer and 1993 winner of the Eurovision Song Contest
- Niamh Kelly (born 1995), Gaelic football player and Australian rules player
- Niamh Kilkenny (born 1989), Irish camogie player
- Niamh Kindlon (born 1981), Irish Gaelic footballer
- Niamh McCann (born 1971), Irish sculptor and visual artist
- Niamh McCarthy (born 1994), Irish Paralympic discus thrower
- Niamh McGrady (born 1983), Northern Irish actress
- Niamh McGrath, camogie player
- Niamh Mulcahy, camogie player
- Niamh Ní Charra, Irish fiddler, concertina player and singer
- Niamh Nic Daéid, Irish forensic scientist
- Niamh O’Connor, writer, journalist and novelist
- Niamh Parsons, traditional Irish singer
- Niamh Peacock (born 2008), English footballer
- Niamh Perry (born 1990), Irish singer and actress
- Niamh Marie Redmond, Miss Ireland 1996
- Niamh Reid Burke (born 1991), Irish footballer
- Niamh Reynolds (born 2001), Irish footballer
- Niamh Rippin (born 1994), British artistic gymnast
- Niamh Salkeld, Welsh Plaid Cymru politician
- Niamh Sharkey Irish children's author
- Niamh Smyth (born 1978), Irish politician
- Niamh Uí Bhriain (born 1970), Irish activist
- Niamh Walsh, Irish actress
- Niamh Whelan (born 1990), Irish sprinter
- Niamh Wilson (born 1997), Canadian actress

=== Neve, Neave, or Nieve ===
- Nieve Ella (born 2003), English singer
- Nieve Jennings (born 1987), Scottish model
- Neve McIntosh (born 1972), Scottish actress
- Neve Gayford (born 2018), daughter of Jacinda Ardern, former Prime Minister of New Zealand
- Neave Brown (1929–2018), American-British architect
- Neve Campbell (born 1973), Canadian actress (Neve was also the maiden name of her Dutch mother)

== Fictional ==
=== Characters ===
- Niamh, wife of Slaine Mac Roth in the 2000 AD comic series Sláine
- Niamh, in the book Son of the Shadows by Juliet Marillier
- Niamh, in the ABC2 show Please Like Me
- Niamh, in the movie Dark Touch
- Niamh, in the book The Kaiju Preservation Society by John Scalzi
- Niamh, in the Sesame Street spin-off Power of We Club
- Niamh Brodie, deceased sister of Jackson Brodie in the book Case Histories by Kate Atkinson
- Niamh Cassidy, in the soap opera Fair City
- Niamh Cranitch, in the BBC legal drama, Silk
- Niamh Connolly, in Channel 4 TV series Father Ted
- Niamh Donoghue, in the BBC 1 series Doctors
- Niamh Fairbrother, in the book The Casual Vacancy by JK Rowling
- Professor Niamh Fitzgerald, from the video game Hogwarts Legacy
- Niamh the Invitation Fairy, in the book series Rainbow Magic
- Niamh O’Connor (character), minor character in the soap opera Emmerdale
- Niamh O'Hare, in the Irish TV series Hope Street
- Niamh Power, birth name of protagonist in Orphan Train, novel by Christina Baker Kline
- Niamh Reid, in the TV3 series Red Rock
- Ebba/Niamh Rose, known as Rose, main character in the book East by Edith Pattou
- Niamh Quigley, in the BBC Television programme Ballykissangel
- Niamh Harrigan, in Ted Lasso

=== Places ===
- The Niamh Passes, a set of mountain passes located in the world of Robert Jordan's epic fantasy series The Wheel of Time

== Other uses of the name ==
- LÉ Niamh (P52), a ship in the Irish Naval Service

== See also ==
- List of Irish-language given names
- Neave (disambiguation)
- Neve (disambiguation)
- Nieve (disambiguation)
- Nia (given name)
- Nieves
