= Nieva =

Nieva may refer to:

== Places ==
- Nieva, Spain, a municipality in Spain
- Nieva District, Peru
- Nieva River, Peru

== Surname ==
- Brian Nieva, Argentine footballer
- Fabricio Nieva (born 1974), Argentine boxer
- Francisco Nieva, Spanish playwright
- Gregorio Nieva (1880-1951), Filipino publisher, journalist, businessman, and lawyer
- Juan Nieva, Colombian footballer
- Judiel Nieva, Filipino actress and businesswoman
- Martín Travieso Nieva, American politician and jurist
- Michel Nieva (born 1988), Argentine writer
- Petra de Nieva (aka Petrita Nieva), Spanish film editor
- Tony Nieva, Filipino journalist, union organizer, and activist
- Wil Cordero Nieva, Puerto Rican baseball player

== Other ==
- Nieva (band), Spanish rock/electronica band

== See also ==
- "Nieva, Nieva", a single by Paulina Rubio
- Nievas
- Nieve
- Neves
