= Nea (given name) =

- Gender: Feminine

Origin
- Origin: Finnish, Swedish
- Meaning: Twinflower (English); New (Greek); Snow (Romanian); God's sanctuary (Hebrew)

Other names
- Nicknames: Nepsu, Neppari, Neponen
- Related names: Neea, Linnea, Linnéa, Vanamo, Nia, Neya, Nya, Niah, Nyah, Niya

Nea and Neea are Finnish female given names.

The name has been in the Finnish Almanac since 1995, but the name has been considerably in use much earlier. At the end of 2015 according to the Population Register Center, approximately 7,140 women have been named Nea and 3,110 women have been named Neea.

Nea and Neea are shortened versions of Linnea which is a female given name of Swedish origin. The name Linnea is linked to the famous 18th-century Swedish scientist Carl Linnaeus, who was ennobled as Carl von Linné later in life.

August 3 is the official name day for Nea, Neea, Linnea and Vanamo.

== People named Nea ==
- Nea Marshall Kudi Ngwa, Cameroonian-American drag queen
- Nea Morin (née Barnard) (1905–1986), British rock and mountain climber
- Nea-Stina Liljedahl (born 1993), Finnish football player

== Fictional characters ==
- Nea D. Campbell, fictional character in D.Gray-man manga
- Nea Kivi, protagonist of Merja Jalo's "Nea" book series
- Nea Karlsson, survivor in the video game, Dead By Daylight

== See also ==
- Nea (disambiguation)
- Nela (name)
- Nia (given name)
