= Nia (given name) =

Nia is a given name which appears in many cultures.

In Bulgaria, it is a short form of the feminine name Evgenia.

In English it is a short form of the feminine given name Antonia used in Mexico, the United States, most of Canada, Guyana, the United Kingdom, Ireland, Australia, New Zealand, Philippines, Peninsular Malaysia, India, Pakistan, Liberia, Sierra Leone, Ghana, Namibia, South Africa, Botswana, Zimbabwe, Zambia, Malawi, Tanzania, Uganda, Kenya, Sudan, South Sudan, Ethiopia, Cameroon, and Nigeria.

In Wales it is used as a feminine given name deriving from the Old Irish name Niamh, meaning "bright".

It is also an Afro-Asiatic name of Swahili origins used in the East African nations of South Sudan, Ethiopia, Somalia, Somaliland, Kenya, Uganda, Rwanda, Burundi, Tanzania, Mozambique, Comoros and Mayotte meaning "purpose".

Nia (Georgian: ნია) is a popular name in Georgia.

== Given name ==
- Nia Abdallah (born 1984), American Taekwondoist and Olympian
- Nia Ali (born 1988), American track and field athlete
- Nia Archives (born 1999), British record producer, DJ, singer and songwriter
- Nia Faith Betty (born 2001), Canadian activist and fashion designer
- Nia Brodie (born 1995), American basketball player
- Nia Burks (born 1984), American artist
- Nia Caron, Welsh actress
- Nia DaCosta (born 1989), American filmmaker
- Nia Daniati (born 1964), Indonesian singer and actress
- Nia Dennis (born 1999), American artistic gymnast
- Nia Franklin (born 1993), American composer and beauty pageant titleholder
- Nia Greig (born 2008), Jersey cricketer
- Nia Gill (born 1948), American politician
- Nia Griffith (born 1956), Welsh politician
- Nia-Malika Henderson (born 1974), American political reporter
- Nia Imara, American astrophysicist
- Nia Jones (born 1992), Welsh netball and football player
- Nia King, American artist and activist
- Nia Künzer (born 1980), German football player
- Nia Long (born 1970), American actress
- Nia Love, American dancer and choreographer
- Nia Medi, Welsh actress and author
- Nia Misikea (born 1993), Niuean track and field athlete
- Nia Roberts (actress) (born 1972), Welsh actress
- Nia Roberts (presenter), Welsh radio and television presenter
- Nia Sanchez (born 1990), American model, television presenter, and beauty pageant titleholder
- Nia Segamain (fl. c.3rd/4th century BC), High King of Ireland
- Nia Sharma (born 1990), Indian actress and model
- Nia Sioux (born 2001), American dancer and actress
- Nia Tsivtsivadze (born 1994), Georgian model and beauty pageant titleholder
- Nia Williams (born 1990), American soccer player

== Nickname ==
- Nia Dinata, professional name of Nurkurniati Aisyah Dewi, (born 1970), Indonesian film director
- Nia Jax, ring name of Savelina Fanene, (born 1984), American professional wrestler
- Nia Peeples, nickname of Virenia Gwendolyn Peeples (born 1961), American singer and actress
- Nia Ramadhani, stage name of Prianti Nur Ramadhani, (born 16 April 1990), Indonesian entertainer
- Nia Vardalos, nickname of Antonia Eugenia Vardalos (born 1962), Canadian actress, screenwriter, and producer
- Nia Zulkarnaen, nickname of Vanya Zulkarnaen (born 1970), Indonesian singer, actress and producer

== Middle name ==
- Crimthann Nia Náir (fl. 12 BC – AD 9), High King of Ireland.
- Cairbre Nia Fer (fl. 27 BC – AD 14), King of Tara

== Surname ==
- Bethan Nia, Welsh musician
- Ahmad Soleimani Nia, Iranian actor

== Fictional characters ==
- Nia the Helpful Engine, a character from the British TV series Thomas & Friends
- Nia, a character from the My Scene doll line
- Nia, a Turkish Van raced cat from a cartoon called Canimals
- Nia, a character from the Pop'n Music video game series
- Nia, a main character in Xenoblade Chronicles 2
- Nia Honjou, a character in the Date A Live light novel series.
- Nia Moseby, The Suite Life of Zack & Cody character
- Nia Nal, also known by her code name Dreamer, DC Comics character from Supergirl TV series
- Nia Teppelin, a main protagonist in Tengen Toppa Gurren Lagann
- Nia Tudzharova, character in Bulgarian TV series, Undercover
- Nia (Charles d'Artanian), a female character in Hyakka Ryōran
- Nia Baxter-Carter, a female character in Raven's Home

== See also ==
- Niia (born 1988), American musician
- Nea (given name)
- Nie (surname)
