= Colonial Glacier =

Glacier in the state of Washington

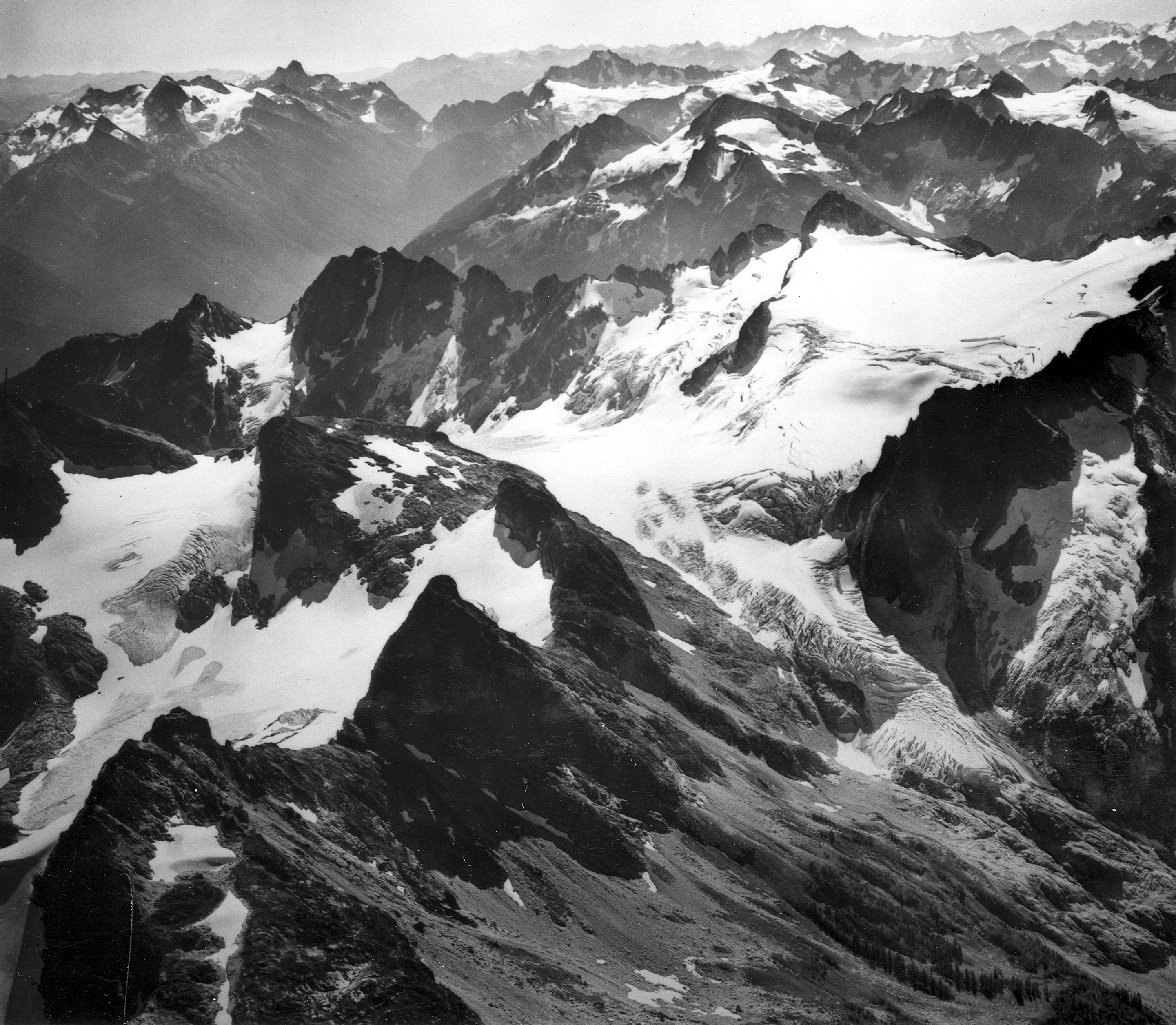
- View of Neve Glacier at right from the northeast as seen in 1971. The smaller Colonial Glacier is at left.

- Location within Washington (state)
- Type: Alpine glacier
- Location: Whatcom County, Washington, U.S.
- Coordinates: 48°39′43″N 121°08′20″W
- Length: .60 mi (0.97 km)
- Terminus: Proglacial lake
- Status: Retreating

Colonial Glacier is in North Cascades National Park in the U.S. state of Washington and is immediately northwest of Neve Peak. Colonial Glacier flows generally north, descending from 6,800 to 6,000 ft (2,100 to 1,800 m). Between 1950 and 2006, Colonial Glacier is estimated to have retreated more than 300 m (980 ft) and a newly formed proglacial lake filled the recently vacated former terminal moraine. The reduction in size of the glaciers of the North Cascades will reduce summertime meltwater runoff which is used to maintain a steady supply of electricity from hydroelectric power plants.

== See also ==
- List of glaciers in the United States
