= Feliz Cumpleaños Ferxxo =

Single by Feid

from the album Feliz Cumpleaños Ferxxo Te Pirateamos el Álbum
- Language: Spanish
- English title: "Happy Birthday Ferxxo"
- Released: August 19, 2022
- Genre: Reggaeton
- Length: 2:35
- Label: Universal Music Latino
- Songwriters: Andrés Restrepo; Esteban Higuita; Johan Esteban Espinosa; Salomón Villada Hoyos; Alejandro Ramírez Suárez
- Producers: Jowan; Sky Rompiendo

Feid singles chronology
"Si Te La Encuentras Por Ahí" (2022)	"Feliz Cumpleaños Ferxxo" (2022)	"Como Ñengo" (2022)

Music video
- "Feliz Cumpleaños Ferxxo" on YouTube

"Feliz Cumpleaños Ferxxo" (Spanish for "Happy Birthday Ferxxo") is a song by Colombian singer Feid. It was released on August 19, 2022, the same day as his birthday, through Universal Music Latino, as the sixth single from his fifth studio album Feliz Cumpleaños Ferxxo Te Pirateamos el Álbum (2022). The song pays tribute to the singer's thirtieth birthday.

== Background and release ==
One week after the release of "Si Te La Encuentras Por Ahí", Feid announced his new single "Feliz Cumpleaños Ferxxo" scheduled to be released on August 19, the same day as his birthday.

Later, Feid released his album Feliz Cumpleaños Ferxxo Te Pirateamos el Álbum, and "Feliz Cumpleaños Ferxxo" was included as the third track, it is also known as the main song of the album.

== Music and lyrics ==
"Feliz Cumpleaños Ferxxo"
A 24 seconds sample from the chorus of the song.

Musically, "Feliz Cumpleaños Ferxxo" is a reggaeton song. Lirically, "Feliz Cumpleaños Ferxxo" refers, although the singer congratulates himself in the title of the song, its lyrics have nothing to do with the date of his birth. The song talks about how an ex-girlfriend whom he remembers when he goes out partying and with whom he would like to get closer has changed. The lyrics includes, "Tú y yo haciendo de todo / Tú estás pa' andar con este gato no con ese pirobo / Tú estás solita y yo también, también estoy solo / Tómate algo, vamos a perrear, a hacer de todo / Qué los pana' míos a tus amigas le hacen coro".

== Music video ==
The music video was released simultaneously with the single on Feid's YouTube channel, on August 19, 2022. The video is the work of Gian Rivera and was recorded in Barcelona. The piece shows Feid alongside some of his collaborators and producers. In the video, we can see that they all get into a van, pick up a cake and head to the celebration of a children's birthday party. Several of the participants in the video come out blowing out the candles at the event.

== Charts ==
Weekly chart performance for "Feliz Cumpleaños Ferxxo"
Chart (2022–2023)	Peak position
Argentina (Argentina Hot 100)	33
Bolivia Songs (Billboard)	3
Bolivia (Monitor Latino)	9
Central America (Monitor Latino)	3
Chile Songs (Billboard)	6
Chile Urban (Monitor Latino)	20
Colombia Songs (Billboard)	1
Colombia (Monitor Latino)	4
Costa Rica (Monitor Latino)	18
Dominican Republic Urban (Monitor Latino)	16
Ecuador Songs (Billboard)	1
Ecuador (Monitor Latino)	8
El Salvador (Monitor Latino)	13
Global 200 (Billboard)	61
Guatemala (Monitor Latino)	18
Honduras (Monitor Latino)	3
Mexico (Billboard)	24
Nicaragua (Monitor Latino)	9
Panama Urban (Monitor Latino)	8
Paraguay (Monitor Latino)	7
Peru (Monitor Latino)	2
Peru Songs (Billboard)	1
Spain Top 100 Songs	9
US Hot Latin Songs (Billboard)	20
US Latin Rhythm Airplay (Billboard)	20

== Certifications ==
Certifications for "Feliz Cumpleaños Ferxxo"
Region	Certification	Certified units/sales
Brazil (Pro-Música Brasil)	Gold	20,000^{‡}
Spain (PROMUSICAE)	5× Platinum	300,000^{‡}
Streaming
Central America (CFC)	3× Platinum	21,000,000^{†}
^{‡} Sales+streaming figures based on certification alone.^{†} Streaming-only figures based on certification alone.
