= Feliz Cumpleaños Ferxxo Te Pirateamos el Álbum =

Studio album by Feid
- Released: 14 September 2022
- Genre: Reggaeton; Latin trap
- Length: 38:40
- Language: Spanish
- Label: Universal Latino
- Producer: Sky; Jowan; Pardo; Rolo; Wain; Federico Vindver; Rio Root; Feid

Feid chronology
Inter Shibuya: Ferxxo Edition (2021)	Feliz Cumpleaños Ferxxo Te Pirateamos el Álbum (2022)	Sixdo (2022)

Singles from Feliz Cumpleaños Ferxxo Te Pirateamos el Álbum
- 1. "Nieve" Released: 4 March 2022; 2. "Castigo" Released: 13 May 2022; 3. "Ferxxo 100" Released: 3 June 2022; 4. "Normal" Released: 8 July 2022; 5. "Si Te La Encuentras Por Ahí" Released: 5 August 2022; 6. "Feliz Cumpleaños Ferxxo" Released: 19 August 2022; 7. "Prohibidox" Released: 16 October 2022; 8. "XQ Te Pones Así" Released: 29 November 2022; 9. "La Buena Fai" Released: 14 September 2024

Feliz Cumpleaños Ferxxo Te Pirateamos el Álbum (stylized in all caps) is the fifth studio album by Colombian singer and songwriter Feid, released on 14 September 2022, through Universal Music Latino. It was produced by Sky, Jowan, Pardo, Rolo, Wain, Federico Vindver, Rio Root and Feid himself. Puerto Rican singer Yandel and Colombian producer Sky also appear as featured artists in the album.

The album spanned eight singles, "Nieve", "Castigo", "Ferxxo 100", "Normal", "Si Te La Encuentras Por Ahí", "Feliz Cumpleaños Ferxxo", "Prohibidox" and "XQ Te Pones Así", all released through 2022. Commercially, the album was highly successful, receiving certifications in the United States, Spain and Argentina. At the Billboard 200 chart, it peaked at number 188, being Feid's first appearance in the chart.

== Background ==
On 19 August 2022, Feid released the title track of the album as a single to celebrate his 30th birthday. The same day, he announced that the album was set to be released later in the year on December. On September, Feid announced via his Instagram account that the album had been leaked, deciding to advance the release of the album. He also announced that on 1 December, the original date of release for the album, he would release another album as a continuation with the songs that did not make the first project. Feliz Cumpleaños Ferxxo Te Pirateamos el Álbum was ultimately released on 14 September 2022, its name makes reference to the incident, translating to "Happy Birthday Ferxxo, We Pirated your Album". Similar to the title, the cover art for the album also alludes to the leak, featuring a WhatsApp conversation about it. The cover was designed by Manuela Villada, Feid's sister, who has designed the cover for his previous albums.

About the leak, Feid said "I was incomplete, it was a disaster and I felt anger, but that feeling lasted about half an hour, after that, I spoke to my mom to see how we could take advantage of the situation, and luckily, we reacted quickly". In response to the leak, the songs were mastered and mixed in less than a day to prepare the release of the project. It features production from Colombian producer Sky Rompiendo, who had previously worked with Feid in Inter Shibuya – La Mafia (2021), as well as from producers Jowan, Pardo, Federico Vindver and Rio Root, plus mixing and engineering by Wain, Mosty and Rolo. All the songs were written by Feid and producers except "Intro", which contains people singing "Happy Birthday to You" in Spanish, Mildred J. Hill and Patty Hill are credited as writers.

To promote the album, Feid embarked on a tour through United States titled U.S. Trip, produced by Live Nation. Initially intended to be in small clubs, following the success of the album it was decided that the tour would take place in larger venues. The tour spanned fourteen cities starting on 13 October at Buckhead Theatre in Atlanta and ending on 25 November at The Belasco in Los Angeles.

On 1 December 2022, he released Sixdo, a six-song EP composed of songs originally intended for Feliz Cumpleaños Ferxxo Te Pirateamos el Álbum. It features collaborations with Zion & Lennox, Ak4:20, Taiko, Jory Boy and DJ Premier.

== Singles ==
On 4 March 2022, "Nieve" was released as the first single for the album. On 13 May, a second single titled "Castigo" was released. The following month, "Ferxxo 100" was released as the third single on 3 June. All three songs appeared on the Colombia Songs chart, with the latter peaking at number three.

"Normal" was released on 8 July as the fourth single. It topped the Colombia Songs chart and peaked at number 42 and 75 at the Hot Latin Songs and the Billboard Global 200 charts, respectively. A fifth single titled "Si Te La Encuentras Por Ahí" was released on 5 August. The title track was released on 19 August as the sixth and final single for the album. It also topped the Colombia Songs chart and peaked at number nine in Spain.

Three of the singles received certifications in the United States: "Ferxxo 100", "Castigo" and "Normal", the first two being certified gold and the latter platinum. Additionally, "Normal" and "Feliz Cumpleaños Ferxxo" were certified gold in Argentina, with the latter also being certified platinum in Spain.

== Reception ==
Professional ratings
Review scores
Source	Rating
Mondo Sonoro	8/10 stars

Luis Maínez from the website Mondo Sonoro rated the album an eight out of ten calling it "well rounded". He highlighted the track "Belixe" as the standout song of the album as well as one of the best song of Feid's career. American magazine Billboard included the album in their list for "50 Best Albums of 2022", placing it at number 38. Ingrid Fajardo wrote that "Feid's songwriting prowess and crisp lyricism give this album a different and unique magic; the earworm singles also connected with Gen Z through social media, resulting in many of 2022's most powerful anthems".

=== Year-end lists ===
Publication	Accolade	Rank	Ref.
Billboard	50 Best Albums of 2022	38	
Shock	50 Best Colombian Albums of 2022	4	

== Commercial performance ==
In the United States, the album entered the Billboard 200 chart on 2 October 2022, at number 188, leaving the chart the next week. Feliz Cumpleaños Ferxxo Te Pirateamos el Álbum became Feid's first appearance in the chart. At the Top Latin Albums, it entered at number 25 peaking at number eight the following week, being his highest appearance in the chart to date. On 7 November 2022, it was certified platinum by the Recording Industry Association of America after selling over 60,000 copies in the country.

Feliz Cumpleaños Ferxxo Te Pirateamos el Álbum was also certified gold in Argentina and platinum in Spain, after selling over ten and forty thousand copies in each country respectively. Additionally, with over 7 million streams it was certified platinum in Central America by the Certificación Fonográfica Centroamericana. In Feid's native country, Colombia, all tracks from the album except "Intro" and "La Buena Fai" entered the Colombia Songs chart.

== Track listing ==
Feliz Cumpleaños Ferxxo Te Pirateamos el Álbum track listing
No.	Title	Writer(s)	Producer(s)	Length
1.	"Intro"	Mildred J. Hill; Patty Hill	Rolo; Wain	0:33
2.	"Castigo"	Salomón Villada Hoyos; Alejandro Ramírez Suárez; Esteban Higuita Estrada	Sky	2:57
3.	"Feliz Cumpleaños Ferxxo"	Villada Hoyos; Ramírez Suárez; Higuita Estrada; Andrés David Restrepo Echevarría; Johan Esteban Espinosa Cuervo	Sky; Jowan	2:35
4.	"Nieve"	Villada Hoyos; Ramírez Suárez; Restrepo Echevarría	Sky	2:20
5.	"Ferxxo 100"	Villada Hoyos; Ramírez Suárez; Higuita Estrada; Restrepo Echevarría; Espinosa Cuervo; Sébastien Julien Alfred	Sky; Jowan	2:47
6.	"Belixe"	Villada Hoyos; Ramírez Suárez; Higuita Estrada; Restrepo Echevarría	Sky	2:35
7.	"XQ Te Pones Así" (with Yandel)	Villada Hoyos; Ramírez Suárez; Higuita Estrada; Restrepo Echevarría; Espinosa Cuervo; Andrés Jael Correa; Daniel Taborda; Llandel Veguilla Malave; Luis Miguel Pardo	Sky; Jowan; Pardo	3:38
8.	"X20X"	Villada Hoyos; Ramírez Suárez; Higuita Estrada; Restrepo Echevarría; Espinoza Cuervo; Alfred	Sky; Jowan	1:43
9.	"Prohibidox"	Villada Hoyos; Higuita Estrada; Federico Vindver	Federico Vindver; Rio Root	2:46
10.	"Lady Mi Amor"	Villada Hoyos; Ramírez Suárez; Higuita Estrada; Restrepo Echevarría; Espinosa Cuervo; Pardo	Sky; Jowan; Pardo	2:27
11.	"Quemando Calorías" (featuring Sky Rompiendo)	Villada Hoyos; Ramírez Suárez	Sky	3:02
12.	"Aguante"	Villada Hoyos; Ramírez Suárez; Higuita Estrada; Restrepo Echevarría; Espinosa Cuervo; Taborda	Sky	2:44
13.	"Si Te La Encuentras Por Ahí"	Villada Hoyos; Ramírez Suárez; Higuita Estrada; Restrepo Echevarría; Espinosa Cuervo; Andrés Jael Correa	Sky; Jowan	3:11
14.	"Normal"	Villada Hoyos; Ramírez Suárez	Sky	2:51
15.	"La Buena Fai"	Villada Hoyos; Ramírez Suárez; Higuita Estrada	Sky; Feid	2:24
Total length:				38:40

== Charts ==
=== Weekly charts ===
Weekly chart performance for Feliz Cumpleaños Ferxxo Te Pirateamos el Álbum
Chart (2022)	Peak position
Spanish Albums (PROMUSICAE)	2
US Billboard 200	188
US Top Latin Albums (Billboard)	8
US Latin Rhythm Albums (Billboard)	5
US Heatseekers Albums (Billboard)	12

=== Year-end charts ===
2022 year-end chart performance for Feliz Cumpleaños Ferxxo Te Pirateamos el Álbum
Chart (2022)	Position
Spanish Albums (PROMUSICAE)	11
US Top Latin Albums (Billboard)	56

2023 year-end chart performance for Feliz Cumpleaños Ferxxo Te Pirateamos el Álbum
Chart (2023)	Position
Spanish Albums (PROMUSICAE)	9

== Certifications ==
Certifications for Feliz Cumpleaños Ferxxo Te Pirateamos el Álbum
Region	Certification	Certified units/sales
Argentina (CAPIF)	Gold	10,000^{^}
Central America (CFC)	Platinum	
Mexico (AMPROFON)	Platinum+Gold	210,000^{‡}
Spain (PROMUSICAE)	2× Platinum	80,000^{‡}
United States (RIAA)	Platinum (Latin)	60,000^{‡}
Streaming
Central America (CFC)	Platinum	7,000,000^{†}
^{^} Shipments figures based on certification alone.^{‡} Sales+streaming figures based on certification alone.^{†} Streaming-only figures based on certification alone.

== Credits ==
- Feid – vocals, songwriting, production (track 15), engineering
- Sky – featured artist (track 11), songwriting, production
- Yandel – featured artist, songwriting (track 7)
- Jowan (Johan Esteban Espinosa Cuervo) – production, songwriting
- Rolo – production (track 1), engineering
- Wain – production (track 1), mastering, mixing
- Pardo (Luis Miguel Pardo) – production (tracks 7, 8, 10), songwriting
- Federico Vindver – production (track 9), songwriting, engineering
- Rio Root – production (track 9)
- Esteban Higuita Estrada – songwriting
- Andrés David Restrepo Echevarría – songwriting
- Mildred J. Hill – songwriting (track 1)
- Patty Hill – songwriting (track 1)
- Sébastien Julien Alfred – songwriting (tracks 5, 8)
- Andrés Jael Correa – songwriting (track 7)
- Daniel Taborda – songwriting (tracks 7, 12)
- Mosty – mastering, mixing
- Manuela Villada – artwork
