= Niamh Coyle =

Irish camogie player

Personal information
- Native name: Niamh Níc Giolla Comhghaill (Irish)
- Born: County Roscommon, Ireland

Sport
- Sport: Camogie
- Position: Centre field
- Position: Centre field
Club
Years	Club	Apps (scores)
	Four Roads	?
Inter-county
- Years: County
- Roscommon

Niamh Coyle is a camogie player from County Roscommon in Ireland. She was a winner of a Soaring Star award in 2009. She also won a Roscommon "player of the year award" in 2009 for her role in helping Roscommon achieve victory in the (junior) Nancy Murray Cup, coming from five points down to defeat Armagh in the final by three points. She won a Roscommon intermediate club football title in 2008 with Four Roads.
