= Inter Shibuya – La Mafia =

Studio album by Feid
- Released: August 20, 2021
- Genre: Reggaeton
- Length: 36:54
- Label: Universal Music Latino
- Producer: Sky Rompiendo; Jowan; Taiko; Feid; Icon; Foreign Teck; BassCharity; Pardo; Alex Petit; Noize; SOG; CashMoneyAP; YoungKio; Daniel Moras; Tonedownforwhat; Mawty Maw; The Rudeboyz; Ily Wonder

Feid chronology
Ferxxo (Vol 1: M.O.R) (2020)	Inter Shibuya – La Mafia (2021)	Feliz Cumpleaños Ferxxo Te Pirateamos el Álbum (2022)

Singles from Inter Shibuya – La Mafia
- 1. "Chimbita" Released: December 11, 2020; 2. "14 de Febrero" Released: February 12, 2021; 3. "Purrito Apa" Released: April 2, 2021; 4. "Fumeteo" Released: June 10, 2021; 5. "Tengo Fe" Released: July 23, 2021; 6. "Si Tú Supieras" Released: August 20, 2021; 7. "Vacaxiones" Released: October 29, 2021; 8. "Monastery" Released: November 12, 2021; 9. "Fumeteo (Remix)" Released: November 26, 2021; 10. "Friki" Released: December 10, 2021

Inter Shibuya – La Mafia (stylized in all caps) is the fourth studio album by Colombian singer Feid, released on August 20, 2021, through Universal Music Latino. It was produced by Sky Rompiendo, Jowan, Taiko, ICON, Foreign Teck, BassCharity, Pardo, Alex Petit and Feid himself, Sky Rompiendo and ICON also appear as guest artists. A special edition of the album was released on December 17, 2021, titled Inter Shibuya (Ferxxo Edition), containing nine more songs including collaborations with Karol G, Ryan Castro, The Rudeboyz, Eladio Carrión, Mora and Sael.

The album peaked at numbers 29 and 20 at the Top Latin Albums and Latin Rhythm Albums charts, respectively, being his first and only appearance in the latter chart. It also peaked at number 18 at the Spanish Albums chart, while the special edition peaked at 21. The album won Album of the Year – New Artist at the 2022 Premios Tu Música Urbano.

== Background ==
The album was produced during the COVID-19 pandemic and was recorded in both Medellín, Colombia and Miami, United States. It was mostly produced by Colombian record producer Sky Rompiendo, who had previously worked on several occasions with Feid, including his first song "Morena", released in 2016. On August 2, 2021, Feid announced the date release of the album via his Instagram account, he also shared its cover, title, tracklist and producers for each song, the tracklist included a bonus track as the fifteenth song in the album which later was announced to be "Si Tú Supieras" after being chosen by his fans. The title derives from the street ward of Shibuya in Tokyo and comes from the Feid's admiration of Japanese culture, he said that "for me, the intersection represents a meeting point and this is a way to say that I want a lot of people to get drawn to my album". The album cover shows four intersecting circles in the CMYK color model, each representing one of his four studio albums, it was designed by his sister and painted by his father.

Inter Shibuya was inspired by the reggaeton songs from the early 2000s that got Feid into the genre, he said that "beyond a tribute, I wanted to find my space in reggaeton, give myself my place. I had always thought, how do I live like a classic? How do I live in that moment? Because what made me fall in love with reggaeton is not what it sounds like now, what (sounds) now is the music of my generation, which is super cool. But what made me fall in love with reggaeton was Baila Morena by Héctor & Tito; Motivando a la Yal, the Zion & Lennox album; Barrio Fino, Daddy Yankee's album", he continued by saying that "I wanted to make, in this album in particular, a journey through the types of reggaeton songs that I personally liked to listen to when I was a big fan and deeply into reggaeton".

To promote the album and its special edition, Feid embarked on the tour VACAXIONES con el Ferxxo which spanned through several cities in Colombia such as Bogotá and Cali, the tour started on December 3, 2021, with a concert in Villavicencio.

== Singles ==
The album spawned five singles, one released in 2020, "Chimbita" featuring Colombian producer Sky Rompiendo on December 11, and the other four in 2021, "14 de Febrero" on February 12, "Purrito Apa" on April 2, "Fumeteo" on June 10 and "Tengo Fe" on July 23. The special edition of the album was promoted with four singles, all of them released through 2021, "Vacaxiones" on October 29, "Monastery" featuring Ryan Castro on November 12, "Fumeteo (Remix)" featuring Mora and Eladio Carrión on November 26 and "Friki" featuring Karol G on December 10.

Despite "Friki" being the only single to chart in an American chart, peaking at number 34 at the Hot Latin Songs chart, all singles with the exception of "14 de Febrero", "Monastery" and the remix of "Fumeteo" received certifications in United States, platinum for "Vacaxiones", "Fumeteo", "Chimbita" and "Friki", and gold for "Tengo Fe" and "Purrito Apa", the songs "Amor de Mi Vida" and "Si Tú Supieras" were also certified in the country, gold for the former and platinum for the latter. Additionally, three of the singles were certified in Mexico in 2022, platinum for "Monastery" and "Friki", and gold for "Chimbita".

Following the release of Inter Shibuya – La Mafia, all of its tracks appeared on the Top 200 most streamed songs in Spotify Colombia while the album appeared at the fifth position in the Top 10 Global Album Debuts of Spotify.

== Track listing ==
Inter Shibuya – La Mafia track listing
No.	Title	Writer(s)	Producer(s)	Length
1.	"Corone"	Salomón Villada Hoyos; Alejandro Ramirez; Andres David Restrepo Echavarría; Johan Esteban Espinosa; Nicolás Jaña Galleguillos	Sky Rompiendo; Jowan; Taiko	2:42
2.	"Chimbita" (featuring Sky Rompiendo)	Villada Hoyos; Ramirez	Sky Rompiendo	2:36
3.	"Tengo Fe"	Villada Hoyos; Ramirez	Sky Rompiendo; Feid	2:26
4.	"Como Cuando"	Villada Hoyos; Ramirez	Sky Rompiendo; Taiko	2:41
5.	"Jordan IV"	Villada Hoyos; Ramirez; Restrepo Echavarría; Espinosa; Jaña Galleguillos; Andrés Correa Ríos	Sky Rompiendo; Jowan; Taiko	2:42
6.	"Fumeteo"	Villada Hoyos; Ramirez; Espinosa	Sky Rompiendo; Jowan; Feid	2:14
7.	"Purrito Apa" (featuring ICON)	Villada Hoyos; Ramirez; Espinosa; Rolo; Nicole Betancur Gomez	Sky Rompiendo; Jowan; Icon	2:31
8.	"XXXX"	Villada Hoyos; Ramirez; Restrepo Echavarría; Espinosa; Michael Hernandez	Sky Rompiendo; Foreign Teck; BassCharity	1:57
9.	"Ferxxo VI"	Villada Hoyos; Ramirez; Betancur Gomez	Sky Rompiendo; Feid	1:42
10.	"Hulu"	Villada Hoyos; Ramirez; Esteban Higuita Estrada	Sky Rompiendo	2:01
11.	"Hectol"	Villada Hoyos; Ramirez; Espinosa; Jaña Galleguillos; Luis Miguel Pardo	Sky Rompiendo; Jowan; Taiko; Pardo	2:40
12.	"El Padrino"	Villada Hoyos; Ramirez; Restrepo Echavarría; Espinosa; Hernandez	Sky Rompiendo; Jowan; Foreign Teck; BassCharity	2:48
13.	"Te Mata"	Villada Hoyos; Ramirez	Sky Rompiendo	1:53
14.	"14 de Febrero"	Villada Hoyos; Ramirez; Benjamin Lasnier; Daniel Davidsen; Mirza	Sky Rompiendo	2:38
15.	"Si Tú Supieras"	Villada Hoyos	Alex Petit	3:16
Total length:				36:54

Inter Shibuya (Ferxxo Edition) track listing
No.	Title	Writer(s)	Producer(s)	Length
16.	"Vacaxiones"	Villada Hoyos; Daniel Luis Rodriguez	Noize; Feid	3:06
17.	"Friki" (featuring Karol G)	Villada Hoyos; Ramirez; Rodriguez; Carolina Giraldo Navarro; Esteban Higuita Estrada	Sky Rompiendo; Noize	2:25
18.	"Monastery" (featuring Ryan Castro)	Villada Hoyos; Daniel Pineda Foronda; Ryan Castro; Santiago Orrego Gallego	SOG	3:09
19.	"Comment"	Villada Hoyos; Alex Petit; Daniel Moras Raab; Kiowa Roukema; Marthaniel O. Roberts; Umvangsi Poukouta	CashMoneyAP; YoungKio; Daniel Moras; Tonedownforwhat; Mawty Maw	2:50
20.	"8 Diax"	Villada Hoyos; Restrepo Echavarría; Espinosa	Jowan	2:21
21.	"Rudeboyz" (featuring The Rudeboyz)	Villada Hoyos; Andrés Uribe Marín; Bryan Lezcano; Kevin Jimenez	The Rudeboyz; Ily Wonder	3:06
22.	"Amor de mi Vida"	Villada Hoyos; Ramirez	Sky Rompiendo	3:09
23.	"Fumeteo - Remix" (featuring Eladio Carrión and Mora)	Villada Hoyos; Ramirez; Espinosa; Eladio Carrión; Gabriel Mora Quintero	Sky Rompiendo; Jowan	3:34
24.	"Mionca al Bloque" (featuring Sael)	Villada Hoyos; Ramirez; Restrepo Echavarría; Espinosa; Santiago Elias Mercado Gomez	Jowan	2:52
Total length:				73:29

Notes

- All tracks are stylized in all caps; except "14 de Febrero" and "Monastery".

== Charts ==
=== Weekly charts ===
Weekly chart performance for Inter Shibuya – La Mafia
Chart (2021)	Peak position
Spanish Albums (PROMUSICAE)	18
US Top Latin Albums (Billboard)	29
US Latin Rhythm Albums (Billboard)	20
US Heatseekers Albums (Billboard)	15

Weekly chart performance for Inter Shibuya – Ferxxo Edition
Chart (2022)	Peak position
Spanish Albums (PROMUSICAE)	20

=== Year-end charts ===
Year-end chart performance for Inter Shibuya - Ferxxo Edition
Chart (2022)	Position
Spanish Albums (PROMUSICAE)	53

Year-end chart performance for Inter Shibuya - La Mafia
Chart (2023)	Position
Spanish Albums (PROMUSICAE)	82

== Certifications ==
Certifications for Inter Shibuya – La Mafia
Region	Certification	Certified units/sales
Spain (PROMUSICAE)	Gold	20,000^{‡}
United States (RIAA)	Platinum (Latin)	60,000^{‡}
^{‡} Sales+streaming figures based on certification alone.
