= Neev =

Neev is a pronunciation of the Irish name Niamh.

Neev may also refer to:

- Neev, Portuguese singer, (notable for "Breathe")
- DJ Neev, UK-based Sikh radio DJ
- Neycho Neev (born 1948), Bulgarian politician, vice-Prime Minister and minister
- Neev, an Indian TV show aired in 1990s
