= Nievas =

Nievas is a surname. Notable people with the surname include:

- Adrián Nievas of the Argentine band Adicta
- Carlos Pérez-Nievas (born 1966), Spanish politician
- Alhambra Nievas (born 1983), Spanish women's rugby union international and rugby union referee
- Brian Nievas (born 1998), Argentine professional footballer
- Camila Nievas (1878–1941), Argentine teacher who fought for the intellectual emancipation of women
- Sasha Nievas (born 1998), Argentine weightlifter and crossfit athlete

== See also ==
- Nieva (disambiguation)
- Monte Nievas, is a village and rural locality (municipality) in La Pampa Province in Argentina
