= Ferxxo (Vol 1: M.O.R) =

2020 studio album by Feid

Studio album by Feid
- Released: 23 April 2020
- Length: 45:00
- Label: Universal Music Group; Universal Music Latino; In-Tu Linea (JP Entertainment)
- Producer: Blow Music; Feid; Jowan; Noize; Sky Rompiendo; Wain

Feid chronology
19 (2019)	Ferxxo (Vol 1: M.O.R) (2020)	Inter Shibuya - La Mafia (2021)

Singles from Ferxxo (Vol 1: M.O.R)
- 1. "Fresh Kerias" Released: 1 November 2019; 2. "Porfa" Released: 13 December 2019; 3. "Ateo" Released: 31 January 2020; 4. "Borraxxa" Released: 14 February 2020

Ferxxo (Vol 1: M.O.R) (stylized in all caps) is the third studio album by Colombian singer-songwriter Feid. The acronym "M.O.R" stands for "messages on repeat" and is also a Colombian slang word. M.O.R. was composed by Feid and co-produced by Wain and Sky Rompiendo. The album became associated with the 2019–2020 Colombian protests when protesters began using lyrics on signs. It was nominated for a Latin Grammy Award for Best Urban Music Album.

== Track listing ==
FERXXO (VOL 1: M.O.R)
No.	Title	Writer(s)	Producer(s)	Length
1.	"XX"	Feid	Wain	1:53
2.	"Ateo"	Wain; Sky Rompiendo; Feid	Sky Rompiendo	2:18
3.	"Xntxs"	Feid	Wain	2:27
4.	"Fresh Kerias" (with Maluma, Sky)	Feid; Maluma; Sky Rompiendo; Wain	Sky Rompiendo	4:32
5.	"Porfa" (with Justin Quiles)	Sky Rompiendo; Feid; Justin Quiles	Sky Rompiendo	3:52
6.	"Borraxxa" (with Manuel Turizo)	Sky Rompiendo; Manuel Turizo; Feid	Sky Rompiendo	3:43
7.	"Cu U U U Ux"	Álvaro Díaz; Feid	Wain	3:15
8.	"X19X"	Feid	Noize; Wain	2:41
9.	"Relxjxte" (with Sky)	Sky Rompiendo; Feid	Sky Rompiendo	3:05
10.	"Videitoxx"	Feid	Wain	3:05
11.	"Excxsxs"	Feid	Feid	2:22
12.	"Morxx"	Feid	Feid; Wain	2:13
13.	"El Cuxrto de Ferxxo"	Duvalier Torres; Douglas Villasmil; Tezzel; MusikMan; Feid	Blow Music; Jowan	2:31
14.	"Tx Vxs"	Noize; Mosty; Feid	Noize	3:41
15.	"Perreoxoxo"	Feid	Feid; Wain	1:31
16.	"Avxntadxr"	Feid	Wain	2:16

== Charts ==
=== Weekly charts ===
Chart (2020)	Peak position
US Top Latin Albums (Billboard)	27

=== Year-end charts ===
Chart (2020)	Position
US Top Latin Albums (Billboard)	72

== Certifications ==
Region	Certification	Certified units/sales
Mexico (AMPROFON)	2× Platinum	120,000^{‡}
^{‡} Sales+streaming figures based on certification alone.
