= Castigo =

Single by Feid

from the album Feliz Cumpleaños Ferxxo Te Pirateamos el Álbum
- Language: Spanish
- English title: "Punishment"
- Released: May 13, 2022
- Genre: Reggaeton; Sandungueo
- Length: 2:57
- Label: Universal Latino
- Songwriters: Alejandro Ramírez; Esteban Higuita; Salomón Villada Hoyos
- Producer: Sky Rompiendo

Feid singles chronology
"Mojando Asientos" (2022)	"Castigo" (2022)	"La Inocente" (2022)

Music video
- "Castigo" on YouTube

"Castigo" (English: Punishment) is a song by Colombian singer Feid. It was released on May 12, 2022 through Universal Music Latino, as the second single from their fifth studio album Feliz Cumpleaños Ferxxo Te Pirateamos el Álbum (2022).

== Background and release ==
In May 2022, Feid announced the single via his social media, scheduled to be released on May 13. Later, he released his fifth studio album Feliz Cumpleaños Ferxxo Te Pirateamos el Álbum, and "Castigo" was included as the second track.

== Music and lyrics ==
"Castigo"
A 24 seconds audio sample of the chorus, which along with reggaeton shows a sandungueo melody.

Musically, "Castigo" is a reggaeton and sandungueo song to dance to. Lyrically, "Castigo" refers to many women who like to party with their friends without any interest in someone else inviting them and prefer to dance and enjoy themselves without the presence of men to interfere with their celebration. The lyrics includes, "No sé qué pasa conmigo / Que siempre que bailo contigo / Te digo cosas al oído / Te hablo malo, te quiero dar castigo / Aunque seamos solo amigos / No sé qué me pasa contigo / Que te hablo malo, te doy agresivo / Hoy voy a darte castigo, yeah".

== Music video ==
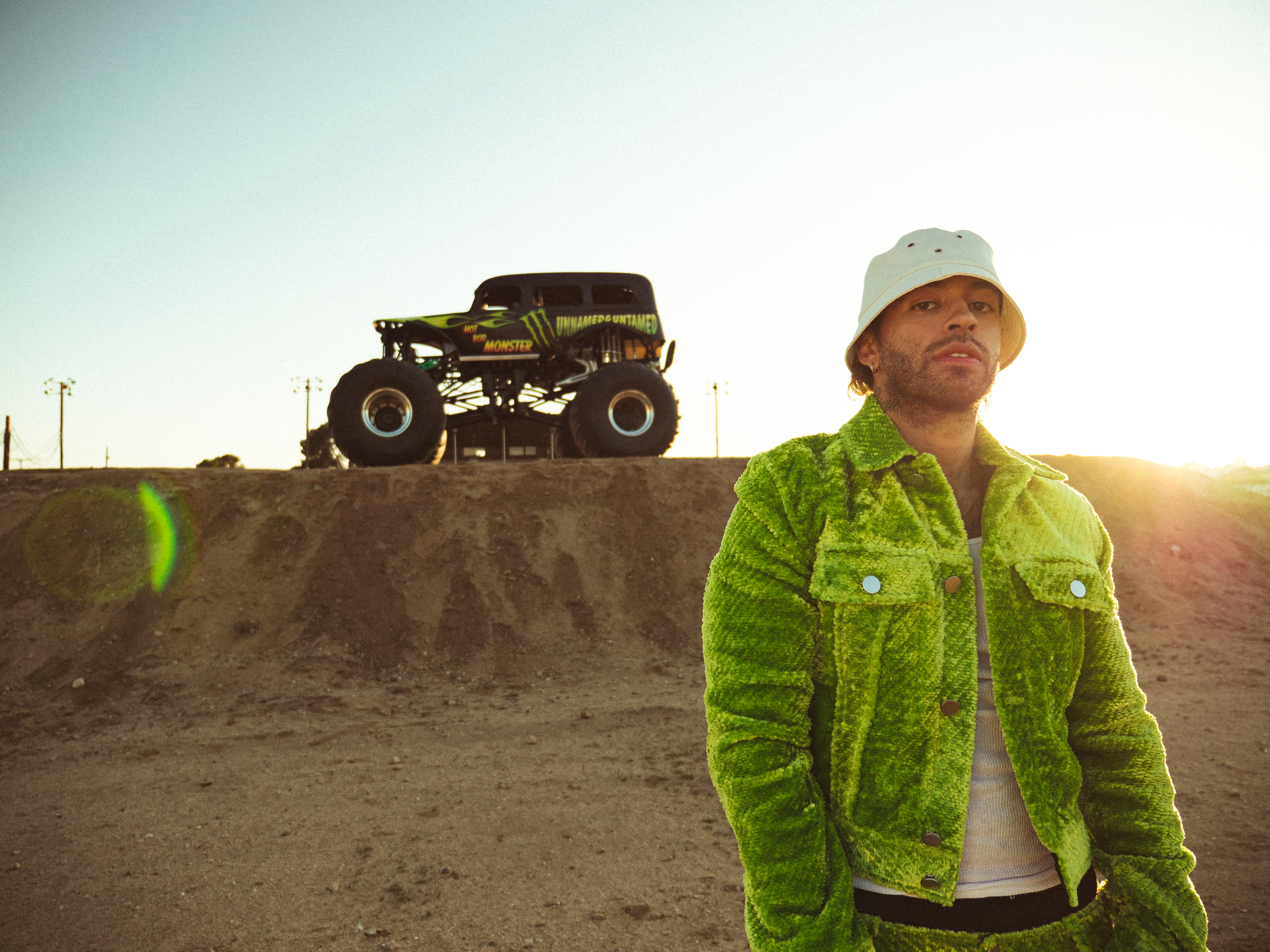
Alternative cover of the video clip for "Castigo"

The video clip was released simultaneously with the single on May 13, 2022. It shows Feid performing the song in a sandy place, near a race track and next to a car with big wheels, and then several women in a nightclub.

== Charts ==
Weekly chart performance for "Castigo"
Chart (2022)	Peak position
Colombia Songs (Billboard)	13
Spain Top 100 Songs	70

== Certifications ==
Certifications for "Castigo"
Region	Certification	Certified units/sales
Spain (Promusicae)	Platinum	60,000^{‡}
United States (RIAA)	Gold (Latin)	30,000^{‡}
Streaming
Central America (CFC)	Gold	3,500,000^{†}
^{‡} Sales+streaming figures based on certification alone.^{†} Streaming-only figures based on certification alone.
