= Nieve (song) =

Single by Feid

from the album Feliz Cumpleaños Ferxxo Te Pirateamos el Álbum
- Language: Spanish
- English title: "Snow"
- Released: March 4, 2022
- Genre: Reggaeton; electronic; tech house
- Length: 2:20
- Label: Universal Latino
- Songwriters: Salomón Villada Hoyos; Alejandro Ramírez; Andrés Restrepo
- Producer: Sky Rompiendo

Feid singles chronology
"Friki" (2021)	"Nieve" (2022)	"Pantysito" (2022)

Music video
- "Nieve" on YouTube

"Nieve" (English: Snow) is a song recorded and performed by the Colombian singer Feid. It was released on March 4, 2022 under the Universal Music Latino record label, as the first single from his sixth studio album Feliz Cumpleaños Ferxxo Te Pirateamos el Álbum (2022).

== Background and release ==
After the success of his song "Friki" with Karol G, at the end of February 2022 Feid announced the release of "Nieve", scheduled for March 4, 2022.

Feid later released his album Feliz Cumpleaños Ferxxo Te Pirateamos el Álbum, and "Nieve" was included as the fourth track.

== Music video ==
The official music video was released simultaneously with the single on March 3, 2022 and premiered on Feid's YouTube channel.

In it, we can first see a girl lighting a match and then we see other people trying a cigarette to smoke. Later, Feid is seen singing along with other people in a car and entering a luxurious place. Later, they reach a museum-style area and kneel Feid. Then, they talk to him. Afterwards, they begin to kick and hit him until he is lying on the ground. Then those who beat him leave and later a girl arrives to rescue him. The video ends in a car where the man and the girl fall in love and paint their faces red.

== Certifications ==
Certifications for "Nieve"
Region	Certification	Certified units/sales
Spain (PROMUSICAE)	Gold	30,000^{‡}
^{‡} Sales+streaming figures based on certification alone.
