= Un Cigarrillo =

Single by Chencho Corleone

from the album Solo
- English title: "A Cigarette"
- Released: May 4, 2023
- Recorded: 2023
- Genre: Reggaeton
- Length: 3:04
- Label: Cerco; Sony Latin
- Songwriters: Orlando Valle; Egbert Rosa
- Producers: Chencho Corleone; Haze

Chencho Corleone singles chronology
"Me Llamas" (2023)	"Un Cigarrillo" (2023)	"Podemos Repetirlo" (2023)

Music video
- "Un Cigarrillo" on YouTube

"Un Cigarrillo" (for Spanish: "A Cigarette") is a song by Puerto Rican singer Chencho Corleone. It was released on May 4, 2023, through Cerco and Sony Music Latin, as the first single from his debut studio album, Solo (2024). It is the first song that Corleone publishes alone.

== Background and release ==
After several years as part of the duo Plan B, Chencho began a career as an independent soloist in 2018, collaborating with different artists. On May 3, 2023, he finally announced that he signed a global agreement with the Sony Music Latin record label, in addition to the release of "Un Cigarette", his first single with the company. The song was released the next day, on May 4, 2023.

== Music video ==
The music video was released by Chencho Corleone's official YouTube channel along with the single on May 4, 2023. The video was directed by Jessy Terrero and depicts Chencho Corleone performing the song in a restaurant.

== Commercial performance ==
"Un Cigarrillo" debuted at number 13 on the Latin Rhythm Airplay and at number 38 on the Latin Airplay, both Billboard charts; while in his second he achieved his peak of 10 in the Latin Rhythm Airplay and 30 in the Latin Airplay. It was also included within the top five on the Monitor Latino charts in Peru, Puerto Rico and the Dominican Republic and within the top ten in Honduras and Mexico, as well as the top 70 in Spain.

== Charts ==
Weekly chart performance for "Un Cigarrillo"
Chart (2023)	Peak position
Dominican Republic (Monitor Latino)	1
Honduras (Monitor Latino)	8
Mexico (Monitor Latino)	1
Peru (Monitor Latino)	4
Puerto Rico (Monitor Latino)	4
Spain (PROMUSICAE)	70
US Hot Latin Songs (Billboard)	47
US Latin Airplay (Billboard)	1
US Latin Rhythm Airplay (Billboard)	1

== Certifications ==
Certifications and sales for "Un Cigarrillo"
Region	Certification	Certified units/sales
Chile	Gold	
United States (RIAA)	3× Platinum (Latin)	180,000^{‡}
^{‡} Sales+streaming figures based on certification alone.
