= Normal (Feid song) =

Single by Feid

from the album Feliz Cumpleaños Ferxxo Te Pirateamos el Álbum
- Language: Spanish
- Released: July 8, 2022
- Recorded: 2021–2022
- Genre: Reggaeton
- Length: 2:51
- Label: Universal Music Latino
- Songwriters: Alejandro Ramírez Suárez; Salomón Villada Hoyos
- Producer: Sky Rompiendo

Feid singles chronology
"Ultra Solo (Remix)" (2022)	"Normal" (2022)	"VIP" (2022)

Music video
- "Normal" on YouTube

"Normal" is a song by Colombian singer Feid. It was released on July 8, 2022, through Universal Music Latino, as the fourth single from his fifth studio album, Feliz Cumpleaños Ferxxo Te Pirateamos el Álbum (2022).

== Background and release ==
In 2021, Feid shared a preview of the song. After almost a year, at the beginning of July 2022 it announced its release date, scheduled for July 8.

Later, announced his album Feliz Cumpleaños Ferxxo Te Pirateamos el Álbum, and "Normal" was included as the fourteenth track.

"Normal"
A 27 seconds sample of the chorus of the song.

== Music video ==
The official music video for "Normal" was released simultaneously with the single on July 8, 2022. It shows Feid on a night out with his friends.

== Certifications ==
Certifications for "Normal"
Region	Certification	Certified units/sales
Spain (Promusicae)	5× Platinum	300,000^{‡}
United States (RIAA)	Platinum (Latin)	60,000^{‡}
Streaming
Central America (CFC)	2× Platinum	14,000,000^{†}
^{‡} Sales+streaming figures based on certification alone.^{†} Streaming-only figures based on certification alone.
