= Neves =

Neves, meaning "snows" in Portuguese, may refer to:

== People ==
- Neves (surname), a common surname in Portugal, Brazil, and the Spanish region of Galicia

== Places ==
=== Angola ===
- Neves, Angola, commune in the municipality of Humpata, province of Huíla

=== Brazil ===
- Neves Paulista, municipality in São Paulo
- Presidente Tancredo Neves, municipality in Bahia
- Riachão das Neves, municipality in Bahia
- Ribeirão das Neves, municipality in of Minas Gerais
- Tancredo Neves International Airport, in Belo Horizonte

=== Portugal ===
- Neves, the other name of the small parish of Norte Grande (Azores), in the Azores

=== São Tomé and Príncipe ===
- Neves, São Tomé and Príncipe, small town on the north west coast of São Tomé Island
- Neves Ferreira, São Tomé and Príncipe, village in the southern part of the island of Príncipe

=== Spain ===
- As Neves, in Galicia

== Other ==
- Neves (video game), a Nintendo DS puzzle game by Yuke's
