= Colonial Peak =

Mountain in Washington (state), United States

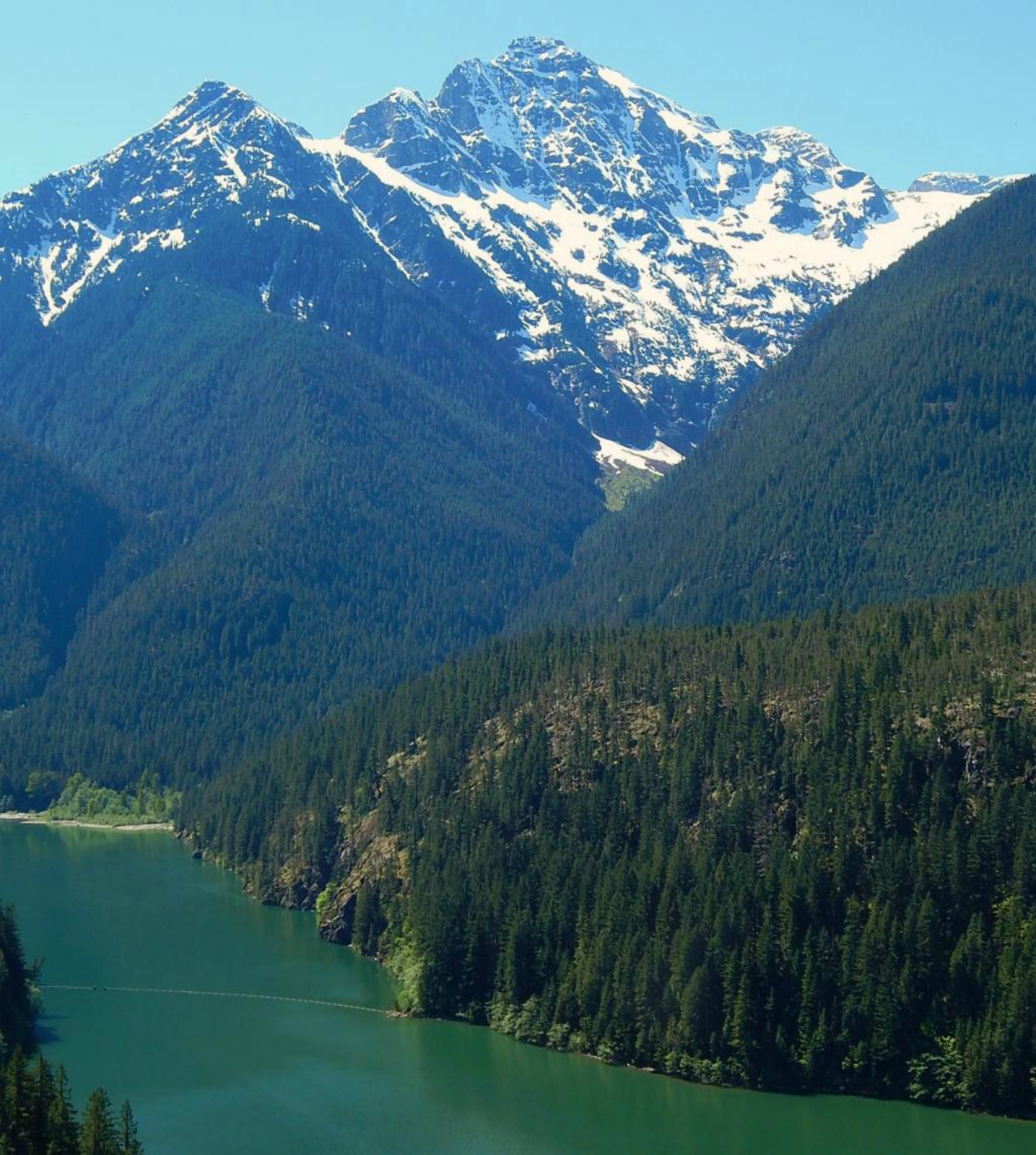
- Colonial Peak seen from Diablo Lake overlook

Highest point
- Elevation: 7,771 ft (2,369 m) NGVD 29
- Prominence: 1,171 ft (357 m)
- Coordinates: 48°39′41″N 121°07′16″W

Geography
- Location within Washington (state) Location within the United States
- Location: North Cascades National Park; Whatcom County; Washington, U.S.
- Parent range: North Cascades
- Topo map: USGS Ross Dam

Climbing
- First ascent: July 31, 1931 by William Degenhardt and Herbert Strandberg
- Easiest route: West Ridge: glacier/snow climb, scramble (class 3)

Colonial Peak is a mountain in the North Cascades of Washington, United States. It rises steeply from the southwest bank of Thunder Arm of Diablo Lake, one of the artificial reservoirs on the Skagit River. It is part of a group of peaks that form the northern end of a chain running south through prized climbing destinations such as Eldorado Peak, Forbidden Peak, and Goode Mountain. Colonial Peak takes its name from the Colonial mining claim on its slopes.

Like many North Cascade peaks, Colonial Peak is more notable for its large, steep rise above local terrain than for its absolute elevation. For example, it rises 6,560 feet (2,000 m) above Thunder Arm in only 2.3 horizontal miles (3.7 km). Its rise over the Skagit river on the northwest is even greater, but not as steep.

Colonial Peak was first climbed on July 31, 1931, by William Degenhardt and Herbert Strandberg of the Seattle Mountaineers. The standard route is the West Ridge, accessed from Colonial Glacier; the approach is via the Pyramid Lake Trail, starting from near Diablo Dam on the North Cascades Highway.

== Climate ==
Colonial Peak is located in the marine west coast climate zone of western North America. Most weather fronts originate in the Pacific Ocean, and travel northeast toward the Cascade Mountains. As fronts approach the North Cascades, they are forced upward by the peaks of the Cascade Range, causing them to drop their moisture in the form of rain or snowfall onto the Cascades (Orographic lift). As a result, the west side of the North Cascades experiences high precipitation, especially during the winter months in the form of snowfall. During winter months, weather is usually cloudy, but, due to high pressure systems over the Pacific Ocean that intensify during summer months, there is often little or no cloud cover during the summer. Because of maritime influence, snow tends to be wet and heavy, resulting in high avalanche danger.

== Geology ==
The North Cascades features some of the most rugged topography in the Cascade Range with craggy peaks, ridges, and deep glacial valleys. Geological events occurring many years ago created the diverse topography and drastic elevation changes over the Cascade Range leading to the various climate differences.

The history of the formation of the Cascade Mountains dates back millions of years ago to the late Eocene Epoch. With the North American Plate overriding the Pacific Plate, episodes of volcanic igneous activity persisted. In addition, small fragments of the oceanic and continental lithosphere called terranes created the North Cascades about 50 million years ago.

During the Pleistocene period dating back over two million years ago, glaciation advancing and retreating repeatedly scoured the landscape leaving deposits of rock debris. The U-shaped cross section of the river valleys is a result of recent glaciation. Uplift and faulting in combination with glaciation have been the dominant processes which have created the tall peaks and deep valleys of the North Cascades area.

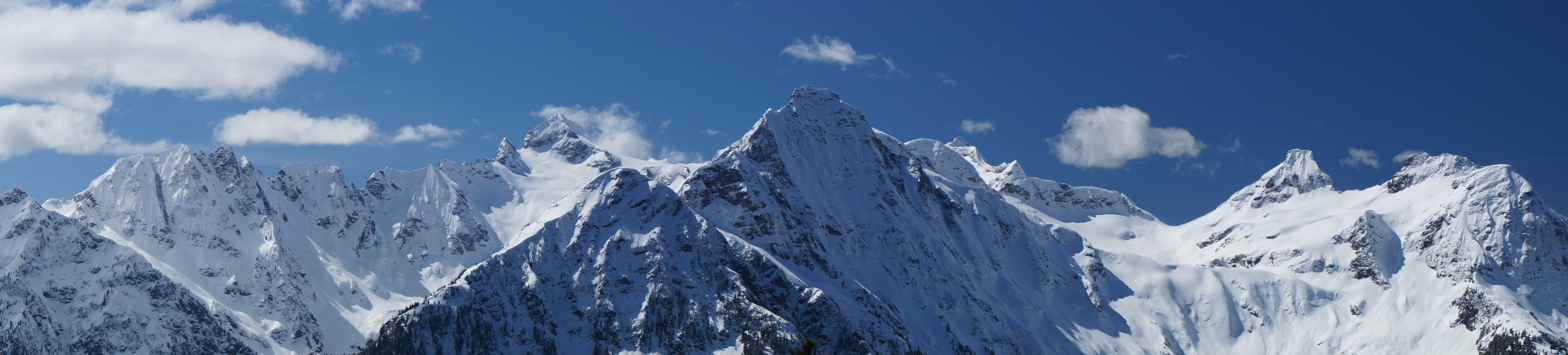
Colonial Peak (centered) seen from Ruby Mountain
