= Sourdough (disambiguation) =

Sourdough is a class of yeast colony, dough and bread

Sourdough may also refer to:

== People ==
- Forty-niner, California gold rush miners, nicknamed sourdoughs
- Sourdough (Yukon miner), Klondike gold rush miners
- Sourdough, a Yukoner, see List of adjectival and demonymic forms of place names

Persons

- Reuben D'Aigle (1874–1959; nicknamed "Sourdough"), Canadian prospector

== Places ==
- Sourdough, Montana, USA; an unincorporated community in Sweet Grass County
- Sourdough Draw, South Dakota, USA; a draw (valley)
- Sourdough Island, Missoula County, Montana, USA; an island, see List of islands of Montana
- Sourdough Lake, Park County, Montana, USA; a lake, see List of lakes of Park County, Montana
- Sourdough Mountains, Washington State, USA; a mountain range
- Sourdough Mountain (Whatcom County, Washington), USA; a mountain
- Sourdough Peak, Wrangell Mountains, Alaska, USA; a mountain
- Sourdough Glacier, Wind River Range, Wyoming, USA; a glacier

=== Facilities and structures ===
- Sourdough Lodge, Richardson Highway, Alaska, USA; an NRHP-listed roadhouse
- Sourdough Inn, Fort Yukon, Alaska, USA; an NRHP-listed hotel
- The Sourdough Saloon, Beatty, Nevada, USA; a Western saloon
- Sourdough Campground, North Fork Smith River (California), USA; a campground
- Sourdough Alley, Red Mountain Resort, Rossland, West Kootenay, British Columbia, Canada; a trail
- Sourdough Hill, Meagher County, Montana, USA; a trail, see List of trails of Meagher County, Montana

== Other uses ==
- Sourdough Air Transport, see List of defunct airlines of the United States (N–Z)
- Sourdough Expedition, the first climbing ascent of the tallest mountain in North America, Denali
- Sourdough (novel) by Robin Sloan
- The Sourdoughs (film), an alternate title for the 1952 'Abbott & Costello' film Lost in Alaska
- The Sourdough (magazine), the professional journal of the Alaska Library Association
- Project Sourdough, a cigarette marketing scheme, an alternate name for Project SCUM

== See also ==
- Category:Sourdough breads
- Sourdough Sam, the mascot of the NFL's SF 49ers
- Sourdough Mountain Lookout, a fire lookout in the Sourdough Mountains
- The Puratos Sourdough Library, a library of bread doughs at the Puratos Center in Saint-Vith, Belgium
- Bread (disambiguation)
- Dough (disambiguation)
- Sour (disambiguation)
