= Mantis Peak =

Mountain in Washington (state), United States

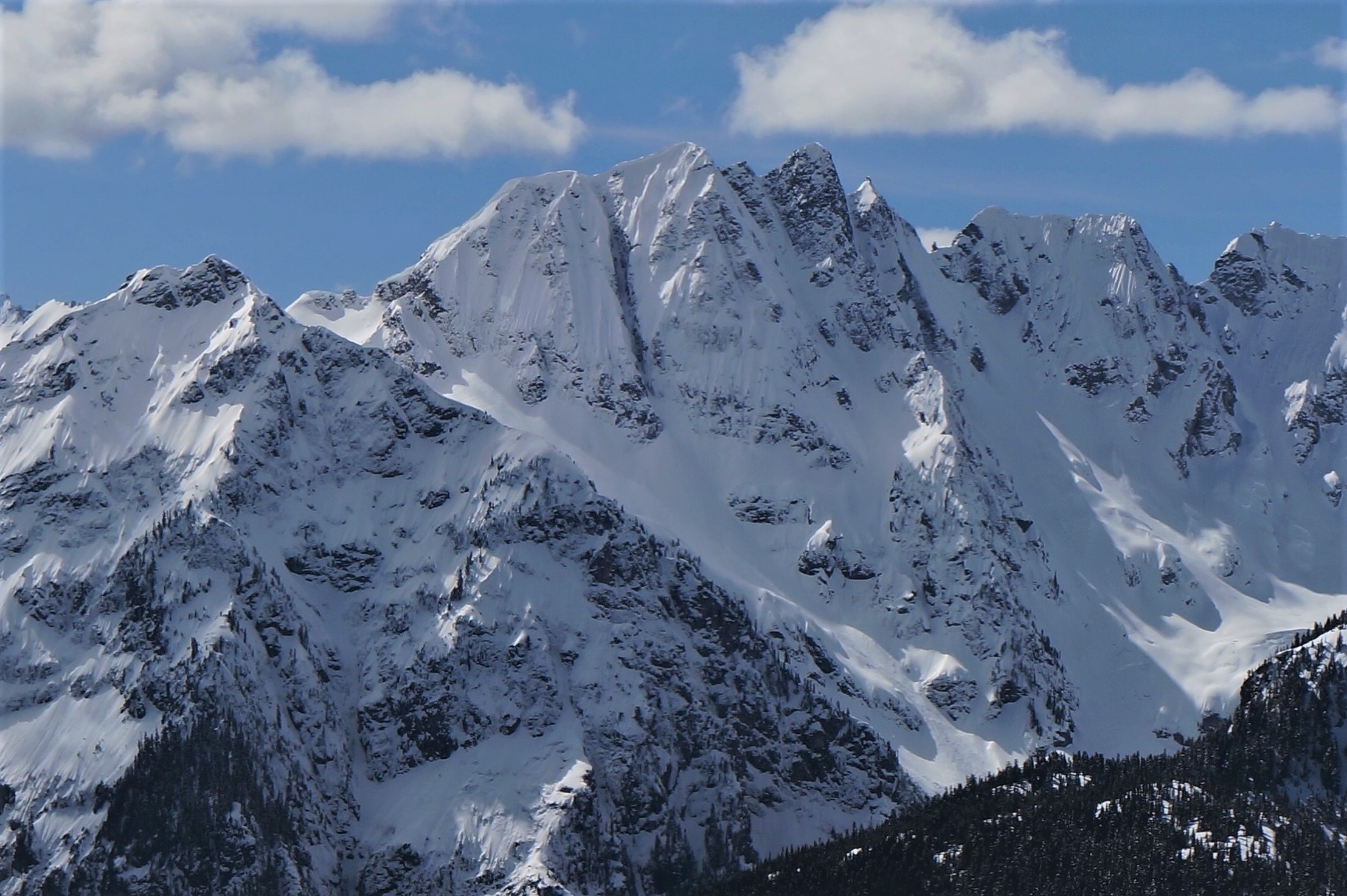
- Northeast aspect of Mantis Peak and Distal Phalanx seen from Ruby Mountain (Styloid Peak lower left)

Highest point
- Elevation: 7,614 ft (2,321 m)
- Prominence: 574 ft (175 m)
- Parent peak: Snowfield Peak (8,351 ft)
- Isolation: 1.11 mi (1.79 km)
- Coordinates: 48°38′09″N 121°06′43″W

Geography
- Location within Washington (state) Location within the United States
- Interactive map of Mantis Peak
- Country: United States
- State: Washington
- County: Skagit
- Protected area: North Cascades National Park
- Parent range: North Cascades; Cascade Range
- Topo map: USGS Ross Dam

Climbing
- First ascent: Mantis Peak: August 16, 1973, by Marilyn and Stan Jensen. Distal Phalanx: May 31, 1981, by John Roper, Dave Stonington, Ted Hegg, Charlie Janeway

Mantis Peak is the unofficial name of a 7,614-foot (2,321-metre) double-summit mountain located in North Cascades National Park in Skagit County of Washington state. The nearest higher peak is Snowfield Peak, 1.23 mi (1.98 km) to the west, and Styloid Peak rises 0.48 mi (0.77 km) to the east. Precipitation runoff from Mantis Peak drains into Neve Creek and McAllister Creek, both tributaries of Thunder Creek. With a steep north face sculpted by the Neve Glacier, relief is significant as the summit rises 4,000 feet above the head of Neve Creek valley in less than one mile, and the south side rises 5,400 feet above McAllister Creek valley in 1.5 mi (2.4 km). The first ascent of Mantis Peak was made August 16, 1973 by Marilyn and Stan Jensen. "Distal Phalanx", the slightly higher twin summit, was first climbed on May 31, 1981, by John Roper and party, on the same day that he climbed Styloid Peak. Roper, being a doctor, named some of his many first ascents for anatomical parts of the body.

== Climate ==
Mantis Peak is located in the marine west coast climate zone of western North America. Most weather fronts coming off the Pacific Ocean travel northeast toward the Cascade Mountains. As fronts approach the North Cascades, they are forced upward by the peaks of the Cascade Range (orographic lift), causing them to drop their moisture in the form of rain or snowfall onto the Cascades. As a result, the west side of the North Cascades experiences high precipitation, especially during the winter months in the form of snowfall. Because of maritime influence, snow tends to be wet and heavy, resulting in high avalanche danger. During winter months, weather is usually cloudy, but due to high pressure systems over the Pacific Ocean that intensify during summer months, there is often little or no cloud cover during the summer. The months of July through September offer the most favorable weather for viewing or climbing this peak.

== Geology ==
The North Cascades features some of the most rugged topography in the Cascade Range with craggy peaks, spires, ridges, and deep glacial valleys. Geological events occurring many years ago created the diverse topography and drastic elevation changes over the Cascade Range leading to the various climate differences.

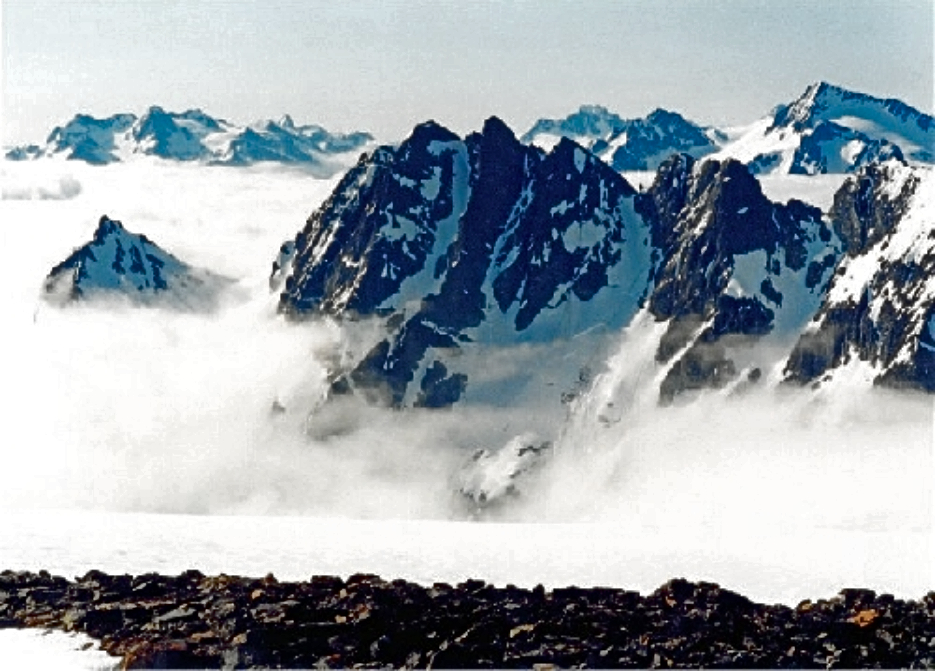
Northwest aspect of Mantis Peak and Distal Phalanx from Neve Peak

The history of the formation of the Cascade Mountains dates back millions of years ago to the late Eocene Epoch. With the North American Plate overriding the Pacific Plate, episodes of volcanic igneous activity persisted. In addition, small fragments of the oceanic and continental lithosphere called terranes created the North Cascades about 50 million years ago.

During the Pleistocene period dating back over two million years ago, glaciation advancing and retreating repeatedly scoured the landscape leaving deposits of rock debris. The U-shaped cross section of the river valleys is a result of recent glaciation. Uplift and faulting in combination with glaciation have been the dominant processes which have created the tall peaks and deep valleys of the North Cascades area.

== Gallery ==
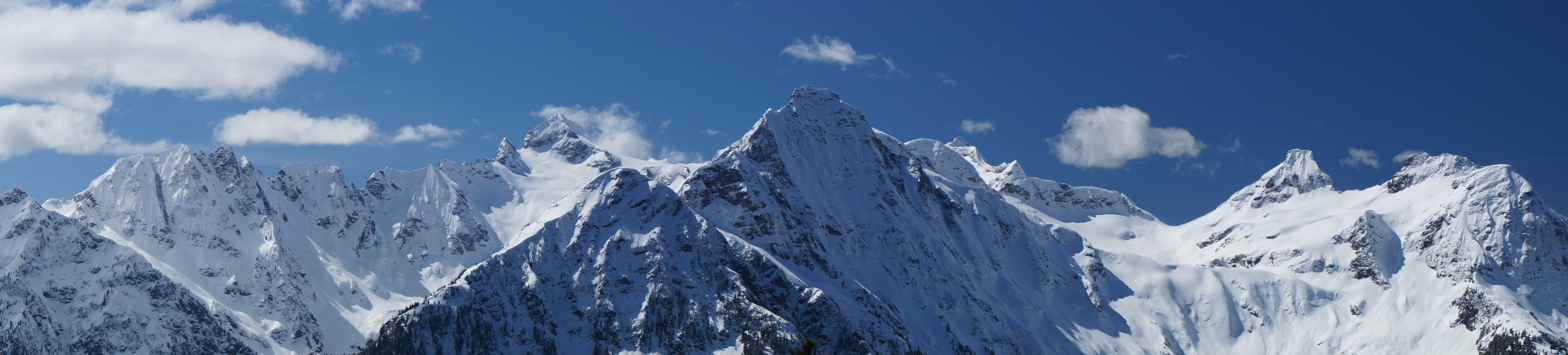
Left to right: Mantis, Snowfield, Colonial Peak, Paul Bunyans Stump, Pyramid Peak

== See also ==
- Geography of the North Cascades
- Geology of the Pacific Northwest
