= Thunder Creek =

Thunder Creek may refer to:

- Thunder Creek (1912–1938 electoral district), of the provincial legislature of Saskatchewan, Canada
- Thunder Creek (1975–2016 electoral district), of the provincial legislature of Saskatchewan, Canada
- Thunder Creek (Washington), a stream in North Cascades National Park, Washington state, US
- Thunder Creek (Saskatchewan), a river in southern Saskatchewan
