= Horsemans Pack =

Mountain in Washington (state), United States

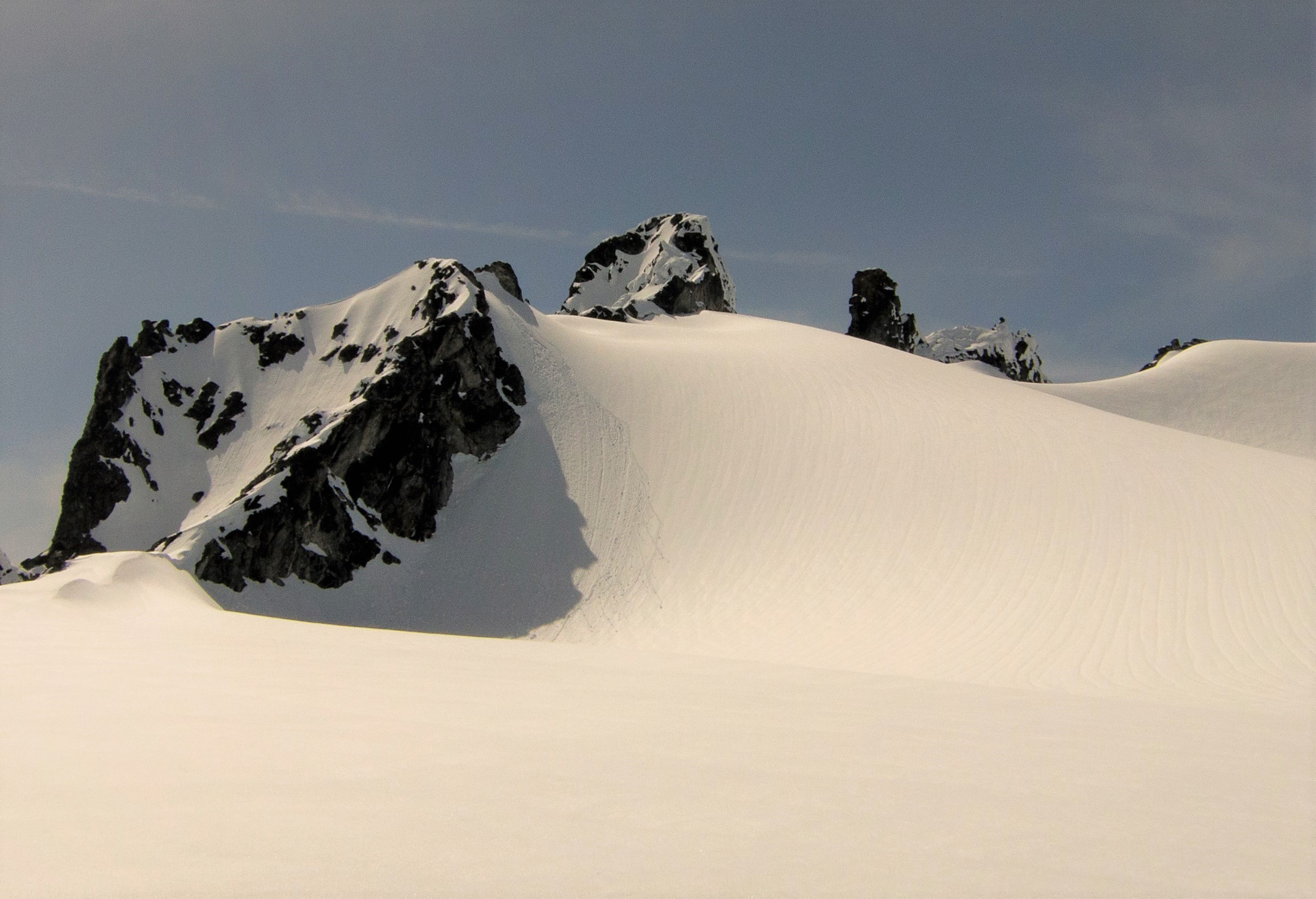
- North aspect

Highest point
- Elevation: 8,156 ft (2,486 m)
- Prominence: 472 ft (144 m)
- Coordinates: 48°38′14″N 121°09′16″W

Geography
- Location within Washington (state) Location within the United States
- Interactive map of Horsemans Pack
- Location: Skagit County, Washington, U.S.
- Parent range: Cascade Range
- Topo map: USGS Diablo Dam

Climbing
- First ascent: 1931

Horsemans Pack (8,156 feet (2,486 m)), and "The Horseman" (7,760 feet (2,370 m)), are summits located in North Cascades National Park in the U.S. state of Washington. Located in the south unit of the park, Horsemans Pack is .70 mi (1.13 km) west of Snowfield Peak and the Neve Glacier descends from the east slopes of the mountain. The first ascent of Horsemans Pack was made August 1, 1931, by William Degenhardt and Herbert Strandberg who also named this feature, whereas the first ascent of The Horseman was made July 17, 1982, by John Roper, Silas Wild, and Russ Kroeker. The Horseman's toponym has been officially adopted by the U.S. Board on Geographic Names, but Horsemans Pack has not.

== Geology ==
The North Cascades features some of the most rugged topography in the Cascade Range with craggy peaks, ridges, and deep glacial valleys. Geological events occurring many years ago created the diverse topography and drastic elevation changes over the Cascade Range leading to various climate differences.

The history of the formation of the Cascade Mountains dates back millions of years ago to the late Eocene Epoch. With the North American Plate overriding the Pacific Plate, episodes of volcanic igneous activity persisted. In addition, small fragments of the oceanic and continental lithosphere called terranes created the North Cascades about 50 million years ago. During the Pleistocene period dating back over two million years ago, glaciation advancing and retreating repeatedly scoured and shaped the landscape. Glaciation was most prevalent approximately 18,000 years ago, and most valleys were ice-free by 12,000 years ago. Uplift and faulting in combination with glaciation have been the dominant processes which have created the tall peaks and deep valleys of the North Cascades area.

Subduction and tectonic activity in the area began during the late cretaceous period, about 90 million years ago. Extensive volcanic activity began to take place in the oligocene, about 35 million years ago.

== Climate ==
Horsemans Pack is located in the marine west coast climate zone of western North America. Most weather fronts originate in the Pacific Ocean, and travel east toward the Cascade Mountains. As fronts approach the North Cascades, they are forced upward by the peaks of the Cascade Range, causing them to drop their moisture in the form of rain or snowfall onto the Cascades (Orographic lift). As a result, the west side of the North Cascades experiences high precipitation, especially during the winter months in the form of snowfall. Because of maritime influence, snow tends to be wet and heavy, resulting in high avalanche danger. During winter months, weather is usually cloudy, but due to high pressure systems over the Pacific Ocean that intensify during summer months, there is often little or no cloud cover during the summer.

== Gallery ==
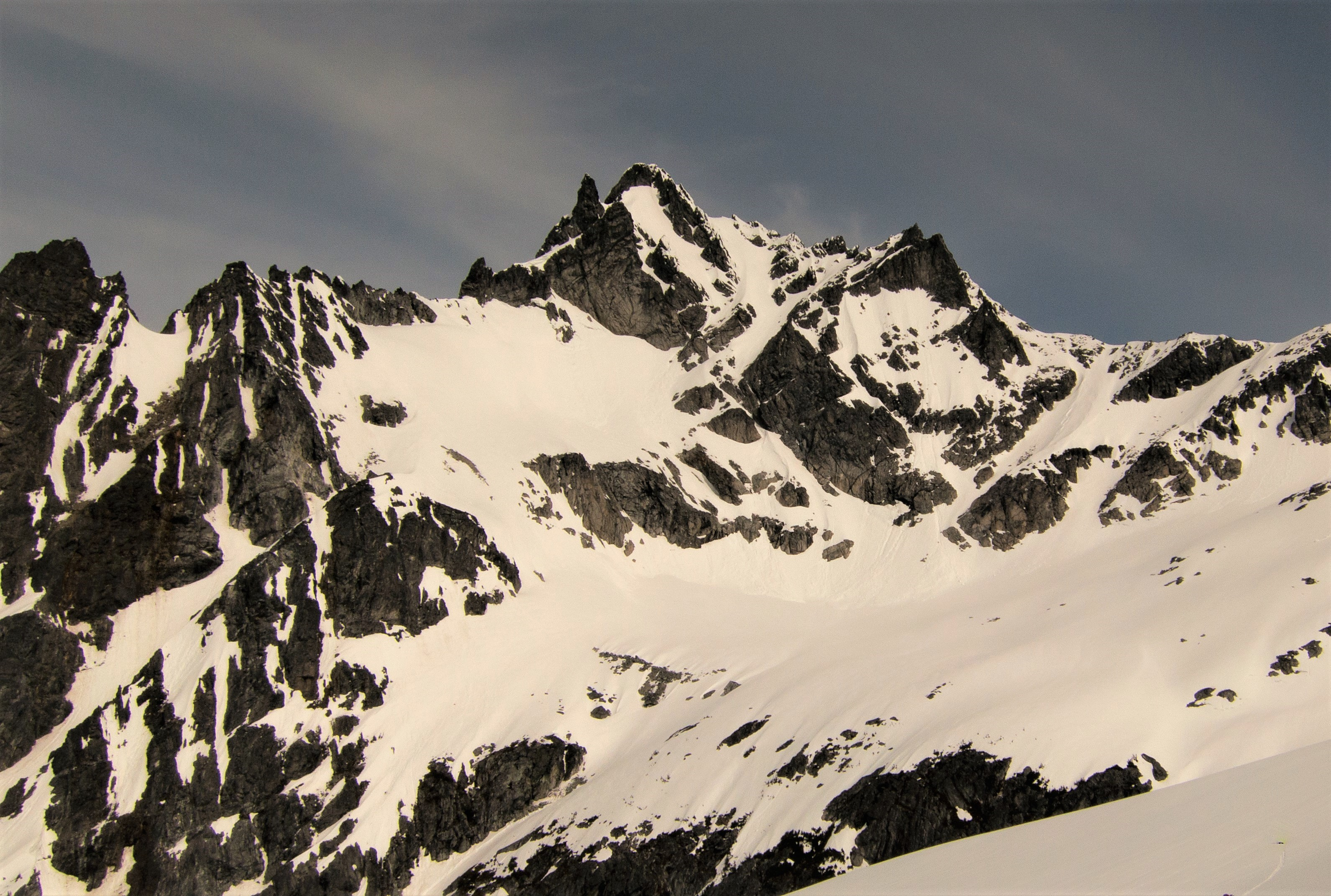
South aspect

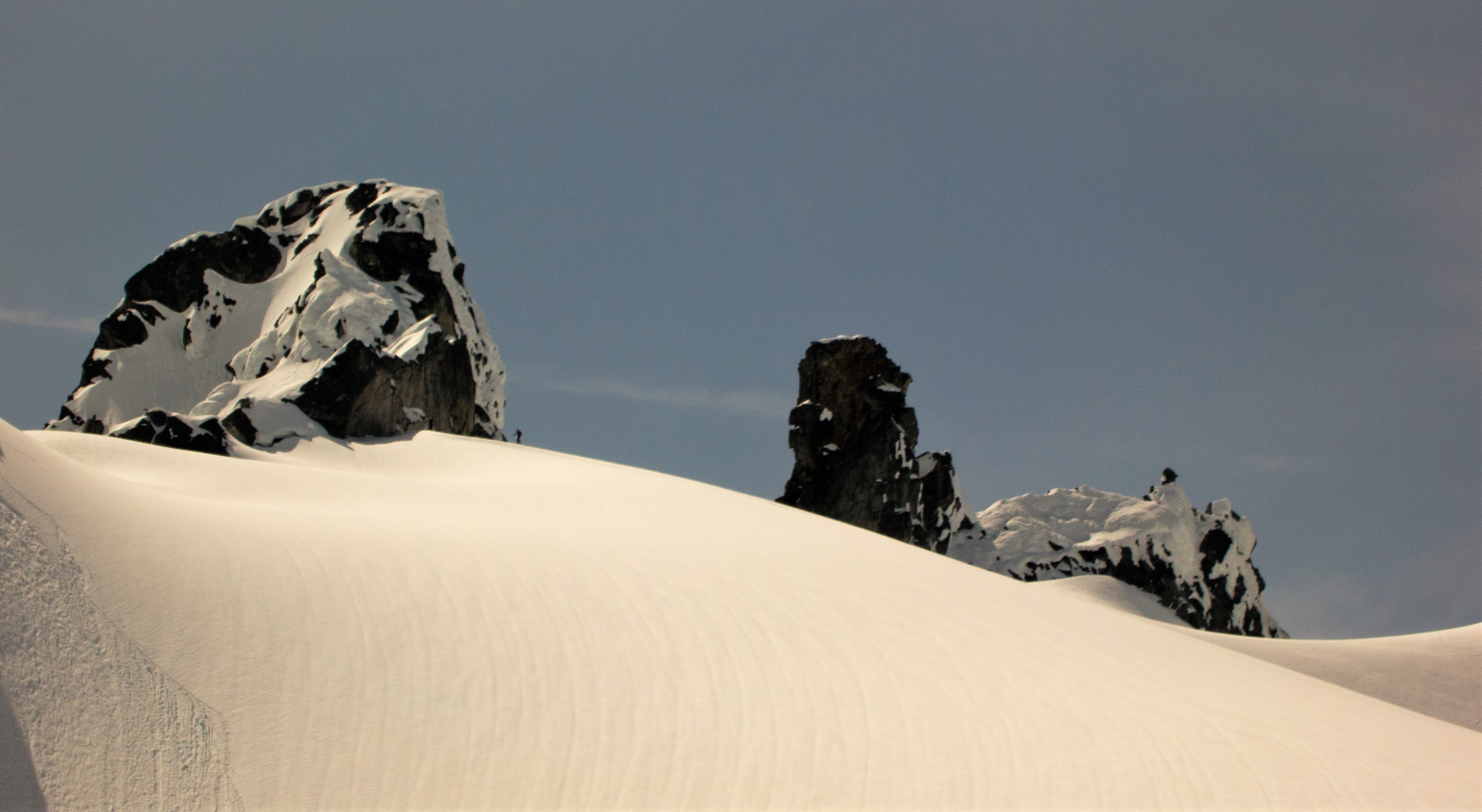
Horsemans Pack (left), The Horseman (right) from northeast

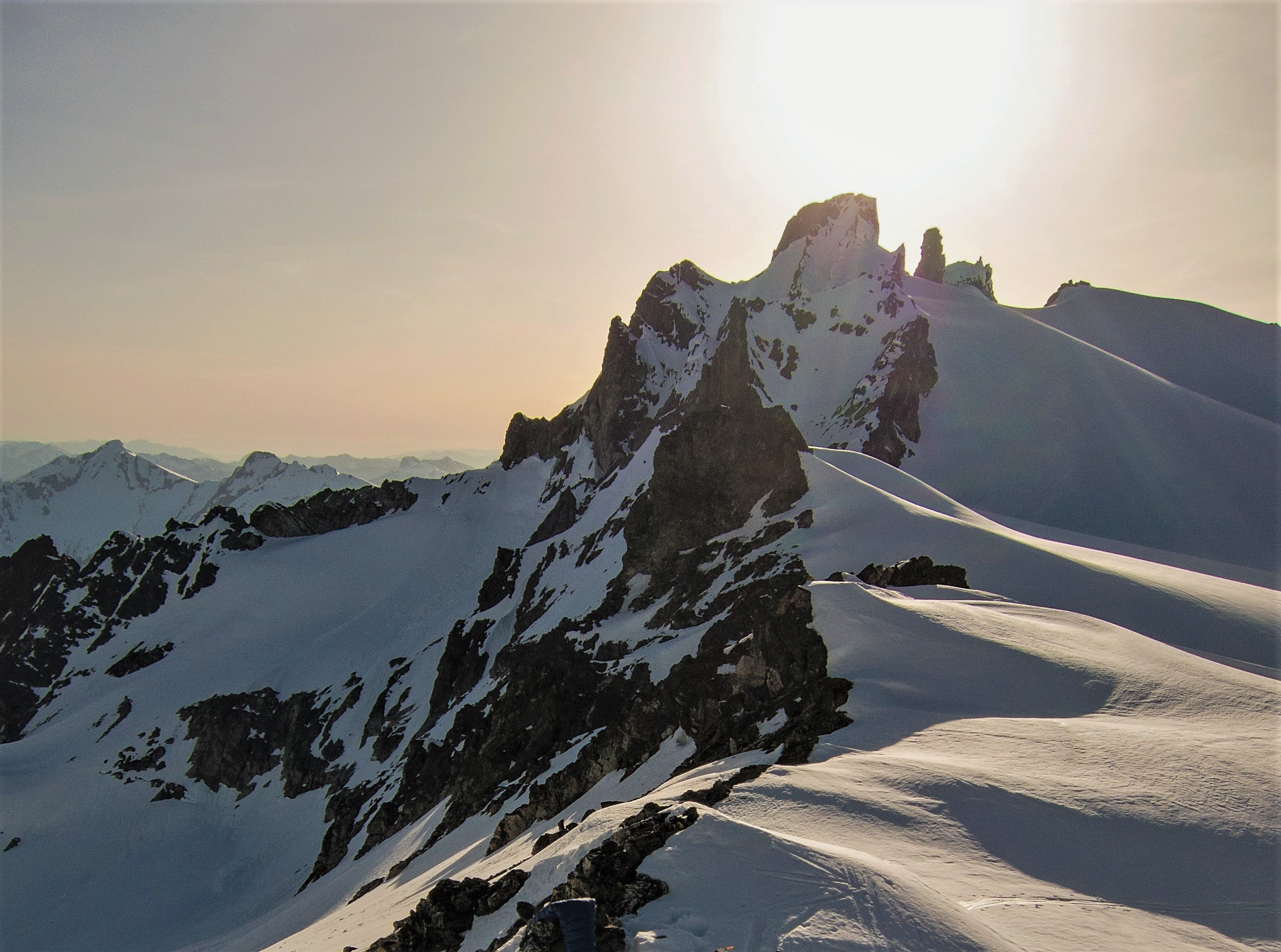
East aspect

== See also ==
- Geography of the North Cascades
