= Bread (disambiguation) =

Bread is a group of staple foods.

Bread may also refer to:

== Film and television ==
- Bread (1918 film), an American silent film
- Bread (1924 film), an American silent film
- Bread (1930 film), a Ukrainian silent film
- Bread (1971 film), a British film directed by Stanley Long
- Bread (1986 film), an Israeli Hebrew-language film
- Bread (TV series), a 1986–1991 British sitcom
- "The Bread" (King Rollo), a 1980 television episode

== Music ==
- Bread (band), an American soft rock band
  - Bread (album), by Bread, 1969
- "Bread", a song by Todd Rundgren from Hermit of Mink Hollow, 1978
- Bread, an extended play by The Alchemist, 2018

== Other uses ==
- Bread (charity), a New Zealand charitable organisation
- "The Bread", a 1947 short story by Wolfgang Borchert
- "Bread", a poem by Patti Smith from her 1978 book Babel
- "Bread", a pseudonym used by David Katz, perpetrator of the 2018 Jacksonville Landing shooting
- "Bread", a nickname commonly used for money.
