= Snowfield Peak =

Mountain in Washington (state), United States

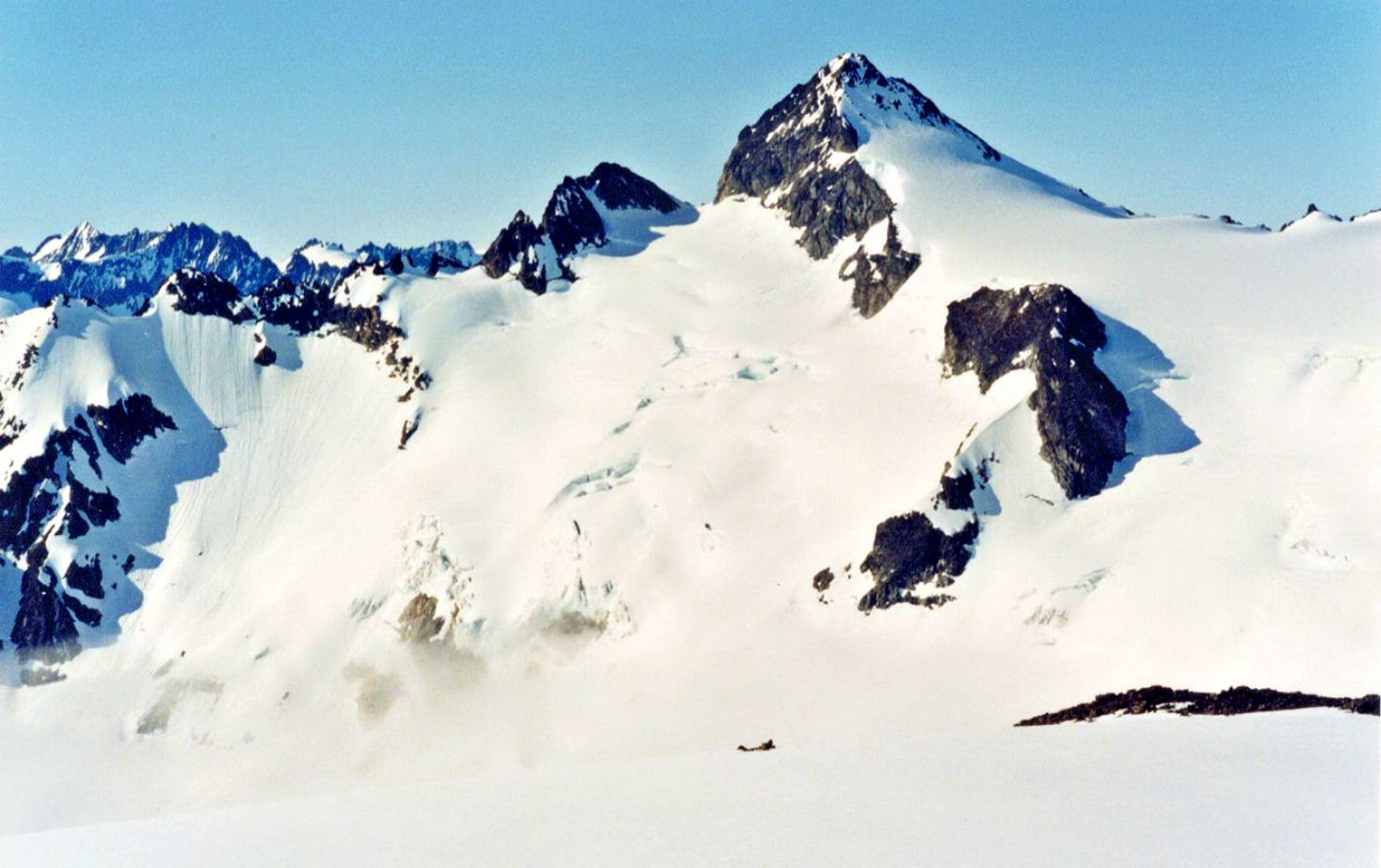
- Snowfield Peak seen from Neve Peak

Highest point
- Elevation: 8,351 ft (2,545 m)
- Prominence: 2,907 ft (886 m)
- Coordinates: 48°38′07″N 121°08′18″W

Geography
- Location within Washington (state) Location within the United States
- Location: Skagit County, Washington, U.S.
- Parent range: Cascade Range
- Topo map: USGS Diablo Dam

Snowfield Peak (8,351 feet (2,545 m)) is in North Cascades National Park in the U.S. state of Washington. Located in the south unit of the park, Snowfield Peak is .70 mi (1.13 km) east of the summit known as Horsemans Pack and the Neve Glacier descends from the north slopes of the mountain.

== Climate ==
Snowfield Peak is located in the marine west coast climate zone of western North America. Most weather fronts originate in the Pacific Ocean, and travel northeast toward the Cascade Mountains. As fronts approach the North Cascades, they are forced upward by the peaks of the Cascade Range (Orographic lift), causing them to drop their moisture in the form of rain or snowfall onto the Cascades. As a result, the west side of the North Cascades experiences high precipitation, especially during the winter months in the form of snowfall. Due to its temperate climate and proximity to the Pacific Ocean, areas west of the Cascade Crest very rarely experience temperatures below 0 °F (−18 °C) or above 80 °F (27 °C). During winter months, weather is usually cloudy, but, due to high pressure systems over the Pacific Ocean that intensify during summer months, there is often little or no cloud cover during the summer. Because of maritime influence, snow tends to be wet and heavy, resulting in high avalanche danger.

== Geology ==
The North Cascades features some of the most rugged topography in the Cascade Range with craggy peaks, ridges, and deep glacial valleys. Geological events occurring many years ago created the diverse topography and drastic elevation changes over the Cascade Range leading to the various climate differences.

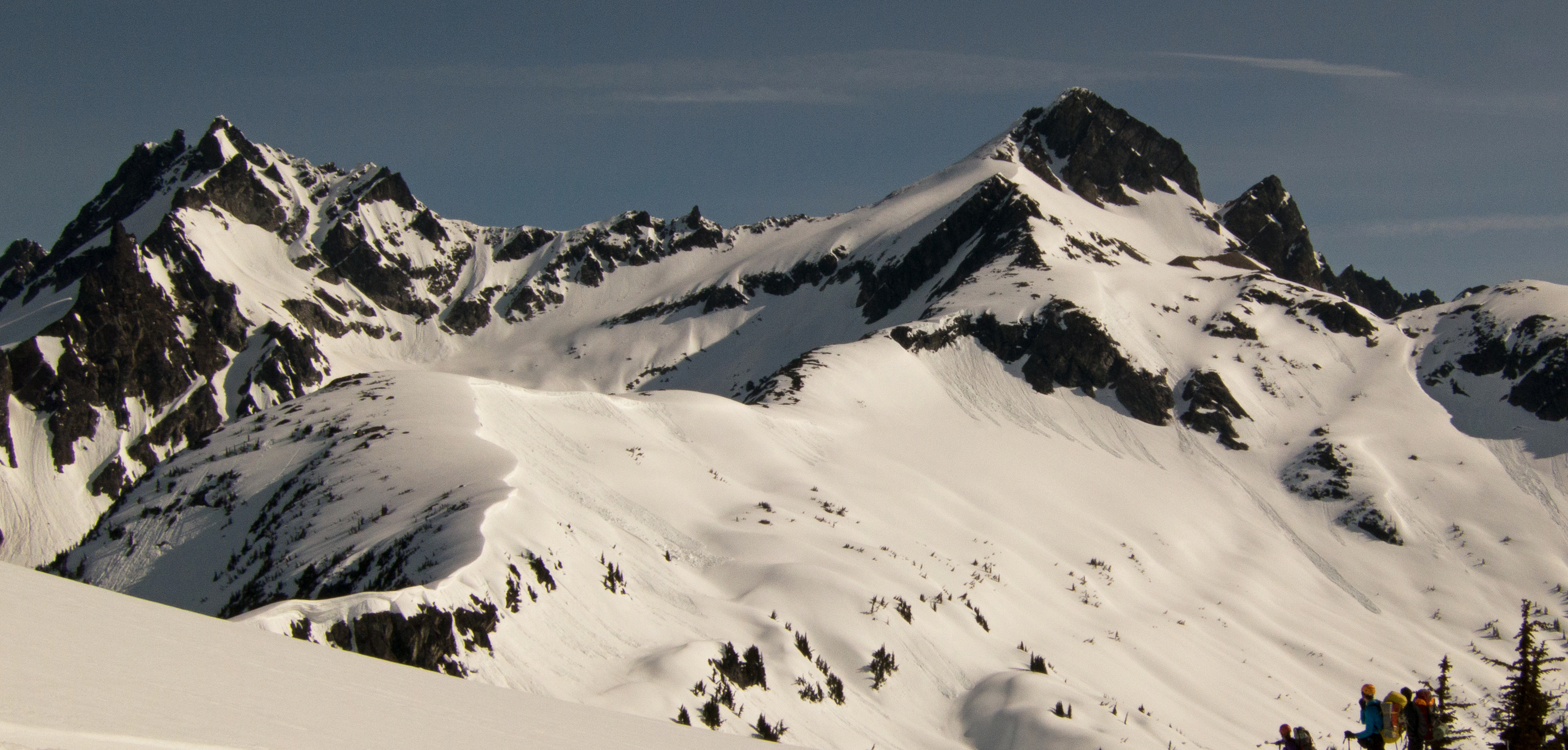
Snowfield Peak seen from the south near Isolation Peak

The history of the formation of the Cascade Mountains dates back millions of years ago to the late Eocene Epoch. With the North American Plate overriding the Pacific Plate, episodes of volcanic igneous activity persisted. In addition, small fragments of the oceanic and continental lithosphere called terranes created the North Cascades about 50 million years ago.

During the Pleistocene period dating back over two million years ago, glaciation advancing and retreating repeatedly scoured the landscape leaving deposits of rock debris. The U-shaped cross section of the river valleys is a result of recent glaciation. Uplift and faulting in combination with glaciation have been the dominant processes which have created the tall peaks and deep valleys of the North Cascades area.

== Gallery ==
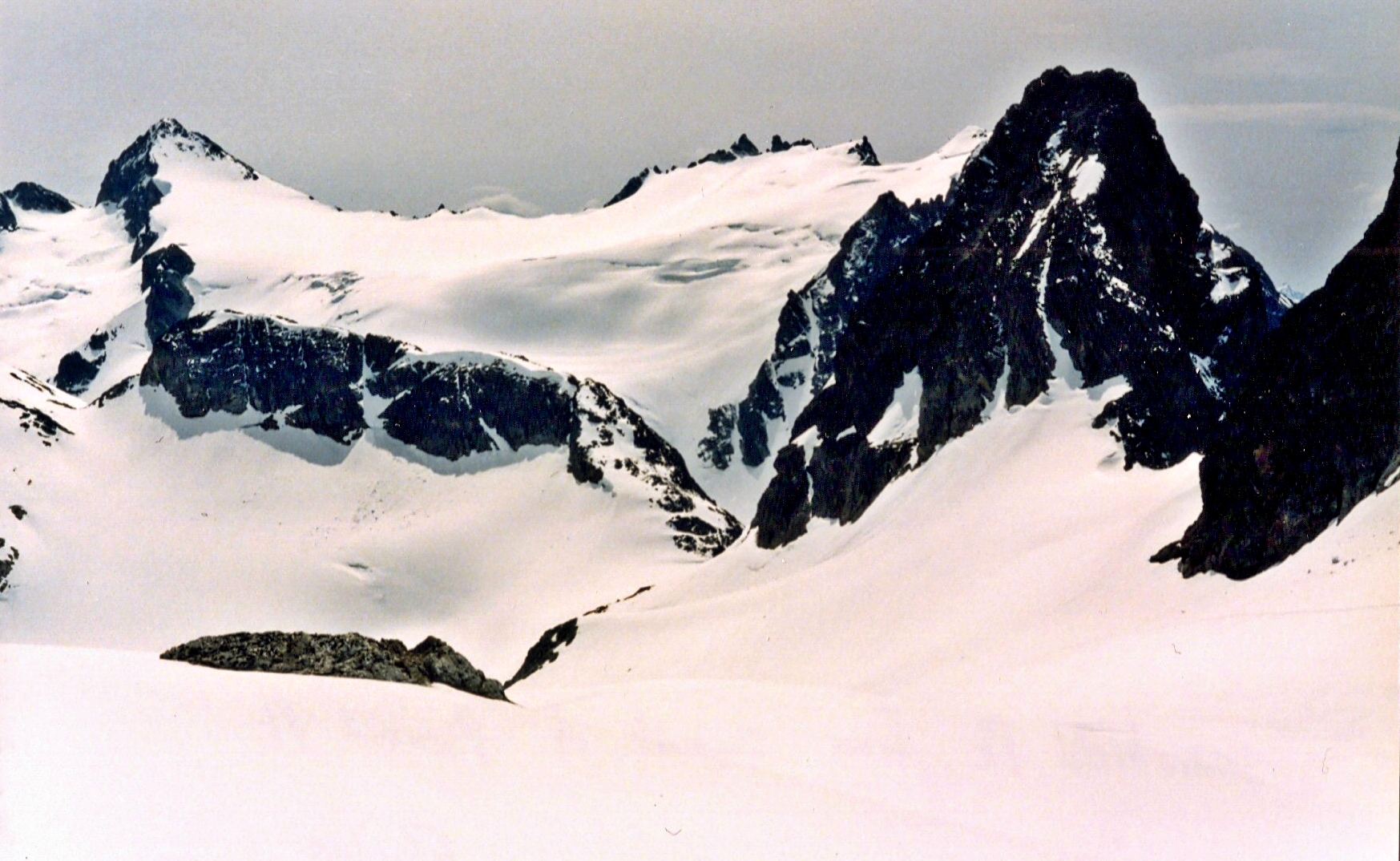
Snowfield Peak, The Horseman, Paul Bunyans Stump

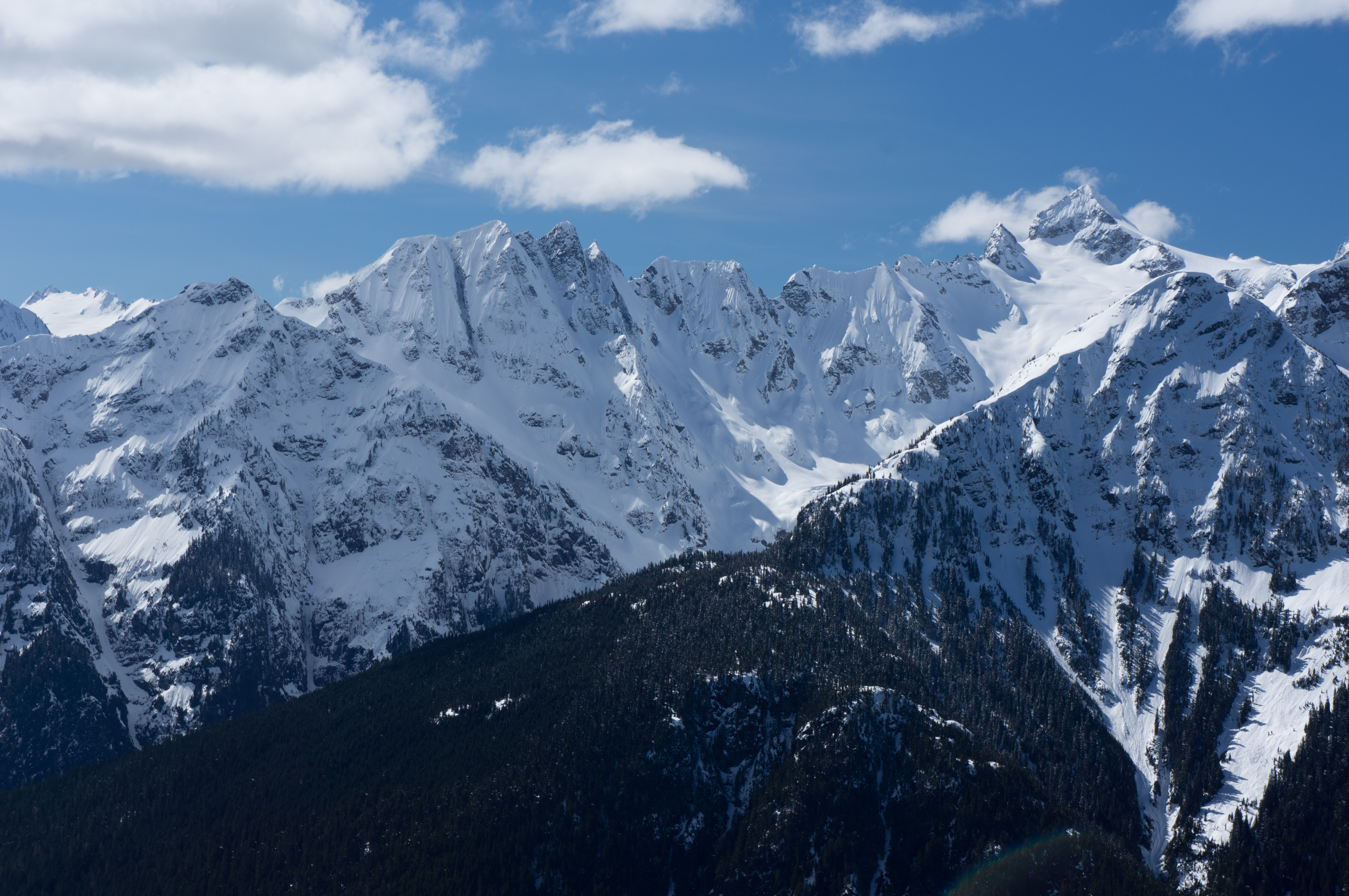
Snowfield Peak (right), with Distal Phalanx, Mantis Peak, and Styloid Peak
