= Ladder Creek Glacier =

Glacier in the state of Washington

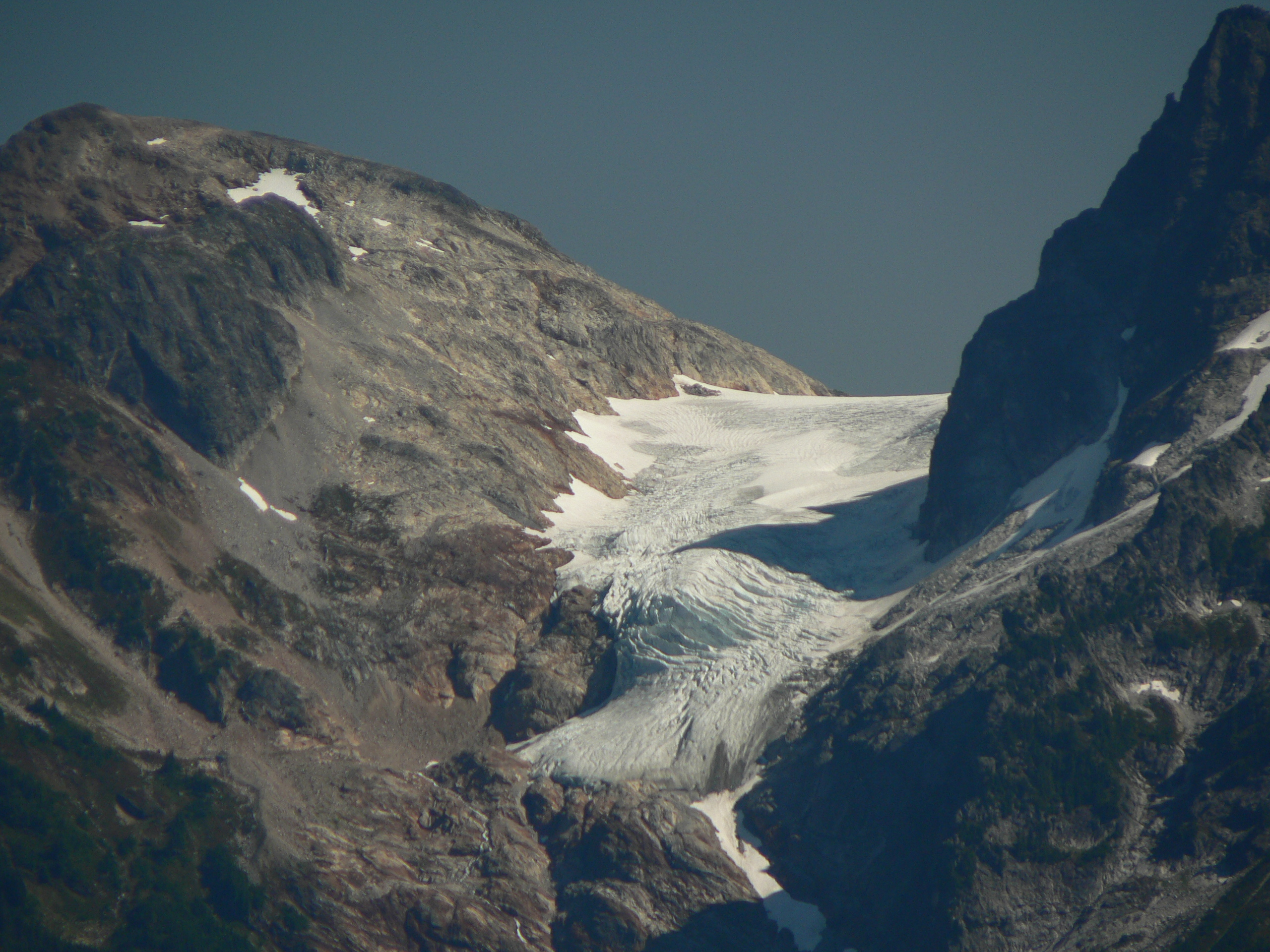
- Ladder Creek Glacier

- Location within Washington (state)
- Type: Mountain glacier
- Location: Whatcom County, Washington, U.S.
- Coordinates: 48°38′46″N 121°08′28″W
- Length: .85 mi (1.37 km)
- Terminus: Icefall
- Status: Retreating

Ladder Creek Glacier is in North Cascades National Park in the U.S. state of Washington and is a northwest tongue of the larger Neve Glacier. Ladder Creek Glacier added 105 m (344 ft) between 1950 and 1979, but lost 190 m (620 ft) from 1979 to 2006. Ladder Creek Glacier descends from 7,800 to 6,000 ft (2,400 to 1,800 m).

== See also ==
- List of glaciers in the United States
