= Neve Glacier =

Glacier in Washington state, United States

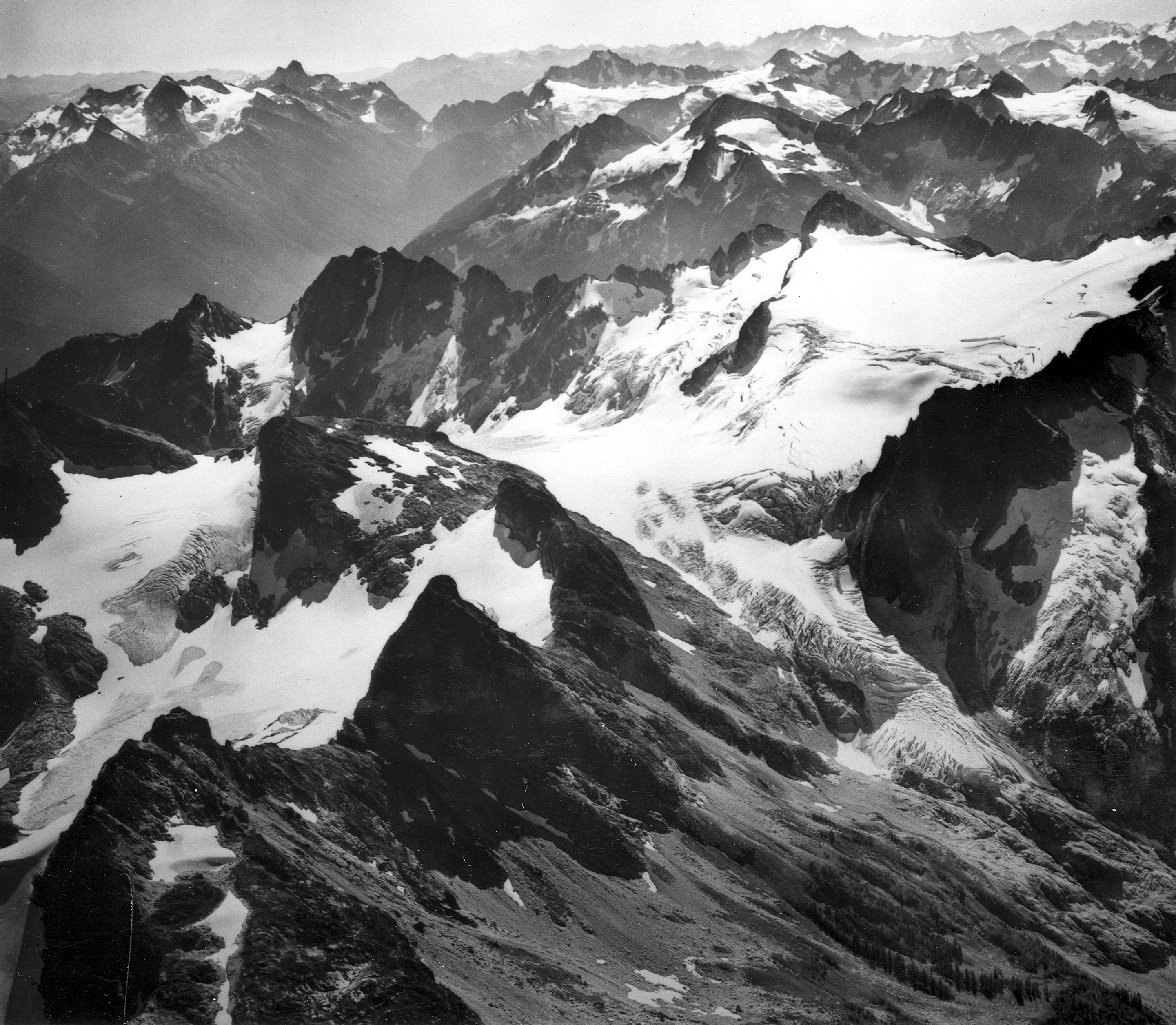
- View of Neve Glacier at right from the northeast as seen in 1971. The smaller Colonial Glacier is at left.

- Location within Washington (state)
- Type: Alpine glacier
- Location: Skagit and Whatcom County, Washington, U.S.
- Coordinates: 48°38′46″N 121°08′28″W
- Length: 1.80 mi (2.90 km)
- Terminus: Barren rock
- Status: Retreating

Neve Glacier is in North Cascades National Park in the U.S. state of Washington and is on the north slopes of Snowfield Peak. Neve Glacier flows generally north and splits in two with two terminal tongues, one flowing to the northwest which is known as Ladder Creek Glacier and the other descending a total of more than 1.8 mi (2.9 km) to the east. Ladder Creek Glacier descends from 7,800 to 6,000 ft (2,400 to 1,800 m), while the east tongue also originates from the same altitude and descends to 5,600 ft (1,700 m). Between 1850 and 2006, Neve Glacier is estimated to have retreated more than 1,000 m (3,300 ft).

== See also ==
- List of glaciers in the United States

== Gallery ==
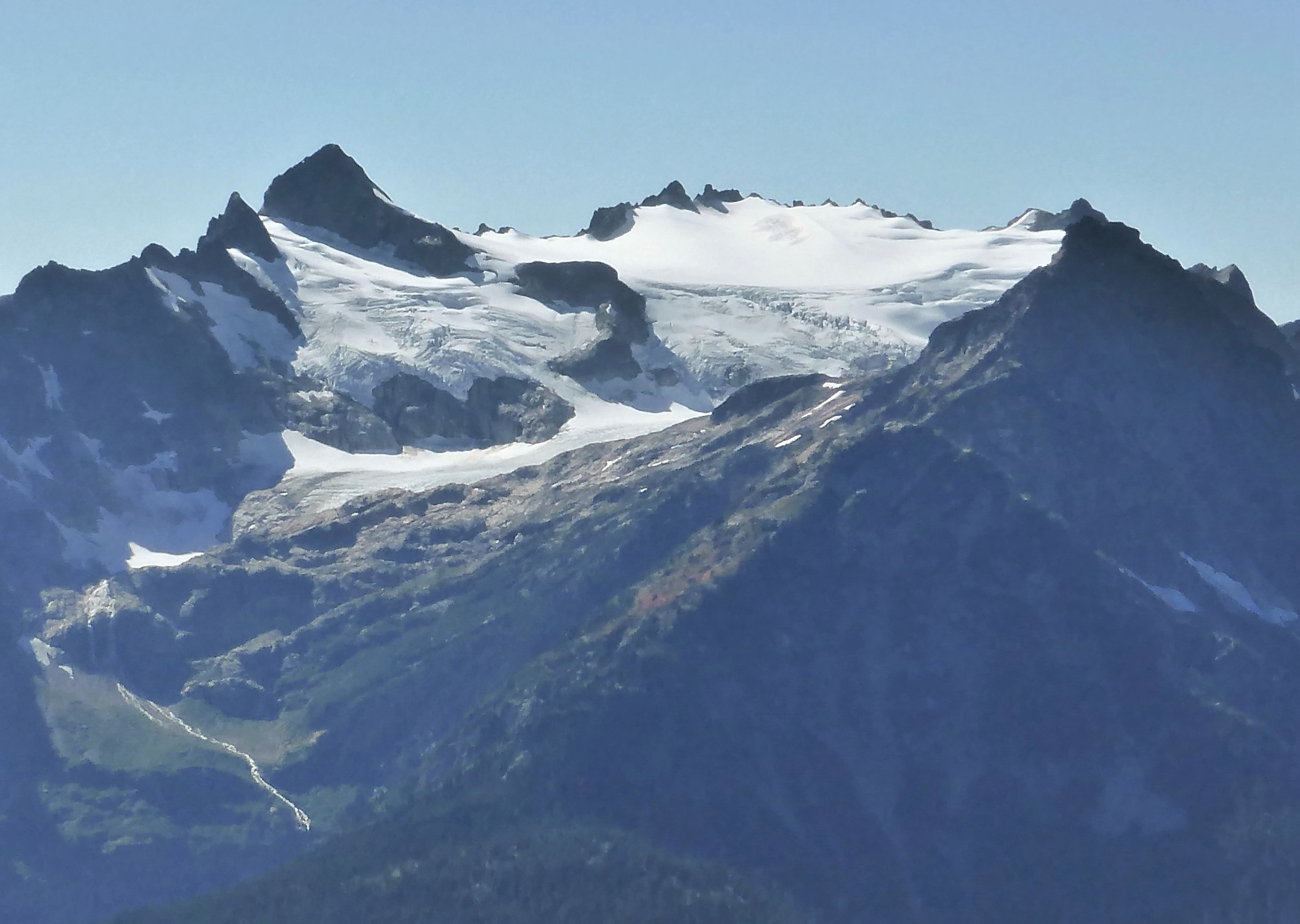
Neve Glacier and Snowfield Peak (left) seen from Ruby Mountain

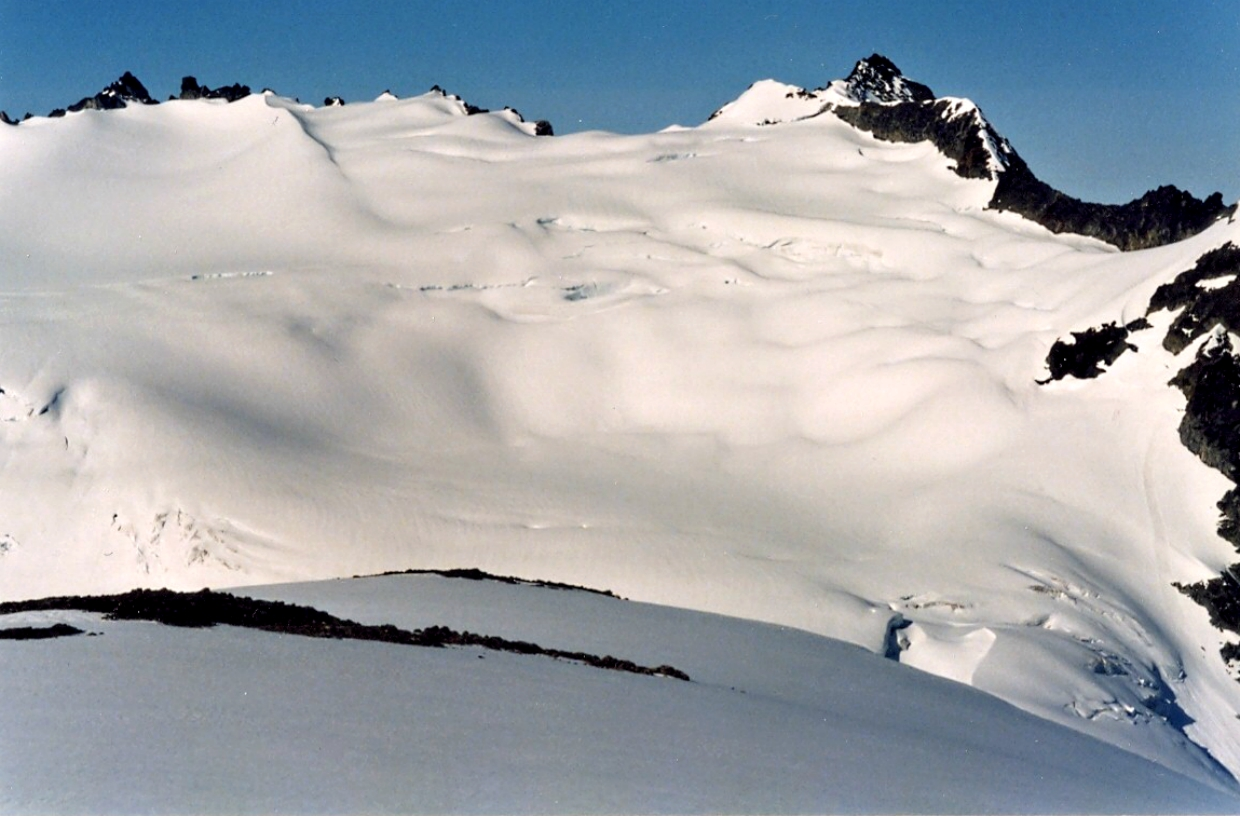
Neve Glacier seen from Neve Peak
