= Bread Charity =

Charity in New Zealand

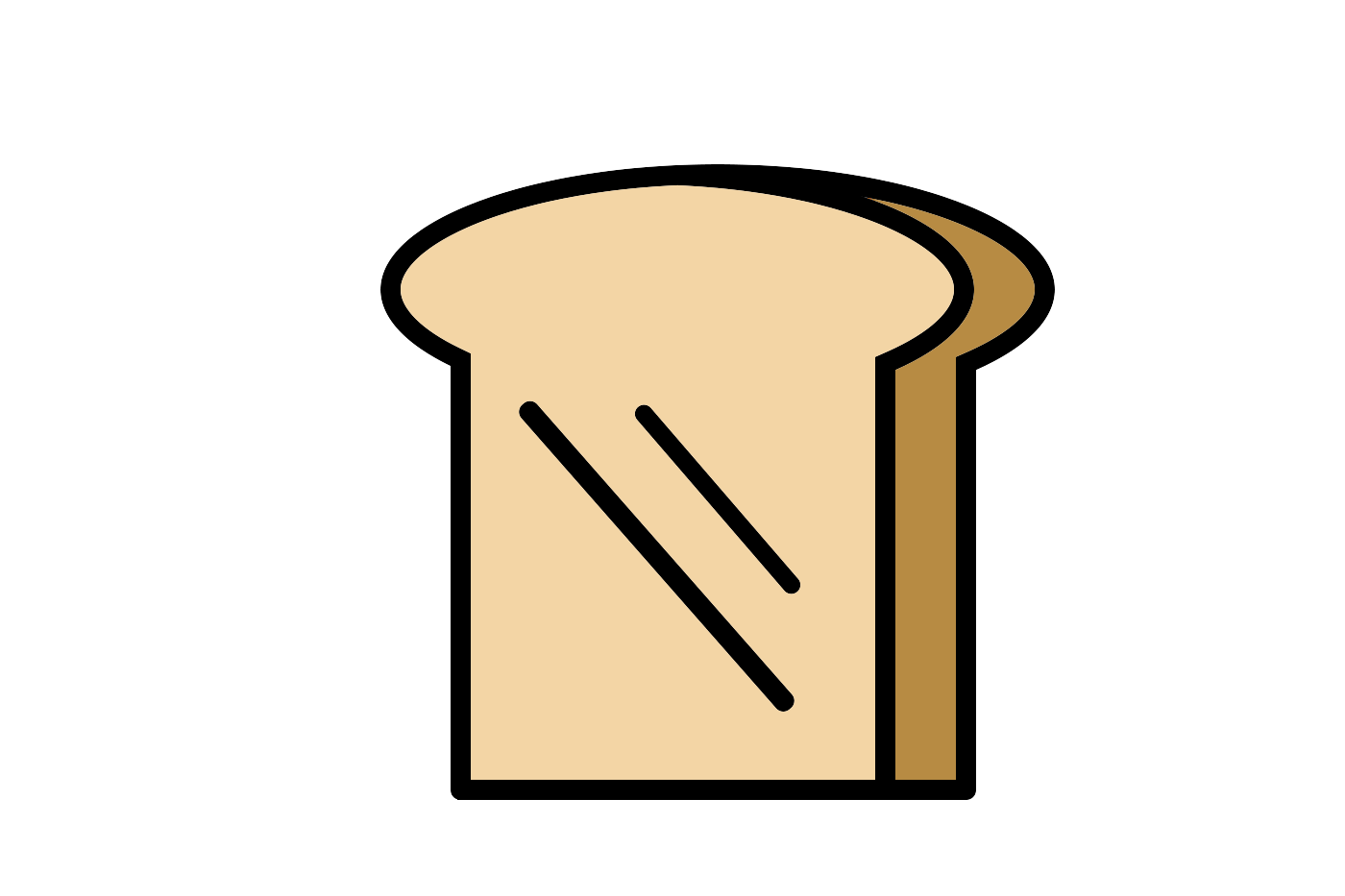
- Founded: 2017; 9 years ago
- Founder: Mustafa Sheikh
- Legal status: Non-profit organization
- Purpose: Child Poverty
- Region served: New Zealand, Los Angeles
- Website: www.bread.org.nz

Bread Charity is a charitable organisation established in New Zealand in 2017. Its goal is to assist students with career guidance, goal setting and creating a positive mindset. The name "Bread" was chosen to represent the qualities "Brave, Eager and Determined".

== Establishment ==
The charity was founded by Mustafa Sheikh, also known by his stage name Lil Mussie, a New Zealand entrepreneur, hip hop recording artist and philanthropist from Auckland. Sheikh grew up in Gisborne where he attended Gisborne Boys' High School. He graduated from the University of Auckland with an honours degree in chemistry. Sheikh started the charity as a response to the difficulties of low-income families in his home region that he observed while growing up there.

== Mission ==
Bread's primary objective is to assist children living in poverty. On a weekly basis, a team of University of Auckland medical students volunteer mentoring children from low decile intermediate schools. The sessions consist of activities such as goal-setting, university research and career pathway advice. The volunteers stay with the students for six months each. According to Sheikh, "we want to show these students they are capable of anything regardless of where they come from".

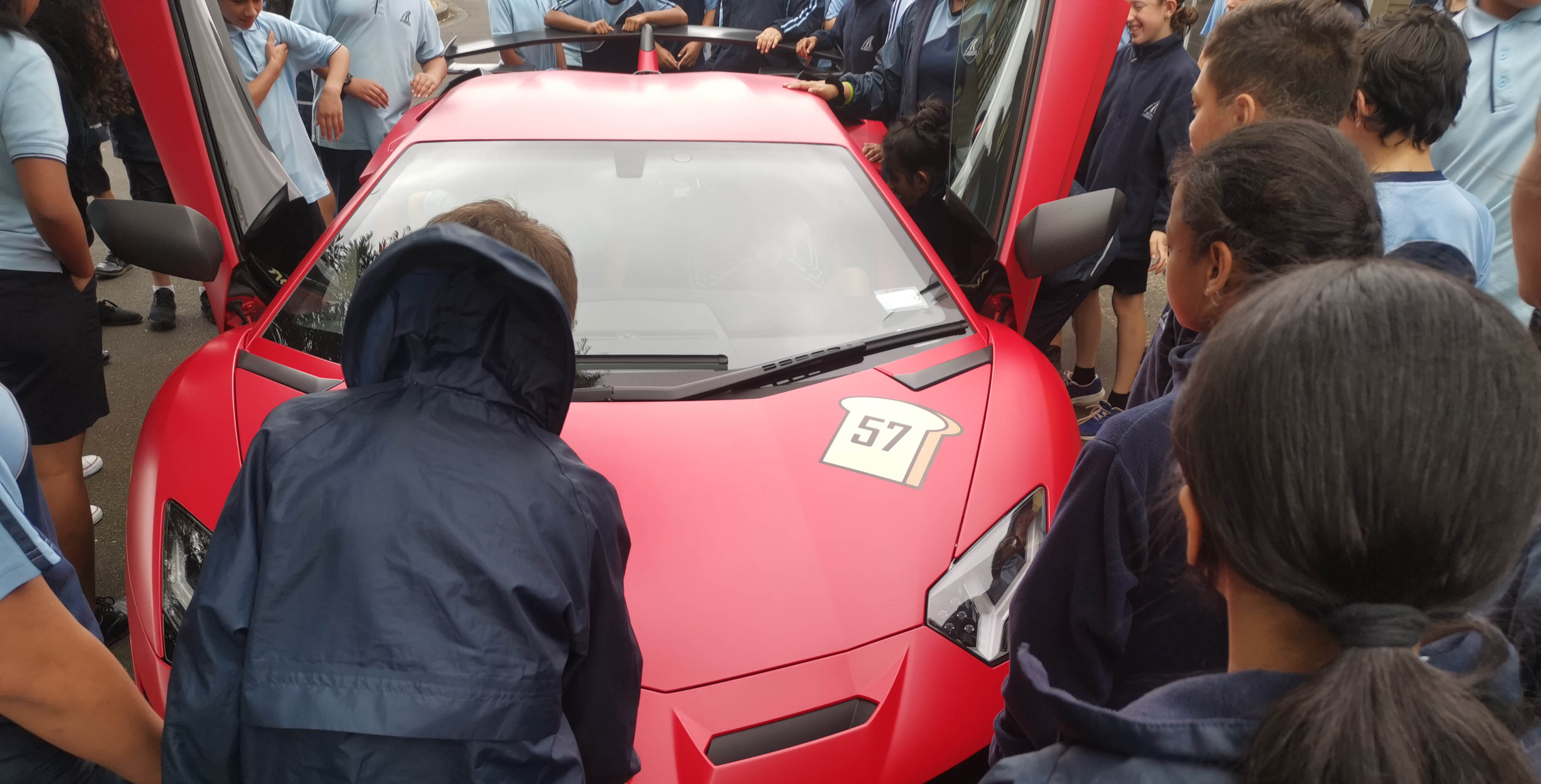
Students looking at a Lamborghini Aventador SVJ

By 2021 Bread aims to have completed development of a youth centre in Auckland.

== Fundraising events ==
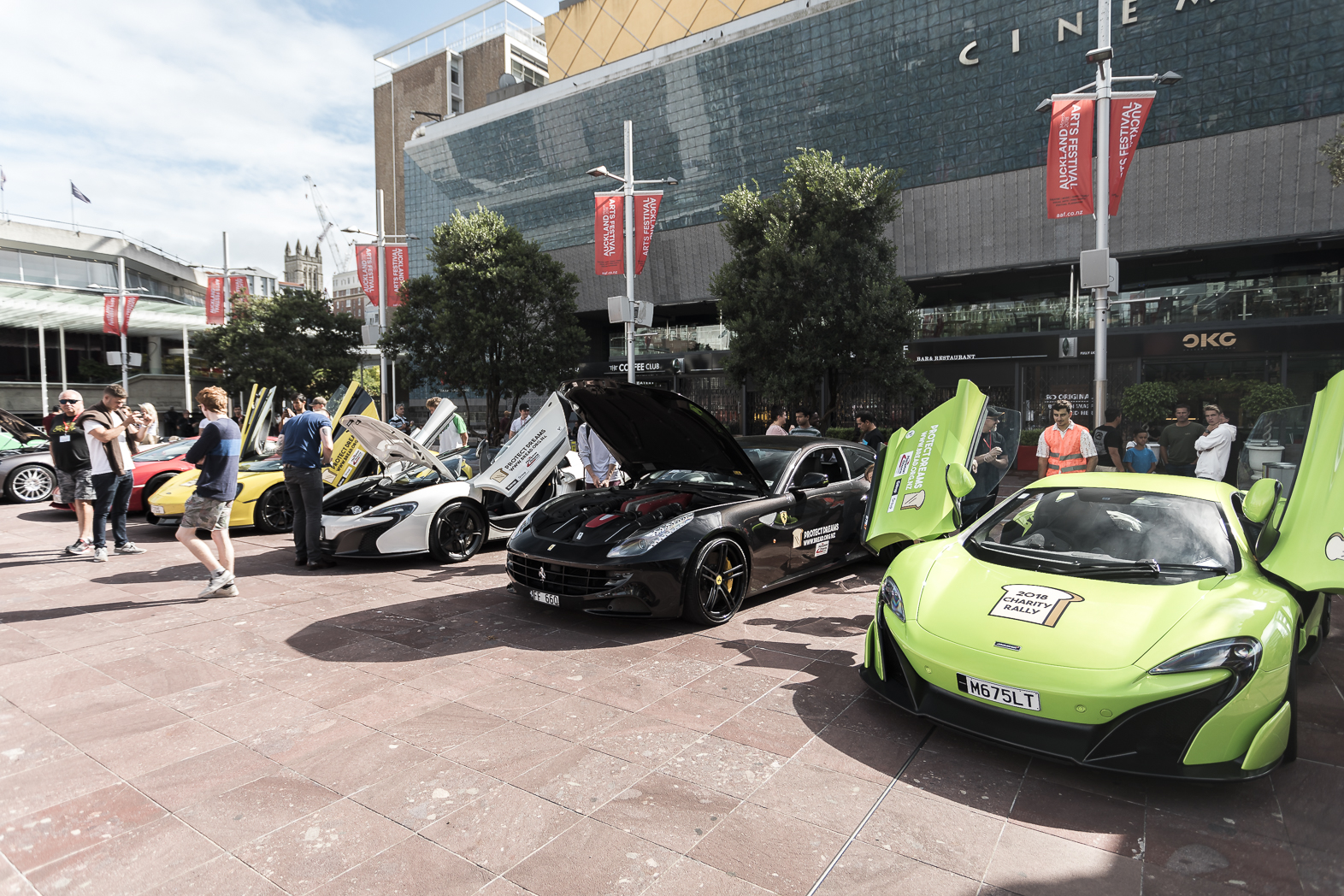
Bread 2018 Charity Rally, Auckland New Zealand.

Bread hosts a variety of annual motorsport activities to raise funds. The events are limited to supercars which include manufacturers such as Ferrari, Lamborghini, McLaren and Porsche. Bread hosts supercar track days at Hampton Downs Motorsport Park as well as a supercar rally. At the supercar rally, more than 30 supercars participate in a parade down Queen Street, Auckland.

Occasionally Bread also takes supercars to show children. This has included a $1,000,000 Lamborghini Aventador SVJ.

During the national lockdown due to the COVID-19 pandemic in 2020, Sheikh, under the rap alias Lil Mussie, competed against UFC fighter Shane Young in a $1000 Call of Duty challenge. Lil Mussie, having lost, donated $1000 to a family living in Gisborne.

Lil Mussie released a single titled How About You? which gained 250,000 streams in the first month. The track was aimed at generating awareness for the charity through music with the song focusing on the founding of the charity and the hardships endured.

In August 2020 Lil Mussie worked with Kanye West's team on his single 'On Me'. The single features American rapper King Chip (also known as Chip Tha Ripper).The engineering of the song was done by 4 time Grammy winner Anthony Kilhoffer. The song aims at being an inspiration for children with themes of ambition and drive.

In 2021, Sheikh moved to Los Angeles and aims to run programmes to help impoverished children in the city.

=== Children's Book Initiative ===
In collaboration with Ferrari's Chief Design Officer, Flavio Manzoni, Mussie Sheikh authored *The Boy Who Wasn't Scared to Dream*. This children's book, inspired by Sheikh’s personal mission to encourage children to face challenges with courage, was made possible with artistic contributions from Manzoni and support from Ferrari, highlighting the charity's commitment to creativity and empowerment.

== Bread Studios ==
In 2021 Bread launched Bread Studios. Five free musical recording facilities aimed at assisting kids from low socio-economic areas. These feature musical instruments, vocal recording and production equipment for the children to use free of charge.

In August 2021 the USA division built a 1,000 ft^{2} musical studio for children in Watts, Los Angeles.
