= Sourdough Mountain Lookout =

- U.S. National Register of Historic Places
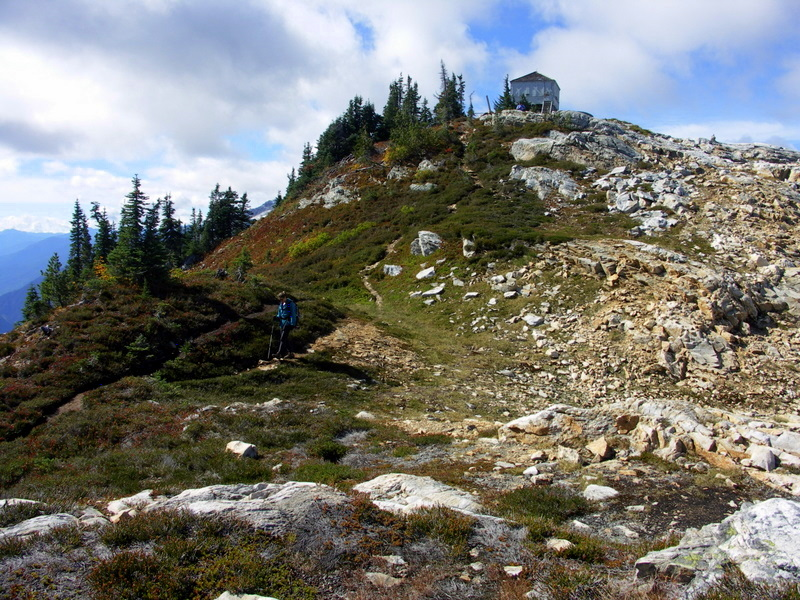
- Sourdough Mountain Lookout

- Location within Washington (state)
- Nearest city: Newhalem, Washington
- Coordinates: 48°44′33″N 121°6′33″W
- Area: less than one acre
- Built: 1933
- MPS: North Cascades National Park Service Complex MRA
- NRHP reference No.: 88003449
- Added to NRHP: February 10, 1989

The Sourdough Mountain Lookout is a fire lookout that was built by the Civilian Conservation Corps in 1933. Constructed atop Sourdough Mountain in North Cascades National Park, in the U.S. state of Washington, the lookout was placed on the National Register of Historic Places in 1989.

An earlier lookout was erected at the site in 1917 but was torn down when the current lookout was constructed. The current structure was built atop a rock foundation and is 14.25 ft (4.34 m) by 14.25 ft (4.34 m) square. The walls are composed of shiplap siding and the structure is covered with a wood-shingled hip roof. Diagonally-braced plywood shutters could be swung open for observation in each direction. The structure is no longer used on a regular basis but is visited with some frequency by hikers and it is a 5 mi (8.0 km) hike to the cabin from the trailhead.

During the summer of 1953, poet Gary Snyder worked at the location as a fire lookout while his friend and fellow poet Philip Whalen worked at Sauk Mountain Lookout. Snyder's poem "Mid-August at Sourdough Mountain Lookout" is based on his time there as is his poem "August on Sourdough, A Visit from Dick Brewer." Snyder's time at Sourdough Mountain Lookout is said to have provided the "seed experience for the poetry he is best known for: language full of the raw, playful wit that reflects the granite ridges where he worked and watched and wrote."

Two years later Snyder was blacklisted by the Forest Service from working another season at Sourdough Mountain so Whalen took his place as the lookout. While there Whalen wrote "Sourdough Mountain Lookout," one of his "most enduring poems." The poem references Whalen's work as a lookout along with "musings on rocks, insects, animals, and weather."

In August 2023, the lookout was wrapped in fire-proof material to mitigate potential damage caused by the nearby Sourdough Fire.
