= Sourdough Draw =

Valley in Custer County, South Dakota, United States

Coordinates: 43°46′33″N 103°47′54″W

Sourdough Draw is a valley in the U.S. state of South Dakota.

Sourdough Draw was named for the sourdough bread which was a food staple of local prospectors.
