= Ruby Mountain (Washington) =

Mountain in Washington (state), United States

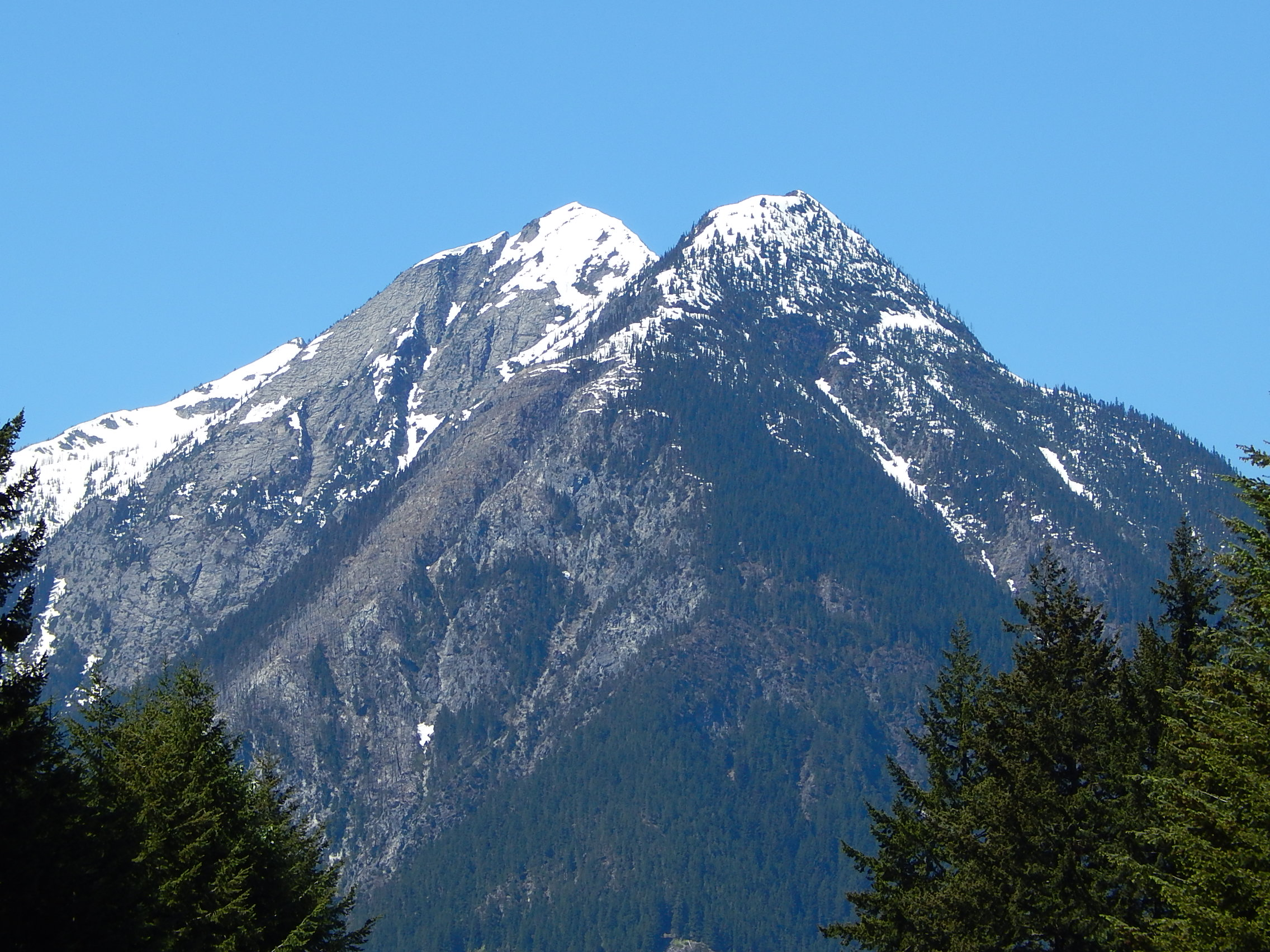
- Ruby Mountain, east aspect

Highest point
- Elevation: 7,412 ft (2,259 m) NAVD 88
- Prominence: 3,888 ft (1,185 m)
- Parent peak: Red Mountain (7,658 ft)
- Isolation: 4.24 mi (6.82 km)
- Coordinates: 48°41′40″N 121°02′34″W

Geography
- Location within Washington (state)
- Interactive map of Ruby Mountain
- Country: United States
- State: Washington
- County: Whatcom
- Parent range: North Cascades
- Topo map: USGS Ross Dam

Geology
- Rock age: Eocene to Late Cretaceous
- Rock type: Schist

Climbing
- First ascent: 1916 Tommy Thompson
- Easiest route: Scrambling

Ruby Mountain is a prominent 7,412-foot (2,259-metre) mountain summit located in the North Cascades Range of Washington state. It is situated in Ross Lake National Recreation Area which is part of the North Cascades National Park Complex. The Diablo Lake Overlook along the North Cascades Highway is at the foot of the mountain. The nearest higher peak is Colonial Peak, 4.2 miles (6.8 km) to the southwest. Precipitation runoff on the east side of the mountain drains to Ross Lake via Ruby Creek, whereas the west side of the mountain drains to Diablo Lake via Thunder Creek. Topographic relief is significant as the summit rises 6,200 feet (1,900 meters) above Diablo Lake in approximately two miles.

== History ==
Ruby Mountain is named in association with Ruby Creek. The mountain rises above the confluence of Ruby Creek and Skagit River. Local tradition holds that in 1872, settlers John Sutter, George Sanger, and John Rowley travelled up the Skagit River and reached Ruby Creek. Sutter found a ruby on the creek, thereby giving it its name.

The first ascent of the summit was made by forest ranger Tommy Thompson in 1916.

== Climate ==
Ruby Mountain is located in the marine west coast climate zone of western North America. Weather fronts originating in the Pacific Ocean travel northeast toward the Cascade Mountains. As fronts approach the North Cascades, they are forced upward by the peaks of the Cascade Range (orographic lift), causing them to drop their moisture in the form of rain or snowfall onto the Cascades. As a result, the west side of the North Cascades experiences high precipitation, especially during the winter months in the form of snowfall. Because of maritime influence, snow tends to be wet and heavy, resulting in high avalanche danger. During winter months, weather is usually cloudy, but due to high pressure systems over the Pacific Ocean that intensify during summer months, there is often little or no cloud cover during the summer. Due to its temperate climate and proximity to the Pacific Ocean, areas west of the Cascade Crest very rarely experience temperatures below 0 °F (−18 °C) or above 80 °F (27 °C).

== Geology ==
The North Cascades features some of the most rugged topography in the Cascade Range with craggy peaks, ridges, and deep glacial valleys. Geological events occurring many years ago created the diverse topography and drastic elevation changes over the Cascade Range leading to the various climate differences. These climate differences lead to vegetation variety defining the ecoregions in this area.

The history of the formation of the Cascade Mountains dates back millions of years ago to the late Eocene Epoch. With the North American Plate overriding the Pacific Plate, episodes of volcanic igneous activity persisted. In addition, small fragments of the oceanic and continental lithosphere called terranes created the North Cascades about 50 million years ago.

During the Pleistocene period dating back over two million years ago, glaciation advancing and retreating repeatedly scoured the landscape leaving deposits of rock debris. The U-shaped cross section of the river valleys is a result of recent glaciation. Uplift and faulting in combination with glaciation have been the dominant processes which have created the tall peaks and deep valleys of the North Cascades area.

== Gallery ==
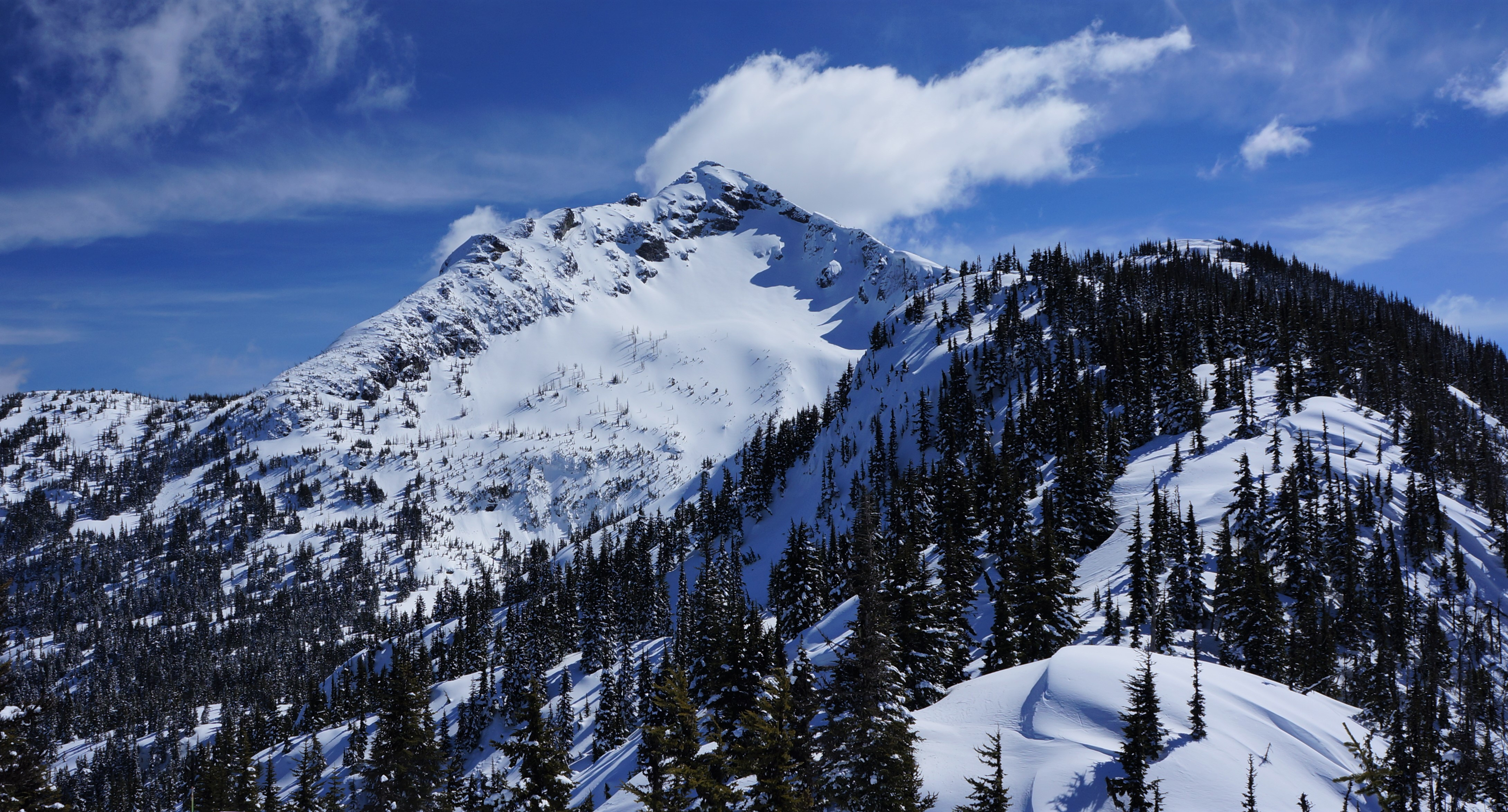

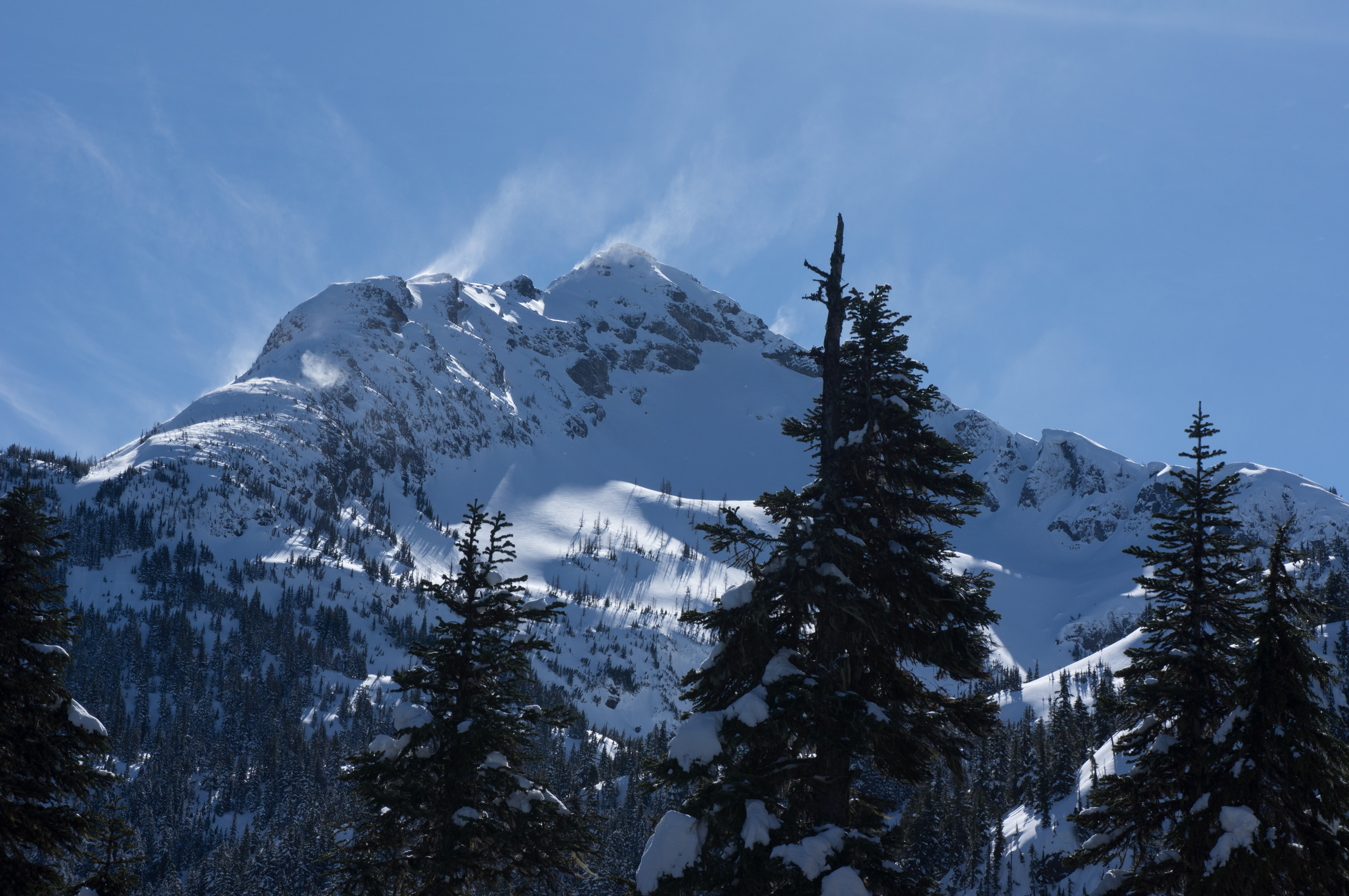

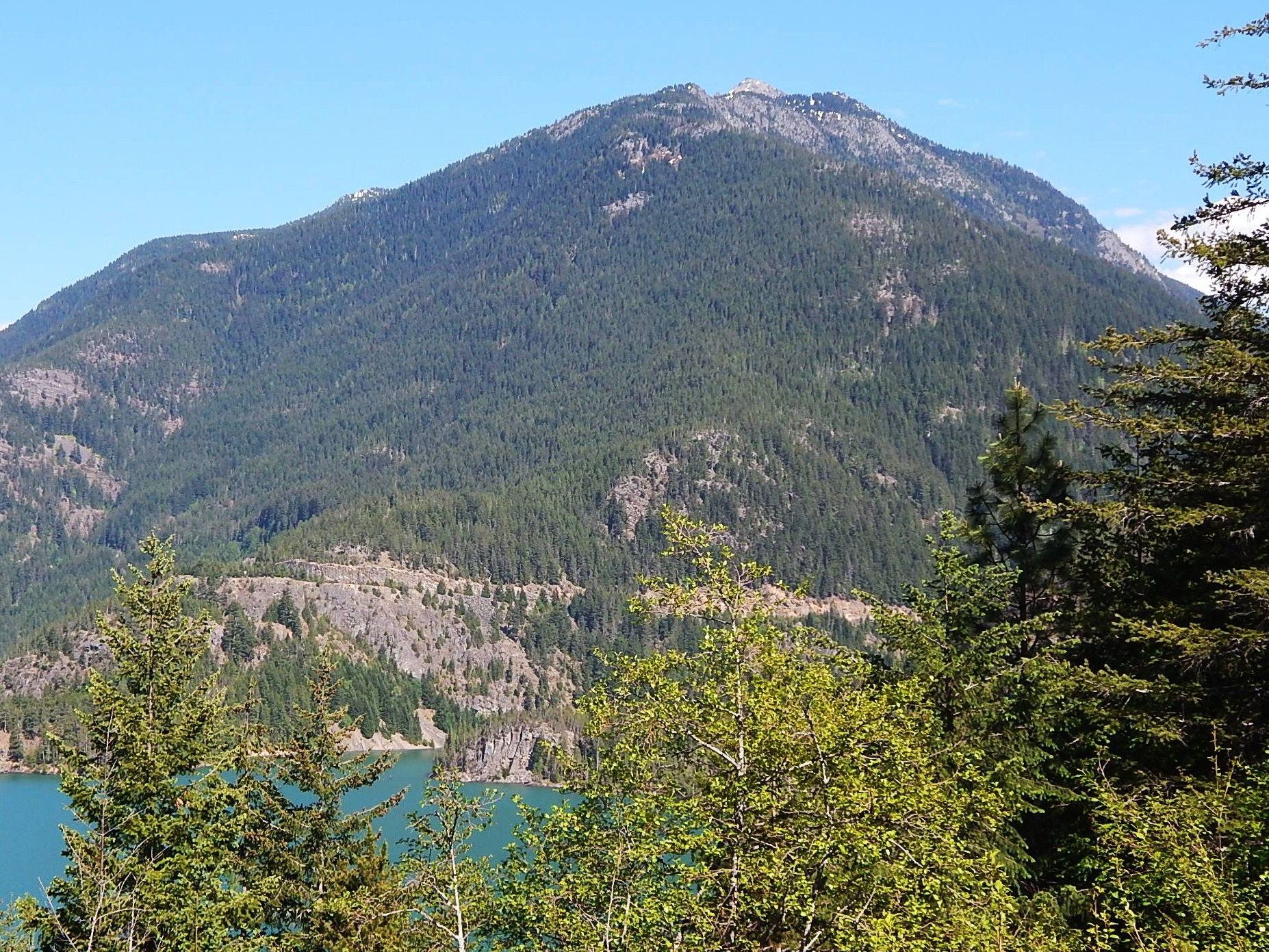

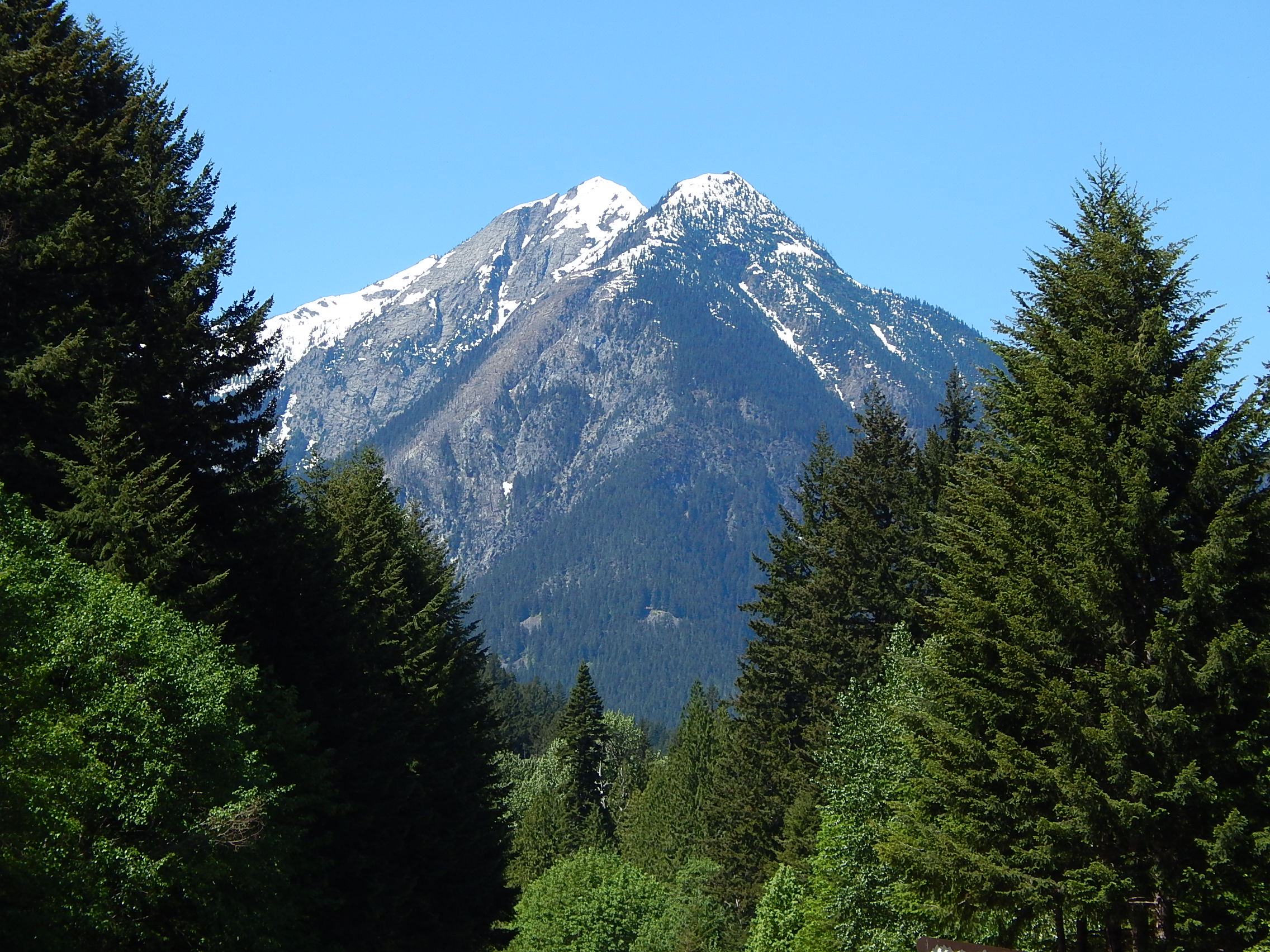

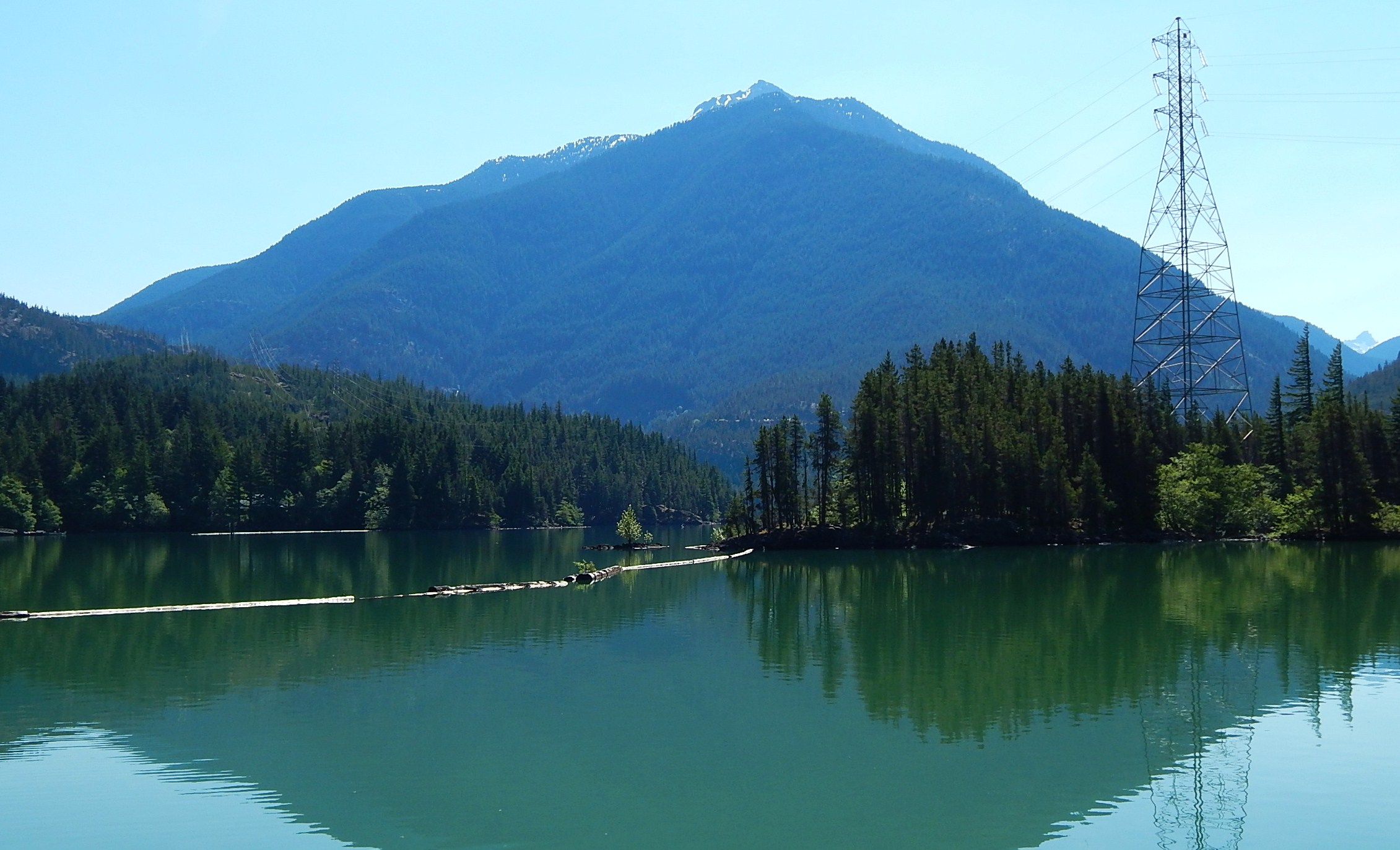

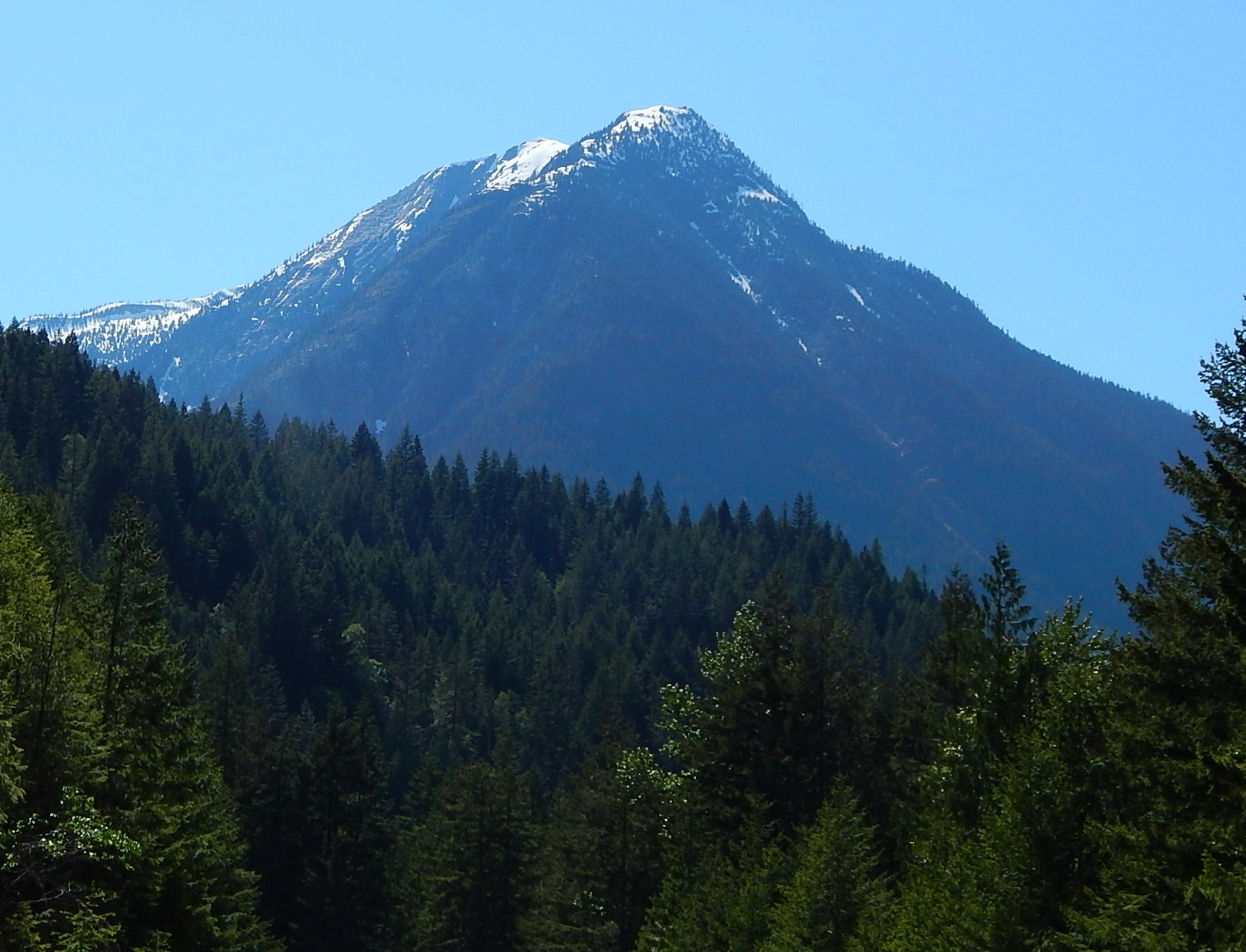

== See also ==
- Geography of the North Cascades
- Geology of the Pacific Northwest
- List of mountain peaks of Washington (state)
