= Thunder Creek (Washington) =

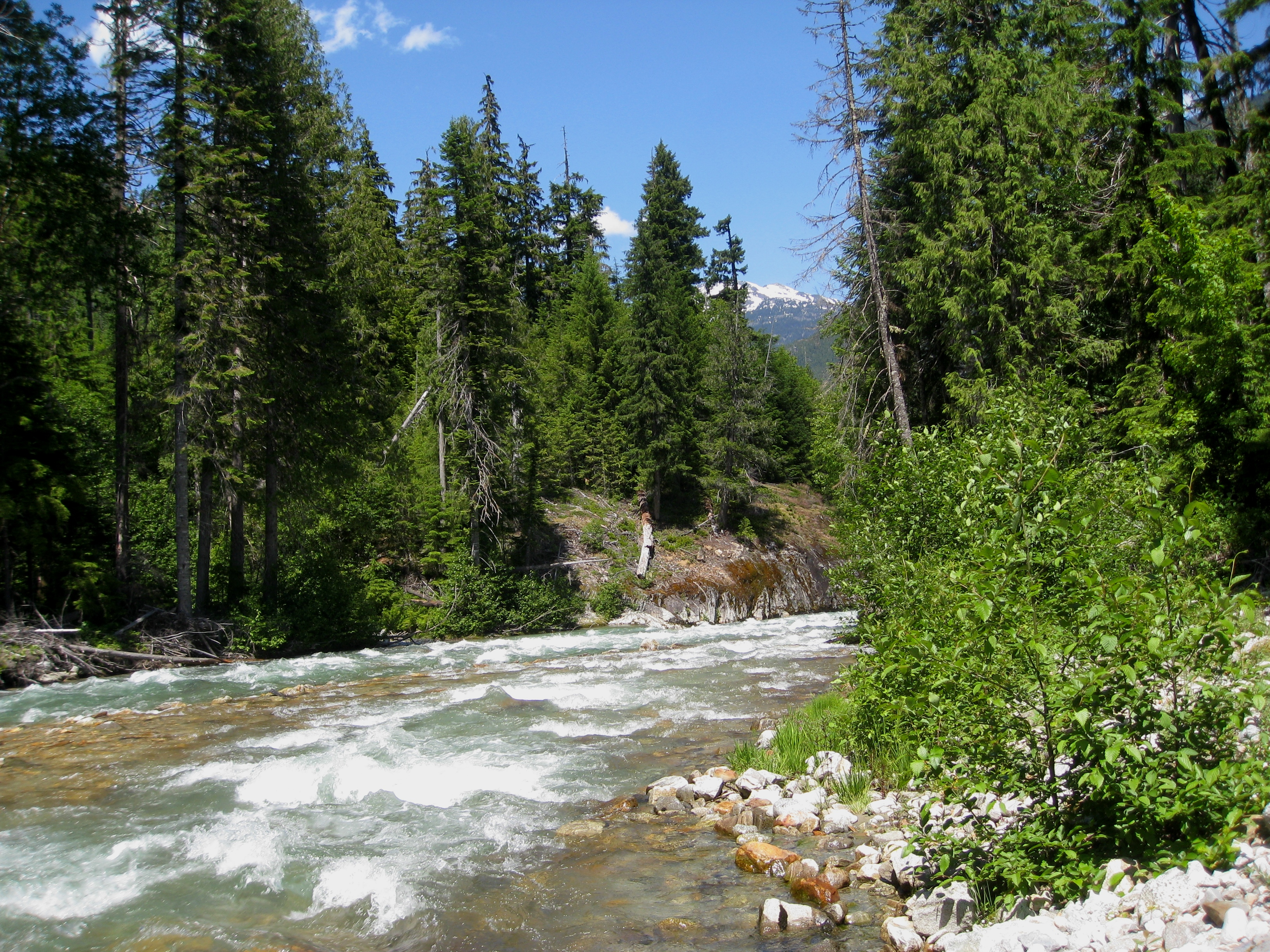
- Thunder Creek

- Location of mouth

Location
- Country: United States
- State: Washington (state)

Physical characteristics
- Source
  - location: Near Park Creek Pass
  - coordinates: 48.5913889°N 122.1644444°W
  - elevation: 5,590 ft (1,700 m)
- Mouth
  - location: Diablo Lake
  - coordinates: 48.6003879°N 122.2346024°W
  - elevation: 1,200 ft (370 m)
- Length: 15 mi (24 km)

Basin features
- Tributaries
  - left: McAllister Creek, Skagit Creek
  - right: Fisher Creek

Thunder Creek is a stream located entirely within North Cascades National Park and the Ross Lake National Recreation Area in the US state of Washington. Thunder Creek runs in a northerly direction most of its route starting from just north of Park Creek Pass in the south district of North Cascades National Park and ending at Diablo Lake in Ross Lake National Recreation Area. Prior to the construction of the Diablo Dam, Thunder Creek emptied into the Skagit River. A popular hiking trail parallels Thunder Creek its entire length. Thunder Creek is well known for having a turquoise appearance from the suspended silt and rock flour caused by runoff from dozens of glaciers, including the largest glacier in the park, Boston Glacier, which feeds Skagit Creek, a tributary stream.
